= Baguio =

Highly-urbanized city in Cordillera Administrative Region, Philippines

- Highly urbanized city
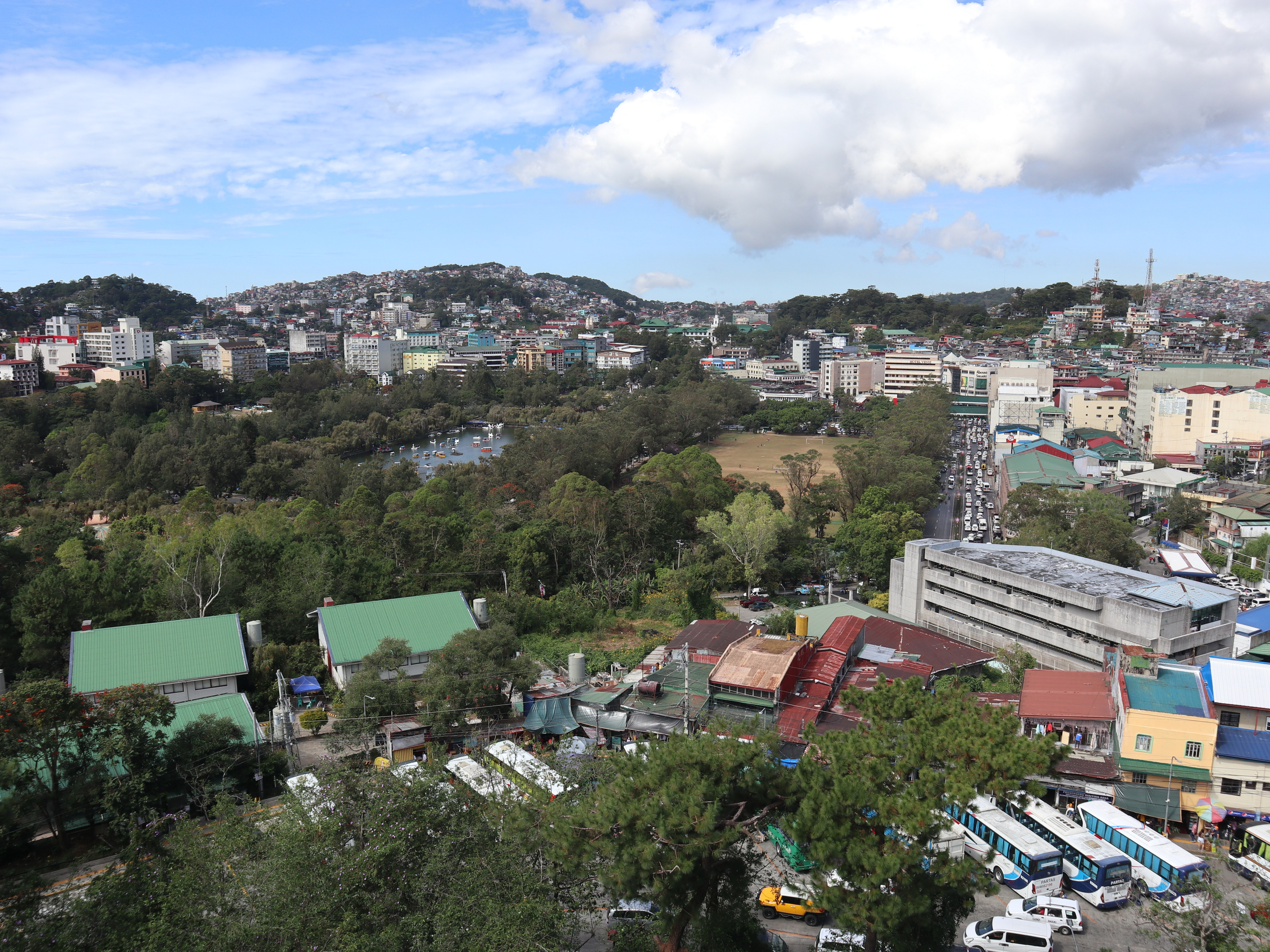
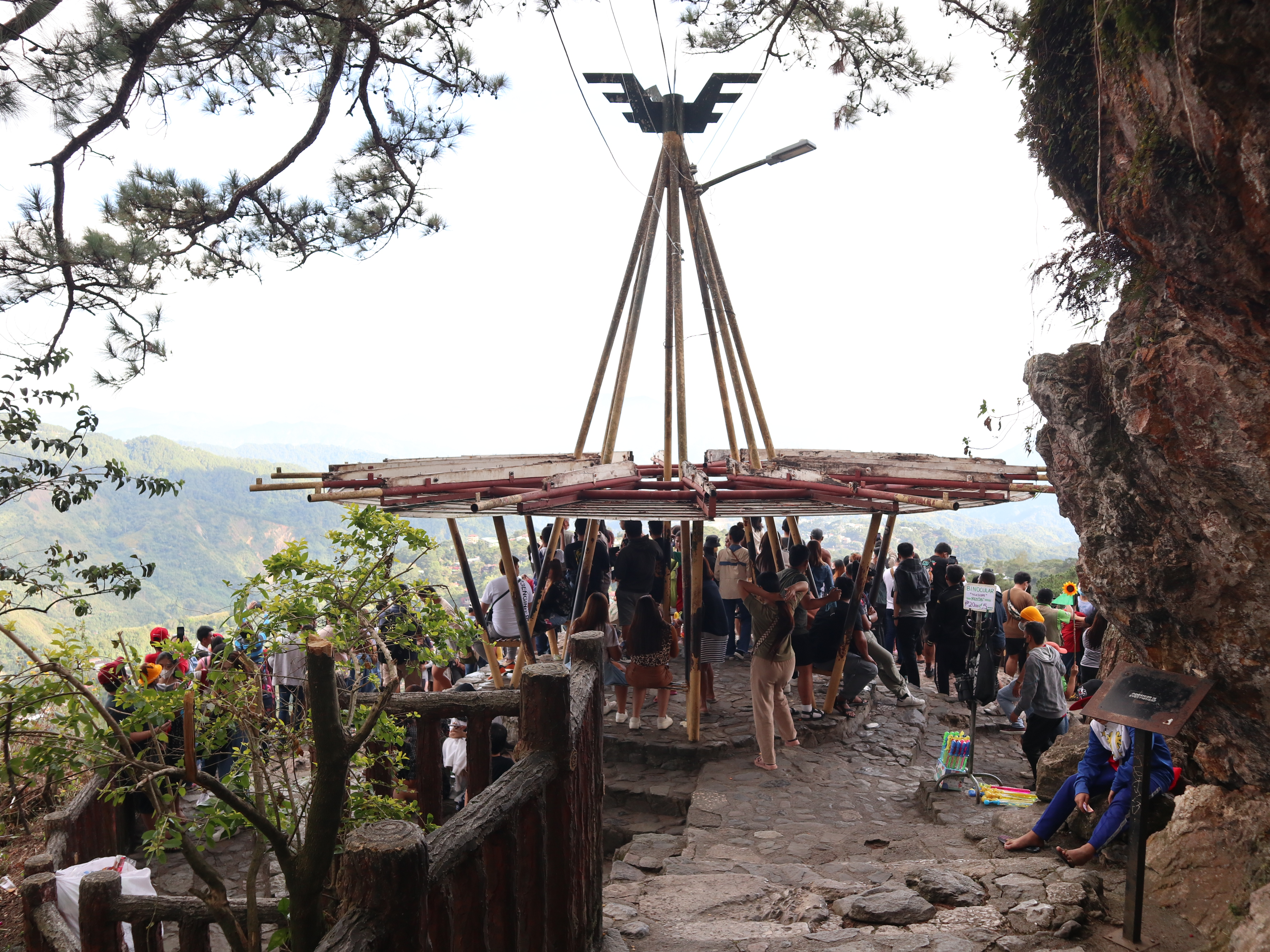
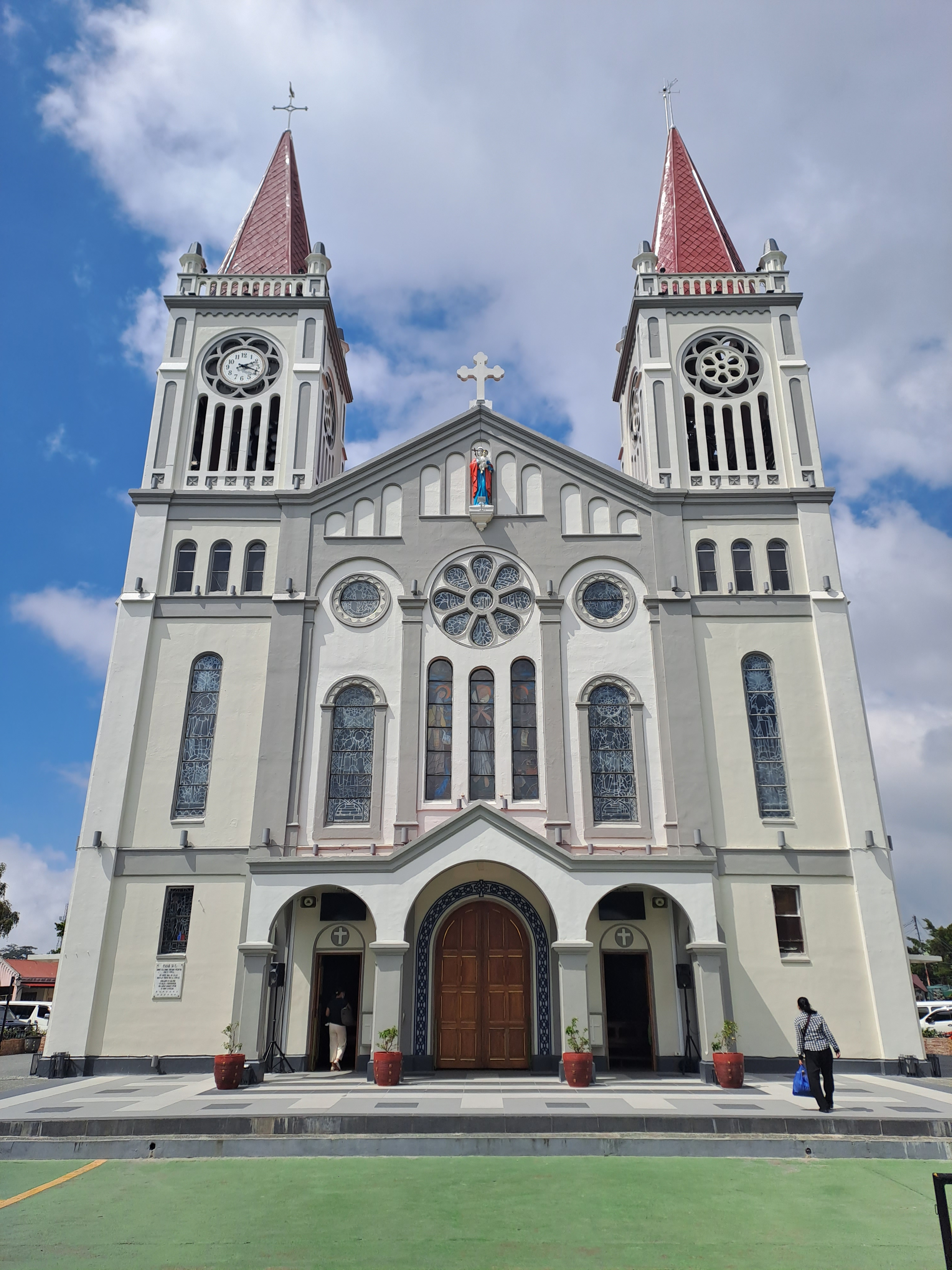
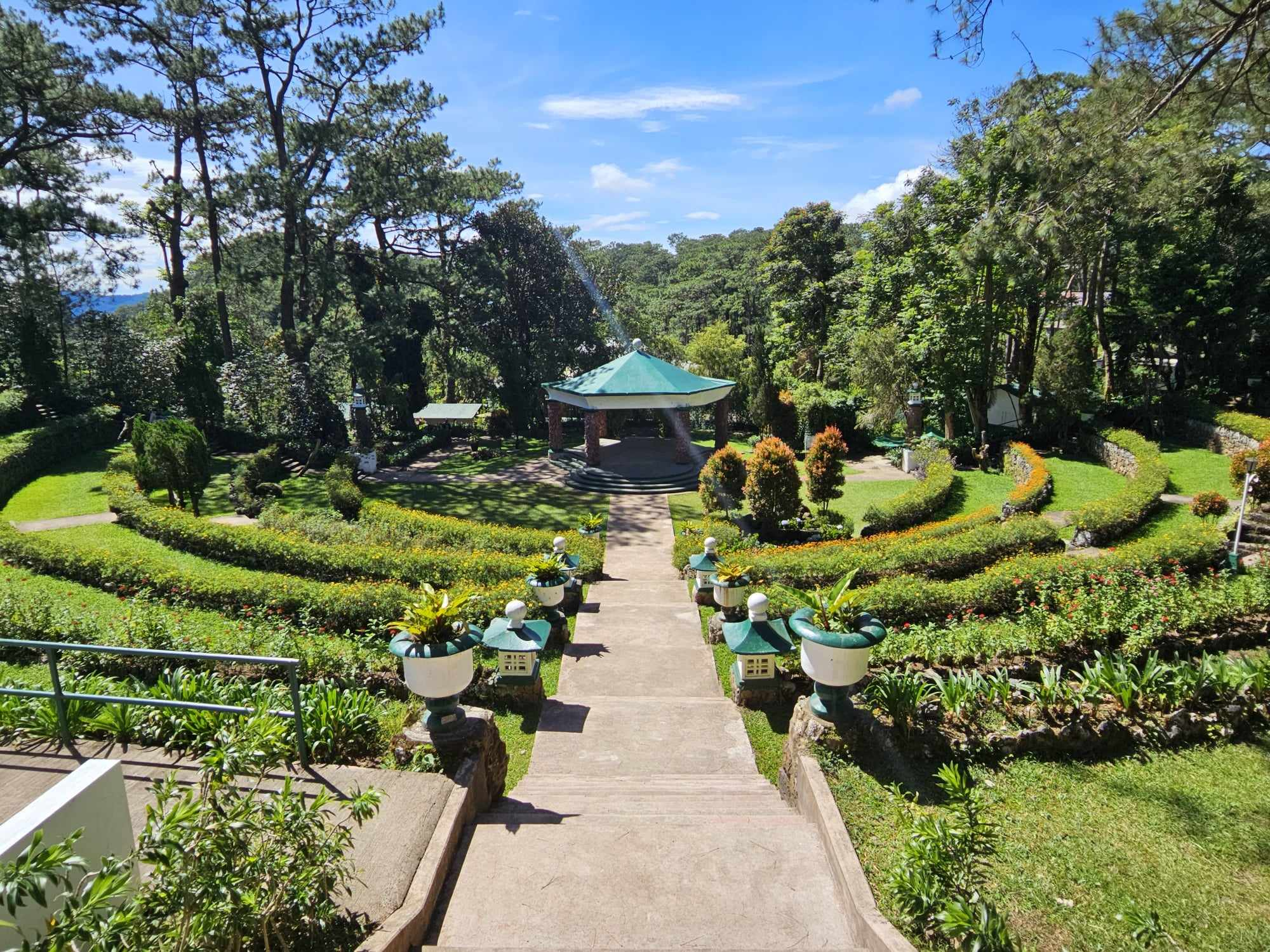
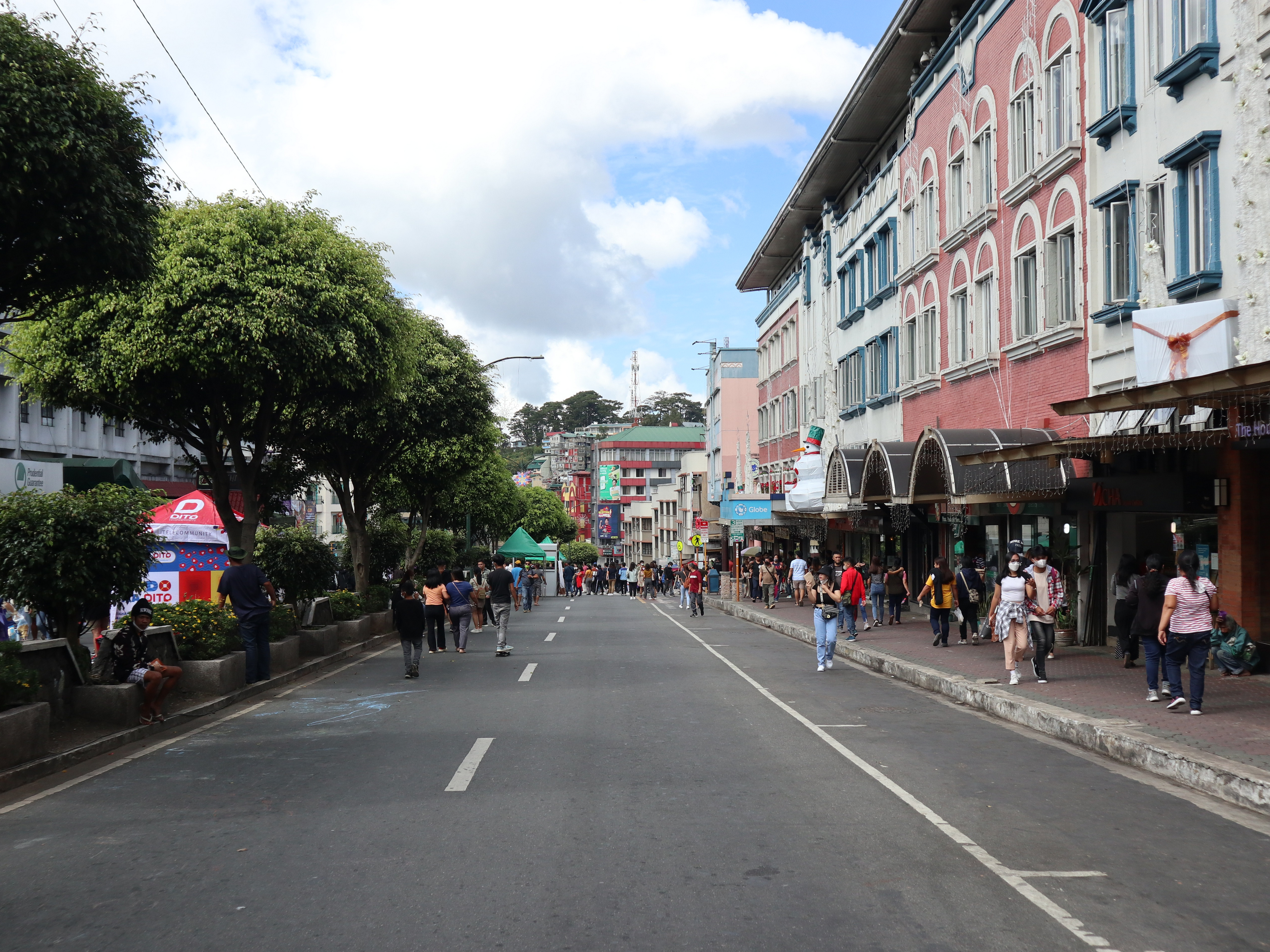
- Skyline with overlooking Burnham Park Mines View Park Baguio Cathedral Camp John Hay Park Session Road

- Seal Wordmark
- Nicknames: Summer Capital of the Philippines; City of Pines
- Anthem: Baguio Hymn
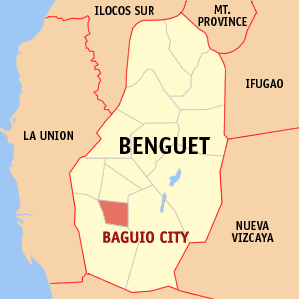
- Map of Cordillera Administrative Region with Baguio highlighted
- Interactive map of Baguio
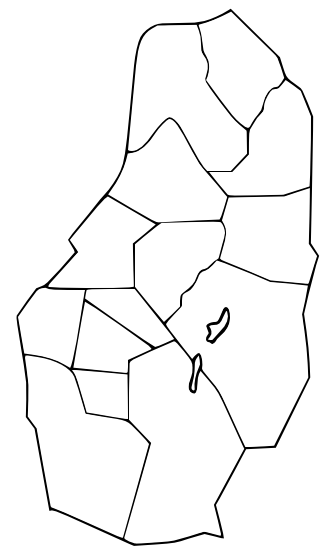
- Location within the Philippines Baguio (Luzon) Baguio (Benguet)
- Coordinates: 16°24′43″N 120°35′36″E
- Country: Philippines
- Region: Cordillera Administrative Region
- Province: Benguet (geographically only)
- District: Lone district
- Founded: 1900
- Incorporated: September 1, 1909 (city)
- Highly urbanized city: December 22, 1979
- Barangays: 129 (see Barangays)

Government
  - Type: Sangguniang Panlungsod
  - Mayor: Benjamin Magalong (NPC)
  - Vice Mayor: Faustino A. Olowan (PFP)
  - Representative: Mauricio G. Domogan (Lakas)
  - City Council: Members: Edison R. Bilog; Joel A. Alangsab; Jose M. Molintas; Leandro B. Yangot Jr.; Vladimir D. Cayabas; Peter C. Fianza; Van Oliver M. Dicang; Fred L. Bagbagen; Paolo Raynor E. Salvosa; Betty Lourdes F. Tabanda; Yuri K. Weygan; Elmer O. Datuin
  - Electorate: 166,416 voters (2025)

Area
  - Highly urbanized city: 57.51 km^{2} (22.20 sq mi)
  - Metro (BLISTT): 1,094.79 km^{2} (422.70 sq mi)
- Elevation: 1,465 m (4,806 ft)
- Highest elevation: 1,667 m (5,469 ft)
- Lowest elevation: 910 m (2,990 ft)

Population (2024 census)
  - Highly urbanized city: 368,426
  - Density: 6,406/km^{2} (16,590/sq mi)
  - Metro (BLISTT): 644,589
  - Metro density: 3,100/km^{2} (8,000/sq mi)
  - Households: 100,220

Economy
  - Gross domestic product: ₱139,174 million (2021) $2,762 million (2021)
  - Income class: 1st city income class
  - Poverty incidence: 0.8% (2023)
  - Revenue: ₱ 2,791 million (2024)
  - Assets: ₱ 12,554 million (2024)
  - Expenditure: ₱ 2,017 million (2024)
  - Liabilities: ₱ 3,177 million (2024)

Service provider
  - Electricity: Benguet Electric Cooperative (BENECO)
  - Water: Baguio Water District (BWD)
- Time zone: UTC+8 (PST)
- ZIP code: 2600
- PSGC: 1430300000
- IDD : area code: +63 (0)74
- Native languages: Kankanaey; Ibaloi; Ilocano; Tagalog
- Website: www.baguio.gov.ph

Baguio (UK: /ˈbæɡioʊ/ BAG-ee-oh, US: /ˈbɑːɡioʊ, ˌbɑːɡiˈoʊ/ BAH-ghee-oh, -OH, Tagalog: [ˈbaɡjo]), officially the City of Baguio (Ibaloi: Siudad ne Bagiw; Ilocano: Siudad ti Baguio; Tagalog: Lungsod ng Baguio), is a highly urbanized city and the regional center of the Cordillera Administrative Region, Philippines. According to the 2024 census, it has a population of 368,426 people.

It is known as the "Summer Capital of the Philippines", owing to the city's cool climate relative to the lowlands. With an approximate elevation of 1,500 meters (4,900 feet) above mean sea level, Baguio belongs to the Luzon tropical pine forests ecoregion; the climate is conducive for the growth of mossy plants, orchids and pine trees, to which it attributes its other moniker as the "City of Pines".

Baguio was established as a hill station by the United States in 1900 at the site of an Ibaloi village known as Kafagway. It was the United States' only hill station in Asia.

Baguio is classified as a highly urbanized city (HUC). It is the largest city in Benguet, serving as the provincial capital from 1901 to 1916, but has since been administered independently from the province following its conversion into a chartered city. Baguio is geographically located within the province of Benguet by the Philippine Statistics Authority for geographical and statistical purposes only. The city is the center of business, commerce, and education in northern Luzon, as well as the most populous city and seat of government of the Cordillera Administrative Region.

As of 2025, the City of Baguio has an estimated population of approximately 407,000 residents. This figure reflects a steady annual growth rate of around 1.75% from the previous year. The population has been gradually increasing over the past decade, with notable growth from 366,358 in 2020 to 392,000 in 2023. The city is also part of the larger Baguio Metropolitan Area, which includes surrounding municipalities and has a combined population of about 451,844 as of 2024. Baguio joined the UNESCO Global Network of Learning Cities in 2025.

== Etymology ==
Baguio was called Kafagway by indigenous peoples. The name Baguio originated in the American period and is derived from the Ibaloi word bagiw (moss), which was then Hispanicized as Baguio. A demonym for natives of the city, Ibagiw, is also derived from it. It is also the name for the city's annual arts festival.

== History ==
=== Ibaloi town of Kafagway ===
Baguio used to be a vast mountain zone with lush highland forests, teeming with various wildlife such as the indigenous deer, cloud rats, Philippine eagles, Philippine warty pigs, and numerous species of flora. The area was a hunting ground of the indigenous peoples, notably the Ibalois and other Igorot ethnic groups. When the Spanish arrived in the Philippines, the area was never fully subjugated by Spain due to the intensive defense tactics of the indigenous Igorots of the Cordilleras.

Igorot oral history states the Benguet upper class, baknang, was founded between 1565 and the early 1600s, by the marriage of a gold trader, Amkidit, and a Kankanaey maiden gold panning in Acupan. Their son, Baruy, discovered a gold deposit in the area, which he developed with hired workers and slaves.

In 1755, the Augustinian Fray Pedro de Vivar established a mission in Tonglo (Tongdo) outside Baguio. Before he was driven out the following year, this rancheria included 220 people, including several baknang families. The Spanish tried to regain the mission in 1759, but were ambushed. This prompted Governor General Pedro Manuel de Arandía Santisteban to send Don Manuel Arza de Urrutia on a punitive expedition, which resulted in the mission being burned to the ground.

=== Spanish rule ===
During Spanish rule in 1846, the Spaniards established a command post or a comandancia in the nearby town of La Trinidad, and organized Benguet into 31 rancherías, one of which was Kafagway, a wide grassy area where the present Burnham Park is situated. Kafagway was then a minor rancheria consisting of only about 20 houses; most of the lands in Kafagway were owned by a prominent Ibaloi, Mateo Cariño, who served as its chieftain. The Spanish presidencia, which was located at Bag-iw in the vicinity of Guisad Valley was later moved to Cariño's house where the current city hall stands. Bag-iw was the Ibaloi toponym of the town, an Ibaloi term for "moss" which was historically abundant in the area. This name was spelled by the Spaniards as Baguio.

=== First Philippine Republic ===
During the Philippine Revolution in July 1899, Filipino revolutionary forces under Pedro Paterno liberated La Trinidad from the Spaniards and took over the government, proclaiming Benguet as a province of the new Philippine Republic. Baguio was converted into a "town", with Mateo Cariño being the presidente (mayor).

=== American rule ===
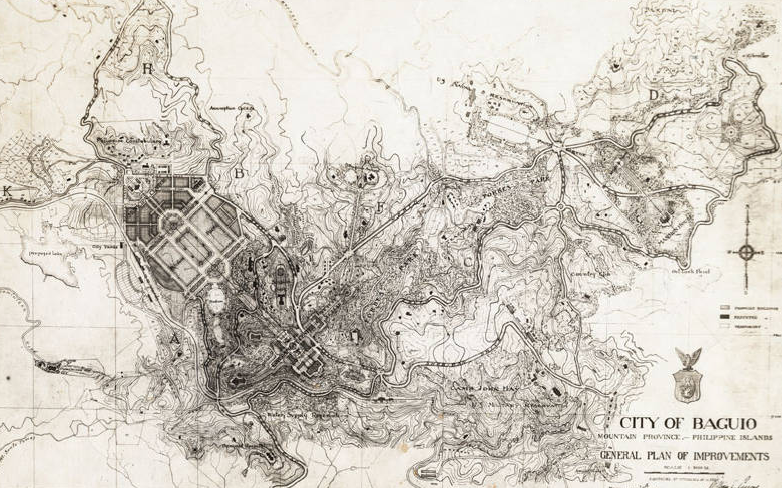
Baguio city plan map made by Daniel Burnham, circa 1905

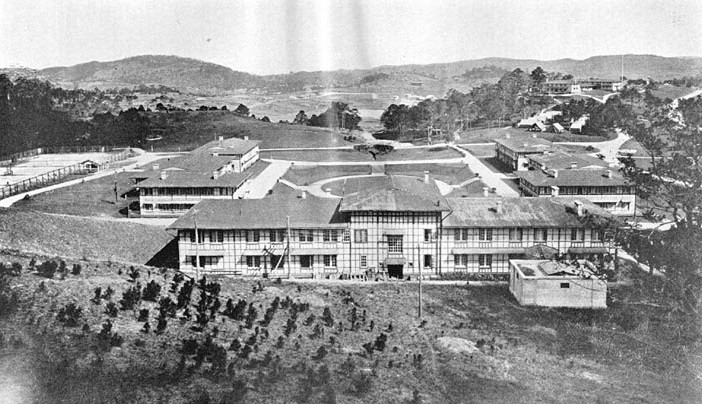
Summer offices of the Philippine Insular Government in Baguio in 1909

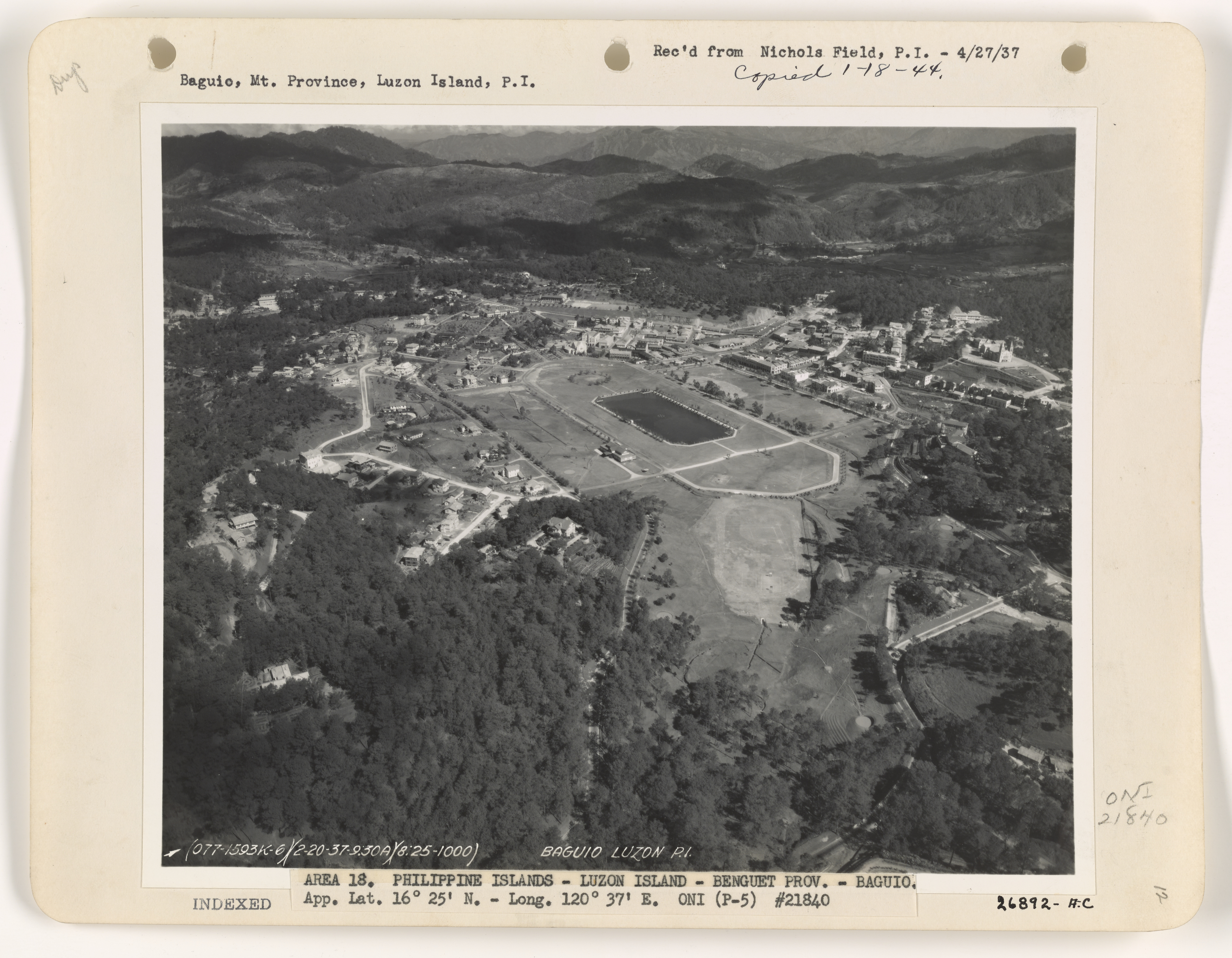
Aerial view of Baguio, 1937

When the United States occupied the Philippines after the Spanish–American War, Baguio was selected to become the summer capital of the then Philippine Islands. American zoologist Dean Conant Worcester headed an expedition in 1900 after convincing U.S. Secretary of State Elihu Root to order an expedition to a cool place in the northern mountains of the Philippines. Governor-General William Taft, on his first visit in 1901, noted the "air as bracing as Adirondacks or Murray Bay..." On November 11, 1901, the American colonial government expropriated lands in Baguio owned by the Ibaloi people, who were forced to sell their lands.

In 1903, Filipinos, Japanese and Chinese workers were hired to build Kennon Road, the first road directly connecting Baguio with the lowlands of La Union and Pangasinan. Before this, the only road to Benguet was Naguilian Road, and it was largely a horse trail at higher elevations. Camp John Hay was established in October 1903, after President Theodore Roosevelt signed an executive order setting aside land in Benguet for a military reservation for the United States Army to rest and recuperate from the lowland heat. It was named after Roosevelt's Secretary of State, John Milton Hay.

The Mansion, built in 1908, served as the official residence of the American Governor-General during the summer to escape Manila's heat. The Mansion was designed by architect William E. Parsons based on preliminary plans by architect Daniel Burnham.

Burnham, one of the earliest successful modern city planners, designed the mountain retreat following the tenets of the City Beautiful movement. In 1904, the rest of the city was planned out by Burnham. On September 1, 1909, Baguio was declared as a chartered city and nicknamed the "Summer Capital of the Philippines".

The succeeding period saw further developments of and in Baguio with the construction of Wright Park in honor of Governor-General Luke Edward Wright, Burnham Park in honor of Burnham, Governor Pack Road, and Session Road.

=== World War II ===
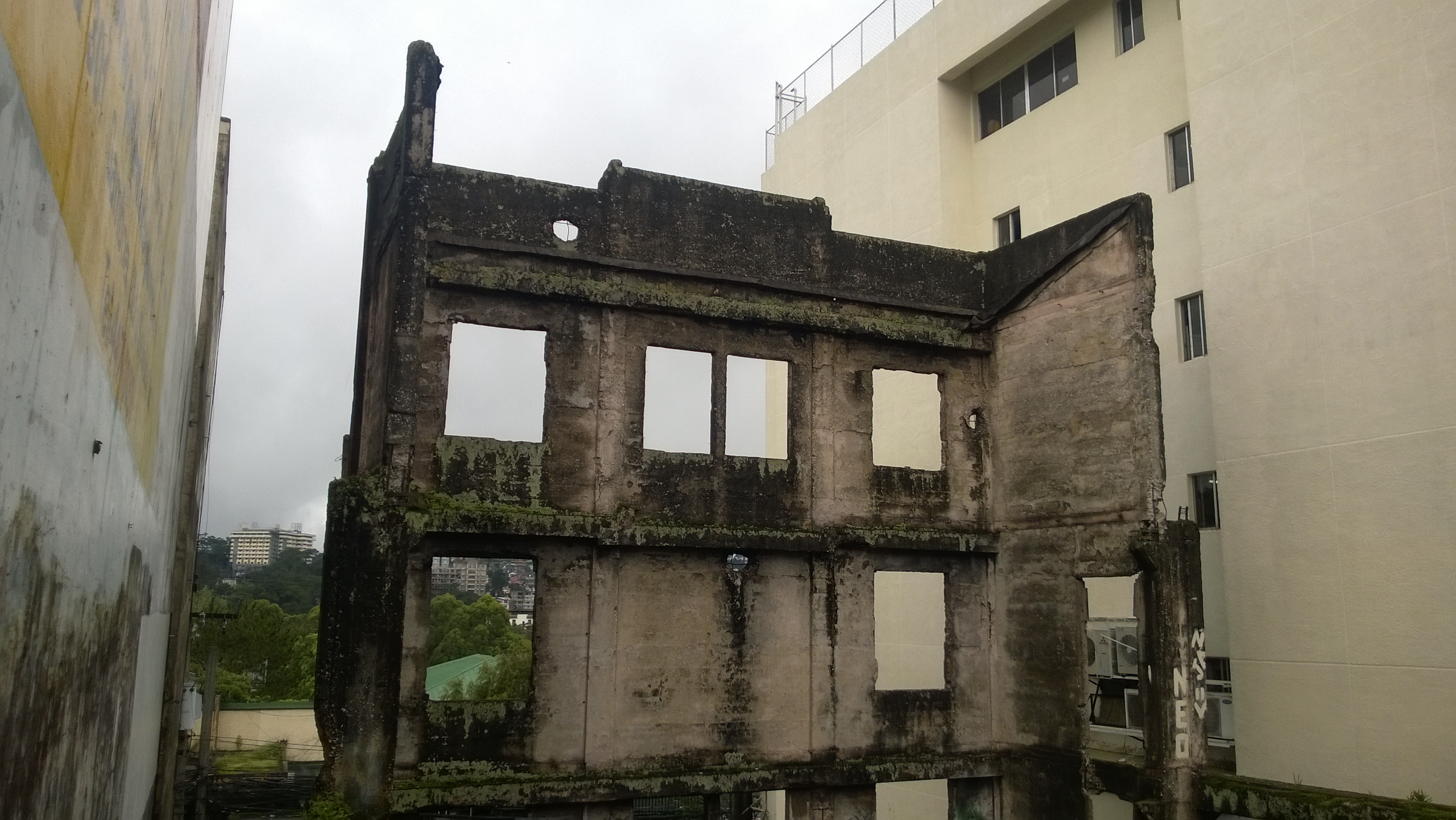
The ruins of an office building along Session Road, destroyed by artillery fire during the Battle of Baguio. The ruins were demolished for new development in 2021.

Prior to World War II, Baguio was the summer capital of the Commonwealth of the Philippines, and the home of the Philippine Military Academy. As such, it was very important in military and political terms. Philippine President Manuel Quezon was even in Baguio when the war began.

On December 8, 1941, 17 Japanese bombers attacked Camp John Hay,as part of the first Japanese air raid on Luzon. Baguio was declared an open city in December 27.

Following the Japanese invasion of the Philippines in 1941, the Imperial Japanese Army used Camp John Hay, an American installation in Baguio, as a military base. The nearby Philippine Constabulary base, Camp Holmes, was used as an internment camp for about 500 civilian enemy aliens, mostly Americans, between April 1942 and December 1944.

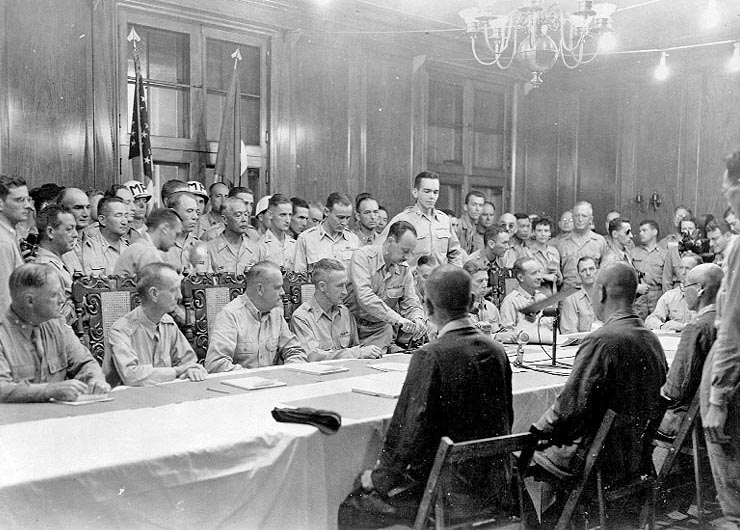
General Yamashita (center, on the near side of the table) at the surrender ceremony at Camp John Hay on September 3, 1945.

President José P. Laurel of the Second Philippine Republic, a puppet state established in 1943, departed the city on March 22 and reached Taiwan eight days later, on March 30. The remainder of the Second Republic government, along with Japanese civilians, were ordered to evacuate Baguio on March 30. General Tomoyuki Yamashita and his staff then relocated to Bambang, Nueva Vizcaya.

By late March 1945, Baguio was within range of the American and Filipino military artillery. Between March 4 and 10, United States Fifth Air Force planes dropped 933 tons of bombs and 1,185 gallons of napalm on Baguio, reducing much of the city to rubble. A major offensive to capture Baguio did not occur until April 1945, when the USAFIP-NL's 1st Battalion of the 66th Infantry, attached with the United States Army's 37th Infantry Division, the USAFIP-NL's 2nd Battalion of 66th Infantry, attached with the US 33rd Infantry Division, and the USAFIP-NL's 3rd Battalion of the 66th Infantry, converged on Baguio. By April 27, 1945, the city was liberated and the joint force proceeded to liberate the La Trinidad valley.

In September 1945, the Japanese forces in the Philippines, headed by General Yamashita and Vice Admiral Okochi, formally surrendered at Camp John Hay's American Residence in the presence of lieutenant generals Arthur Percival and Jonathan Wainwright.

=== Post-World War II recovery ===
With the end of World War II, Baguio recovered quickly, earning a significant reputation as a tourism venue and earning significantly from tourism even though it ceased to be the official "Summer Capital of the Philippines" in 1976.

=== During the Marcos dictatorship ===
The beginning months of the 1970s marked a period of turmoil and change in the Philippines, as well as in Baguio. During his bid to be the first Philippine president to be re-elected for a second term, Ferdinand Marcos launched an unprecedented number of public works projects. This caused the Philippine economy took a sudden downwards turn known as the 1969 Philippine balance of payments crisis, which in turn led to a period of economic difficulty and social unrest. With only a year left in his last constitutionally allowed term as president Ferdinand Marcos placed the Philippines under Martial Law in September 1972 and thus retained the position for fourteen more years. This period in Philippine history is remembered for the Marcos administration's record of human rights abuses, particularly targeting political opponents, student activists, journalists, religious workers, farmers, and others who fought against the Marcos dictatorship.

During this time, Baguio City jail was partially adapted to become a detention center for "political detainees" who were jailed because the administration saw them as threats, and who were often held without being formally charged, which is why they were classified as "detainees", not "prisoners." Among the prominent prisoners held at the Baguio City jail were 1967 Miss Philippines–World Maita Gomez who had spoken against the government, and Bulletin Today journalist Isidoro Chammag who had angered Marcos' soldiers by covering the 1983 Beew Massacre in Tubo, Abra. Camp Henry T. Allen, the original site of the Philippine Military Academy near the Baguio City Hall, was also designated as a detention center during this time. Many of these political detainees could not afford representation, so the Baguio Chapter of the Free Legal Assistance Group, headed by Human Rights Lawyer Arthur Galace, was kept busy defending them throughout the Martial law era.

=== During the 1986 People Power Revolution ===
In the wake of the Snap Presidential elections of 1986, antidictatorship organizers were based largely in the Azotea Building midway up Session Road, and in Cafe Amapola further up Session, at its intersection with Governor Pack Road. Because the United States' Armed Forces Radio and Television Network station at Camp John Hay was transmitting news from Manila, they learned early on that the People Power Revolution had begun in Manila. Deciding that their locations were too unsafe, they encamped in the courtyard of the Baguio Cathedral, which was located on higher ground. They were later joined by Lt. Benjamin Magalong, of the Philippine Constabulary detachment in Buguias, Benguet, who had defected from the government, gone to the nearby Central Police Station in Baguio, and disarmed its personnel to prevent any untoward incidents while Baguio residents continued to gather at the cathedral to protest the abuses of the Marcos administration. The Baguio Cathedral, and Session Road adjacent to it, thus became the center of the People Power revolution in Baguio - paralleling similar protests in Cebu, Davao, Bacolod, Manila, and other major Philippine cities, eventually leading to the ouster of President Ferdinand Marcos on February 25, 1986.

=== Creation of the Cordillera Administrative Region ===
On July 15, 1987, President Corazon Aquino issued Executive Order 220 which created the Cordillera Administrative Region, and made the highly urbanized city of Baguio its seat of government. Various attempts at legally turning the Cordillera Administrative Region into an autonomous region have been pursued, but failed to gather enough public support in two separate autonomy plebiscites.

=== 1990 Luzon Earthquake and aftermath ===
The 1990 Luzon earthquake (M_{s} = 7.7) destroyed some parts of Baguio and the surrounding province of Benguet on the afternoon of July 16, 1990. A significant number of buildings and infrastructure were damaged, including the Hyatt Terraces Plaza, Nevada Hotel, Baguio Park Hotel, FRB Hotel and Baguio Hilltop Hotel; major highways were temporarily blocked due to landslides and pavement breakup; and a number of houses were leveled or severely shaken with numerous casualties. Some of the fallen buildings were built on or near fault lines; local architects later admitted structural building codes should have been followed more religiously, particularly regarding concrete and rebar standards, and "soft stories." Baguio has been rebuilt with aid from the national government and international donors such as Japan, Singapore and the United States.

== Geography ==
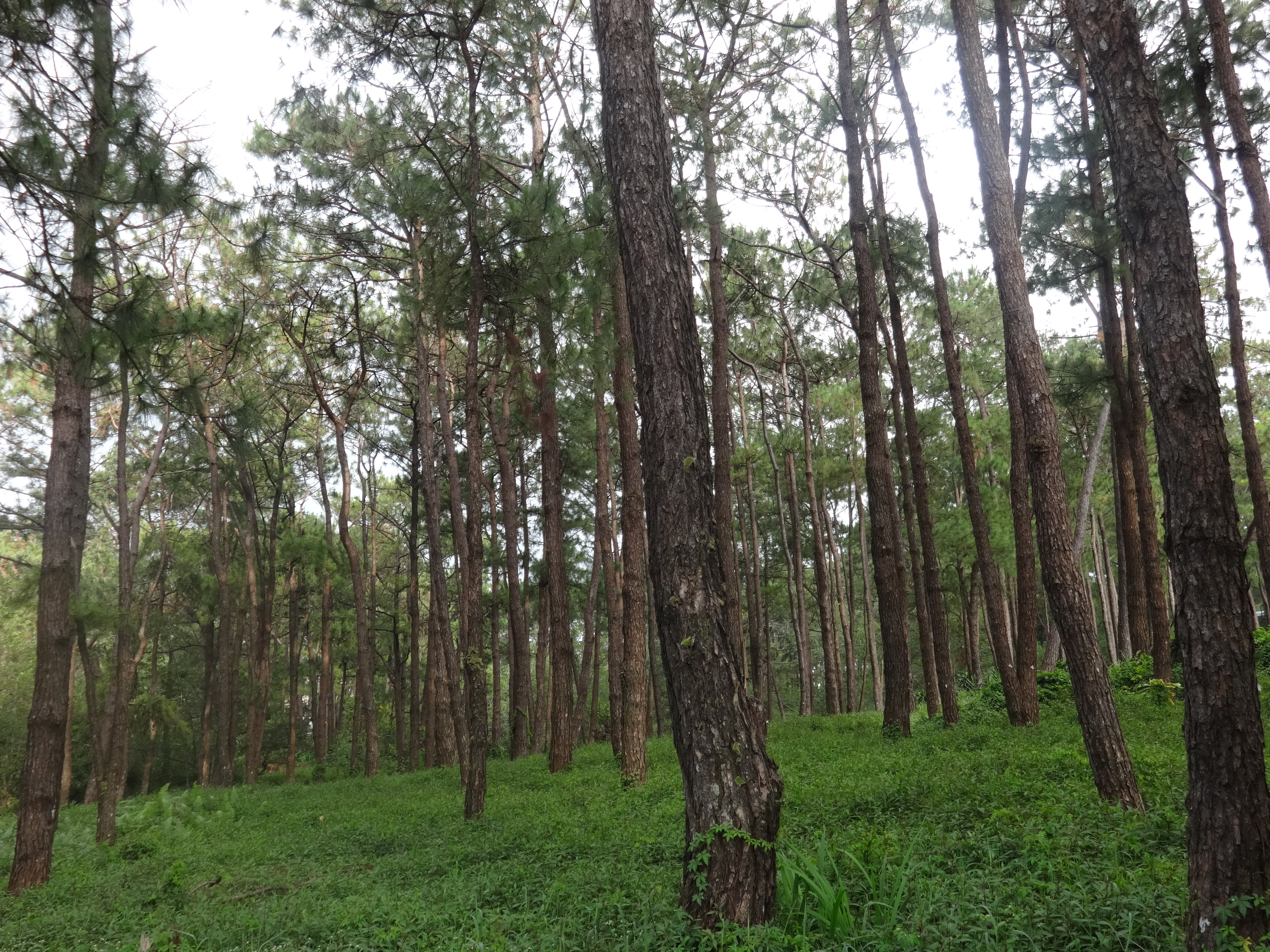
Pine trees near UP Baguio

Baguio is a highland city nestled within the Cordillera Central mountain range in northern Luzon. While the downtown core ranges from 1,400 to 1,500 meters above sea level, elevations within Baguio's administrative boundaries extend from about 900 meters (along the Bued River) to almost 1,700 meters (5,600 ft) (around the Busol watershed). Baguio City Hall sits at 1,465 meters (4,806 ft) above sea level. Mountain peaks on the outskirts of the city reach over 2,200 m (7,200 ft) above sea level, the highest being Mount Santo Tomas in Tuba, which is part of Metro Baguio.

Enclosed by the province of Benguet, the city's jurisdiction covers a small area of 57.5 square kilometers (22.2 sq mi). Most of the developed part of the city is built on the uneven, hilly terrain of the northern section. When Daniel Burnham drew plans for the city, he made the City Hall a reference point where the city limits extend 8.2 kilometers (5.1 mi) from east to west and 7.2 km (4.5 mi) from north to south.

=== Barangays ===
Baguio is composed of 129 barangays. Each barangay consists of puroks and some have sitios.

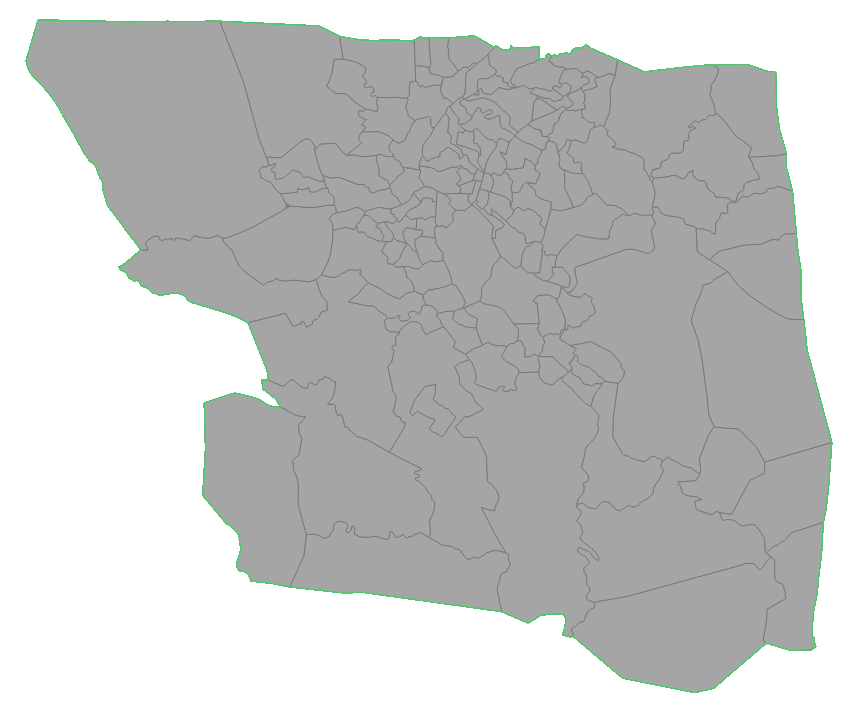
Barangays of Baguio

- A. Bonifacio-Caguioa-Rimando (ABCR)
- Abanao-Zandueta-Kayong-Chugum-Otek (AZKCO)
- Alfonso Tabora
- Ambiong
- Andres Bonifacio (Lower Bokawkan)
- Apugan-Loakan
- Asin Road
- Atok Trail
- Aurora Hill Proper (Malvar-Sgt. Floresca)
- Aurora Hill, North Central
- Aurora Hill, South Central
- Bagong Lipunan (Market Area)
- Bakakeng Central
- Bakakeng North
- Bal-Marcoville (Marcoville)
- Balsigan
- Bayan Park East
- Bayan Park Village
- Bayan Park West (Bayan Park, Leonila Hill)
- BGH Compound
- Brookside
- Brookspoint
- Cabinet Hill-Teacher's Camp
- Camdas Subdivision
- Camp 7
- Camp 8
- Camp Allen
- Campo Filipino
- City Camp Central
- City Camp Proper
- Country Club Village
- Cresencia Village
- Dagsian, Lower
- Dagsian, Upper
- Dizon Subdivision
- Dominican Hill-Mirador
- Dontogan
- DPS Compound
- Engineers' Hill
- Fairview Village
- Ferdinand (Happy Homes-Campo Sioco)
- Fort del Pilar
- Gabriela Silang
- General Emilio F. Aguinaldo (Quirino‑Magsaysay, Lower)
- General Luna, Upper
- General Luna, Lower
- Gibraltar
- Greenwater Village
- Guisad Central
- Guisad Sorong
- Happy Hollow
- Happy Homes (Happy Homes-Lucban)
- Harrison-Claudio Carantes
- Hillside
- Holy Ghost Extension
- Holy Ghost Proper
- Honeymoon (Honeymoon-Holy Ghost)
- Imelda R. Marcos (La Salle)
- Imelda Village
- Irisan
- Kabayanihan
- Kagitingan
- Kayang Extension
- Kayang-Hilltop
- Kias
- Legarda-Burnham-Kisad
- Liwanag-Loakan
- Loakan Proper
- Lopez Jaena
- Lourdes Subdivision Extension
- Lourdes Subdivision, Lower
- Lourdes Subdivision, Proper
- Lualhati
- Lucnab
- Magsaysay Private Road
- Magsaysay, Lower
- Magsaysay, Upper
- Malcolm Square-Perfecto (Jose Abad Santos)
- Manuel A. Roxas
- Market Subdivision, Upper
- Middle Quezon Hill Subdivision (Quezon Hill Middle)
- Military Cut-off
- Mines View Park
- Modern Site, East
- Modern Site, West
- MRR-Queen of Peace
- New Lucban
- Outlook Drive
- Pacdal
- Padre Burgos
- Padre Zamora
- Palma-Urbano (Cariño-Palma)
- Phil-Am
- Pinget
- Pinsao Pilot Project
- Pinsao Proper
- Poliwes
- Pucsusan
- Quezon Hill Proper
- Quezon Hill, Upper
- Quirino Hill, East
- Quirino Hill, Lower
- Quirino Hill, Middle
- Quirino Hill, West
- Quirino-Magsaysay, Upper (Upper QM)
- Rizal Monument Area
- Rock Quarry, Lower
- Rock Quarry, Middle
- Rock Quarry, Upper
- Saint Joseph Village
- Salud Mitra
- San Antonio Village
- San Luis Village
- San Roque Village
- San Vicente
- Sanitary Camp, North
- Sanitary Camp, South
- Santa Escolastica
- Santo Rosario
- Santo Tomas Proper
- Santo Tomas School Area
- Scout Barrio
- Session Road Area
- Slaughter House Area (Santo Niño Slaughter)
- SLU-SVP Housing Village
- South Drive
- Teodora Alonzo
- Trancoville
- Victoria Village

==== Proposed merger of barangays ====
A proposed merging of the city's 129 barangays had not been implemented since its inception in 2000. Several local officials stressed that many of the city's barangays did not comply with the minimum requirements in the Local Government Code of the Philippines that a highly urbanized city must have a certified population of least 5,000 inhabitants. According to Mayor Mauricio Domogan, in the past, benefits granted to local governments were based on the number of existing barangays; this led former local officials to create as many barangays as possible in the city in order to acquire additional benefits from the national government. The proposed merger, which will reduce the barangays from 130 to about 40 to 50 by merging adjacent ones, is believed to solve several issues concerning barangay boundary disputes, seemingly biased allocation of funds for larger barangays in relation to barangays with lesser area and population, as well as the inadequate honorarium of barangay officials.

=== Climate ===
Baguio has a subtropical highland climate (Köppen: Cwb; Trewartha: Cwbl) due to the combined effect of its tropical latitude and high elevation.

Climate data for Baguio (1991–2020 normals, extremes 1909–2021)
Month	Jan	Feb	Mar	Apr	May	Jun	Jul	Aug	Sep	Oct	Nov	Dec	Year
Record high °C (°F)	28.4 (83.1)	28.7 (83.7)	30.4 (86.7)	30.0 (86.0)	29.4 (84.9)	28.7 (83.7)	27.9 (82.2)	27.7 (81.9)	28.0 (82.4)	27.7 (81.9)	28.2 (82.8)	28.2 (82.8)	30.4 (86.7)
Mean daily maximum °C (°F)	22.6 (72.7)	23.7 (74.7)	24.8 (76.6)	25.5 (77.9)	24.7 (76.5)	24.3 (75.7)	23.1 (73.6)	22.3 (72.1)	23.0 (73.4)	23.6 (74.5)	23.9 (75.0)	23.5 (74.3)	23.8 (74.8)
Daily mean °C (°F)	17.4 (63.3)	18.5 (65.3)	19.7 (67.5)	20.7 (69.3)	20.6 (69.1)	20.4 (68.7)	19.6 (67.3)	19.3 (66.7)	19.6 (67.3)	19.6 (67.3)	19.5 (67.1)	18.8 (65.8)	19.5 (67.1)
Mean daily minimum °C (°F)	13.0 (55.4)	13.4 (56.1)	14.5 (58.1)	15.9 (60.6)	16.4 (61.5)	16.5 (61.7)	16.2 (61.2)	16.2 (61.2)	16.1 (61.0)	15.6 (60.1)	15.1 (59.2)	14.1 (57.4)	15.2 (59.4)
Record low °C (°F)	6.3 (43.3)	6.7 (44.1)	7.4 (45.3)	10.0 (50.0)	12.0 (53.6)	13.3 (55.9)	12.5 (54.5)	12.8 (55.0)	12.6 (54.7)	11.3 (52.3)	9.2 (48.6)	7.6 (45.7)	6.3 (43.3)
Average rainfall mm (inches)	16.4 (0.65)	23.7 (0.93)	50.5 (1.99)	99.5 (3.92)	340.0 (13.39)	406.1 (15.99)	772.7 (30.42)	963.2 (37.92)	537.3 (21.15)	477.3 (18.79)	96.1 (3.78)	41.6 (1.64)	3,824.4 (150.57)
Average rainy days (≥ 1 mm)	3	3	5	8	18	19	24	25	22	13	7	5	152
Average relative humidity (%)	85	85	84	85	88	90	92	93	92	90	86	85	88
Mean monthly sunshine hours	226.5	228.0	242.6	254.9	224.9	206.3	168.0	145.5	178.9	232.2	223.2	210.9	2,541.8
Percentage possible sunshine	66	71	66	69	57	53	42	37	49	65	66	62	58
Source 1: PAGASA
Source 2: DWD (sunshine 1978-2022)

Owing to its generally high altitude (mostly above 1300 meters), the city is known for its mild climate and unusually low temperatures for the Philippines: typically about 7 to 10 °C (13 to 18 °F) cooler than lowland areas near sea level. Daily temperatures range from 15 to 23 °C (59 to 73 °F), on average, with the lowest temperatures occurring between November and February. The lowest recorded temperature was 6.3 °C (43.3 °F) on January 18, 1961; in contrast, the all-time high of 30.4 °C (86.7 °F) was recorded on March 15, 1988, during the 1988 El Niño season. The temperature seldom exceeds 26 °C (78.8 °F) even during the warmest part of the year.

==== Precipitation ====
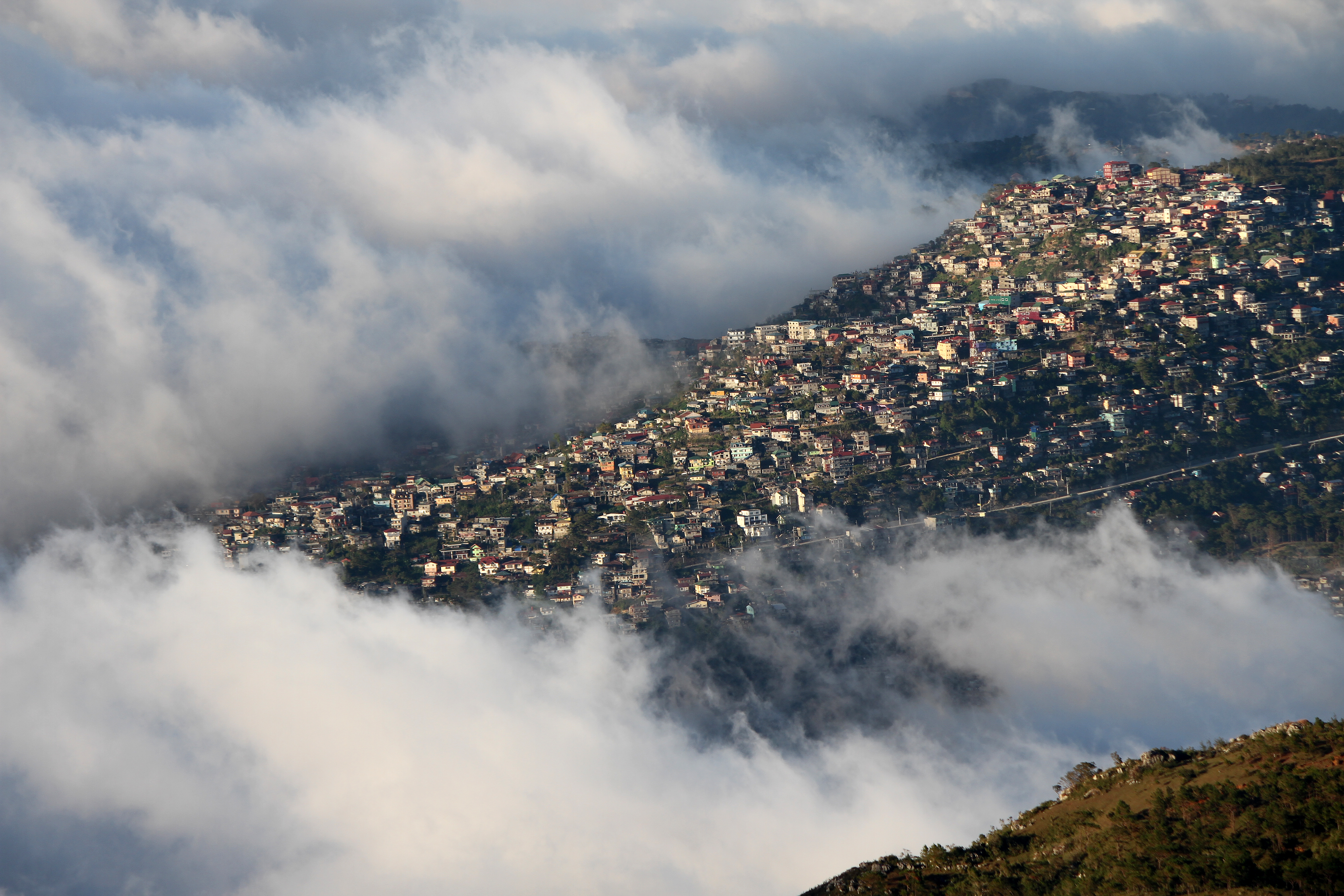
Fog in Baguio as viewed from Mount Cabuyao

Like many other cities with a monsoon-influenced climate, Baguio receives noticeably less precipitation during its dry season. However, the city has an extraordinary amount of precipitation during the rainy season from June to October. The city averages over 3,914 mm (154 in) of rainfall annually, the highest in the country.

== Environment ==
=== Pollution ===
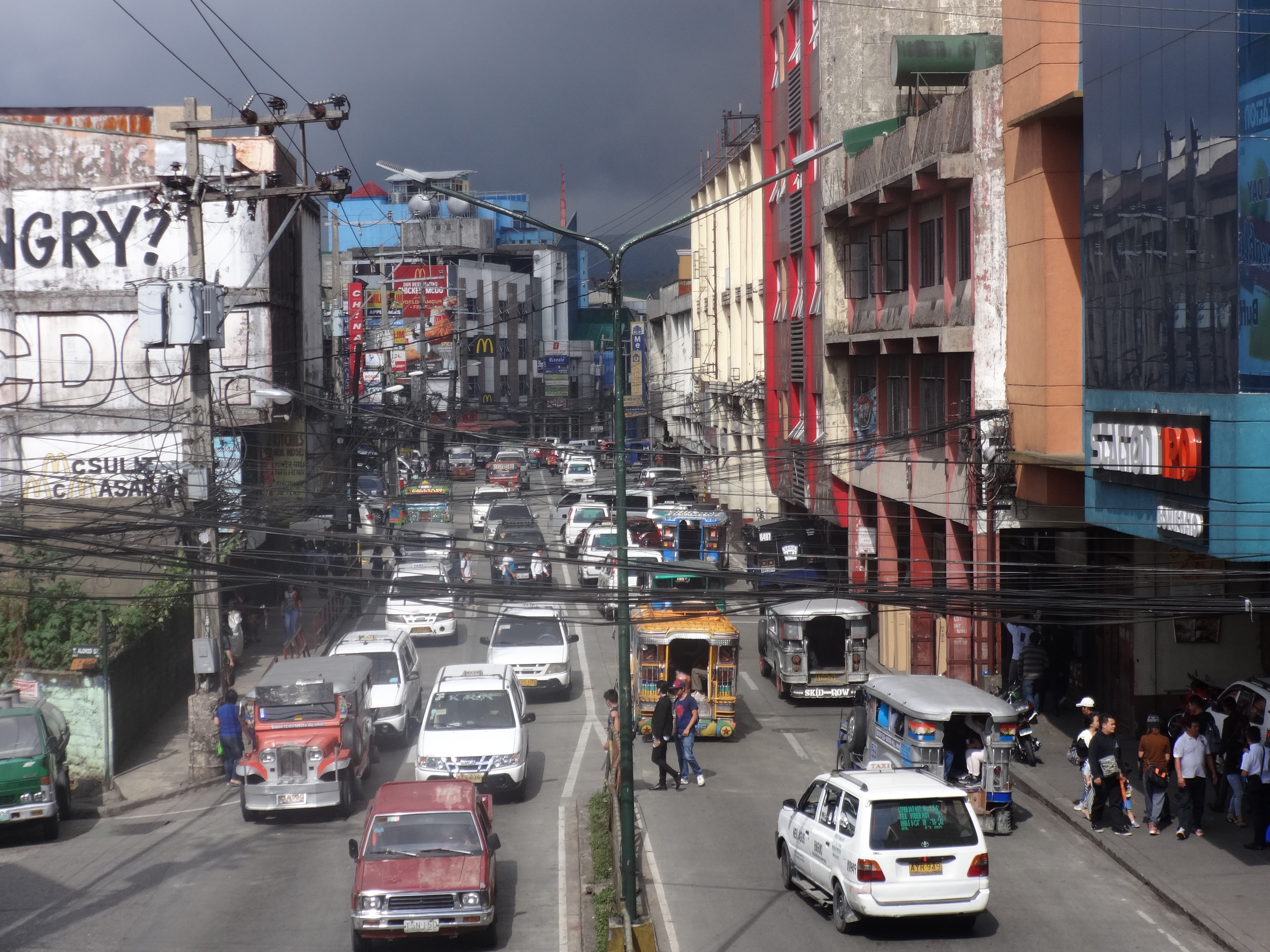
Smog from vehicles in Bonifacio Street in 2018

Baguio suffers from air pollution and is one of the cities with the dirtiest air in the Philippines, according to a 2014 WHO report; a slight improvement in the city's air quality was cited in 2017 by the DENR's Environmental Management Bureau. In a 2018 WHO report, the city was listed as having the most polluted air among 8 other local cities (Cebu, Dagupan, Davao, Manila, San Carlos, Urdaneta and Zamboanga). Eco-vehicles and Euro 4 compliant vehicles have been tested to see whether or not they are suited for the city's steep slopes in line with efforts to modernize its Public Utility Vehicles (PUVs). PUVs, specifically jeepneys, have been pushed for its modernization, in line with President Duterte's PUV modernization initiative.

Another problem that plagues Baguio is its garbage and waste disposal. The city has been dumping its garbage in a landfill in Urdaneta City, but rising costs are putting a strain on the city's budget. In early 2018, the city government started using its garbage transfer station in the city outskirts near Marcos Highway, drawing protests from residents of the nearby town of Tuba, who cited the facility poses health hazards to their communities. As of 2019, the Philippine National Oil Company has offered to test a waste-to-energy technology as a possible solution to its garbage woes. Baguio's waste water treatment plant is also eyed for an expansion as it has been unable to fully cater to the city's needs; wastewater which the plant could not accommodate were dumped in the Balili River, leading to its high coliform levels—even higher than that of Manila Bay's.

== Landscape ==
Baguio is also a planned city. American Architect and Urban Planner Daniel Burnham was commissioned to design the new capital; his design for the city was based on the City Beautiful movement, which features broad streets and avenues radiating out from rectangles.

During the Second World War, Baguio was razed to the ground during the Japanese forces' invasion and the subsequent shelling by American forces during the liberation. After the liberation, rebuilding began and most of the historical buildings were thoroughly reconstructed. However, some of the historic buildings from the 19th century that had been preserved in reasonably reconstructible form were nonetheless eradicated or otherwise left to deteriorate. The 1990 Luzon earthquake further devastated Baguio's old buildings, which include 28 collapsed buildings such as hotels, factories, government and university buildings, and many private homes and establishments.

Baguio's current landscape is mostly of contemporary architecture.

=== Architecture ===
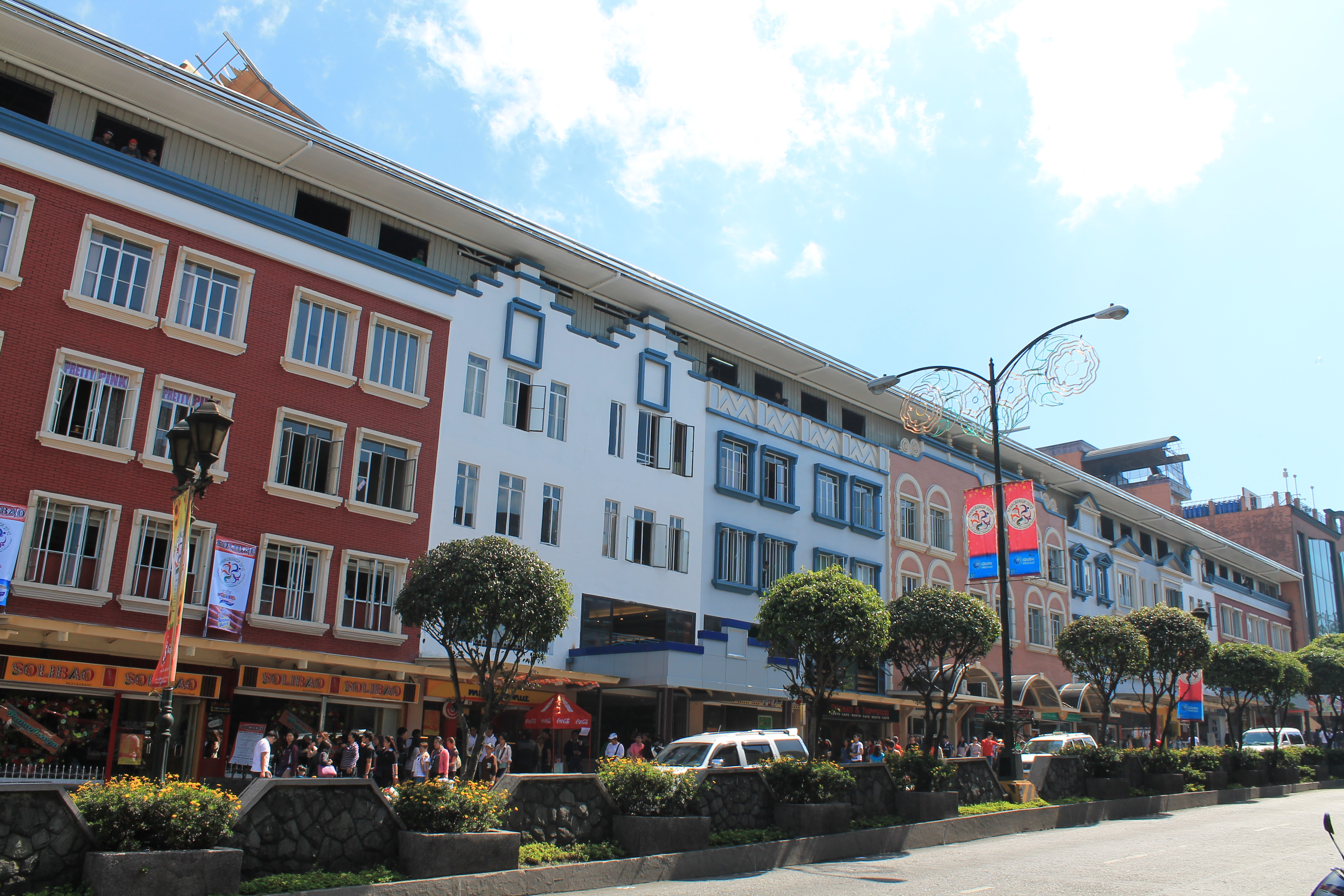
Porta Vaga Mall along Session Road

Baguio's contemporary architecture is largely of American build, since Americans were the ones to establish a station here. A few examples include those built at Teacher's Camp and Camp John Hay, previous American installations in the city as well as the current Baguio City Hall. Some buildings are also influenced by Spanish building concepts, such as Porta Vaga Mall and La Azotea. One of the more modern buildings in the city is SM City Baguio, established in 2003.

Moves by various groups with the goal to preserve these buildings have been made. As a historic building, the Baguio City Hall has faced opposition to renovation of its grounds, since that may be against laws on national cultural heritage sites; the renovations, however, continued as there has been no documentation supporting the City Hall as a national heritage site. The construction of the City Hall park was finished in May 2019 as was said to define the city's new moniker as a creative center for crafts and folk arts.

== Demographics ==
Population census of Baguio
Year	Pop.	±% p.a.
1918	5,464	—
1939	24,117	+7.33%
1948	29,262	+2.17%
1960	50,436	+4.64%
1970	84,538	+5.29%
1975	97,449	+2.89%
1980	119,009	+4.08%
1990	183,142	+4.41%
1995	226,883	+4.09%
2000	252,386	+2.31%
2007	301,926	+2.50%
2010	318,676	+1.98%
2015	345,366	+1.54%
2020	366,358	+1.25%
2024	368,426	+0.14%
Source: Philippine Statistics Authority

The original inhabitants of Baguio are the Ibaloi people (natively pronounced as "Ivadoi"). When the Americans established the city in the early 1900s, early settlers in the city included members of other Igorot tribes (Igudut in Ibaloi), the lowlander Ilocanos (Iduko), Americans (Merikano), and mestizos. A significant number of Chinese (both Cantonese and Hokkien) and Japanese laborers were also hired to build Kennon Road, many of whom later settled in the city.

Baguio is an overpopulated city, having a population density of more than 6,000 people per square kilometer. Originally planned by Daniel Burnham to accommodate 25,000 to 30,000 people, the city's population has swelled to 366,358 persons as of May 2020. The city has a very young age structure as 65.5 percent of its total population is below thirty years old. Females comprise 51.3 percent of the population as against 48.7 percent for males. The household population comprises 98 percent of the total population, or 245,000 persons. With an average of 4.6 members per household, a total of 53,261 households are gleaned. During the peak of the annual tourist influx, particularly during the Lenten period, transients triple the population.

=== Crime ===
Crime in Baguio is concentrated in theft and vehicular accidents. Crime in the city is also directly related to its changing demographics and unique criminal justice system. The illegal drug trade is also a problem of the city as 24 of its 129 barangays are considered as drug affected as of December 2017.

In 2018, Baguio was listed as one of the safest cities both in the ASEAN region, ranking sixth with a crime index of 40.57 and safety index of 59.43. The Baguio City Police Office also has the highest crime solution efficiency nationwide of 84%, compared to the national 77% and the region's 70%. In May 2019 BCPO also reported a drop of 27% in crimes, from 1,150 in 2018 to 834 in 2019. The BCPO was awarded as the country's best city police station in 2018.

=== Religion ===
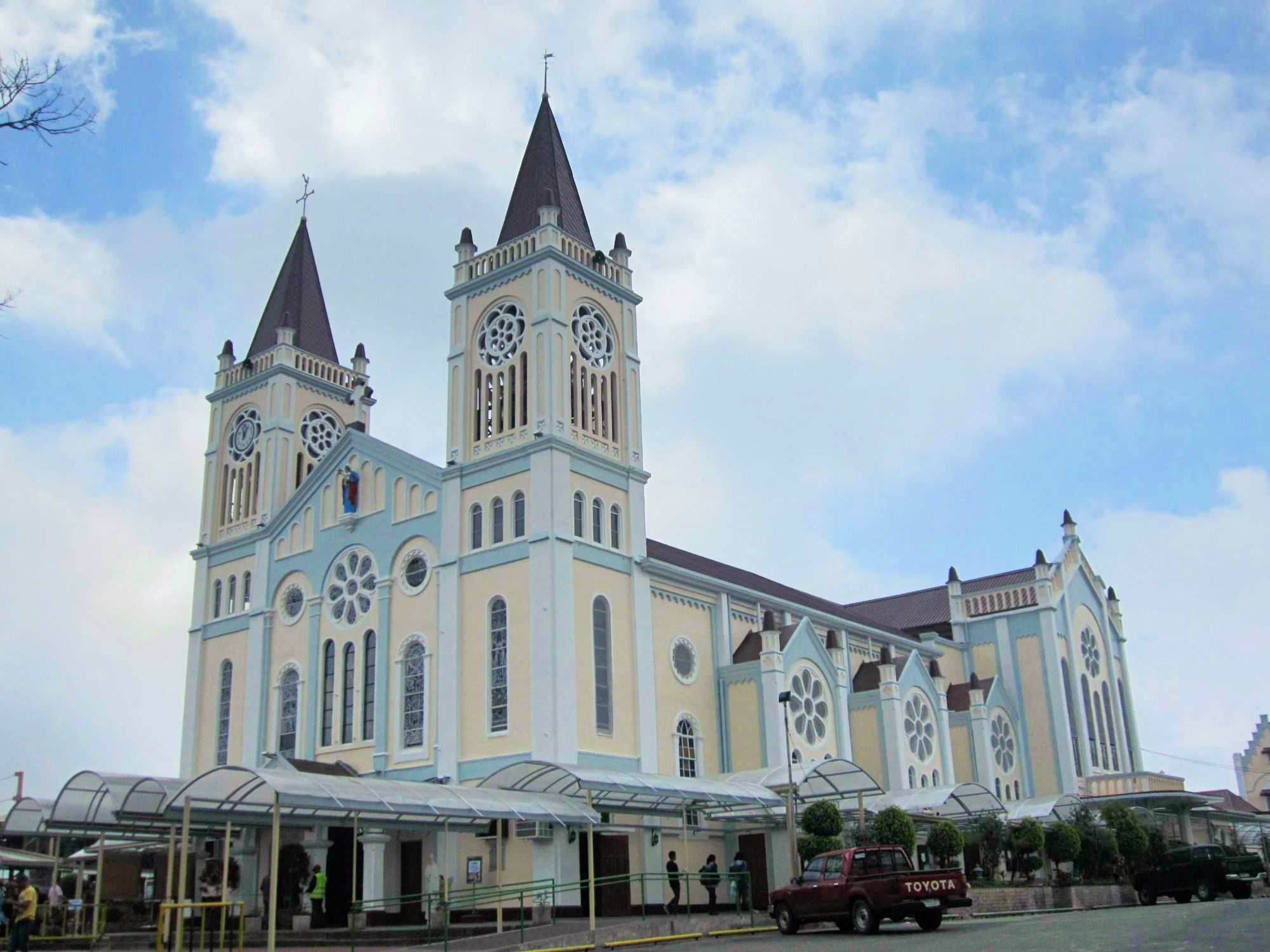
The Cathedral of Our Lady of the Atonement, the seat of the Roman Catholic Diocese of Baguio

Baguio is a predominantly Christian city, as of 2015; Roman Catholics at 74% (254,716), Evangelicals (Philippine Council of Evangelical Churches) at 7% (24,236), National Council of Churches in the Philippines at 5% (17,968), and Iglesia ni Cristo at 4% (13,897).

As of 2015, Muslims comprise 1% (3,269) of the city's total population. The largest mosque in the area is Masjid Al-Maarif, which is a centre of Islamic studies in the Philippines. The city also has smaller numbers of Buddhists and atheists, along with members of other faiths.

== Economy ==
SM City Baguio seen from Burnham Park

Poverty incidence of Baguio (%)

Source: Philippine Statistics Authority

As a melting pot of different peoples and cultures in the Cordillera Administrative Region, numerous investments and business opportunities are lured to Baguio. Baguio has a large retail industry, with shoppers coming to the city to take advantage of the diversity of competitively priced commercial products on sale. The city is also popular with bargain hunters; some of the most popular bargaining areas include Baguio Market and Maharlika Livelihood Center. The city is home to numerous shopping centers and malls catering to increasing commercial and tourist activity; these include: SM City Baguio, Baguio Center Mall, Abanao Square, and Tiong San.

Various food and retail businesses run by local residents proliferate, forming a key part of Baguio's cultural landscape. Several retail outlets and dining outlets are situated along Bonifacio Street, Session Road, Teacher's Camp, Mines View Park and Baguio Fastfood Center near the market.

Maharlika Livelihood Center

The areas of Session Road, Harrison Road, Magsaysay Avenue and Abanao Street, comprise the city's trade center, where commercial and business structures such as cinemas, hotels, restaurants, department stores, and shopping centers are concentrated. The City Market offers a wide array of locally sourced goods and products, usually from Benguet province, which includes colorful woven fabrics and hand-strung beads to primitive wood carvings, cut flowers, strawberries and "Baguio" vegetables. The term 'Baguio vegetables' often denotes vegetable types that thrive in the cooler growing climate. Strawberries and string beans—referred to as Baguio beans across the Philippines—are shipped to major urban markets across the archipelago.

Another key source of income for Baguio is its position as the economic hub of the Cordillera Administrative Region. The economy of the city has benefited from the vibrant mining industry in several towns of Benguet. Many agricultural goods produced in Benguet pass through Baguio for processing, sale or further distribution to the lowlands.

=== Industrial ===
Baguio is one of the Philippines' most profitable and best investment areas.

A Philippine Economic Zone Authority (PEZA)-accredited business and industrial park called the Baguio City Economic Zone (BCEZ) is located in the southern part of the city between Camp John Hay Country Club and Philippine Military Academy in Barangay Loakan. Firms located in the BCEZ mostly produce and export knitted clothing, transistors, small components for vehicles, electronics and computer parts. Notable firms include Texas Instruments Philippines, which is the second largest exporter in the country. Other companies headquartered within the economic zone include Baguio Ayalaland Technohub, Moog Philippines, Inc., Linde Philippines, Inc., LTX Philippines Corporation, and Sitel Philippines, Baguio.

=== Outsourcing ===
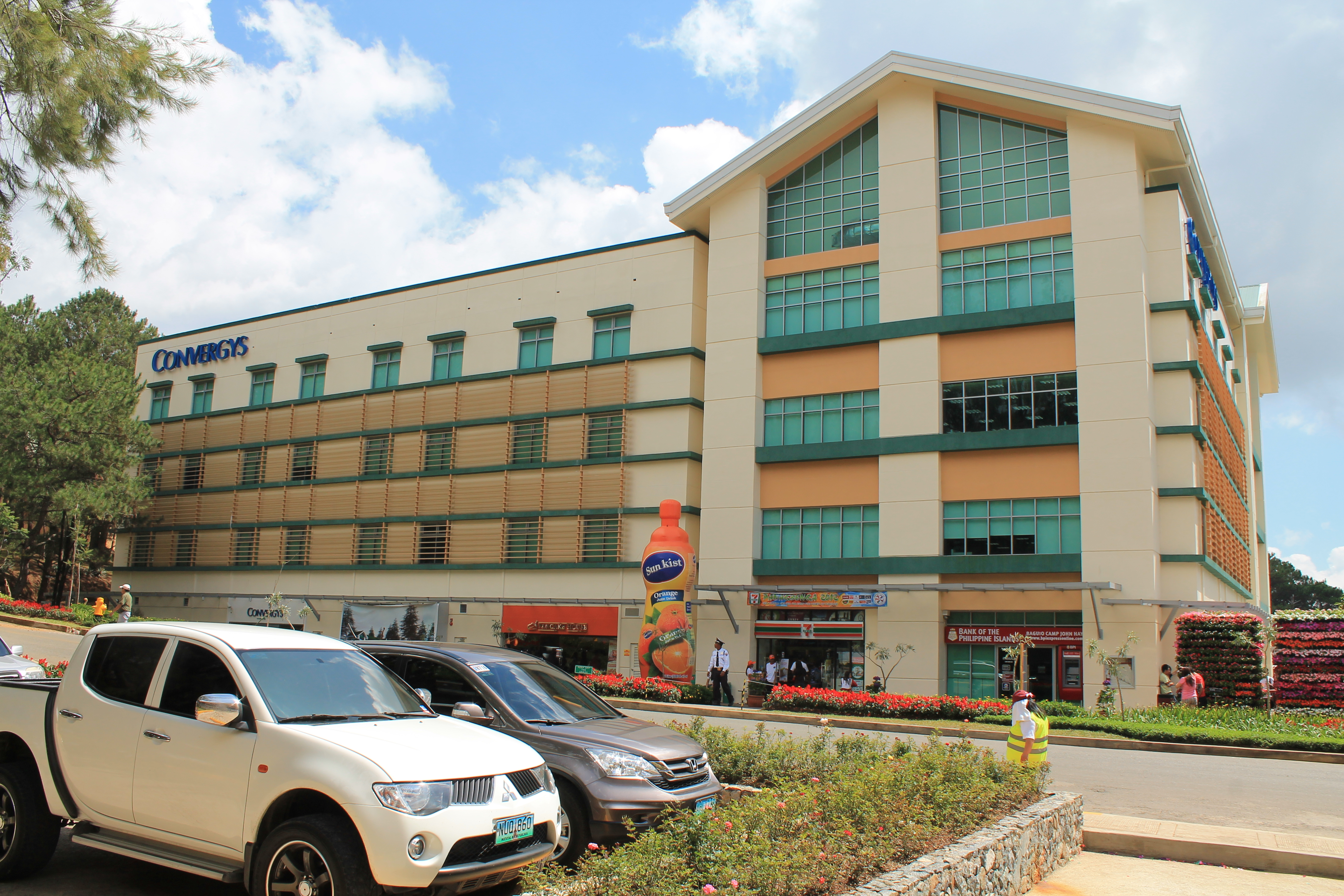
A building hosting a BPO in Baguio

Outsourcing contributes to the city's economy and employment. Sitel, whose main office is located in the Baguio City Economic Zone, is the largest BPO company in the city with four sites established within the BCEZ. There are also multiple BPOs present in the city with numerous PEZA-accredited private economic zones established to cater to this industry. The Ayala Technohub located in Camp John Hay hosts Concentrix and InterContinental Hotels Group alongside other commercial establishments. Teleperformance Baguio and Thoughtfocus is established at the SM Cyberzone Building (also known as SM Fiesta Strip) located in front of Sunshine Park, while other call centers downtown are Optimum Transsource, Sterling Global and Global Translogic. Tech-Synergy operates a large transcription and back office operation near Wright park.

In recent years, there has been a surge of ESL (English as a Second Language) Tutorial Schools throughout Baguio that caters to students from other countries and also provide online services. This industry however has been hit hard by the COVID-19 pandemic with foreign students returning to their home countries.

== Culture ==
=== Arts and museums ===
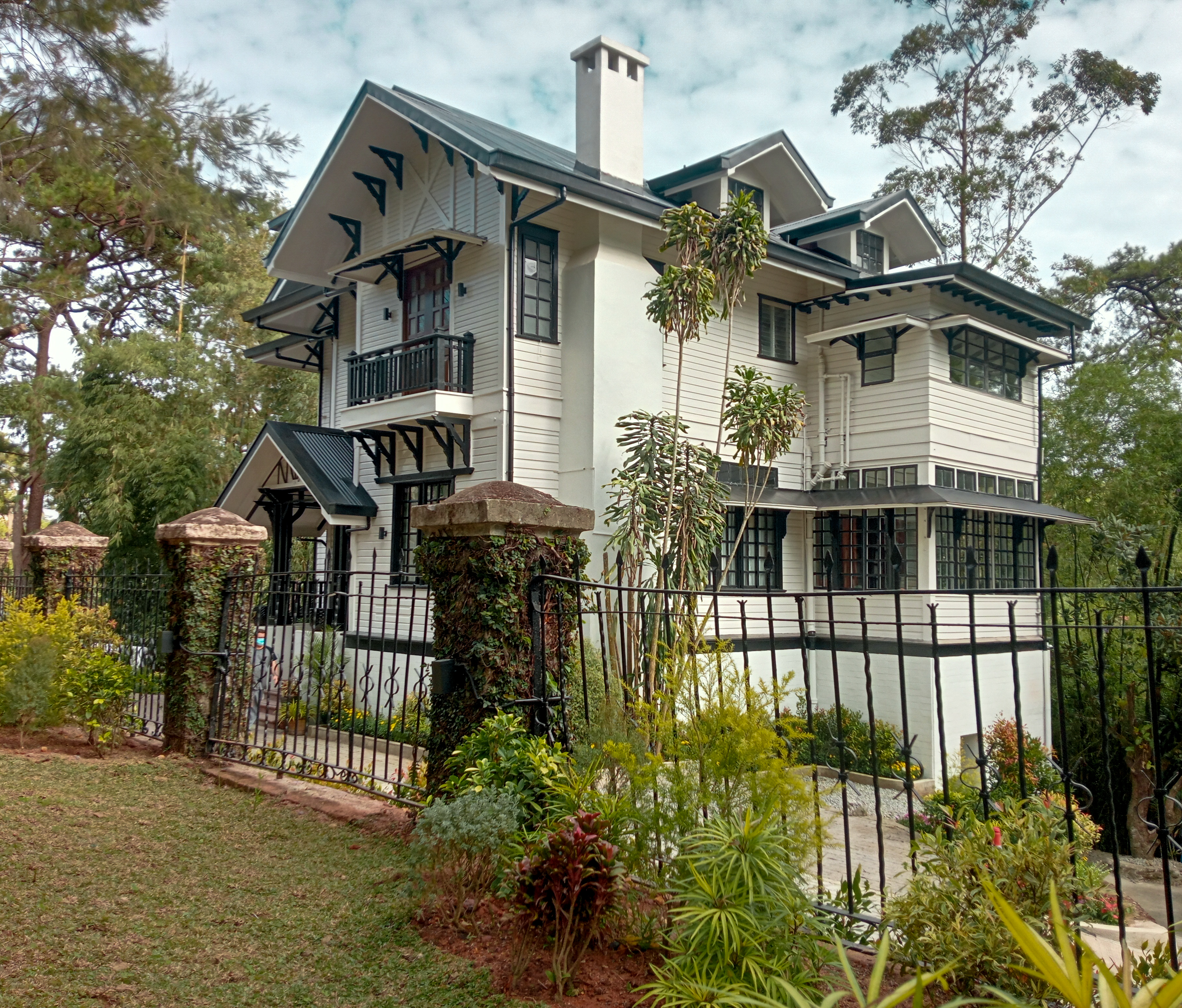
Laperal White House

The city became a haven for many Filipino artists in the 1970s–1990s. Drawn by the cool climate and low cost of living, artists such as Ben Cabrera (now a National Artist) and filmmaker Butch Perez relocated to the city. At the same time, locals such as mixed-media artist Santiago Bose and filmmaker Kidlat Tahimik were also establishing work in the city. Even today, artists like painters and sculptors from all over the country are drawn to the Baguio Arts Festival which is held annually. The city houses several museums, such as the Baguio Museum, Museo Kordilyera, Emilio F. Aguinaldo Museum, and the SLU Museum of Arts and Cultures. The Mansion House located at Wright Park was also re-opened to the public as a presidential museum.

Baguio has been included in UNESCO's Creative Cities Network due to craft and folk art traditions of the city particularly ranging on expressions to wood carving, silver craft, traditional weaving and tattooing. Baguio is the first city in the Philippines to be part of the inter-city network which aims to promote the creative industries as well as integrate culture in sustainable urban development.

=== Languages ===
The languages commonly spoken in Baguio are Ilocano, Tagalog, and English. Languages like Ibaloi, Kankanaey, Pangasinan, Cantonese, Hokkien, Japanese, Korean, Kapampangan, Cebuano, Hiligaynon, Maranao, Maguindanaon and Tausug are also spoken to varying degrees by their respective ethnic communities within the city.

=== Media ===
In 1939, when the country's literacy was below 50%, the city already had a weekly paper. Manila Bulletin's predecessor, The Manila Daily Bulletin, published a weekly supplement, Baguio Bulletin.

Local and regional newspapers circulating in Baguio include the Baguio Midland Courier, Baguio Herald Express, Zigzag Weekly, and Baguio Chronicle.

Baguio Midland Courier was the largest newspaper publication around Baguio and Cordillera Administrative Region. It started out as a four-page tabloid on April 28, 1947, by Sinai Hamada and siblings Oseo and Cecilia. Sinai was its first and longest-lasting editor-in-chief while his older brother Oseo managed its business operations. Circa 1963, it distributed 7,500 copies. It launched its website in its 60th anniversary. The Baguio Midland Courier announced its closure effective July 22, 2024 and it issued its final edition on July 21, 2024. Baguio Midland Courier's publisher, Hamada Printers & Publishers Corp., also ceased the operation of their social media pages and website on October 31, 2024. The publisher donated archives of Baguio Midland Courier issues to the Baguio City Library and Benguet Provincial Library for use by the public.

=== Festivals and holidays ===
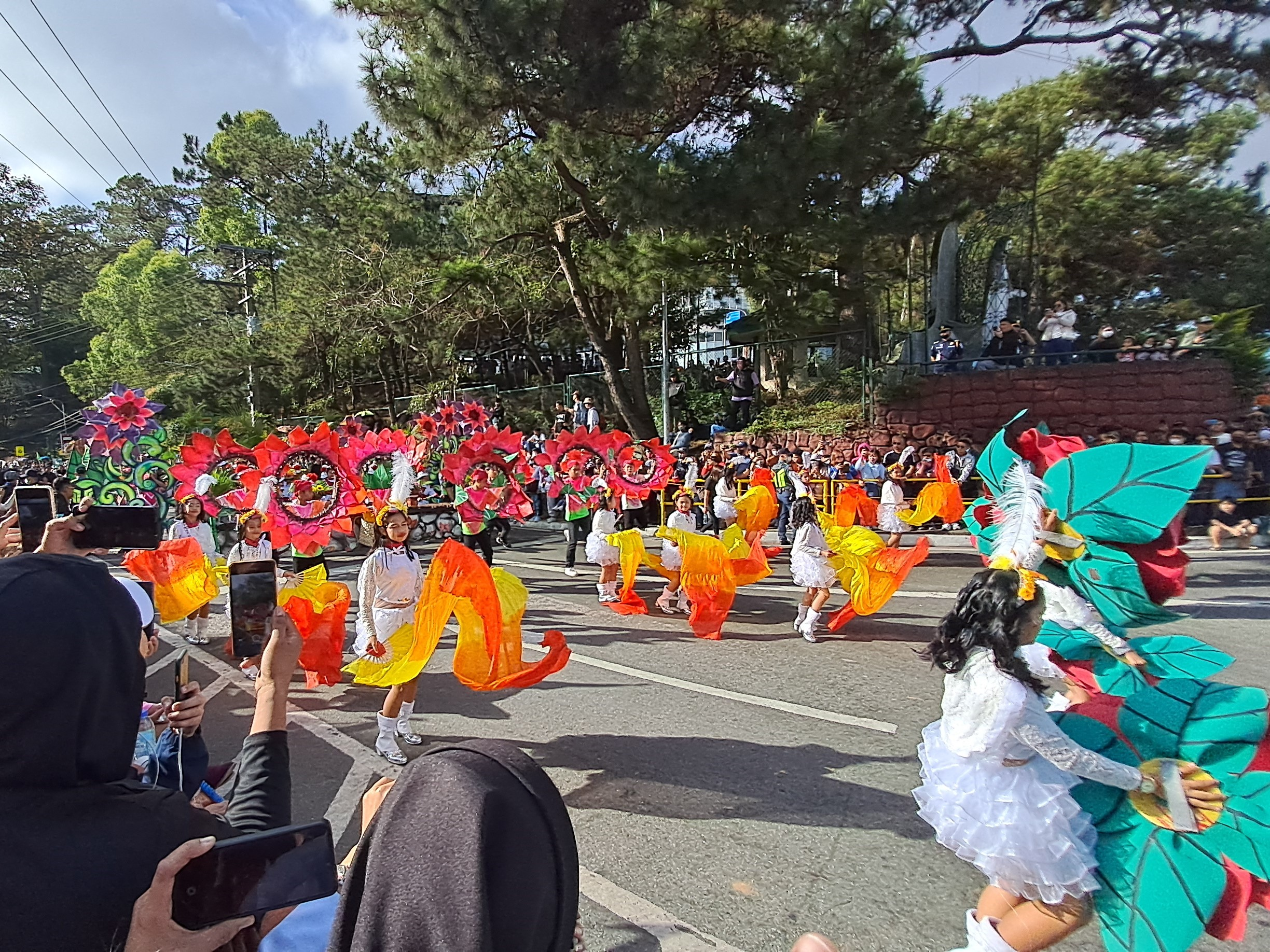
Panagbenga Festival

The annual flower festival, called the Panagbenga Festival, is held every February; it was created to highlight the city's flowers and cool temperature and as a way to rise up from the devastation of the 1990 Luzon earthquake. The festival includes floats covered mostly with flowers; it also includes street dancing, presented by dancers clad in flower-inspired costumes inspired by the Bendian, an Ibaloi dance of celebration. The indigenous people were initially wary with government-led tourism due to a perceived threat that the government would interfere with or change their communities' rituals.

The annual Gong Festival is celebrated on the 29th of October. Baguio Gong Day coincides with the National Indigenous Peoples’ Thanksgiving Day. The festivity includes the Gaddang people's courtship dances palakis and the takik and the symbolic beating of the seven gongs to attain peace, unity and cultural heritage preservation.

Baguio celebrates its city charter anniversary every September 1, which has been declared as a special non-working holiday in 1989 through Republic Act 6710.

== Tourism ==
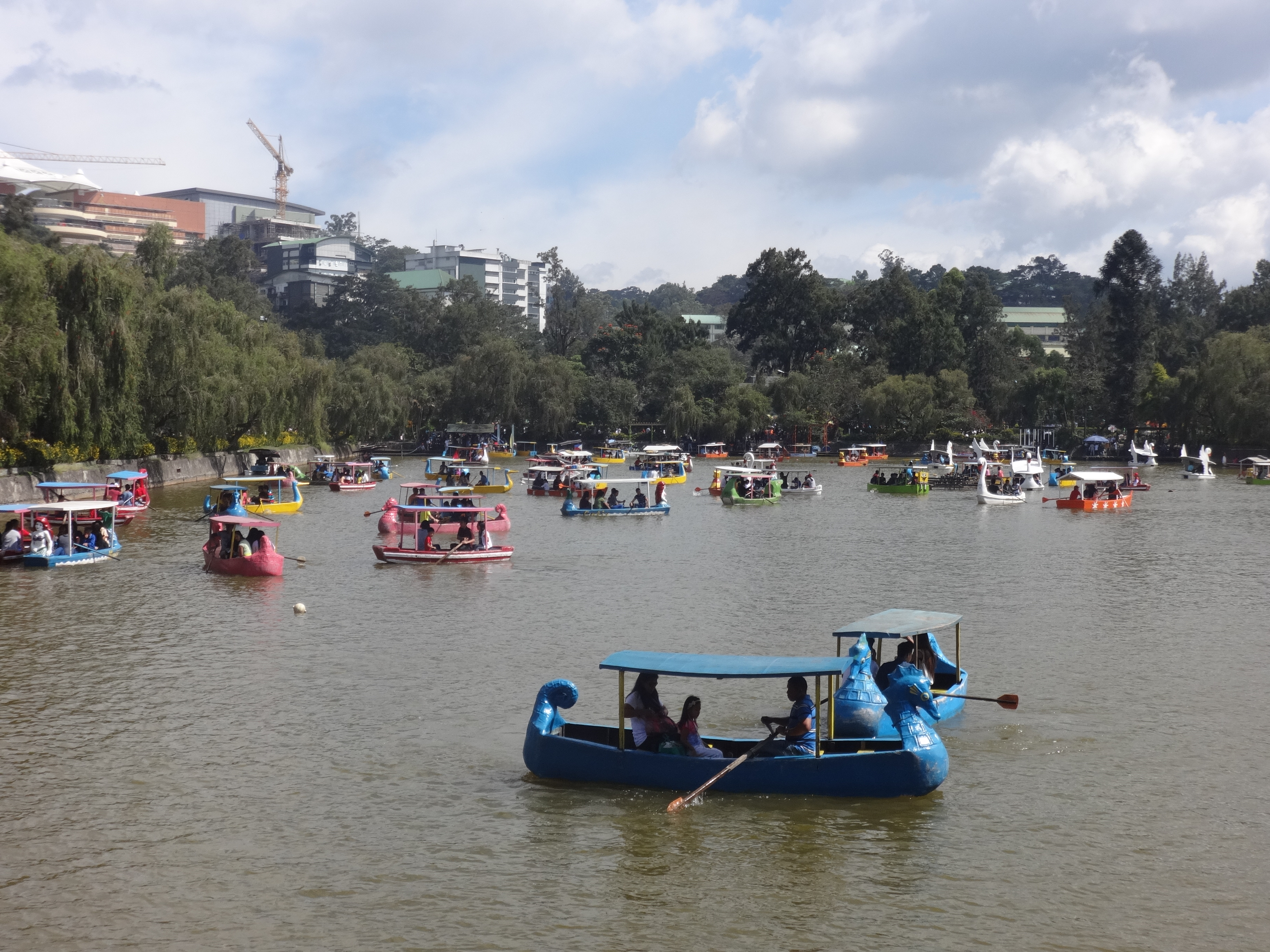
Burnham Park Lake

Tourism is one of Baguio's main industries due to its cool climate and history. The city is one of the country's top tourist destinations. During the year end holidays some people from the lowlands prefer spending their vacation in Baguio, to experience cold temperatures they rarely have in their home provinces. Also, during the summer, especially during Holy Week, tourists from all over the country flock to the city. During this time, the total number of people in the city doubles. To accommodate visitors, there are more than 80 hotels and inns available, as well as numerous transient houses set up by the locals. Local festivities such as the Panagbenga Festival also attract both local and foreign tourists. In early 2026, a rare bloom of sakura (Japanese cherry blossoms) occurred at the Baguio Country Club in the Philippines, marking the first significant flowering of the trees in the country in seven years. The bloom attracted scores of local visitors and tourists alike. This event illustrated how climatic conditions in higher-elevation areas warmer Asian climates can occasionally support temperate flora typically associated with East Asia.

Baguio is the lone Philippine destination in the 2011 TripAdvisor Traveller's Choice Destinations Awards (Asia category) with the city being among the top 25 destinations in Asia. Burnham Park, Mines View Park, Wright Park, The Mansion, and Botanical Garden are among the popular tourist sites in Baguio.

== Government ==
=== Local government ===
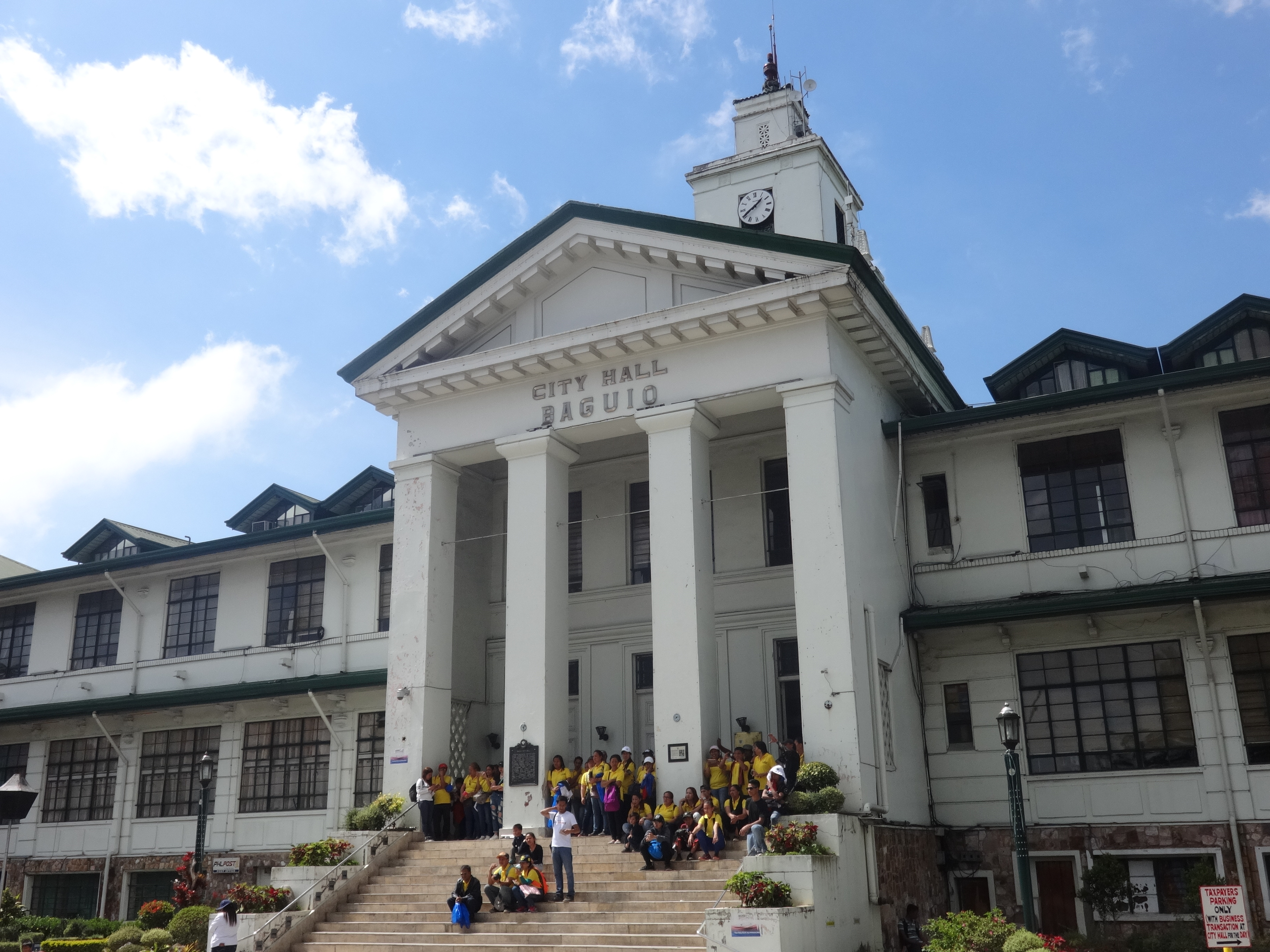
Baguio City Hall

As a highly urbanized city with its own charter, it is not subject to the jurisdiction of Benguet province, of which it was formerly a part.

The City of Baguio is led by its own mayor and vice mayor. The vice mayor leads the city council, composed of 12 elected councilors and 3 ex-officio members (the ABC President, SK President, and IPMR of the city). The City Government holds office at the Baguio City Hall.

The 129 barangays are led by their own captains assisted by a 7-man barangay council.

These officials are term-limited by up to 3 consecutive terms, with each term lasting for 3 years.

=== Elected officials ===
The city government's composition as of June 30, 2025:

City Government of Baguio
Position	Name	Year elected	Term no.
Congressman	Mauricio G. Domogan	2025	1
Mayor	Benjamin B. Magalong	2019	3
Vice Mayor	Faustino A. Olowan	2019	3
Councilor	Edison R. Bilog	2025	1
Councilor	Joel A. Alangsab	2025	1
Councilor	Jose M. Molintas	2022	2
Councilor	Leandro B. Yangot Jr.	2022	2
Councilor	Vladimir D. Cayabas	2019	3
Councilor	Peter C. Fianza	2022	2
Councilor	Van Oliver M. Dicang	2025	1
Councilor	Fred L. Bagbagen	2019	3
Councilor	Paolo Raynor E. Salvosa	2025	1
Councilor	Betty Lourdes F. Tabanda	2019	3
Councilor	Yuri K. Weygan	2025	1
Councilor	Elmer O. Datuin	2022	2
Councilor (ex-officio member) ABC President	Rocky M. Aliping	2024	1
Councilor (ex-officio member) SK President	John Rhey L. Mananeng	2023	1
Councilor (ex-officio member) Indigenous People's Mandatory Representative (IPMR)	Maximo H. Edwin Jr.	2023	2

=== Congress representation ===
Baguio is represented in the House of Representatives by its own congressman, Mauricio G. Domogan. The city is a lone district, separate from the province of Benguet.

=== Summer residences ===
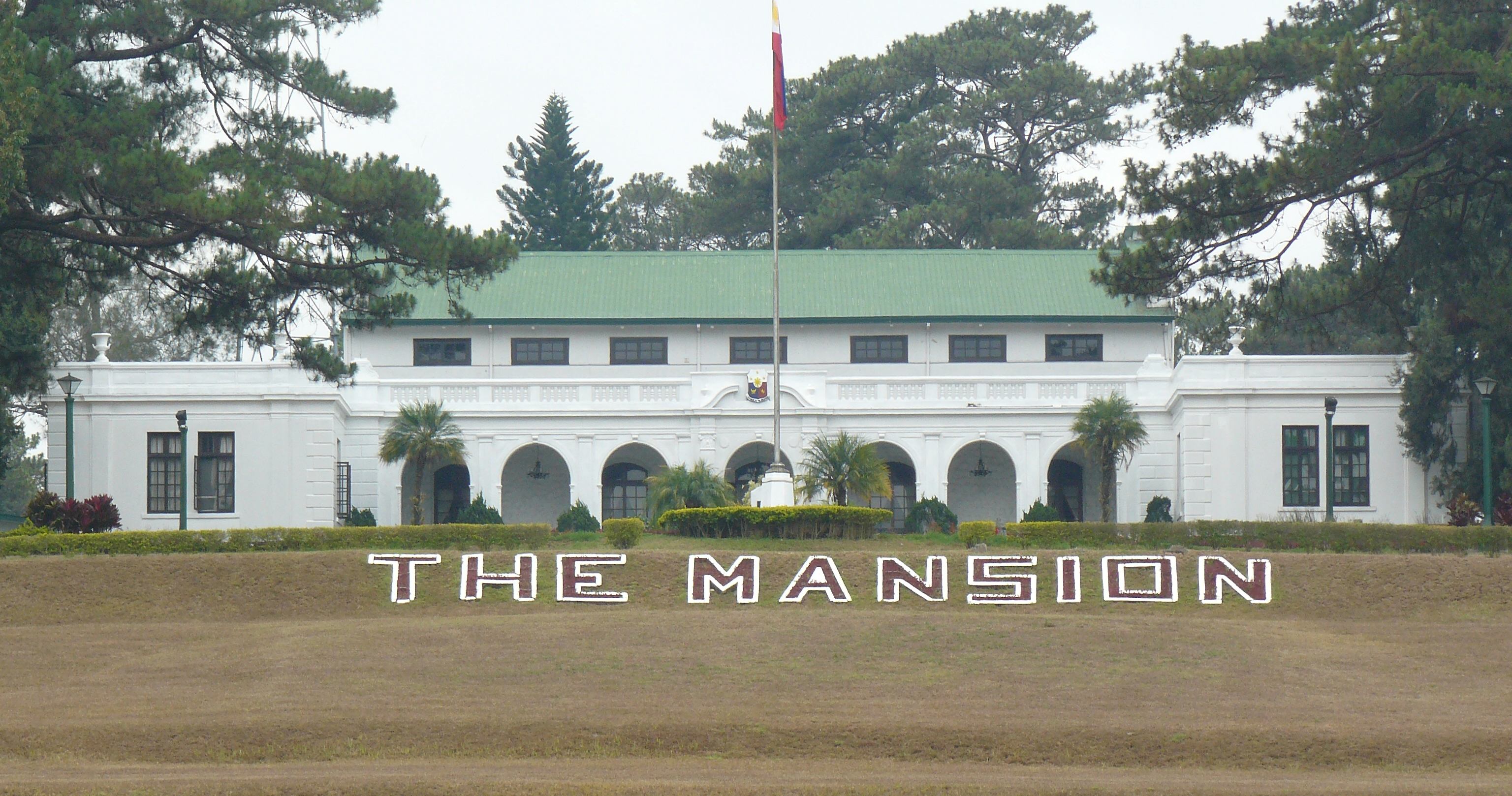
The Mansion serves as the summer residence of the President of the Philippines.

The city hosts the summer residences of the President, Vice President, Senate President and House Speaker at Barangay Lualhati, while the Supreme Court, Court of Appeals and the Cabinet Secretaries cottages are housed at Cabinet Hill. The Supreme Court and Court of Appeals hold summer sessions in the city, usually during the month of April.

== Sports ==
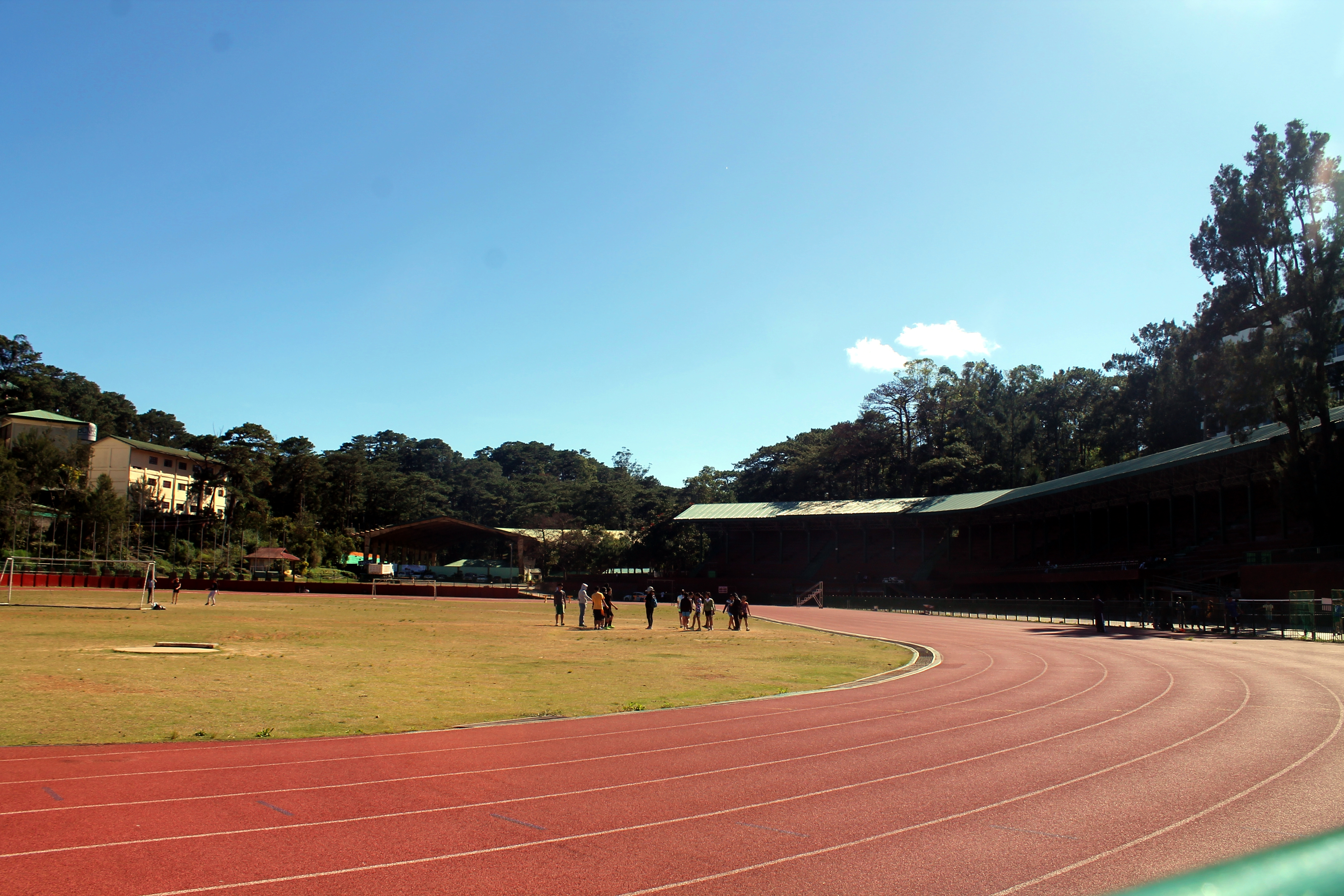
Baguio Athletic Bowl

Baguio has hosted several sporting events, even those of international standing. The Baguio Athletic Bowl within the grounds of Burnham Park is one of Baguio's primary sporting venues. Baguio hosted the 1978 World Chess Championship match between Anatoly Karpov and Viktor Korchnoi, building the Baguio Convention Center for that purpose. The city is a participant in the CARAA games or the Cordillera Administrative Region Athletic Association, hosting it last in 2016 and 2017. The winners of the said event will eventually represent the region in the annual Palarong Pambansa games, which is also sponsored by the Department of Education. As of 2019, the city is still the overall champion with 205 gold, 110 silver and 79 bronze medals.

In recent years, Baguio has been racking up titles and medals in the field of Mixed Martial Arts led by Team Lakay.

== Infrastructure ==
=== Transportation ===
==== Air ====
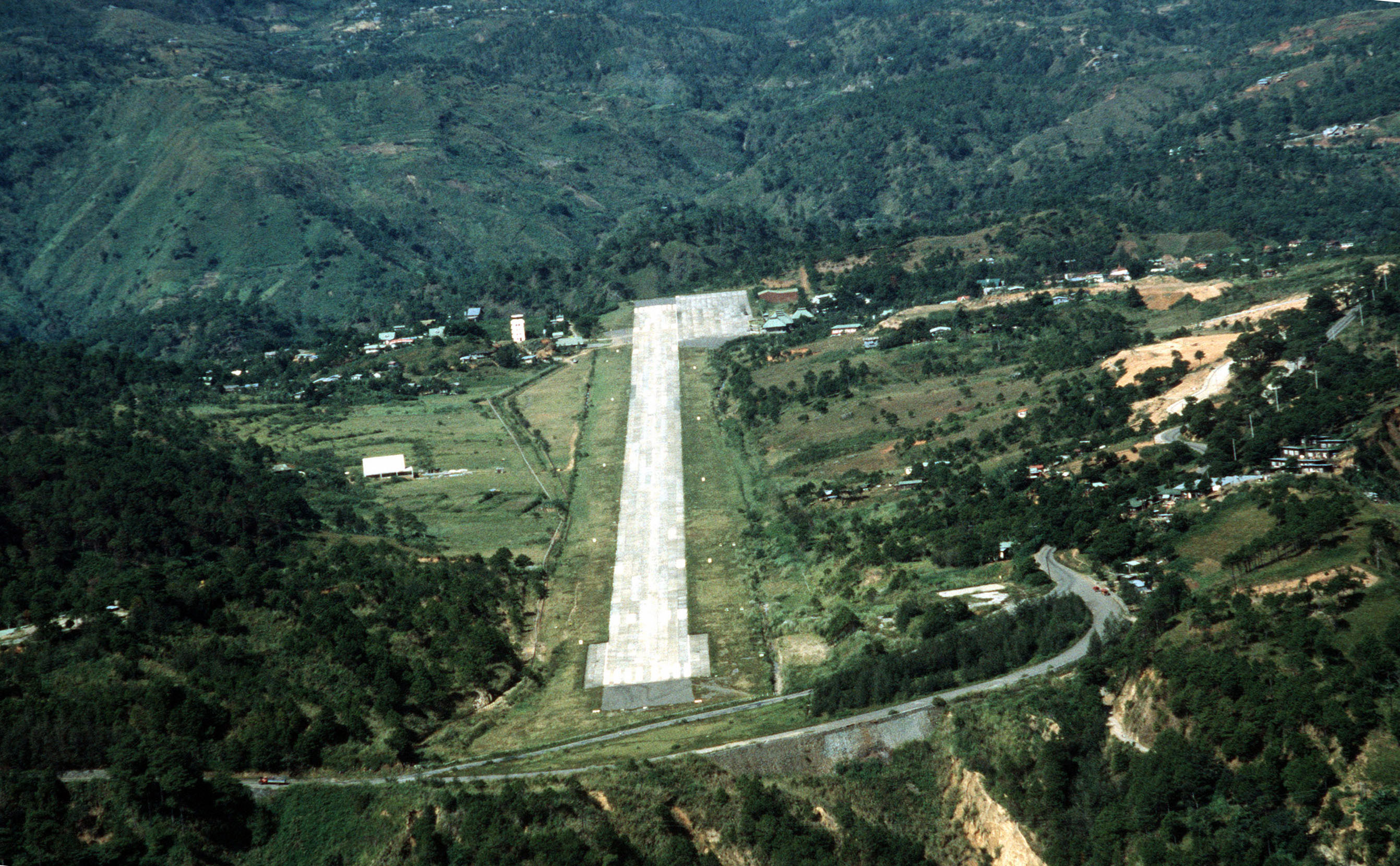
Loakan Airport runway in the outskirts of the city

Loakan Airport is the lone airport serving the general area of Baguio. The airport is classified as a trunkline airport, or a major commercial domestic airport, by the Civil Aviation Authority of the Philippines. Major commercial operations to Baguio however ceased after Philippine Airlines closed their Baguio route in 1998. There were attempts to reopen Baguio routes throughout the following two decades by different airline operators such as Asian Spirit and Sky Pasada but none were able to sustain continuous operation. Commercial flights resumed in 2022 with Philippine Airlines (operated by PAL Express) operating Baguio–Cebu flights and vice versa but operations were halted by Philippine Airlines in July 2024 because of poor passenger traffic.

The airport is located south of the city center. Due to the limited length of the runway, being only 1,802 m (5,912 ft) long, it is restricted to commuter size aircraft. The airport is used primarily by helicopters, turbo-prop and piston engine aircraft, although on rare occasions light business jets (LBJ) have flown into the airport.

==== Land ====
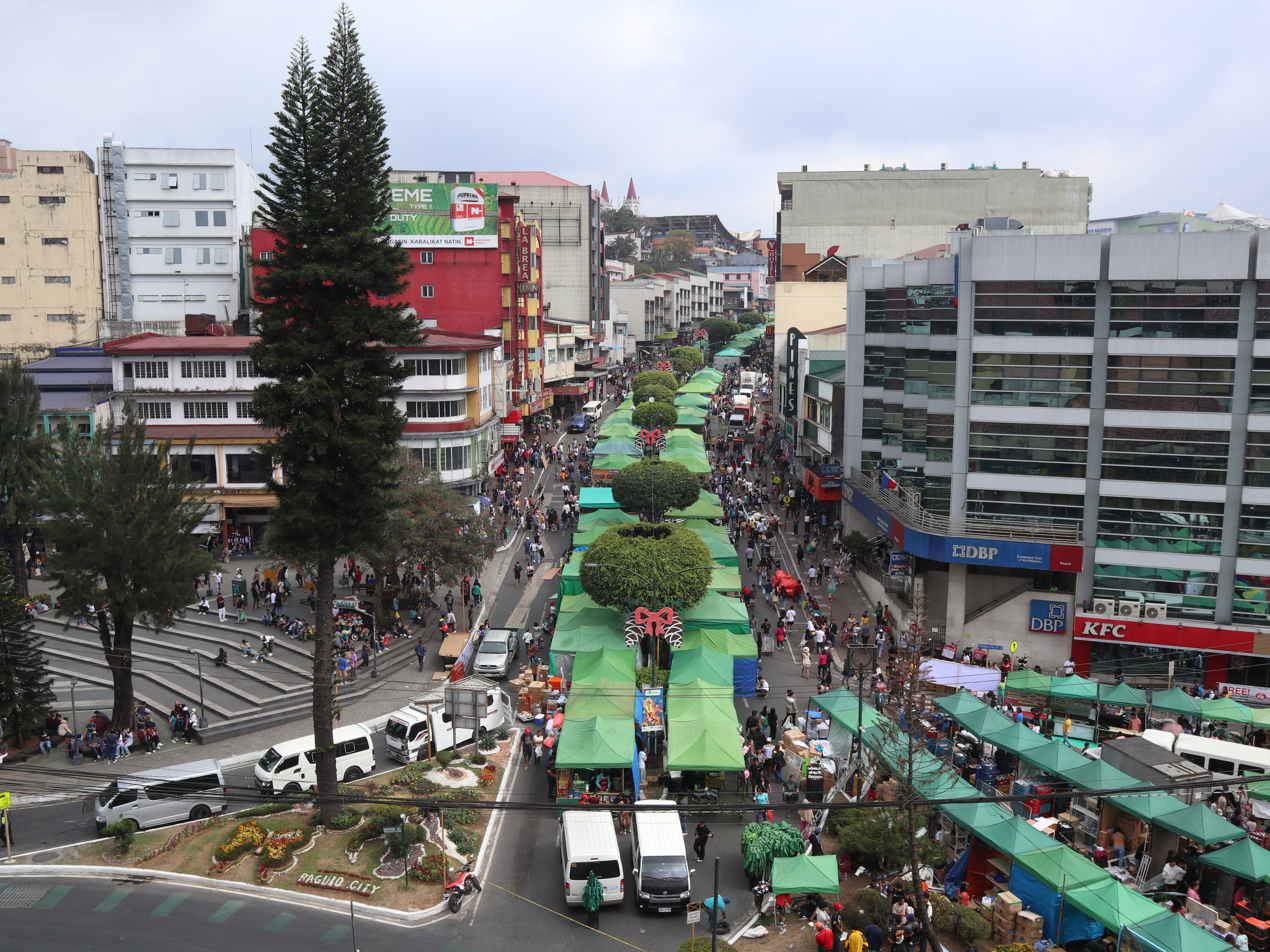
Session Road, one of Baguio's primary roads

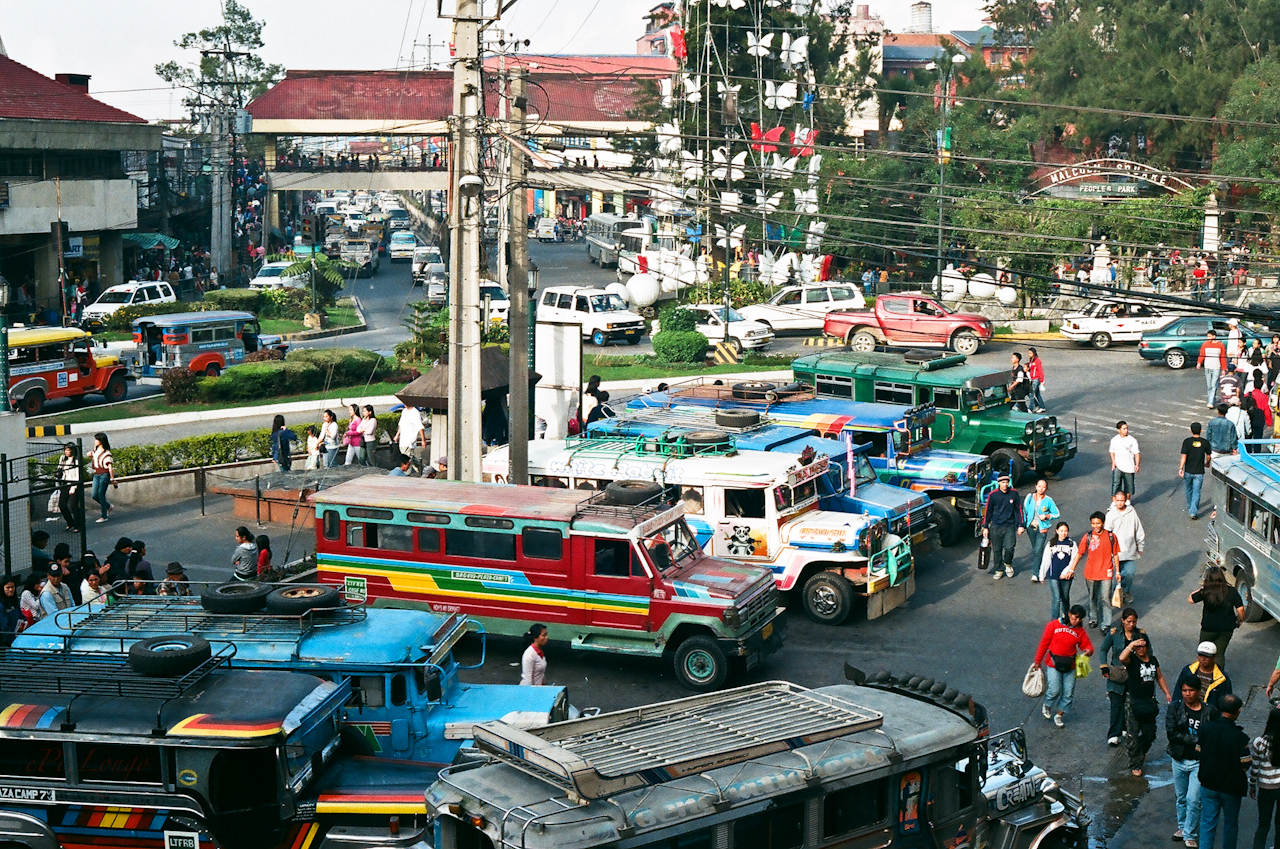
Jeepney terminal in downtown Baguio

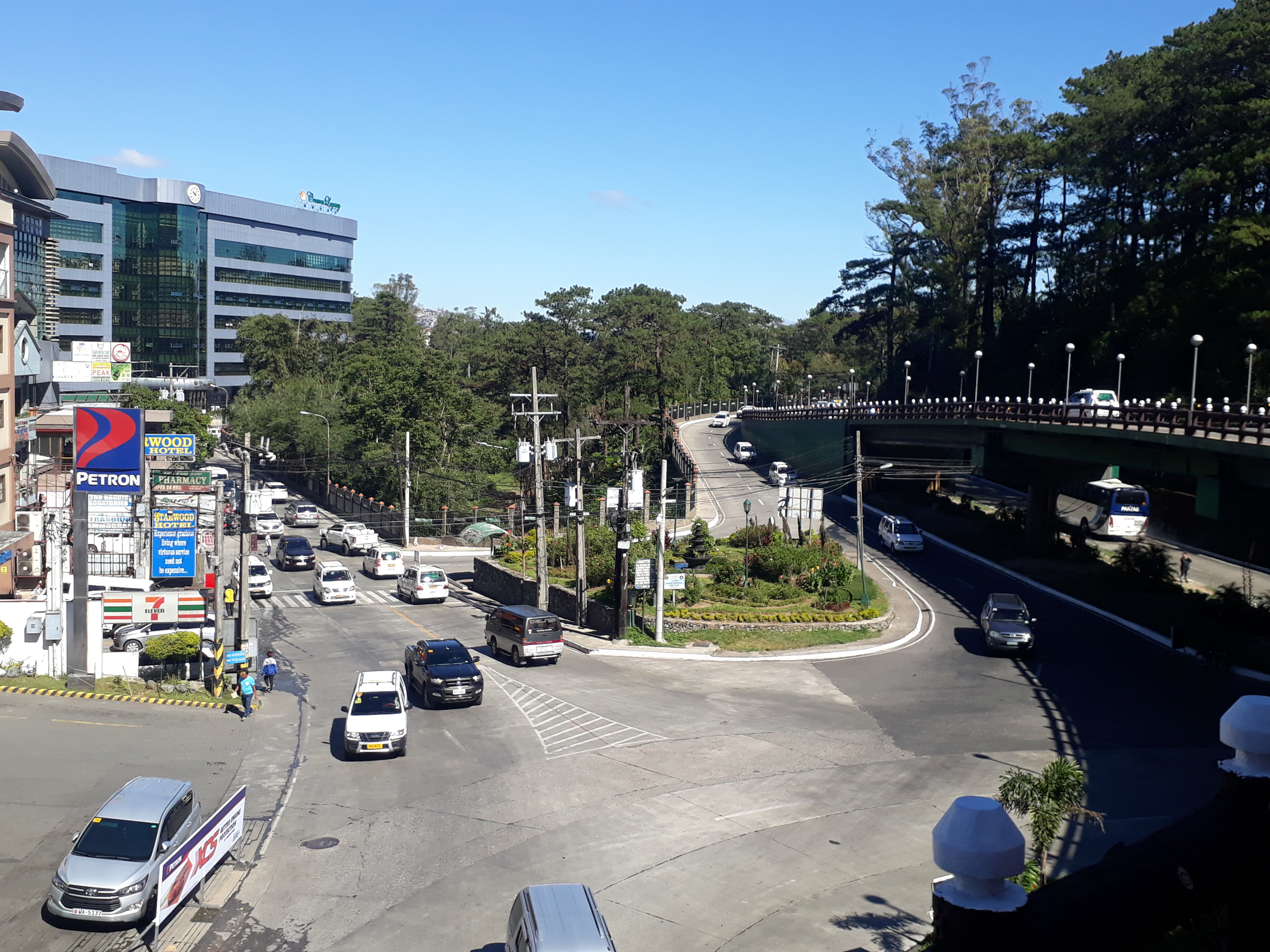
Flyover in Baguio

Jeepneys and taxis are the main means of public transportation in the city. The government's push for jeepney modernization has led to an increase of modern EURO 4 compliant PUVs plying Baguio's center. The rollout however for full jeepney modernization had been hampered by the COVID-19 pandemic. There are several bus lines linking Baguio with Manila, Bontoc, Mariveles, Olongapo, Cabanatuan, and provinces such as Pangasinan, Pampanga, Bataan, Nueva Ecija, Aurora, Cavite, La Union, Nueva Vizcaya and those in the Ilocos regions. Notable bus companies that operate the Baguio to Manila routes are Victory Liner, Genesis Transport and its premium bus line JoyBus, and Solid North.

From Metro Manila, Baguio is accessible via NLEX (from Bulacan to Pampanga), SCTEX (Pampanga to Tarlac) and TPLEX (from Tarlac to La Union). The three main access roads leading to Baguio from the lowlands are Kennon Road (formerly known as the Benguet Road), Aspiras–Palispis Highway (previously known as Marcos Highway) and Naguilian Road, also known as Quirino Highway. The newest road that connects the city to the lowlands is Asin Road (also known as Asin-San Pascual-Tubao, La Union Road). All these roads traverse the municipality of Tuba, Benguet.

- Kennon Road starts in Rosario, La Union and winds upwards through a narrow, steep valley. This is often the fastest route to Baguio but it is particularly perilous, with landslides during the rainy season and sharp dropoffs, some without guardrails. The recently passed Republic Act No. 11604 pushes for the full rehabilitation of Kennon Road as an all-weather highway.
- Aspiras-Palispis Highway starts in Agoo, La Union and connects to Palispis Highway, at the boundary of Benguet and La Union provinces.
- Asin-Tubao Road starts in Tubao, La Union and serves as secondary alternative road if gridlock occurs at Aspiras-Palispis Highway
- Naguilian Road, which starts in Bauang, La Union, are both longer routes but are much safer than Kennon Road especially during rainy season, and are the preferred routes for coaches, buses and trucks.

The Benguet-Nueva Vizcaya Road, which links Baguio to Aritao in Nueva Vizcaya province, traverses the towns of Itogon, Bokod, and Kayapa.

Another road, Halsema Highway, (also known as the Baguio-Bontoc Road or the Mountain Trail) leads north through the mountainous portion of the provinces of Benguet and Mountain Province; it starts at the northern border of Baguio with La Trinidad.

Since 2021, Baguio has developed its own bicycle lane network consisting of shared lanes (Class 3) and segregated lanes with paint and physical separators (Class 2) on existing roads. As of 2024, the city has implemented 15.321 km (9.520 mi) of Class 3 lanes, 1.6 km (0.99 mi) of Class 2 lanes with paint separation, and 0.083 km (0.052 mi) Class 2 lanes with physical separation.

===== HoHo Bus =====
In an effort to address traffic congestion and the lack of car parking at tourist spots in the city, Baguio operates an experimental free bus shuttle service called the Hop On, Hop Off (HoHo) Tourist Bus. Through a park and ride scheme, the service encourages tourists with private vehicles to park their vehicles at the Baguio Convention Center (BCC) for a fee and ride the bus to various tourist sites free of charge. Relaunched on July 15, 2022, the HoHo bus has scheduled departure and arrival times, operating a looped route between the BCC, the Baguio Botanical Garden, the Mansion House, Mines View Park, Wright Park, and Governor Pack Road. The bus service has an estimated waiting interval of 30 minutes and is operational from 8:30 AM to 6:20 PM daily. The operations of the HoHo bus was eventually suspended at the end of the year.

All times are in Philippine Standard Time (UTC+08:00).

List of stops
Destination	First trip	Last trip	Location	
BCC	8:30 AM	4:30 PM	Military Cut-off	Baguio
Botanical Garden	9:05 AM	5:05 PM	Saint Joseph Village	Baguio
The Mansion	9:25 AM	5:25 PM	Lualhati	Baguio
Mines View Park	9:50 AM	5:50 PM	Mines View Park	Baguio
Wright Park	10:20 AM	6:20 PM	Lualhati	Baguio
Governor Pack Road	—	—	Session Road Area	Baguio
Stops, stations and transit systems in italics are either under construction or proposed.

==== Possible future modes ====
- Cable Cars - As of July 8, 2019, Secretary Tugade of the Department of Transportation said that the feasibility study for the installation of the cable cars in Manila may be finished within the year, with Baguio soon to follow. The Philippine government earlier secured a P27 million grant from France for this venture, with Manila and Baguio seen as possible initial sites.
- Monorail - A monorail project from Baguio to La Trinidad is being mulled over by the SSS as a possible investment in CAR. It is seen to further boost tourism and decongest traffic. The project is similar to the one installed by the Department of Science and Technology at the UP Campus in 2012.

=== Water and electricity ===
Most of the water supply of the city is provided for by the Baguio Water District, founded in 1975 as the successor to the now-defunct Department of Public Services. It currently operates 60 deep wells to cater to its more than 300,000 consumers. It currently serves 122 out of the 129 barangays in the city and some parts of Tuba, Benguet. In recent years, the BWD has expressed concern over the city's depleting water supply, due in part to private wells dug by private individuals and companies.

Electric services are provided by Benguet Electric Cooperative (BENECO), the sole electric power distributor in Benguet. In 2012, a bill was filled in the House of Representatives seeking the creation of the Baguio Electric Cooperative or BAELCO, an entity to provide for the city's own electricity needs, separate from BENECO. Its creation has been met with opposition by various groups citing the need of a feasibility study on the separation. The creation of a separate electric franchise for Baguio would also infringe on BENECO's existing franchise that mandated BENECO to provide electricity for both Baguio and Benguet which would create legal implications if it was to be amended.

The city is also the only local government unit to own and operate its own renewable energy plant. Originally constructed in the 1920s, the Asin Mini Hydropower Plants 1, 2 and 3 located in Tuba, Benguet came under the city's possession after the lapse of the 25-year lease agreement with the Aboitiz-owned Hydroelectric Development Corporation (HEDCOR). The plant acted as both a power source and another income-generating asset of the city as BENECO was also its main client. The power plant however was forced to cease operation in 2015 when the Energy Regulatory Commission issued a cease and desist order to the city due to the lack of a certificate of compliance from the city. The city currently has plans to rehabilitate the power plants so that they could resume operations once again.

== Healthcare ==
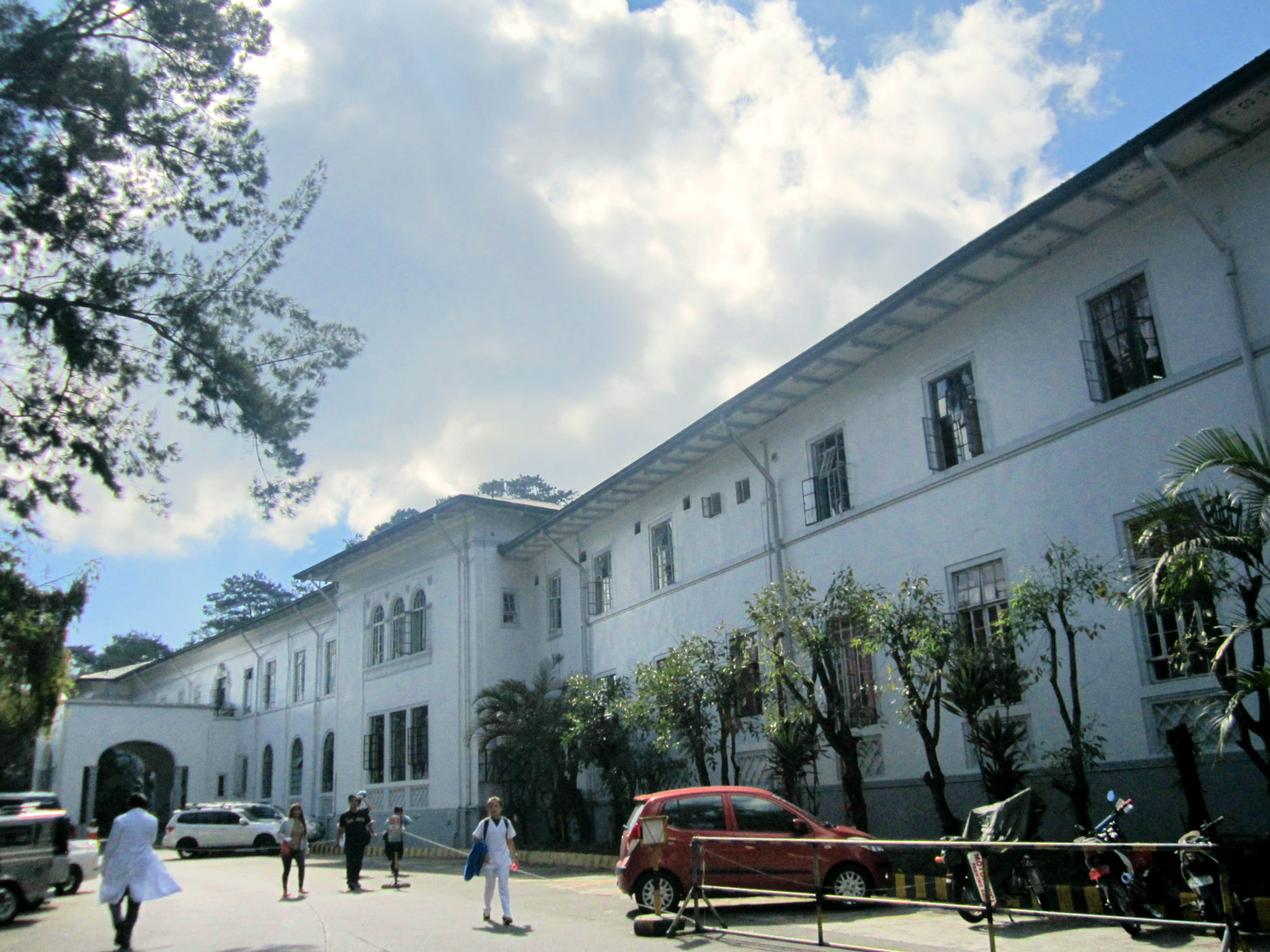
BGHMC, Baguio's sole government hospital

Baguio's healthcare is mainly provided by various private corporations. Private hospitals operating in the city are the Baguio Medical Center, BCU-Santo Niño de Jesus Medical Center Foundation, Parkway Medical Center, Notre Dame de Chartres Hospital, Pines City Doctors' Hospital and Saint Louis University's Hospital of Sacred Heart. The BCU-Santo Niño de Jesus Medical Center Foundation ceased operations in 2009 due to financial reasons but was reopened during the COVID-19 pandemic with the local government refurbishing it as an isolation center for COVID-19 patients. It was eventually idled at the end of the COVID-19 pandemic.

In early 2019, several groups were eyeing to establish a hospital in Barangay Scout Barrio, but was met with opposition; as of March 2019, the project has been shelved.

The Baguio City Health Services Office is the office responsible for the health care programs provided by the city government, operating 16 health centers and 15 satellite clinics. Baguio hosts the Baguio General Hospital and Medical Center or BGHMC, a tertiary state-owned hospital administered and operated by the Department of Health. It is the sole government hospital in the city and the largest government tertiary hospital in the Cordillera Administrative Region.

== Education ==
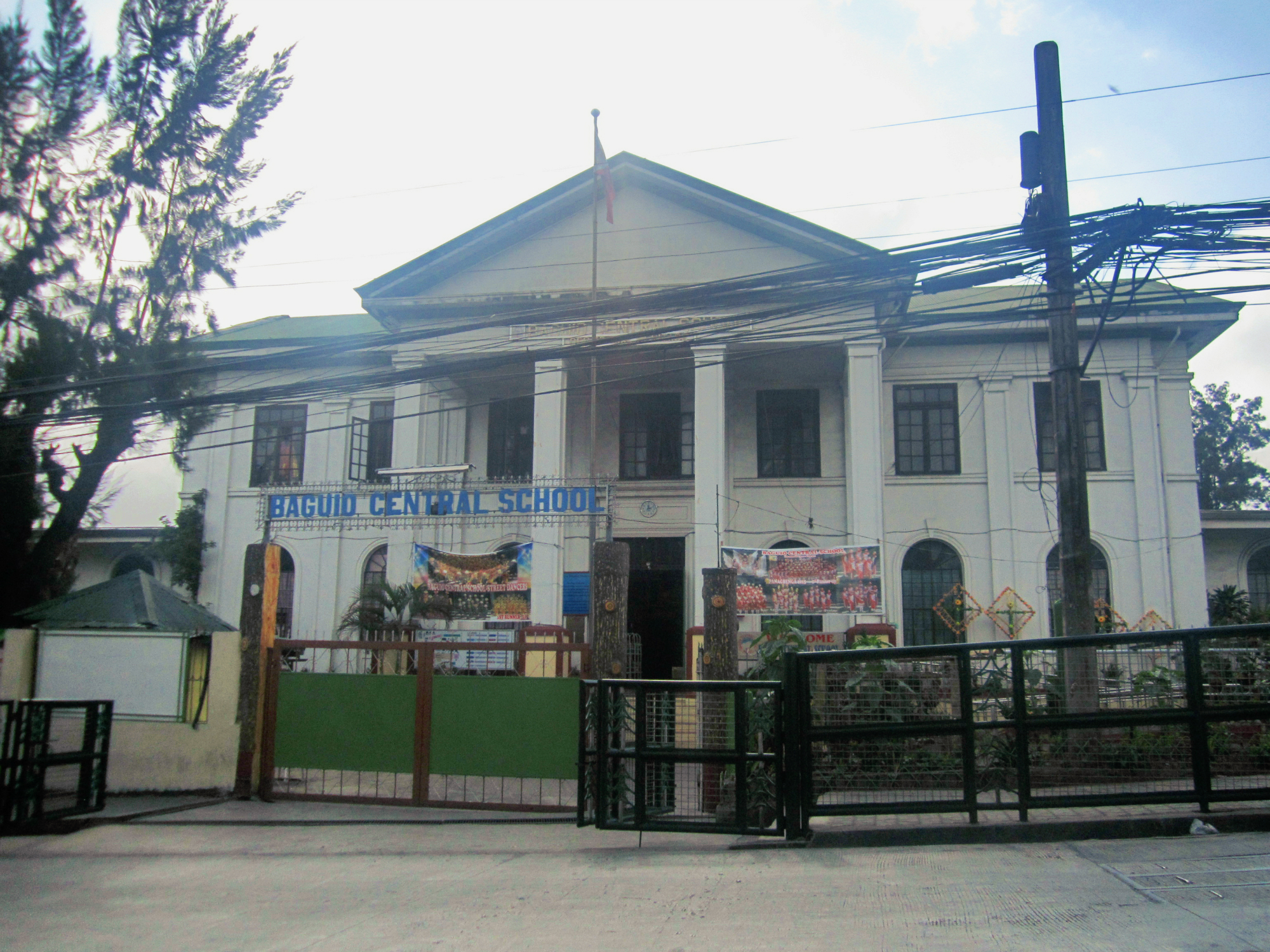
Baguio Central School

Education is a major contributor to the economy of Baguio. Considered as the "Educational Center of the North", the city has a transient student population who migrate to the city to attend tertiary education.

Baguio is the center of education in the Northern Philippines due to high performances in various professional licensure exams as well as adherence to high educational quality standards, housing some of the prestigious and largest universities in Northern Luzon.

=== Elementary and Secondary schools ===
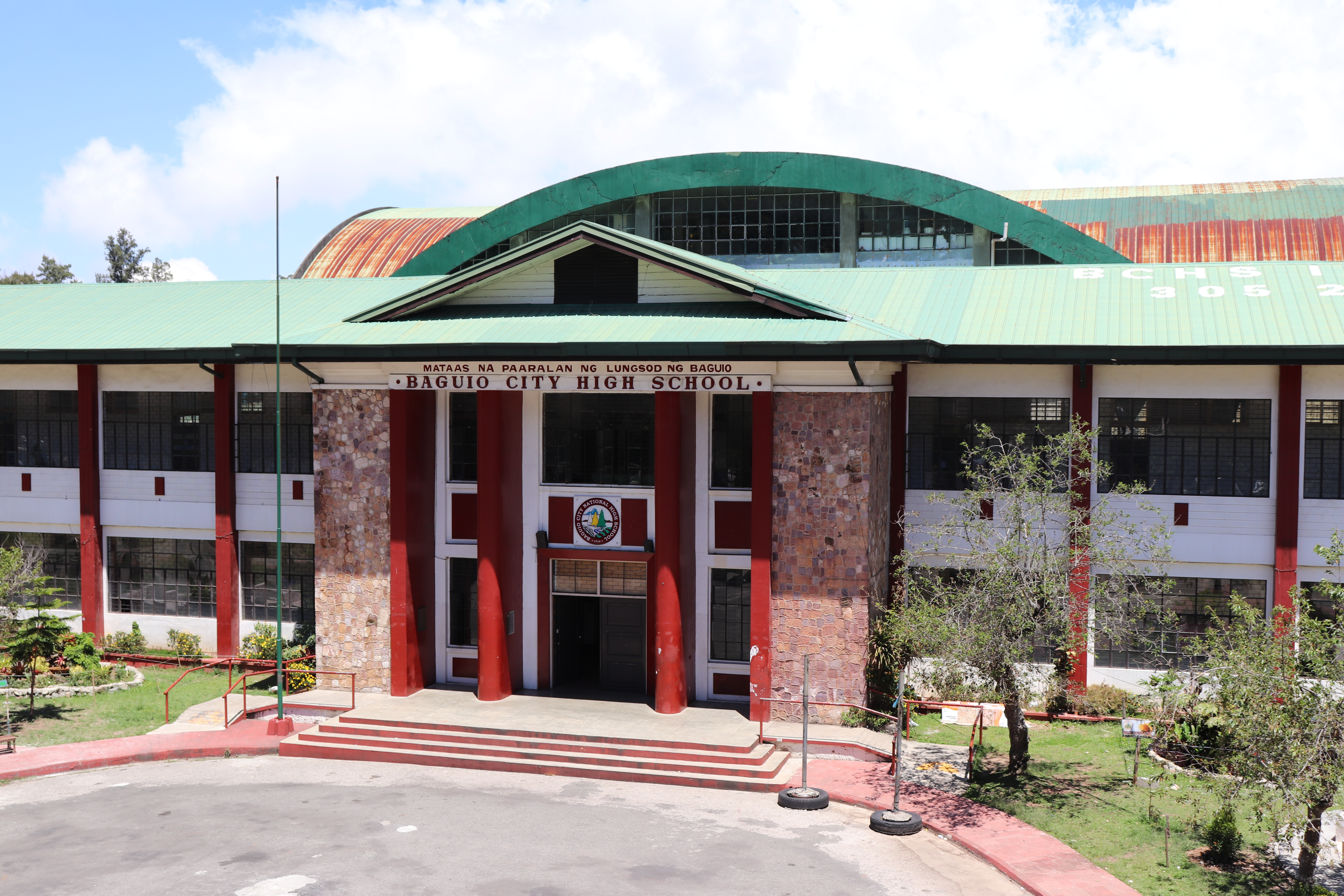
Baguio City High School

The Baguio Schools Division Office governs all educational institutions within the municipality. It oversees the management and operations of all private and public, from primary to secondary schools. There are three schools district offices namely: District I, District II, and District III.

The city has 45 public elementary schools and 21 public secondary schools. Most of its secondary private schools are divisions of the private universities of the city. The Philippine Science High School - CAR campus was established in the city in 2009 and is located in Irisan. In 2016, the city government established in Irisan the Baguio City Science High School to create a unified science high school campus.

Baguio Central School, the country's first public primary school was opened on September 2, 1899. It was once a one-room school built upon Mateo Cariño's 2 hectare lot and Ibaloy house he donated to the local government. Its roof was made of reed and cogongrass with hewn wood walls and floor. Its first students were only 25 Igorot boys, including Dr. Jose Cariño and Maximo Carantes, under a United States Armed Forces teacher, Mr. Patrick. The pupils used slate and chalks to write. In 1901, female students were enrolled. World War II heavily damaged the school which was renovated by the Department of Education in 2004. The Heritage conservation Society declared it as a heritage school. On May 24, 2024, the City Planning, Development, and Sustainability Office stopped the P41.2-million reconstruction project on BCS’ right wing portions of the Gabaldon School Buildings. Under the Cultural Mapping Book, BCS is a “significant tangible and immovable cultural heritage property, and the biggest elementary school in the city, with about 70 classrooms, 3,300 pupils and 83 teaching staff” which ought to be restored to its 1949 state.

=== Higher educational institutions ===
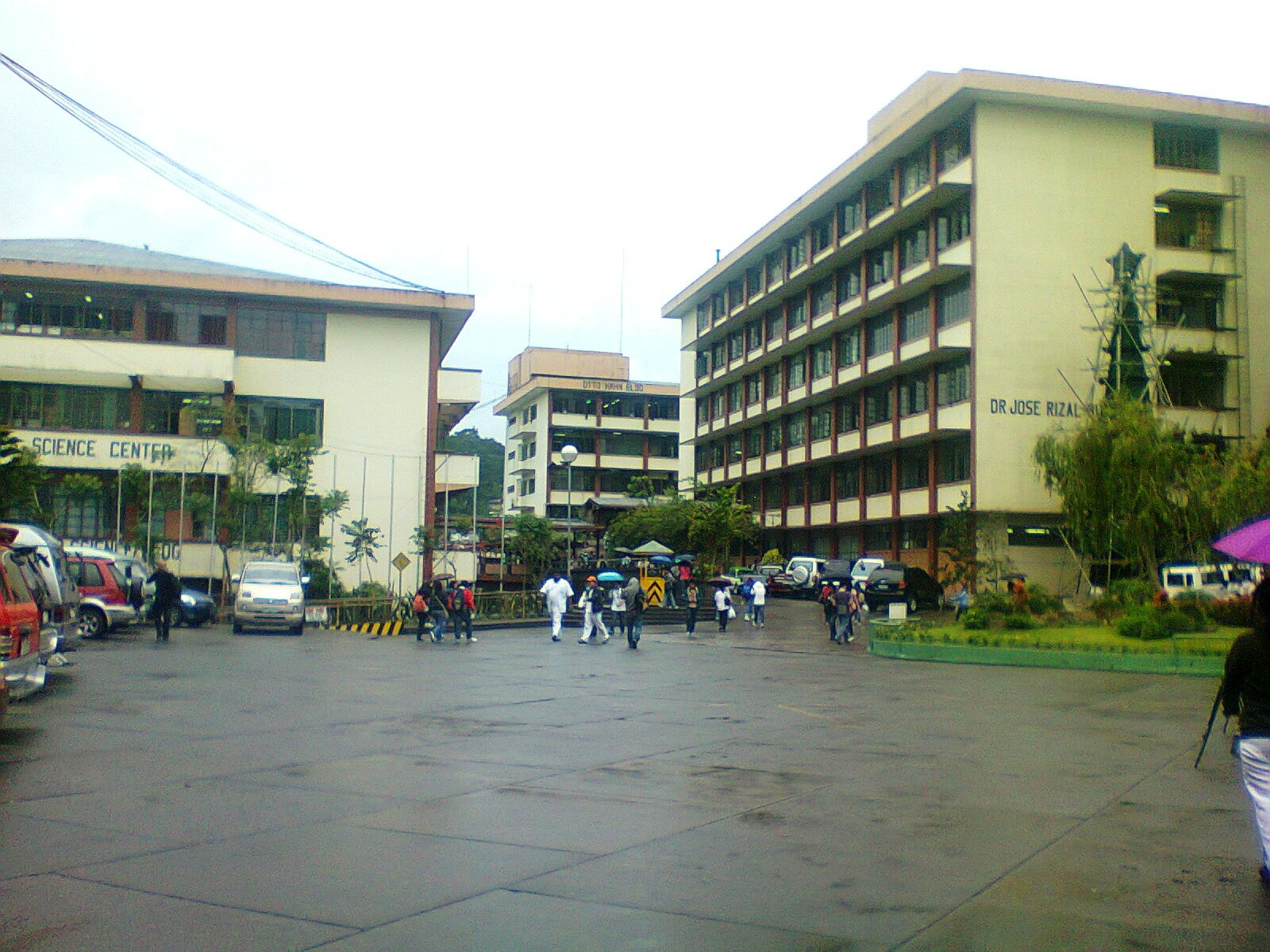
Saint Louis University

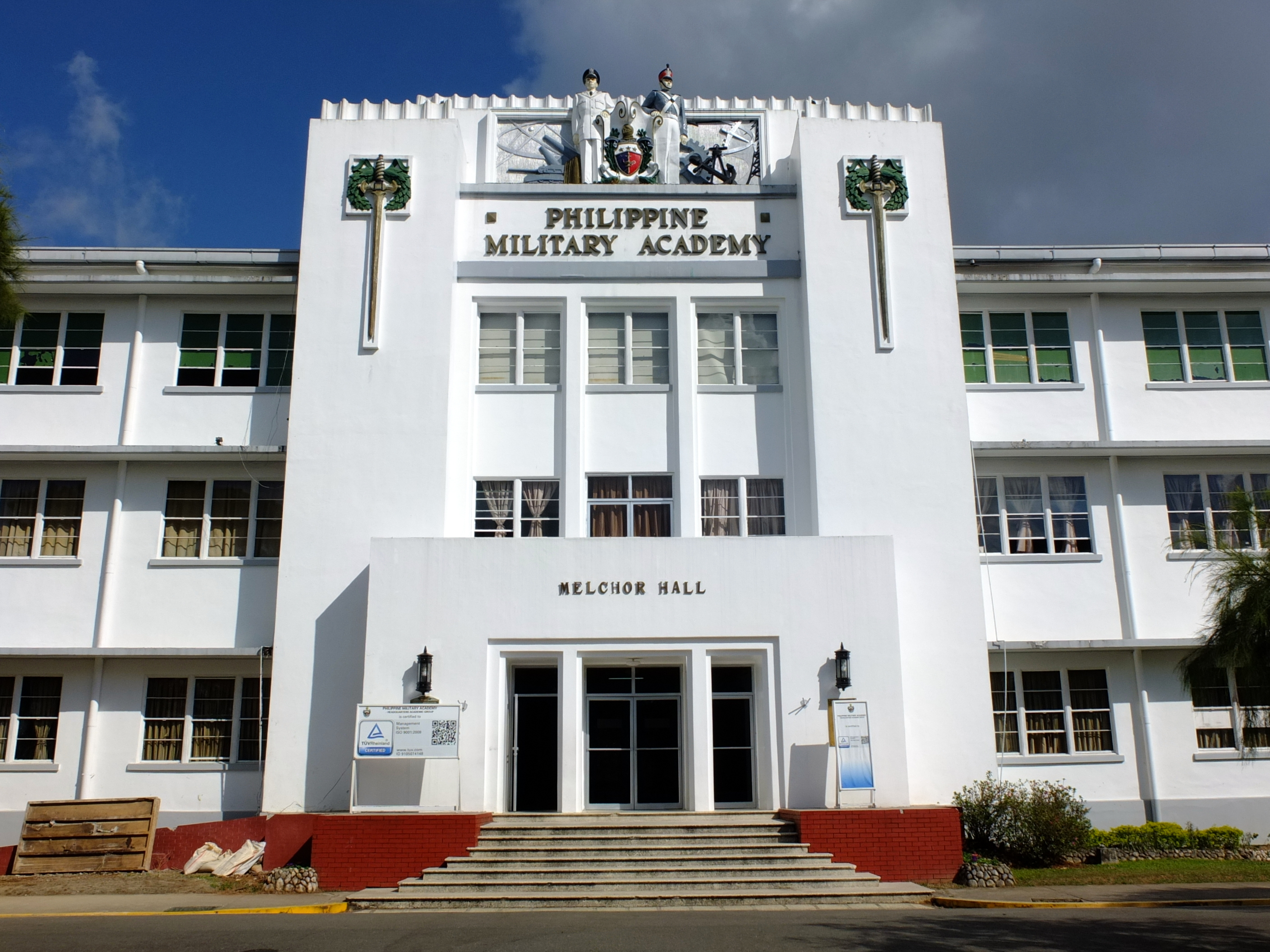
Philippine Military Academy

The city houses eight major institutions of higher education. Baguio's first private school, Easter College, was set up in 1906 by the Rt. Rev. Charles Brent, who was a bishop of the Episcopalian Church.

The University of the Philippines Baguio started as an extension campus of the University of the Philippines in Vigan, Ilocos Sur before transferring to Baguio in 1938. In 1961, it became a branch campus of UP Diliman, before finally becoming UP Baguio in 2002.

Saint Louis University is the largest university in the city and in the north of Manila, catering to over 30,000 students; it was founded by Belgian CICM missionaries in 1911 initially as a one-storey school for boys. It became a college in the 1950s before becoming a university in 1963. It currently has four campuses spread across the city.

Baguio Central University was founded in 1945 as the Centro Academy by the Fernandez family. The following year, another educational institution, the University of the Cordilleras was established as the Baguio Colleges before becoming the Baguio Colleges Foundation; it became a full-fledged university in 2003. The University of Baguio was established as the Baguio Technical and Commercial Institute in 1948 by the Bautista family; it was upgraded to university status in 1969.

Mainly a nursing and medical school, Pines City Colleges was founded in 1969 as the Pines City Doctors Hospital School of Nursing, three years after the opening of Pines City Doctors' Hospital in 1966.

The Philippine Military Academy, the country's military school, was originally founded in the Walled City of Intramuros in 1907 before relocating to Baguio in 1908.

== Twin towns and sister cities ==
=== Local ===
- Angeles City
- Alaminos, Pangasinan
- Bacolod
- Calbayog, Samar
- Candon
- Daet, Camarines Norte
- Davao City
- Dipaculao, Aurora
- Lopez, Quezon
- Lucena
- Makati
- Mandaue
- Marawi, Lanao del Sur
- Muñoz, Nueva Ecija
- Ormoc, Leyte
- Pavia, Iloilo
- San Carlos, Negros Occidental
- Zamboanga City

=== International ===
- Cusco, Peru
- Gongju, South Korea
- Hangzhou, China
- Hanyū, Saitama, Japan
- Honolulu, Hawaii, United States
- Karuizawa, Nagano, Japan
- Nazareth, Israel
- Vaughan, Canada
- Seoul, South Korea
- San Antonio, Texas, United States
- Shepparton, Australia
- Taebaek, South Korea
- Tamuning, Guam, United States
- Taxco, Mexico
- Vallejo, California, United States
- Wakkanai, Hokkaido, Japan

== In popular culture ==
In popular culture, Baguio is frequently featured in Philippine movies.

Movies that are shot in Baguio are the following:

- Citizen Jake
- Don't Give Up on Us (film)
- Kung Mangarap Ka't Magising
- Ping Lacson: Super Cop
- When Magic Hurts

== See also ==
- Capital of the Philippines
- Daniel Burnham
- Hill station
- Kennon Road
- La Trinidad
- Sagada
- Banaue
- Session Road
