= List of Korean Nobel laureates and nominees =

Korean Nobel laureates and nominees

The Nobel Prize medal received by the laureates

As of 2023, the Nobel Prize has been awarded to 975 people and 27 organizations since it was founded in 1901. As of October 2024, two Koreans have become a Nobel laureate: South Korean President Kim Dae-jung and writer Han Kang.

Kim was awarded the 2000 Nobel Peace Prize for his efforts to push for national reconciliation between the divided Koreas during a summit meeting in Pyongyang. One American who was born in South Korea to non-Korean parents, Charles J. Pedersen, won the 1987 Nobel Prize in Chemistry.

Despite only having two Nobel laureates, numerous North and South Korean individuals (both citizens within the country and living in diasporic communities) and organizations have been nominated for the prize in any category.

It was speculated that poor basic science education in school and universities was behind this, and steps were proposed to improve. In 2022, President Yoon Suk-yeol voiced optimism over the future of the field of science in Korea, saying "Korea will have Nobel laureates soon." For comparison, Japan had 32 Nobel laureates in science as of 2026.

== Laureates ==
Year	Image	Laureate	Born	Died	Field	Citation
Citizens
2000		Kim Dae-jung [김대중]	6 January 1924; Hauido, South Jeolla, South Korea	18 August 2009; Seoul, South Korea	Peace	"for his work for democracy and human rights in South Korea and in East Asia in general, and for peace and reconciliation with North Korea in particular."
2024		Han Kang [한강]	27 November 1970; Gwangju, South Korea	—N/a	Literature	"for her intense poetic prose that confronts historical traumas and exposes the fragility of human life."
Diaspora (Note: Nobel laureates of Korean birth and origin but subsequently acquired foreign citizenship.)
1987		Charles J. Pedersen (Note: The 1987 Nobel Prize in Chemistry winner Charles J. Pedersen has a Japanese mother and his Japanese first name was Yoshio (良男). He was born in Busan, Korea, Japanese protectorate, but later moved to Japan with his family at the age of 8 years to attend a convent school in Nagasaki.)	3 October 1904; Busan, South Korea	26 October 1989; Salem, New Jersey, United States	Chemistry	"for their development and use of molecules with structure-specific interactions of high selectivity." (jointly with American chemist Donald J. Cram and French chemist Jean-Marie Lehn)

== Nominations ==
The first Korean to earn a nomination for the Nobel Prize was the poet Yi Gwangsu. Unfortunately he died in 1950, therefore his nomination was done posthumously and, according to the Nobel statutes, posthumous nominations are automatically disqualified during the committee's deliberations. Only living individuals and existing organizations are permitted to be nominated. Since then, other Koreans began getting nominated for the prestigious Swedish prize in different categories. The following list are the nominees with verified nominations from the Nobel Committee and recognized international organizations. There are also other purported nominees whose nominations are yet to be verified since the archives are revealed 50 years after, among them:

- For Physics: Benjamin W. Lee (1935–1977), Moo-Young Han (1934–2016), Jisoon Ihm (born 1954), Noh Tae-won (born 1957) and Philip Kim (born 1967).
- For Chemistry: Yoon Nung-min (1927–2009), Kim Kimoon (born 1954), Ryoo Ryong (Note: Ryoo Ryong was named 2014 Clarivate Citation Laureate with Charles T. Kresge and Galen D. Stucky "for the design of functional mesoporous materials.") (born 1955), Nam-Gyu Park (Note: Nam-Gyu Park was named 2017 Clarivate Citation Laureate with Tsutomu Miyasaka and Henry Snaith "for their discovery and application of perovskite materials to achieve efficient energy conversion.") (born 1960), Hyeon Taeghwan (Note: Taeghwan Hyeon was named 2020 Clarivate Citation Laureate with Christopher B. Murray and Moungi G. Bawendi "for synthesis of nanocrystals with precise attributes for a wide range of applications in physical, biological, and medical systems.") (born 1964) and YoungSoo Kim (born 1978).
- For Physiology or Medicine: Ho Wang Lee (Note: Ho Wang Lee was named 2021 Clarivate Citation Laureate with Karl Johnson "for identification and isolation of the Hantaan virus (hantavirus), agent of hemorrhagic fever with renal syndrome.") (1928–2022), Yu Myeong-Hee (born 1954), V. Narry Kim (born 1969) and Charles Lee (Note: Charles Lee was named 2014 Clarivate Citation Laureate with Stephen W. Scherer and Michael H. Wigler "for their contributions to the discovery of large-scale copy number variation and its association with specific diseases.") (born 1969).
- For Literature: Kim Dongni (1913–1995), Hwang Sun-won (1915–2000), Seo Jeong-ju (1915–2000), Ku Sang (1919–2004), Pak Kyongni (1926–2008), Park Wan-suh (1931–2011), Choe Inhun (1936–2018), Ko Un (born 1933), Claudia Lee Hae-in (born 1933), Hwang Sok-yong (born 1943), Yi Munyeol (born 1948), Kim Hyesoon (born 1955), Yi Seungu (born 1959), Shin Kyung-sook (born 1963) and Kim Young-ha (born 1968).
- For Peace: Chang Chun-ha (1918–1975), Kim Yong-ki (1908–1988), Chang Kee-ryo (1911–1995), Lee Tai-young (1914–1998), Lee Jong-wook (1945–2006), Archbp. Stephen Kim Sou-hwan (1922–2009), Park Won-soon (1955–2020), Han Seung-soo (born 1936), Ban Ki-moon (born 1944), John Woong-Jin Oh (born 1944), Kim Jong-ki (born 1947), Moon Jae-in (born 1953), Pomnyun Sunim (born 1953), Kitack Lim (born 1956), and Kim Jong Un (born 1984).
- For Economics: Hyun-Song Shin (born 1959) and Ha-Joon Chang (born 1963).

=== Nominees ===
Picture	Name (Note: The (*) asterisks on the name denote the nominees were expatriates who resided or died in Korea.)	Born	Died	Years Nominated	Notes
Physiology or Medicine
	Bun-ichi Hasama [挾間 文一] (Note: According to the Nobel nomination archives, Bun-ichi Hasama was a professor of pharmacology at the Keijō Imperial University. In 1938, he was jointly nominated with German physiologist Erich von Holst (1908–1962) and Russian biologist Alexander Gurwitsch (1874–1954).)	1898; Ōita, Japan	1946	1938	Nominated by Albrecht Bethe (1872–1954).
Literature
	Yi Gwangsu [이광수] (posthumously nominated)	1 February 1892; Chongju, North Pyongan, North Korea	25 October 1950; Manpo, Chagang, North Korea	1970	Nominated by Baek Cheol (1908–1985).
	Younghill Kang [강용흘]	5 June 1898; Hongwon, South Hamgyong, North Korea	2 December 1972; Satellite Beach, Florida, United States	1971	Nominated by Robert Payne (1911–1983).
	Eun Kook Kim [김은국]	13 March 1932; Hamhung, South Hamgyong, North Korea	23 June 2009; Shutesbury, Massachusetts, United States	1971	Nominated by Baek Cheol (1908–1985).
	Pak Tu-jin [박두진]	10 March 1916; Anseong, Gyeonggi, South Korea	16 September 1998; Seoul, South Korea	1972	Nominated by Baek Cheol (1908–1985).
	Kim Chi-ha [김지하]	4 February 1941; Mokpo, South Jeolla, South Korea	8 May 2022; Wonju, Gangwon, South Korea	1976	
	Seo Jeong-ju [서정주]	18 May 1915; Gochang, North Jeolla, South Korea	24 December 2000; Seoul, South Korea	1978, 1983, 1985, 1988, 1995	
	Kim Dongni [김동리]	24 November 1913; Gyeongju, North Gyeongsang, South Korea	17 June 1995; Seoul, South Korea	1985	
	Ko Un [고은]	1 August 1933; Gunsan, North Jeolla, South Korea	(aged 96)	2001, 2002, 2003, 2005, 2006, 2007, 2008, 2009, 2010, 2012, 2013, 2014, 2015, 2016, 2017, 2019, 2020, 2021, 2022, 2023, 2024, 2025	
	O Jeonghui [오정희]	9 November 1947; Seoul, South Korea	(aged 78)	2013, 2014, 2015	
	Mun Jeonghui [문정희]	25 May 1947; Boseong, South Jeolla, South Korea	(aged 79)	2016, 2017, 2020, 2021, 2023	
	Kim Hyesoon [김혜순]	26 October 1955; Uljin, North Gyeongsang, South Korea	(aged 71)	2016, 2017, 2019, 2020, 2021, 2022, 2023, 2024	
	Choi Seung-ja [최승자]	1952; Sejong City, South Korea	(aged 74)	2021	
	Lee Hae-in [이해인]	7 June 1945; Yanggu, Gangwon, South Korea	(aged 81)	2022, 2026	
	Han Kang [한강]	27 November 1970; Gwangju, South Korea	(aged 55)	2023, 2024	Awarded the 2024 Nobel Prize in Literature.
	Bae Suah [배수아]	1965; Seoul, South Korea	(aged 61)	2024	
Peace
	Ham Seok-heon [함석헌]	13 March 1901; Yomju, North Pyongan, North Korea	4 February 1989; Seoul, South Korea	1979, 1985	
	Kim Dae-jung [김대중]	6 January 1924; Hauido, South Jeolla, South Korea	18 August 2009; Seoul, South Korea	1987, 1999, 2000	Awarded the 2000 Nobel Peace Prize.
	Moon Ik-hwan [문익환]	2 June 1918; Longjing, Jilin, China	18 January 1994; Fukuoka, Japan	1992	
	Sun Myung Moon [문선명]	6 January 1920; Chongju, North Pyongan, North Korea	3 September 2012; Gapyeong, Gyeonggi, South Korea	2002	
	Yoon Geum-soon [윤금순]	1 October 1959; South Korea	(aged 67)	2005	Nominated jointly by Ruth-Gaby Vermot-Mangold (1941–) as part of the 1000 PeaceWomen Across the Globe.
	Shin Heisoo [신희수]	23 June 1950; Gyeonggi, South Korea	(aged 76)	2005	Nominated jointly by Ruth-Gaby Vermot-Mangold (1941–) as part of the 1000 PeaceWomen Across the Globe.
	Lee Hyun-Sook [이현숙]	1958; South Korea	(aged 68)	2005	Nominated jointly by Ruth-Gaby Vermot-Mangold (1941–) as part of the 1000 PeaceWomen Across the Globe.
	Maria Rhie Chol-soon [이철순]	South Korea	—N/a	2005	Nominated jointly by Ruth-Gaby Vermot-Mangold (1941–) as part of the 1000 PeaceWomen Across the Globe.
	Kim Sook-Im [김숙임]	South Korea	—N/a	2005	Nominated jointly by Ruth-Gaby Vermot-Mangold (1941–) as part of the 1000 PeaceWomen Across the Globe.
	Jeong Yu-Jin [정유진]	27 July 1977; South Korea	(aged 49)	2005	Nominated jointly by Ruth-Gaby Vermot-Mangold (1941–) as part of the 1000 PeaceWomen Across the Globe.
	Song Sin-do [송신도]	24 November 1922; Chūseinan, South Korea	16 December 2017; Tokyo, Japan	2005	Nominated jointly by Ruth-Gaby Vermot-Mangold (1941–) as part of the 1000 PeaceWomen Across the Globe.
	Ban Ki-moon [반기문]	13 June 1944; Eumseong, North Chungcheong, South Korea	(aged 82)	2014	8th Secretary-General of the United Nations (2007–2016)
	Marianne Stöger [고지선]	24 April 1934; Matrei am Brenner, Tyrol, Austria	(aged 92)	2017, 2020	
	Margaritha Pissarek [백수선]	9 June 1935; Austria	29 September 2023; Innsbruck, Tyrol, Austria	2017, 2020	
	Hak Ja Han [한학자]	10 February 1943; Anju, South Pyongan, North Korea	(aged 83)	2026	Nominated by Ján Figeľ (1960–).
	People of South Korea	Korea		2026	

=== Nominators ===
The following Korean individuals became qualified nominators of local and foreign contenders for the Nobel Prize in any category:

Image	Nominator	Born	Died	Nominee	Motivation	Year Nominated
Literature
	Baek Cheol [백철]	18 March 1908; Uiju, North Pyongan, North Korea	13 October 1985; Seoul, South Korea	Yi Gwangsu (1892–1950); North Korea	It Is Love (1909); Heartless (1917); Danjong Aesa (1929); Soil (1932)	1970
	Baek Cheol [백철]	18 March 1908; Uiju, North Pyongan, North Korea	13 October 1985; Seoul, South Korea	Eun Kook Kim (1932–2009); United States	The Martyred (1964); The Innocent (1968); Lost Names (1970); In Search of Lost Years (1985)	1971
	Baek Cheol [백철]	18 March 1908; Uiju, North Pyongan, North Korea	13 October 1985; Seoul, South Korea	Pak Tu-jin (1916–1998); South Korea	The Sun (1949); A Prayer at Noon (1953); A Human Jungle (1963); Chronicles of Water and Stone (1973)	1972
Peace
	Mun Hui-sok	—N/a	1977; South Korea	Universal Esperanto Association (founded in 1908); Netherlands	"for their contribution to eliminating misunderstandings, suspicion and hatred amongst nations through the international language Esperanto."	1962
	Rhee Hyo-sang [이효상]	14 January 1906; Jung, Daegu, North Gyeongsang, South Korea	18 June 1989; Seoul, South Korea	Hermann Gmeiner (1919–1986); Austria	"for founding SOS Children's Villages, and through his work gathering millions of people in the cause of good will for abandoned children."	1965
	Hi Sup Chung [정희섭]	1 February 1920; Pyongwon, South Pyongan, North Korea	26 October 1987; Uiwang, Gyeonggi, South Korea	Spurgeon Milton Keeney (1893–1988); United States	"for having, throughout his life, strived for freedom of the individual and full development of human beings as persons and for continuously striving for human betterment, for the dignity of the individual and for the coming together of all people."	1969
	Lee Hai-rang [이해랑]	22 July 1916; Seoul, South Korea	8 April 1989; Seoul, South Korea	Pearl S. Buck (1892–1973); United States		1972
	Kim Jong-pil [김종필]	7 January 1926; South Chungcheong, South Korea	23 June 2018; Seoul, South Korea	Pearl S. Buck (1892–1973); United States		1972
	Kim Hwang-sik [김황식]	9 August 1948; Jangseong, South Jeolla, South Korea		Marianne Stöger (born 1934); Austria	"for their four decades of work on Sorok Island, looking after Hansen's disease patients with all their hearts."	2020
	Kim Hwang-sik [김황식]	9 August 1948; Jangseong, South Jeolla, South Korea		Margaritha Pissarek (1935–2023); Austria	"for their four decades of work on Sorok Island, looking after Hansen's disease patients with all their hearts."	2020
