= List of people from Baguio =

This is a list of notable inhabitants of Baguio, Luzon, Philippines.

== Arts ==
- Benedicto Cabrera aka Bencab, painter, National Artist for Visual Arts.
- Bert Nievera, singer
- Kidlat Tahimik, filmmaker, writer and actor who is dubbed the Father of Philippine Alternative Cinema and now National Artist for Film
- Ben Hur Villanueva, sculptor, painter, lecturer, educator and art entrepreneur.
- Agnes Reoma, musician, bassist of Ben&Ben.

== Athletics ==
- Roberto Cruz, former Filipino professional boxer who won the WBA World Light Welterweight title
- Eduard Folayang, Filipino professional mixed martial artist and wushu practitioner, Current ONE Lightweight World Champion and well decorated MMA-Wushu fighter.
- Kevin Belingon, a Filipino mixed martial artist and former ONE Championship Bantamweight Champion.
- Geje "Gravity" Eustaquio, a Filipino Professional Mixed Martial Artist and former ONE Championship Flyweight Champion.
- Joshua "The Passion" Pacio, a Filipino Professional Mixed Martial Artist and former ONE Championship Straw weight Champion.
- Douglas Rimorin "Doug" Kramer. Professional Basketball Player, youtuber, Social Media personality.

== Media personalities ==
- Llyan Oliver Austria, architect and YouTube content creator.
- Paulo Avelino, actor, model, host and singer
- Iana Bernardez, actress, film producer
- Roxanne Baeyens professionally known as Roxie Smith, Miss Philippines Earth 2020 and Miss Earth Water 2020
- Ces Drilon, farmer; retired ABS-CBN journalist
- Van Ferro, American actor, was born in Baguio
- Richard Heydarian, Filipino political scientist and podcaster
- Marc Logan, journalist newscast comedian and narrator
- John Medina, actor
- Rocco Nacino, actor, model, host
- Neri Naig-Miranda, Filipina actress, 6th Runner-up Star Circle Quest.
- Robin Padilla, Filipino film actor, screenwriter, producer and director, current Senator.
- Bernadette Sembrano, a Filipina reporter, news presenter, and television host.
- Kylie Verzosa, Binibining Pilipinas International 2016 and Miss International 2016
- Gian Bernardino, lead singer of the band Cup of Joe.

== Public service ==
- Camilo Cascolan, Chief of the Philippine National Police.
- Marvic Leonen, Associate Justice of the Supreme Court of the Philippines.
- Benjamin Magalong, Mayor of Baguio and retired police officer.
- Marquez "Mark" O. Go, Representative Lone District of Baguio.
- Romeo Brawner Jr., Head Army General Servant of Armed Forces of The Philippines

== American colonial period ==
- Henry Tureman Allen, a military officer who organized the Philippine Constabulary and namesake of Camp Henry T. Allen, the first home of the Philippine Military Academy
- Robert Baden Powell, British founder of the Scouting Movement and namesake of the Baden-Powell Building, the former headquarters for Boy Scouts of the Philippines and meeting place for the First Philippine Commission
- Charles Henry Brent, Episcopal Missionary Bishop and founder of the Brent International School
- Daniel Burnham, the urban planner and architect responsible for the initial design of the city and namesake of Burnham Park
- William Cameron Forbes, American Governor-General of the Philippines who ordered Kennon Road to be built
- Eusebius Julius Halsema, American Civil Engineer and mayor of Baguio from 1922 to 1937; namesake of Halsema Highway
- Francis Burton Harrison, governor general for whom Harrison Road was named
- John Hay, United States Secretary of State and namesake of Camp John Hay
- Melvin Jones, founder of the Lions Club and namesake of Jones Grandstand in Burnham Park
- Joseph J. Keith, Long serving police chief (1912–1941) who declared Baguio an open city on December 8, 1941 in face of the Japanese bombardment
- Lyman W.V. Kennon, builder and namesake for Kennon Road
- George A. Malcolm, American jurist establishing the U.P. College of Law and namesake of Malcolm Square in the city center
- William F. Pack, governor of Benguet province who planned the creation of Teacher's Camp and namesake of Governor Pack Road
- Robb White, (1909–1990) American writer of screenplays, television scripts, and adventure novels
- Leonard Wood, American military officer and Governor-General from 1921 to 1927 for whom Leonard Wood Road was named
- Dean Conant Worcester, Member of First Philippine Commission and government official urging founding of Baguio as the "Summer Capital"

== Literature ==
- Luisa Igloria (born 1961), poet, 20th Poet Laureate of Virginia, author and professor

== Others ==
- Maria Lorena Barros (1948–1976), activist, feminist, Anti-Martial Law hero.
- Joan Carling (born 1963), environmentalist and human rights defender.
- Naomi Flores (1921–2013), resistance leader in World War II.
- Sinai Hamada (1911 – September 1991), founder of Baguio Midland Courier.
- Darwin Ramos (1994–2012), Servant of God, Filipino teenager.
- Stephen Loman (born 1999), fighter mixed martial artist.
- Theresia Unno FMM (1911 – 1989), founder of the Filipino-Japanese Foundation of Northern Luzon.

== See also ==
- List of people from Benguet
