= Baguio (disambiguation) =

Baguio is a highly-urbanized city in the Philippines.

Baguio may also refer to:

- Baguio Airport, an airport in Baguio, Philippines
  - Legislative district of Baguio, representation of Baguio in various legislatures
    - Baguio's at-large congressional district, representation of Baguio in the House of Representatives
- Baguio Cathedral, a Roman Catholic church in Baguio, Philippines
- Baguio District, in Davao City, Philippines
- Metro Baguio, an agglomeration of the city of Baguio and five municipalities of Benguet in the Philippines
- University of Baguio, a university in Baguio, Philippines

== People with the name ==
- Baguio Wong, table tennis player from Hong Kong
- Cyrus Baguio (born 1980), Filipino professional basketball player

== See also ==
- Bagyo, typhoons in the Philippines
- Baguio Beans, the Filipino term for green beans
- Baguio Midland Courier, a defunct newspaper in Baguio, Philippines
- Baguio Villa, a housing estate in Hong Kong
