= Masasue Suho =

Japanese physician

Masasue Suō
- Born: October 8, 1885; Shiga Prefecture
- Died: June 20, 1942 (aged 56); Sorok Sanatorium, Korea
- Occupations: Physician and Director of Sorok Island Sanatorium, a leper hospital.
- Known for: Enlargement of the Sorok Island Sanatorium in Korea to a capacity of 6000 in-patients. He was stabbed to death by a patient.

Masasue Suō (周防 正季, Suō Masasue; October 8, 1885 – June 20, 1942) was a Japanese physician, the director of the Sorok Island Sanatorium in Korea. He completed the world's biggest leprosy facility, Sorok Island Sanatorium, hospitalizing 6000 patients. He was assassinated by a patient while rushing to a morning ceremony. Forced segregation of leprosy patients, inhumane treatments towards patients, and antipathy against colonial rule were behind the assassination.

== Life ==
=== In Japan ===
He was born in Shiga Prefecture on October 8, 1885. After attending the Aichi Prefectural Medical College (Now Nagoya University) and becoming a physician, he worked at various institutions. He studied the art of architecture at a night school.

=== In Korea ===
In 1921, he went to Korea and became the health section chief of the police, and was engaged in the treatment of narcotic patients. He studied at the Keijyo Imperial UniversitySeoul University and received the Ph.D. with papers on the effects of morphine on rabbit intestines from Kyoto Imperial University Kyoto University. In 1926 and 1927 he travelled around the world inspecting health conditions.

== Leprosy control in Korea under Japanese occupation ==
There were about 15,000-20,000 leprosy patients chiefly in the southern parts of Korean Peninsula. There were 3 sanatoriums run by foreigners at the time of annexation (1910). In 1916, the Japanese Government established a hospital in Sorok Island and hospitalized 100 patients. In 1933, Suho became the director and started to establish a big sanatorium. He himself worked with the planning, buying of construction materials and construction works. He forced the patients to work in the construction. He also made a statue of himself in the island and forced the patients to worship the statue. Forced segregation of leprosy patients was conducted with the help of some Korean bosses in Korea; in Japan proper, patients were hospitalized in tens of patients, but in Korea, it was in hundreds of patients at times.

== The 14th Congress of the Japanese Leprosy Association ==
In 1940, the 14th Congress of the Japanese Leprosy Association was held under Suho's presidency. Kensuke Mitsuda, Kiyoshi Shiga, Tadao Toda, Matsuki Miyazaki and other noted scholars attended the congress.

== Death ==
On the morning of June 20, 1942, while he was walking to a morning ceremony, he was stabbed to death by a Korean patient. There were records of TV interviews in 1997 by TBS Japan:

"A man standing near me concealed his hands under clothes, it was summer and hot. He grasped the neck of Suho and stabbed him with bandaged hands. We were horrified thinking we would be killed.

"For the building of his statue, we had to pay. We were forced to pay tribute to Shinto Shrine (Japanese custom). There were some who resisted and said that we could not do, because we were Christians. Some of them died in a prison."

"Suho was an able administrator. He stored much food, and made agricultural machines available. However, I received an operation of sterilization. It was a cruel surgery. I would have been committed suicide, if I were not a Christian."
