= Poet Midang Memorial Hall =

Coordinates: 35.5357°N 126.6101°E

- 미당시문학관
- Established: 2001
- Location: Gochang, South Korea
- Type: Literary Museum
- Website: www.gochang.go.kr/seojungju/

- Poet Midang Memorial Hall
- Hangul: 미당시문학관
- Hanja: 未堂詩文學館
- Revised Romanization: Midang si munhakgwan
- McCune–Reischauer: Midang si munhakkwan

Poet Midang Memorial Hall (a.k.a. Midang Literary House) is a memorial hall built in Seonun-ri, Buan-myeon, Gochang-gun, Jeollabuk-do. It was opened in the fall of 2001 with the backing of the Gochang county governor. It was newly remodeled from a closed elementary school (Seonun Branch School of Bongam Elementary School). Seo Jeong-ju's birthplace and tomb complex are nearby.

== See also ==
- Midang Literary Award
