= Honorary Citizen of South Korea =

Symbolic honor of South Korea

Honorary citizen (Korean: 명예국민; Hanja: 名譽國民; RR: Myeongye gungmin) is an honor bestowed by South Korea's Minister of Justice on foreigners of exceptional merit. It is a symbolic honor; the recipient does not take the Oath of Citizenship and thus does not receive any rights, privileges, or duties typically held by a citizen of South Korea.

It is not to be confused with special naturalisation (특별귀화; 特別歸化; teukbyeol gwihwa) under Article 7 of the Nationality Act, under which the recipient actually becomes a citizen of South Korea. Such special naturalisation has for example been granted by the Minister of Justice to Martine Prost for her contribution on returning les manuscrits coréens from France.

The regulations governing grants of honorary citizenship are found in Article 22 of the Nationality Administrative Processing Directions. Paragraph 1 provides the criteria: foreigners may be granted honorary citizenship if they have received an order, decoration, or medal from the South Korean government; in recognition of contributions in the fields of security, society, economy, or the arts; or for other contribution at a level similar to the two previously mentioned. Paragraph 3 provides that an honorary citizen of South Korea can enjoy special immigration privileges under ordinances from the Minister of Justice.

== List ==
As of June 2018, four people have been granted honorary citizenship of South Korea.

#	Name	Nationality	Award date	Information
1	Guus Hiddink (born 1946)	Netherlands	2 July 2002	South Korea national football team head coach who first led the team to a semi-final of the FIFA World Cup.
2	Marianne Stöger (born 1934)	Austria	8 June 2016	Austrian nun who worked as a nurse at the leper colony on Sorokdo, South Jeolla Province from 1962 to 2005.
3	Margaritha Pissarek (1935–2023)	Austria	8 June 2016	Austrian nun who worked as a nurse at the leper colony on Sorokdo, South Jeolla Province from 1966 to 2005.
4	Patrick James McGlinchey (1928–2018)	Ireland	5 June 2018	Irish Catholic missionary who settled in Jeju and contributed to agriculture there. Awarded posthumously.
