= Kathleen Okubo =

Filipino journalist (1953–2024)

- Born: March 25, 1953
- Died: April 7, 2024 (aged 71)
- Occupations: Journalist, activist, columnist, writer

Kathleen Okubo (March 25, 1953 – April 7, 2024) was a Filipino journalist, activist, columnist, dissident and writer based in Baguio.

== Early life ==
Kathleen Okubo was born to Bernardo Okubo on March 25, 1953. She was a nephew of Yoshinai "Sinai" Hamada, who founded the Baguio Midland Courier, where she first worked as a journalist in 1964. She was of Ibaloi descent.

== Journalism ==
During the martial law era, Okubo was an activist of the underground communist Kabataang Makabayan and was arrested in Pangasinan in 1973 for organizing youth and students while contributing stories for local newspapers under a pseudonym. She was later released but was required to report regularly to Philippine Constabulary headquarters in Camp Bado Dangwa in La Trinidad, Benguet. Despite this, she maintained her career as a journalist, eventually helping to establish several other news outlets covering northern Luzon such as the Cordillera News Agency and Cordillera News and Features (CNF).

After the end of martial law, Okubo faced threats from authorities and the Cordillera People's Liberation Army who accused her of subversion and supporting the CPP-NPA for her reporting on human rights violations and other abuses in the Cordillera Administrative Region, which led to her being imprisoned twice during the 1990s. Despite this, she continued to report critically on such matters and advocated for press freedom by helping to establish a joint chapter of the National Union of Journalists of the Philippines in Baguio-Benguet as well as in Ilocos Sur.

In 1989, Okubo founded Northern Dispatch as a mimeographed dispatch, which she eventually led to become a full-pledged community paper in 2002. She later served as its editor-in-chief until her retirement in 2019, but continued to work for the paper as a contributor and editorial consultant until 2022.

== Death ==
Okubo died after suffering several illnesses on April 7, 2024, at the age of 71. Her remains were cremated on April 12.

== Selected awards ==
- Distinguished Gintong Tala Luminary Award in Journalism by the National Correspondents Club of Baguio (2018)
