= Musong Yu clan =

Korean clan from North Jeolla Province

- Country: Korea
- Current region: Gochang County
- Founder: Yu Geum pil

Musong Yu clan (Korean: 무송 유씨; Hanja: 茂松 庾氏) is one of the Korean clans in both North and South Korea. Their Bon-gwan is in Gochang County, North Jeolla Province. According to household researches held in 2000, the number of Musong Yu amounted to 12,464 individuals. The Yu clan traces back their lineage to the Pyeongsan Yu Clan, a prominent clan of Goguryeo origins during the Later Three Kingdoms of Korea and the Early-mid era of Goryeo. Their founder was Yu Geum pil who is known to be one of the most famous generals during the Goryeo Dynasty in his role of supporting Taejo of Goryeo and making an achievement in unifying of the Three Koreas by crushing the Later Baekje armies led by Gyeon Hwon. According to legends, his ancestor was Yu Sun-yoo, who was said to be a naturalized immigrant from Eastern Jin that settled in Goguryeo during the 4th century because he fell in love with the sight of nature in Korea. However, like all other Korean clans that claim false Chinese ancestry, this is likely to be false.

== See also ==
- Korean clan names of foreign origin
