= Margaritha Pissarek =

Austrian nurse in South Korea (1935–2023)

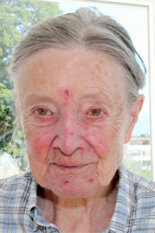
Margaritha Pissarek, 2020

Margaritha Pissarek (1935–2023) was an Austrian nun who worked as a nurse at the leper colony on Sorokdo, South Jeolla Province, South Korea, from 1966 to 2005. She is an Honorary Citizen of South Korea and a Nobel nominee from South Korea.

In 1962, two Catholic Austrian nurses, Margaritha Pissarek and Marianne Stoeger, arrived at Sorokdo to provide treatment for patients and help establish community facilities, such as childcare centers.
