= Saint Louis University (Philippines) =

Roman Catholic university in Baguio, Philippines

- Pamantasan ng San Luis (Filipino)
- Latin: Ūniversitās Sānctī Aloysii
- Other name: SLU
- Former names: St. Louis School (1911‑1952); St. Louis College (1952‑1963)
- Motto: Sapientia Aedificat (Latin)
- Motto in English: Wisdom Builds
- Type: Private Catholic Research Non-profit Coeducational; Basic and Higher Educational institution
- Established: December 1, 1911 (114 years and 257 days)
- Founders: Fr. Seraphin Devesse, CICM
- Religious affiliation: Roman Catholic (CICM Missionaries)
- Academic affiliations: ASAIHL; IAUP; IFCU; UMAP; PAASCU; ACUP; ASEACCU; CEAP; PACU
- President: Fr. Gilbert B. Sales, CICM
- Vice-president: List: Fr. Emery Mwako Ebumea, CICM Mission and Identity; Atty. Shellah Yzanne P. Merced Administration; Dr. Felina P. Espique Academic Affairs; Dr. Roberto M. Arguelles Finance
- Principal: Alejandro P. Pablico; Basic Education School
- Faculty: 700+
- Students: 40,000+ (elementary, secondary, and tertiary)
- Location: A. Bonifacio Street, Baguio, Benguet, Philippines; 16°25′06″N 120°35′52″E
- Campus: Urban - Total 4 campuses 24 hectares (240,000 m^{2}) Main; Mount Mary Campus 6 hectares (60,000 m^{2}), A. Bonifacio St. Baguio Satellite; Gonzaga Campus 5 hectares (50,000 m^{2}) Gen. Luna St., Baguio; Navy Base Campus 5 hectares (50,000 m^{2}) Navy Base, St. Joseph Village Baguio; Maryheights Campus 8 hectares (80,000 m^{2}) Brgy. Bakakeng, Baguio
- Alma Mater song: "Saint Louis Hymn"
- Patron Saint: St. Aloysius de Gonzaga
- Colors: Blue and White
- Nicknames: Louisian Navigators; Navigators
- Sporting affiliations: BBEAL
- Website: www.slu.edu.ph

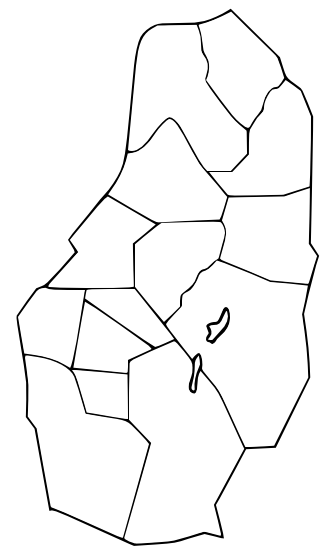
- Location in Benguet Location in Luzon Location in the Philippines

Saint Louis University (Note: Spanish: Universidad de San Luis; Tagalog: Pamantasan ng San Luis; Ibaloi: Unibersidad ni San Luis; Kankanaey: Unibersidad di San Luis; Ilocano: Unibersidad ti San Luis) also referred to by its acronym SLU, is a private Catholic research university run by the Congregation of the Immaculate Heart of Mary in Baguio, Philippines. It was founded on December 1, 1911, by the CICM Missionaries.

Saint Louis University offers programs at the elementary, secondary, undergraduate and graduate levels. It has campuses throughout the Baguio metropolitan area. SLU is PAASCU-accredited and one of the universities in the Cordillera Administrative Region which passed the newly mandated CHED's Institutional Sustainability Assessment. It is under the CICM Philippines School Network or CICM-PSN. It is the oldest of the CICM-PSN schools. The patron saint of the university is St. Aloysius de Gonzaga. It is the largest university north of Manila with more than 40,000 students (elementary, high school and college combined) as of A.Y. 2018–2019.

The Commission on Higher Education (CHED) has identified several of the university's graduate programs as either Centers of Excellence or Centers of Development. SLU currently has three Centers of Excellence (COEs) and eight Centers of Development (CODs).

== History ==
=== Foundation ===
Saint Louis University was founded on December 1, 1911, by Rev. Fr. Seraphin Devesse, CICM for 10 local boys in the City of Baguio. Along with his relocated St. Patrick Church, he founded a one-room elementary school in Baguio at what is now Cathedral Hill for ten local boys, naming it the Saint Louis School. In 1907, eight CICM missionaries arrived in the Philippines, mandated by the Holy See to Christianize the northern part of the country. Divided into two groups, one set out for Baguio. They settled in Baguio because of its proximity to Manila and the mountain province of Benguet beyond the Cordillera mountain range, which was home to numerous indigenous tribes. In 1908, Fr. Seraphin Devesse, CICM, built the first Catholic Church in Baguio, naming it St. Patrick Church, in honor of St. Patrick, who was then patron saint of Baguio.

=== Early developments ===
In 1912, he opened a second church and school along Naguilian Road, then named the St. Louis Campo Filipino. It currently houses the high school department of St. Louis School Center, which is under the stewardship of the ICM sisters. St. Louis Campo Filipino, later renamed Holy Family College in 1935, would later relocate to San Fernando, La Union in 1952. It is now known as Saint Louis College of San Fernando, one of the CICM-PSN Schools. In 1915, under the stewardship of Fr. Florimond Carlu, CICM, the St. Louis School expanded, becoming a vocational and trade school, training students in silversmithing, carpentry, hat-making, weaving, and shoe-making. In 1921, Saint Louis High School opened.

As World War II broke out in 1939, St. Louis School resumed classes in 1942, until it became impossible to do so. Classes were then suspended until 1945. Due to the carpet bombing of Baguio, the school's buildings were destroyed. Tents were thus used as temporary classrooms.

In 1952, the combined efforts of Msgr. William Brasseur, Rev. Fr. Rafael Desmedt, CICM, and Rev Fr. Karel Pieters, CICM, founded Saint Louis College, then consisting of three departments: Education, Liberal Arts, and Commerce and Secretarial. The school started with only 75 students with Rev. Fr. Gerard Decaestecker, CICM, as its first rector. In 1955, the graduate-level programs of Saint Louis College were granted recognition.

=== University status ===
On 13 May 1963, Saint Louis College was conferred university status by the Philippine government under the presidency of Diosdado Macapagal, becoming the first private university north of Manila. with Rev. Fr. Gerard Linssen, CICM transitioning from its third rector to become its first president. From its Gonzaga Campus along General Luna Road, which was then SLU's main campus, it transferred to its current main campus, the Mount Mary Campus, in 1969, which is located along Andres Bonifacio Street. SLU now uses the Gonzaga campus for its elementary department.

=== 1990 Luzon earthquake ===
During the 7.7 magnitude earthquake on July 16, 1990, classes were luckily suspended earlier due to student protests preventing casualties and damage to the university's infrastructure. SLU accommodated victims of the earthquake at its open court grounds.

=== Recent developments ===
During the term of Rev. Fr. Paul van Parijs, CICM, which was from 1996 to 2005, SLU was able to acquire two additional campuses, one in Navy Base and another in Bakakeng.

On May 10, 1977, the Saint Louis University Hospital of the Sacred Heart (SLU-HSH) was opened. It serves as a training hospital for the university's Schools of Medicine, Nursing and Natural Sciences. It is one of the hospitals in Baguio. In mid-2022, it was renamed as the Saint Louis University Sacred Heart Medical Center (SLU-SHMC), in conjunction with the opening of its twin tower hospital buildings.

In August 2024, President, Fr. Gilbert B. Sales inaugurated the SLU Sacred Heart Medical Center (SHMC) Medical Arts Parking Building and Doctors’ Clinics.

== Campuses ==
Saint Louis University has 4 campuses with a total land area of 24 hectares (59 acres).

- The Main Campus (Mount Mary Campus) is a 6-hectare (15-acre) compound along Andrés Bonifacio Street, Barangay Andrés Bonifacio-Caguioa-Rimando.
- The Gonzaga Campus is a 5-hectare (12-acre) campus on General Luna Street, Barangay Kabayanihan.
- The Navy Base Campus is a 5-hectare (12-acre) compound located in Navy Base, Barangay Saint Joseph Village.
- The Maryheights Campus is an 8-hectare (20-acre) compound in Barangay Bakakeng North.
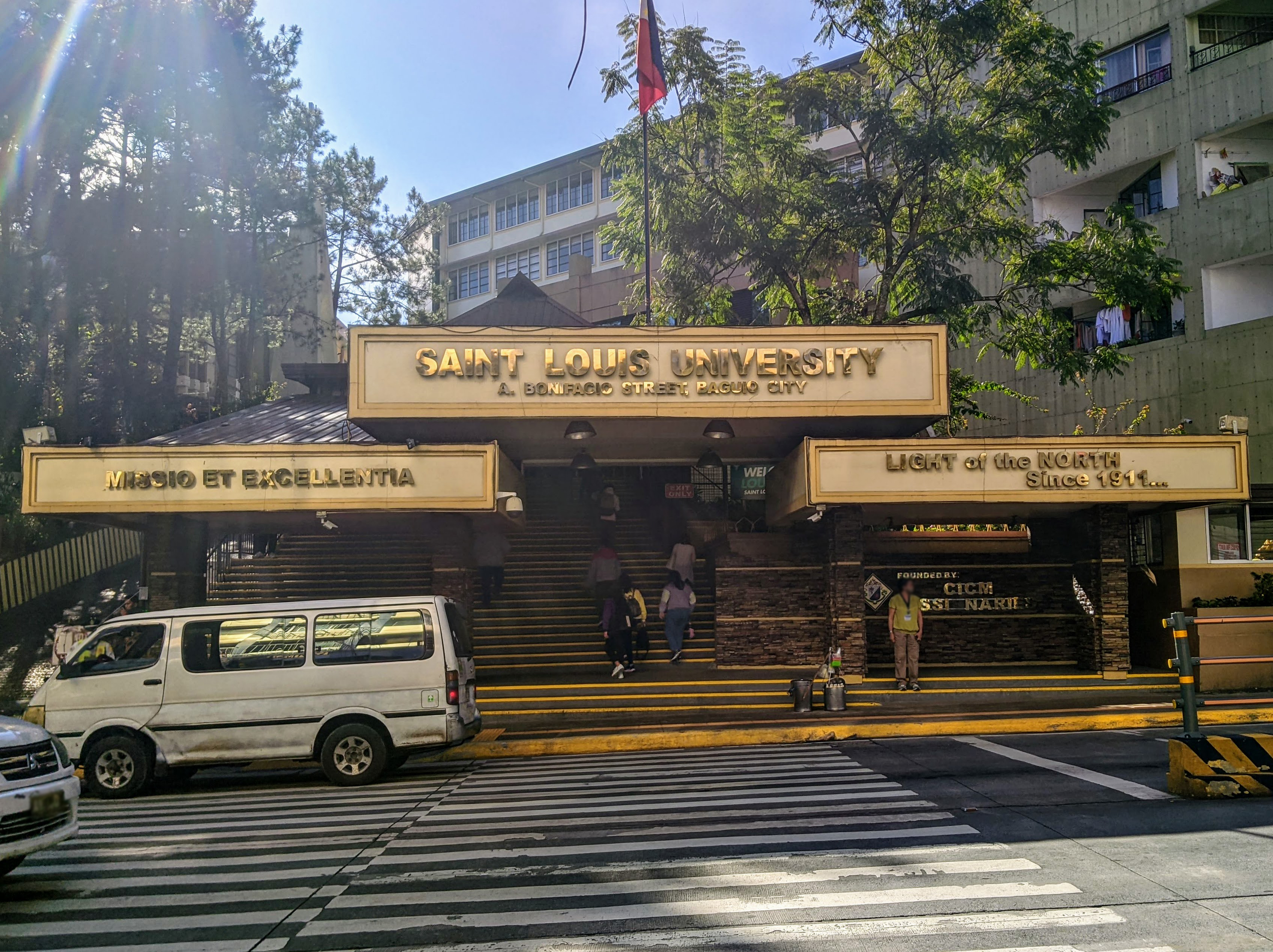
Main Campus (Main Gate)

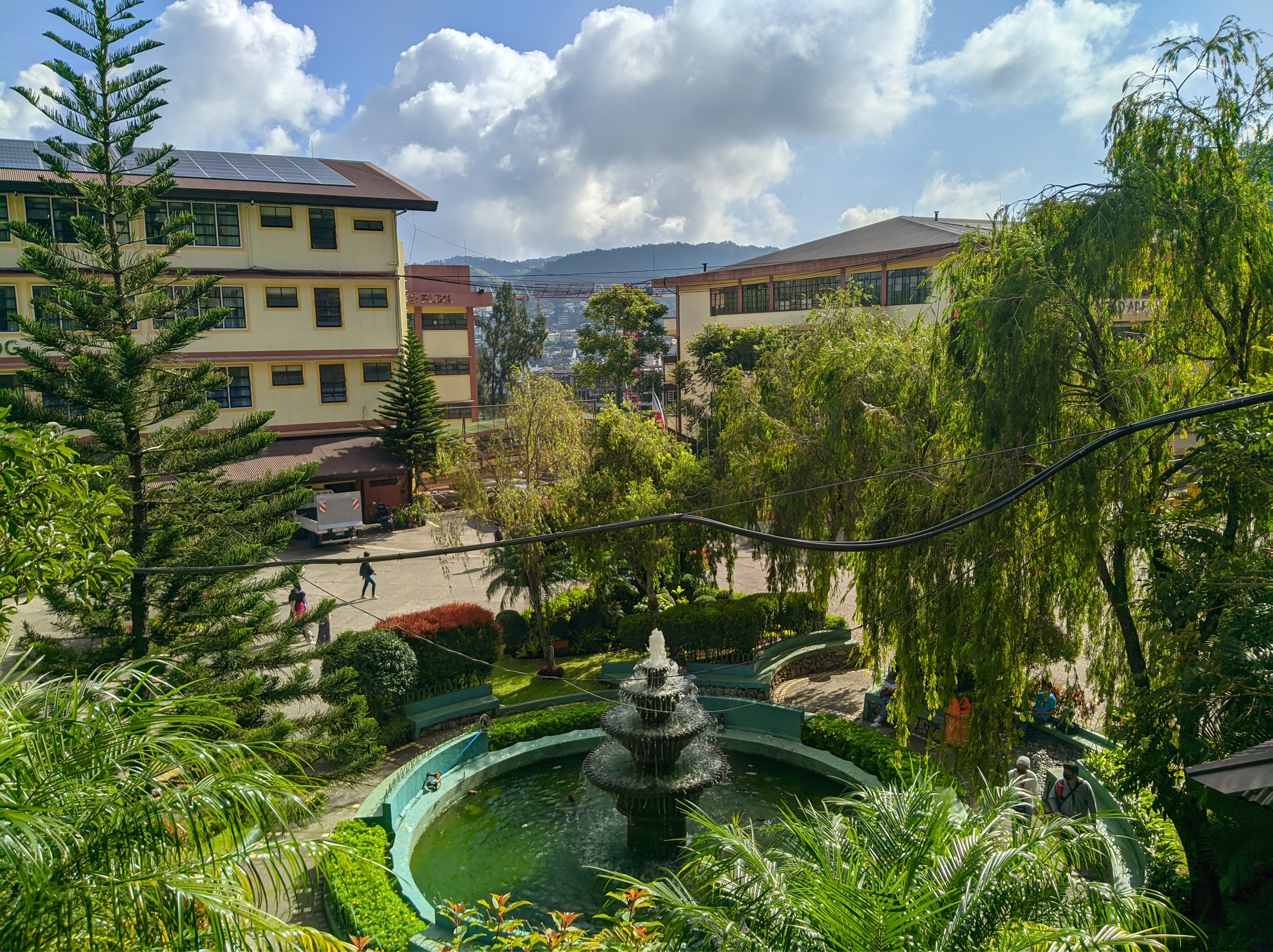
Main Campus (Fountain)

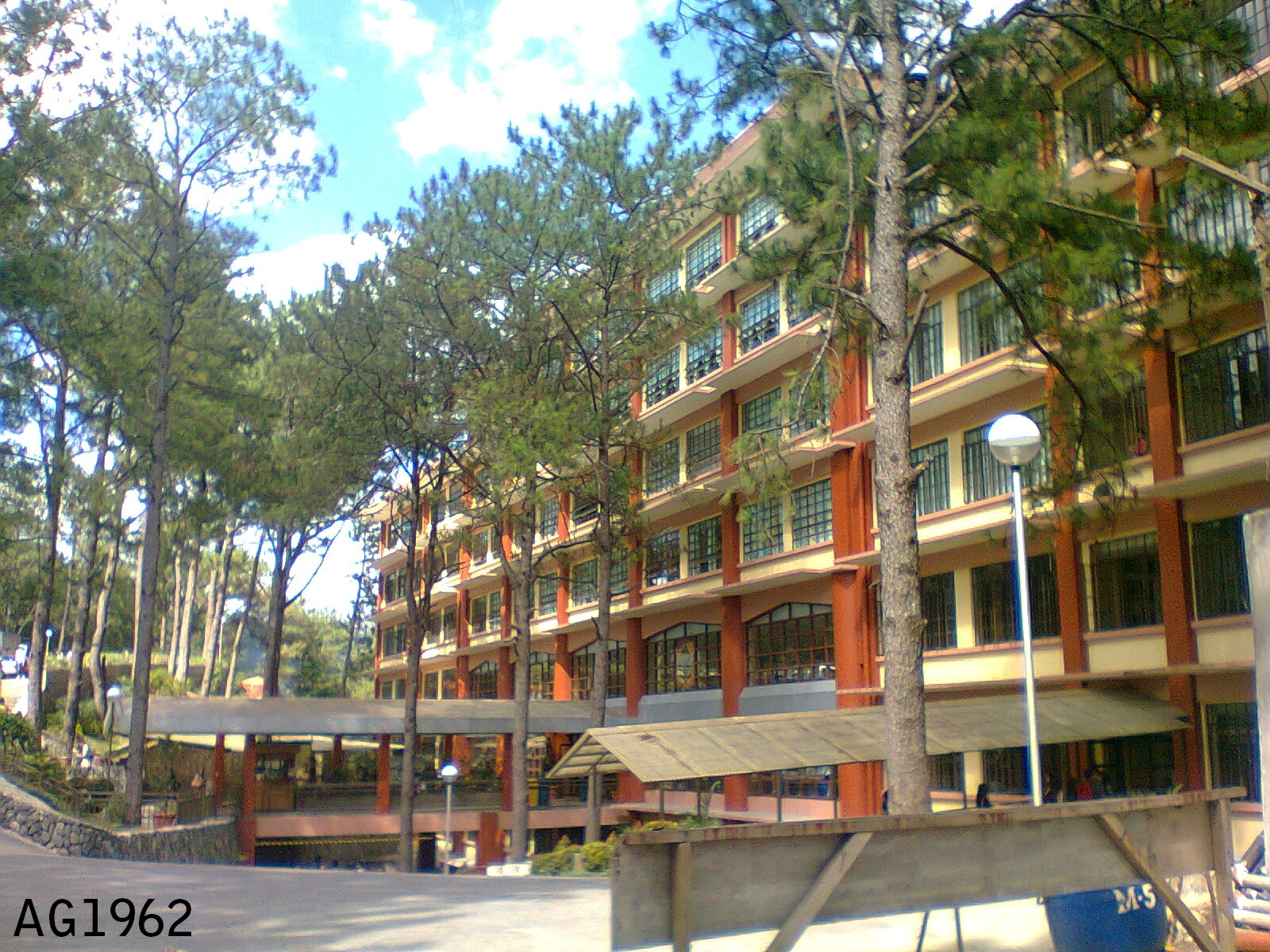
Maryheights Campus (Facade)

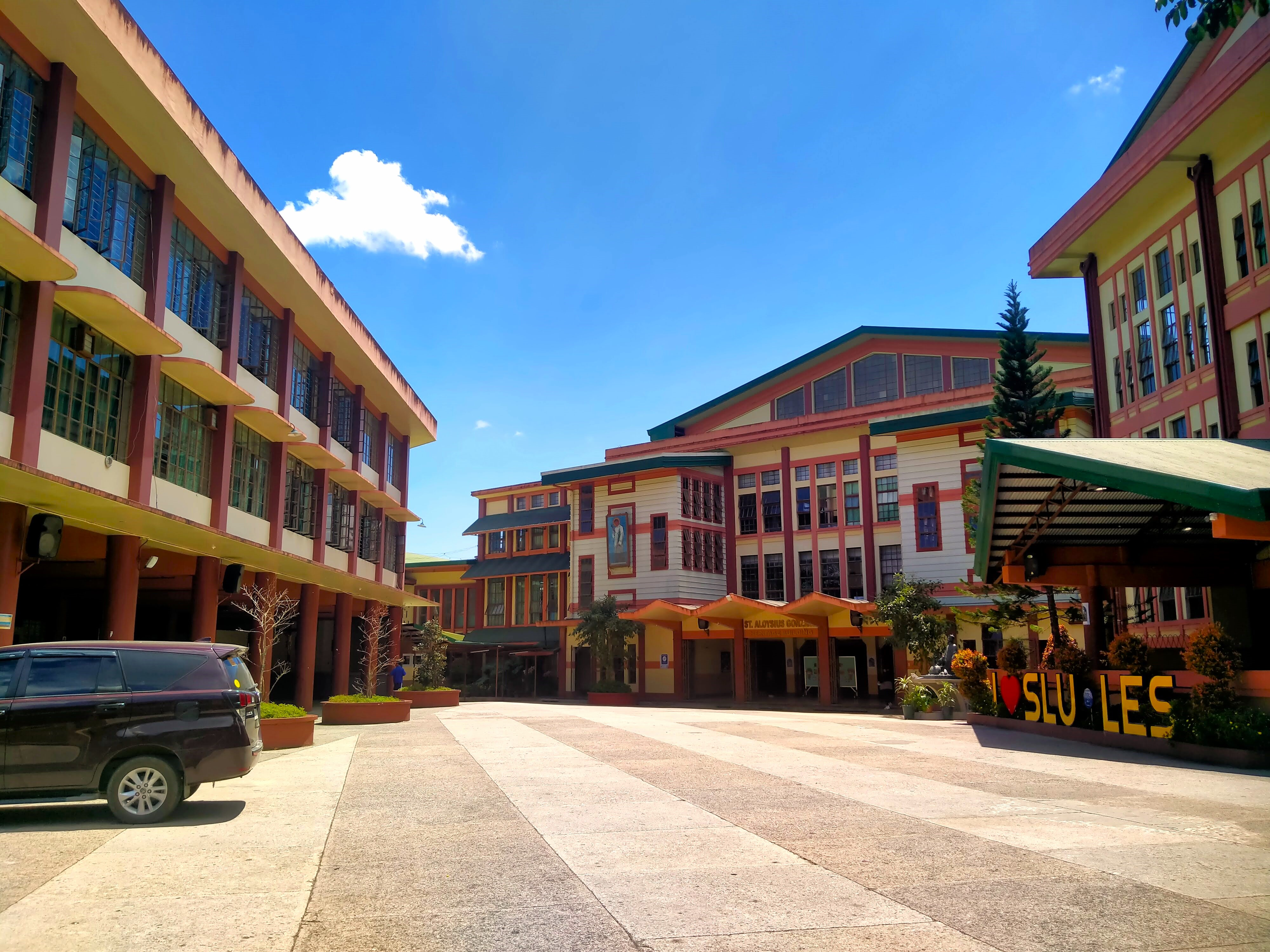
Gonzaga Campus (Facade)

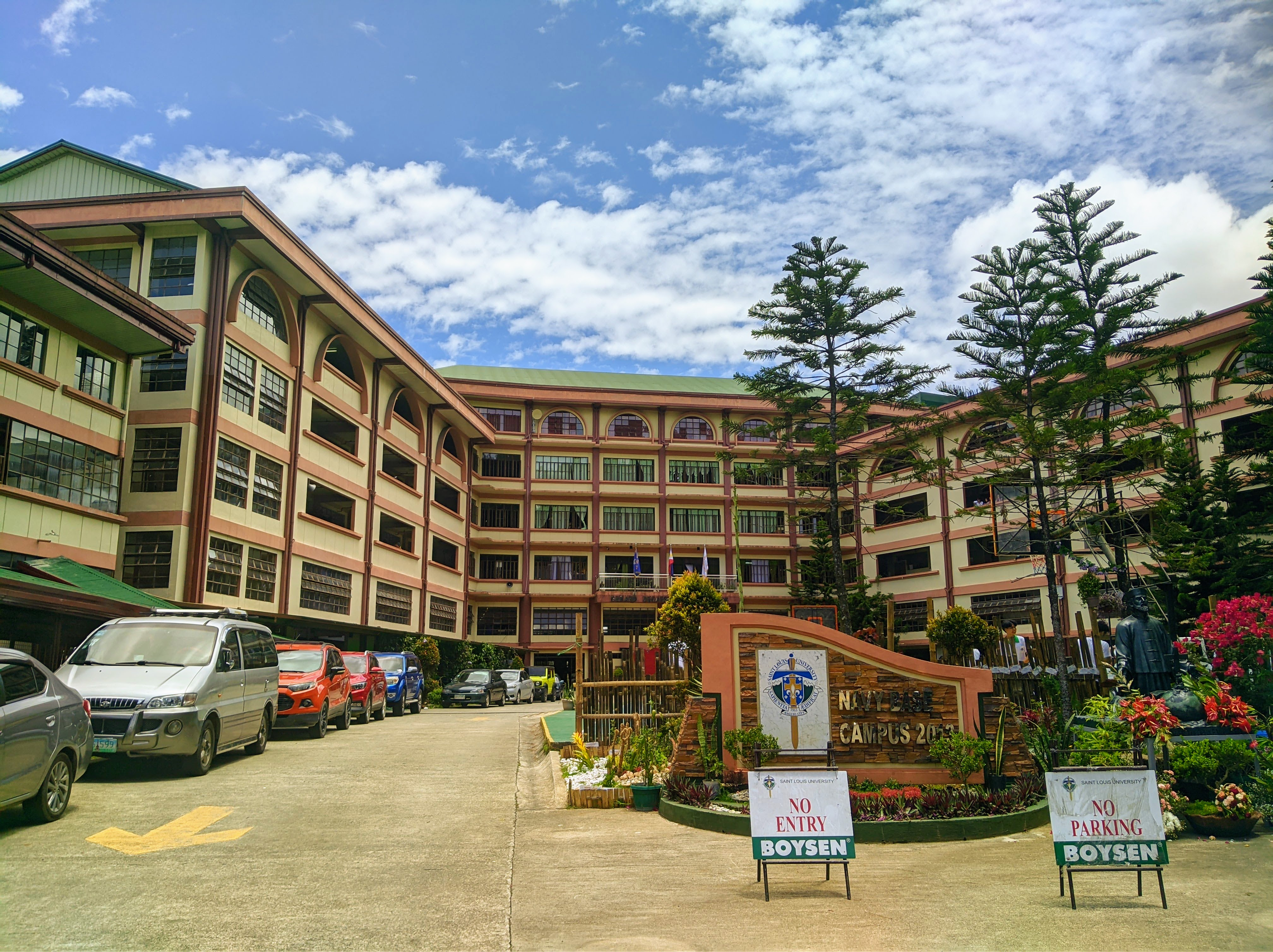
Navy Base Campus (Facade)

== Academics ==
=== Basic education ===
- Basic Education School - Laboratory Elementary Department (SLU BEdS - Elementary Department) beginning as the one classroom school in 1911, it serves as the elementary division of SLU, offering Kindergarten up to Sixth Grade since 1915. It is located at the Gonzaga Campus.
- Basic Education School - Laboratory High School Department (SLU BEdS - High School Department) is the collective name of the two departments of the high school division of SLU, subdivided into the junior and senior high departments:
  - Junior High Department is SLU's coeducational junior high department. Originally known as Saint Louis University Boys' High School, it was founded as an all-male school in 1921 and had its pioneer graduates in 1929. It became coeducational in 2003. Following the implementation of the K–12 program, it is separately administered from the senior high department. It is currently housed at SLU's Navy Base campus, alongside the senior high department.
  - Senior High Department is SLU's coeducational senior high department. it was established in 2016, following the implementation of the K–12 education curriculum system. It is currently housed at SLU's Navy Base campus, alongside the junior high department.

=== Undergraduate ===
- School of Accountancy, Management, Computing and Information Studies (SAMCIS) – is a merger of two schools, namely the School of Accountancy and Business Management, which was originally the College of Commerce, one of the four original schools of St. Louis College, and of the School of Computing and Information Sciences in 2018. It is currently housed at the Maryheights Campus of SLU. Its current OIC is Ms. Glory I. Dela Peña.
- School of Engineering and Architecture (SEA) – is one of the four original schools of St. Louis College, which was originally called the College of Engineering and Architecture. It is currently housed at the Otto Hahn Building at SLU's Main Campus. Its current dean is Engr. Jeffrey Des B. Binwag.
- School of Nursing, Allied Health and Biological Sciences (SONAHBS) – is a reunification of two schools: the School of Natural Sciences (SNS), which was once the College of Natural Science and split off from the College of Liberal Arts in 1968; and the School of Nursing, which split off from the College of Natural Sciences in 1976. Its current dean is Dr. Ann P. Opiña.
- School of Teacher Education and Liberal Arts (STELA) – is a merger of two schools, namely the School of Teacher Education, which was originally the College of Education, one of the four original schools of St. Louis College, and of the School of Humanities, originally named College of Liberal Arts, which was also one of the four original school of St. Louis College. Its current dean is Dr. Mary Pauline E. Namoca, LPT.

=== Post-graduate ===
- School of Medicine (SOM) – split from the then College of Liberal Arts in 1976, to be named as the College of Medicine. It is currently housed at the Dr. Jose P. Rizal Higher Sciences Building at the Main Campus of SLU, alongside the School of Natural Sciences. Its current dean is Dr. John Anthony A. Domantay, MD, FPSP, M.Sc., Ph.D.
- School of Law (SOL) – founded in 1954 as the College of Law. It is currently housed at the fourth floor of the renovated Diego Silang Building (now named as Professional Building)

=== Graduate ===
- School of Advanced Studies (SAS) – is the graduate school of Saint Louis University. Its current dean is Dr. Faridah Kristi C. Wetherick.

=== Library system ===
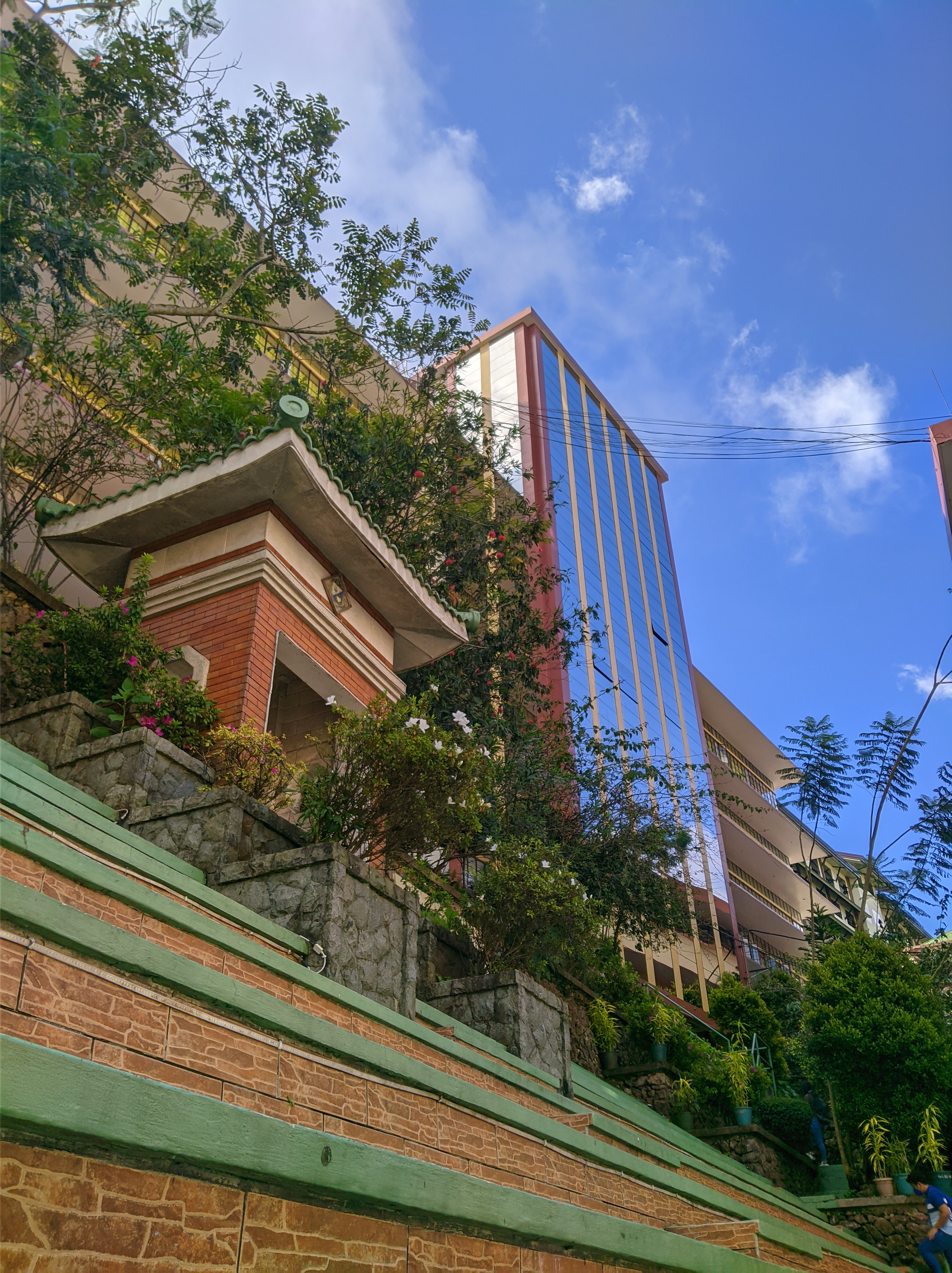
Msgr. Charles Vath Building at the SLU Main Campus

The Msgr. Charles Vath Library is the main library of Saint Louis University, housed in a seven-story building. Inaugurated on Dec. 13, 1974, it is one of the largest libraries north of Manila, housing a variety of print, non-print, electronic and internet based resources, including an American corner. It is also one of the tallest structures in the city.

A satellite library named the Fr. Seraphin Devesse, CICM Library is located on the tenth floor of the Devesse Building at SLU's Maryheights Campus. It is specially for the use of the then-separate School of Accountancy and Business Management and School of Computing and Information Sciences, which is now merged as the School of Accountancy, Management, Computing and Information Studies.

The high school and elementary departments have their own libraries. The high school department has its library housed in the Fr. Charles Pieters Library Building for the Junior High and in the Fr. Gerard Decaestecker Building for the Senior High. For the elementary department, its own library is housed in the St. Aloysius Gonzaga Heritage Building and Fr. Ghisleen De Vos Building at its Gonzaga Campus.

=== Reputation ===
SLU is in the top ten universities for their performance in Teacher Education, Law, Medicine, Medical Technology (Medical Laboratory Science), Pharmacy, Engineering, Nursing, and Architecture.

The Commission on Higher Education (CHED) has recognized three of SLU's programs as Centers of Excellence, namely its Teacher Education, Nursing and Information Technology programs. Eight of its programs are recognized as Centers of Development, namely its Business Administration, Chemical Engineering, Civil Engineering, Electrical Engineering, Entrepreneurship, Mechanical Engineering, Medical Laboratory Science, and Mining Engineering programs as of May 2016.

Its elementary and high school divisions are both accredited as Level II by the Philippine Accrediting Association of Schools, Colleges and Universities (PAASCU).

SLU is ranked 751–800 in the QS Asia Rankings, and 801–1000 in the Times Higher Education Impact Rankings.

== Research ==
The university has several research units, such as:

- Business Research Extension and Development (BREAD) – organized in 2004 under the then School of Accountancy and Business Management, the main aim of BREAD is the creation, integration and dissemination of new knowledge aimed at providing scientific, economic, socio-cultural and environmental benefits to the community. It is now part of SAMCIS.
- Engineering Urban Planning Laboratory (EUPL) – constituted under the School of Engineering and Architecture, it aims to formulate solutions to address problems and challenges of the natural environment, regional and urban systems of the community.
- Environmental Research Laboratory (ERL) – another research unit organized under the School of Engineering and Architecture, its goal is to hone research to provide solutions for the protection of the environment and quality of life.
- Information and Communications Technology Research Laboratory (ICTRL)
- Natural Sciences Research Unit (NSRU) – established in 1999 under the then College of Natural Sciences, its goal is to undertake research in the field of natural sciences, which are directed towards the assessment and use of indigenous materials, flora and fauna of the Cordilleras, while promoting their conservation and protection.
- SLU Incubator for Research, Innovation and Business Center (SIRIB) – it aims to look into bringing in technological solutions to concerns that involve the environment, disaster preparedness and mitigation, natural resources, mining and solid waste management.
- SLU Cordillera Research and Development Foundation (SLU-CRDF). – founded in 1998 as a non-stock and non-profit research foundation, its main purpose is the support and encouragement of original and creative research focused on the Cordilleran traditions and life situation, from culture to history, economy, language, philosophy and religion.
- Tuklas Lunas Development Consortium – a project with the University of the Philippines-Baguio and the Benguet State University that will focus on the documentation, standardization and formulation of dosage forms from indigenous plants and micro-organisms with anti-infective and anti-diabetic bioactivities.

== Organization and administration ==
Rectors
Name	Tenure of office
Fr. Gerard Decaestecker, CICM (+)	1952 - 1954
Fr. Albert Van Overbeke, CICM (+)	1954 - 1962
Fr. Gerard Linssen, CICM (+)	1962 - 1963
Presidents
Name	Tenure of office
Fr. Gerard Linssen, CICM (+)	1963 - 1964
Fr. Paul Zwaenepoel, CICM (+)	1964 - 1976
Fr. Ghisleen De Vos, CICM (+)	1976 - 1983
Fr. Joseph Van Den Daelen, CICM (+)	1983 - 1996
Fr. Paul Van Parijs, CICM (+)	1996 - 2005
Fr. Jessie Hechanova, CICM	2005 - 2015
Fr. Gilbert Sales, CICM	2015–present

=== Administration ===
Saint Louis University is a non-stock, non-profit institution. It is directed by a board of trustees, composed of 15 people. Since its inception as a college in 1952, it has been headed by a Rector. Upon its elevation to university status in 1963, its head has since been addressed as president. He is assisted by 5 vice-presidents. SLU has seen 3 rectors and 7 presidents lead it, 8 of whom are of Belgian descent. It was only in 2005 that SLU saw a Filipino as its president. All of its heads has since been priests of the CICM order. Its current president is Rev. Fr. Gilbert Sales, CICM, Ph.D. Ed.

=== Affiliations ===
SLU is under the CICM Philippines School Network or CICM-PSN, managed by the CICM mission.

SLU is a member of several international associations, namely the Association of Southeast Asian Institutions of Higher Learning (ASAIHL), the Association of Southeast and East Asian Catholic Colleges and Universities (ASEACCU), the International Federation of Catholic Universities (IFCU), the International Association of University Presidents (IAUP), and the University Mobility in Asia and the Pacific (UMAP) Council Inc., Philippines.

== Student life ==
=== Traditions and events ===
- SLU Intramurals – a yearly competition between the various schools of SLU, a separate one is held for the basic education and college level.
- SLU Lantern Parade – Instituted in 2008, the SLU Lantern Parade is a yearly lantern-making contest and parade of all 8 schools of SLU along Session Road at the beginning of December, ushering in the celebration of Christmas in Baguio.
- Annual Christmas Tree Lighting – SLU schools of the college level, in rotation, prepares a Christmas tree for its annual lighting ceremony. The tree is encouraged to be made out of recycled materials.

The Saint Louis University Hymn (SLU Hymn) was composed by the late Dean Macario Fronda who also composed the Panagbenga hymn of Baguio's Annual Floral Festival, with lyrics by Fr. Jan Augustijns, CICM.

=== Student organizations ===
There are currently 61 accredited student organizations at SLU.

White & Blue is SLU's official student publication. It is named after the colors representing the Blessed Virgin Mary, with which the CICM is associated. It is run by college students and is under the supervision of the publication adviser from the SLU administration. The elementary division has two student publications, namely the Young Louisian Courier, which uses English as its medium, and the Alab, SLU-LES' Filipino language publication. The high school division on the other hand has three student publications, namely The Louisian, for both Junior and Senior High, and SLU Tanglaw Hilaga for Junior High.

The Center for Culture and the Arts has six resident performing groups.

- The Tanghalang SLU
- The SLU Glee Club
- The SLU Dance Troupe
- The SLU Children's Dance Troupe
- The SLU Concert Orchestra
- The SLU Symphonic Band or popularly known as "The SLU Marching Band"

=== Athletics ===
Saint Louis University's athletics team is SLU Navigators.

== Notable people ==
- Benjamin B. Magalong – Incumbent City Mayor of Baguio, Former Deputy Chief for Operations and Former CIDG Chief of the Philippine National Police
- Boobay – actor and comedian
- Paolo Ballesteros – actor and television host
- Llyan Oliver Austria – architect and YouTube content creator.
- Cirilo F. Bautista – Poet and National Artist for Literature
- Claudia Lee Hae-in – South Korean nun and poet
- Jose Ping-ay – Congressman of Coop-NATCCO Partylist in the 14th and 15th Congress of the Republic of the Philippines.
- Kylie Verzosa – Bb. Pilipinas International 2016 & Miss International 2016
- Kidlat Tahimik – national artist
- BB Gandanghari – actress
- Paulo Avelino – model/actor
- Marky Cielo – actor
- John Medina – actor
- Benj Pacia – broadcaster (former actor)
- Jesli Lapus – former Tarlac Congressman & former DepEd & DTI Secretary & former President of Land Bank of the Philippines
- Janet Abuel – former OIC Department of Budget & Management
- Ez Mil - musical artist

== See also ==
- Saint Louis College La Union, San Fernando City, La Union
- University of Saint Louis Tuguegarao, Tuguegarao City, Cagayan Valley
- Saint Mary's University, Bayombong, Nueva Vizcaya
