= Saint Louis University International School of Medicine =

Medical school in Baguio, Philippines

- Type: Private, Roman Catholic
- Established: 1976
- Dean: John Anthony Domantay
- Location: Dr. Jose Rizal Bldg., Saint Louis University Main Campus, A. Bonifacio St., Baguio, Philippines; 16°25′05″N 120°35′53″E
- Colors: White and blue
- Website: www.slu.edu.ph

The Saint Louis University-International School of Medicine is one of the nine academic units of Saint Louis University, a private, Roman Catholic, CICM university in the Philippines. It is housed at Dr. Jose Rizal Building inside the SLU Main campus adjacent to its partner hospital, the Saint Louis University-Hospital of the Sacred Heart founded a year after the school's foundation in 1976.

The school is the first and by far the only medical school in the Cordillera region.

== Program ==
- Doctor of Medicine (MD)
