= Patrick James McGlinchey =

Irish missionary in Korea (1928–2018)

- Born: 6 June 1928
- Died: 23 April 2018 (aged 89)
- Resting place: Jeju Province, South Korea
- Citizenship: Ireland, South Korea (posthumous)
- Known for: Improving agriculture in Jeju Province

Father Patrick James McGlinchey (6 June 1928 – 23 April 2018), Korean name Im Pi-je (임피제), was an Irish Catholic missionary from Raphoe, County Donegal. He was credited with mobilizing international support and foreign volunteers to modernize livestock farming in South Korea.

McGlinchey arrived in Jeju, South Korea in 1954 under the auspices of the Missionary Society of St. Columban, and established the St. Isidore Farm in 1961. His work with the latter earned him the nickname "pig priest".

He received the Ramon Magsaysay Award in 1975 and Ireland's Presidential Distinguished Service Award in 2014.

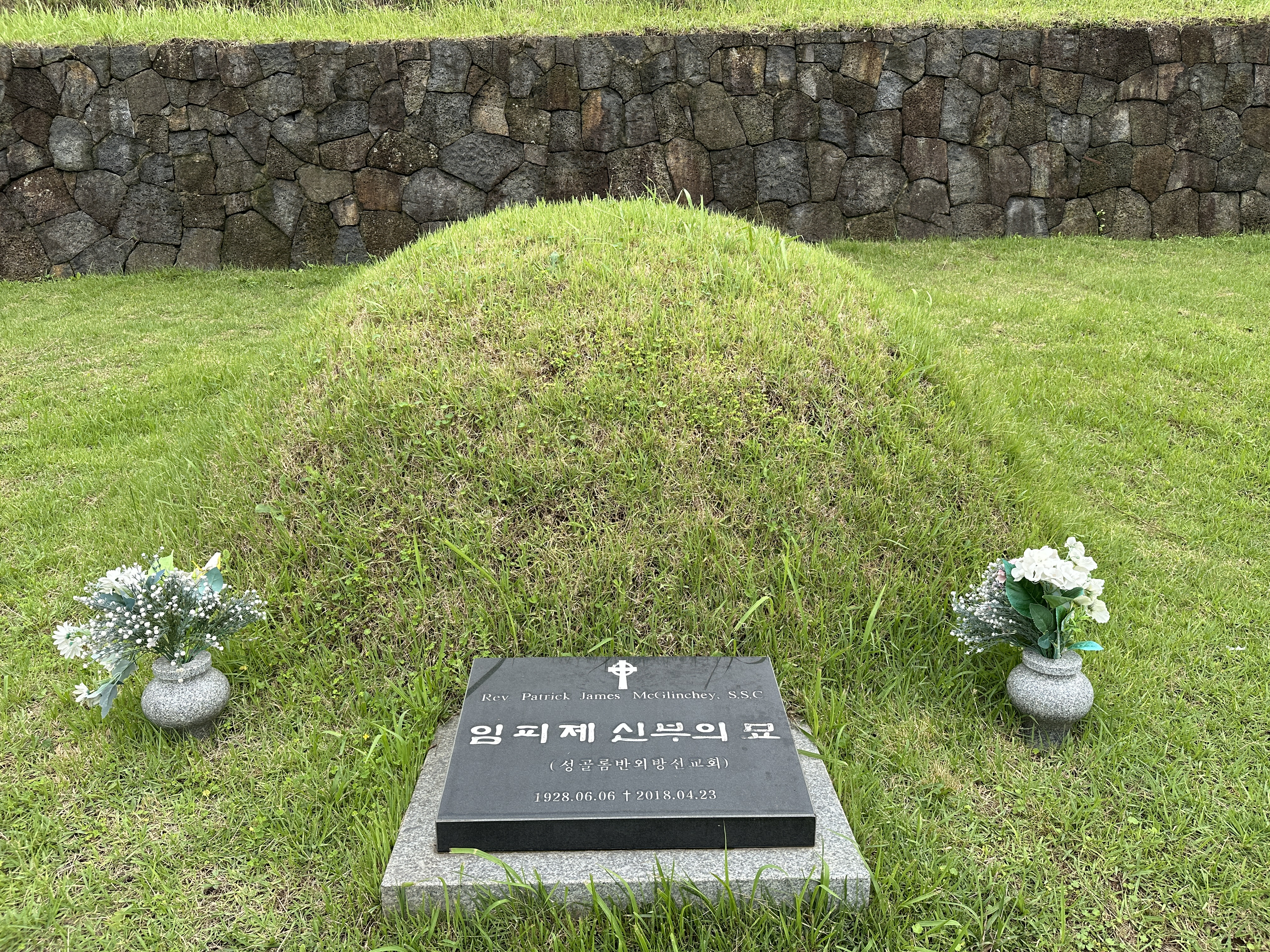
McGlinchey's grave (2024)

He died on 23 April 2018 at the age of 89 while undergoing treatment for myocardial infarction and kidney failure. After his death, he was named an Honorary Citizen of South Korea in June 2018 in a ceremony attended by his nephew.
