= Seo Jeong-ju =

Korean poet and university professor

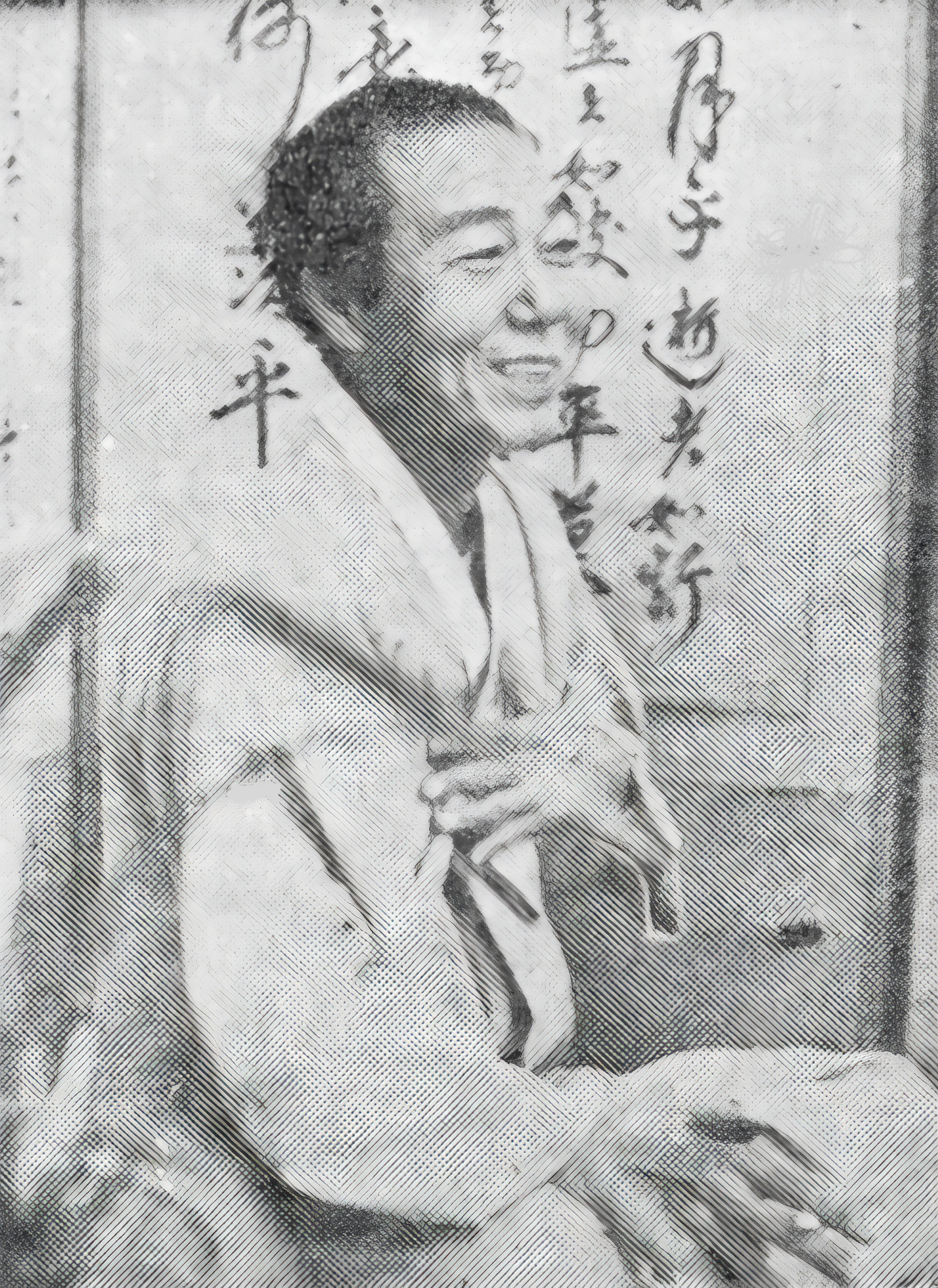
- Born: May 8, 1915; Gochang County, North Jeolla Province
- Died: December 24, 2000 (aged 85)
- Writing career
- Language: Korean

Korean name
- Hangul: 서정주
- Hanja: 徐廷柱
- RR: Seo Jeongju
- MR: Sŏ Chŏngju

Art name
- Hangul: 미당
- Hanja: 未堂
- RR: Midang
- MR: Midang

Seo Jeong-ju (Korean: 서정주; May 18, 1915 – December 24, 2000) was a Korean poet and academic who wrote under the art name Midang (미당; lit. 'not yet fully grown'). He is widely considered one of the best poets in twentieth-century Korean literature and was nominated five times for the Nobel Prize in literature.

== Biography ==
Seo Jeong-ju was born in Gochang County, Zenrahoku Province, Korea, Empire of Japan. He received his primary education in Seodang village until 1924. The traditional stories told him by his grandmother, his primary education and his youthful experiences influenced his literary style. He went to Jung-Ang Buddhist College, but he dropped out of school in 1936 after being involved in a demonstration. In 1936, his poem, Byuk (Wall), was published in The Dong-a Ilbo newspaper. He became a pro-Japanese activist, and wrote various poems in praise of Japanese Imperialism in the late colonial period.

After the independence of Korea, he worked as a professor of literature at Dongguk University and others from 1959 to 1979. Since his wife's death in October 2000, he barely ate or drank anything besides beer and died on December 24, 2000.

== Works ==
Seo Jeong-ju's early works were modernistic and also surrealistic, influenced mostly by foreign literature. His first collection of poems, Wha-Sa Jip (Flower snake), was published in 1941. The book explores humanity's feelings of guilt and folklore. His poem Jahwasang (Portrait) describes a young poet who struggles with the legacy of his ancestry. He wrote Japanophilic literature for the newspaper Mail Ilbo from 1942 to 1944 under the Japanese penname, Datsushiro Shizuo (達城靜雄).

The publication of Village of Poets (Siin burak), a literary coterie journal that Seo founded along with Kim Tong-ni and Ham Hyeongsu, marks the beginning of his literary career. After the Liberation, Seo was actively involved in the formation of the Association of Joseon Literary Youth (Joseon cheongnyeon munhakga hyeophoe) and in 1949 he became one of the key founding members of the Association of Korean Writers (Hanguk munin hyeophoe). He was nominated as a lifetime member of the Arts Center (Yesulwon) in 1954. He also gave frequent lectures in poetry at Dongguk University.

Seo's influence on Korean poetry stems in part from the poems in The Early Lyrics 1941–1960. Baudelaire's influence is unmistakable in his early poetry. Primeval and even demonic in tone, Seo's first volume of poetry Hwasajip explores men's awareness of original sin and the primeval life force against the backdrop of local or indigenous colors. After the liberation, however, the concept of original sin and predestination that marked his early poetry was replaced by the quest for never-ending life found in eastern philosophy. Gwichokdo, for example, suggests the poet's return to Buddhist ways of thought and classical style. Seo Jeongju Poems (1956), contains work that sings of a certain reconciliation between nature and han, a deep-seated sense of grief, as well as the poems "Crane" (Hak) and "A Prayer" (Gido) that show the poet's artistic maturity and his capacity for self-perception.

With Sillacho, Seo reached a new artistic height. The ancient country of Silla has long been the wellspring of the poet's artistic inspiration and transcendental vision, a country more akin to an imaginary homeland where nature and men exist in perfect unity, than a historical entity. Rooted in Buddhist thought, it revives the concept of karma and the philosophy of Zen Buddhism. Dongcheon, a collection of poems published in 1969, also reveals Seo's interest in Buddhist symbolism.

== Legacy ==
According to translator Brother Anthony, Seo Jeong-ju was the founding father of modern Korean poetry, and his works have been translated into a number of languages, including English, French, Spanish, and German. In 2007, he was listed by the Korean Poets' Association among the ten most important modern Korean poets. His 100th anniversary in December 2016 was scheduled to be commemorated by the republication of his collected works which will now include recently discovered and previously unpublished poems. The Midang Literary House was opened in the year after his death, sited in poet's native village and final resting place. The Midang Literary Prize is presented there during the chrysanthemum season, in commemoration of his most famous poem, "Beside the Chrysanthemum" (국화옆에서):

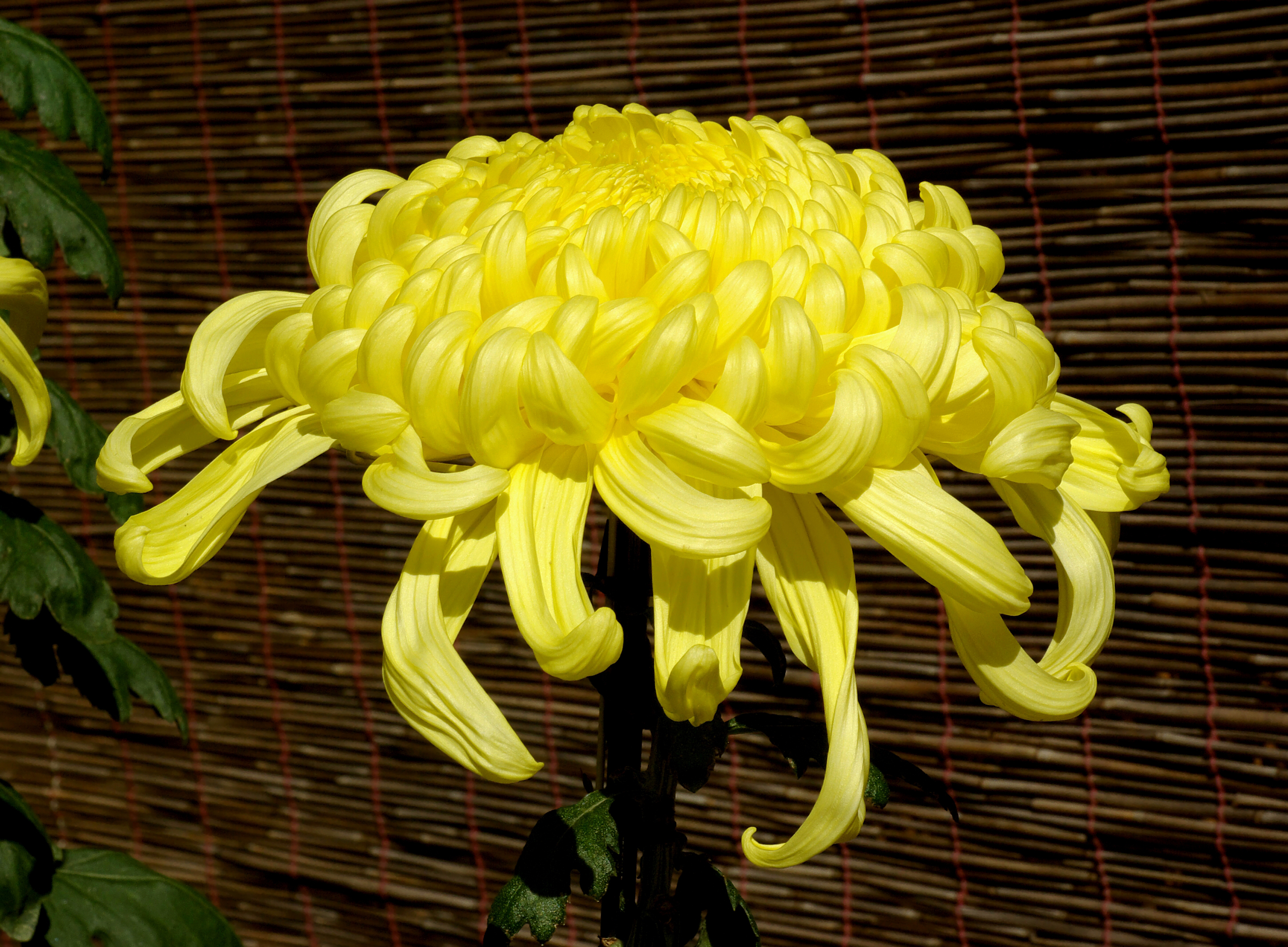
"For your yellow petals to open"

한 송이의 국화꽃을 피우기 위해
봄부터 소쩍새는
그렇게 울었나 보다.

한 송이의 국화꽃을 피우기 위해
천둥은 먹구름 속에서
또 그렇게 울었나 보다.

그립고 아쉬움에 가슴 조이던
머언 먼 젊음의 뒤안길에서
인제는 돌아와 거울 앞에 선
내 누님같이 생긴 꽃이여.

노오란 네 꽃잎이 피려고
간밤엔 무서리가 저리 내리고
내게는 잠도 오지 않았나 보다.

Translation:

To bring one chrysanthemum
to flower, the cuckoo has cried
since spring.

To bring one chrysanthemum to bloom,
thunder has rolled
through the black clouds.

Flower, like my sister returning
from distant, youthful byways
of throat-tight longing
to stand by the mirror:

for your yellow petals to open,
last night such a frost fell,
and I did not sleep.

— Translated by David R. McCann

The chrysanthemum blooms in late autumn and is associated with the first frosts, the point at which the poem comes to rest. First published in 1948, it was set by the Korean composer Hwang Byungki in 1962.

== Works in translation ==
- "Unforgettable Things" (안 잊혀지는 일들)
- Early Lyrics 1941–1960, The Poems by SO Chong-Ju (Midang) (bilingual) Translated and Introduced by Brother Anthony of Taizé, 1998 *Poems of a Wanderer by Midang So Chong-Ju, Chongju So, Kevin O'Rourke (Translator), Chong-Ju So, 1995
- The Early Lyrics of So Chong Ju by Midang, Anthony of Taize (Translator), 1993

== Works in Korea (partial) ==
- Complete Literary Works of Seo Jeongju (Seo Jeongju munhakjeonjip) in five volumes was published by Iljisa in 1972
- Complete Poems of Midang (Midang si jeonjip) was published by Mineumsa in 1994

== See also ==
- Korean poetry
- Korean literature
- List of Korean-language poets
- Poet Midang Memorial Hall
- Midang Literary Award
