= Claudia Lee Hae-in =

South Korean poet (born 1933)

Mother Claudia Lee Hae-in O.S.B
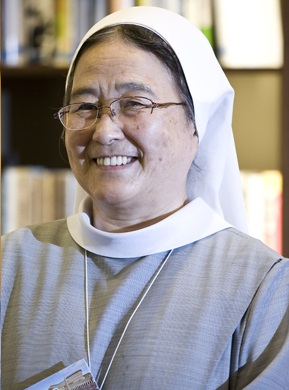
- Born: Lee Myeong-suk (baptismal name: Velladetta); 7 June 1945 (age 81); Yanggu County, Gangwon, South Korea
- Education: Saint Louis University (AB); Sogang University (AB)
- Writing career
- Language: Korean
- Genres: Poetry, essays
- Notable awards: Donga Women's Prize (1985); Busan Women's Literature Award (1985); Cheong Sang-beong Literary Award (2006); Gumin Award (2016)

Korean name
- Hangul: 이명숙
- Hanja: 李明淑
- RR: I Myeongsuk
- MR: I Myŏngsuk

Pen name
- Hangul: 이해인
- Hanja: 李海仁
- RR: I Haein
- MR: I Haein
- Website: Olivetan Benedictine Sisters

Claudia Lee Hae-in (Korean: 이해인, born 7 June 1945) is a South Korean Catholic nun, poet, and essayist. She has sold almost two million copies of her books of poetry and been regarded as "Korea's next contender for the Nobel Prize in Literature."

== Biography ==
Lee Hae-in was born on 7 June 1945, in Yanggu County, Gangwon to Catholic parents, Lee Dae-young and Kim Sun-ok. Three days after she was born, she was baptized Catholic with the name Velladetta. At a very young age, she displayed immense literary talent. At the outbreak of the Korean War on 25 June 1950, her father was detained and taken to North Korea and the remaining family were forced to flee to Busan, South Korea.

After completing her secondary education, she entered religious life in 1964 as an Olivetan Benedictine Sister in Busan. She pronounced her first vows in 1968 and perpetual vows in 1976. She graduated with a degree in English from the Saint Louis University in Baguio, Philippines.

From 1992 to 1997, she was appointed as the General-Secretary of her order in Korea. She was diagnosed with rectal cancer in 2008, and after receiving medical treatments, has returned to good health. In 2015, fake news spread on the internet claiming the nun had died, which she jokingly ignored by saying, "I could forgive the fake news, but I can't go easy on the fake poem."

She had solid friendship with the poet Park Wan-suh and the Venerable Buddhist monk Beopjeong, whom she both noted as having greatly influenced her in life and works.

== Writing ==
=== Poetry ===
Lee made her debut as a poet with the poem "Flower Shovel" in the Catholic Journal Soyeon in 1970. The poem was a conversation with a natural occurrence based on her daily experiences. Her reputation as a poet grew following the publication in 1976 of her first collection of poems titled, The Land of Dandelions. She became known for her works because of its clarity and simplicity, and its usage of plain Korean language with deep-seated messages and meanings which makes the readers reflect.

Other inspiring collections of Lee's poetry and essays include; Light a Fire in My Soul (1979), The Face of Time (1989), A Little Prayer (2011), Happiness of Waiting (2018) and As If Leaves Are Seen After Flowers Fall (2011). Her poem "The Love Song of a Dandelion" which is a reflection on both consolation and hope appeared in Korean middle school text books.

From 1998 to 2002, she carried out her missionary works through a literary forum called "Hae-in's Writing Room" and delivered a series of lectures in various parts of the country on the theme "Poetry and Spirituality in Life."

== Awards and recognitions ==
She has received six awards for her outstanding contributions to literature:

- 1981: New Sprouts Literary Award
- 1985: Donga Women's Prize
- 1985: Busan Women's Literature Award
- 2004: Woollim Arts Award
- 2006: Cheong Sang-beong Literary Award
- 2016: Gumin Award

In recent years, Lee has been regarded as Korea's likely candidate for the Nobel Prize in Literature, along with the authors Ko Un, Kim Hyesoon and Hwang Sok-yong.

== Publications ==
From an early age, Lee Hae-in was passionate about writing and as a Catholic nun explored the significant connections between poetry and spirituality. She has published 18 collections of poetry, 12 books on essays and 6 anthologies of her poems, which are included in high school textbooks.

=== Poetry collections ===
Year	Original title	English title	Publisher
1976	민들레의 영토	The Land of Dandelions	Catholic Books Publishing
1979	내 혼에 불을 놓아	Light A Fire in my Soul	Bundo Books
1983	오늘은 내가 반달로 떠도	If I Rise as a Half-Moon Today	Bundo Books
1989	시간의 얼굴	The Face of Time	Bundo Books
1992	엄마와 분꽃	Mommy and the Sunflower	Bundo Books
1999	외딴 마을의 빈집이 되고 싶다	To Be an Empty House in a Secluded Village	Yolimwon Publishing
1999	다른 옷은 입을 수가 없네	I Can't Wear Other Clothes	Yolimwon Publishing
2002	작은 위로	Small Comfort	Yolimwon Publishing
2007	작은 기쁨	Small Joy	Yolimwon Publishing
2008	엄마	Mom	Samtoh Publishing
2010	희망은 깨어있네	Hope Is Awake	Mind Walk Books
2011	작은기도	A Little Prayer	Yolimwon Publishing
2013	이해인 시전집	Hae-in Lee Poems	Literary Thought
2014	필 때도 질 때도 동백꽃처럼	Like a Camelia When It Blooms and Withers	Mind Walk Books
2015	서로 사랑하면 언제라도 봄	Whenever We Love Each Other, It's Always Spring	Yellimul Publishing
2019	친구에게	To a Friend	Samtoh Publishing
2022	꽃잎 한 장처럼	Like a Single Petal	Samtoh Publishing
2023	인생의 열 가지 생각	Ten Thoughts on Life	Mind Walk Books

=== Essays ===
Year	Original title	English title	Publisher
1986	두레박	Durebak	Bundo Books
1994	꽃삽	Flower Shovel	Samtoh Publishing
1997	사랑할 땐 별이 되고	When You Love, You Become a Star	Samtoh Publishing
2002	향기로 말을 거는 꽃처럼	Like a Flower That Speaks With Its Scents	Spring Co.
2004	기쁨이 열리는 창	The Window Where Happiness Rests	Mind Walk Books
2006	풀꽃 단상	Flower Pots	Bundo Books
2006	사랑은 외로운 투쟁	Love Is A Lonely Struggle	Mind Walk Books
2011	꽃이 지고 나면 잎이 보이듯이	As If Leaves Are Seen After Flowers Fall	Samtoh Publishing
2018	고운 마음 꽃이 되고 고운 말은 빛이 되고	A Kind Heart Becomes a Flower, A Kind Word Becomes a Light	Spring Co.
2018	기다리는 행복	Happiness of Waiting	Samtoh Publishing
2019	그 사랑 놓치지 마라	Don't Miss That Love	Samtoh Publishing
2020	이해인의 말	Lee Hae-in's Words	Mind Walk Books

=== Anthologies ===
Year	Original title	English title	Publisher
1993	사계절의 기도	Prayer of the Four Seasons	Bundo Books
2000	고운새는 어디 숨었을까	Where Did the Beautiful Bird Hide?	Samtoh Publishing
2001	여행 중	On a Journey	Pagusa Publishing
2005	눈꽃 아가	Snowflake Baby	Yolimwon Publishing
2006	꽃은 흩어지고 그리움은 모이고	Flowers Scatter and Longing Gathers	Bundo Books
2013	나를 키우는 말	Words That Lifted Me	Poet's Though Books

== See also ==
- Korean literature
- Korean poetry
