= Kim Jong-ki =

Activist

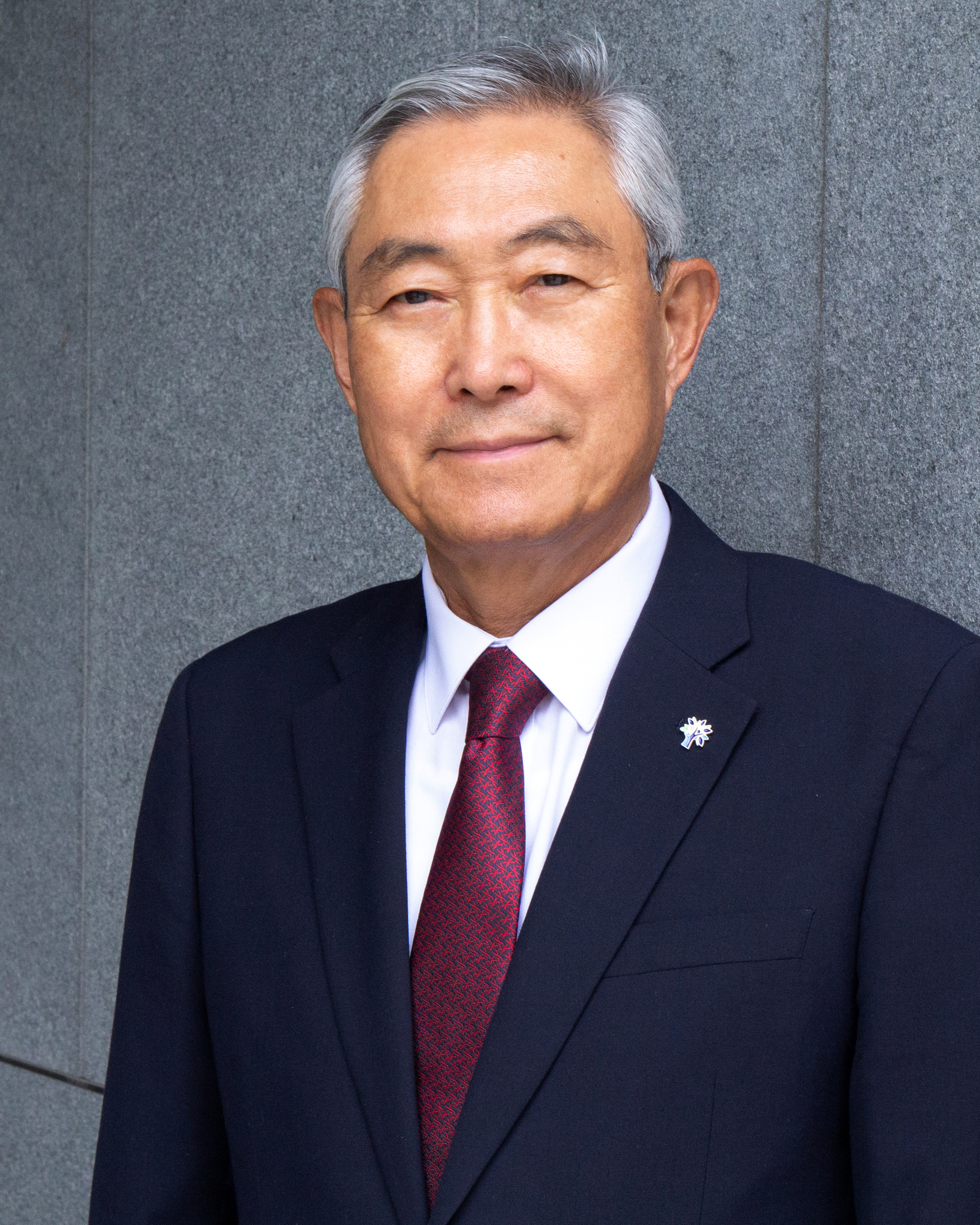
- Born: 4 July 1947 (age 79); Mokpo, South Jeolla Province, South Korea
- Occupations: Businessman, advocate
- Known for: Founder and Honorary Chairman of The Blue Tree Foundation

Kim Jong-ki is a South Korean businessman and anti-youth violence advocate against the school violence. Kim established the Foundation for Preventing Youth Violence (FPYV) after his son committed suicide due to school bullying. The FPYV raises awareness on the issue of school bullying and creates programs for youth development. In 2019, The FPYV changed its name to The Blue Tree Foundation. In 1999, he embarked on his journey of recognition by receiving the MBC 99’ Good Korean Citizen Award, Grand Prize. He continued to receive an award such as the 5th Youth Protection Award in 2002. His commitment to volunteer service was acknowledged with the Yujip Award, Silver Medal, in 2004. He achieved the Order of Civil Merit, Dongbaekjang, in 2010, followed by the Grand Prize at the 24th ASAN Award in 2012. The year 2014 marked a milestone as he became the first Ashoka Senior Fellow in South Korea. Continuing his journey, he was honored with the 32nd Inchon Award in the Education category in 2018. He became a rare case, being both the first and the last non-educator to be selected in Education category. He is a recipient of Ramon Magsaysay Award in 2019 for his advocacy for the youth. Kim was recognized "for his quiet courage in transforming private grief into the mission to protect Korea's youth from the scourge of bullying and violence; his unstinting dedication to the goal of instilling among the young the values of self-esteem, tolerance, and mutual respect; and his effectively mobilizing all sectors of the country in a nationwide drive that has transformed both policy and behaviors towards building a gentler, non-violent society."

In March 2026, Kim received the Hyupsung Social Contribution Award, presented by the Hyupsung Cultural Foundation, in recognition of more than 30 years of dedication to preventing school violence.
