= Sinai Hamada =

Filipino writer, journalist, and lawyer

- Born: Sinai Cariño Hamada; 1911; Baguio, Philippines
- Died: September 1991 (aged 79–80); Baguio, Philippines
- Education: University of the Philippines
- Occupations: Writer, journalist, lawyer
- Writing career
- Language: English
- Period: 1934–1991
- Notable work: Tanabata's Wife

Sinai Cariño Hamada (1911 – September 1991) was a Filipino writer, journalist, and lawyer. He was the founder and editor of the Baguio Midland Courier and The Cordillera Post.

== Early life and education ==
Hamada was born in Baguio to Ryukichi Hamada, a Japanese immigrant, and Josefa Cariño, daughter of prominent Ibaloi chieftain Mateo Cariño. Sinai had an older brother, Oseo. His father died when he was a month old. His mother later married Teruji Okubo and bore three children: Policarpio, Bernardo, and writer and activist Cecilia Afable.

He graduated with a journalism degree from the University of the Philippines and later received his law degree from the University of the Philippines College of Law. From 1936 to 1937, Hamada served as Editor-in-Chief of the Philippine Collegian. He was also a member of the Upsilon Sigma Phi fraternity.

== Legal career ==
After graduating, Hamada practiced law in Baguio City and has served as counsel for various cases that have reached the Supreme Court.

As a young lawyer, he served as the defense counsel for Cayat, an Igorot and native of Baguio, who was charged for illegal possession of a bottle of gin. At the time, it was illegal for non-Christian tribe members to "buy, receive, have in his possession, or drink any ardent spirits, ale, beer, wine, or intoxicating liquors of any kind, other than the so-called native wines and liquors". People v. Cayat (1939) is a landmark constitutional law case studied in law schools throughout the Philippines to discuss the equal protection clause and social justice.

Hamada was also petitioner to another landmark political law case, Cordillera Broad Coalition v. COA (1990), which challenged the constitutionality of President Corazon Aquino's Executive Order No. 220, which created the Cordillera Administrative Region.

Hamada also served as President of the Board of Directors of Benguet Electric Cooperative (BENECO).

== Writing career ==
On April 28, 1947, Hamada founded the Baguio Midland Courier, which started out as a four-page tabloid and is now considered one of the most widely read and distributed newspapers in Baguio. The first 100 copies bore the slogan “Fair, Fearless, Friendly, Free”. Hamada was its first and longest-lasting editor-in-chief while his older brother Oseo Hamada managed its business operations. Circa 1963, it distributed 7,500 copies around Baguio City and Cordillera Administrative Region. The newspaper's style was founded on Sinai's 1948 principle from his short story “Tanabata’s Wife”.

In 1954, Hamada joined other legal practitioners in lobbying for the right of Baguio citizens to vote for their own local officials. It was eventually granted and they were allowed to vote in the 1959 local elections.

== Personal life ==
Hamada married Geralda Macli-ing and had six children: Dorothy Margaret Hamada, agriculturist and UNDP/FAO expert; former National Commission on Indigenous Peoples Chairperson Zenaida Brigida "Bridget" Hamada-Pawid; Amelia Cynthia Hamada-Nanni, psychologist; journalist and radio host Daniel Stephen "Steve" Hamada; Lionel Edgar Hamada- journalist, and Genevieve Claire Hamada-Plank, a retired Canadian lawyer.

His granddaughter, Maxine Tanya Hamada, is a democracy activist and civil servant who served as Assistant Secretary in the Department of Budget and Management from 2014 to 2016.

== Death ==
Hamada died in September 1991 in Baguio.

== Legacy ==
Hamada is considered one of the most prominent Filipino writers during the post-war period. His work was published in the United States, considered "an important breakthrough for Filipino authors at that time."

In 1998, National Artist F. Sionil José spoke about Hamada in a Philippine PEN Conference and acknowledged his legacy as one of Baguio's most prominent writers by asking, "Is there Baguio writing after Sinai Hamada?" In a separate article, Jose wrote, "I bring to mind an old writer friend, Sinai Hamada, who wrote about his people; no Igorot has surfaced to replace him."

His short story, Tanabata's Wife, a romantic story between an Igorot woman and a Japanese farmer, was considered "the finest love story ever written by a Filipino." It was adapted into a film released in 2018. It was directed by Charlson Ong and playwright Lito Casaje and won Best Adapted Screenplay in the 2019 FAMAS Awards.

His works are still a subject of literary research and criticism in various colleges and universities in the Philippines.

== Works ==
- Collected Short Stories (1975) - Baguio, Philippines : Baguio Print. & Pub. Co.
- The Woman who Looked Out of the Window: Selected Stories - A. S. Florentino: exclusively distributed by National Book Store, 1973
- The Punishment of Kutnon
- The Pagan

== See also ==
- Philippine literature in English
- Literature of the Philippines
