= Llyan Oliver Austria =

Architect and YouTube content creator

- Born: Llyan Oliver Fernandez Austria
- Other names: Llyan Austria; Oliver Austria
- Education: Saint Louis University
- Occupations: Architect, vlogger

YouTube information
- Channel: Llyan Austria
- Years active: 2017-present
- Subscribers: 2.52 million
- Views: 134 million
- Last updated: June 7, 2024

Llyan Oliver Fernandez Austria is a Filipino architect and YouTube content creator. He is best known for his Pinoy Architect reaction videos which gained prominence during the 2020 coronavirus pandemic in the Philippines.

== Education ==
Austria graduated with an architecture course from Saint Louis University in Baguio. In 2016, Austria was ranked fifth in the Architect Licensure Examination (ALE) with an average score of 81.50%.

== YouTube career ==
In 2017, he started creating YouTube tutorials and architecture-related content under the name Llyan Austria, mostly spoken in English.

During the 2020 coronavirus pandemic in the Philippines, his Pinoy Architect reaction videos, which is mostly spoken in Filipino, uploaded in his second channel Oliver Austria gained increasing popularity after reacting to house tours of Lloyd Cadena, Mimiyuuuh, Slater Young, Team Kramer (Doug and Cheska Kramer and family), and Ivana Alawi. Due to his reaction videos, his channel suddenly reached one million subscribers on YouTube last August 16, 2020.

== Awards and nominations ==
Year	Award	Category	Note	Result	Ref
2020	CICP Spotlight Awards	Innovator of the Year	Credited as "Oliver Austria."	Won	
