= Baguio Midland Courier =

Weekly Philippines newspaper, 1947–2024

- Fair, Fearless, Friendly, Free

- The front page of the Baguio Midland Courier on July 21, 2024
- Type: Weekly newspaper
- Owner(s): Hamada Printers and Publishers Corporation
- Founder: Sinai C. Hamada
- Founded: April 28, 1947; 79 years ago
- Ceased publication: July 21, 2024
- Language: English
- Headquarters: 16 Kisad Road
- City: Baguio
- Country: Philippines
- Sister newspapers: Lowland Courier
- ISSN: 0115-9186
- OCLC number: 16251812
- Website: Official website

The Baguio Midland Courier was an English-language weekly community newspaper published by Hamada Printers and Publishers Corporation in Baguio, Philippines. It served the Cordillera and nearby regions every Sunday from 1947 to 2024. (Note: A Baguio Midland Courier issue was released once on a Wednesday (October 12, 1949) because the issue scheduled for October 9, 1949, was belatedly published.)

== History ==
=== Establishment ===
The first Baguio weekly was the Baguio Banner, the city's pioneer newspaper that was born circa 1945. Banner's proprietors entered into a joint venture with Sinai starting with a used P20,000 printing press, which printed BMC's first issues.

The 10-centavo four-page edition Baguio Midland Courier published its first issue on April 28, 1947, by its founder Sinai C. Hamada, with his brother, Oseo managing the publication. Sinai served as its longest-lasting editor-in-chief.

The newspaper's name was derived from the location of Baguio, between the highlands and lowlands of northern Luzon. An Ilocano-language counterpart, the Lowland Courier, was published in La Union during the 1970s.

=== Early years ===
The history of the Courier is closely entwined with that of its printing press, which was originally established Baguio Printers and Publishers Co., Inc. in 1946, a year before the Courier. It started out with a secondhand printing press purchased in Manila, and two platen presses purchased from the Episcopal Mission in Sagada; and the Courier was its first customer before it started accepting commercial print jobs.

The first issues were only four pages and had a print fun of only 200. The first headline involved the reopening of the Benguet Road (which would later be renamed Kennon Road) route to Baguio at the end of World War II, and some of the earliest stories were the arrival of the first batch of Philippine Military Academy (PMA) cadets for the reopening of the Philippine Military Academy, and then their later move to the new PMA campus at Camp Henry T. Allen.

Soon after the Courier was established, a private citizen named Ben Palispis bought most of the shares of Baguio Printers and Publishers Corporation. Philippine media historian Crispin Maslog notes that Palispis had "practically had full control of the corporation" for many years, even as Palispis became Mayor of Tuba, Benguet, from 1964 to 1967, and from 1986 to 1974 while he was Governor of Benguet.

The Courier was deeply involved in community advocacy work from its inception. It promoted the interest of the Cordilleran peoples and development of what would become the Cordillera Administrative Region, spoke out against squatting in the city of Baguio, advocated for the development of a water system in the city, and called for adequate public services for its citizens.

For the first 15 years of its existence, the Courier was fiscally dependent on the printing press for its continued existence. But by 1963, the Baguio Midland Courier's circulation had gone up to 7,500 sold copies in Baguio City and the Cordilleras, and its circulation would remain the highest among the printed regional newspapers in Northern Luzon throughout its lifetime.

=== Martial law era ===
The Courier itself was able to continue its publication run after President Ferdinand Marcos placed the whole country under martial law in 1972. Although some of the Courier's staff were jailed, particularly Ibaloi activist Kathleen Okubo, who became a political detainee at Camp Holmes Internment Camp (later renamed Camp Bado Dangwa). Even after her release, Okubo had to report weekly in person to her former detention center throughout the martial law years.

One of the notable changes that took place in the Courier during the earliest days of martial law was that the Hamada family bought back Governor Palispis' shares in Baguio Printers and Publishers Corporation, putting control of the Courier firmly back in the hands of the Hamada family one year after the establishment of martial law.

It was also in 1974 that the Courier purchased the La Union-based newspaper The Lowland Herald, which it then renamed The Lowland Courier. The Lowland Courier was distributed throughout the Ilocos Region, but was eventually phased out in 1983.

In 1984, Sinai and his son Stever launched his second publication, the Cordillera Post, while Oseo solely managed Midland Courier. In 2007, its website was launched, while its Facebook page had 130,000 followers.

=== Later years and closure ===
The Courier was also able to maintain its continuous publication despite the devastation of Baguio during the 1990 Luzon earthquake, and during the nationwide lockdowns resulting from the COVID-19 pandemic in the Philippines. The COVID-19 pandemic proved very difficult for the Courier, though, as the loss of ad revenue forced it to let go of some of its hours and to reduce its hours of operations.

In 2022, it had 25,000 weekly circulation.

In its June 30, 2024, issue, the publishers announced that the Baguio Midland Courier will end its operations starting July 22, 2024, attributing the closure to high publishing costs and a diminished demand in the city for traditional print media.

At its closure, its editorial board was composed of editor Harley Palangchao assisted by staff Jane Cadalig, Rimaliza Opiña, Hanna Lacsamana and Ofelia Empian, all under publisher Gloria Antoinette Hamada. Editor Harley Palangchao, a protégé of former publisher Charles Hamada, printed BMC's final edition with the last July 21 headline: "BMC wraps up 77 years of journalism excellence." The 77-year-old BGM issued its final edition on July 21, 2024.

== Archives ==
Past issues of the Baguio Midland Courier are stored in their offices with copies provided to the Ateneo de Manila University and the Philippine Press Institute, while their website contains articles published since 2007. Some of its issues from the late 1940s to the early 1950s are accessible through a digital platform hosted by the University Library, University of the Philippines Diliman.

In their closure announcement published on June 30, 2024, publishers of the Baguio Midland Courier announced that they would be looking for ways to preserve its past issues.

== Recognition ==
In 2017, the Baguio Midland Courier received numerous awards from the Philippine Press Institute (PPI) that it was elevated to the PPI's Hall of Fame. By then, it had received awards for Best Edited Weekly Newspaper five times, Best Editorial Page seven times, and Best in Science and Environment Reporting three times.
