= Gochang County =

Coordinates: 35°26′00″N 126°42′00″E

Gochang
- County
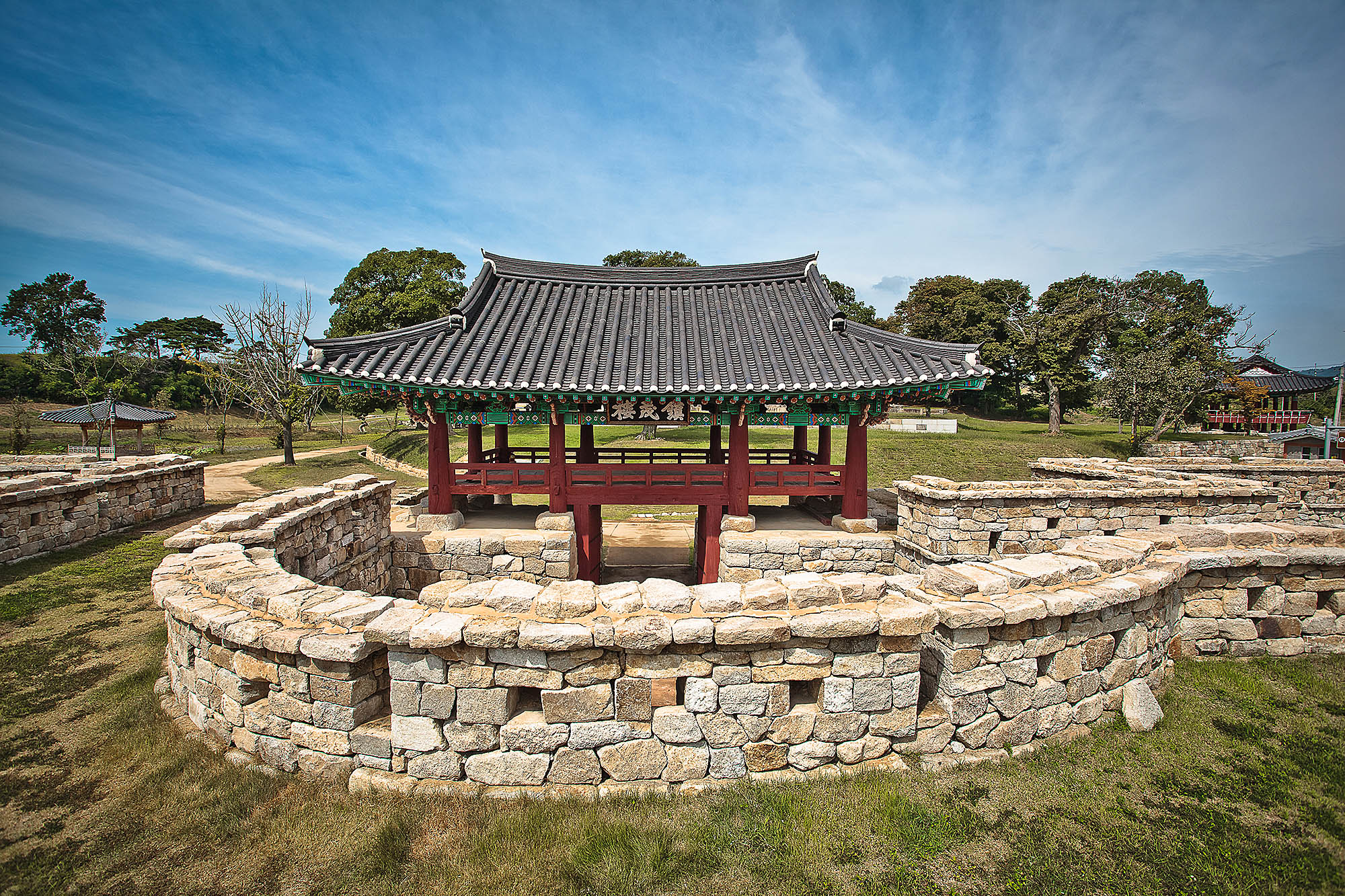
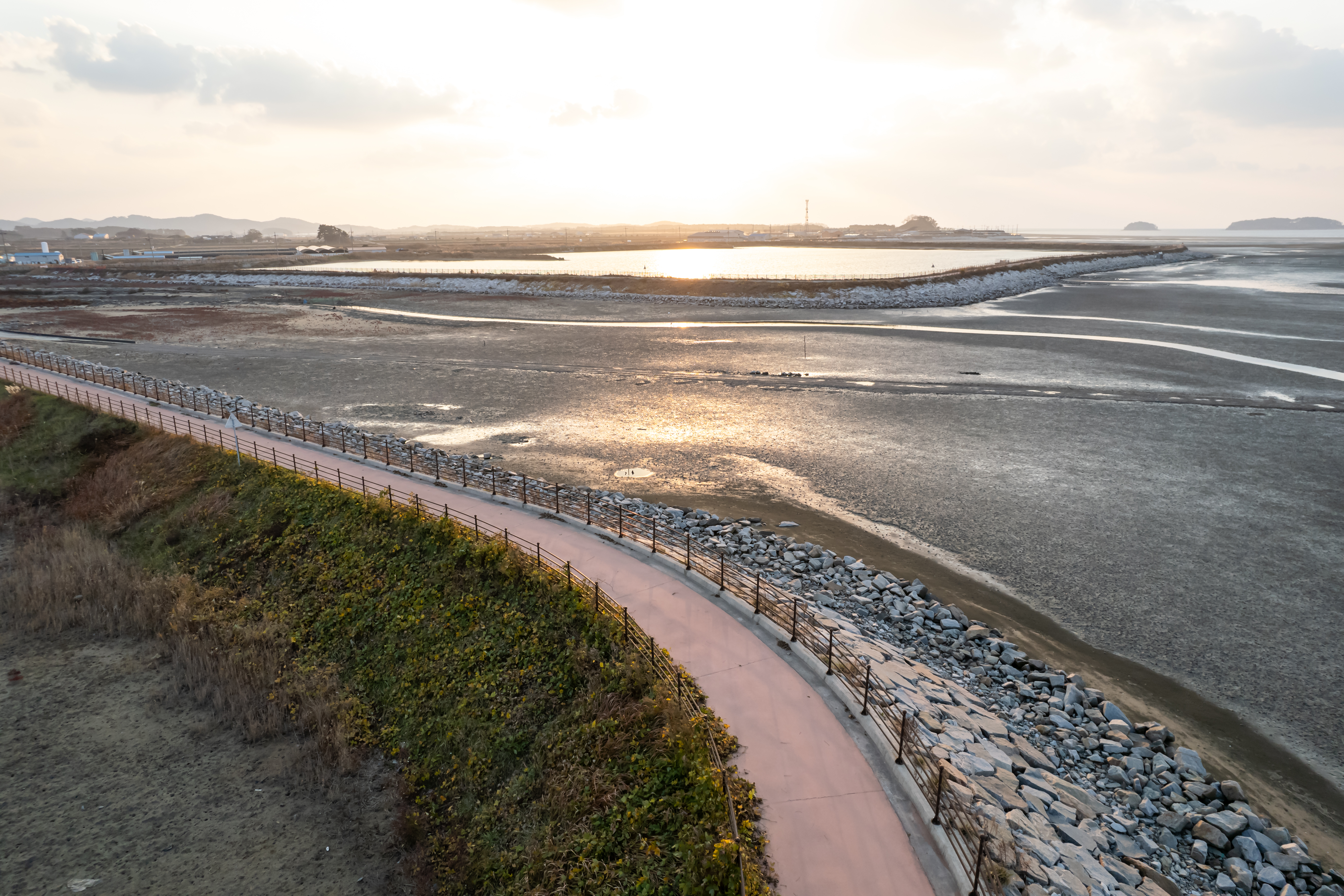

- Flag Emblem of Gochang

- Location in South Korea
- Country: South Korea
- State: Jeonbuk
- Administrative divisions: 1 eup, 13 myeon

Area
  - Total: 606.90 km^{2} (234.33 sq mi)

Population (September 2024)
  - Total: 53,151
  - Density: 88/km^{2} (230/sq mi)
  - Dialect: Jeolla

Korean name
- Hangul: 고창군
- Hanja: 高敞郡
- RR: Gochang-gun
- MR: Koch'ang-gun

Gochang County (Korean: 고창군) is a county in Jeonbuk State, South Korea. It is a rural area, and is home to only one institution of higher education: Gochang Polytechnic College.

Notable people from Gochang include the 20th-century poet Midang. The temple of Seonunsa is also located in Gochang.

The Gochang Dolmens located in Maesan village are listed as a UNESCO World Heritage site and Historic Site #391.

Gochang-gun has an average temperature of 14.3 degrees Celsius and precipitation of 1003.6 millimeters, which is a low rainfall area. The average high is 18.8 degrees and the average low is 8.01 degrees.

== History ==
Gochang is the town with the most dolmen sites in Korea. Some of the dolmens in Dosan-ri, Sanggap-ri and Maesan-ri are of the southern style, whereas most of those in the rest of North Jeolla-do Province are of the northern style. This proves that a wide scope of culture existed in the town in the prehistoric times.

Gochang is where Morobiri, one of the 54 small countries during the ancient Mahan period, was located. The town was called Moryangburi-hyeon or Moryang-hyeon in the Baekje period, then renamed as Gochanghyun in the United Kingdom of Shilla.

Notable sites in the area include the Seonunsa or Seonun Temple and the Gochangeupseong Fortress. Seonunsa Temple is one of the leading Buddhist temples in North Jeolla-do Province. It is known for camellias and has a number of Buddhist treasures such as Daeungjeon or the main building and the statue of a Buddhist saint named Jijang.

Meanwhile, Gochangeupseong Fortress is the best-preserved fortress in the country. Built in the early days of the Joseon dynasty to protect the town against Japanese invaders, the fortress has carried on the tradition of stepping on the ground of the fortress. A town named Mujang in Seongnae-ri, Mujang-myeon, also has a fortress. The south gate and mud rampart of the Mujang Town Fortress are in their original form.

Gochang is also the hometown of Jeon Bong-jun and was a major stronghold for the Tonghak rebels. Other major figures of the Tonghak Peasant Revolution like Kang Kyung-jung or Kim Heong-seob resided here during the revolution.

Part of Shin Jae-hyo's house remains near a pavilion called Gongbungnu within the Gochang Fortress. Gochang has relics of Dongjae all over a town called Ogari Dangsan, Sadong, Gosu-myeon, which used to be a home for the production of ceramics from celadon porcelains of the Goryeo dynasty to white porcelains of the Chosun dynasty and throughout the Japanese colonial period. Sudong-ri, Buan-myeon has a bunching production site. This is a specific type of porcelain. This place has been designated as a historic site as well. Bongan-ri, Buan-myeon, has Kim Seong-su's house. The design is a typical house of wealthy families in the region.

Dolmens

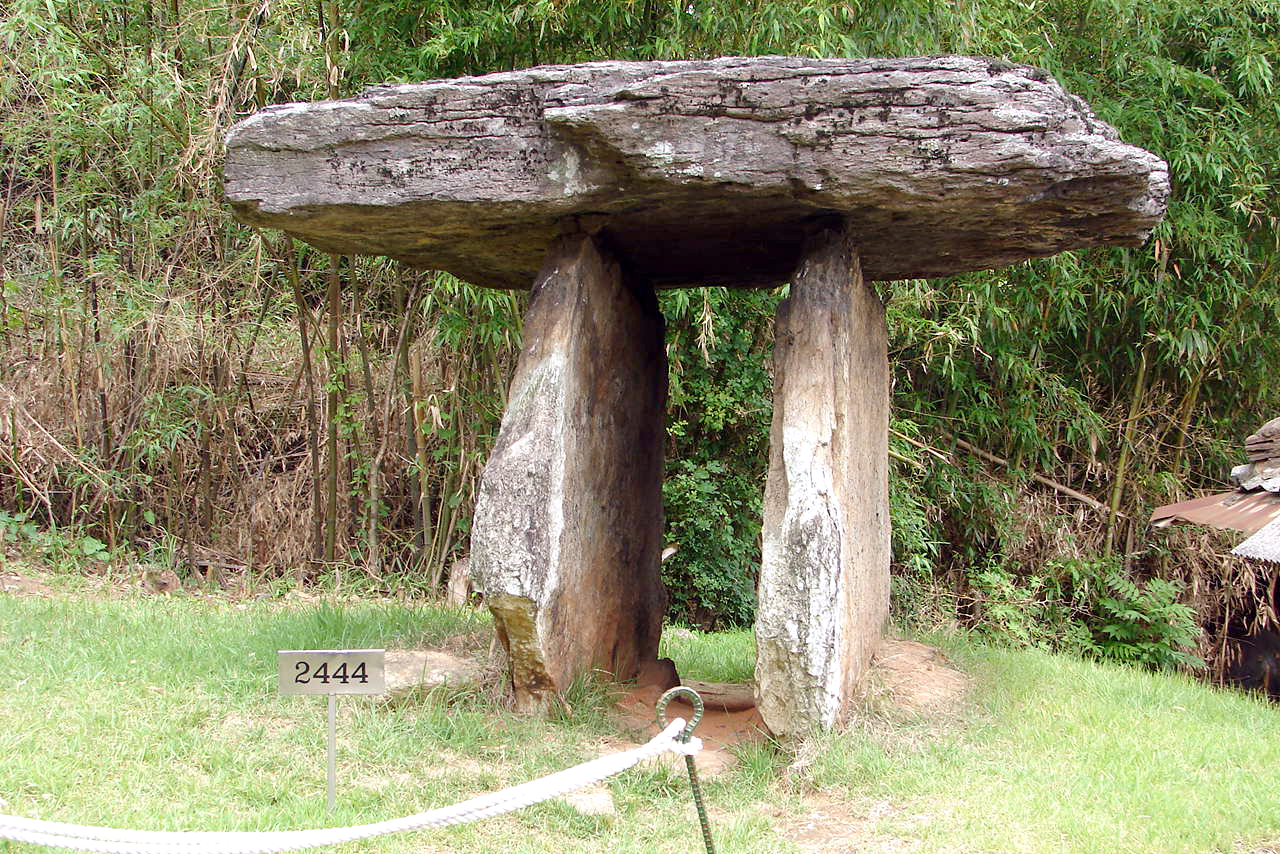
In Maesan village

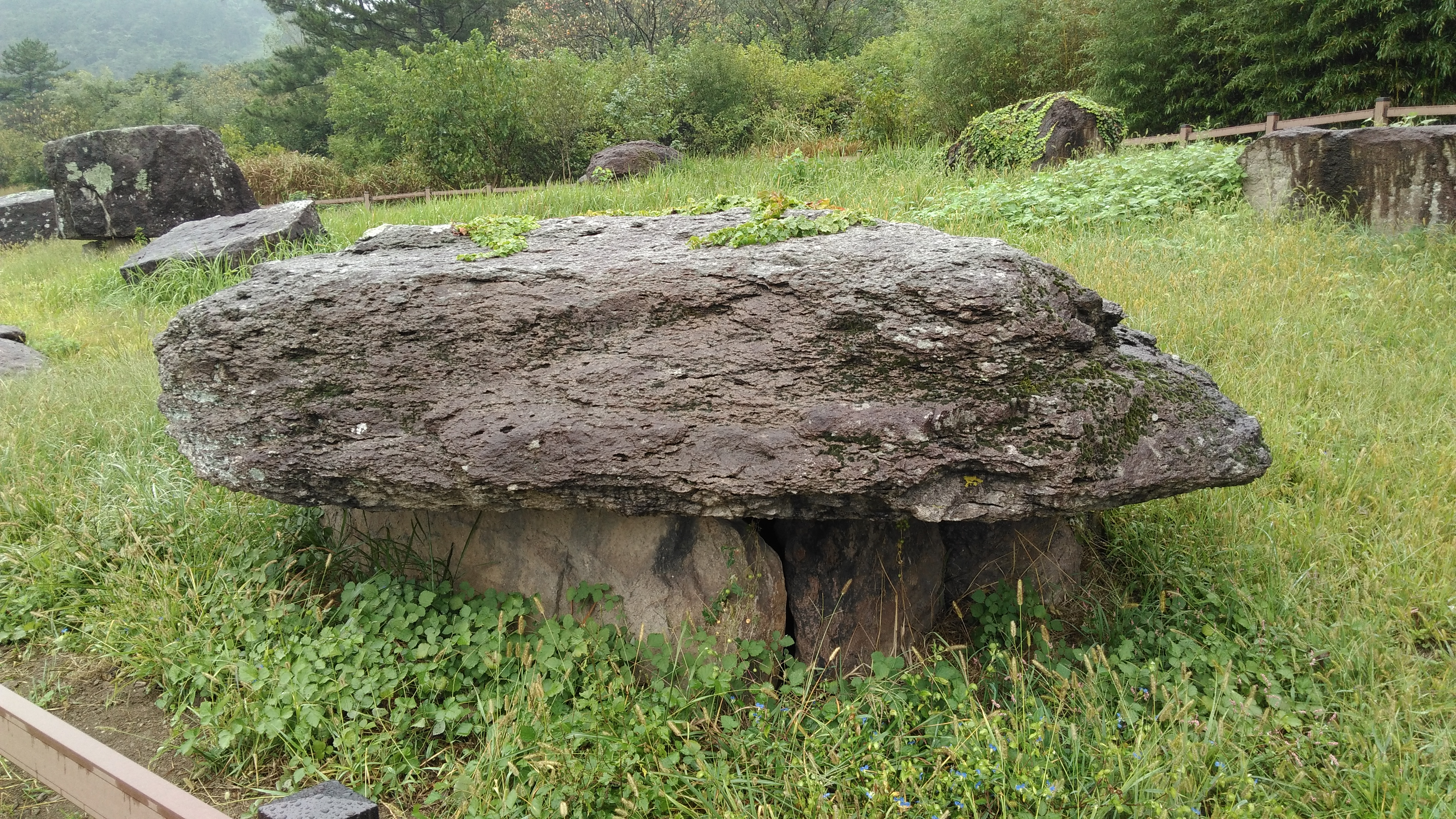

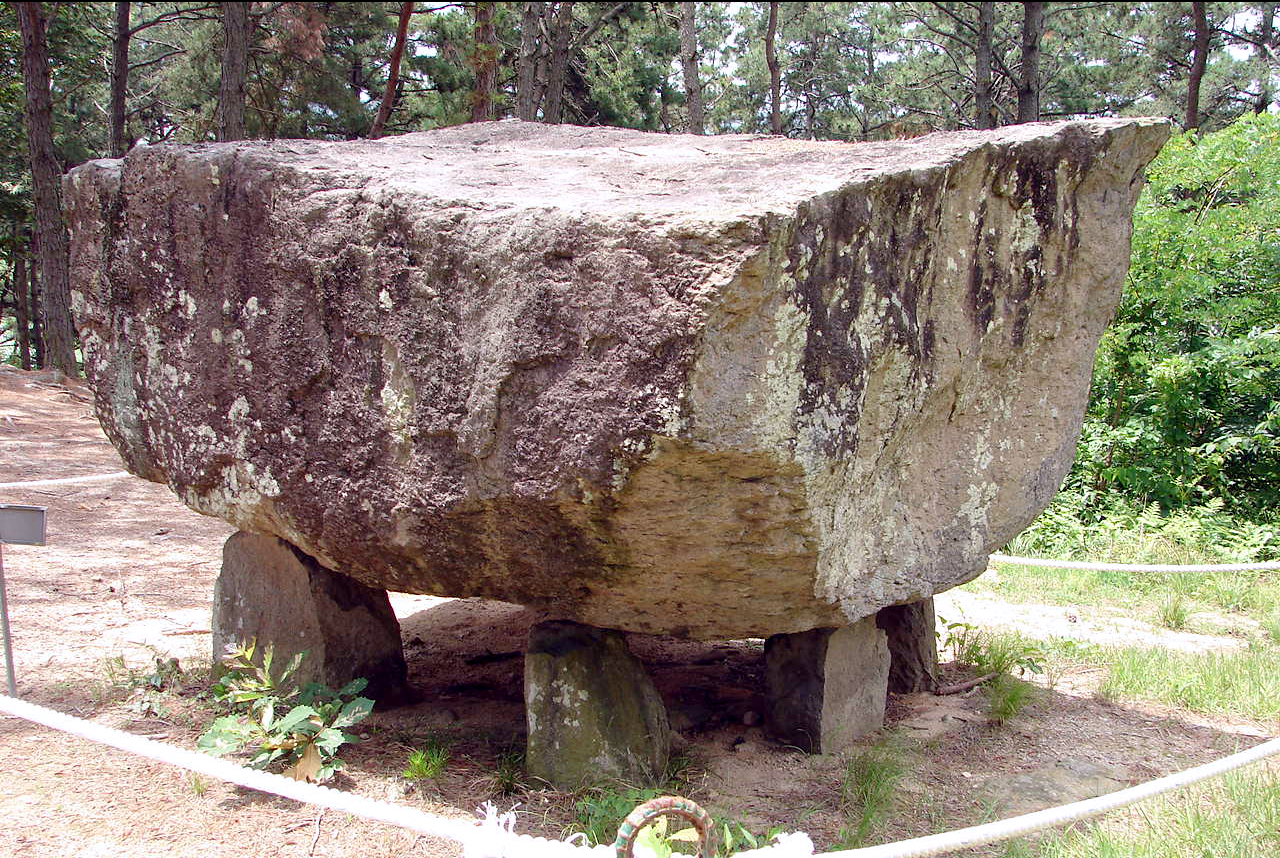
In Maesan village

== Festival ==
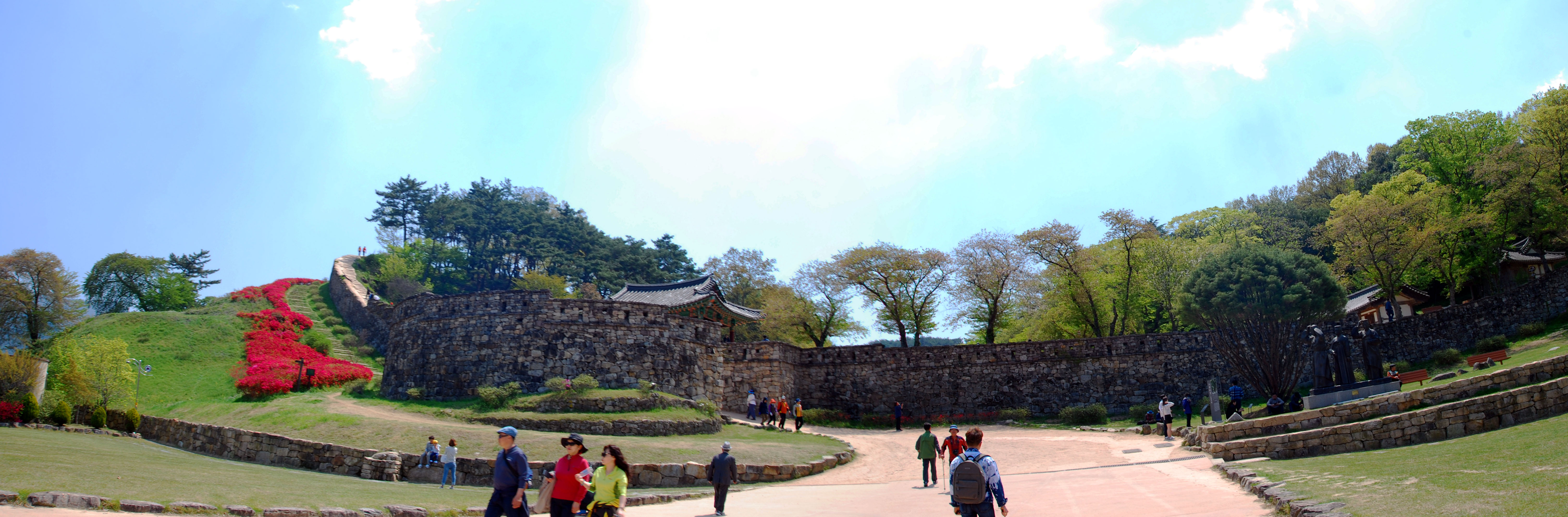
Gochangeupseong Fortress

Gochang Moyang Fortress Festival

Gochang-eup Fortress (Moyang Fortress) was built to prevent invasion from other countries in the first year of King Danjong's reign during the Joseon dynasty (1453) with the cooperation of the people of 21 towns (hyeon) in then Jeolla-do and Jeju-do. This is the natural stone fortress whose prototype has been preserved the best condition in Korea.

Among many legends and customs related with the construction of Moyang Fortress, the most famous one is Dapseong folklore game. People walk along the 1,684m-long fortress with a palm-sized stone on head. It was based on our ancestor's wisdom that walking around the fortress makes the ground stronger and can be used in emergency situations. It has been said that you can heal your leg illness for one round of walking around the fortress, live healthy and long for two rounds and go to the heaven for three rounds. Every year many people participate in the folklore game.

Green Barley Field Festival

The Green Barley Field Festival is held at Hagwon Farm in Gongeum-myeon, Gochang-gun from mid-April to mid-May every year.

The vast barley field has become widely known among photographers and travelers. The increasing number of tourists to the place requires the administration to be involved to keep order, address inconveniences and introduce the local culture. Such necessity made the local people and the Gochang-gun Office go into negotiation to host the festival since 2004.

It is the first barley-themed scenic agricultural festival on a low hill. The landscape created by the barley field attracts hundreds of thousands of visitors every year.

Visitors can have various experiences including walking in the barley field, making traditional food with barley, making barley flute and folk play such as walking on a rope, tuho and Korean jumping.

Visitors can taste barley-based boiled rice, rice cake, traditional snack and pepper paste and enjoy various cultural performances and traditional performances. During the festival, exhibitions including international scenic agricultural photo exhibition and international academic conventions on tourism and agriculture are held. And along with barley, special products of Gochang such as mountain berry are traded in the festival.

Mountain Berry and Watermelon Festival

Gochang hosts mountain berry and watermelon festival in mid June every year. During the festival period, visitors can get a special discount for mountain berry and watermelon. Visitors can taste various products such as mountain berry beverage and liquor, processed mountain berry foods such as traditional snack and jelly and watermelon salads. And they can enjoy various experience programs such as Korean chamber pot curling, mountain berry archery and watermelon shooting.

The festival features Pungcheon eel tasting, traditionally paired with mountain berry liquor, alongside eel-catching events.

== Climate ==
Climate data for Gochang (2011–2020 normals, extremes 2008–present)
Month	Jan	Feb	Mar	Apr	May	Jun	Jul	Aug	Sep	Oct	Nov	Dec	Year
Record high °C (°F)	17.3 (63.1)	22.1 (71.8)	27.3 (81.1)	28.9 (84.0)	34.2 (93.6)	33.5 (92.3)	36.6 (97.9)	37.7 (99.9)	36.1 (97.0)	31.6 (88.9)	27.8 (82.0)	19.7 (67.5)	37.7 (99.9)
Mean daily maximum °C (°F)	4.5 (40.1)	7.0 (44.6)	12.6 (54.7)	18.4 (65.1)	24.3 (75.7)	27.2 (81.0)	29.7 (85.5)	30.8 (87.4)	26.4 (79.5)	21.0 (69.8)	14.4 (57.9)	6.6 (43.9)	18.6 (65.5)
Daily mean °C (°F)	0.0 (32.0)	1.8 (35.2)	6.3 (43.3)	11.9 (53.4)	17.9 (64.2)	22.0 (71.6)	25.6 (78.1)	26.3 (79.3)	21.0 (69.8)	14.8 (58.6)	9.1 (48.4)	2.1 (35.8)	13.2 (55.8)
Mean daily minimum °C (°F)	−4.4 (24.1)	−2.8 (27.0)	0.6 (33.1)	6.0 (42.8)	12.2 (54.0)	18.0 (64.4)	22.6 (72.7)	22.8 (73.0)	16.6 (61.9)	9.5 (49.1)	4.2 (39.6)	−2.0 (28.4)	8.6 (47.5)
Record low °C (°F)	−18.1 (−0.6)	−15.6 (3.9)	−5.2 (22.6)	−2.3 (27.9)	3.0 (37.4)	10.6 (51.1)	16.2 (61.2)	15.1 (59.2)	7.7 (45.9)	−0.5 (31.1)	−5.4 (22.3)	−12.9 (8.8)	−18.1 (−0.6)
Average precipitation mm (inches)	31.1 (1.22)	33.1 (1.30)	47.0 (1.85)	83.8 (3.30)	69.6 (2.74)	89.0 (3.50)	284.6 (11.20)	285.2 (11.23)	123.8 (4.87)	76.1 (3.00)	59.1 (2.33)	43.1 (1.70)	1,225.5 (48.25)
Average precipitation days (≥ 0.1 mm)	11.2	8.3	7.1	9.7	8.0	8.4	14.8	13.2	9.4	6.2	9.5	13.9	119.7
Average relative humidity (%)	77.7	74.6	72.8	73.5	75.0	82.3	86.6	85.1	84.6	80.0	77.8	77.5	79.0
Mean monthly sunshine hours	149.9	155.8	220.9	217.3	243.2	179.5	150.6	184.0	177.3	199.1	145.6	133.2	2,156.4
Source: Korea Meteorological Administration

== Twin towns – sister cities ==
Gochang is twinned with:

- Gwanak-gu, South Korea
- Seongbuk-gu, South Korea
- Dongnae-gu, South Korea
- Sangju, South Korea

== See also ==
- Geography of South Korea
