= Sorokdo =

Island and former leper colony in South Korea

Coordinates: 34°30′N 127°07′E

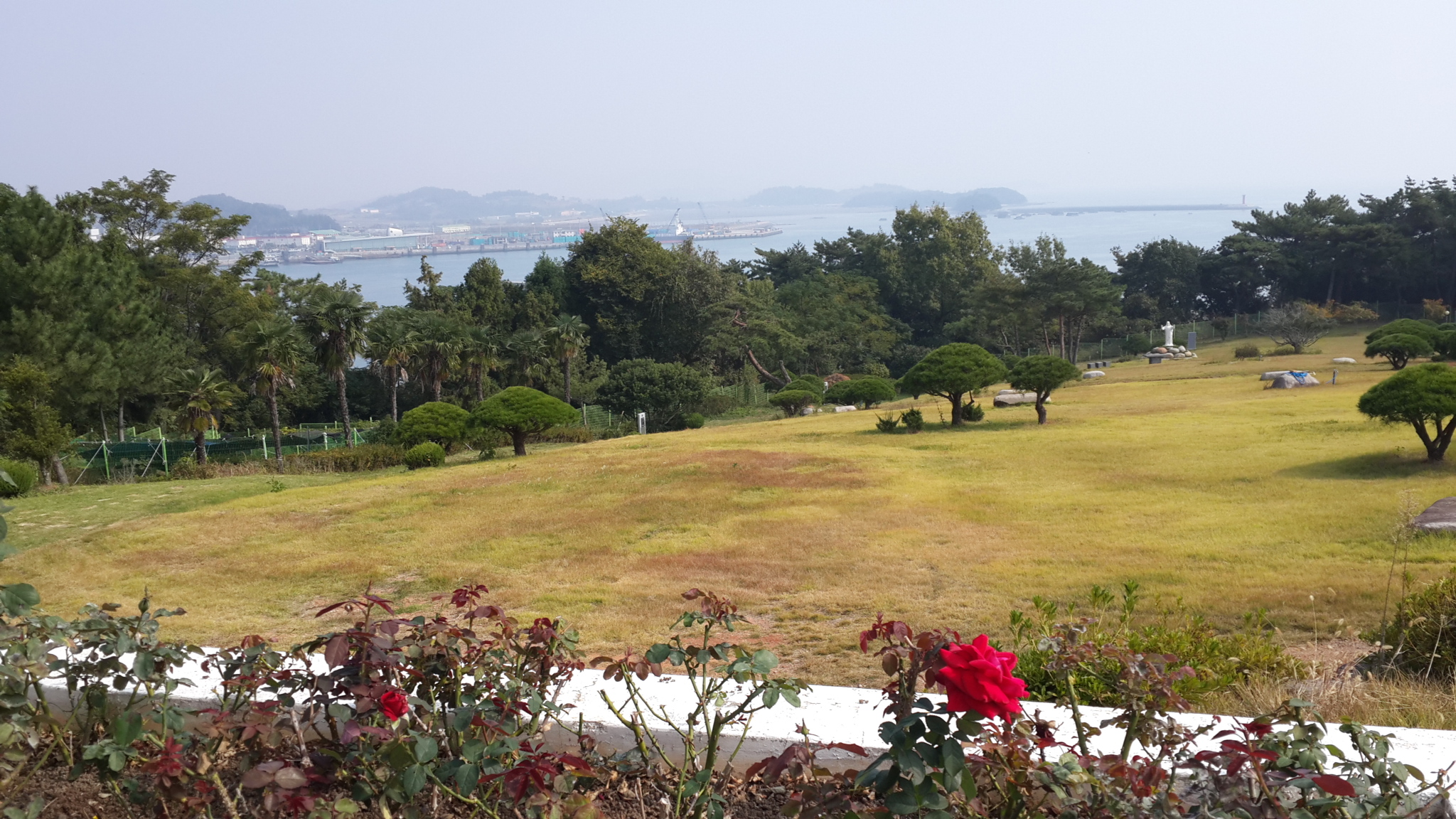
- Interactive map of Sorokdo
- Country: South Korea
- Region: Jeolla

Area
  - Total: 4.46 km^{2} (1.72 sq mi)

Population (2020)
  - Total: 708

Korean name
- Hangul: 소록도
- Hanja: 小鹿島
- RR: Sorokdo
- MR: Sorokto

Sorokdo (Korean: 소록도, lit. 'Sorok Island') is an island in Goheung County, South Jeolla in South Korea. The word sorok means "small deer", which the island's coastline, viewed from above, is supposed to resemble. The island is approximately one kilometer away from the larger Nokdong Port.

== History ==
Prior to Japanese colonization, Sorokdo had a population of roughly 1000 people living in 170 households.

Sorokdo is the site of the largest leper colony in South Korea, housed in Sorokdo National Hospital. The hospital was built in 1916, then known as Sorokdo Charity Clinic. Established during the Japanese colonization of Korea, the hospital and the island were turned into a concentration camp for lepers, with a history of patient abuse including slave labor, forced sterilizations, unethical human experimentation, and deliberate starvation. The Japanese authorities divided the island geographically - the eastern portion was a zone for non-patients, i.e. hospital staff and their families, while the western area was used to isolate patients. The dividing line between the two was referred to as sutanjang, meaning 'place of sadness'. Patients were allowed to see their families once a month, but were forced to remain at a distance as the disease was believed to be airborne.

At its peak in 1940, 6,000 patients with Hansen's disease resided on the island. Following the end of Japanese rule, the South Korean government continued to quarantine people with leprosy on Sorokdo until 1963.

In 1962, two Catholic Austrian nurses, Margaritha Pissarek and Marianne Stoeger, arrived at Sorokdo to provide treatment for patients and help establish community facilities, such as childcare centers. In 1984 Pope John Paul II visited the island; this was considered a watershed moment in the consideration of the human rights of the remaining patients and residents.

The Japanese colonial law regarding the quarantine of lepers remained in effect in South Korean until 1991; the South Korean government continued to send lepers to Sorokdo National Hospital and seven leper villages remained on the island as of 2007.

== Present day ==
In 2009, the Sorokdo bridge opened, connecting the island to the mainland and the neighboring island of Geogeum. Prior to the bridge's opening, formerly infected people were required to show permission from a doctor to take the ferry to leave the island. The Sorokdo National Hospital predominantly treats patients with dementia, and the island sees roughly 300,000 tourists per year.

Sorokdo National Hospital Hansen’s Disease Museum was designated as a national specialized museum by the Ministry of Culture, Sports, and Tourism in 2019.

In 1935, Japanese authorities forced patients to build a Shinto shrine to mandate Shinto worship as part of the Japanese assimilationist policy naisen ittai (Japanese: 内鮮一体). Still standing on the island, it is one of the last remaining Shinto shrines left in South Korea. Other religious buildings, including Catholic and Protestant churches as well as Buddhist temples, have been built on the island.

=== In films ===
Portions of the 2016 film Dongju: The Portrait of a Poet were filmed on Sorokdo.
