= Mandaue City Central School =

Public elementary school in Mandaue, Philippines

- Central
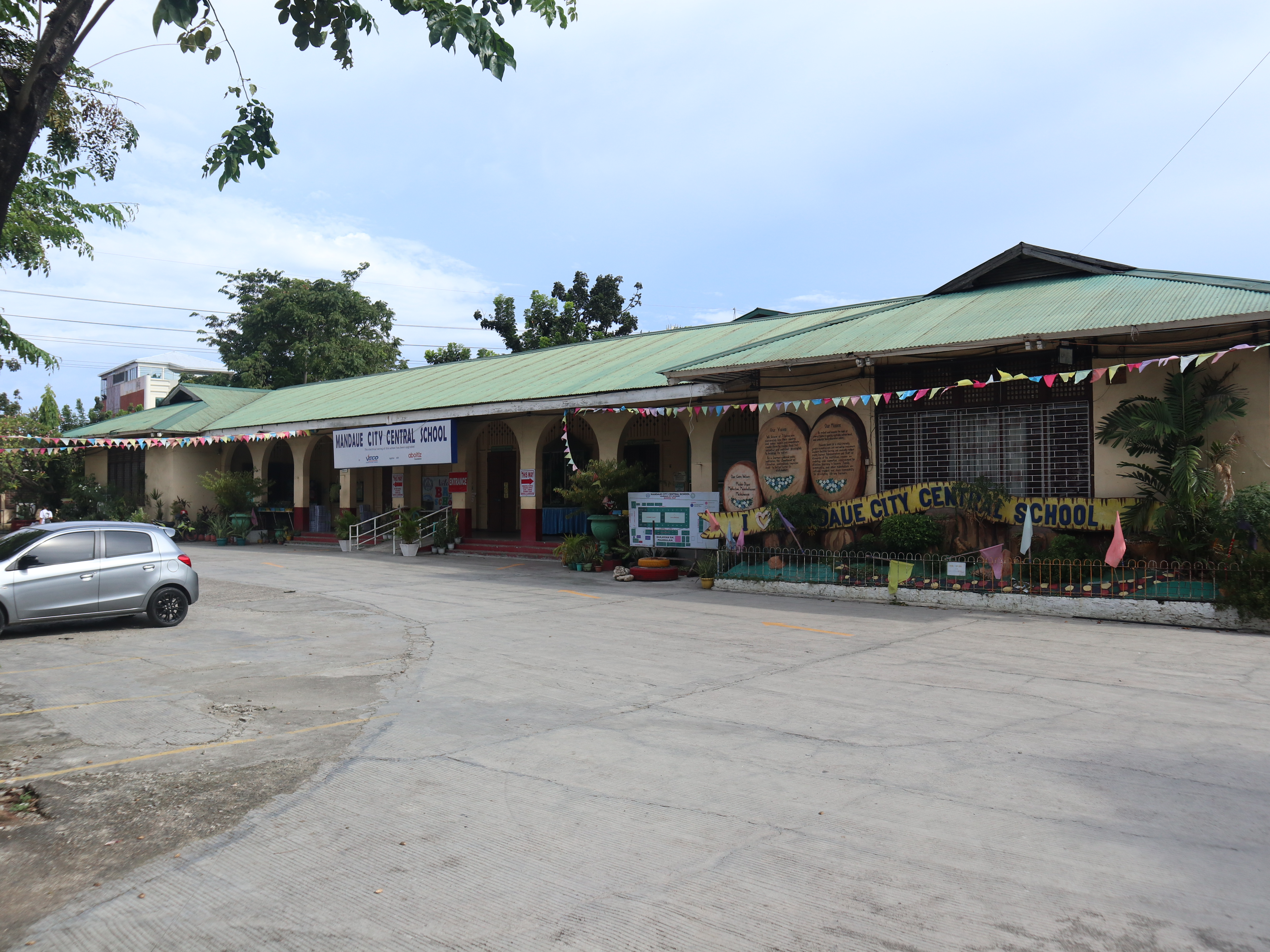
- Caravan at Mandaue City Central School

Location
- Mandaue City, Cebu; Philippines
- Coordinates: 10°19′33″N 123°56′39″E

Information
- Type: Public, Nonsectarian, elementary school, DepEd
- Established: 1935
- Principal: Claribel P. Colipapa
- Nickname: Central
- Website: mandaueccs.smartschools.ph

Mandaue City Central School is the oldest school in Mandaue City in the Philippines. It occupies a school site with an area of more than 20,000 square meters. It is located along C. Ouano Street in central Mandaue City, and belongs to the Central District. For several decades, Mandaue City Central School stood as the only school in the Central District until three new schools were established in the 1990s. The oldest building, Gabaldon Building, was built in 1904.

== History ==
Mandaue City Central School is the oldest public school in Mandaue City, and the only remaining Gabaldon School in the region.
