= Gabaldon School Buildings =

Heritage school buildings in the Philippines

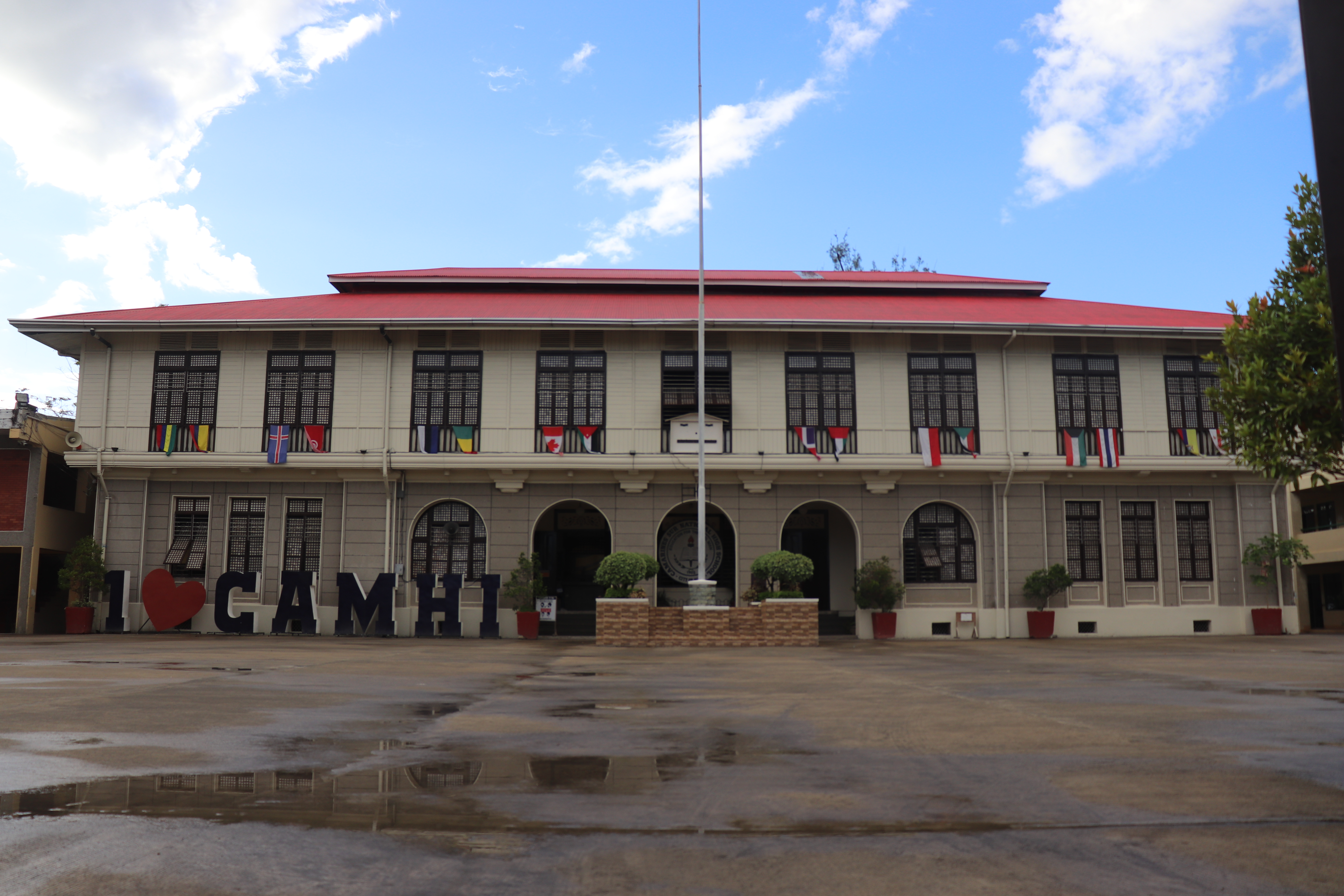
- Camarines Sur National High School in Naga, Camarines Sur
- Alternative names: Gabaldons
- Etymology: Isauro Gabaldón, author of Act No. 1801 also known as the Gabaldon Law

General information
- Type: School buildings
- Architectural style: American colonial, Bahay na bato
- Location: Philippines

Design and construction
- Architect: William E. Parsons

The Gabaldon School Buildings, or simply the Gabaldons, were built during the American colonial era in the Philippines. They were inspired by the bahay kubo and bahay na bato, traditional houses of the Philippines. As of about 2024, there were 2,045 Gabaldon Schoolhouses in the country.

== History ==
In 1907, the Philippine Assembly passed the Gabaldon Law (Act No. 1801), written by Isauro Gabaldón. The law provided ₱1 million for the construction of public schools from 1908 to 1915.

== Design and construction ==
The Gabaldons were built by the American colonial Insular Government of the Philippine Islands. To aid in the swift construction of schools 20 prototype "standard plans" were designed by American architect William E. Parsons. Building shapes were either straight, L-shaped or U-shaped with courtyards in front or in the middle.

The school buildings were executed in three styles:

- Barrio school style- made of lighter materials such as hardwood frames, nipa or grass roofs and/ or bamboo walls and floors, which were meant to be temporary.
- Municipal school style- made of more durable materials such as concrete and hardwood floors, with large capiz windows and ironwork grill ornamentation, and corrugated sheet roofing. Usually a raised bungalow.
- High School building style- made of the same materials of the Municipal school style, usually two storeys.

The buildings are contemporary in design for the time with elements drawn from the bahay kubo and bahay na bato architecture.

Barrio style Gabaldon Building	Standard plan no. 3 style Gabaldon building in Santo Tomas, Batangas	Standard plan no. 7 style Gabaldon building in San Pablo, Laguna

== Preservation ==
From January 18, 2019, the Gabaldons are protected under the Gabaldon School Buildings Conservation Act (Republic Act No. 11194) signed by President Rodrigo Duterte. Under the law, the "modification, alteration, destruction, demolition or relocation" of Gabaldon buildings is illegal, and local government units must protect and conserve of such buildings under their jurisdiction.

The Gabaldons are further protected by being designated cultural properties under National Cultural Heritage Act of 2009.

== Gallery ==
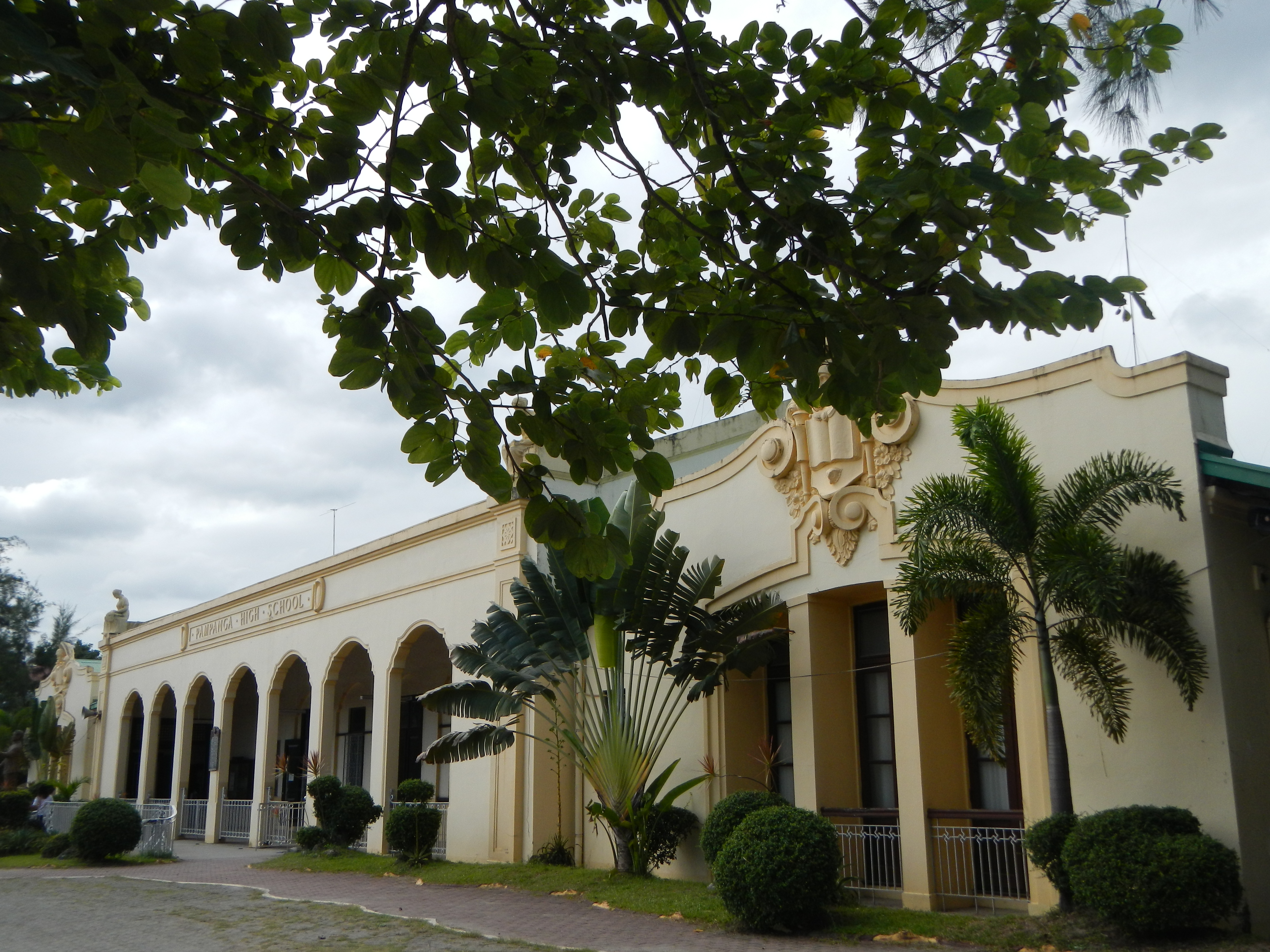
Pampanga High School

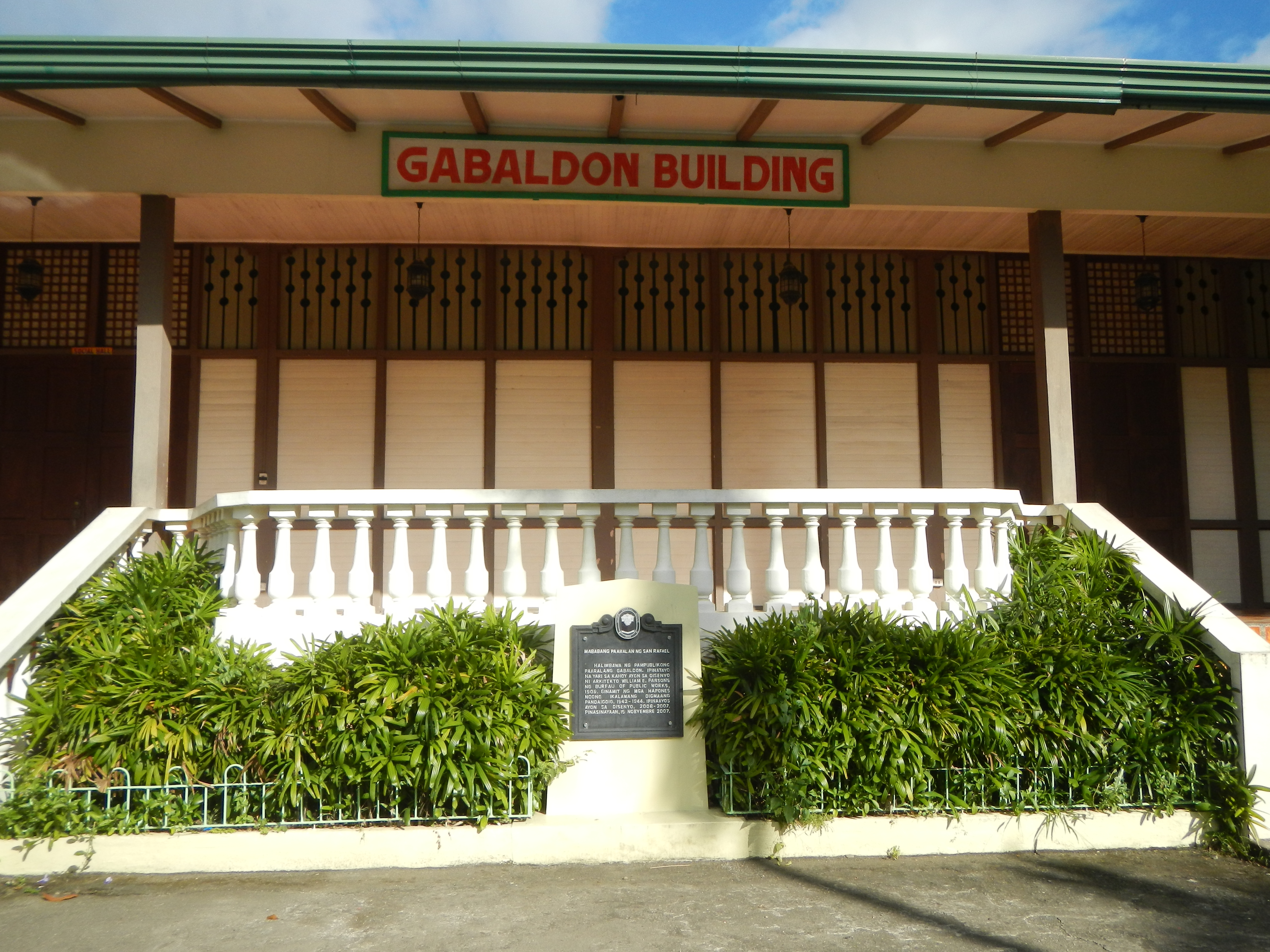
In San Rafael, Bulacan

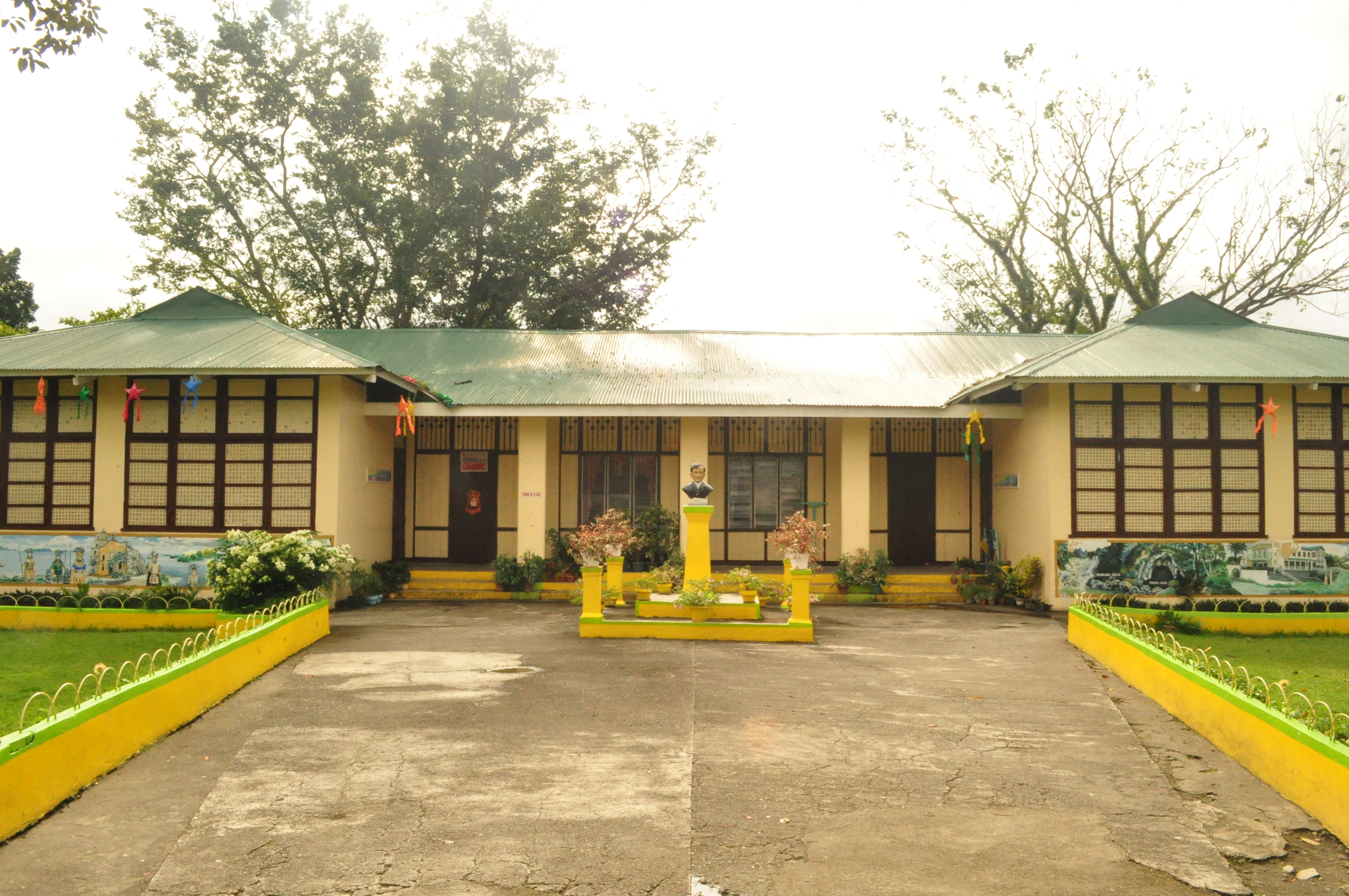
In Boac, Marinduque

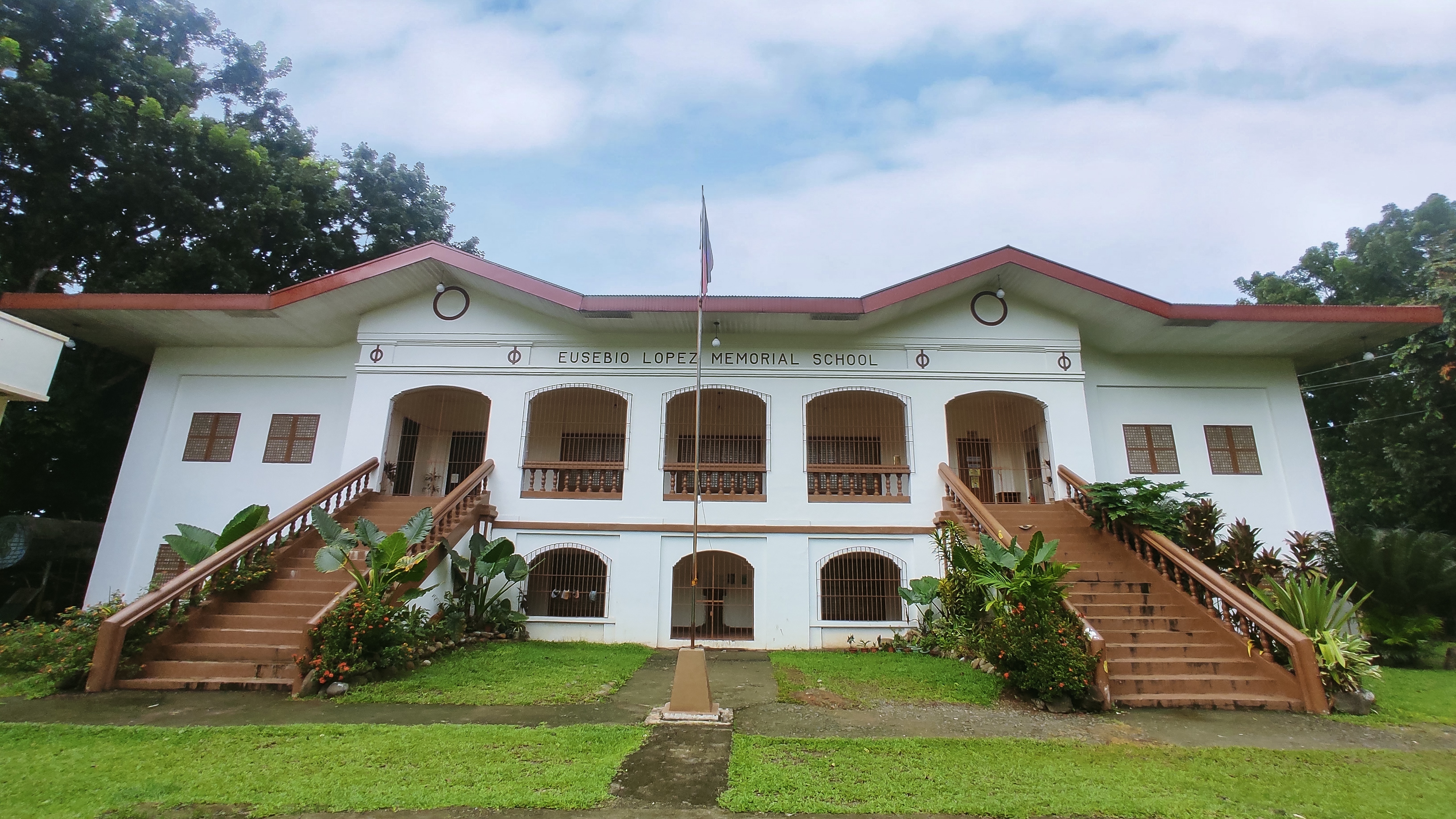
Eusebio Lopez Memorial School in Sagay, Negros Occidental

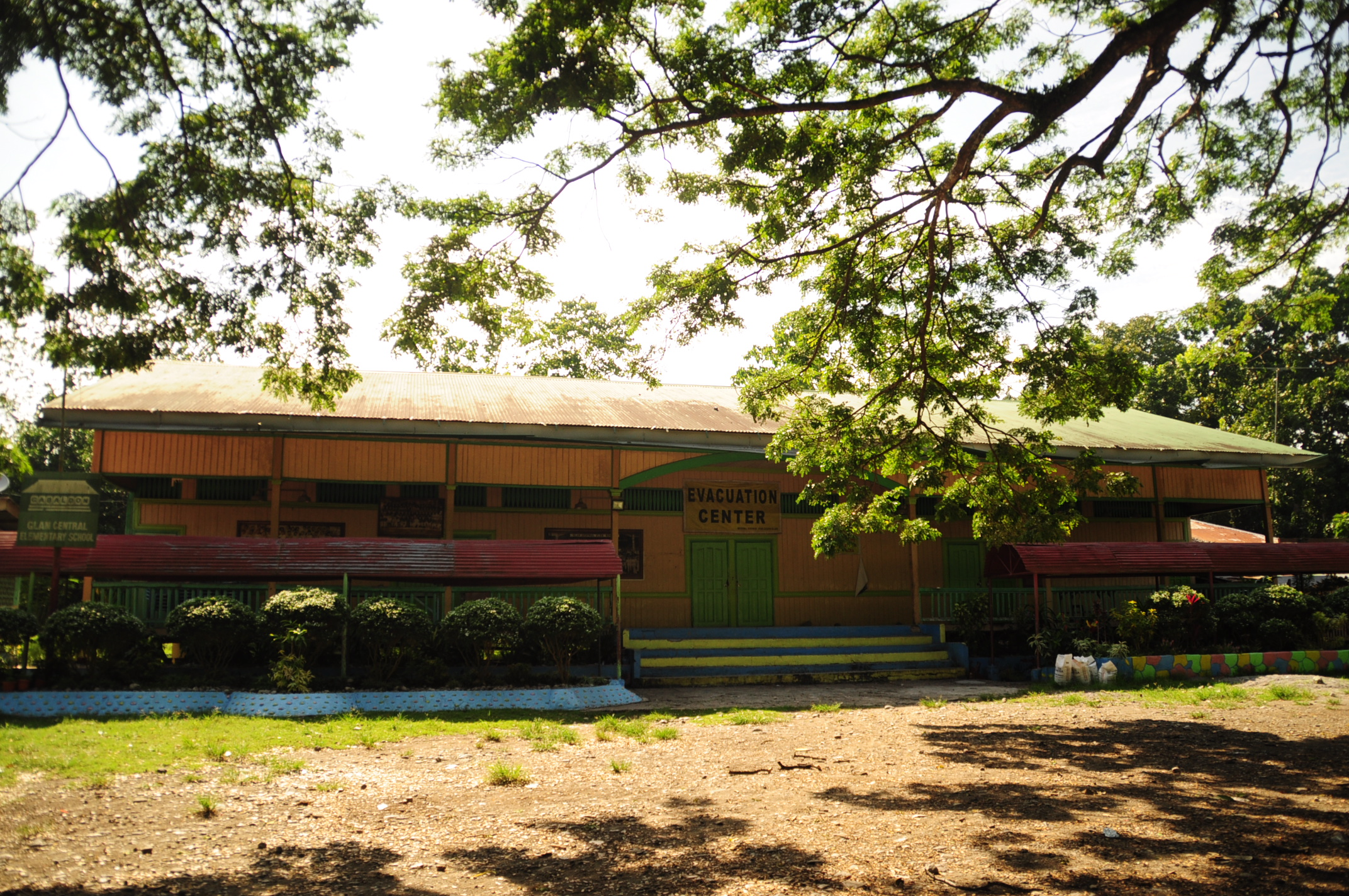
In Glan, Sarangani

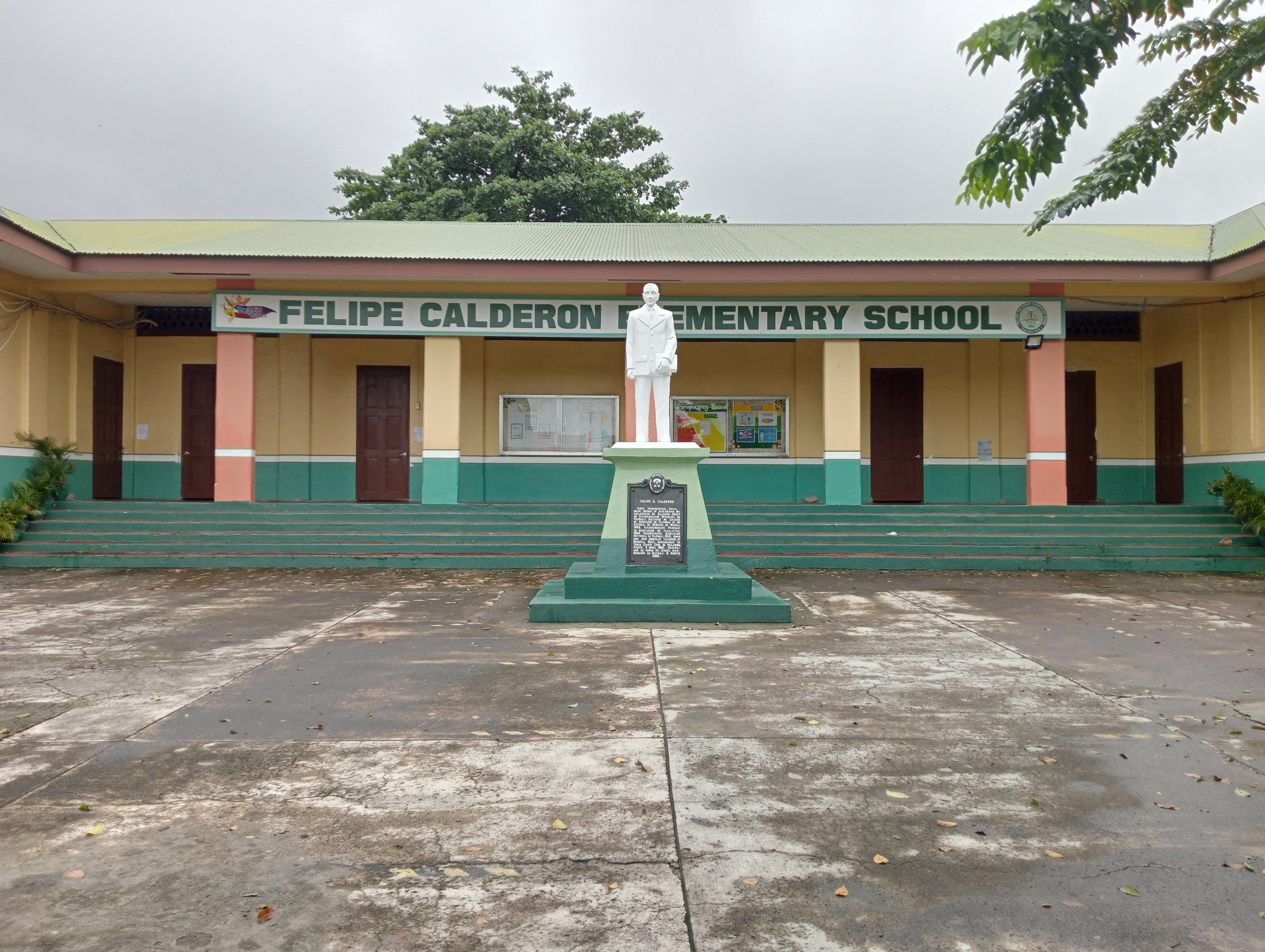
Felipe Calderon Elementary School in Tanza, Cavite

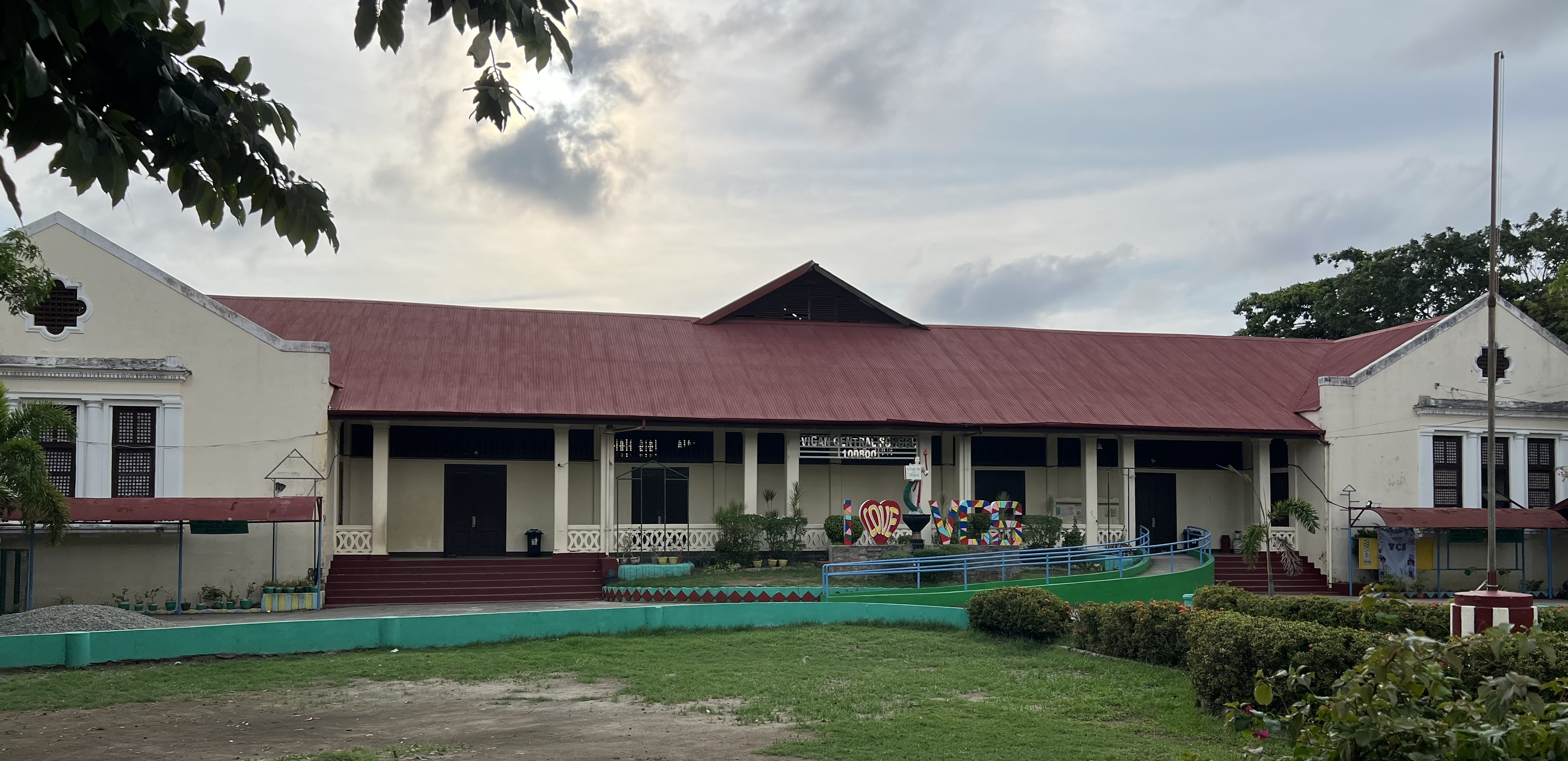
Vigan Central School in Vigan City, Ilocos Sur

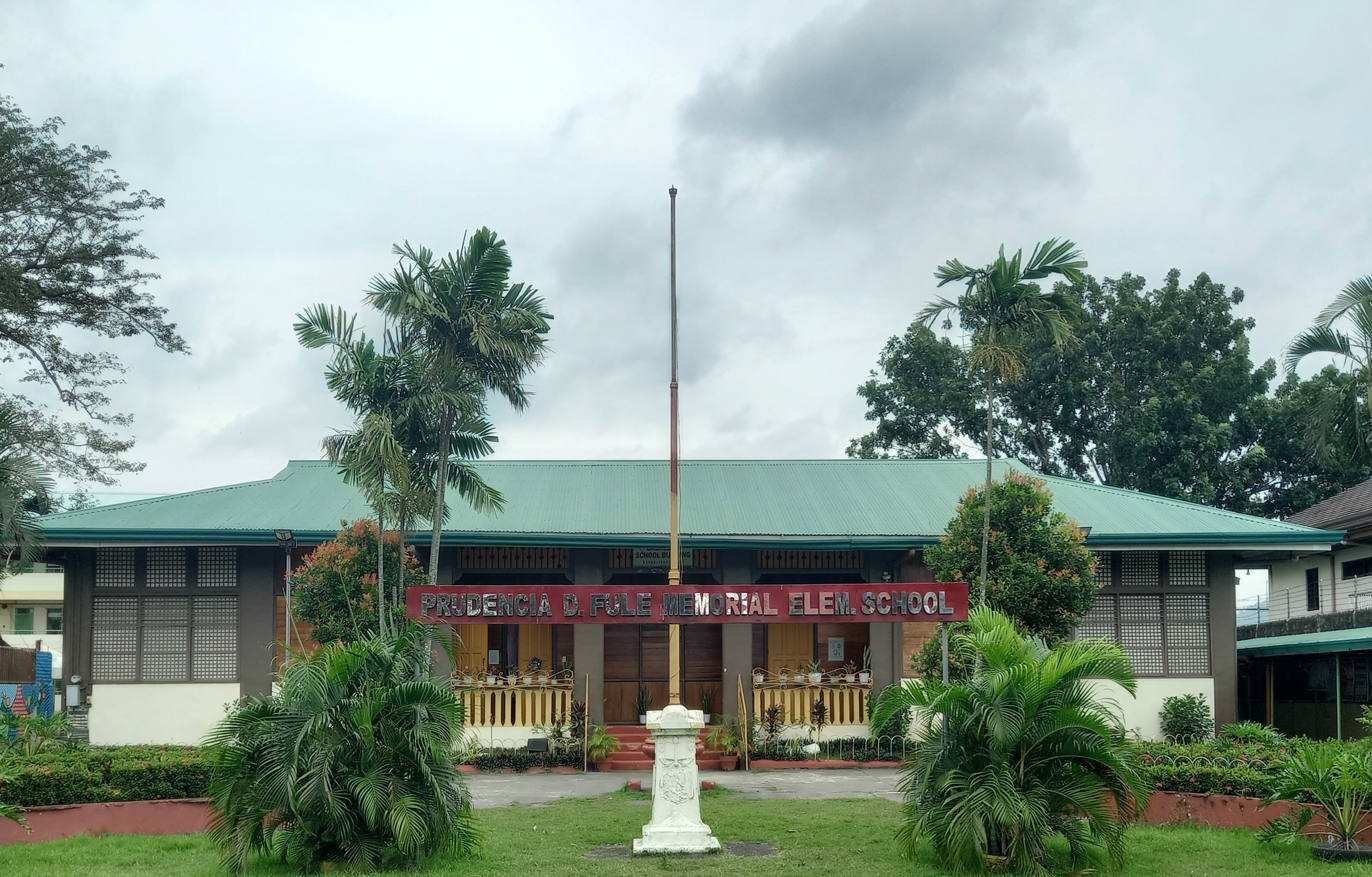
Prudencia D. Fule Memorial Elementary school in San Pablo, Laguna
