= William E. Parsons =

American architect and designer of the Gabaldon school buildings

William Edward Parsons
- Born: June 17, 1872; Akron, Ohio
- Died: December 17, 1939 (aged 67); New Haven, Connecticut
- Education: Yale University and École des Beaux-Arts
- Occupations: Architect and city planner

William Edward Parsons (June 19, 1872 – December 17, 1939) was an American architect and city planner known for his work in the Philippines during the early period of American colonial period. He was a consulting architect to the Insular Government of the Philippine Islands from 1905 to 1914, and designed various structures, most notably the Gabaldon school buildings.

== Biography ==
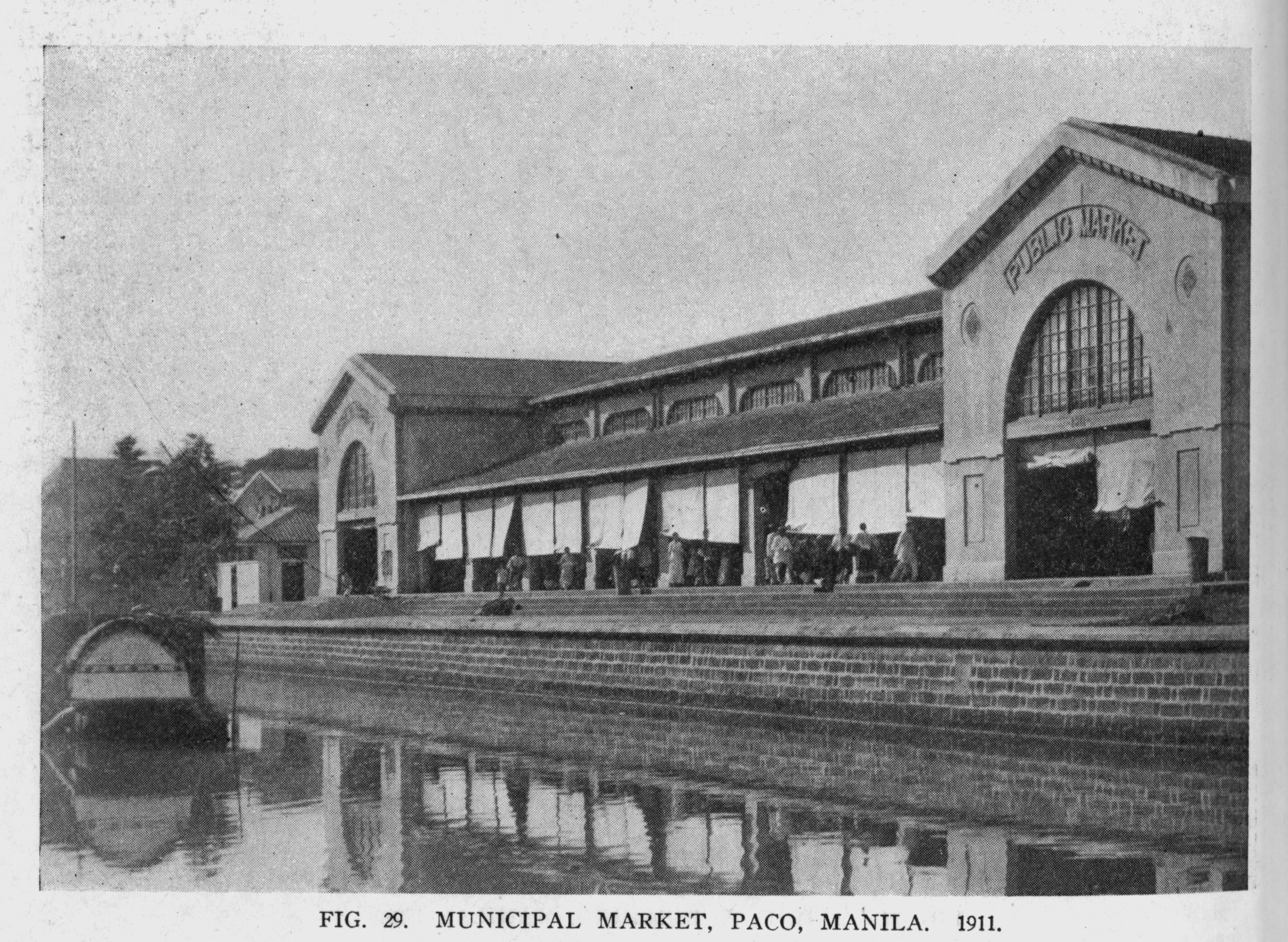
Paco Market

Parsons was born in June 1872 in Akron, Ohio. (Note: His tombstone uses June 19, 1872; likely the baptismal date. June 17, 1872 comes from the transcription of Ohio Births and Christenings, 1821–1962. The discrepancy may have been a transcription error.) He was educated at Yale University and École des Beaux-Arts in Paris.

During the early years of the American colonial era, Governor-General of the Philippines Howard Taft favored a comprehensive building construction and city planning in the country. William Cameron Forbes, having recently appointed as commissioner to the Philippines, sought out Daniel Burnham to create plans for the cities of Baguio and Manila. Burnham and architect Pierce Anderson drew up preliminary plans based from site surveys in 1904 and 1905, free of charge on Burnham's end. The plans were followed by a recommendation of a well-trained architect for the government's plan, as Burnham ended his involvement on the plans in the Philippines.

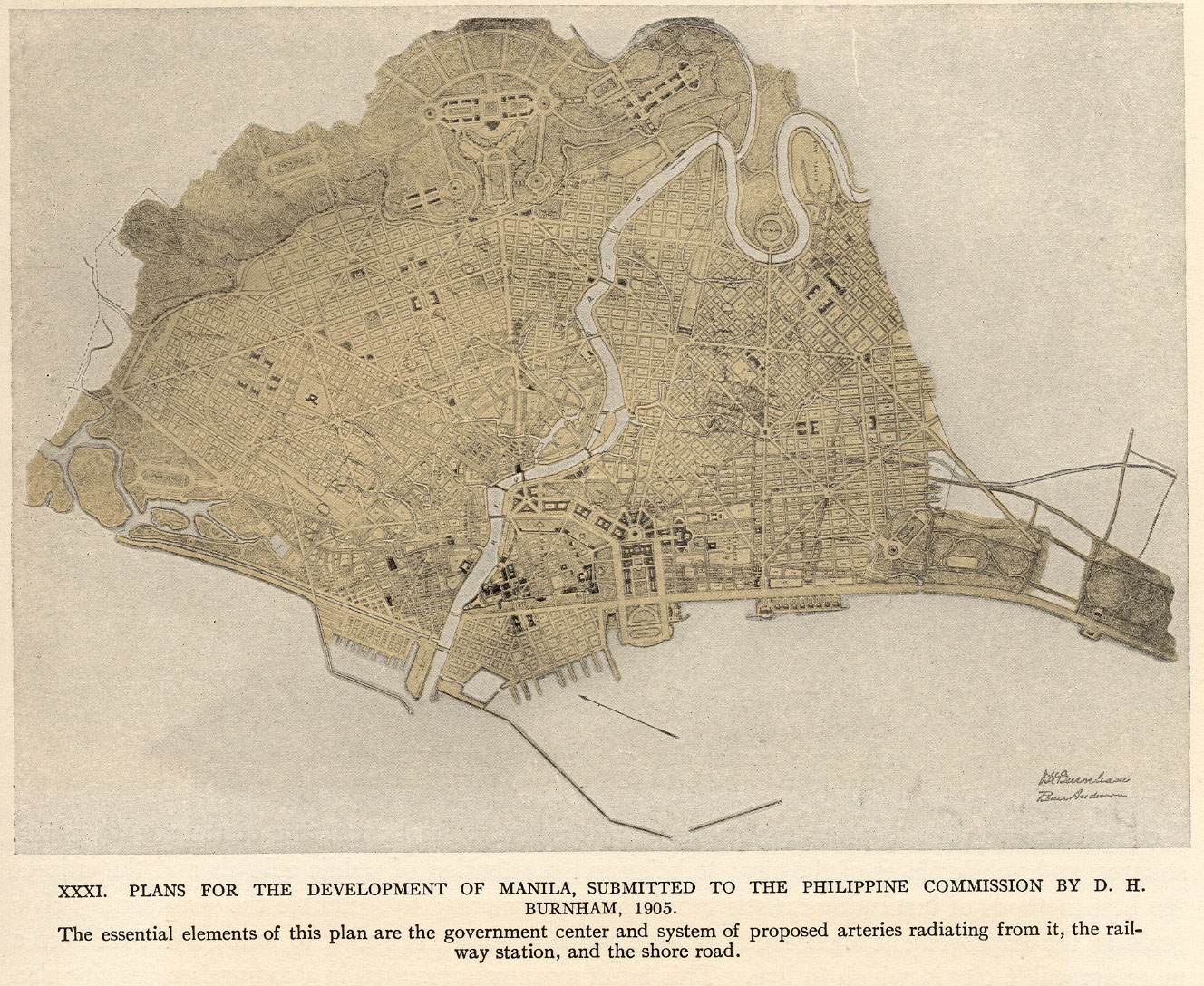
Burnham's preliminary plan for Manila, which was partially applied in the city.

Parsons was recommended by Burnham for the position, who at that time was practicing architecture in New York City, having recently graduated from École des Beaux-Arts, Paris. Parsons arrived at Manila in November 1905, tasked to "interpret" the preliminary plans prepared by Burnham and Anderson for Manila and Baguio, and modify these as needed. Parsons also prepared his own preliminary city plans for Cebu City in 1912, in line with the City Beautiful movement. In this plan the Cebu Provincial Capitol was conceptualized to be positioned at the northern end of Jones Avenue (now Osmeña Boulevard). Parsons would also supervise plans for building projects for the Bureau of Public Works. Several public buildings and parks designed by Parsons are a hybrid of colonial architecture and that of the Philippines, which is a tropical country. Such designs also adopted the use of local material, such as hardwoods and capiz shells for window sash in place of glass to reduce sunlight glare (see Capiz-shell window).

Parsons also prepared the standardized plans of the Gabaldon school buildings, which were designed akin to templates with the intent of promoting efficiency in the planning process. These are school buildings constructed in the Philippines between 1907 and 1946 and named after the late assemblyman Isauro Gabaldon of Nueva Ecija, who authored the Gabaldon Act which appropriated P1 million for the construction of modern public schools nationwide.

Parsons resigned in 1914, and he was succeeded by George Corner Fenhagen as the consulting architect of the Philippine government. He died on December 17, 1939, at his home in New Haven, Connecticut, survived by his wife and two children.

== Works ==
- Gabaldon School Buildings
- Customs Office, Cebu City
- Manila Army and Navy Club Building, Manila
- Manila Elks Club, Manila
- Manila Hotel, Manila
- Paco railway station, Manila
- Philippine General Hospital
- (Old) Provincial Jail, Iloilo City
- H.A. Bordner Building, Manila Science High School
- Philippine Normal School
- Provincial Capitol (Old) of Laguna Province in Santa Cruz, Laguna
- Provincial Capitol (Old) of Nueva Ecija in Cabanatuan
- University Hall of the University of the Philippines Manila
- The Mansion House, Baguio
- Provincial Capitol (Old) of Capiz Province in Roxas City, Capiz
- Casa Gobiyerno in Dumaguete (Note: Casa Gobiyerno was built in 1920 and demolished in 1935.)
- Rizal Old Capitol, Pasig

== See also ==
- Architecture of the Philippines
