= National Museum of the Philippines – Cebu =

Regional museum in Cebu City, Philippines

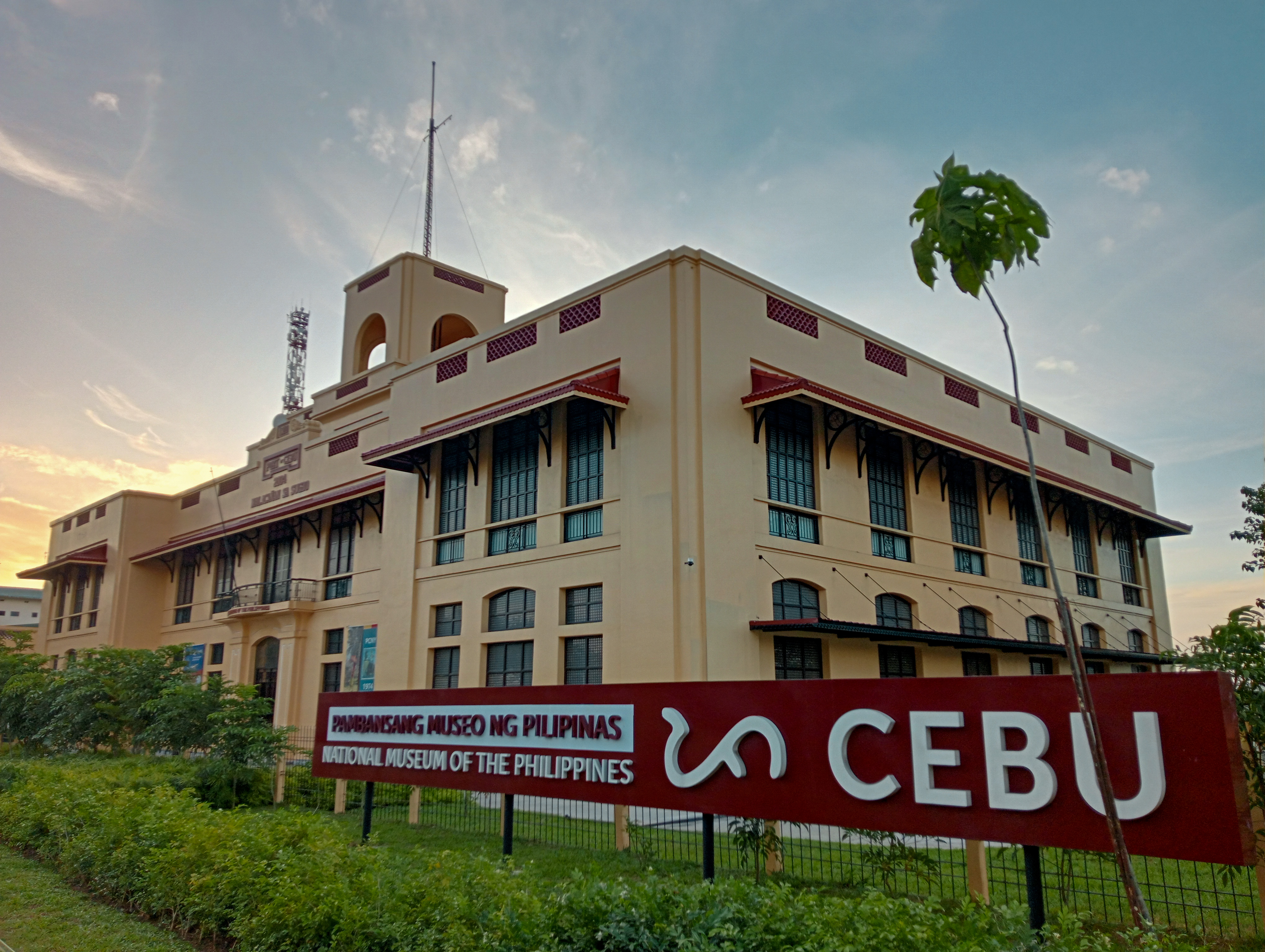
- The Aduana Building as a museum in 2024
- Established: 2023
- Location: Aduana Building, Cebu City, Philippines
- Coordinates: 10°17′30″N 123°54′16″E
- Type: National museum

National Museum of the Philippines – Cebu (Cebuano: Nasudnong Museyo sa Pilipinas – Sugbo; Filipino: Pambansang Museo ng Pilipinas – Cebu) is a museum in Cebu City, Philippines under the National Museum of the Philippines system. It is hosted at the Aduana (Customs) building.

== History ==
Aduana Building
- Former names: Malakanyang sa Sugbo (2004–2022)

General information
- Current tenants: National Museum Central Visayas
- Inaugurated: 1910
- Renovated: 2004
- Owner: National Museum of the Philippines

Technical details
- Structural system: Reinforced concrete

Design and construction
- Architect: William E. Parsons

=== Construction ===
Previously known as the Aduana (Customs) building, it was originally constructed in 1910 to house the Bureau of Customs (BOC) office at the Port of Cebu City. It was designed by William E. Parsons, who served as the architect of the Philippine government from 1905 to 1914. Parsons had been selected by Daniel H. Burnham to execute the plans for the cities of Manila and Baguio. He also developed his own plan for the city of Cebu, with the Customs Office being the first building constructed under that plan. The building served as the Customs office until 2004, where it was renamed into Malakanyang sa Sugbo. It never really functioned as secondary presidential palace or office.

The Bureau of Customs was forced to vacate the building and relocated to a rented facility owned by the Cebu Ports Authority (CPA). In July 2012, the Bureau of Customs attempted to repossess and return to the Aduana after the building they had been occupying sustained damage from the February 6, 2012 earthquake. Large cracks appeared in the ceiling, floor, and interior walls following the temblor. Although the Aduana remained under the ownership of the BOC, it was unused and described by the Customs office as a "white elephant."

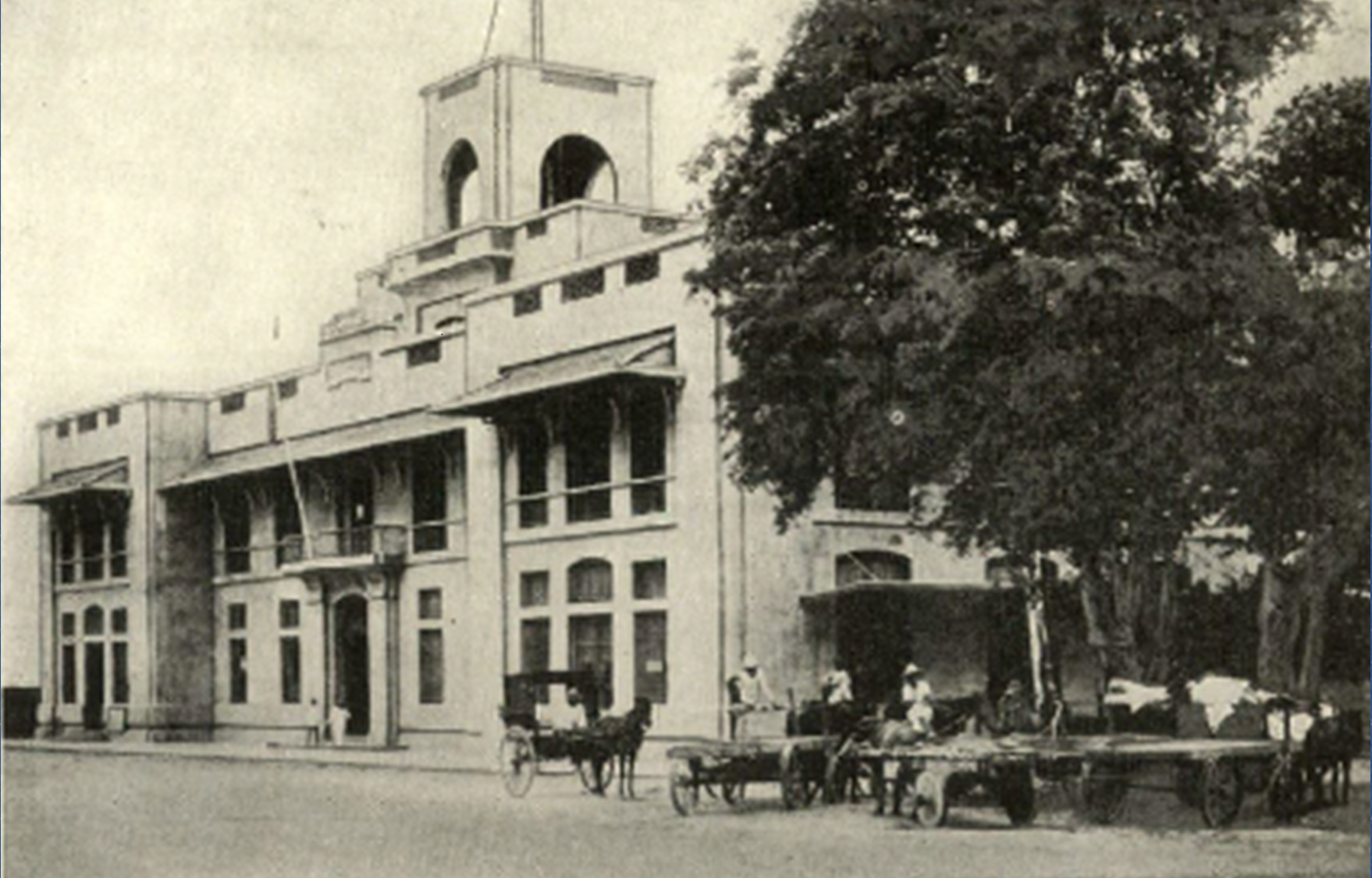
Customs House, 1910.

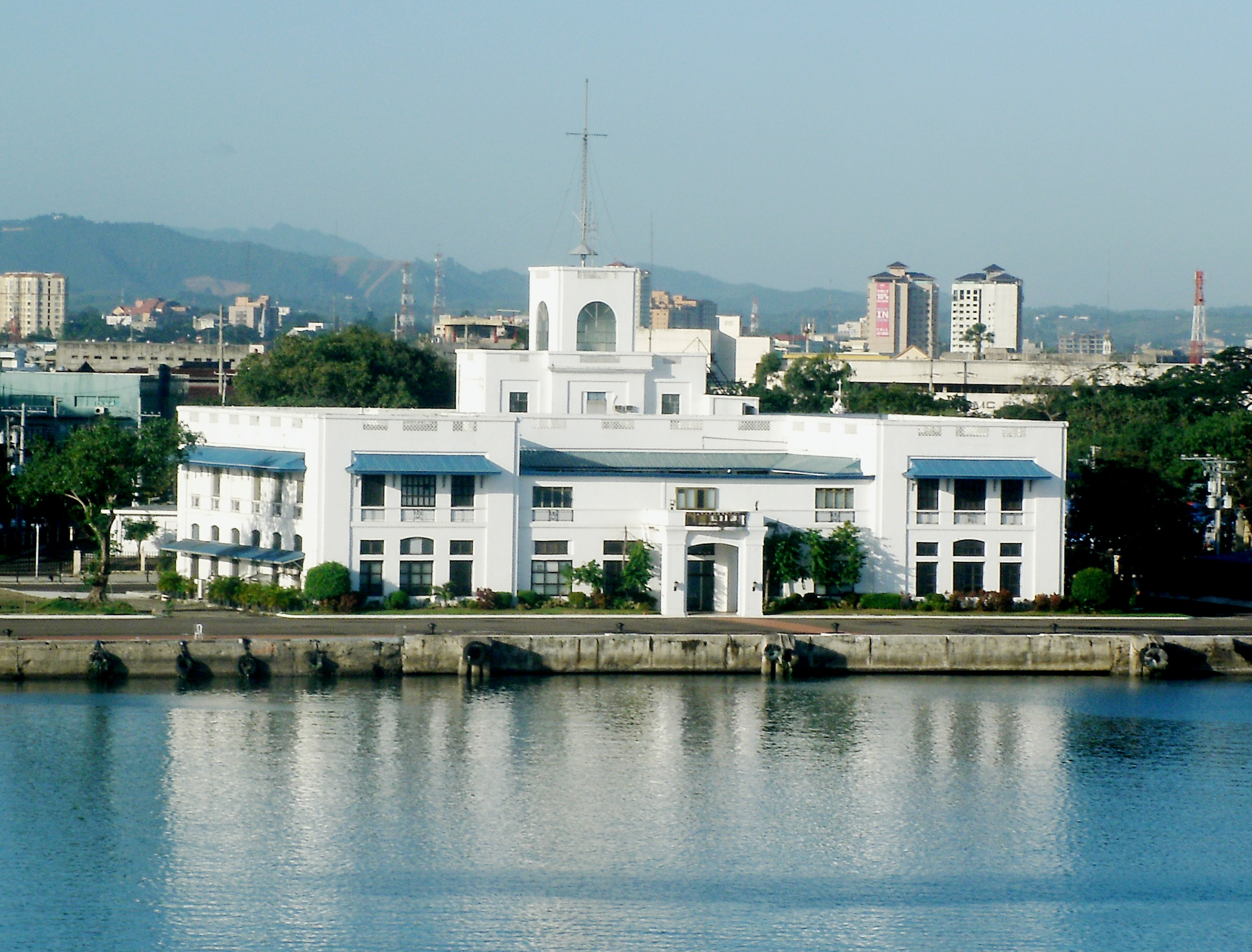
The facade of the building from the coast.

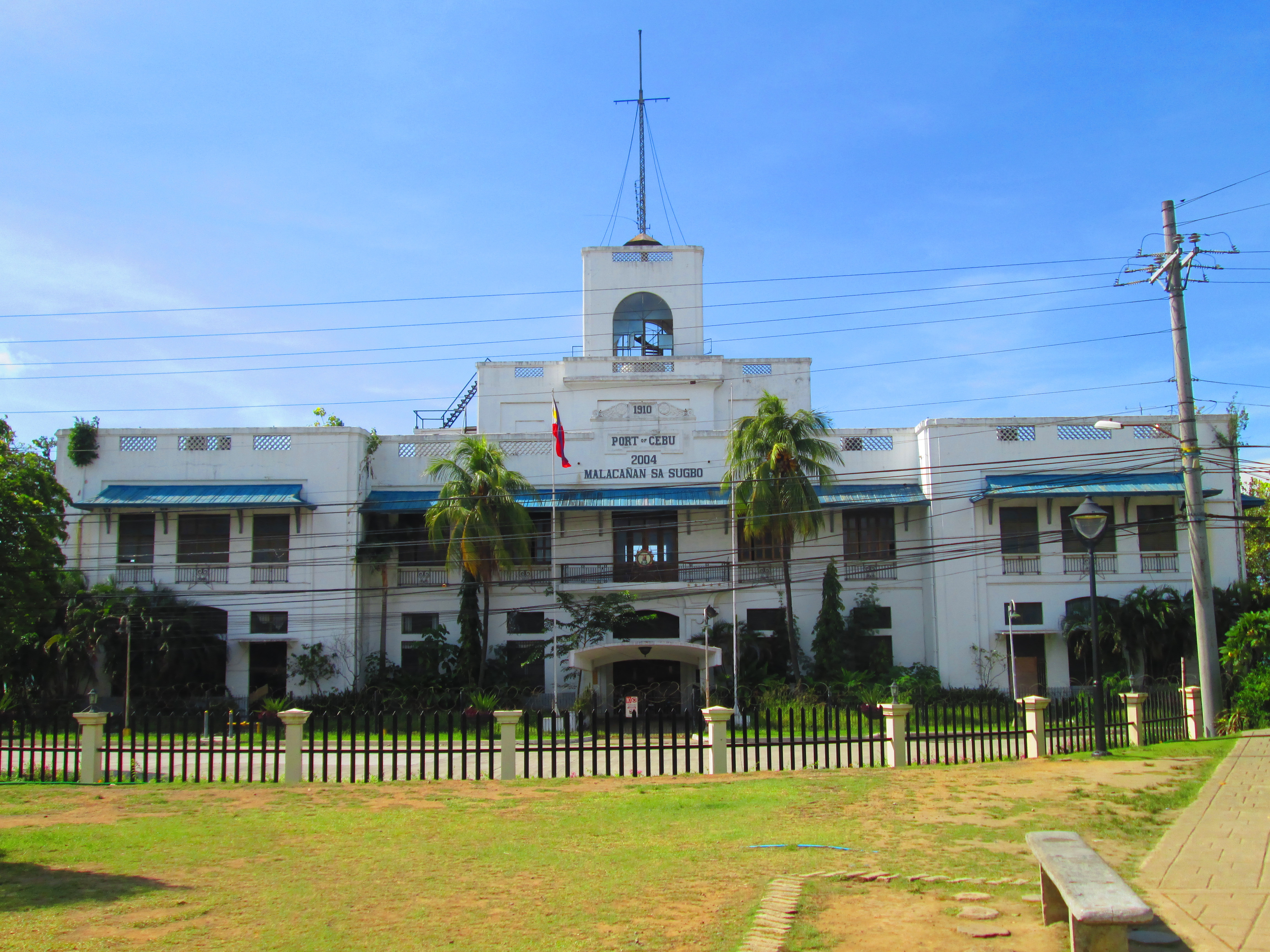
Malakanyang sa Sugbo in 2018.

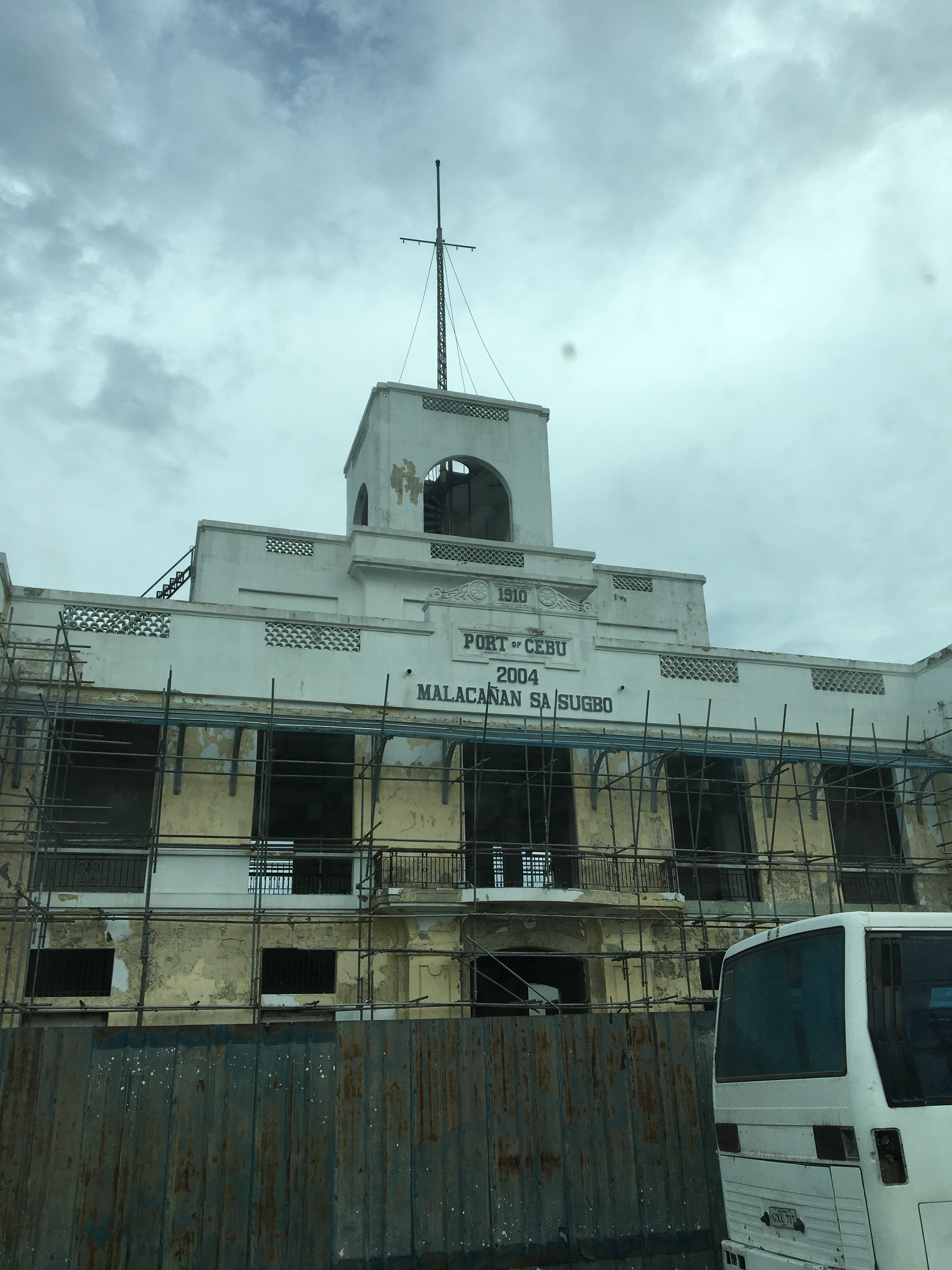
Malakanyang sa Sugbo under renovation in 2022

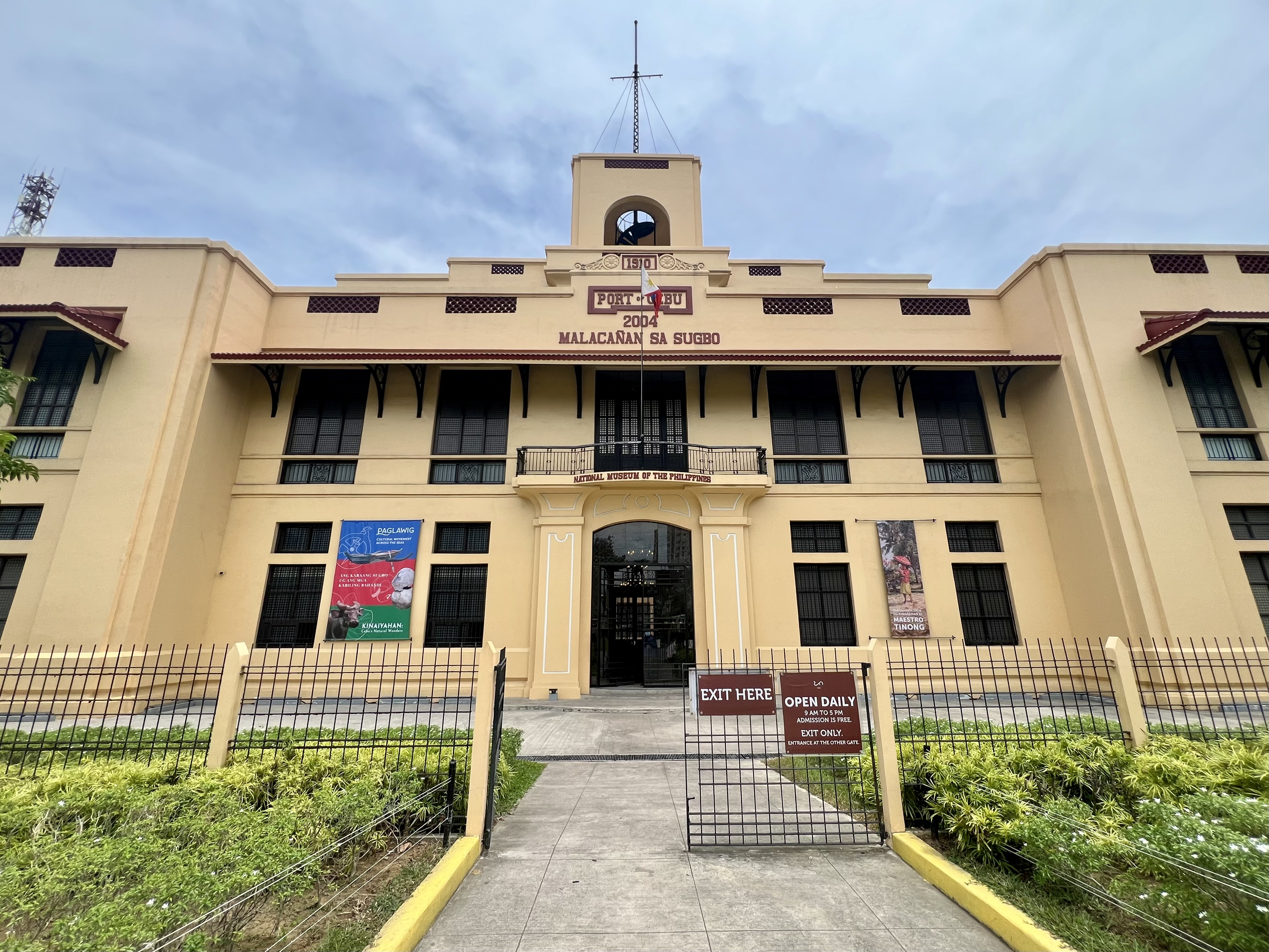
Malacañan sa Sugbo façade in 2026

=== Ownership issues ===
Inauguration as a museum on 28 July 2023

In 2013, the Malakanyang sa Sugbo building was cordoned off and declared off-limits after structural engineers from Cebu City's Department of Engineering and Public Works determined it had been rendered unsafe by the October 15 earthquake. The building was reopened on July 19, 2016, for inspection and ongoing assessment to identify the necessary repairs and estimate the associated costs. Presidential Assistant for the Visayas (PAV), Michael Dino, occupied a room in the building’s left wing as the PAV office.

=== Heritage recognition and conversion to a museum ===
In 2019, the building was declared a National Cultural Treasure. It was later converted into the National Museum Central Visayas. The museum was inaugurated on July 28, 2023, and opened to the public on August 1, 2023.

== Gallery ==
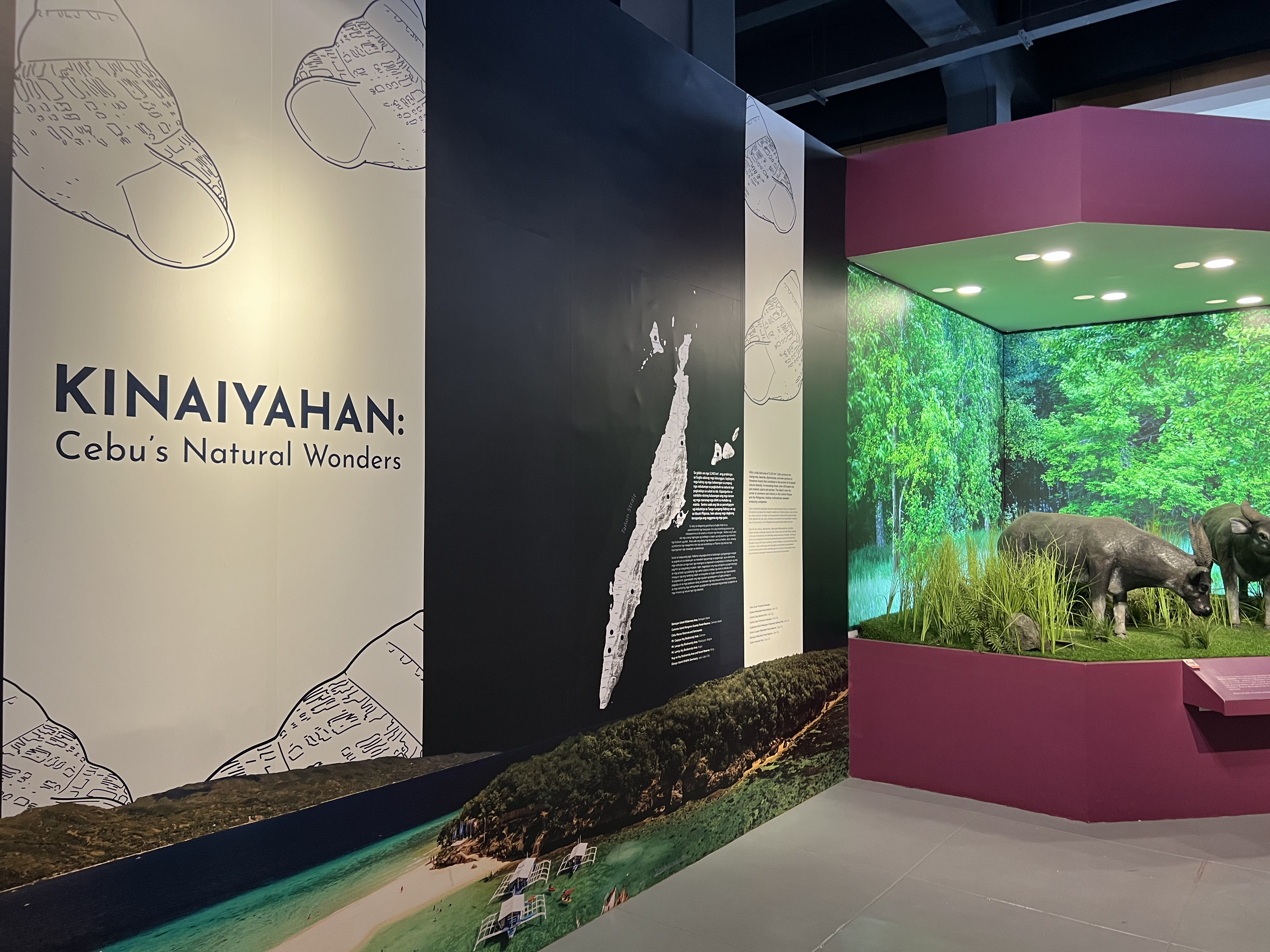
Kinaiyahan: Cebu's Natural Wonders

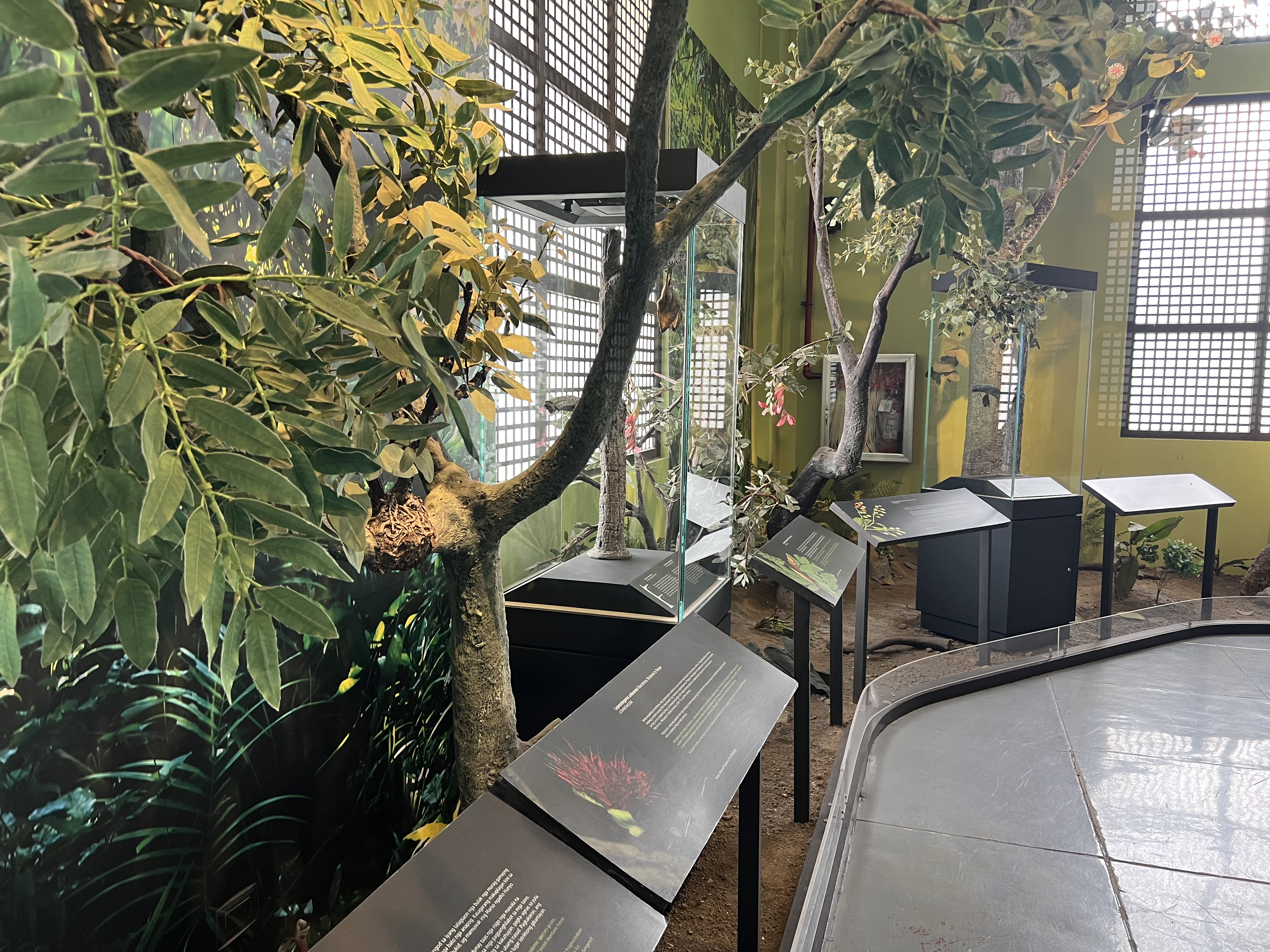
Diorama of Cebu native forest flora

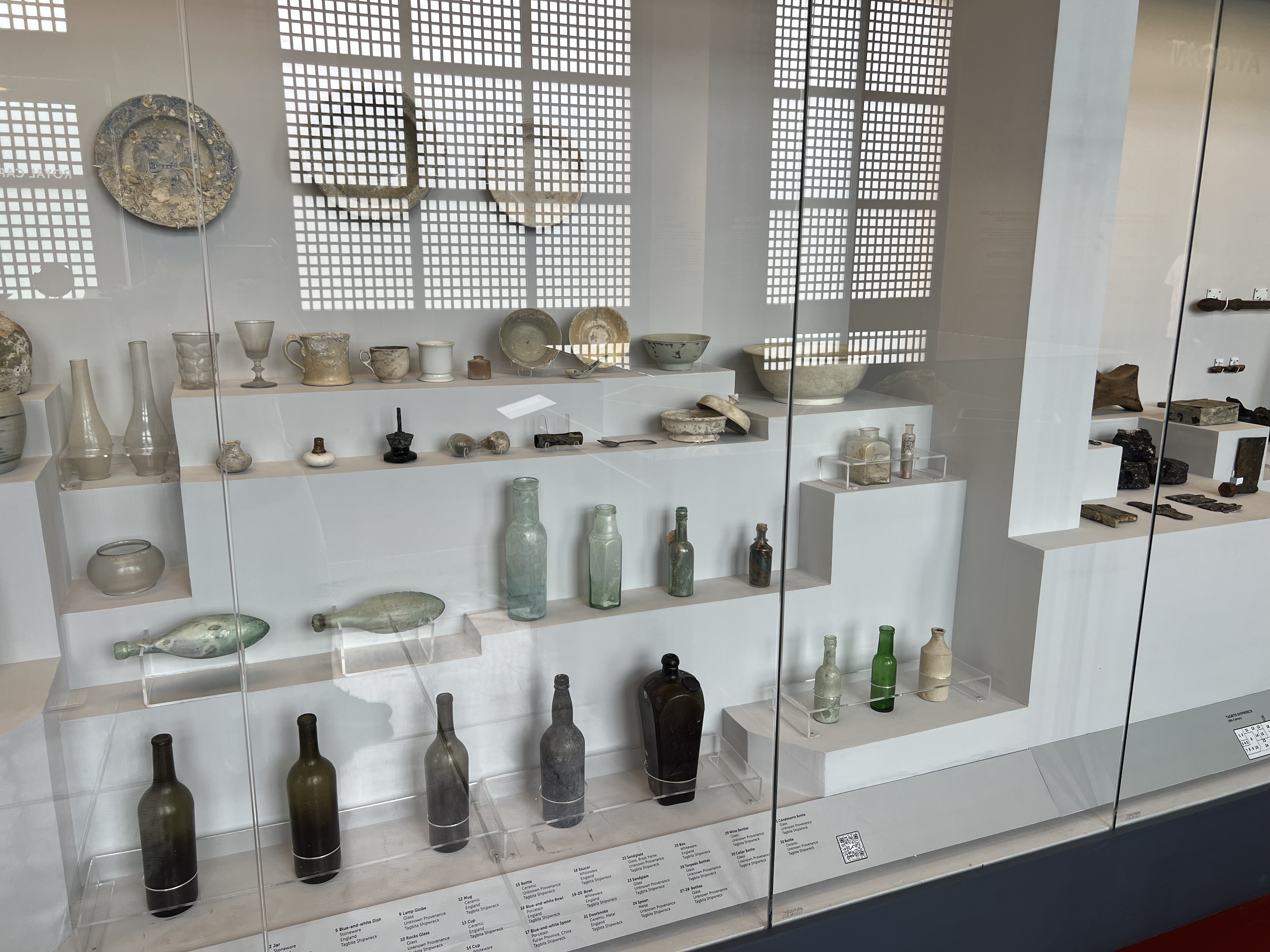
Various implements from historical shipwrecks at the Paglawig: Cultural Movement Across Seas gallery

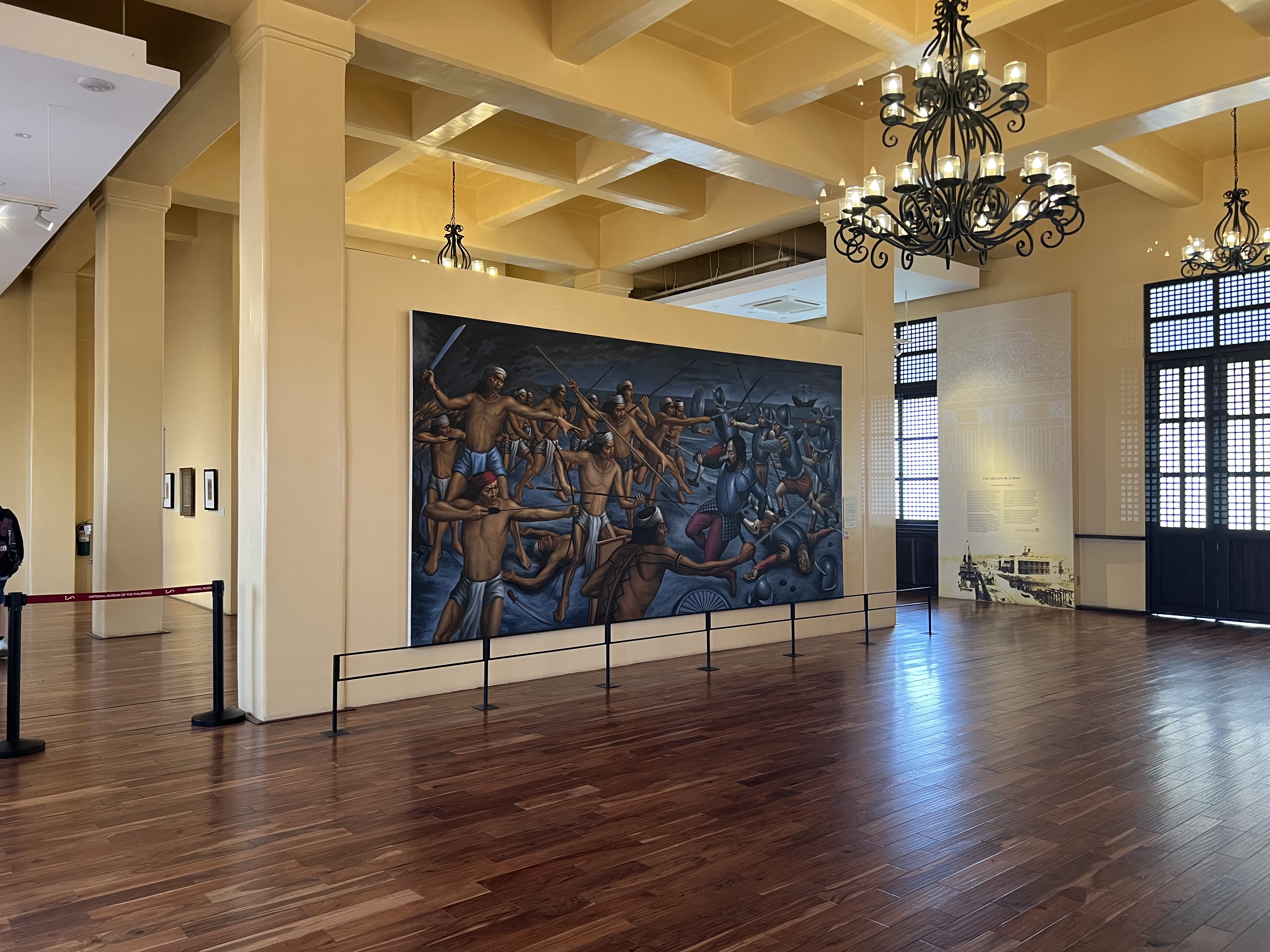
Second floor gallery

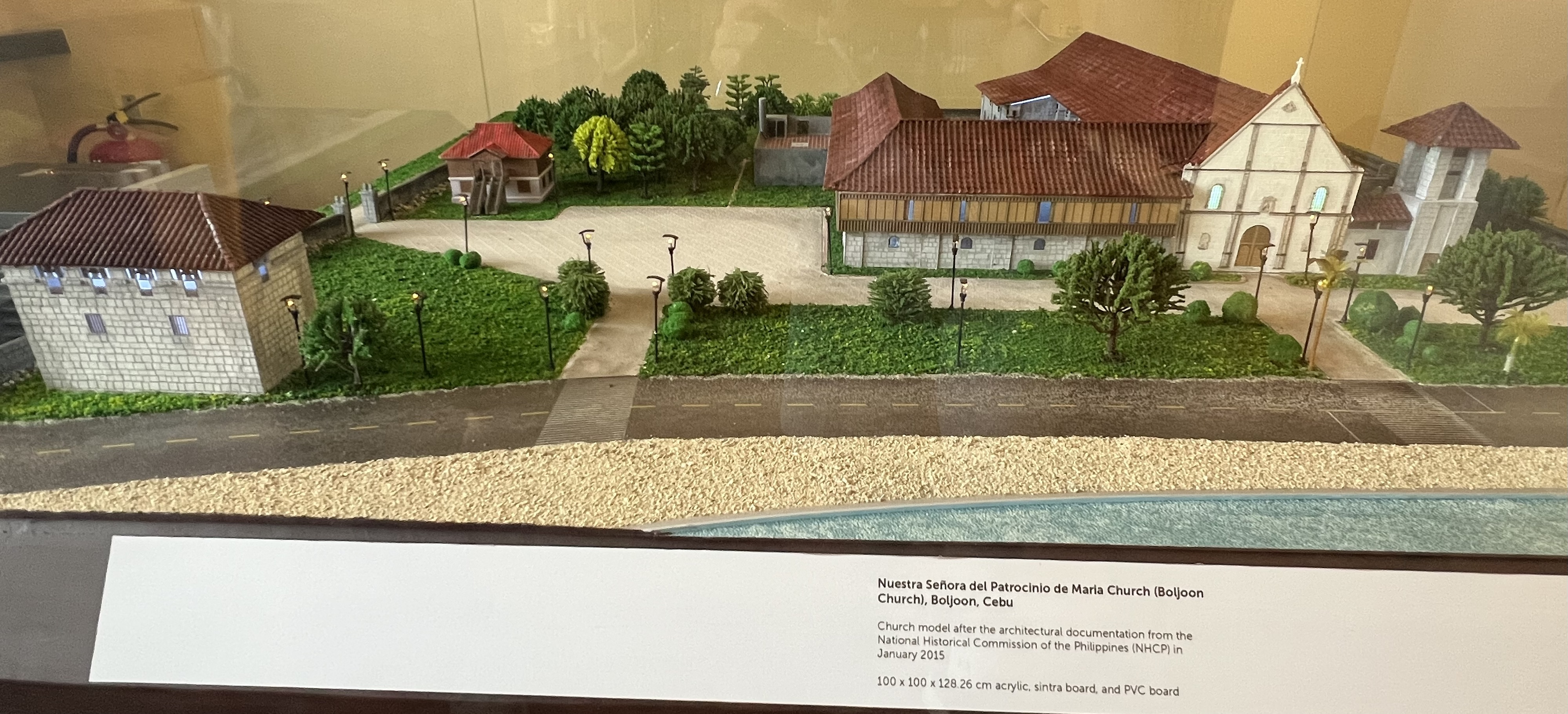
Diorama of the Boljoon Church complex at the Ang Tinukod nga Kabilin gallery

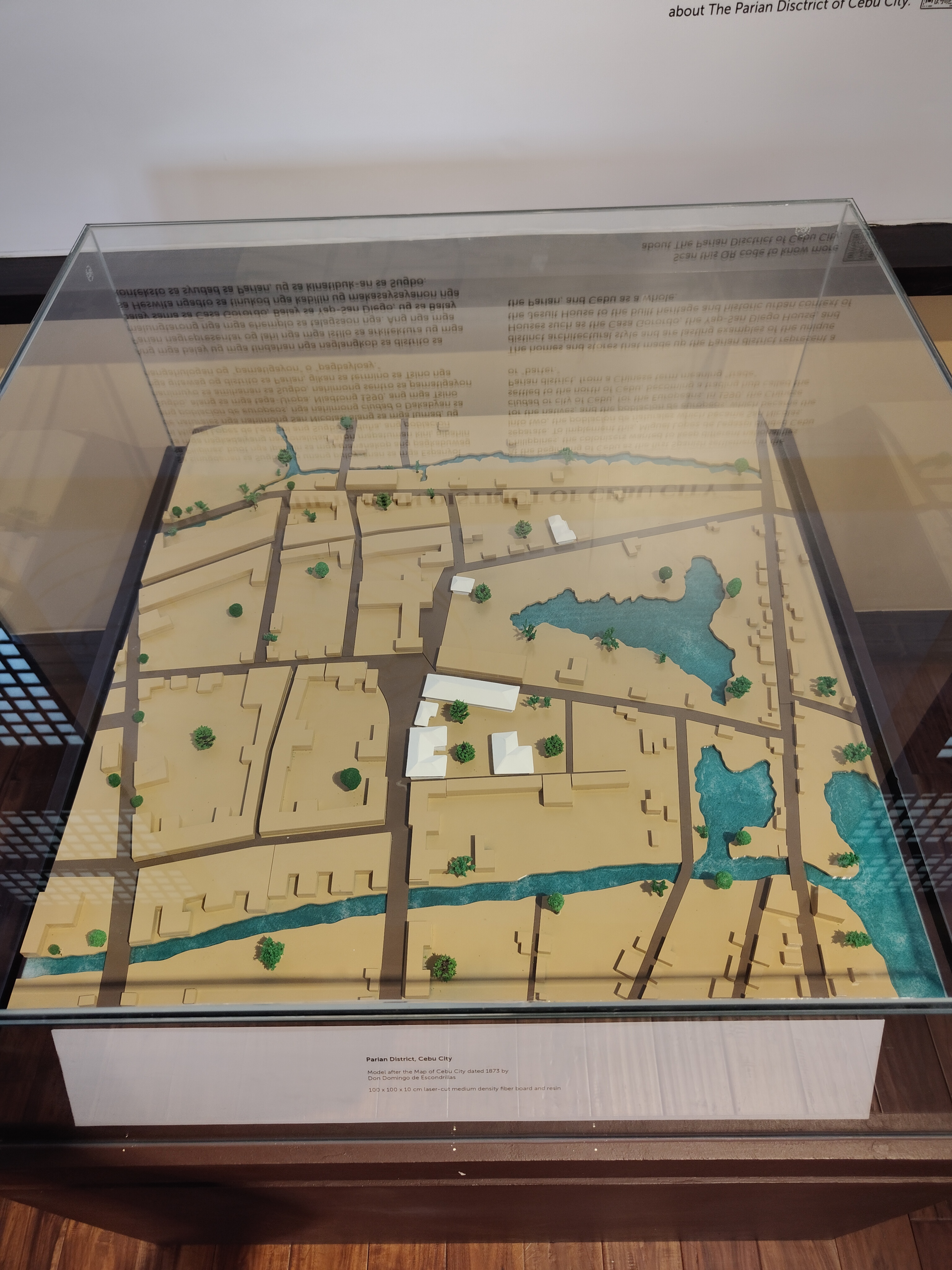
Diorama of the Cebu City Parian district

== See also ==
- Malacañang of the South, the official residence of the president of the Philippines in Mindanao
- The Mansion, Baguio, the official summer residence of the president of the Philippines
