= Camarines Sur National High School =

Public high school in Naga City, Camarines Sur, Philippines

- Pambansang Mataas na Paaralan ng Camarines Sur (Filipino)
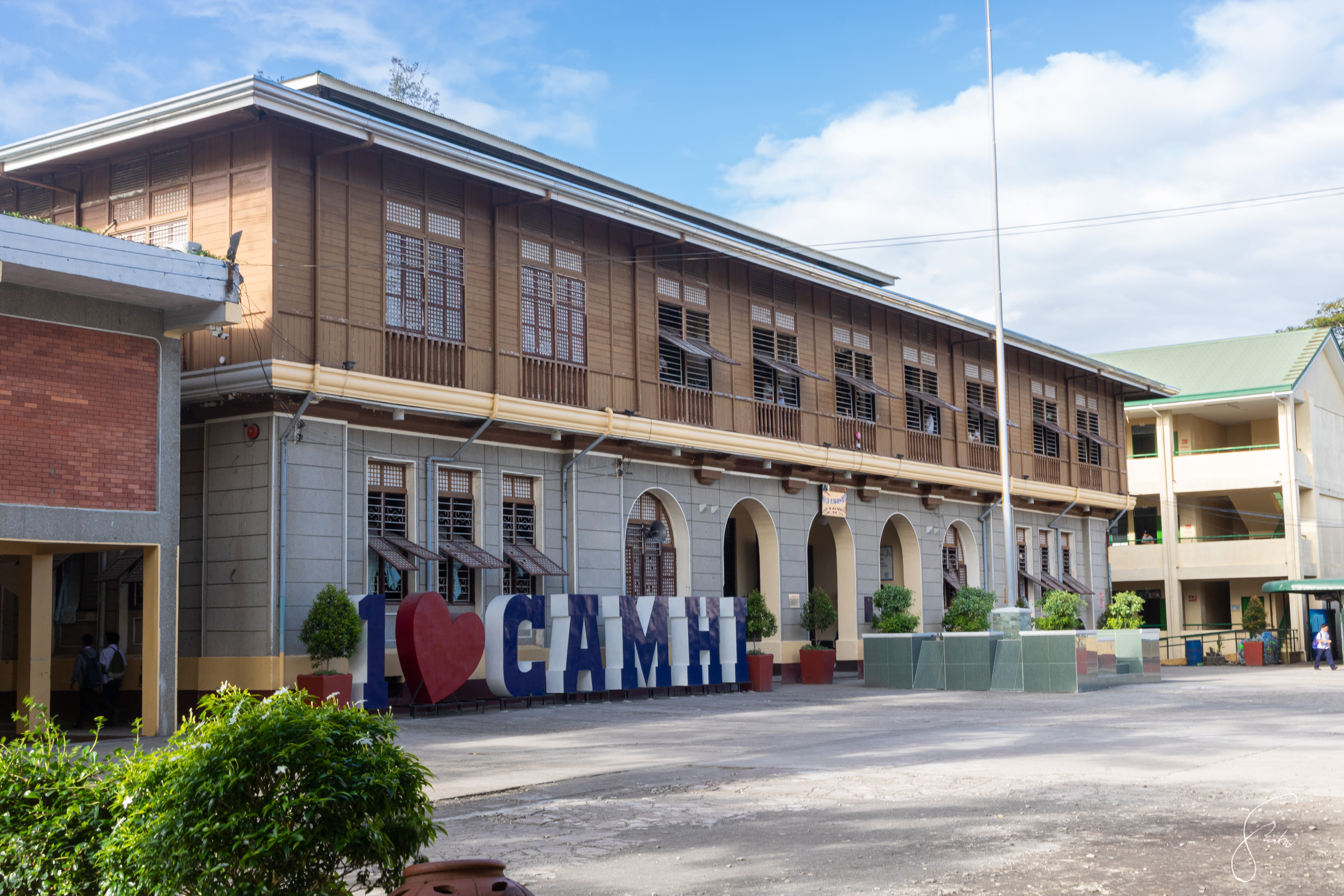

Location
- Naga City, Camarines Sur; Philippines
- Coordinates: 13°37′49″N 123°11′26″E

Information
- Type: Public School
- Motto: Education for the Total Man
- Established: 1902
- Principal: Sulpicio C. Alferez III, Ph.D.
- Grades: 7 to 12
- Enrollment: approx. 12,000
- Campuses: 2
- Colours: Blue and White
- Website: www.facebook.com/csnhs1902official

The Camarines Sur National High School, also called CamHi, is the oldest national high school in Camarines Sur and one of the biggest public secondary schools in the Bicol Region, Philippines, having a student population of 11,899 in the school year 2021–2022. It was established in 1902.

== History ==
=== 1900s ===
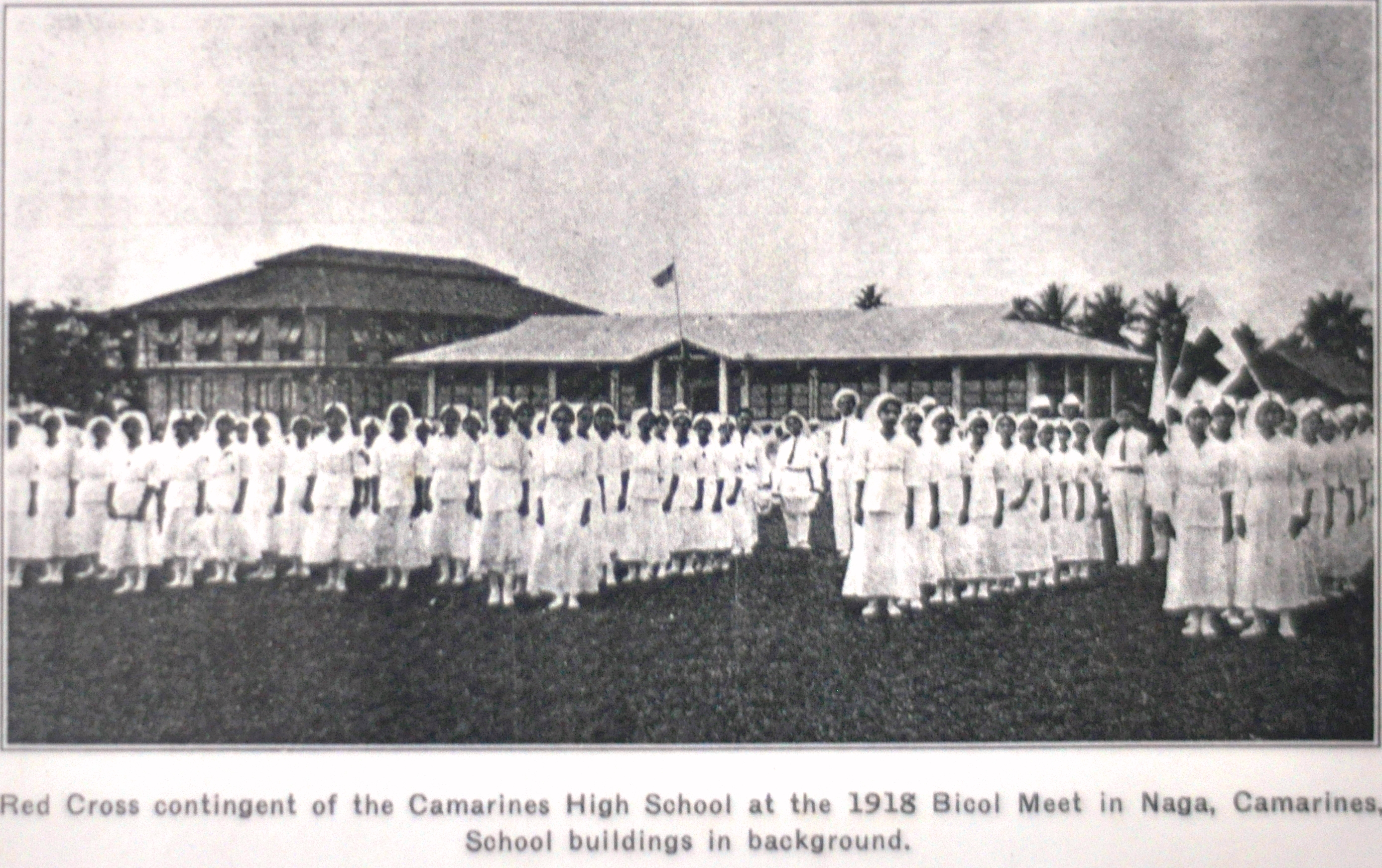
The Old Science Building and the main Building taken during the 1918 Bicol Meet

The Philippine Commission enacted Act No. 74 creating the Department of Public Instruction on January 21, 1901, and later that year, American educators known as Thomasites arrived in Ambos Camarines (the province's name before it was split into two, Camarines Sur and Camarines Norte) to teach the Bicolanos. On July 15, 1902, the school was launched as the Provincial High School of Nueva Caceres (former name of Naga City when it was still a town). Headed by its first principal Mr. Frank Crone and assisted by Ms. Minerva Udell, the institution started with 70 students and 4 American mentors. The attendance increased steadily and by the end of the first term there were 200 students. Then it was transferred somewhere on Mabini Street (now San Francisco) until it was transferred in 1915 to Via Gainza (now Peñafrancia Avenue), its present location. It was by then known as Camarines High School.

=== American liberation ===
The school was re-opened during the American liberation in 1945 until it became dilapidated and was declared unsafe for occupancy in 1949.

=== The 1950s ===
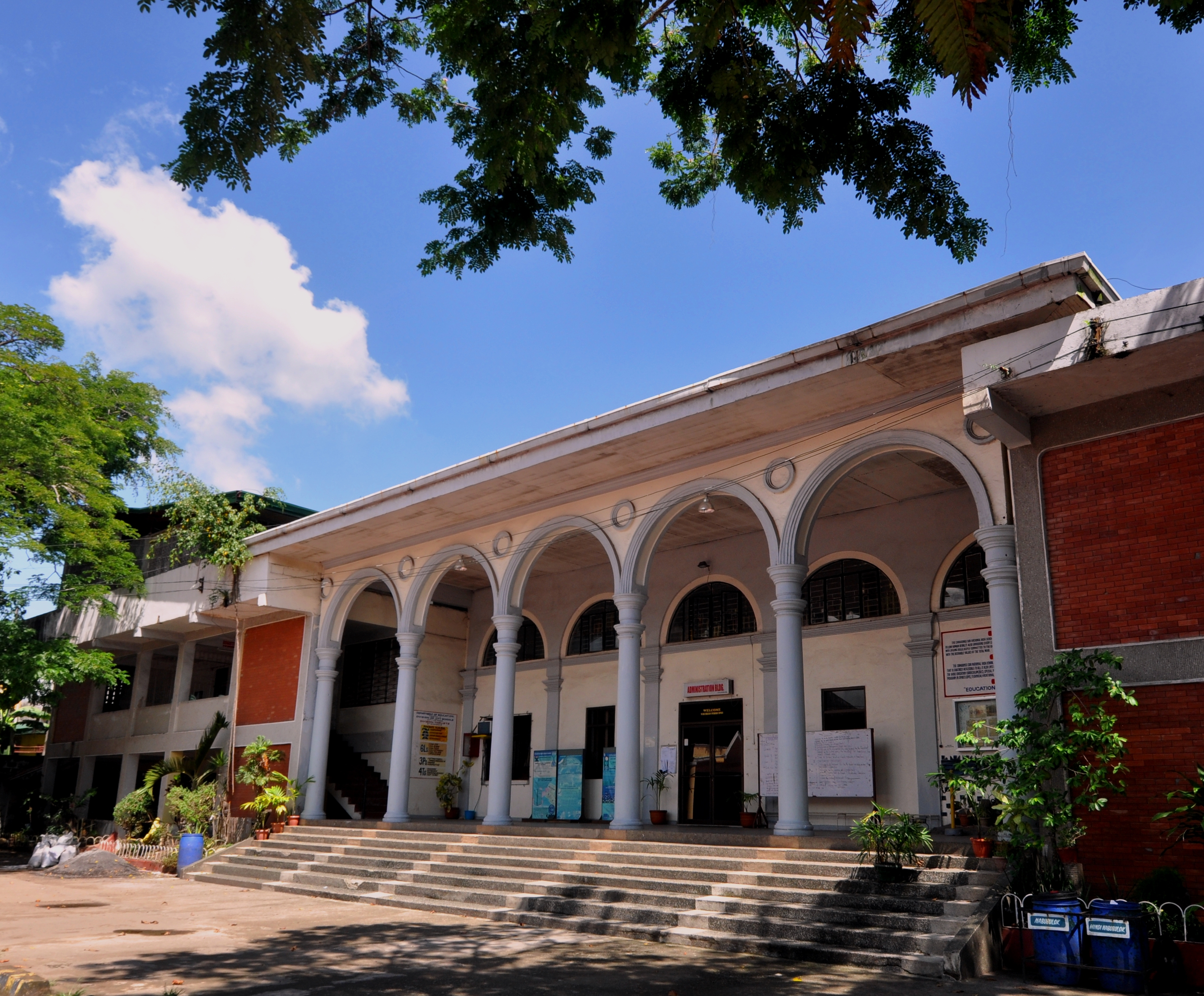
The Gabaldon Building-Italianate Style

In 1950, former city mayor Leon SA. Aureus initiated the organization of Camarines Sur High School Alumni Association. Additional school buildings were constructed in 1951 with the initiative of Provincial Governor Juan F. Trivino and batch 1933. Night classes were opened in 1968 until 1983 to address the needs of working students.

=== The 1960s to 1990s ===
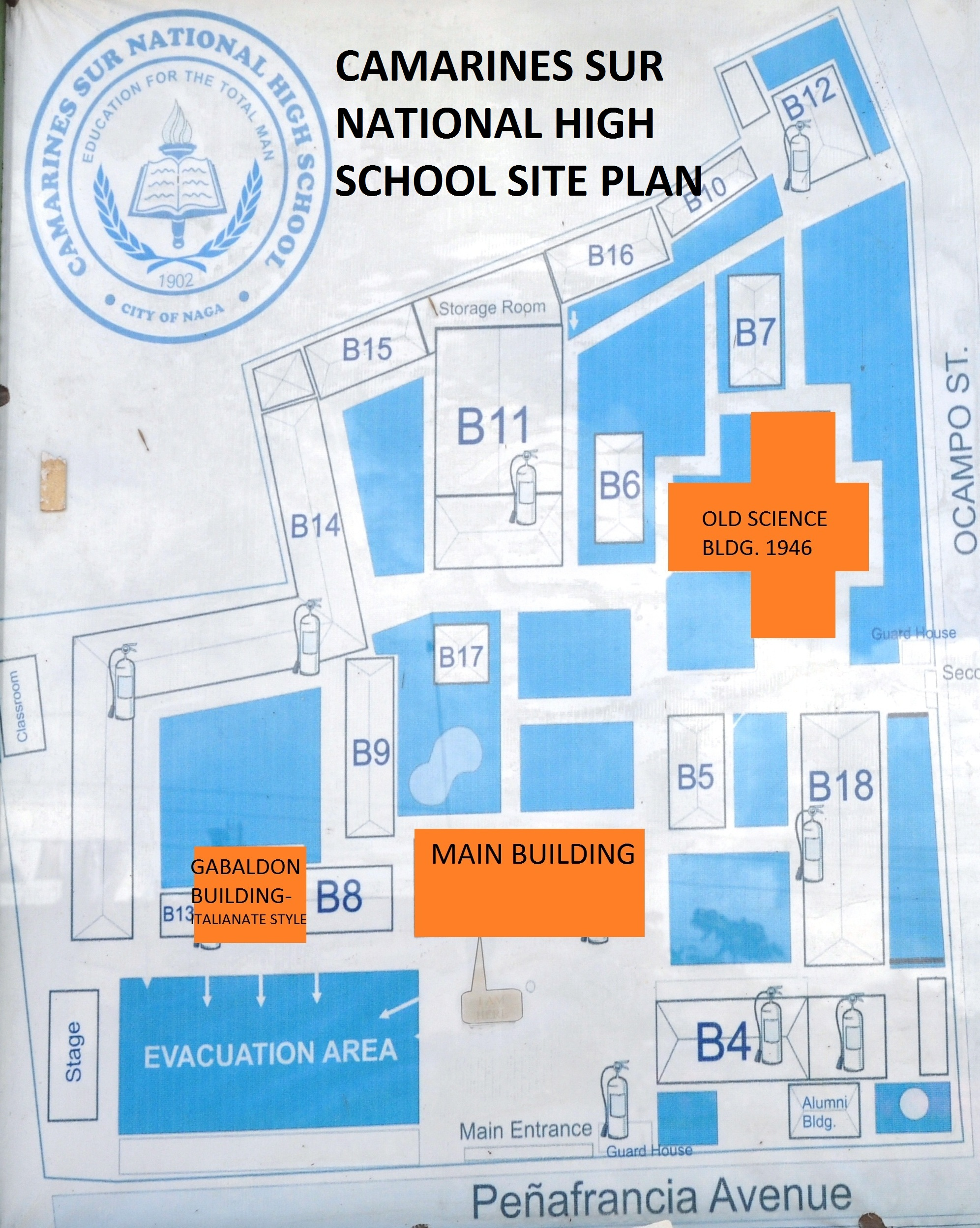
the school site plan

On June 29, 1969, President Ferdinand Marcos approved Republic Act 5529, converting the institution into Camarines Sur National High School. In 1971, Camarines Sur Community College was established offering two-year post-secondary education. In 1977 to 1992 with Ms. Pura Luisa Magtoto as principal, more buildings and facilities were constructed including the Student Pavilion. A Balik Adal Project, a special community outreach program was launched in 1985 with the help of the Naga City local government. In 1991, the Engineering and Science Education Program was launched under the enriched curriculum in English, Science and Technology and Mathematics. In 1992 Mrs. Rosa Perez succeeded as principal for a short term.

=== The 1990s-2000s ===
In 1994 to 2002, under the leadership of Mrs. Elizabeth Palo, additional buildings were built including the Andaya and Roco Buildings. A Special Education Program and Special Program in the Arts were opened in 1999 and 2000 respectively. In 2001, the school represented Luzon to the Project Sterling Program, a peer accreditation to public secondary school sponsored by the Department of Education, Philippine Association of Secondary Schools Administrators and the University of Asia and the Pacific. The school was accredited in 2003.

=== Centennial Celebration ===
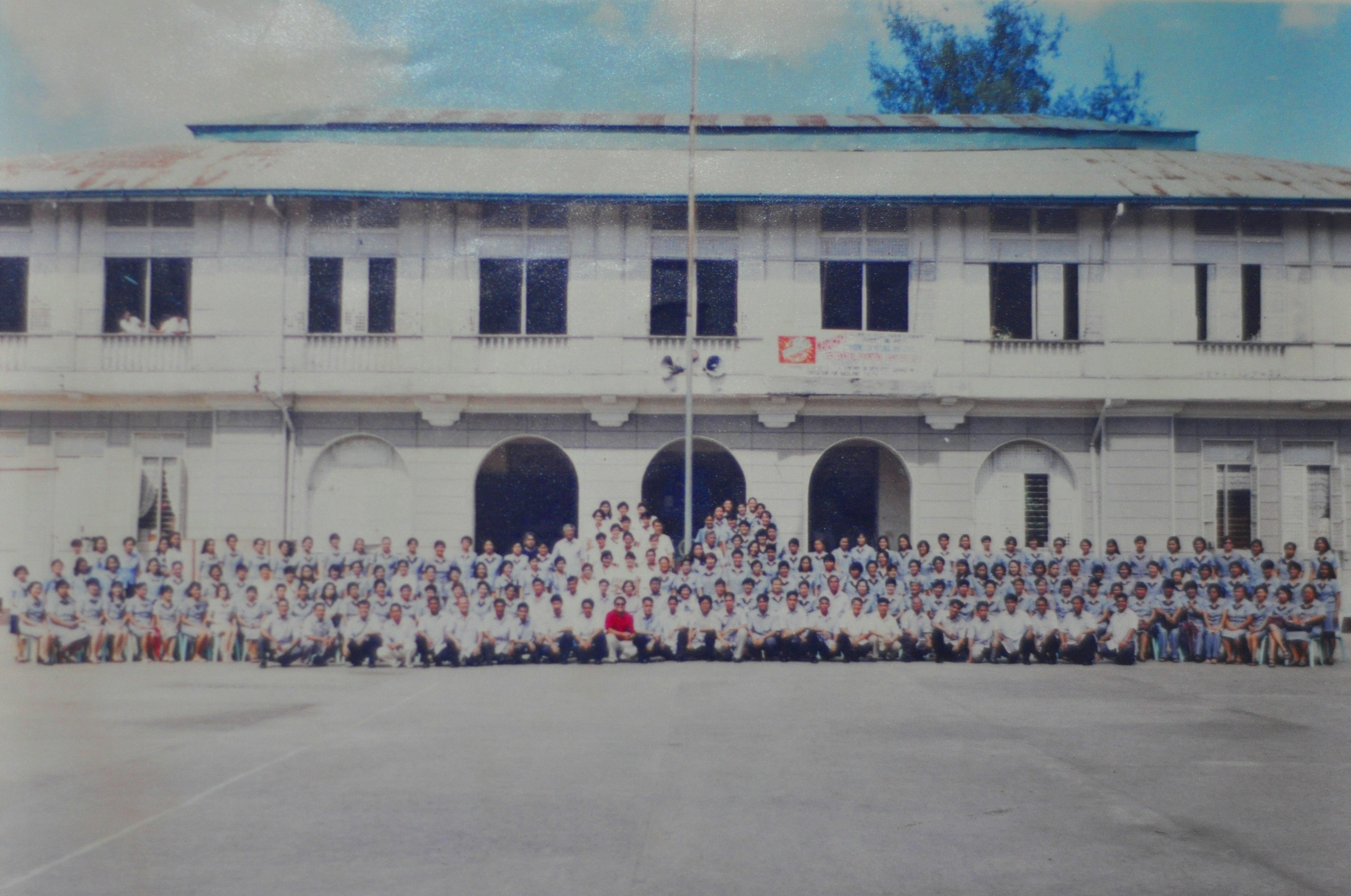
The 224 faculty and 50 employees of the school during the Centennial Founding Anniversary celebration in 2002

The school successfully celebrated its Centennial Foundation Anniversary on December 15, 2002, after a historical record was rectified that the actual date of its creation is June 15, 1902, and not in 1904. It was based on the researched made by Prof. Danilo Gerona a foremost Bikolano historian with the help of school's Centennial Research team composed of Mrs. Salve Lapuz, Mr. Jarme Taumatorgo and Ms. Yolanda Castor. In November 2002, Mrs. Nelly Abad became principal. Under her watch, Late Afternoon Class for working students reopened. New DepEd programs were offered, namely: Special Program in Sports, Family Farm Curriculum, Strengthened Technical-Vocational Education Program, Career Pathway-Technology and Livelihood Education and Foreign Language (Spanish). Enrichment subjects for fast learners and remedial classes for specially challenged students were introduced. The school was a hall of fame awardee for the best Brigada Eskwela implementer nationwide for big school category- secondary level.

== Gallery ==
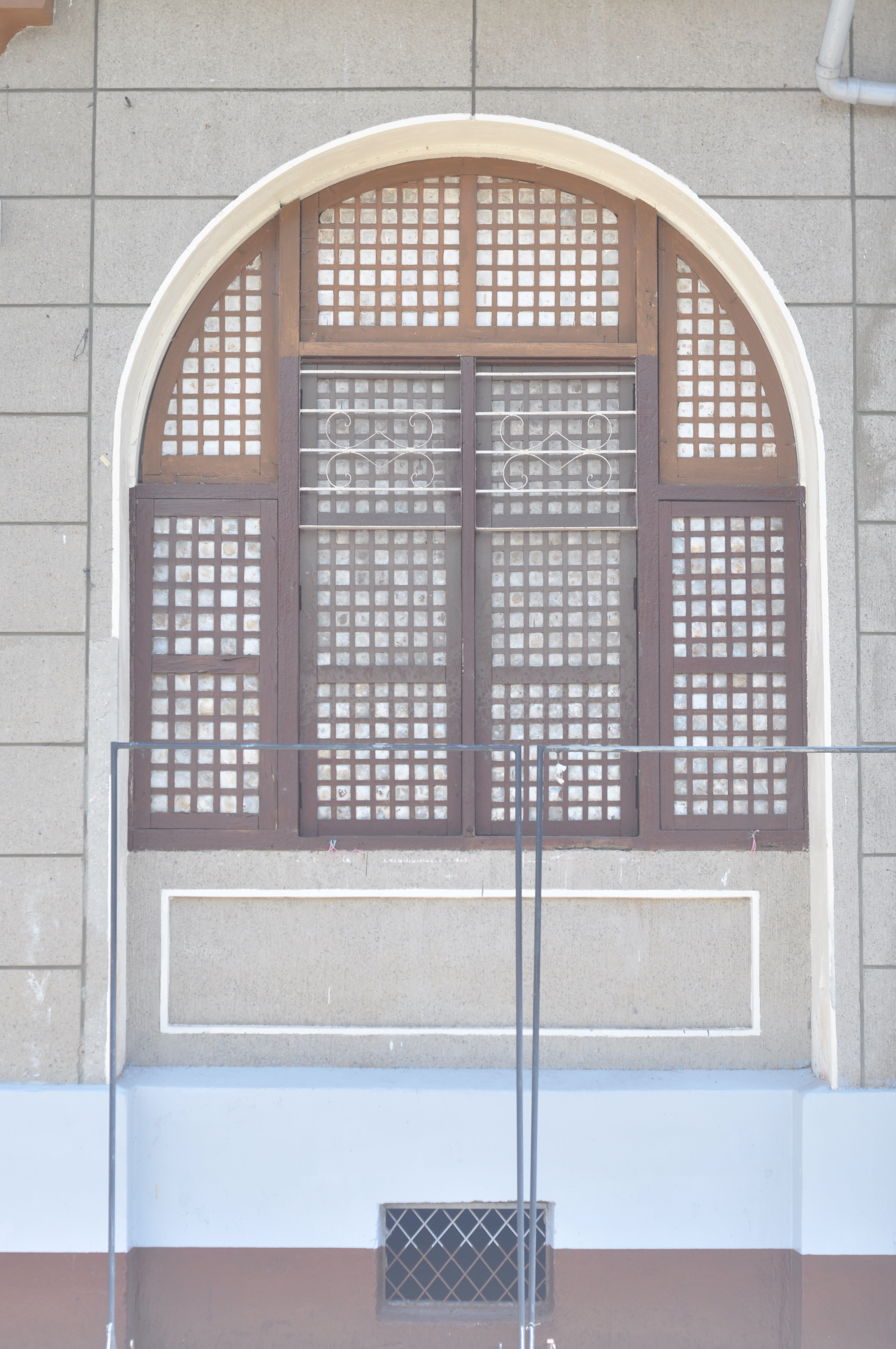
Main building's Capiz windows

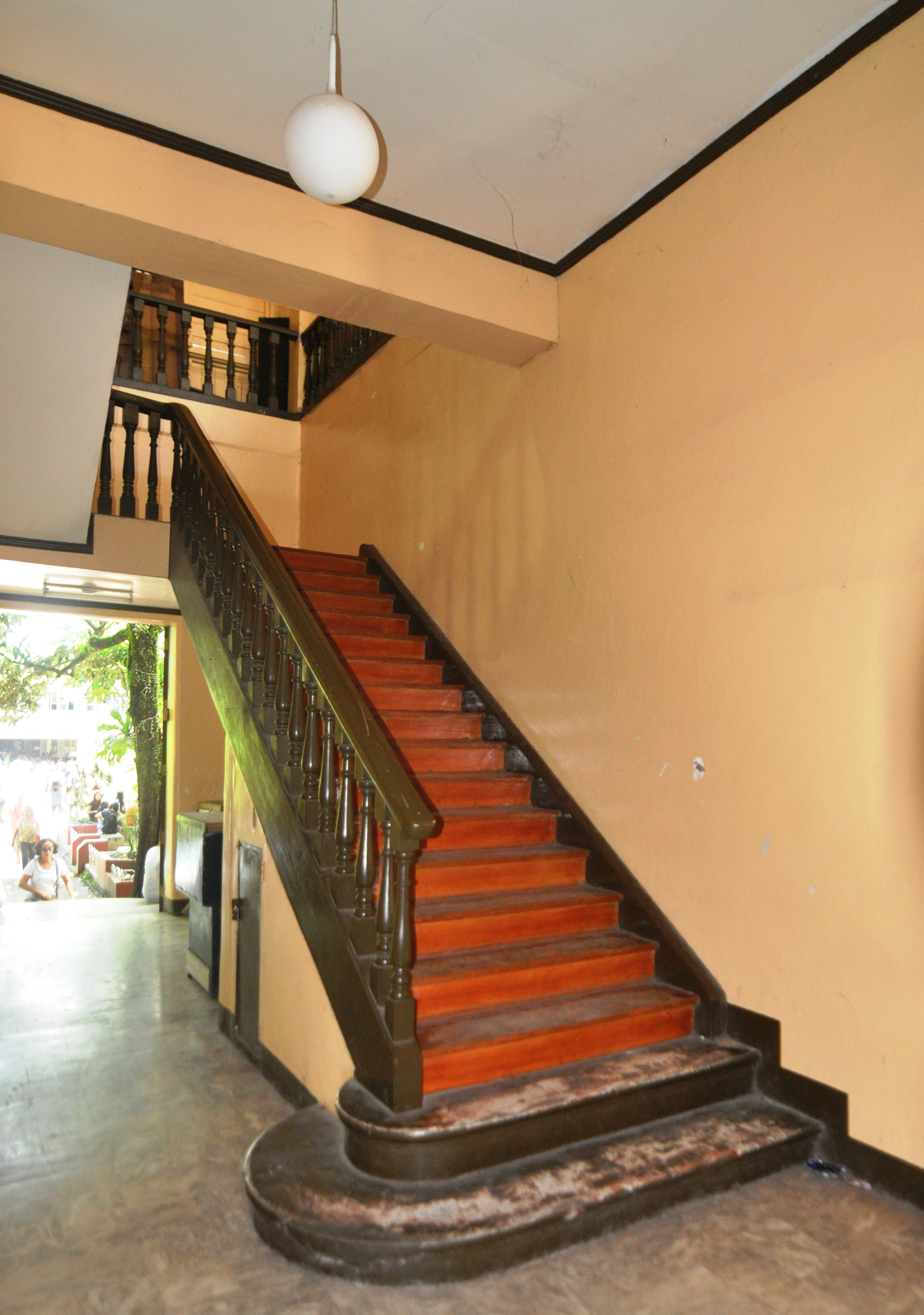
One of the two stairs located at the side of the main building

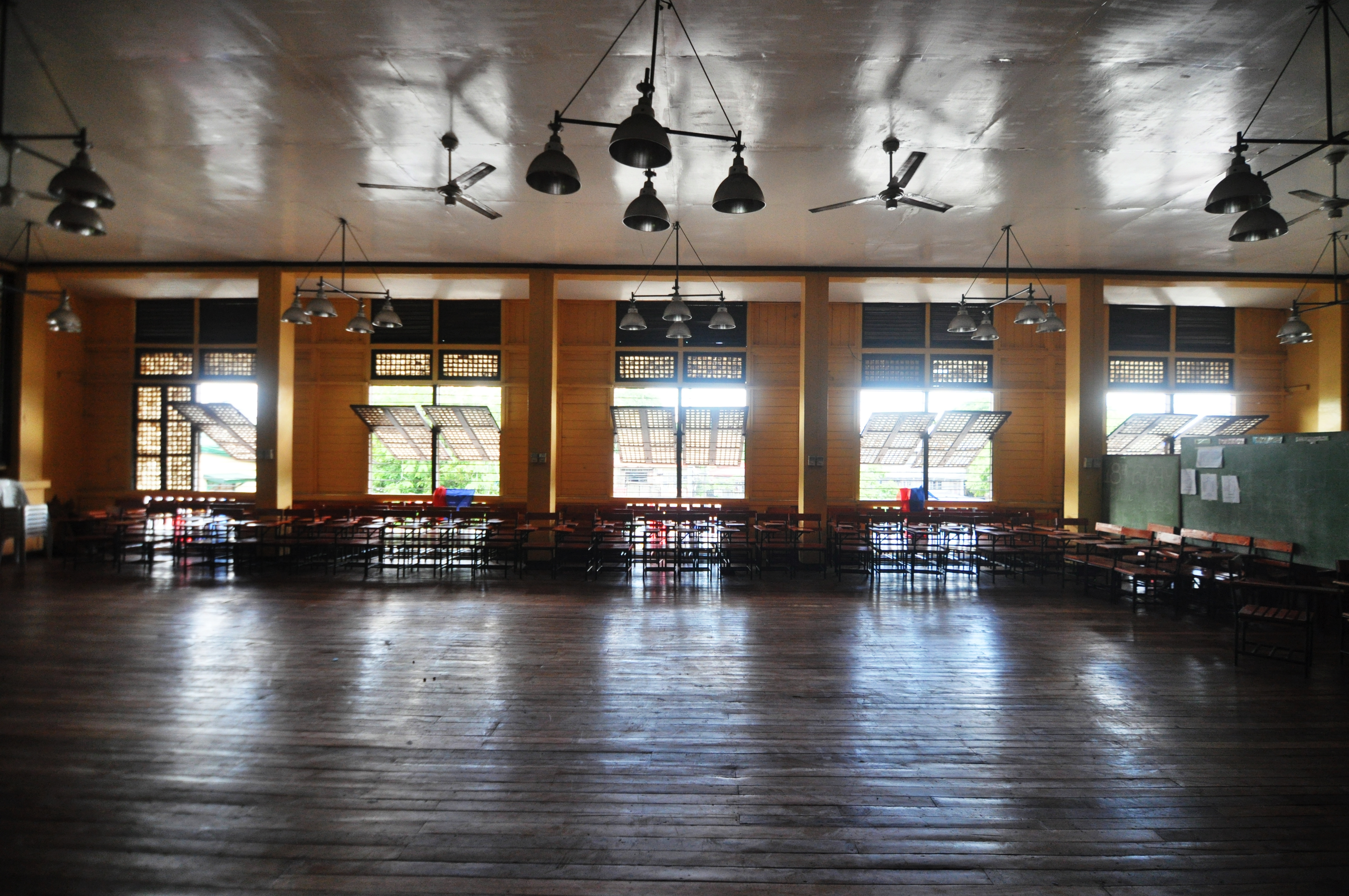
The Meeting Hall at the second floor

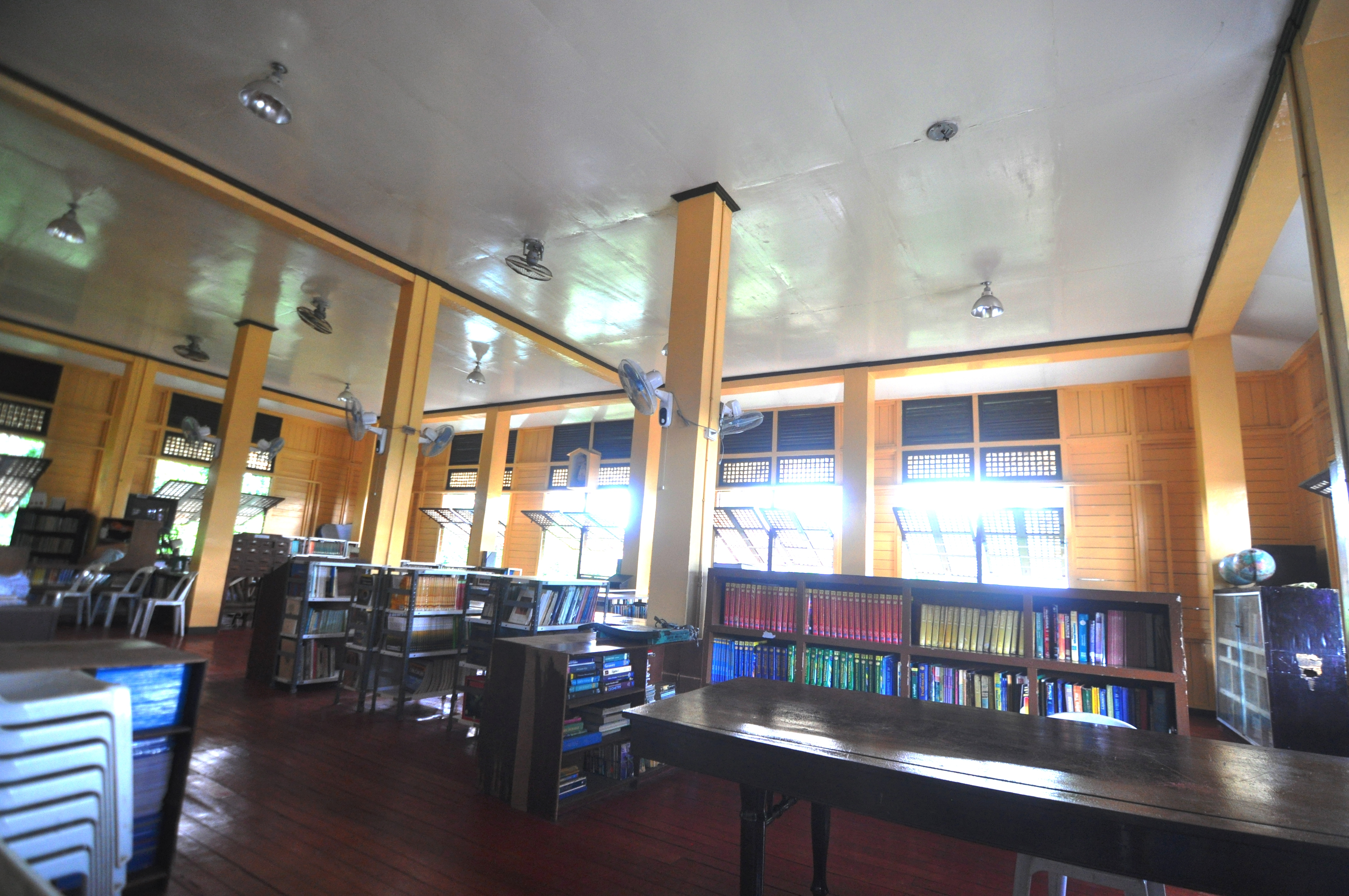
The school's library on the second floor of the main building

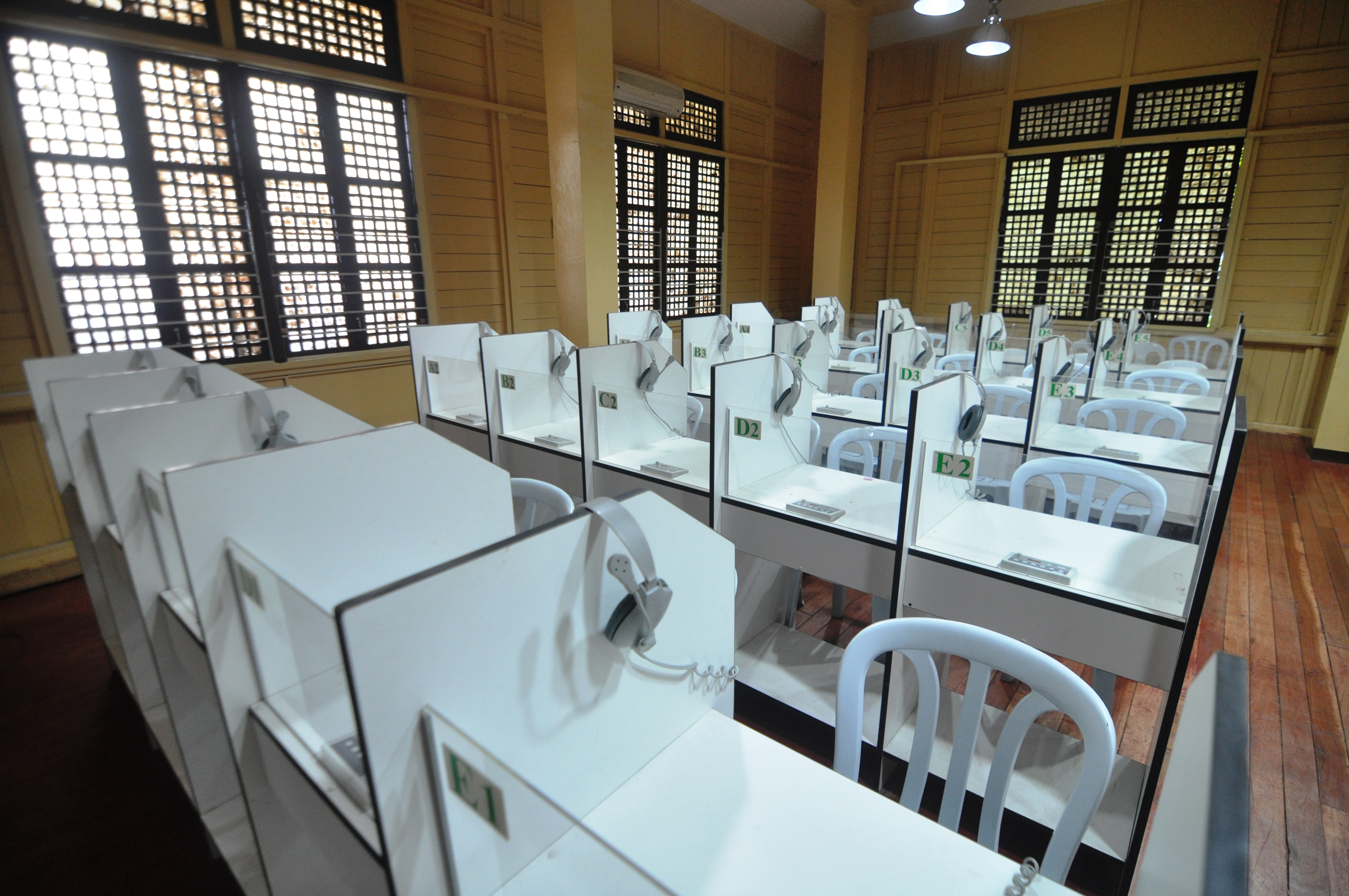
The speech laboratory at the main building's second floor

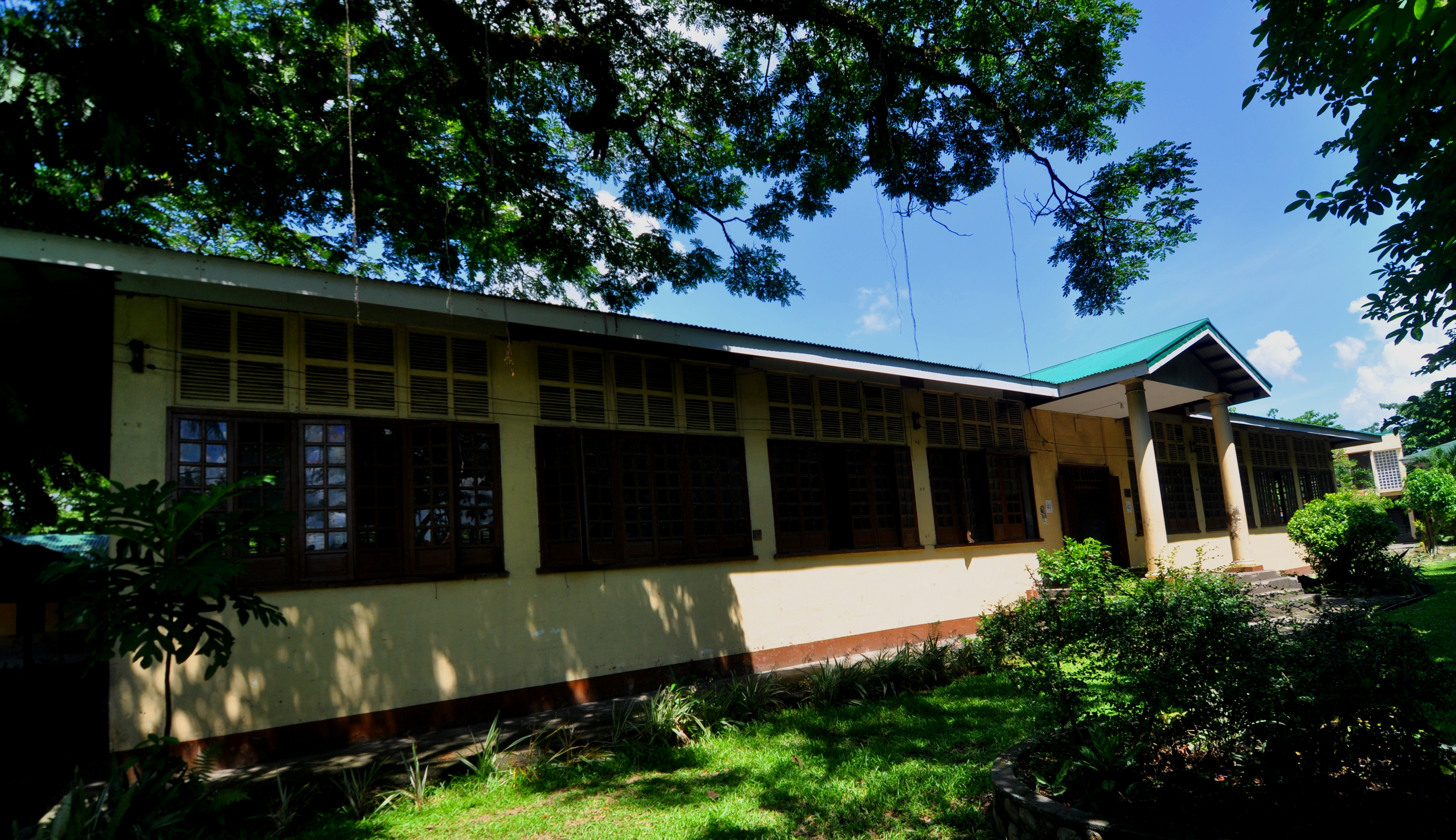
The old science building built in the late 1900s and renovated in 1946 with the help of the American government
