= List of historical markers of the Philippines in the Cordillera Administrative Region =

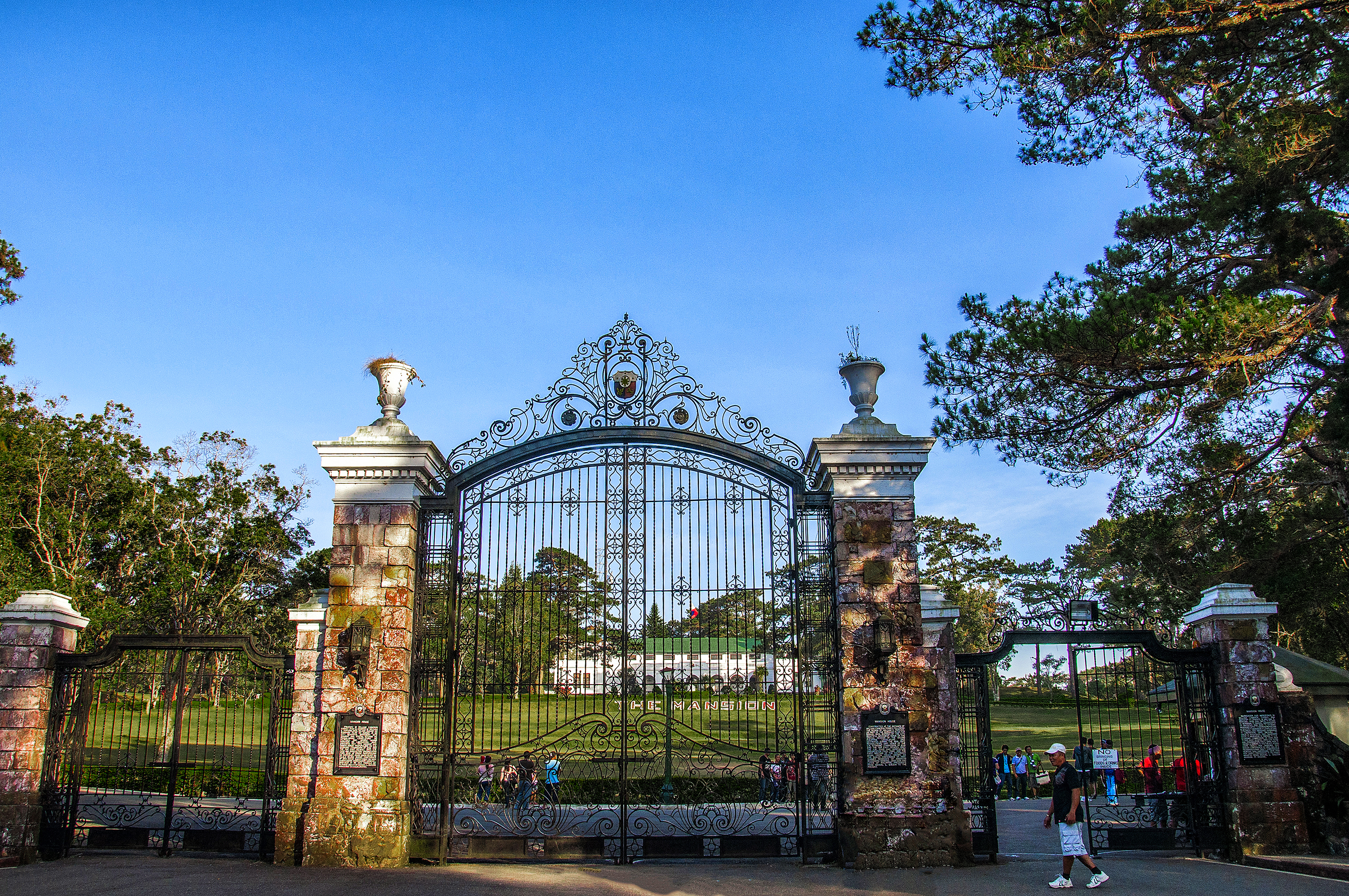
Gates of the Mansion House in Baguio. The markers are in Ilocano, Filipino, and English.

This list of historical markers installed by the National Historical Commission of the Philippines (NHCP) in the Cordillera Administrative Region (CAR) is an annotated list of people, places, or events in the region that have been commemorated by cast-iron plaques issued by the said commission. The plaques themselves are permanent signs installed in publicly visible locations on buildings, monuments, or in special locations.

While many Cultural Properties have historical markers installed, not all places marked with historical markers are designated into one of the particular categories of Cultural Properties.

The first historical marker in the Ilocano language was unveiled in 2009 for the Mansion House, Baguio.

For former NHCP Chairperson Maria Serena Diokno, the presence of the historical marker affirmed the historical significance of the City Hall site in Baguio against alterations on the said site under the National Cultural Heritage Act. The historicity was affirmed despite the lack of resolutions or consultations regarding the historical significance of the site.

This article lists 38 markers from the Cordillera Administrative Region, including seven that are part of the Philippine Nationhood Trail markers series.

== Abra ==
This table lists three markers from the province of Abra.

Marker title	Description	Location	Language	Date issued	Image
Ignacio Villamor y Borbon	Jurist, author, and educator. President of the University of the Philippines in 1915.	Bangued	Filipino	February 23, 1983	
Quintin Paredes (1884–1973)	Lawyer and statesman. Served as senate president from March to April 1952.	Quintin Paredes Ancestral House, Bangued	Filipino	February 23, 2013	
Society of the Divine Word	Established its first Philippine mission in Bario Cagutungan (now San Isidro) on August 23, 1909	Tayum	Filipino		

== Apayao ==
There are no markers from the province of Apayao.

== Benguet ==
This table lists 20 markers from the province of Benguet.

Marker title	Description	Location	Language	Date issued	Image
Baguio City Hall	First built in 1910 under E.W. Reynolds, the first mayor of the city. Where the Japanese flag was flown on December 27, 1941 to signal their occupation.	Baguio City Hall, Baguio	Filipino	September 2, 2009	
Baguio Country Club	Established by William Cameron Forbes in 1905. Judge Roman Ozaeta became first Filipino president in 1957.	Baguio Country Club, Baguio	Filipino, English	February 18, 2005	
Baguio Teachers' Camp	Used as a vacation site for teachers. Established on December 11, 1907. Formerly known as O-Ring-Ao.	Teachers' Camp, Baguio	Filipino	2008	
Ang Bell House at Bell Amphitheater (Note: Bell House and Bell Amphitheater)	Built as a vacation house of American governor-generals.	Camp John Hay, Baguio City	Filipino, English	October 25, 2023	
Benguet State University	Started as a farm school in 1916. Spearheaded secondary and agricultural indigenous education.	Centennial Park, Benguet State University, La Trinidad, Benguet	Filipino	September 27, 2016	
Brent School	Founded in 1909 by Bishop Charles Henry Brent as Baguio School for Boys.	Brent School, Baguio	Filipino, English	2002	
Casa Vallejo	Built in 1909 to house the workers of Baguio.	Casa Vallejo	Filipino	September 20, 2019	
Dating Kinatatayuan ng Akademya Militar ng Pilipinas (Note: Former Site of Philippine Military Academy)	Became the site of the Philippine Military Academy from June 15, 1936 until December 12, 1941.	Teachers' Camp, Baguio	Filipino, English,	February 19, 1994	
Dating Kinatatayuan ng Constabulary School (Ngayo'y Philippine Military Academy) (Note: Former Site of Constabulary School (Now Philippine Military Academy))	Became the site of the Philippine Constabulary School from 1908 to 1935 and 1947 to 1950.	Camp Henry T. Allen, Baguio	Filipino	February 17, 1996	
Dominican Hill and Retreat House (1915)	Built as a Dominican retreat house, became the refuge of Dominican priests and their families during WWII.	Dominican Hill, Baguio	Filipino	September 1, 2014	
Easter College	Established in 1906 by Charles Henry Brent for the schooling of children from Mountain Province. Became a Japanese outpost during WWII.	Easter College, Brgy. Pinget, Baguio	Filipino	December 12, 2017	
Gusali ng Korte Suprema sa Baguio (Note: Building of Supreme Court in Baguio)	Summer sessions started in 1910; current building dates back to 1964	Supreme Court, Baguio City	Filipino	August 24, 2026	
Kampo ng mga Guro (Teachers' Camp)	Used as a vacation site for teachers. Known before by the Igorots as O-Ring-Ao	Teachers' Camp Rd. Teachers' Camp, Baguio	Filipino	Between May 6–15, 1968	
Mansion House	Constructed in 1908 to be used as a summer residence of the chief-executive.	Mansion House Site, Baguio	English	1951	
Mansion House	Constructed as part of the Burnham plan of Baguio. Inspired by the city beautiful movement.	Mansion House Gate, Baguio	Ilocano, Filipino, English	December 30, 2008	
Philippine Commission's First Session in Baguio	Site where Baguio was officially declared as the Summer Capital of the Philippines.	Gov. Pack Road, Baguio	English	1940	
Philippine Military Academy	Recognized as the successor to the Academia Militar of Barasoain, Malolos, Bulacan	Camp General Gregorio del Pilar, Baguio	Filipino	May 21, 2019	
Signing of the Japanese Capitulation Document	Where the document was signed for the surrender of the Japanese Imperial Forces in the Philippines.	Camp John Hay site, Baguio	English	1946	
United Church of Christ in the Philippines (UCCP Baguio)	One of the first Protestant churches in Northern Luzon, established on February 11, 1911.	UCCP Baguio, Baguio	Filipino	February 11, 2012	
United States Embassy Residence Baguio	Erected in 1940. Occupied by the Japanese, but they were forced out later further to the mountains.	Camp John Hay, Baguio	English	September 3, 2005	

== Ifugao ==
This table lists five markers from the province of Ifugao.

Marker title	Description	Location	Language	Date issued	Image
Bantayog sa Kiangan; Lalawigang Bulubundukin (Note: Kiangan Monument: Mountain Province)	Where Gen. Tomoyuki Yamashita surrendered to the joined forces of Filipino and American troops in 1945.	Kiangan	Filipino	1973	
Ifugao Rice Terraces	The highest, best built, and most extensive stone-walled terraces. Covers nearly 400 square kilometers.	Banaue	English	1940	
Ang Labanan sa Mayoyao (Note: The Battle of Mayoyao)	Last battle between the Japanese and combined Filipino and American forces before Gen. Yamashita's surrender in Kiangan, Ifugao.	Mt. Nagchayan Ridge, Mayoyao	Filipino	2008	
Pook na Unang Pinaglibingan ni Heneral Artemio Ricarte (Vibora) (Note: First Burial Site of General Artemio Ricarte (The Viper))	Where the "Viper" was buried on July 31, 1945. His remains were kept in a cave.	Hungduan	Filipino	November 30, 2002	
Surrender of General Yamashita	Where General Tomoyuki Yamashita surrendered to the US 6th Army September 2, 1945.	Kiangan	English	September 2, 1995	

== Kalinga ==
This table lists one marker from the province of Kalinga.

Marker title	Description	Location	Language	Date issued	Image
Heneral Emilio Aguinaldo (Lubuagan, Kalinga) (Note: General Emilio Aguinaldo (Lubuagan, Kalinga))	The town where Aguinaldo established his main headquarters from March 6 to May 17, 1900.	Lubuagan	Filipino	March 6, 2000	

== Mountain Province ==
This table lists nine markers from the Mountain Province.

Marker title	Description	Location	Language	Date issued	Image
Ambayuan (Bayyo); Landas ng Pagkabansang Pilipino, 1899 (Note: Ambayuan (Bayyo): Philippine Nationhood Trail, 1899)	Where Aguinaldo passed on December 6, 1899, from Mount Polis to Banaue.	Barangay Bayyo, Bontoc	Filipino	May 6, 2025	
Bontoc; Landas ng Pagkabansang Pilipino, 1899 (Note: Bontoc: Philippine Nationhood Trail, 1899)	Where Aguinaldo passed on December 3-5, 1899.	Bontoc Municipal Hall, Bontoc	Filipino	May 5, 2025	
Bundok Polis; Landas ng Pagkabansang Pilipino, 1899 (Note: Mount Polis: Philippine Nationhood Trail, 1899)	Where Aguinaldo passed on December 6-7, 1899.	Mount Polis, Bontoc	Filipino	May 6, 2025	
Kayan; Landas ng Pagkabansang Pilipino, 1899 (Note: Kayan: Philippine Nationhood Trail, 1899)	Where Aguinaldo passed on December 2, 1899.	Barangay Kayan West, Tadian	Filipino	May 3, 2025	
Mga Labanan sa Lias (Note: The Battles of Lias)	Site of the battles which fought against both the Spanish and the Japanese.	Lias, Barlig	Filipino	September 3, 1985	
Sagada; Landas ng Pagkabansang Pilipino, 1899 (Note: Sagada: Philippine Nationhood Trail, 1899)	Where Aguinaldo passed on December 3, 1899.	Junction of Tetepan Road and Sagada-Besao Road, Barangay Antadao, Sagada	Filipino	May 4, 2025	
Tadian; Landas ng Pagkabansang Pilipino, 1899 (Note: Tadian: Philippine Nationhood Trail, 1899)	Where Aguinaldo passed on December 2, 1899.	Barangay Población, Tadian	Filipino	May 3, 2025	
Talubin; Landas ng Pagkabansang Pilipino, 1899 (Note: Talubin: Philippine Nationhood Trail, 1899)	Where Aguinaldo passed on December 5-6, 1899.	Barangay Talubin, Bontoc	Filipino	May 6, 2025	
William Henry Scott; 1921-1993	Conducted an extensive study of ethnolinguistic groups in Cordillera. Incarcerated when Martial Law was imposed, 1972.	Saint Mary School of Sagada, Sagada	Filipino	December 8, 2021	

== See also ==
- List of Cultural Properties of the Philippines in the Cordillera Administrative Region

== Bibliography ==
- National Historical Institute (1993). Historical Markers: Regions I-IV and CAR. National Historical Institute.
- National Historical Institute (2008). Historical Markers (1992 - 2006). National Historical Institute.
- A list of sites and structures with historical markers, as of 16 January 2012
- A list of institutions with historical markers, as of 16 January 2012
