= List of Cultural Properties of the Philippines in the Cordillera Administrative Region =

This list contains an overview of the government recognized Cultural Properties of the Philippines in the Cordillera Administrative Region. The list is based on the official lists provided by the National Commission on Culture and the Arts, National Historical Commission of the Philippines and the National Museum of the Philippines.

Cultural Property wmph identifier (Note: wmph is an internal identifier used by Wikimedia Philippines to identify the monument. This is not an official identifier, and only shown temporarily in the templates until the government creates an updated complete list.)	Site name	Description	Province	City or municipality	Address	Coordinates	Image
PH-15-0001	Teodoro Brillantes House		Abra	Tayum			Upload file
PH-15-0002	Tayum Church		Abra	Tayum			Upload file
PH-15-0003	Society of the Divine Word (SVD)		Abra	San Isidro			Upload Photo
PH-15-0004	Baguio City Hall		Benguet	Baguio	City Hall Drive	16°24′50″N 120°35′29″E	Upload file
PH-15-0005	Teachers’ Camp		Benguet	Baguio	Teacher's Camp Rd.	16°24′44″N 120°36′29″E	Upload file
PH-15-0006	Mansion House		Benguet	Baguio	Romulo Dr.	16°24′45″N 120°37′17″E	More images
PH-15-0007	Site of the Philippine Commission's First Session in Baguio		Benguet	Baguio			Upload Photo
PH-15-0008	Brent School		Benguet	Baguio			Upload file
PH-15-0009	Kiangan War Memorial Shrine (General Tomuyuki Yamashita Surrender)		Ifugao	Kiangan		16°46′46″N 121°04′53″E	Upload file
PH-15-0010	Ifugao Rice Terraces		Ifugao			16°55′32″N 121°03′42″E	Upload file

== See also ==
- List of historical markers of the Philippines in the Cordillera Administrative Region
