= Burnham Park (Baguio) =

Historic park at Baguio, Philippines

- Burnham Park Reservation
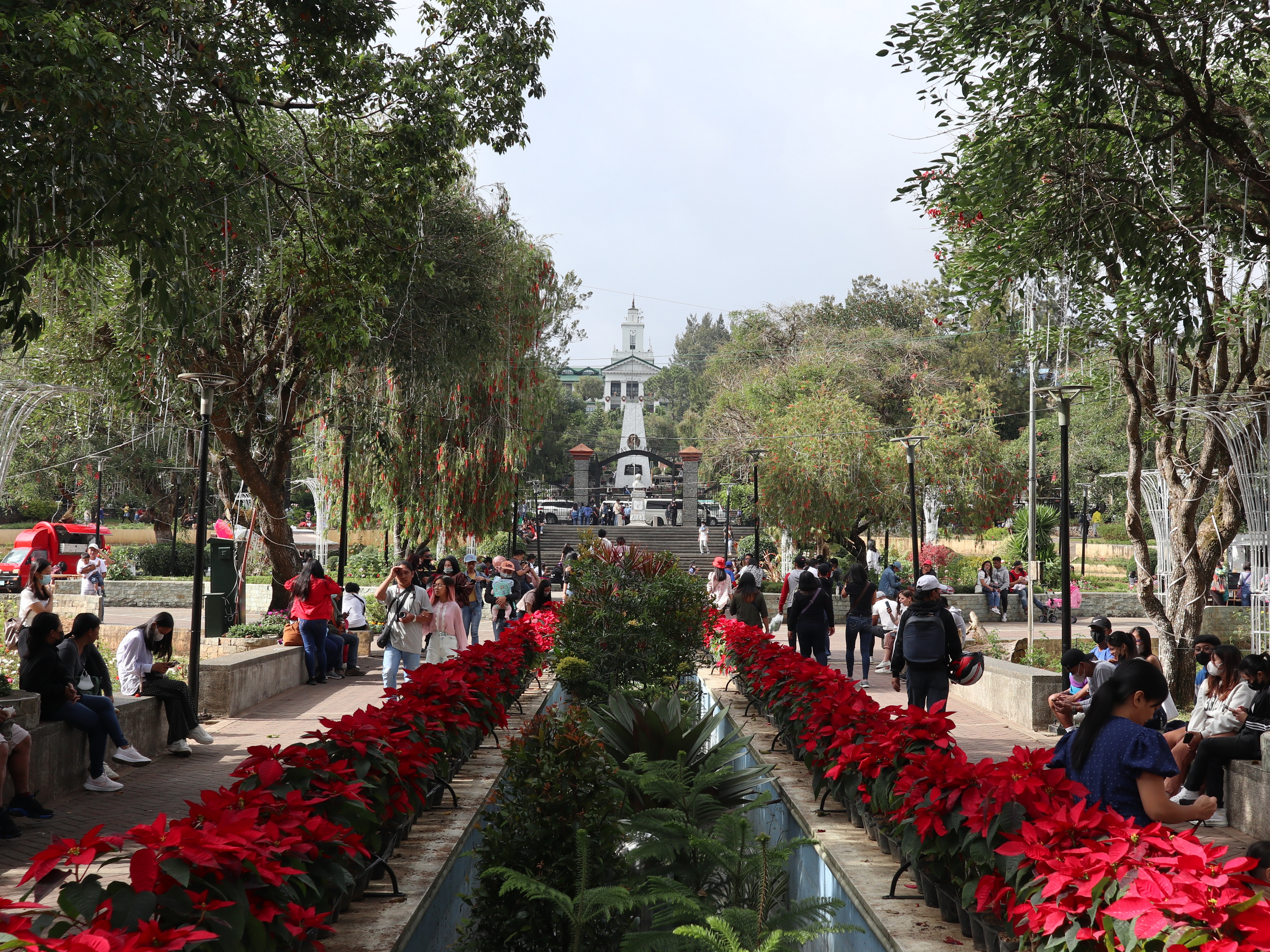
- Burnham Park Rose Garden with the Baguio City Hall in the background
- Interactive map of Burnham Park
- Type: Urban park
- Location: Legarda-Burnham-Kisad, Baguio, Benguet, Philippines
- Coordinates: 16°24′38″N 120°35′41″E
- Area: 32.84 hectares (81.1 acres)
- Established: August 6, 1925
- Founder: Leonard Wood
- Designer: Daniel Burnham
- Etymology: Daniel Burnham
- Owner: Department of Tourism
- Operator: Baguio City Environment and Parks Management Office
- Status: Open all year
- Plants: 2,600 trees (2015)
- Species: 72 plants

Burnham Park, officially known as the Burnham Park Reservation, is a historic urban park located in downtown Baguio, Philippines. It was designed by eponymous American architect and Baguio city planner, Daniel Burnham.

== Design ==
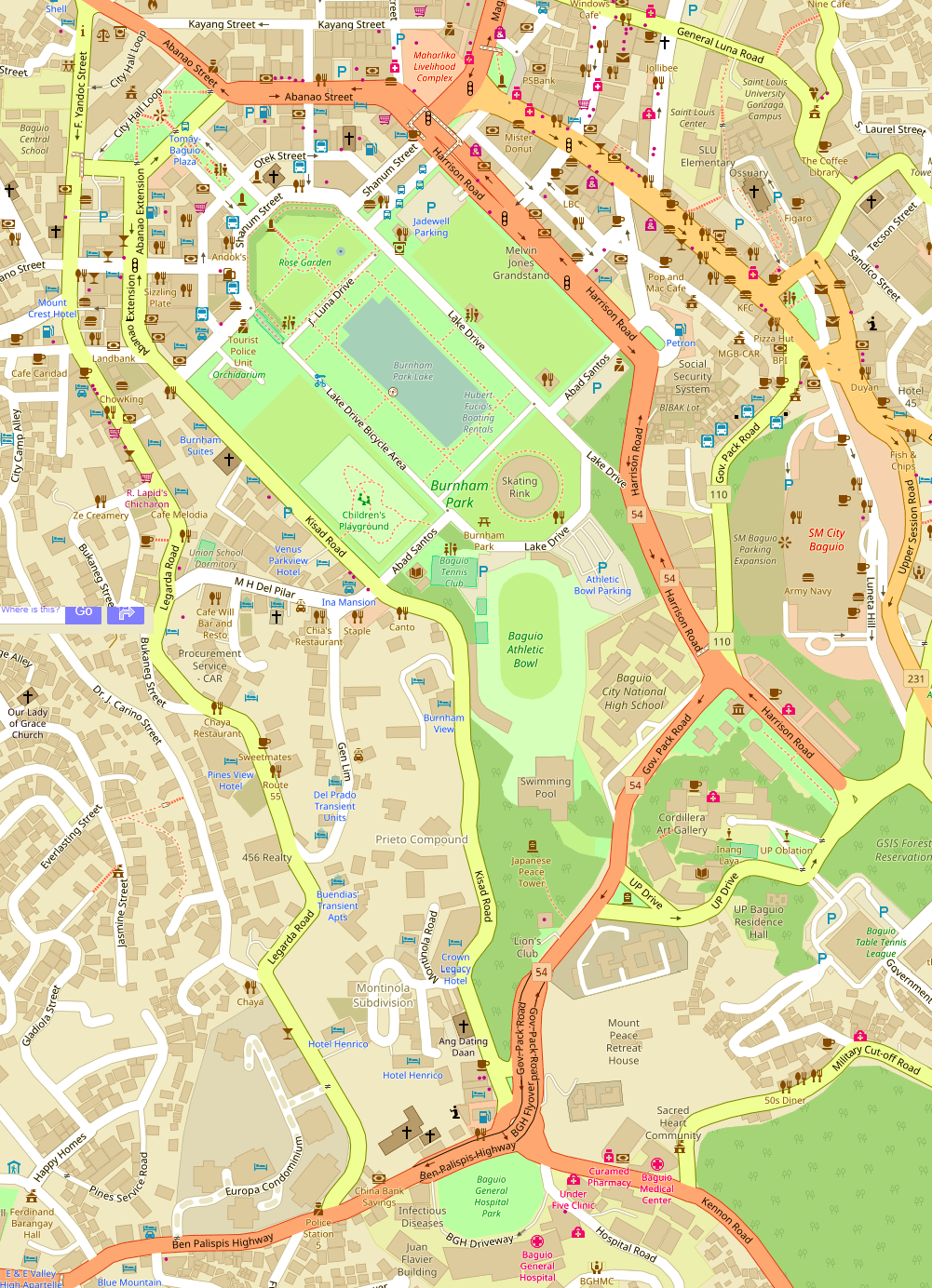
Burnham Park layout

Burnham Park was built on the grassy valley called "Baguio meadow" of the Ibaloi settlement of Kafagway, present-day downtown Baguio. The park was envisioned by American architect Daniel Hudson Burnham as part of a larger plan for the city of Baguio in 1905. After having presented the preliminary plans for Baguio and the capital city of Manila, Burnham left the task of interpreting such plans to William E. Parsons.

Burnham's role in establishing the park is acknowledged through a bust bearing his likeness and a plaque located at one end of the park.

The park's design is influenced from the City Beautiful movement; It has a small pond or lagoon situated at the green space's center and has regimented rows of grass and sidewalk. According to the Baguio Heritage Foundation in 2014, only the open field often used for football and the Melvin Jones Grandstand adhere to Burnham's original design for the park.

== Administration ==
=== History ===
Management history of Burnham Park
- Until 1981 : Baguio City Government
- 1981–1989: Philippine Tourism Authority
- 1989–1994: National Parks Development Committee
- 1994–1995: Philippine Tourism Authority
- 1995–present: Baguio City Government

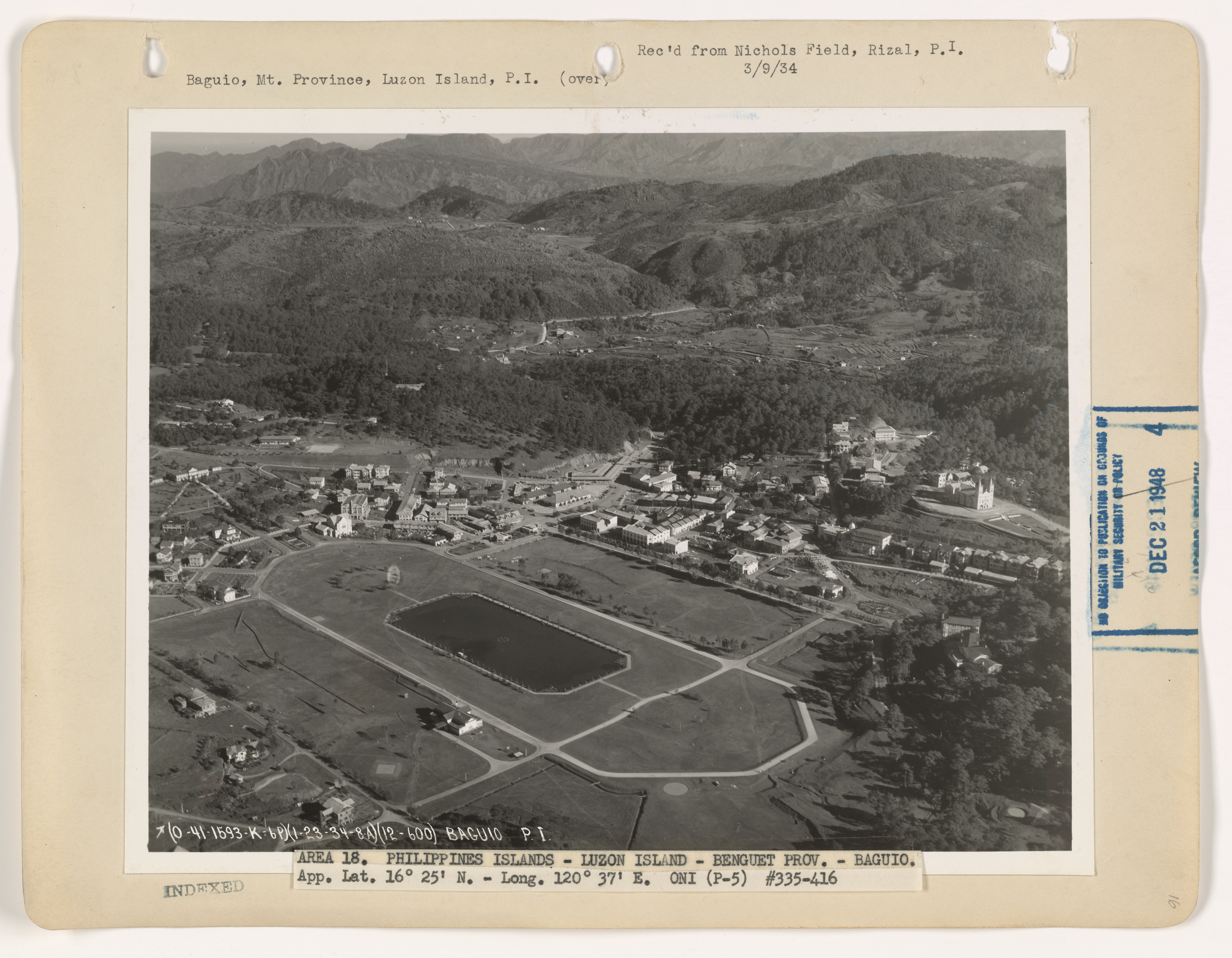
Aerial view of Baguio showing Burnham Park, 1937

Burnham Park's title belongs to the Department of Tourism while Baguio's City Environment and Parks Management Office (CEPMO) is responsible for the maintenance and operation of the park. The rules and regulations of the park is stated in Administrative Order 21 of 2015 which includes provisions against smoking and drinking alcoholic beverages as well as selling services (including massage, manicure, pedicure, and tattooing) within the park.

The city government of Baguio has been in charge of the administration, maintenance, and management of the park since February 10, 1995 when Executive Order No. 244 issued by President Fidel Ramos transferred the responsibilities in operating the park to the Baguio local government from the Philippine Tourism Authority (PTA). Through Executive Order No. 695 by President Gloria Macapagal Arroyo the Baguio local government was given full control to Burnham Park on January 10, 2008 by transferring PTA's power of control and further development of the park to the city government.

The area occupied by Burnham Park was reserved for park purposes on August 6, 1925 through Proclamation No. 64 of Governor General Leonard Wood. A portion of the park was separated from the Burnham Park Reserves for the purpose of hosting a public high school (Baguio City National High School) through Proclamation No. 401 issued by President Elpidio Quirino on June 27, 1953.

The park was first ceded to the PTA from the Baguio city government through Presidential Decree No. 1762 issued by Ferdinand Marcos on January 6, 1981 and Proclamation No. 2144 on December 9, 1981 also by Marcos for "tourism development purposes". For five years the park was run by the National Parks Development Committee (NPDC) from March 10, 1989 to March 10, 1994 following a signing of a memorandum of agreement between NPDC and the PTA. After that period the administration of the park was reverted to the PTA before it was transferred to the Baguio city government in 1995.

Bills have been filed in the Philippine House of Representatives to revert the park's control back to the national government and declare Burnham Park as a national park, but none has been passed as of 2018.

In 2025, the Tourism Infrastructure and Enterprise Zone Authority (TIEZA) announced a P500-million redevelopment of the Burnham Park, which includes improvements to the children’s playground, the Rose Garden and the areas surrounding the lake. An initial funding of around Php 100 million was earmarked for the rehabillitation of Burnham Lake. The refurbished lake, along with its boating operations, was reopened on September 1, 2026.

=== Clusters ===
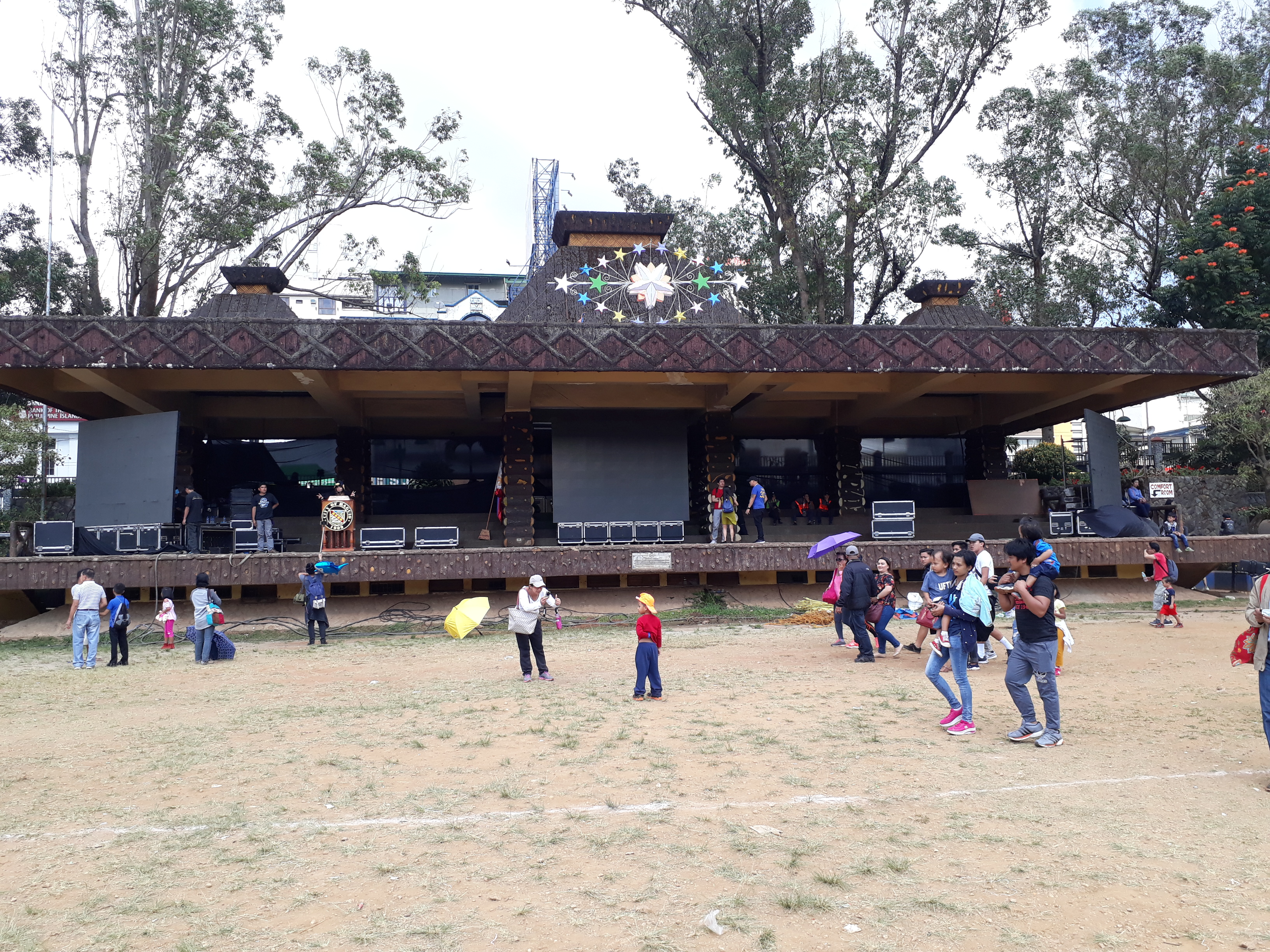
Melvin Jones Grandstand

Burnham Park has twelve designated clusters as of 2018.:

- Athletic Bowl
- Burnham Lagoon
- Children's Playground
- Igorot Garden
- Japanese Peace Tower
- Melvin Jones Grandstand
- Orchidarium
- Picnic Grove
- Pine Trees of the World
- Rose Garden
- Skating Rink
- Sunshine Park

== Features ==
=== Athletic Bowl ===
The Baguio Athletic Bowl is a track and field facility within Burnham Park. The Athletic Bowl area hosts an archery range and a nursery where the park administration grow seedlings.

=== Burnham Lake ===
Burnham Lake
- Burnham Lagoon; City Pond (former)
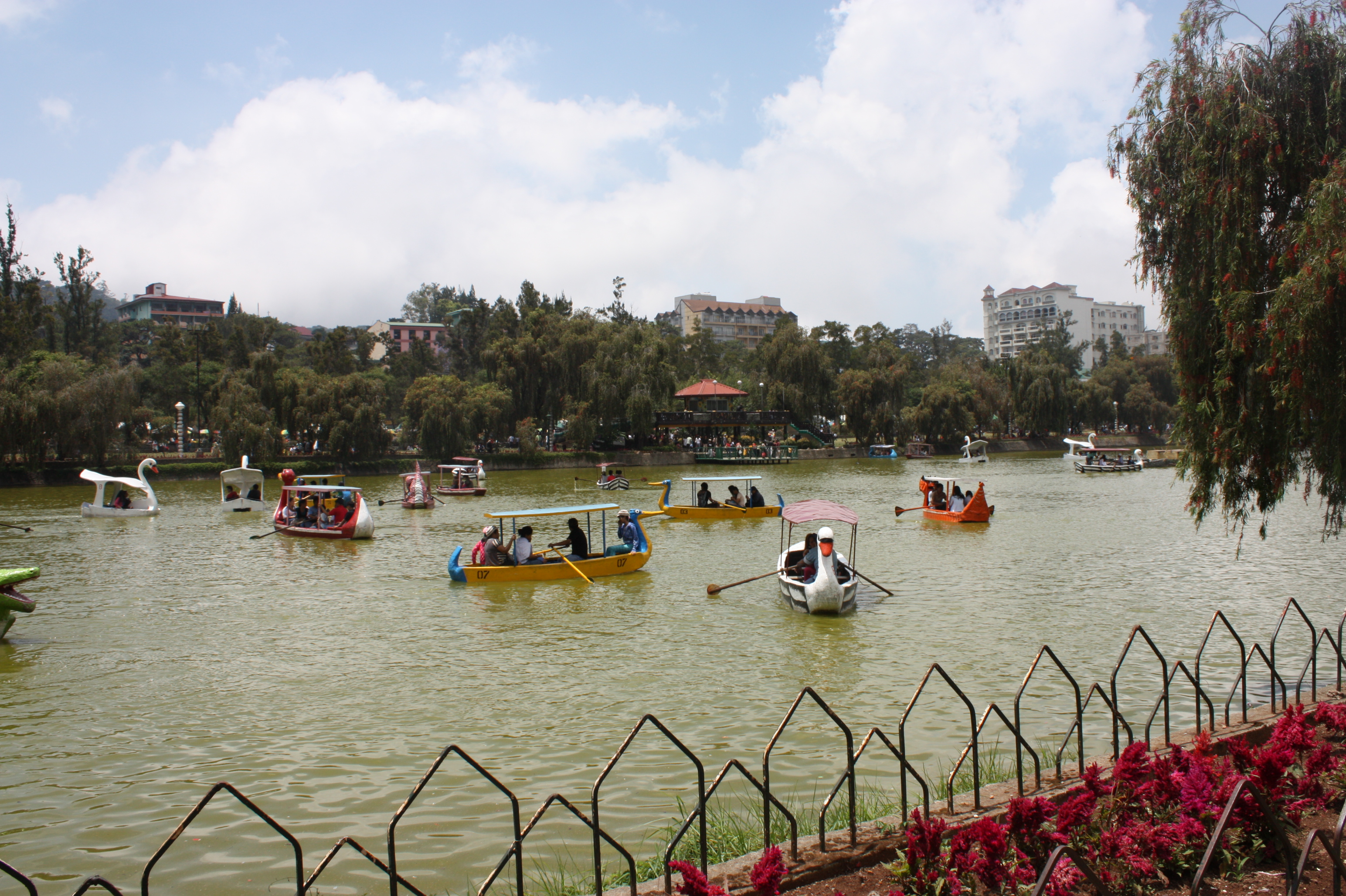
- Tourists canoeing in the lake in 2009
- Interactive map of Burnham Lake
- Coordinates: 16°24′40″N 120°35′40″E
- Type: Artificial lake
- First flooded: 1900s-1910s
- Average depth: 3.04 m (10.0 ft)
- Water volume: 34,000 m^{3} (1,200,000 ft^{3})

Burnham Lake, formerly known as the City Pond, is about a century-old man-made lake situated at the center portion of Burnham Park. In early 2013, it underwent dredging which saw the removal of a meter (3.28 feet) thick silt sitting on the lake's bed. It was also dredged in 1994. After the 2013 dredging, the lake's volume is 34,000 cubic meters (1,200,000 ft^{3}). The depth of the body of water is about 3.04 meters (10.0 ft). Boat rentals are available in the lake catering to tourists and residents.

Tilapia, carp and koi are among the fauna of the lake. The color of the water can be dark to reddish brown at times especially during the summer season due to growth of algae and constant stirring of the water by boaters causes mud, algae, and other materials in the lake to be suspended which contributes to the water color.

=== Gardens and other leisure areas ===
Burnham Park hosts a children's playground on its western portion. Government of Baguio and SM Prime Holdings Inc. signed a Memorandum of Agreement (MOA) on the improvement and rehabilitation of the Children's Playground inside Burnham Park.

The Orchidarium, also on the park's west side is a garden dedicated to orchids. Other types of flowers are also grown in the orchidarium. The garden hosts "The Orchid House" at its center which was constructed by Arnie's Garden, where flower vendors sell their merchandise.

The Avong Ibaloi Heritage Garden is situated between the Orchidarium and the Children's Park. The area was designated as a heritage park through City Council Resolution 182 in 2010 as part of the city government's effort to preserve the culture of the Ibaloi people as well as acknowledge their role in the city's history.

The Igorot Park is a smaller park within Burnham Park which is a place where locals often play chess as early as the 1980s. The Garden is dominated by a Statue of the five main Igorot tribes: the Ibalois, Bontocs, Kalingas, Ifugaos and the Kankanaeys.

The Melvin Jones Grandstand and the adjacent open field is situated at the eastern portion of the park. The venue hosts concerts, parades and other activities while association football could also be played in the open field. Among the more notable events held in this area is the Mass presided by Pope John Paul II on February 22, 1981 as part of his papal visit to the Philippines from February 17–22, 1981 and the 12th Gong Festival in 2024.

The Rose Garden is at the northern entrance of Burnham Park where the bust of the park's namesake, Daniel Burnham stands. At its center is an amphitheater. Across the Burnham Park's rose garden gated entrance is Rizal Park, a small park that is sometimes considered part of Burnham Park. A dancing fountain was inaugurated in 2013 in the area.

South of Burnham Lake housed a public rink constructed where skate rentals are available. Further south is the Pine Trees of the World which is meant to feature pine tree species from different parts of the world though none of the foreign pines survived.

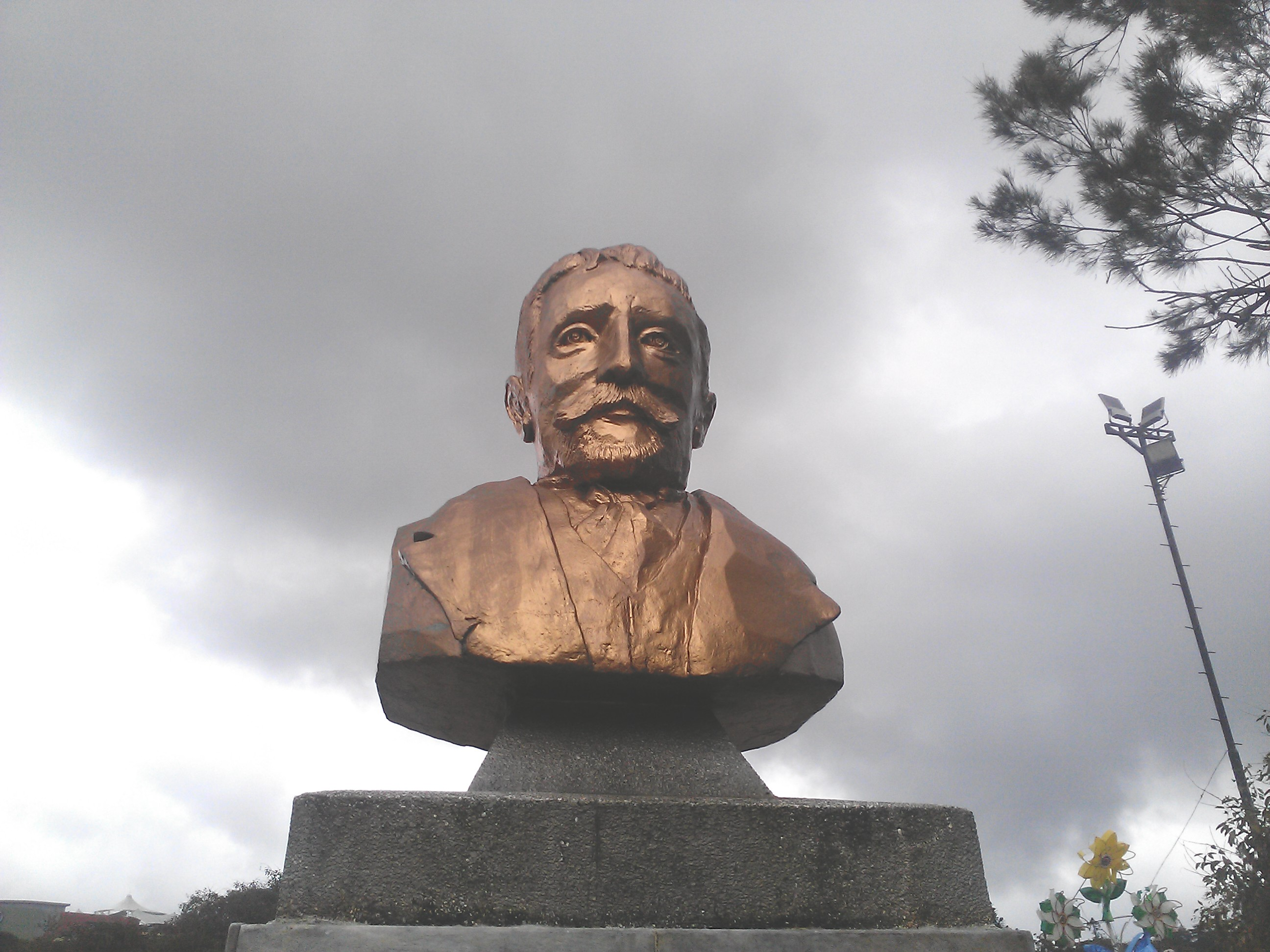
Bust of Daniel Burnham

View of the park from the City Hall

Rizal Park with the Baguio City Hall clock tower in the background

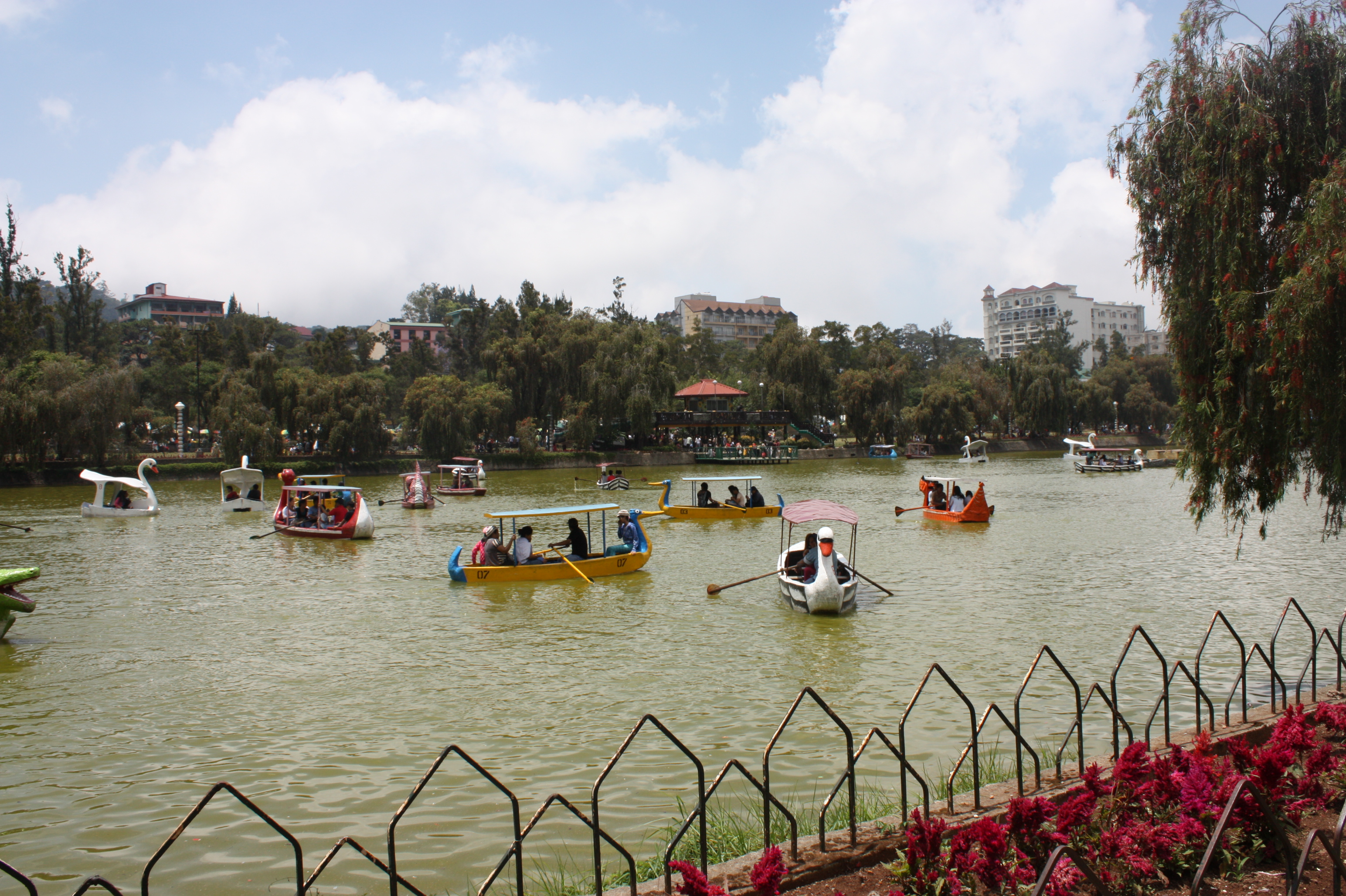
Burnham Park lake

== Flora ==
3,004 individual species were identified and recorded in Burnham Park according to an inventory and assessment of the park's flora in a journal published in 2009 by the University of the Philippines Baguio. Out of 72 species, 39 were herbs, 19 were trees, 8 were shrubs, and 6 were grass. The three most dominant species belong to the families of Myrtaceae, Moraceae and Bignoniaceae while two were identified as endemic in the Philippines namely Bermuda grass (Cynodon dactylon) and mutha (Cyperus rotundus). There are about 2,600 trees within the vicinity of the Burnham Park according to the Baguio's City Environment and Parks Management Office's 2015 inventory. Most of the park's trees are concentrated at the Skating Rink area with 161 trees.

2015 Tree Inventory By the City Environment and Parks Management Office (CEPMO) of Baguioc
Tree	Count
Benguet pine (Pinus kesiya)	372
Pink shower (Cassia javanica)	243
African tuliptree (Spathodea)	215
Agoho (Casuarina equisetifolia)	210
Alder (Alnus)	181
Eucalyptus	131
Others	~1248
Total	~2600

== Parking facilities controversy ==
A 3,000 vehicle capacity parking facility has been proposed to be built at the Melvin Jones Grandstand area of the park by the city government, but the plan has been met with opposition from heritage conservationists who gathered 15,000 signatures in a petition against the plan.
