= Baguio Botanical Garden =

Botanical garden in Baguio, Philippines

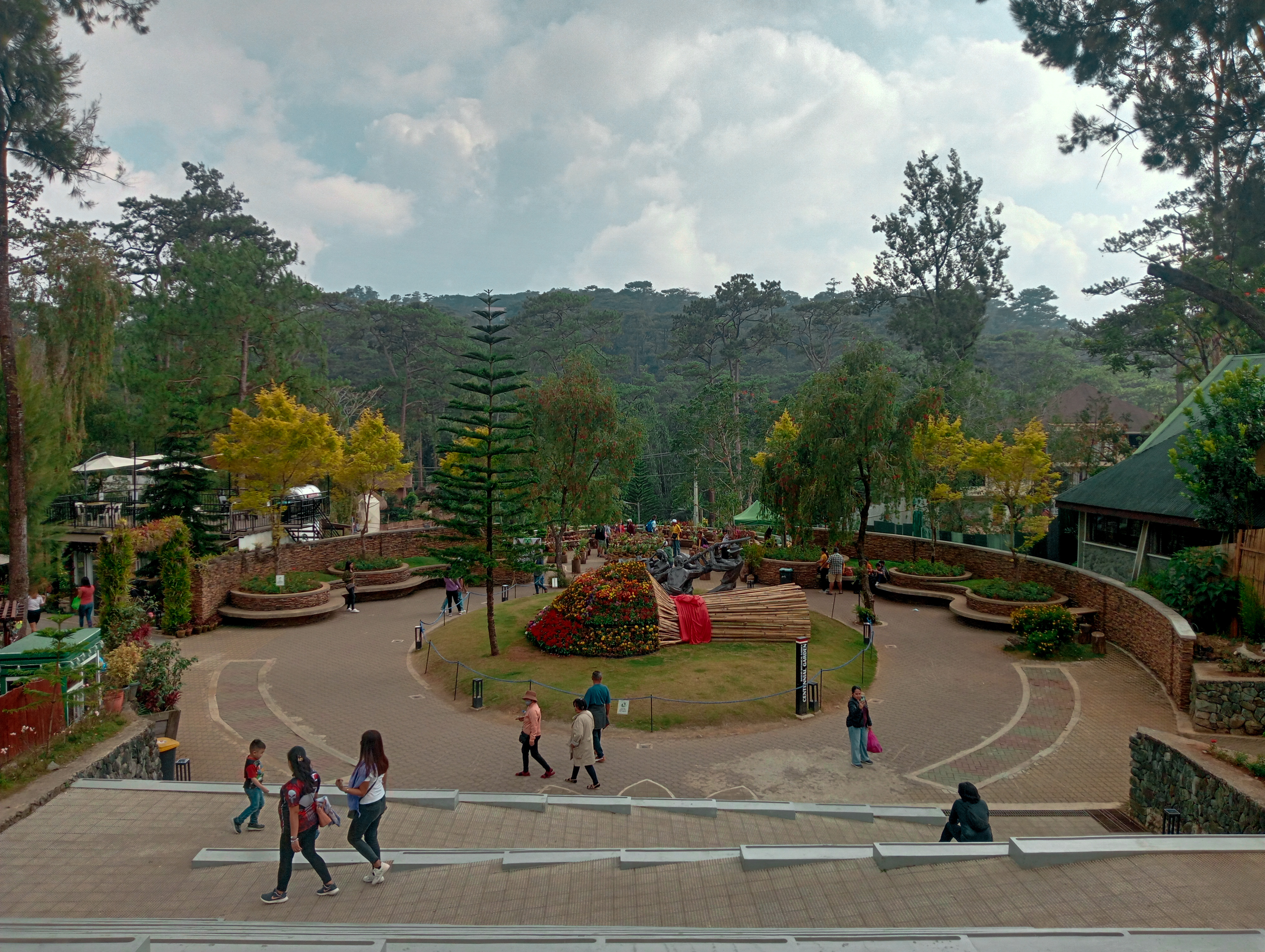
- An overview of the gardens
- Interactive map of Baguio Botanical Garden
- Type: Urban
- Location: Saint Joseph Village, Baguio, Benguet, Philippines
- Coordinates: 16°24′52″N 120°36′47″E
- Owner: Land Management Bureau
- Visitors: 100,000 monthly (in 2022)
- Open: 6AM-6PM
- Status: Open
- Collections: Dahlia, cactuses, and succulents

The Baguio Botanical Garden, formerly known as Imelda Park, is a botanical garden in Baguio, Philippines, located on Leonard Wood Road between Wright Park and Teacher's Camp.

== Names ==
The garden goes by a few different names, including:

- Botanical & Zoological Garden, the former name for the park when it was a zoo
- Centennial Park, for being "the Summer Capital" of the Philippines for 100 years
- Igorot Village, for the culture-inspired carvings, sculptures, and huts scattered around the park
- Imelda Park, for the former first lady

== History ==
The garden, which was previously a zoo, was renamed to the Imelda Park by Ferdinand Marcos for his wife in 1970.

The park closed for ten months in 2021 due to the COVID-19 pandemic. During that time, it underwent a renovation which made the park more aesthetic and added ramps.

== Features ==
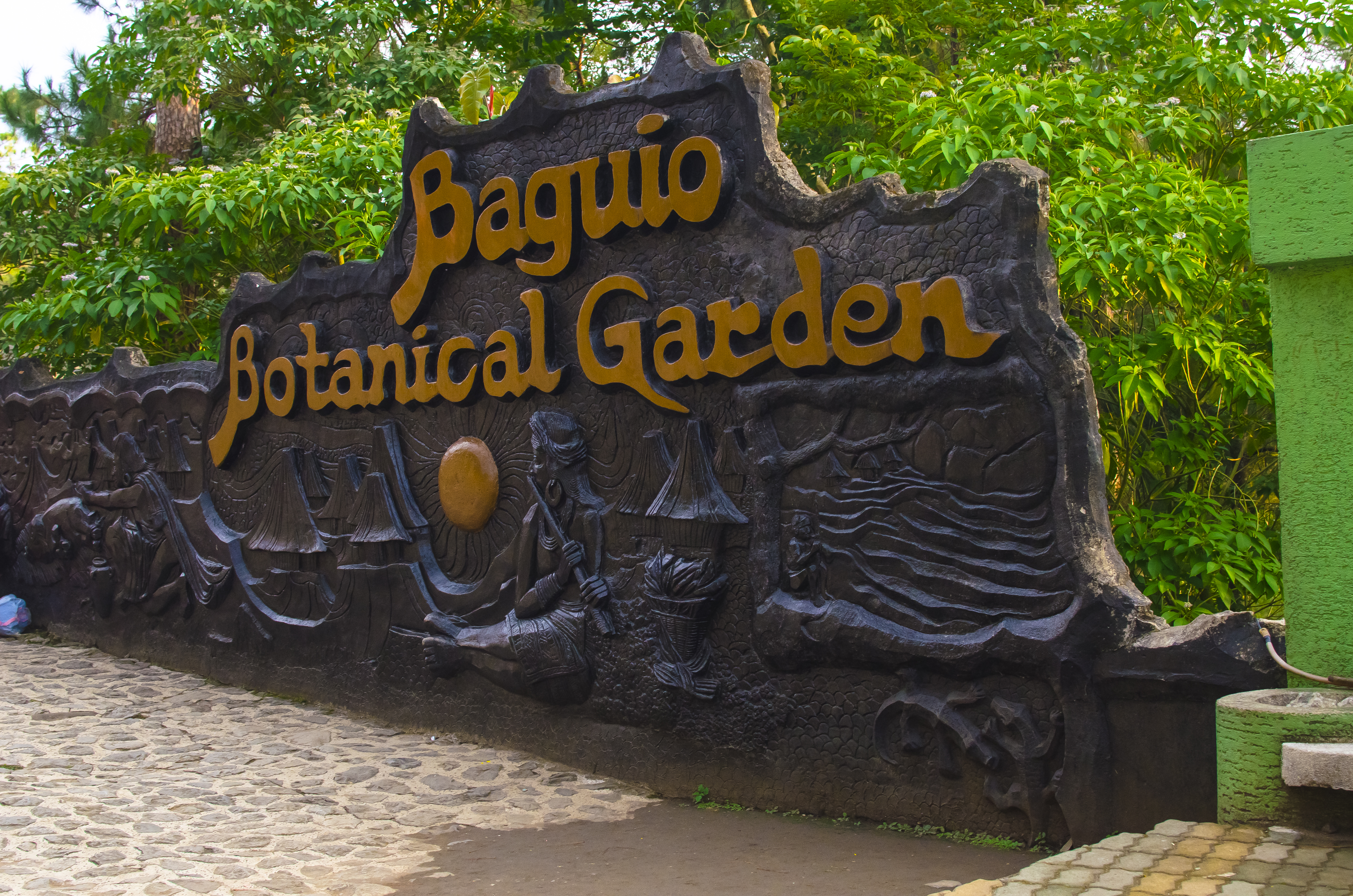
The sign at the entrance

The park has art galleries provided by the Baguio Arts Guild, and sculptures displaying the culture of the Igorot people. A statue by Ben Hur Villanueva commemorating the people who built Baguio can also be found.

The park also contains a friendship garden featuring the countries United States, China, Japan, South Korea, Canada, and Thailand, which contain elements of the country's culture, such as temples and statues. It also contains a sunflower farm and gardens spotlighting Dahlia, cactuses, marguerites, orchids, and succulents.

One of the garden's main attractions is a 150 m (490 ft) long tunnel which was dug out by Japanese Imperial Army soldiers during World War II for use as storage, treatment, and a bunker.

== See also ==
- List of botanical gardens and arboretums in the Philippines
