= Wright Park =

Wright Park may refer to:

- Wright Park (Baguio)
- Wright Park (Tacoma, Washington)
