= Casa Vallejo =

Historic hotel in Baguio, Philippines

- Casa Vallejo entrance

- Location within Luzon Location within Philippines

General information
- Location: Upper Session Road, Baguio, Philippines
- Coordinates: 16°24′34″N 120°36′02″E
- Named for: Salvador Vallejo
- Completed: 1909
- Opened: 1923 (as a hotel)

Other information
- Number of rooms: 24
- Number of restaurants: 1

Website
- casavallejohotel.com

Casa Vallejo is a historic hotel in Baguio, Philippines. Built in 1909, it is the oldest hotel in the city. It is also recognized as Baguio Centennial Commission as one of the 10 oldest institutions in the city. The hotel is located along Upper Session Road.

== History ==
Historical marker installed in 2019

Casa Vallejo prior to the 1920s, served as residence of Bureau of Public Works employees and was referred to as Dormitory 4. In 1917, the building was used as a German Prisoner of War detention center. The structure was built using of wood, galvanized iron, and sawali.

In 1923, the dormitory became a hotel. In 1927, Salvador Vallejo leased the hotel from the government. The building also served as a British and Indian refugee center in 1940. Casa Vallejo survived the carpet bombing by Imperial Japan in 1941 during World War II.

The Mountain Province High School (now the Baguio City National High School) used to be a tenant of the Casa Vallejo building prior to moving in Andebok in the 1950s.

In January 2014, the tenants of Casa Vallejo were issued an order of eviction by the National Commission on Indigenous Peoples (NCIP) to enforce the ancestral land claim by an Ibaloi family, causing concerns that the demolition of the building might occur. The crisis was averted after the NCIP orders the concerned parties to maintain the status quo.

Restaurant area inside the hotel

Casa Vallejo was recognized as a historic site, with the National Historical Commission of the Philippines unveiling a marker for the recognition on September 20, 2019.
