= List of botanical gardens and arboretums in the Philippines =

Botanical gardens in Philippines have collections consisting entirely of Philippines native and endemic species; most have a collection that include plants from around the world. There are botanical gardens and arboreta in many provinces, municipalities, and cities of Philippines, some administered by local governments and some are privately owned.

Name	Founded	Image	Size	Admission	Affiliation	Location	Coordinates
Arboretum of 101 Threatened Philippine Trees	2019				Ateneo de Manila University, Energy Development Corporation	Quezon City, Metro Manila	
Baguio Arboretum	October 2026		5 hectares (12 acres)	Baguio residents: Adults: ₱ 55; Students aged 13 and above, senior citizens, and PWDs: ₱ 27.50; Free for children aged 12 and below; Tourists: Adults and children aged 13 and above: ₱ 110; Children aged 12 and below: ₱ 27.50; Senior citizens and PWDs receive 20 percent discount		Baguio, Benguet	
Baguio Botanical Garden			5 hectares (12 acres)	Adults: ₱100; Children (4–12 years old), students, senior citizens: ₱50; Free for children 3 years and below		Baguio, Benguet	
Center for Tropical Conservation Studies (CENTROP) Arboretum	2020		0.7 hectares (1.7 acres)		Silliman University, Energy Development Corporation	Valencia, Negros Oriental	
Hidden Garden	1991		1.2 hectares (3.0 acres)	Free admission	Private	Vigan, Ilocos Sur	17°33′34.8″N 120°21′53.2″E
La Union Botanical and Zoological Garden	1996		20 hectares (49 acres)			San Fernando, La Union	
Makiling Botanical Gardens			300 hectares (740 acres)		University of the Philippines Los Baños	Laguna	
Manila Zoological and Botanical Garden	July 1959		5.5 hectares (14 acres)	Manila residents: Adults and children 3 years and up: ₱ 150; Students: ₱ 100; Tourists: Adults and children 3 years and up: ₱ 300; Students: ₱ 200; Senior citizens and PWDs receive 20 percent discount Free for children aged 2 and below		Malate, Manila	14.5647412°N 120.9886014°E
Mehan Gardens (Formerly Jardin Botanico)	1858		2.8 hectares (6.9 acres)			Arroceros Street, Manila, Manila	14.592451°N 120.98063°E
Ninoy Aquino Parks and Wildlife Center	July 1954		23.85 hectares (58.9 acres)	Adult: ₱30.00; Students: ₱15.00; Free for senior citizens and children 7 years and below		Diliman, Quezon City, Metro Manila	
Northwestern University Ecotourism Park & Botanic Gardens	2007		7.8 hectares (19 acres)		Northwestern University (Philippines)	Laoag, Ilocos Norte	
University of the Philippines Arboretum			16 hectares (40 acres)	Free admission	University of the Philippines	Diliman, Quezon City, Metro Manila	14°39′36″N 121°3′6″E
Washington SyCip Garden of Native Trees	2013		0.47 hectares (1.2 acres)	Free admission	University of the Philippines, Zuellig Group	Diliman, Quezon City, Metro Manila	
Pintô Arboretum	2021		0.2 hectares (0.49 acres)		Pintô Art Museum	Antipolo, Rizal	
UPIB-EDC BINHI Threatened Species Arboretum	December 2014		1 hectare (2.5 acres)	Free admission	University of the Philippines, Energy Development Corporation	Diliman, Quezon City, Metro Manila	
Victor O. Ramos Arboretum			4 hectares (9.9 acres)			Natividad, Pangasinan	

== See also ==
- List of natural parks of the Philippines
