= The Mansion (Baguio) =

Summer residence of the president of the Philippines

Mansion House
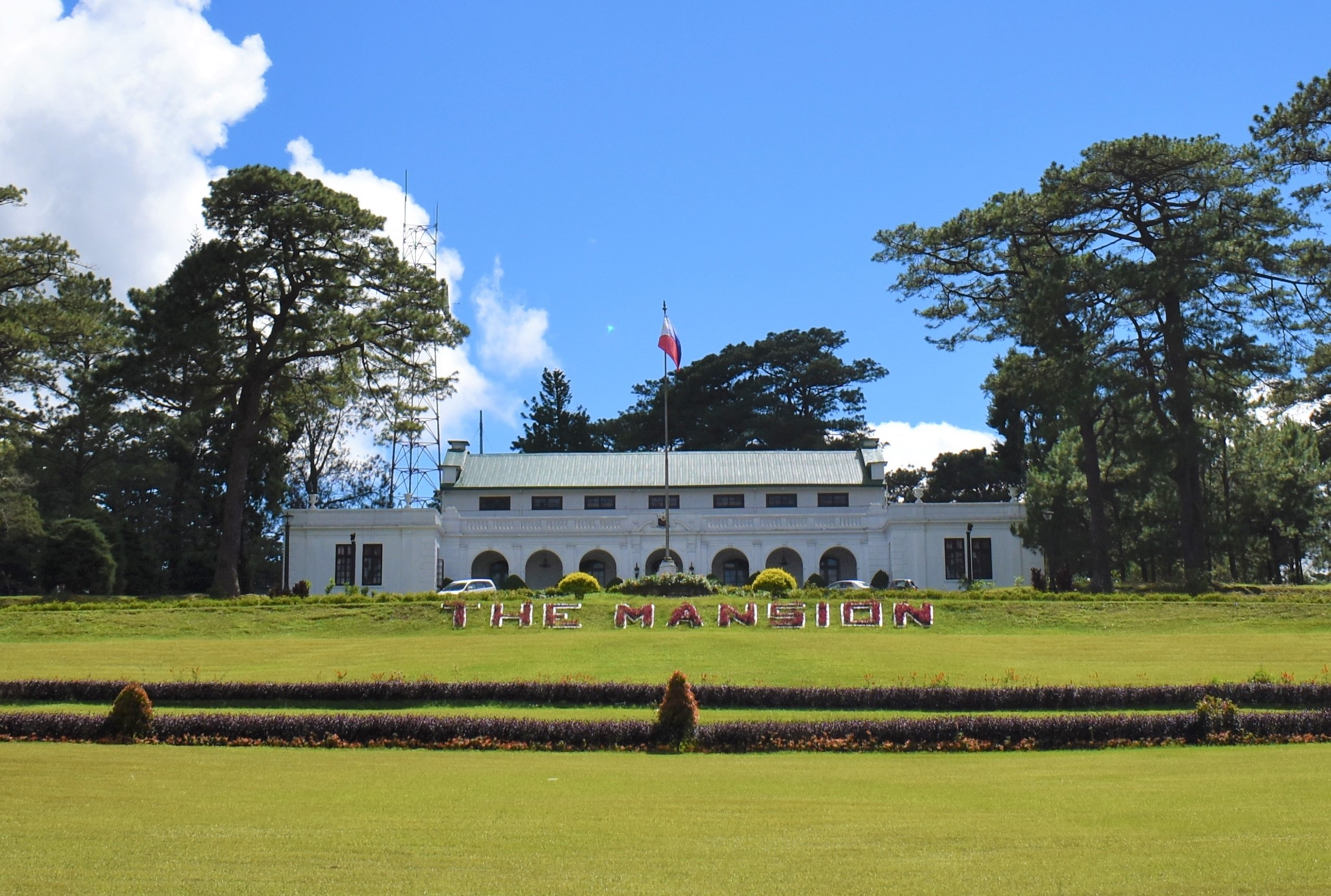
- Interactive map of the Mansion House area
- Alternative names: The Mansion

General information
- Location: Leonard Wood Road, Baguio 2600, Philippines
- Coordinates: 16°24′44″N 120°37′17″E
- Elevation: approx. 5,000 feet (1,500 m)
- Current tenants: Bongbong Marcos; President of the Philippines
- Inaugurated: 1908 (as presidential residence); 8 September 2024 (as public museum)
- Owner: Government of the Philippines

Design and construction
- Architect: William E. Parsons

The Mansion, also known as Mansion House, is the official summer palace of the President of the Philippines, located in the summer capital of the country, Baguio. It is situated around 5,000 feet (1,500 m) asl in the Cordillera Central Range of northern Luzon.

== History ==
Aerial view of The Mansion in 1923

The Mansion House was built in 1908 to serve as the official summer residence of the American Governor-General of the Philippines at the insistence of Governor-General James Francis Smith. It was named for the New England summer cottage of William Cameron Forbes, who succeeded as Governor-General in 1909. Architect William E. Parsons, based on preliminary plans by architect Daniel H. Burnham, the city planner of Baguio, designed the mountain retreat following tenets of the City Beautiful Movement. In 1910, the Second Philippine Legislature met at The Mansion House for three weeks.

With the inauguration of the Philippine Commonwealth in 1935, The Mansion House, along with Malacañang Palace in Manila, was turned over to the President of the Commonwealth. The high commissioner to the Philippines, successor to the governor-general as the highest American official in the country and representative of the United States government, then built the American Residence at John Hay Air Base, completed in 1940.

The structure was badly damaged during World War II and rebuilt in 1947. Since then, it has served as the holiday home and working office for each President during their visits to Baguio.

The Mansion House was also used as the venue of important events, such as the second session of the United Nations Economic Commission for Asia and the Far East (ECAFE) in 1947, the second session of the Food and Agriculture Organization in 1948, and the first meeting of the Southeast Asian Union (SEAU), more commonly known as the Baguio Conference of 1950, which was conceived and convened by President Elpidio Quirino. More recently, The Mansion House was used as a venue for international conferences.

On January 21, 1994, Conrado Balweg, the leader of the Cordillera People's Liberation Army, and his followers, who had been using The Mansion’s guesthouse as their headquarters since 1986, were removed from it by policemen without violence.

The residence was opened to the public on September 8, 2024.

== Description ==
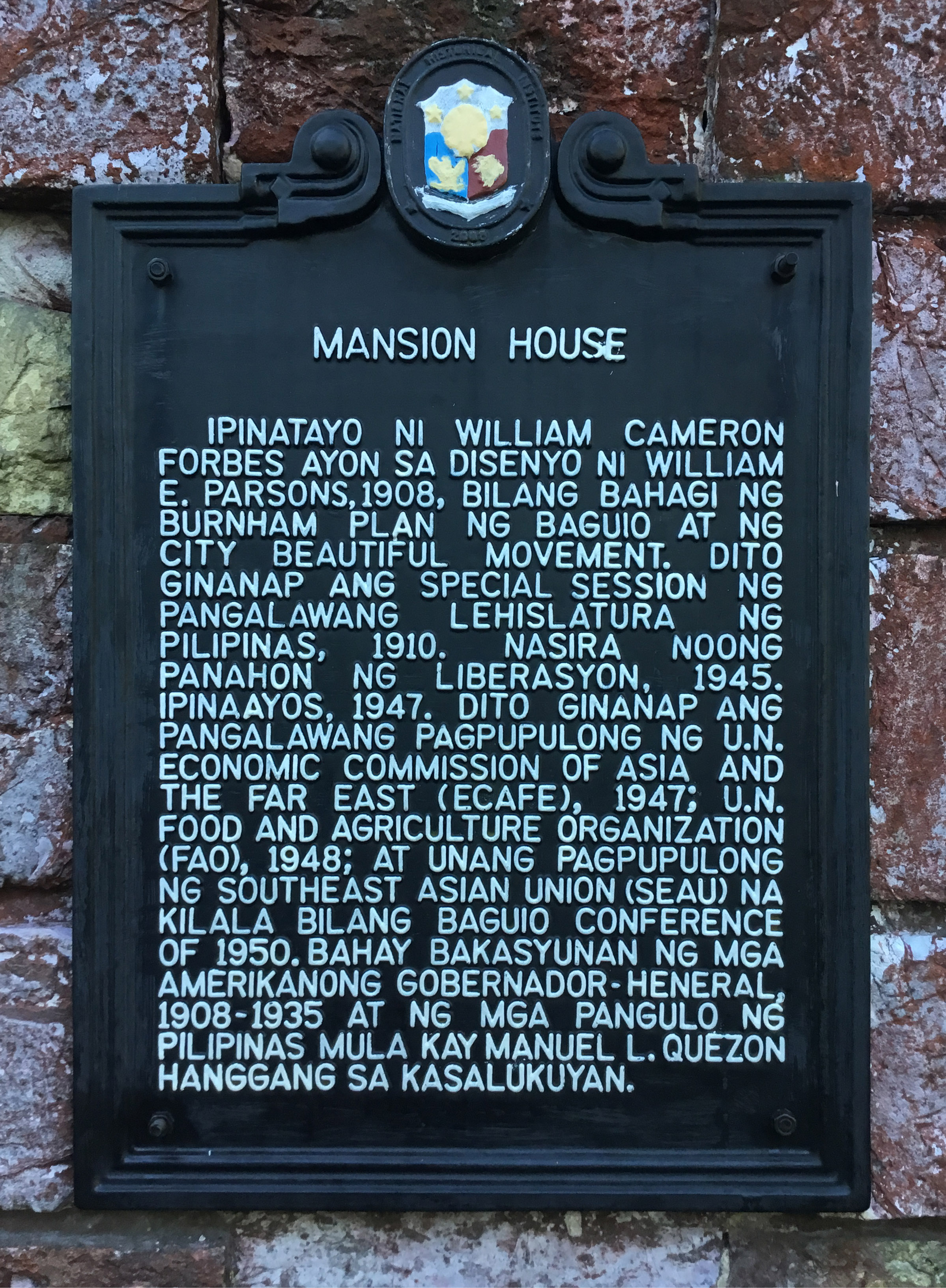
NHCP historical marker

The Mansion House consists of an elegant Spanish Colonial Revival building and a detached guesthouse. The elaborate front gate of ornate ironwork, was once rumoured to be a replica of the main gate of Buckingham Palace in London, but this has since been disproven. The front gate is still one of the most photographed features of the entire complex. The public may visit the inside of The Mansion House, which contains a museum featuring presidential memorabilia.

Across the road from The Mansion House is Wright Park, a quiet promenade with a long reflecting pool lined with agoho (Australian pine) trees. A long stairway leads visitors to the back, where ponies for children are available for hire. Dotted around the nearby hills are private holiday homes and small inns.

== Gallery ==
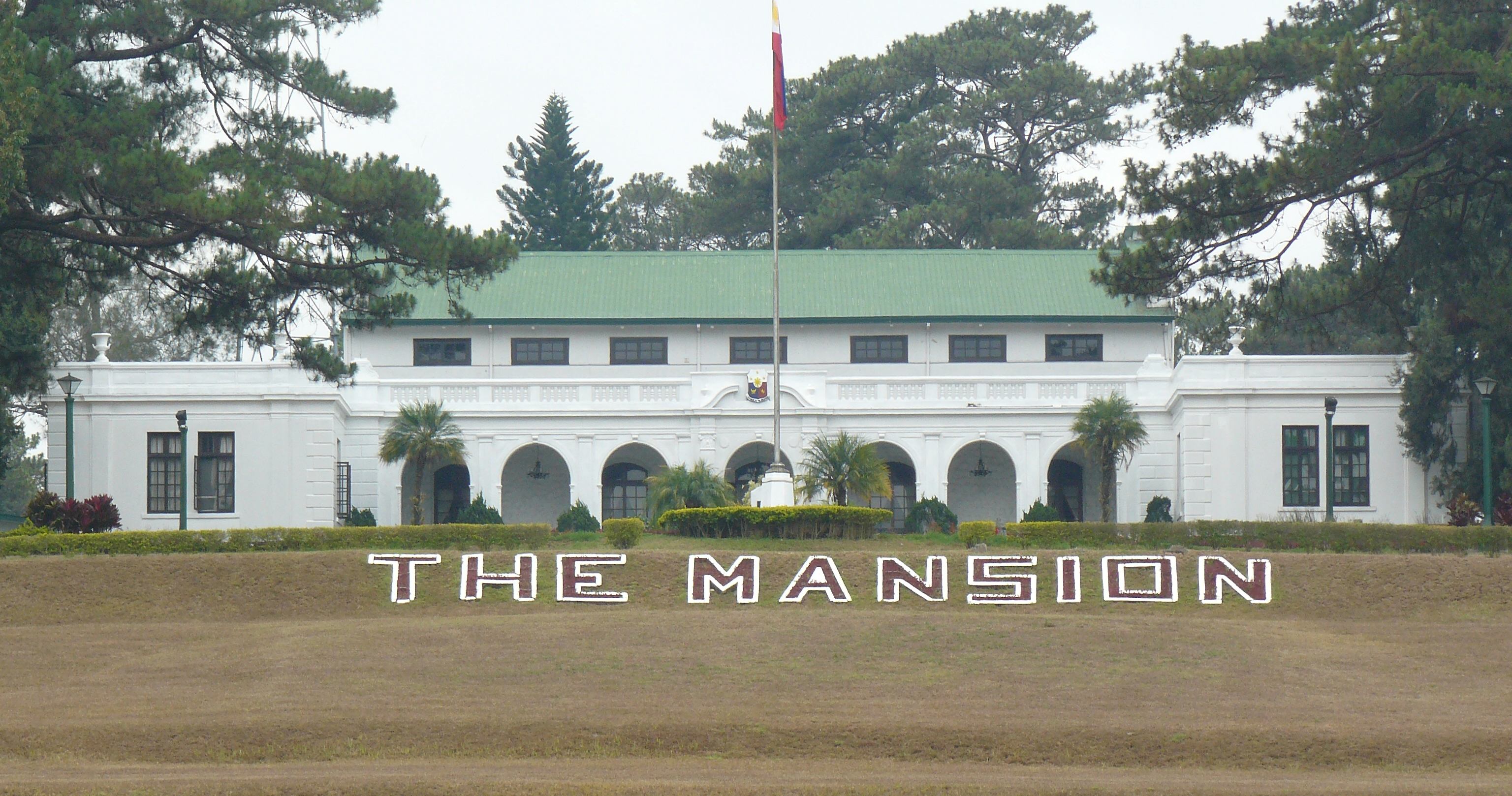
The Mansion House in 2010

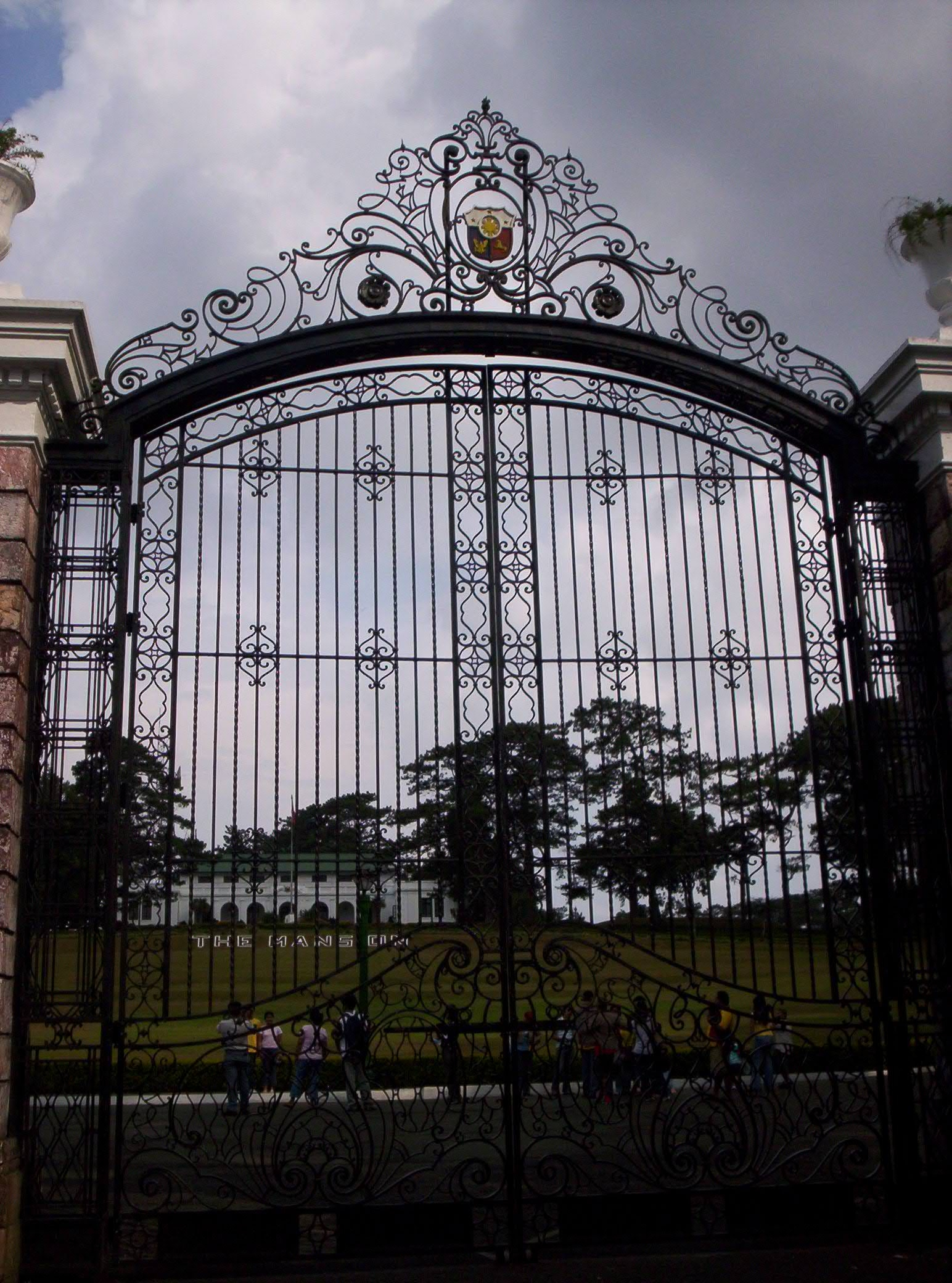
The front gate, topped by the coat of arms of the Philippines.

1951 historical marker installed in front of the main entrance

== See also ==
- Malacañang Palace
- Malacañang sa Sugbo
- Malacañang of the North
- Malacañang of the South
