= Summer Palace (disambiguation) =

Summer Palace is a Qing dynasty palace in Beijing, China.

Summer Palace may also refer to:

== Residences ==
- Summer Palace (Rastrelli), royal residences in St Petersburg, Russia built for Empresses Anna and Elizabeth
- Summer Palace of Peter the Great, royal residence in St. Petersburg for Peter the Great
- Episcopal Summer Palace, Bratislava, a palace in Bratislava, which houses the government of Slovakia
- Old Summer Palace, or Gardens of Perfect Brightness, a complex of palaces and gardens in present-day Haidian District, Beijing, China

== Other ==
- Summer Palace (2006 film), a 2006 Chinese-language film directed by Lou Ye
- Summer Palace (album), a 2008 album by UK band Sunny Day Sets Fire
- "The Summer Palace" (Succession), an episode of the television series Succession
