= Teachers Camp =

Teachers' training center in Baguio, Philippines

Baguio Teachers Camp
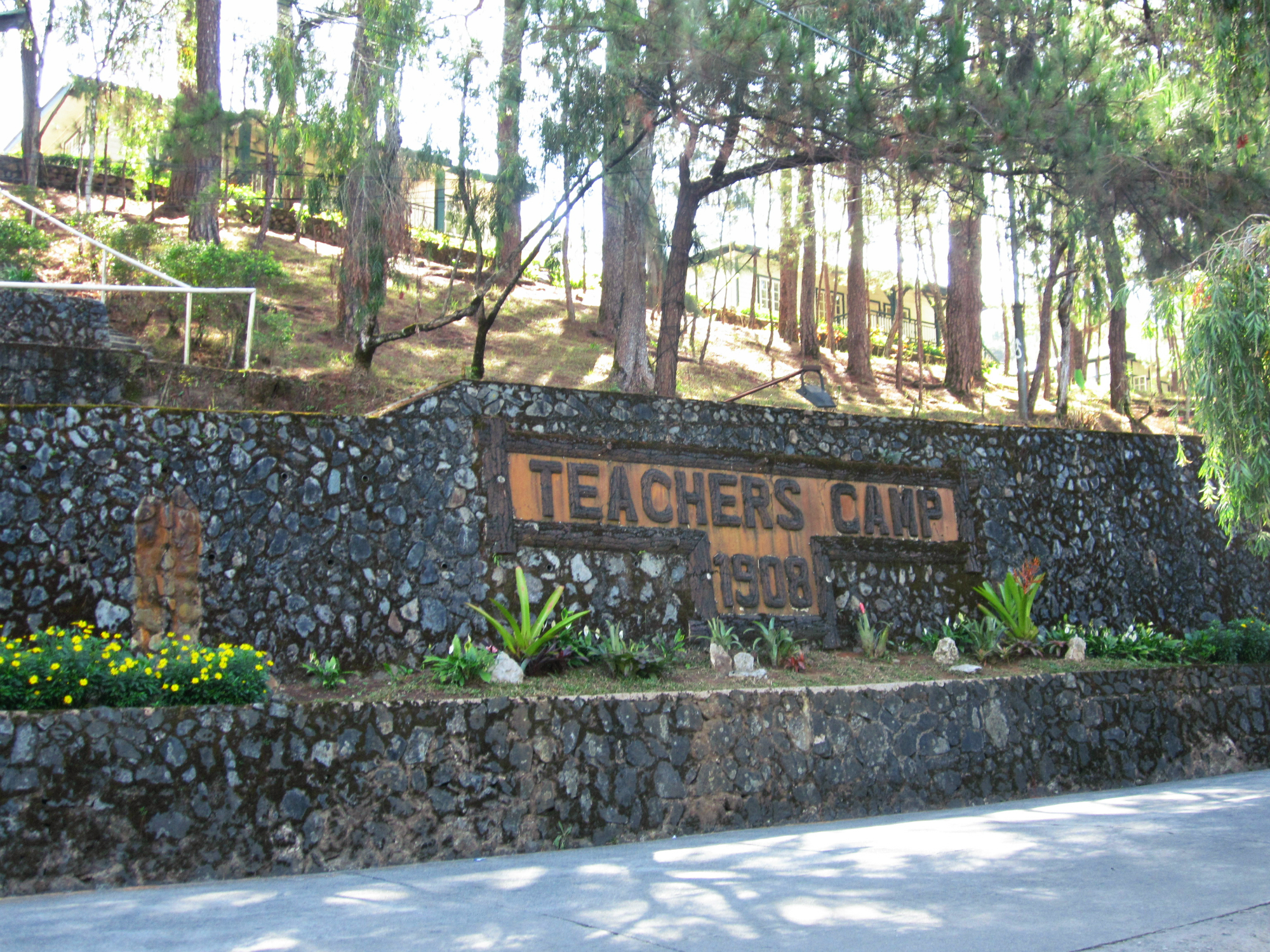
- Interactive map of Baguio Teachers Camp
- Location: Baguio, Philippines
- Coordinates: 16.41222°N 120.60806°E
- Opened: April 6, 1908; 118 years ago
- Founder: William Pack
- Administrator: Department of Education

The Baguio Teachers Camp (BTC), commonly referred to as Teachers Camp, is a teachers' training center and events venue located along Leonard Wood Road in Baguio, Philippines. It is a recognized heritage site by the Baguio city government since 2005 and the national government since 2008.

Established as a recreation area for teachers in the 1900s during the American colonial period, the site currently hosts the National Educators Academy of the Philippines (NEAP) of the Department of Education.

== History ==
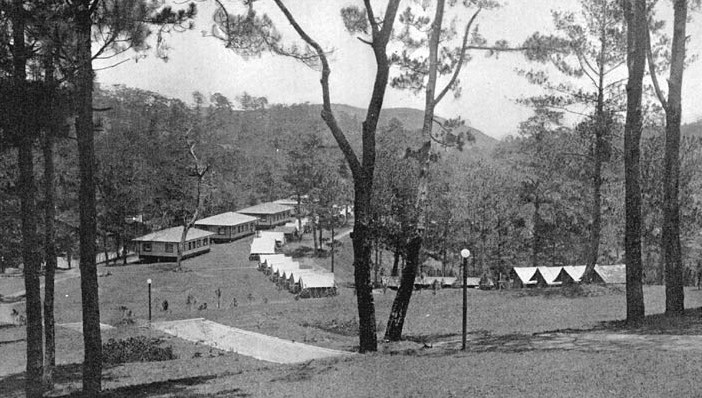
Teachers Camp in 1909

=== American period ===
The Teachers Camp was established on December 11, 1907, by an ordinance by Benguet Governor William Pack in an area which was then named O-ring-ao to accommodate both American and Filipino teachers. The outline of the camp's plan was made by W. Morgan Schuster, secretary of the Bureau of Public Instruction on January 18, 1908. The camp opened as a training center and vacation site for teachers and employees of the Insular government a few months later on April 6, 1908. The first Teachers Vacation Assembly started on the same date and ran until May 30, 1908. During its early years, tents were used for the camp's classrooms, kitchen, dining and storage facilities.

In 1911, the first building was built in Teachers Camp. Access roads and pathways were made. In 1912, cottages were set up for the camp director, secretary and undersecretary of education. More funds were allocated for Teachers Camp's development which led to the Benitez Hall, Ladies Hall, Teacher's Hall, Tavera Hall, and the White Hall being built.

The Philippine Military Academy (PMA) previously occupied a large area of Teachers Camp. The PMA temporarily moved out of Camp Henry Allen to Teachers Camp in 1936 due to a projected increase in the number of members of the Cadet Corps. During the PMA occupancy the General Luna Hall was built. The PMA stayed in Teachers Camp from June 15, 1936, until December 12, 1941, when World War II broke out.

=== World War II ===
During the Japanese occupation of the Philippines from 1942 to 1945, the occupying forces used the camp as their hospital. It was left damaged after the war.

=== Contemporary history ===
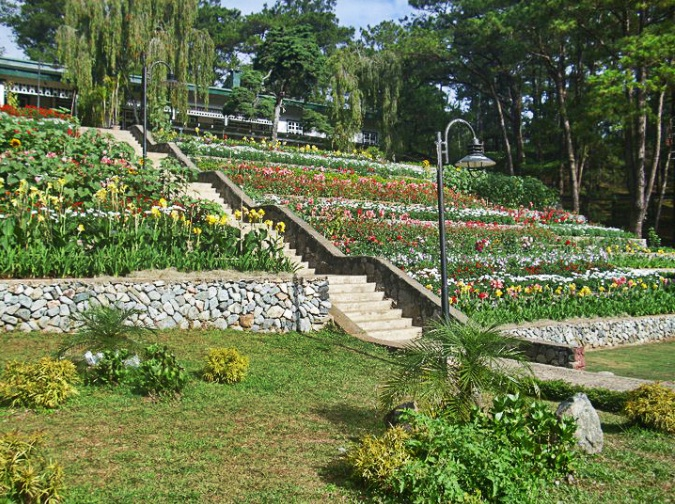
Garden at Teachers Camp

The Teachers Camp was repaired and reopened in 1947, shortly after the end of World War II. The PMA also moved backed to Camp Allen within the same year prior to transferring to Fort Gregorio del Pilar in 1950. On January 1, 1971, the Pangasinan Police Academy (now the Cordillera Administrative Region Training Center) moved in to Teachers Camp.

President Corazon Aquino through Proclamation No. 290 defined areas in Baguio which would constitute the Teachers Camp Reservation on July 18, 1988. The reservation was placed under the administration of the Department of Education, Culture and Sports (DECS; now the Department of Education).

The first Philippine Sports Summit was held in the early 1990s during the presidency of Fidel V. Ramos where the Magna Carta for Philippine Sports was made as an effort to boost the national sports program. Such efforts failed when the original Magna Carta was not referred to in the succeeding summits.

The Baguio City Council passed a resolution recognizing the Teachers Camp as a heritage site. In 2008, renovations were made on the Teachers Camp's seminar halls and cottages which were completed as part of the facility's centenary. The national government followed suit, and declared Teachers Camp as a national heritage site in the same year.

== Usage ==
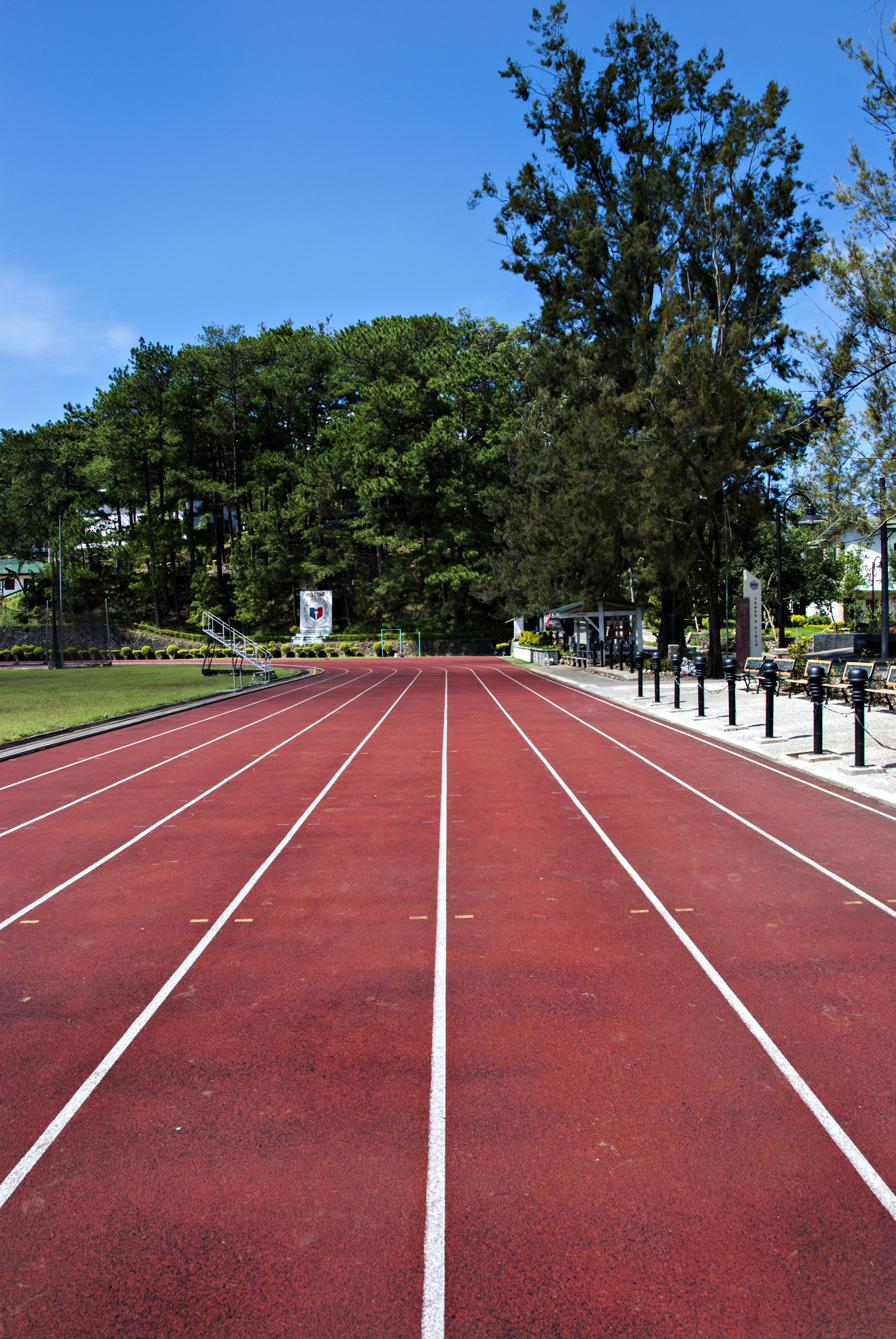
Athletic track in Teachers Camp

Teachers Camp is managed by a director, and is directly under the Department of Education (DepEd) Teachers Camp is the site of the National Educators Academy of the Philippines (NEAP), which is DepEd's training arm. Teachers from different parts of the Philippines enroll in education special courses during the summer break. The center hosts classrooms, dormitories, cottages, dining areas, assembly halls and administrative offices. When teachers are not using the facility, the dormitories and cottages are rented to tourists. It also hosts events sponsored by government agencies.

The area was also the former site of the Mountain Province High School (MP High, now known as the Baguio City National High School) The Philippine Public Safety College also runs the Cordillera Administrative Region Training Center (CARTC) which is within the Teachers Camp. The CARTC is the training center for members of the Philippine National Police of the Cordillera Administrative Region.

The Philippine Sports Commission (PSC) also maintains their own facilities within the Teachers Camp, including an athletic oval. From 1976 to 1989, track and field athletes under the government initiated, Gintong Alay sports program trained at Teachers Camp.

== Heritage status ==
National Historical Institute marker

On May 12, 2008, Teachers Camp was declared as national heritage site. The facility is a marked structure according to a 2015 report.

Believers of the paranormal say the camp is haunted because it is more than 100 years old.
