= Wright Park (Baguio) =

Park in Baguio, Philippines

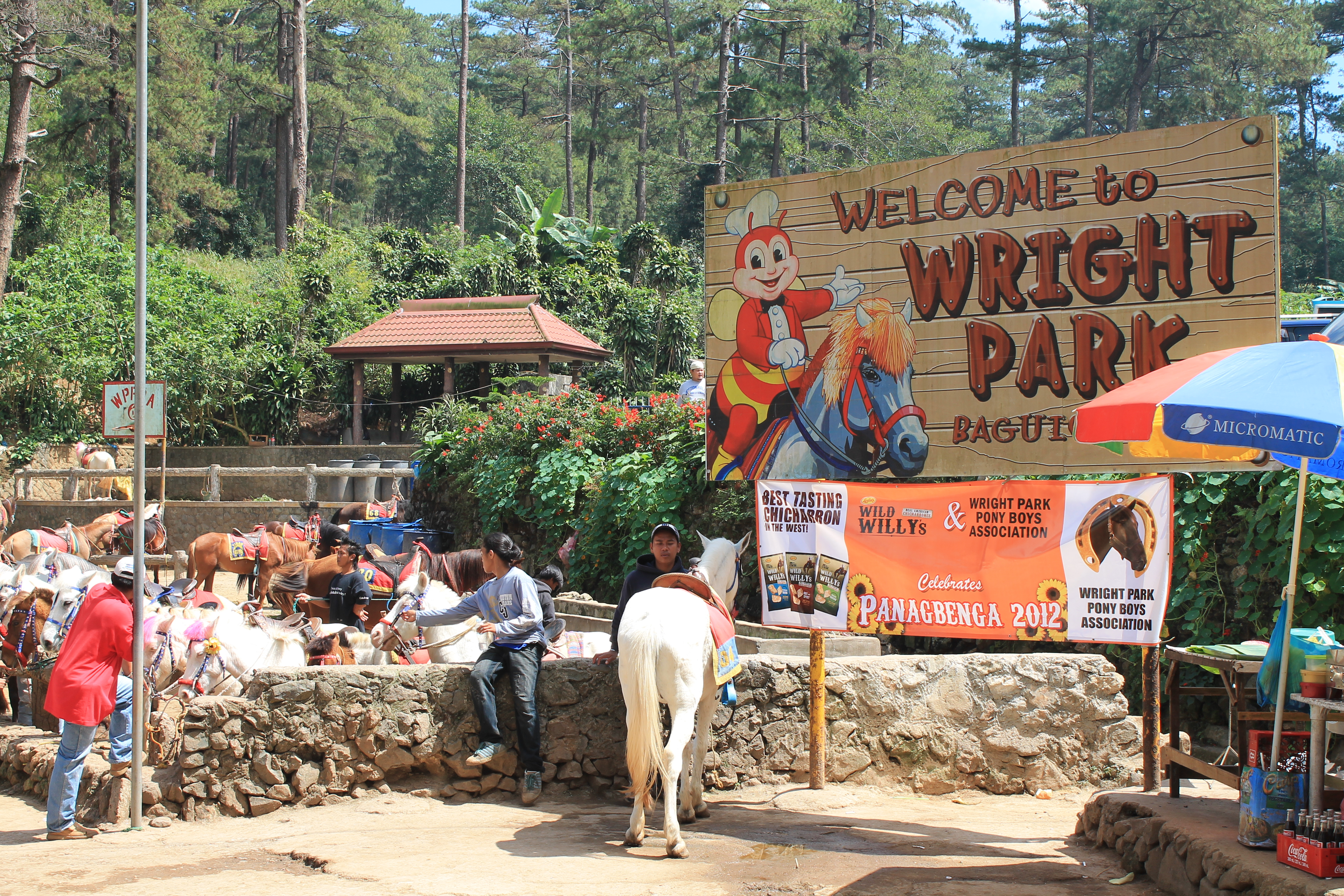
- Wright Park
- Interactive map of Wright Park
- Location: Lualhati, Baguio, Benguet, Philippines
- Coordinates: 16°24′55″N 120°37′07″E
- Open: All year

Wright Park is a park in Baguio, Philippines.

== Background ==
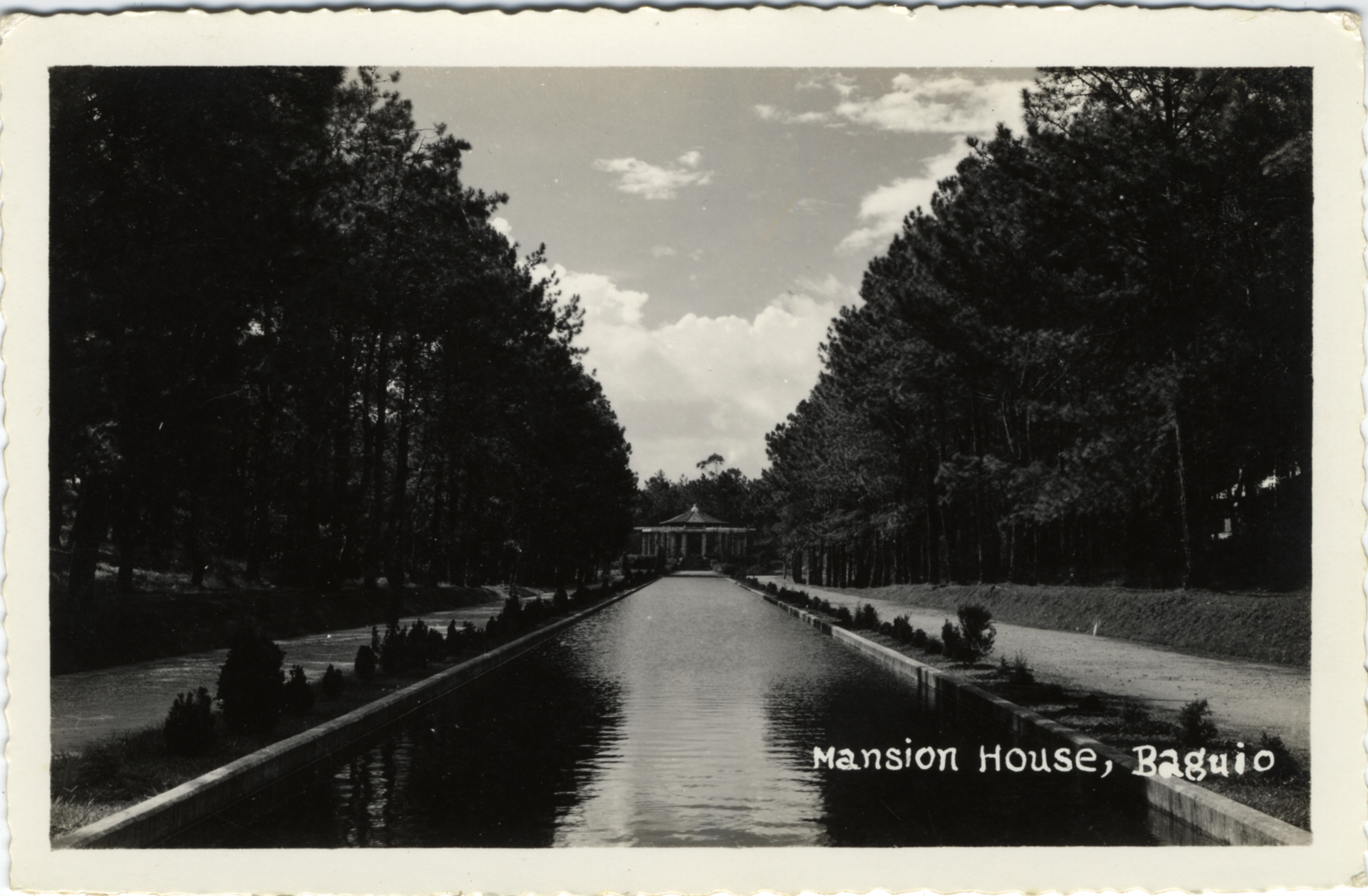
The park fronting the Mansion House, circa 1935

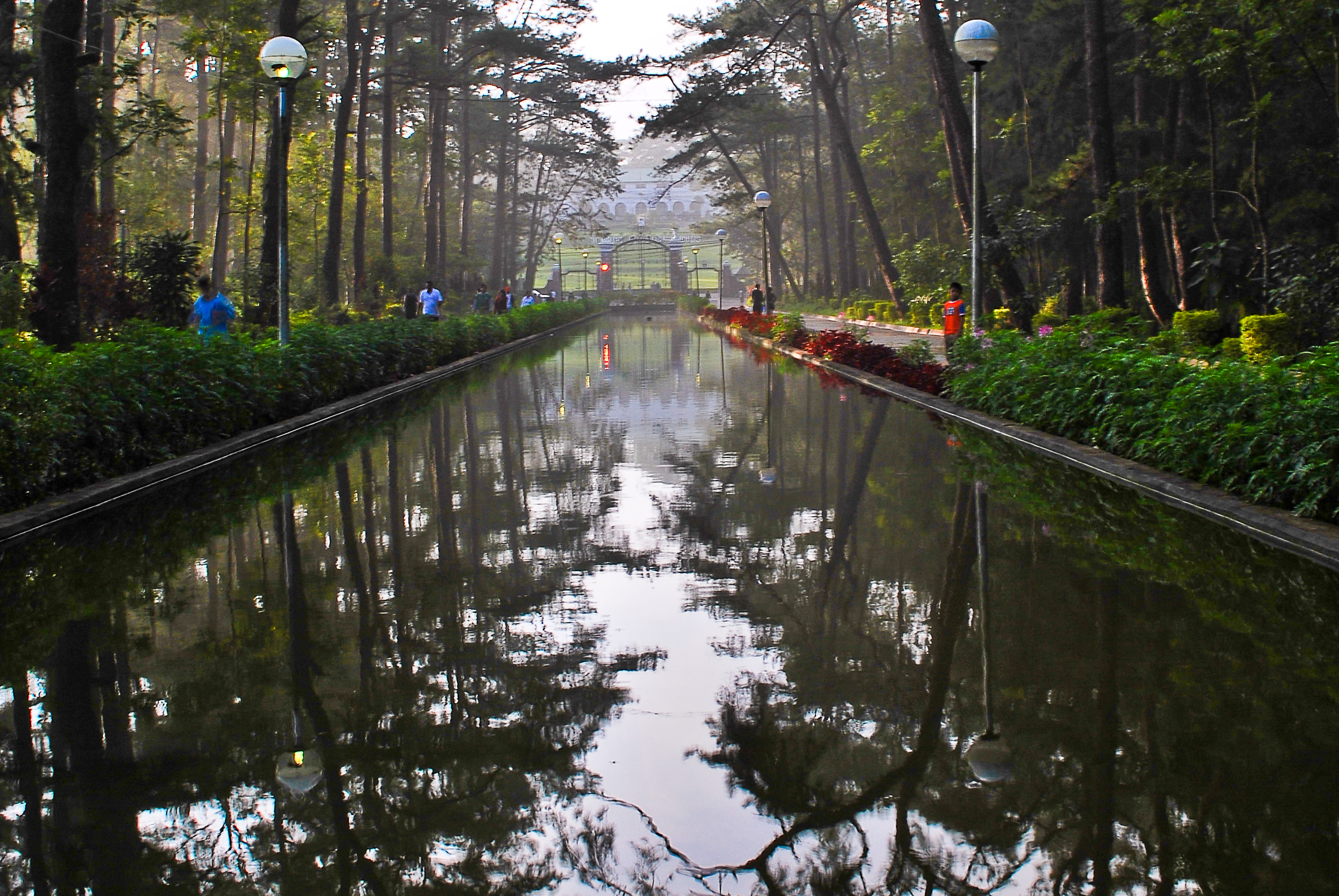
Pond at the park, 2009

Wright Park is a wooded area in Baguio which became known for its horseback riding services for tourists. It was named after American Governor Luke E. Wright and was established as a recreational area. It is situated near The Mansion. The horses are owned and handled by "pony boys", who are often a member of the Ibaloi community.

The park was closed down in early 2020 due to the COVID-19 pandemic, but has since reopened to local tourists in July 2020. In the same year, an outbreak of equine infectious anemia broke out affecting the health of horses in Wright Park.

In September 2020, the Baguio city government unveiled a ₱717 million development plan which it conceived prior to the pandemic.
