= Baguio City National High School =

Public high school in Baguio, Philippines

Location
- Gov. Pack Road, Baguio; Philippines
- 16°24′25″N 120°35′50″E

Information
- Type: Public
- Established: 1916
- Principal: Whitney A. Dawayen
- Staff: 339
- Grades: 7 to 12
- Enrollment: 6,607 (2014, Main Campus)
- Website: baguiocityhigh.wordpress.com

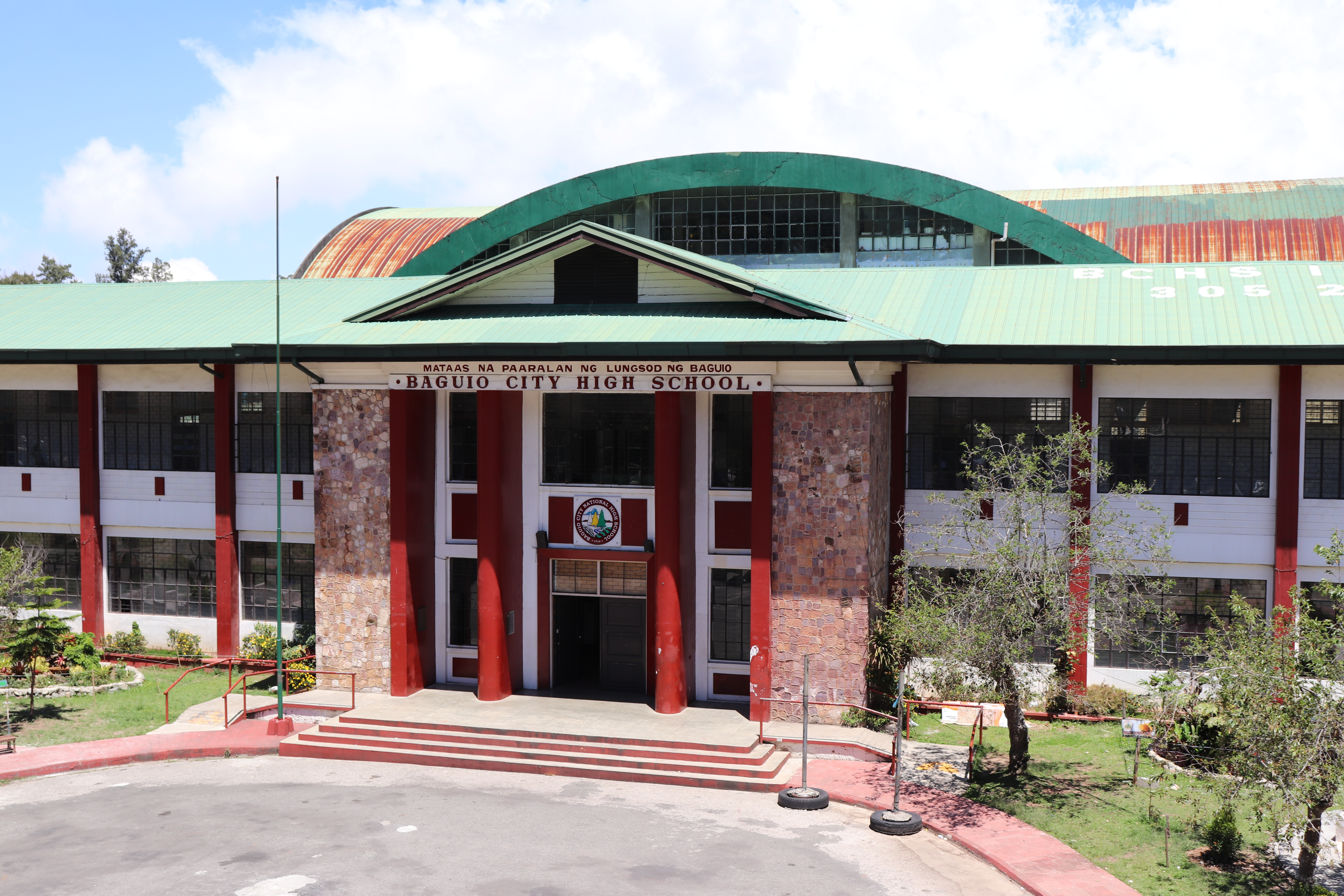
School facade

The first secondary school in Baguio, Philippines was the normal school in 1916 later called Baguio Trade School. Classes were held where Home Sweet Home now stands as this area and the present University of the Philippines Baguio location was included in the reserved land for the Bureau of Education by Forbes. In 1919 it became Mountain Province High School. Classes were held at Teacher’s Camp and native girls from all over the province were housed at Bua Dormitory known today as Pacdal Elementary School. Among the pioneer teachers were Juan Balagot, Servillano Tumaneng, Pedro Balagot, Genoveva Llamas, Esperanza Ver, Donato Guerzon, Julia Guerzon, Grace H. Miller, Petra Ramirez, and Pilar Tan and Jess L. Gains who was also the principal.

MPHS easily gained national popularity in both academics and athletics because for a number of years, it had the strongest baseball team in Northern Luzon. Its coach, Arthur McCann produced baseball champs such as pitcher Antonio Capulo who one time pitched a non score game to Northern Luzon Teams and Juan Cerantes who was rated best 2nd baseman in the country. Antonio Dimas, Eugene Pucay, Gilbert Sonduan, Dibson Diwas, Braulio Caoili and Chakchakan Colis became legends in their time. The girls were famous for their extensive lace making and native weaving projects that easily became popular among tourists. The graduates added to the institution’s prestige for they had high proficiency in both spoken and written English.

Succeeding principals who served MPHS were Mr. Richard B. Patterson, Ms. Eldridge, and Mr. Paul Bramlett.

The normal curriculum was transferred to the Trinidad Agricultural High School; thus, it became the responsibility of the Mountain Province.

In 1937, the national government transferred the financial responsibility of maintaining the school to the city government; thus, the name Mountain Province High School was replaced with Baguio City High School. BCHS squatted at the present site of Baguio Government Center until World War II broke out in 1941. During the Japanese occupation, classes were held at Quezon Elementary School. By 1945, the school admitted students at the Vallejo Hotel, then moved back to Teacher’s Camp during the second semester.

The destruction of the Government Center buildings during the liberation started the school’s troubles about where to hold classes without having to move property and equipment. Several mayors worked for a permanent site of BCHS building. In 1947, Mayor Jose M. Cariño was eyeing the former residence of Governor Blanco. It didn’t push through however because of the plan to put up a national stadium and swimming pool at the Athletic Bowl site. Finally, Mayor Luis Torres succeeded in establishing the fact that former Governor Blanco’s place was the property of the government. Mayor Gil R. Mallare made every effort that led to the approval of the site as a permanent house of BCHS. He also secured an amount of Php180, 000.00 loan from the Rehabilitation Financing Corporation to start the construction of the building on September 20, 1953.

Mr. Gregorio R. Ariz, the principal, and the Parents Teachers Association (PTA) headed by Rufino S. Bueno who served as president from 1948-1958, continued to ask for a permanent site of BCHS. The present site of the high school was segregated from the Burnham Park Reservation in June 1953 under Proclamation No. 401 that awarded BCHS 11,840 square meters of land. Construction began under the administration of Mayor Benito H. Lopez and was finished during the term of Mayor Alfonso Tabora, with an additional expense of 40,000.00 to finish the right wing of the main building. Inauguration rites were held on October 24, 1954.

Hall renovations were made over the years in the main building to accommodate the ever increasing population. In 1964, a Home Economics building was constructed, followed by a Vocational Building. Prefabricated units were put up in 1978-1981. Other buildings were erected like the Economics Support Fund (ESF) building which was constructed in 1985 under the financial support of the USAID, Science Laboratory 1 and 2, the 6-room Sony Building, the two-storey DPWH building, the three-storey Flavier I building with 12 rooms, Flavier II with 16 rooms, the Home Economics building, the Multipurpose Building with 20 classrooms and the six-room SEDP building.

Currently, the school has an auditorium, a gymnasium, and an audio-visual room. The school also utilizes the adjacent Athletic Bowl. It has canteens and home economics stores. All subject areas have a learning center and the school has eight computer laboratories.

Other Curricula

In 1972, the science section opened as a special program but it was discontinued after two years due to the implementation of the revised secondary curriculum. It was reopened in 1984 through the efforts of class’ 58 alumni, the City Council and the school administration. This was accomplished through the strong support and continuous follow-up of the then Councilor Bert Floresca as member of the committee on Education and that time the president of the Alumni Association.

In 1995, two buildings were constructed by the Department of Public Works and Highways (DPWH) and DOST-SEI laboratory building, which then served as the permanent home of the Special Science Classes. Currently, the school no longer offers the science program due to the establishment of the Baguio City National Science High School in Irisan.

Subsequently in 2000, the Special Program in the Arts and the Special Program for Sports were instituted to maximize the development of students who have artistic and athletic potentials.

In 2017, the school offered Special Program in Journalism to hone the journalistic skills and competencies of student-writers and to strengthen free and responsible journalism.

In 2022, Special Program in Foreign Language was offered to prepare students for higher education and employment with competence in Chinese Mandarin.

School Heads

Mrs. Beula Head (1936)

Mr. Pablo Reyes (1937-1938)

Mr. Anselmo Patacsil (1938-1939)

Mr. Antonio Alba (1939-1940)

Mr. Bernardino Rebaya (1940-1948)

Mr. Gregorio Ariz Sr. (1949-1969)

Dr. Florencio Buen (1969-1974)

Ms. Dolores Valdez(1974-1976)

Mrs. Feleciana Penera (1976-1979)

Mrs. Josefina Sarmenta (1979-1982)

Dr. Lolita Florendo (1982-1991)

Dr. Philip Flores (1991-February 1997)

Mrs. Priscilla Bautista (February–September 1997)

Dr. Elma D. Donaal (October 1997-July 2015)

Mr. Romulo M. Flora (July 2015-October 2017)

Mrs. Brenda M. Cariño (January 2018- 2022)

Mr. Whitney A. Dawayen (January 2023 – present)

Annexes

Student population in the 1960s escalated tremendously that by the end of the decade, students can no longer be properly accommodated by the school. Annex high schools for first and second year students had to be opened in some elementary schools.

In 1968, annex schools were opened at Baguio Central School, Doña Aurora, Loakan, Bonifacio and Rizal Elementary Schools. Other annexes were later opened that included Quirino, Irisan, Santo Tomas, Quezon Hill, San Vicente, Bakakeng, Fort del Pilar, and Hillside. With the increase of the number of students in the main campus and the annexes, the annex located in Baguio Central School had to be separated as another city-funded high school carrying the new name Pines City High School in 1980 with Mr. Leandro Flora as its principal. Eventually, all annexes have been separated and are now nationalized high schools.

Successful Alumni

Among the Alumni who reached notable positions are:

Armed Forces:

Gen. Simeon Ver (’41), Gen. Samuel Sarmeinto (’41), Gen. Ernesto Bueno (’44), Gen. Florendo Aquino (’47), and Gen. Jose Balajadia (’59) to name a few. Gen. Bueno also became the mayor of Baguio.

Department Secretary: Health-Dr. Juan Flavier (’52), Finance-Atty. Edgardo Espiritu (’52), Foreign Affairs-Delia Domingo Albert(’58), Minister of Energy-Arthur Sali and DENR Secretary (for Planning and Policies)-Sabado Batcagan. Espiritu and Albert have also been appointed as ambassadors to the United Kingdom, and Germany and Australia respectively.

National/Regional Executive Directors: Dr. Juan Flavier ('52) president of the Philippine Rural Reconstruction Movement, president of the International Institute of Rural Reconstruction, Atty. Sinai C. Hamada ('30), Chairman-Mountain Province Development Authority, Arthur Figueras (’53)-NBI, Oscar Hamada (’58)-DENR, Peter Cosalan (’59) and Sean Dacanay Sr. (’72)- NEDA, Isabelo Cosalan (’54)-Telecommunications and again Sabado Batcagan for the DENR.

Politics: Senator Juan Flavier ('52), Congressmen Atty. Samuel Dangwa (’55) and Atty. Rene Pilando (’66), Governors Ben Palispis (’34) and Dr. Andres Bugnosen (’49) of Benguet, Tiburcio Edano Jr. (’50) of Zambales, Mayors Gen. Bueno, Virginia de Guia (’32) and Col. Francisco Paraan (’34) of Baguio, Councilors Jose Buendo (’41), Atty. Ricardo Paraan (’44), Atty Bert Fenesca (’48), Gerry Evangelista (’48), Atty. Leandro Carino (’49) and Atty. Daniel Farina (’72).

Judiciary: judges Andrew Belit Jr. (’50), Edilberto Claravall (’63), Evangelista Cortes Cuilan (’65), Maribelle Demot-Marinas (’78), and Maria Teresa Guadana-Tano (’82).

Education: Deans Gabino Goroy (’53)-Commerce, St. Louis University; Eufracio de los Reyes (’57)-Commerce, SLU; Cesar Oracio (’63)-Law, SLU; Sonia Dao-as-Education, Baguio Colleges Foundation/UC and Daniel Fariñas (’72)-Law, UB. We also have Division Superintendents in the person of Dr. Pat Boquiren (’47) and Damaso Bangaoet Sr. (’29).

Other Alumni greats are: Atty. Sinai C. Hamada ('30), 1st editor-in-chief of the Baguio Midland Courier, short story writer and lyricist of the Baguio City National High School hymn, Cecile Afable, editor-in-chief of Baguio Midland Courier, Leonora San Agustin, curator of Baguio Mountain Province Museum, and Atty. Zoraida Andam (’93) who was crowned Ms. Philippines in 2001.
