= Baguio City Hall =

Government building in Baguio, Philippines

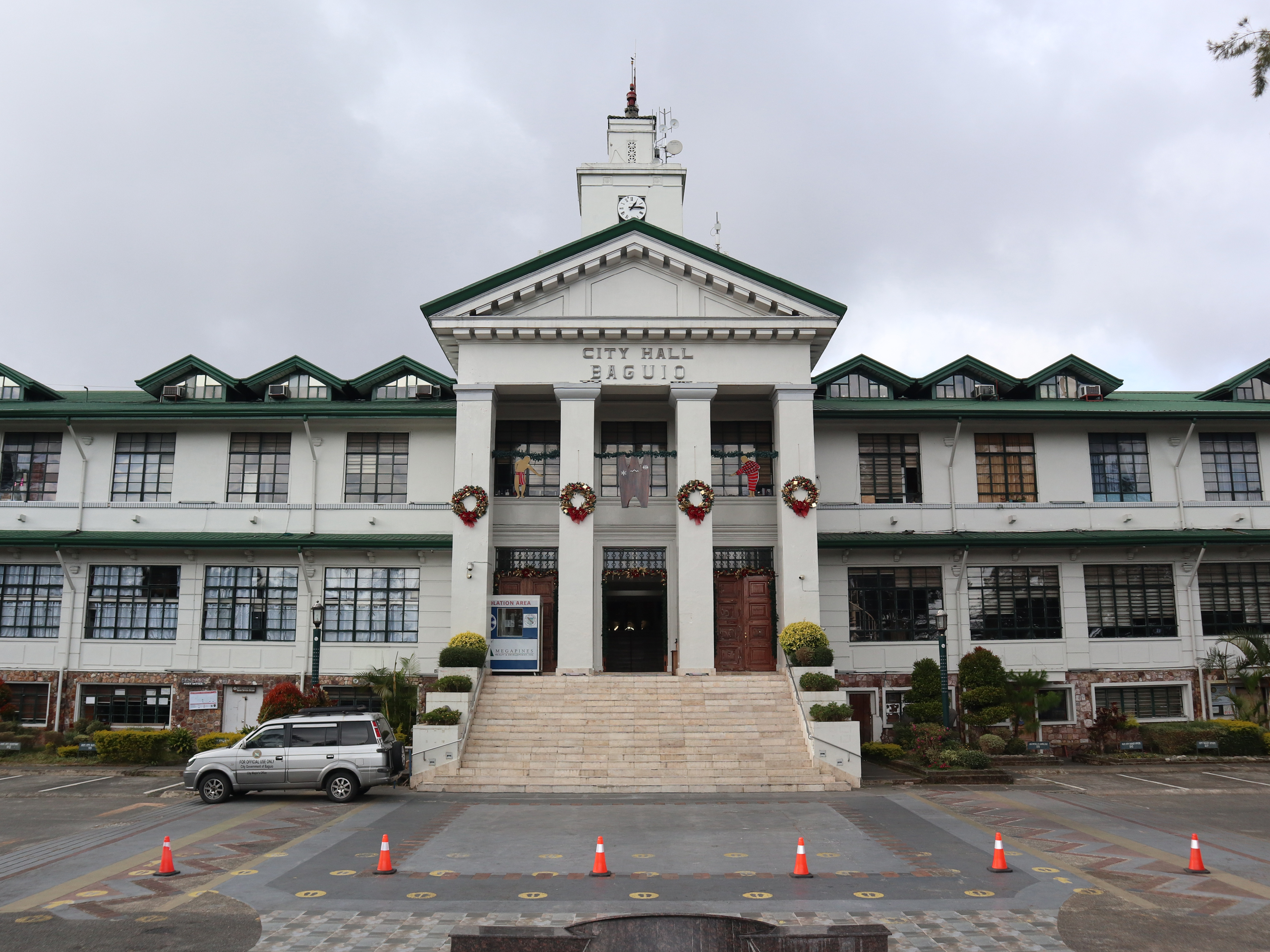
- The city hall in 2022
- Interactive map of the Baguio City Hall area

General information
- Type: City government building
- Coordinates: 16.4138°N 120.5914°E
- Opened: 1910

The Baguio City Hall is the official government seat of government for Baguio, Philippines. It holds the office of the Mayor of Baguio. The building was constructed from wood during the first mayor of Baguio EW Reynolds in 1910. It was destroyed during the Second World War and was reconstructed with concrete. It was renovated in the 1990s.

The City Hall's complex holds an amphitheater and a city park.

== History ==
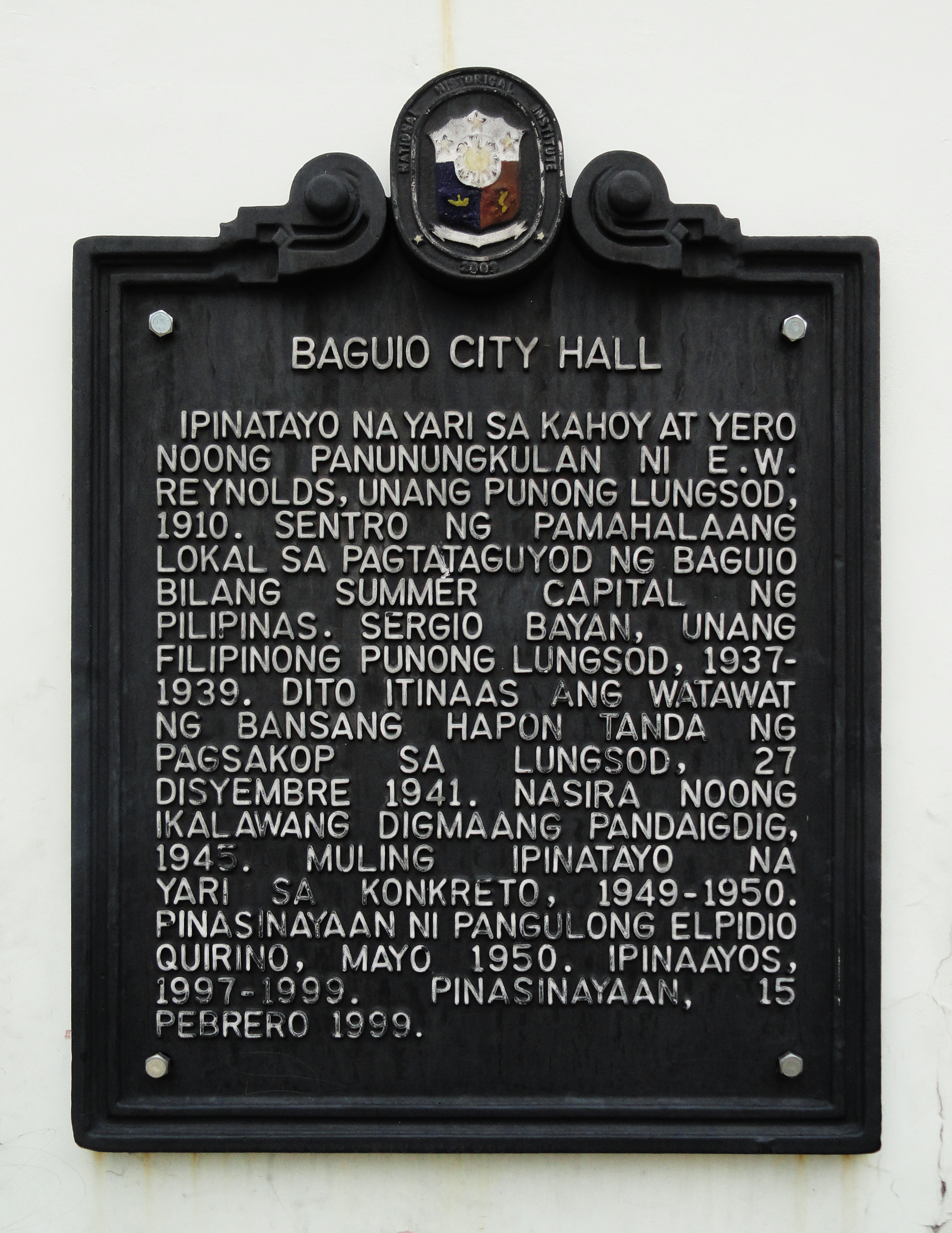
Historical marker

Dean C. Worcester led the first Philippine Commission to Kafagway in 1900, the Ibaloi name for the area now occupied by City Hall. The earliest version of the City Hall was a wooden structure built in 1910. It was rebuilt after World War II and was renovated in the late 1990s.

An improvised C-4 exploded in a bathroom of the building on December 6, 2006.

The City Hall was declared a historical site. A historical marker was installed in February 2009. Plans for building a fence on the City Hall started in 2008 but was implemented in 2015 after completion of the bid and award process. The plan included the construction of a museum and an extended platform that would serve as a viewing deck and stage in the flagpole area. The Baguio Heritage Foundation objected to the project as it would disturb the original design of the building. Excavation work was observed in April 2015.

The National Commission for Culture and the Arts (NCCA) sent a cease-and-desist order on June 3, 2015, to the local government to stop the improvement project on the city hall. The NCCA argued that the City Hall is a Grade III Protected Building and is protected from modification or demolition per RA 10066. However, the National Historical Commission of the Philippines (NHCP) sent the city government a letter approving the fence construction after inspections. The letter argued that the fence, made of see-through grilles, will secure the building from vandals. Modifications in the flagpole area would also not "obstruct the dominance and prominence" of the City Hall. The fence was eventually built and is past the 5-meter (16 ft) buffer zone.

A marker was installed by the NHCP in 2018. The City Hall received its land title on September 24, 2020. The building remained a public lot throughout before obtaining a land title. Various proposals aimed to convert several rooms the building into a museum or an art gallery.

== Architecture ==
The hall holds an open-air 655-square-meter (7,050 sq ft) City Hall Park that holds stone statues and an amphitheater. The park also holds landscaped flowers and trees. In 2010, ₱3 million was spent for a lighting system around the City Hall's facade. The local government announced in 2026 for a two-story ₱60 million parking lot building.

The public library used to be in the City Hall from 1993 to 1998. Books were moved to the City Hall after the 1990 Luzon earthquake.
