= List of Korean-language poets =

This is a list of Korean-language poets.

== Twentieth-century poets ==
=== Alphabetical list ===
A

- An Heon-mi (born 1972)

==== B ====
- Baek Seok (1912–1996)
- Bok Koh-il (born 1946)

==== C ====
- Chae Ho-ki (born 1957)
- Cheon Sang-byeong (1930–1993)
- Cheon Yang-hee (born 1942)
- Cheong Chi-yong (1902–1950)
- Cho Byung-hwa (1921–2003)
- Cho Chi-hun (1920–1968)
- Cho Chung-kwon (born 1949)
- Cho Mina (born 1960)
- Cho Yongmee (born 1962)
- Ch'oe Hae (1901–1932)
- Choi Jeong-rye (1955–2021)
- Choi Nam-son (1890–1957)
- Choi Seung-ho (born 1954)
- Choi Young-mi (born 1961)
- Chu Yo-han (1900–1979)

==== D ====
- Do Jong-hwan (born 1954)

==== E ====
- Eom Won-tae (born 1955)

==== G ====
- Gi Hyeong-do (1960–1989)
- Go Hyeong-ryeol (born 1954)

==== H ====
- Ha Seung-moo (born 1963)
- Han Yong-un (1879–1944)
- Heo Su-gyeong (born 1964)
- Heo Yeon (born 1966)
- Hong Shin-seon (born 1944)
- Hong Yun-suk (born 1925)
- Hwang In-suk (born 1958)
- Hwang Tong-gyu (born 1938)
- Hwang Ji-U (born 1952)

==== J ====
- Jang Cheol-mun (born 1966)
- Jang Jeong-il (born 1962)
- Jang Seok Nam (1965)
- Jeong Ho-seung (born 1950)
- Jeong Ji-yong often romanized in literature as Cheong Chi-yong (정지용) (1902–1950)
- Jo Ki-chon (1913–1951)
- Jon Kyongnin (born 1962)

==== K ====
- Kang Eun-gyo (born 1945)
- Kim Chunsu (1922–2004)
- Kim Eon (born 1973)
- Kim Gi-taek (born 1957)
- Kim Gu-yong (Kim Kku; 1922–2001)
- Kim Haengsook (born 1970)
- Kim Hu-ran (born 1934)
- Kim Hyesoon (born 1955)
- Kim Jeong-hwan (born 1954)
- Kim Jong-chul (born 1947)
- Kim Jonghae (born 1941)
- Kim Jong-gil (born 1926)
- Kim Kyungrin (1918–2006)
- Kim Kwang-kyu (born 1941)
- Kim Kwang-lim (born 1929)
- Kim Kirim (1908-?)
- Kim Kyung-ju (born 1976)
- Kim Min Jeong (born 1976)
- Kim Myeong-in (born 1946)
- Kim Myeong-sun (1896–1951)
- Kim Nam-jo (born 1927)
- Kim Nyeon-gyun (born 1942)
- Kim Sa-in (born 1956)
- Kim Sang-ok (1920–2004)
- Kim Sinyong (born 1945)
- Kim Seon-wu (born 1970)
- Kim Seung-hee (born 1952)
- Kim Soo-young (1921–1968)
- Kim Sowol (1902–1934)
- Kim Su-yeong (1921–1968)
- Kim Yeong-hyeon (born 1955)
- Kim Young-moo (1944–2001)
- Kim Youngtae (1936–2007)
- Kim Yeong-nang (1903–1950)
- Kwak Jae-gu (born 1954)
- Ko Chang-soo (born 1934)
- Ko Un (born 1933)
- Ko Hyeong-ryeol (born 1954)
- Ku Sang (1919–2004)

==== L ====
- Lee Hae-in (born 1945)
- Lee Hyeonggi (1933–2005)
- Lee Hye-gyeong (1960–2026)
- Lee Jangwook (born 1968)
- Lee Jenny (born 1972)
- Lee Seong-bok (born 1952)
- Lee SungBoo (1942–2012)
- Lee Yuksa (1904–1944)
- Lee Yuntaek (born 1952)
- Lee Ze-ha (born 1937)

==== M ====
- Ma Jonggi (born 1939)
- Moon Chung-hee (born 1947)
- Moh Yoon-sook (1910–1990)
- Moon Deoksu (born 1928)
- Moon Taejun (born 1970)

==== N ====
- Noh Cheonmyeong (1912–1957)

==== O ====
- Oh Kyu Won (1947–2007)
- Oh Sae-Young (born 1942)
- Oh Takbeon (born 1943)

==== P ====
- Pak Tu-jin (1916–1998)
- Park Hee-Jin (1931–2015)
- Park In-hwan (1926–1956)
- Park Jaesam (1933–1997)
- Park Jeong-dae (born 1965)
- Park Nam-su (1918–1994)
- Park Mok-wol (1916–1978)
- Ynhui Park (born 1930)
- Park Yong-rae (1925–1980)
- Park Young-geun (1958–2006)

==== R ====
- Ra Hee-Duk (born 1966)

==== S ====
- Seo Jeong-ju ("Midang") (1915–2000)
- Seung-Moo Ha (born 1964)
- Shin Kyeong-nim (born 1936)
- Shin Yong-Mok (born 1974)
- Sung Chan-gyeong (1930–2013)

==== W ====
- Wonhyo (617–686)

==== Y ====
- Yi Geun-hwa (born 1976)
- Yi Ho-woo (1912–1970)
- Yi Sang (1910–1937)
- Yi Sang-hwa (1901–1943)
- Yoo Yeong (1917–2002)
- Emily Jungmin Yoon born in Busan; living in the U.S.
- Yu Anjin (born 1941)
- Yu Chi-hwan (1908–1967)
- Yun Dong-ju (1917–1945)

=== Chronological list ===
==== uncertain birthdate ====
- Emily Jungmin Yoon, active 2017 on

==== 1970s ====
- Yi Geun-hwa (born 1976)
- Kim Min Jeong (born 1976)
- Kim Kyung-ju (born 1976)
- Shin Yong-Mok (born 1974)
- Kim Eon (born 1973)
- Kim Seon-wu (born 1970)
- Moon Taejun (born 1970)
- Han Kang (born 1970)

==== 1960s ====
- Lee Jangwook (born 1968)
- Ra Hee-Duk (born 1966)
- Jang Cheol-mun (born 1966)
- Park Jeong-dae (born 1965)
- Jang Seok Nam (born 1965)
- Seung-Moo Ha (born 1964)
- Heo Su-gyeong (born 1964)
- Ha Seung-moo (born 1963)
- Jang Jeong-il (born 1962)
- Jon Kyongnin (born 1962)
- Choi Young-mi (born 1961)
- Gi Hyeong-do (1960–1989)
- Lee Hye-gyeong (born 1960)

==== 1950s ====
- Hwang In-suk (1958)
- Park Young-geun (1958–2006)
- Kim Gi-taek (born 1957)
- Chae Ho-ki (born 1957)
- Kim Sa-in (born 1956)
- Kim Yeong-hyeon (born 1955)
- Choi Jeong-rye (born 1955)
- Do Jong-hwan (born 1954)
- Kim Jeong-hwan (born 1954)
- Kwak Jae-gu (born 1954)
- Go Hyeong-ryeol (born 1954)
- Lee Seong-bok (born 1952)
- Hwang Ji-U (born 1952)
- Kim Seung-hee (born 1952)
- Lee Yuntaek (born 1952)
- Jeong Ho-seung (born 1950)

==== 1940s ====
- Cho Chung-kwon (born 1949)
- Park Hee-Jin (born 1947)
- Kim Jong-chul (born 1947)
- Moon Chung-hee (born 1947)
- Oh Kyu Won (born 1947)
- Bok Koh-il (born 1946)
- Kim Myeong-in (born 1946)
- Kim Sinyong (born 1945)
- Kang Eun-gyo (born 1945)
- Cheon Sang-byeong (born 1945)
- Kim Young-moo (1944–2001)
- Oh Takbeon (born 1943)
- Lee Garim (born 1943)
- Lee SungBoo (1942–2012)
- Choi Seung-ho (born 1942)
- Cheon Yang-hee (born 1942)
- Yu Anjin (born 1941)
- Kim Jonghae (born 1941)
- Kim Kwang-kyu (born 1941)

==== 1930s ====
- Hwang Tong-gyu (born 1938)
- Lee Ze-ha (born 1937)
- Shin Kyeong-nim (born 1936)
- Kim Hu-ran (born 1934)
- Ko Chang Soo (born 1934)
- Park Jaesam (born 1933)
- Ko Un (born 1933)
- Lee Hyeonggi (born 1933)
- Cheon Sang-byeong (1930–1993)
- Sung Chan-gyeong (1930–2013)
- Ynhui Park (born 1930)

==== 1920s ====
- Kim Kwang-lim (born 1929)
- Moon Deoksu (1928–2020)
- Kim Nam-Jo (born 1927)
- Park In-hwan (1926–1956)
- Kim Jong-Gil (1926–1956)
- Hong Yun-suk (1925–2015)
- Park Yong-rae (1925–1980)
- Kim Ch'un-su (1922–2004)
- Kim Kyu-yong (Kim Kku) (1922–2001)
- Kim Su-yŏng (1921–1968)
- Kim Sang-ok (1920–2004)
- Cho Chi-hun (1920–1968)

==== 1910s ====
- Ku Sang (1919–2004)
- Park Nam-su (1919–1994)
- Kim Kyungrin (1918–2006)
- Yoo Yeong (1917–2002)
- Yun Dong-ju (1917–1945)
- Park Mok-wol (1916–1978)
- Sŏ Chŏng-ju (1915–2000)
- Baek Seok(1912–1996)
- Yi Ho-woo (1912–1970)
- Noh Cheonmyeong (1912–1957)
- Yi Sang (1910–1937)

==== 1900s ====
- Kim Kirim (1908-?)
- Yu Chi-hwan (1908–1967)
- Lee Yuksa (1904–1944)
- Kim Yŏng-nang (1903–1950)
- Jeong Ji-yong, often romanized in literature as Cheong Chi-yong (정지용) (1902–1950)
- Kim Sowol (1902–1934)
- Yi Sang-hwa (1901–1943)
- Chu Yo-han (1900–1979)

==== 1890s ====
- Kim Myeong-sun (1896–1951)
- Kim Ok (1896-unknown)
- Choi Nam-son (1890–1957)

== Nineteenth-century poets ==
- Han Yong-un [Manhae] (1879–1944)

== Seventeenth-century poets ==
- Yun Sŏndo (1587–1671)
- Heo Nanseolheon (1563–1589)

== Earlier poets ==
Note: Some or all of these poets, though Korean, wrote in Chinese.

- Heo Nanseolheon (1563-1589)
- Seokcheon, art name of Kim Gak (1536-1610)
- Chŏng Ch'ŏl (1536–1594)
- Hwang Jin-i (1522-1565)
- Song Tŏkpong (1521-1578)
- Yi Saek (1328-1395 [1396?])
- Ch'oe Ch'ung (984-1068)
- Kyun Yeo (917—973)
- Ch'oe Ch'iwŏn (857-915)
- Wonhyo (617–686)

== See also ==
- Korean poetry
