= Franklin Long =

Franklin Long may refer to:

- Franklin A. Long (1910–1999), American chemist
- Franklin B. Long (1842–1912), American architect in Minneapolis, Minnesota
