= KKU =

KKU or kku may refer to:

- Khon Kaen University, a university in Thailand
- King Khalid University, a public university in Abha, Saudi Arabia
- Kanakpura railway station (Indian Railway station code), a railway station in Rajasthan
- Kuapa Kokoo Farmers' Union, a 1993 Ghanaian cocoa farmers' cooperative organisation
- Kim Gu-yong (1922–2001), pen-name Kim Kku, a South Korean poet and calligrapher
- Ekuk Airport IATA FID, the IATA code for the airport in Ekuk, Alaska
- K. K. University, a university in Bihar, India
- Tumi language (ISO 639 code)
- Kula Kei Uluivuya, a Fijian music band
