= Kim Sang-ok =

Kim Sang-ok may refer to:

- Kim Sang-ok (poet)
- Kim Sang-ok (independence activist)
