= Eom Won-tae =

South Korean poet (born 1955)

Eom Bung-hun (born 1955), known by his pen name Eom Won-tae, is a South Korean poet. While fighting against chronic renal failure for 25 years, Eom continued to write poetry that delivers his warm introspection on life and death. His poetic world started from the gaze into his own existential pain and has steadily expanded into the affirmation of the other and insight into contemporary society.

== Life ==
Eom was born in Daegu during the early summer of 1955. He made a literary debut in 1978, but did not engage in literary activities in earnest until 1990, when he, under the pen name of Eom Won-tae, published "Namuneun wae jugeoseodo sseureojiji anneunga" (나무는 왜 죽어서도 쓰러지지 않는가 How Come Trees Do Not Fall Even after Death?) and four other poems. Eom has been writing poetry while maintaining his main career as a professor of landscape architecture. Perhaps for this reason, his poems frequently feature natural objects.

In 1987, Eom was diagnosed with chronic renal failure, which had been the greatest influence on his life and literary works. He had to visit the hospital three times a week for 25 years to receive renal dialysis.

== Writing ==
Early works

Eom's early poetic works are arid observations of objects that are going out of existence. In Chimyeopsurimeseo (1991), the poet repeatedly illustrates desolate natural environments, including a sunset field, a landscape where endlessly manufactured goods are abandoned and strewn around as debris, and the death of entities symbolized as a father and a young poet. Extinction, ruins, and poetic introspection on death discloses the myth of contemporary capitalism, and at the same time, serves as an allegory of our age that reveals the desolation of the future.

In Soeube daehan bogo (1995), "small town" is where all things rot and perish. The poet's eyes, which gaze at spaces filled only with boredom and loneliness, remain indifferent. Furthermore, the poetic self, who struggles with the agonizing pain of his sick body and the resulting discord with his mind, exists at the outer limit of his life. Even though the poetic self falls into a sense of life's meaninglessness, of despair, and of futility, he nevertheless objectively examines his fight against his illness by relying on the power of reason. In particular, what he has discovered from his illness is the irony of human desire. According to Eom's diagnosis, our contemporary society is addicted to consumption due to limitless desire, yet it has lost its purification capability, just like the poet who desires to relentlessly eat and drink but cannot discharge urine. He argues that what we need in such contemporary life is just to bear with it. He stresses that what's important is to endure and find beauty within boredom, just as the poetic self has found mental freedom as a way to overcome the vulnerability of his body.

Expansion of themes

The subject matter of Mulbangulmudeom (2007) is the real-life figures that have appeared in Korea's popular reality television show entitled Screening Humanity, where the everyday life of ordinary people are featured. The poet's language provides a dry observation and depiction of ordinary people's life stories. However, behind the façade of such arid documentation of ordinary everyday life lie his warm attitude toward other beings and his respect for the meaning of life. The poet's attention, which was once limited to his own sufferings, has opened up and discovered the Other that is confined by want and limitations. Thus, he has come to realize that we are all beings leading similar lives. Here, the poetic self recognizes that it is not just "I" who is suffering but everyone in the world. In this respect, the limitations of one's existence evolves into "melancholy affirmation" that allows for the affirmation and embracement of the lives of other existences.

In Meon urecheoreom dasi ol geosida (2013), the poet obtains dispassionate composure that recognizes even life's agony as a landscape. This is a point of peace that can be reached only after one has passed the critical point of pain and that can be seen only by those who have accepted life as a form of spiritual training. At this point, the dynamics that can be found only at the place of extinction create a new meaning of the circulation of life, instead of being reduced to melancholy. As described by the poet himself, his poetry is the records of and mourning for what have perished in vain. In this poetry collection, he gives condolences to the life of suffering that had been gruesome and begins to dream of a transition into a different life. It is at this point that Eom's poetry is recognized as "warm but strong in its linguistic power."

== Works ==
- 《침엽수림에서》, 민음사, 1991 / Chimyeopsurimeseo (From a Coniferous Forest), Minumsa, 1991
- 《소읍에 대한 보고》, 문학과 지성사, 1995 / Soeube daehan bogo (Report on a Small Town), Moonj, 1995
- 《물방울 무덤》, 창비, 2007 / Mulbangulmudeom (물방울무덤 Waterdrop Grave), Changbi, 2007
- 《먼 우레처럼 다시 올 것이다》, 창비, 2013 / Meon urecheoreom dasi ol geosida (It Will Return like Thunder from Afar), Changbi, 2013

== Awards ==
- Daegu Poets Association Award (대구시인협회상) (1991)
- Kim Dal-jin Literary Award (김달진문학상) (2007) for Mulbangulmudeom
- Geumbok Culture Award (금복문화상) (Literature Category) (2008)
- Balgyeon Literary Award (발견문학상) (2013) for Meon urecheoreom dasi ol geosida
- Baek Seok Prize for Literature (2013) for Meon urecheoreom dasi ol geosida

== See also ==
- List of Korean-language poets
- Korean poetry
