= Kwak Jae-gu =

South Korean modern poet (born 1954)

- Born: 1954 (age 71–72); Gwangju, Jeollanam-do
- Education: Chonnam National University

- Kwak Jae-gu
- Hangul: 곽재구
- Hanja: 郭在九
- RR: Gwak Jaegu
- MR: Kwak Chaegu

Kwak Jae-gu is a South Korean modern poet.

== Life ==
Kwak Jaegu was born in Gwangju, Jeollanam-do in 1954. He graduated from Chonnam National University. After his poem Sapyeongyeogeseo (At Sapyeong Station) won a literary contest sponsored by the JoongAng Ilbo in 1981, Kwak became active in the literary circle that produced the magazine May Poetry (Owol si). Kwak is currently a professor at Sunchon National University, where he works with Korean author Kim Won-il.

== Work ==
Kwak Jaegu’s poetic legacy derives primarily from the distinctly Korean aesthetic of his depictions of love and loneliness. The development evident from Kwak's first collection of poems, At Sapyeong Station (Sapyeongyeogeseo), to his third collection, Korean Lovers (Hangugui yeonindeul), demonstrates a transition from an abstract passion for historical and social issues to a relationship with social reality seen through the prism of unabstracted love. This poetic evolution can also be seen as an ever-deepening search for a true sense of self.

Beginning with his fourth collection of poems, Seoul Senoya, Kwak's poetry embarks upon a search for a concrete realization of love and spiritual rebirth. Kwak's early poetry overflows with anger at the egregious violence of society and a love for the common people who suffer from the brunt of this violence. The emotions at the fore in this poetry (sadness, loneliness, rage, despair, longing, love) demonstrate the extent of the poet's anger and frustration.

In Kwak's first collection of poems, these emotions are expressed in vague, abstract terms, they become progressively crystallized and concretely conveyed with each successive collection. The poems in Seoul Senoya reveal awareness of history and social conditions and a depiction of the human condition in concrete and lyrical. These poems transcend the basic emotions of anger and sorrow in light of the violence in the world and attempt to restore purity and love.

== Awards ==
- JoongAng Ilbo literary contest (1981)
- Dongseo Literature Prize (1997)

== Works in Korean (Partial) ==
Poetry

- At Sapyeong Station (Sapyeongyeogeseo), 1983
- Barrel-Loaded Arirang (Jeonjangpo arirang), 1985
- Korean Lovers (Hangugui yeonindeul), 1986
- Seoul Senoya, 1990
- Very Clear Stream of Water (Cham Malgeun Mulsal), 1996
- I Gave My Heart Before Flowers (Kkot-boda, Meonjeo Ma-eum-eul Jueonne), 1990

Essay Collections

- The Person I Loved, the World I Loved, 1993
- Kwas Jae-ju's Journal of Trips to Seaports, 2002

== See also ==
- Korean Literature
- List of Korean-language poets
