= Park Yong-rae =

South Korean poet (1925–1980)

- Born: August 14, 1925; Buyeo, South Chungcheong Province, Korea, Empire of Japan
- Died: November 21, 1980 (aged 55)
- Writing career
- Language: Korean
- Genre: Poetry

Korean name
- Hangul: 박용래
- Hanja: 朴龍來
- RR: Bak Yongrae
- MR: Pak Yongnae

Park Yong-rae (Korean: 박용래; August 14, 1925 – November 21, 1980) was a South Korean poet.

== Life ==
Park was born on August 14, 1925, in Buyeo, South Chungcheong Province, Korea, Empire of Japan and died November 21, 1980. He graduated from the Ganggyeong Commercial High School, and debuted his work in 1956 with the publication of "Song of Autumn". Park worked as a bank employee and teacher and middle and high schools. Park died on November 21, 1980.

== Works in Korean (selected) ==
- Snow Pellets (Ssaraknun, 1969)
- Foxtails (Gang-ajipul, 1975)
- Distant Sea (Meon Bada, 1984)

== Awards ==
- Korean Literature Author's Award (1980)
- Contemporary Poetry Prize (1969)
- Chungnam Culture Award (1961)

== See also ==
- Korean Literature
- List of Korean-language poets
