= Dongbaek Medal =

Civil award of the Republic of Korea

South Korea issues the Dongbaek Medal as a civil award

Dongbaek Medal (Korean: 동백장; Hanja: 東百章; lit. Camellia Emblem) is a civil award of the Republic of Korea. It is the third class of South Korea's Order of Civil Merit, which is the primary series of awards for Korean civilians. Recipients need not be South Korean civilians, however; the honour has been bestowed upon some foreigners.

Recipients of the Dongbaek Medal include:

- Alice Hammond Sharp (2020) Canadian born missionary and teacher; Founder of schools and mentor of Yu Gwan Sun.
- Vincent Courtenay (2014) Canadian veteran of the Korean War and veteran commemoration activist and Member of the 60th Anniversary of the Korean War Commemoration Committee, Republic of Korea (Presidential Order signed by President Park Geun-hye, March, 2014, upon recommendation of Minister of Patriots and Veterans Affairs of the Republic of Korea).
- Grace Bennett (1975), English Christian missionary to South Korea.
- Franklin A. Long (1975), US professor of chemistry.
- Kee-Ryo Chang (1976), Korean surgeon.
- Chae Shik Rho (1982), Korean environmental scientist.
- Yoo Yeong (1983), poet and translator
- Hogil Kim (1985), Korean professor of physics.
- Dieter Hans Kind (1988), German electrical engineer.
- Sun-Tae Kim (1989), Korean Christian theologian and minister.
- In Sun Wui (1992), Korean professor of biology.
- Hee Jung (Edward) Kim (1994), Korean photographer and first Asian Editor-in-Chief of National Geographic.
- Donald Chung (1999), US-based Korean physician and former soldier.
- William Miller (2000), US professor of physics and computer science.
- Youn-Ho Lee (2002), Korean politician.
- Chong Chul Rhee (2003), Australian-based Korean taekwondo master.
- Jun-Sik Han (2006), Korean health executive.
- Joseph Gonnella (year unspecified), US professor of medicine.
- Verent Mills (year unspecified), US Christian missionary to eastern Asia.
