= Kim Myeongin =

Korean author (born 1946)

- Born: September 2, 1946 (age 79)
- Occupations: Poet, professor
- Writing career
- Language: Korean

Korean name
- Hangul: 김명인
- Hanja: 金明仁
- RR: Gim Myeongin
- MR: Kim Myŏngin

Kim Myeongin (born September 2, 1946) is a South Korean poet and author.

== Life ==
Kim Myeongin was born on September 2, 1946, in Uljin, Gyeongsangbuk-do. He attended Hupo High School, and graduated from Korea University with a degree in Korean Literature. He received his Ph.D. from Korea University in 1985. Kim is currently a professor of Korean Literature at Korea University. Kim has been a visiting professor at Brigham Young University, USA, and at Far Eastern College, Russia. Along with Lee Jongok and Kim Myeongsu, Kim is a member of the literary coterie Anti-Poetry.

== Work ==
Kim made his literary debut in 1973 when his poem "Celebration for the Ship Leaving Port" won a literary contest sponsored by the JoongAng Ilbo. Running throughout Kim's poetry is an abiding concern with memory - not one of a beautiful past but one of suffering. In Kim's work, memory resembles a sickness, a disease which limits one's ability to move about freely. While memory is concerned with the past, it also possesses the power to torment the self living in the present. Insofar as it is only through direct confrontation with memory that the self can be healed, this memory of a scarred, wounded past, however, cannot be secreted away or forgotten. Memory in Kim's poetry centers around two overwhelmingly dark images - his father and the Korean War.

Born in 1946, Kim's childhood was inextricably entwined with the experience of war. This memory of a childhood shattered by war emerges in the poem "Kentucky House 1". As we see in the poem "Father in the Rain", the memory of receiving no protection in the midst of the extremities of war points to the rejection of a certain absolute, symbolized here by the father. By reviving memories of childhood suffering, the poet aims to release himself from past experiences which cloud his life in the present. Memory enables the poet to discover the other within the self; this other, in turn, opens new possibilities for the self. In Kim's poetry, then, confrontation with the past seeks to broaden one's range of emotions in order to open the possibility of true experience. As his career moved on, Kim Myeongin began by writing poems directly inspired by the sufferings of orphans and the most wretched in society, but then turned to subjects more often related to nature and more directly reflective of his own inner world.

== Awards ==
- Kim Daljin Literary Prize (1992)
- Sowol Poetry Prize (1992)
- Dongseo Literary Prize (1995)
- Contemporary Literature (Hyundae Munhak) Award (2000)
- Yi San Literary Prize (2001)
- Daesan Literary Prize - Poetry Section (2005)
- Lee Hyeonggi Literary Prize (2006)
- Jihoon Prize Literary Award (2007)
- Webzine <Si-in gwangjang> (Poets Square)'s This Year's Good Poem Award (2011)

== Works in Translation ==
- L'Accordéon de la mer et autres poèmes (French)

== Works in Korean (partial) ==
- Dongducheon (1979)
- Swanee Faraway (Meonameon got seuwani 1988)
- Playing with a Blue Puppy (Pureun gangaji nolda 1994)
- A Funeral by the Sea (Badaga-ui Jangrye 1997)
- Silence of the Street (Gil-ui chimmuk 1999)
- Sea Accordion (Bada-ui akodieon 2002)
- Ripple (Pamun 2005)
- Warm Stillness (Ttatteuthan jeokmak 2006)
- Inflorescence (Kkotcharye 2009)

== See also ==
- Korean literature
- List of Korean-language poets
