= Ko Hyeong-ryeol =

Korean poet

- Born: November 8, 1954 (age 71); Sokcho, Gangwon Province, South Korea
- Occupation: Poet

- Ko Hyeong-ryeol
- Hangul: 고형렬
- RR: Go Hyeongryeol
- MR: Ko Hyŏngnyŏl

Ko Hyeong-ryeol (The romanization preferred by the author according to LTI Korea) born 1954 is a modern Korean poet.

== Life ==
Ko Hyeong-ryeol was born in the town of Haenam at the southern tip of Korean Peninsula and grew up in Sokcho, Gangwon Province. After high school, Go passed an exam to become a government employee and worked as a clerk in his township. He made his literary debut in 1979 with "Zhuangzi" which was published in Contemporary Literature.

== Work ==
Ko is a poet of “peculiar” voice. Calm even as it discusses the history of Korean national division or the author's wish for Korean reunification, his poetic language carries the halting tone of a soliloquy muttered or a conversation initiated with difficulty. Though never exertive, Ko's poetry exudes the strength of compassion and warmth grounded in the poet's own perspective toward the world, which is not that of a distant observer but rather that of a close neighbor who meditates on things as though they are an immediate part of his life. As Ko has aged his work has become even more humble and pure in tone. Ko as often describes the world as full of sorrow and suffering, but his poetry also expresses life with compassion and understanding.

== Awards ==
- 2003 Jihun Literature Award
- 2006 Ilyeon Literature Award
- 2006 Baekseok Literature Prize
- 2006 Republic of Korea Culture and Arts Award
- 2009 Contemporary Literature (Hyundae Munhak) Award

== Major works ==
- Zhuangzi (1979)
- Watermelon Field at Daecheongbong (Daecheongbong subakbat 1985)(대청봉 수박밭)
- Haecheong (1987)
- How is Seoul (Seoul-eun Annyeonghan-ga 1991)
- Heavy Snow in Sajinri (Sajinri Daeseol 1993)(사진리 대설)
- Little Boy (Liteul boi 1995)
- I Miss a Garden Meal (Madang siksa-ga geuripda 1995)
- Frost Flower and Snow Buddha (Seong-ekkot nunbucheo 1998)
- A Sleeping Sister with a Slice of Bread in Her Hands (Ppang deul-go janeun eonni 2001)
- At Unho Garden Restaurant in Gimpo (Gimpo Unhogadeunjib-eseo 2001)

Essay Collections

- A Flower Bloomed in the Poems (Si sog-e kkot-i pieonne 2002)
- Silver-colored Fish (Eunbit mulgogi, 2003)
- Very Old Poems and Love Stories (Aju oraedoen si-wa sarang iyagi 2005)

== See also ==
- List of Korean-language poets
- Korean Literature
