= Jo Jeonggwon =

South Korean poet (1949–2017)

- Born: 22 February 1949; Seoul, South Korea
- Died: November 8, 2017 (aged 68)
- Writing career
- Language: Korean

Korean name
- Hangul: 조정권
- Hanja: 趙鼎權
- RR: Jo Jeonggwon
- MR: Cho Chŏnggwŏn

Jo Jeonggwon (Korean: 조정권, 22 February 1949 – 8 November 2017) was a South Korean poet and critic.

== Life ==
Jo Jeonggwon was born on 22 February 1949 in Seoul, Korea. He studied at Yangjeong High School and graduated with a degree in English. He received his BA in English education from Chung-Ang University. He worked as a manager in the Korean Culture and Arts Foundation from 1994 until his death.

== Work ==
Jo Jeonggwon made his official literary debut in 1970 when "Blackboard" (Heukpan) and other poems were recommended for publication in Contemporary Poetics (Hyeondae sihak). Jo made his debut as a poet in October 1970, at the recommendation of Pak Mok-wol.

The lyric verse of Jo Jeonggwon is robust and highly confrontational. In his works, the poet throws himself into violent conflict with his subjects, and writes with a clear suppleness deriving from his confrontational style. His poetry engenders a clear feeling of pure and simple poetic sentiments. Indeed, these clear and simple emotions form the very essence of his poetry inform the driving force of his poetry's incessant transformation. His poetic journey, beginning with his early poem "Him" (Strength) up to "Sanjeongmyoji" reveals the poet's artistic vitality and pliable sensibility.

The linked poems of "Sanjeongmyoji" feature images of a mountain shimmering in the cold of the winter and the dynamic ascent of the poet's sturdy spirit. This truth-seeking climb dealt with in this work metaphorically attempts to reach the summit through perseverance free from the idle rest of the mundane world. The climb is also intended to rebuke the corrupt world in an effort to attain a higher, transcendental world.

His awards included the Korean Poets' Association Prize (Hanguk siinhyeophoesang) in 1988, Kim Suyeong Literature Prize in 1991, and the Kim Sowol Poetry Prize in 1991.

== Works in Korean (partial) ==
- Seven States of Mind for Observing Rain (Bireul baraboneun ilgopgaji maeumui hyeongtae, 1977)
- Book of Psalms (Sipyeon, 1982)
- Songs of an Open Mind (Heosimsong, 1985)
- Sky Quilt (Haneul ibul, 1987)
- Summit Grave (Sanjeongmyoji, 1991)

== Awards ==
- Nokwon Literary Award (1985)
- Prize for Poetry, Korean Poets' Association (1988)
- Sowol Poetry Prize (1991)
- Kim Suyeong Literary Award (1991)

== See also ==
- List of Korean-language poets
- Korean poetry
- Korean literature
