= Kim Gu-yong =

Korean poet and calligrapher (1922–2001)

- Occupation: Poet
- Writing career
- Pen name: Kim Kku
- Language: Korean

- Korean name
- Hangul: 김구용
- Hanja: 金丘庸
- RR: Gim Guyong
- MR: Kim Kuyong

Kim Gu-yong (Korean: 김구용; February 5, 1922 – December 28, 2001), pen name Kim Kku, was a poet and calligrapher living in what is now South Korea. His poetry showed the spirit of Taoism but also reflected Buddhism. He was a graduate of Seongkyungwan University (1955) and later a professor at the same school.

== Biography ==
Kim Gu-yong was born Kim Yeongtak on February 5, 1922, in Sangju, Keishōhoku Province, Korea, Empire of Japan. During Japanese colonial occupation, Kim resided at various Buddhist temples, including the Donghaksa Temple, studying Buddhist, Confucian, and Taoist classic texts. Following Liberation, Kim entered Sungkyunkwan University in Seoul, and graduated with a degree in Korean Literature. Kim made his official literary debut in 1949 while still a student, with the publication of "Night in the Mountains" (Sanjungya) and "Ode to a White Pagoda" (Baegtapsong) in New World. Kim worked for the Hyundai Munhak Monthly and taught at Kyun Kwan University.

== Work ==
During the period marked by the devastating aftermath of the Korean War, Kim Gu-yong focused his poetic objective on the treatment of the postwar psychosocial and political upheaval, through the unique lens of the Buddhist religious tradition. In his poetry dating from the period, Kim utilized the form of the prose poem, which eschews the internal breaks and divisions created by the lines and stanza of traditional verses. To maintain a poetic element within his work, Kim employed a poetic language rich in semantic possibility. In fact, the absence of rigid versification in his works ultimately serves to heighten the tension in this poetic language.

Kim's poetic career witnessed a transition from the prose poem of the post-Korean War period to longer poems such as "Song in Praise of the Buddhist Goddess of Mercy" (Gwaneumchan), "Ideals of the Dream" (Kkumui isang), and "Six Songs" (Yukgok). These longer poems evince the poet's desire to penetrate to the core of self-consciousness, though they also possess a philosophical profundity otherwise difficult to effectively convey in shorter poetry. Though grounded in Buddhist thought, Kim's poetry reveals the deep influence of Western surrealism in the development of the poet's aesthetic. His concurrent borrowing from the prose form, however, suggests foremost the poet's penchant for experimentation and desire to reinvent and reinvigorate traditional versification. Thus in both form and content, the poetry of Kim Guyong forged a new path in the development of modern Korean poetry.

== Works in Korean ==
Collections

- Poems 1 (1969)
- Poems (1976)
- Nine Melodies (1978)

Notable Poems

- "Song in Praise of the Buddhist Goddess of Mercy" (Gwaneumchan)
- "Ideals of the Dream" (Kkumui isang)
- "Six Songs" (Yukgok)
- "Night in the mountains" (Sanjungya)
- "Ode on a White Pagoda" (Baegtapsong)
- "Escape" (Talchul)
- "Heart of Radiance" (Bungwangui simjang)
- "Scattered" (Sanjae)
- "Naked Slave" (Jeongnarahan noye)

== See also ==
- Korean literature
- List of Korean-language poets

== Sources ==
- whatsonkorea.com
- "김구용 시의 물 이미지 고찰" (Chungnam University dissertation by 민명자): dbpia.co.kr
- 김구용: 전집 저자 [complete works] 출판정보 : 솔/2000.
- .
- Autobiographical notes:
- Nate encyclopedia article:
- Photo on people.empas.com
