= Franklin A. Long =

American chemist

Franklin Asbury Long (July 27, 1910 – February 8, 1999) was an American chemist notable for his activities in arms reduction as well as for his research in reaction mechanisms of organic molecules in solutions.

Long served on the President's Science Advisory Committee for Dwight D. Eisenhower, John F. Kennedy and Lyndon B. Johnson. He also was assistant director of the United States Arms Control and Disarmament Agency, chairman of the chemistry department at Cornell University, a member of the National Academy of Sciences, a recipient of Dongbaeg Medal, the Charles Lathrop Parsons Award from the American Chemical Society, Henry Luce Professor of Science and Society, a member and vice president of the American Academy of Arts and Sciences. He also was in charge of the Cornell University's program on science, technology and society, as well as of its peace studies program.

== Career and life ==
Long was born in Great Falls, Montana. He received A.B. and M.A. degrees from the University of Montana in 1931 and 1932, respectively. He received a doctorate in chemistry in 1935 at the University of California at Berkeley. He joined Cornell University in 1937, advancing to full professor in 1946 and then to chairman of the chemistry department.
