= Lee Sungboo =

South Korean poet and novelist

Lee SungBoo
- Born: January 22, 1942; Gwangju, Zenranan Province, Korea, Empire of Japan
- Died: February 28, 2012 (aged 70)
- Writing career
- Language: Korean

Korean name
- Hangul: 이성부
- Hanja: 李盛夫
- RR: I Seongbu
- MR: I Sŏngbu

Lee SungBoo (from 이성부; 1942-2012) was a South Korean poet and novelist.

== Life ==
Lee SungBoo was born January 22, 1942, in Kwangju, South Jeolla Province, South Korea. While he was attending Gwangju High School in 1959, his works were recognized in a literary contest sponsored by the Jeonnam Ilbo. He later became a member of Taegwang and Sunmunhak and studied under Kim Hyeonseung, Lee graduated from Kyunghee University with a degree in Korean literature, and worked for the Hankook Ilbo.

== Work ==
LTI Korea summarizes Lee's work:

The majority of Lee Seongbu's works, especially those pieces written in the 1960s and 1970s, were born out of the poet's passionate and furious desire to let the voice of the repressed be heard. Thus, the anger reflected in his poems originated from the external world, or contemporary society, rather than from his inner psyche or from nature. These works aimed to express the lives of the people ignored and tortured throughout history. The images of "darkness" and "night" that frequently appear in his poems, for example, convey acceptance of defeat and repression yet also the willingness to overcome such a reality and its limitations. As seen in "All Night Long", however, the image of "night" is not always negatively portrayed. When love and understanding for the repressed expands, the image of "night" transforms into a time and place for celebration.
The poet also believed that genuine anger towards the reality of repression derived from the experience and perseverance of suffering and adversity inherent in life. Thus through such perseverance, compassion and love for those who have repressed and ignored throughout history is bound to grow. The poet also believed that bearing what life has to offer is the true way to surmount sadness and defeat. Accordingly, his poerms are noted for his apt diction and style, which tell of the reality of the external world, in order to bring to light the happenings of the inner world.

== Works in Korean (Partial) ==
Novels

- Night of Dissipation (Somoui bam)(1961)
- Our Meal (Urideurui yangsik) (1974)
- Daylight (Baekju) (1977)

Poems

- Collected Works of Lee Seongbu (Lee Seongbu Sijip)
- Our Food (Minumsa, 1974)
- Paekche Poems (Changjak Gwa Bipyong-sa, 1977)
- The Night Before (Changjak Gwa Bipyong-sa, 1981)
- Leaving the Empty Mountain (Pulbit, 1989)

== Awards ==
- Contemporary Literature (Hyundae Munhak) Award in 1969
- 4th Korean Literature Writers Award in 1977
- Daesan Literature Award for Poetry in 2001
- Kyunghee Literature Award in 2011
- 가천환경문학상 시부문 in 2007
- 공초문학상 in 2010
