= Kim Yeong-hyeon =

South Korean writer (1955–2025)

- Born: 3 February 1955
- Died: 9 May 2025 (aged 70)
- Writing career
- Language: Korean

Korean name
- Hangul: 김영현
- RR: Gim Yeonghyeon
- MR: Kim Yŏnghyŏn

Kim Yeong-hyeon (Korean: 김영현; 3 February 1955 – 9 May 2025) was a South Korean poet, novelist and publisher.

== Background ==
Like many intellectuals of the time, Kim was the target of oppression during the 30 years of dictatorship after the partition of Korea into North and South. In 1977, Kim was in college when he was arrested for his participation in a student movement. When he was released from prison after serving a two-year sentence, Kim was inducted into the Korean Army.

Kim died on 9 May 2025, at the age of 70.

== Work ==
At the end of the 1980s, Kim and other writers published so-called "after-the-fact" stories exposing the atrocities committed by the military dictatorship. His first collection of short stories, entitled A Deep River Flows Far was a product of the author's experience. Kim also served as the publisher of Silcheonmunhak, a popular literary quarterly.

Although "after-the-fact" stories diminished in popularity over the years, Kim continued to write about the people who have suffered, fought and perished under political oppression. Kim claimed that we do not talk about the past because we ourselves have changed over time and have simply forgotten. For him, the past was the very foundation of the life we have now.

Kim's books are a testament to his stubborn engagement with the events of modern Korean history. Kim believed that literature is grounded, created and manifested in reality; and only as such, can it attain the power to heal wounded souls.

=== Works in Korean (partial) ===
Short story collections:

- A Deep River Flows Far (1990)
- The Road to Haenam (1992)

Novels

- Young Lord (1993)
- Heavy Snow (2002)

Poetry Collections

- Winter Sea (1988)
- A South Sea Postcard (1994)

Children's Books

- Adventure of Ttolgae (2000)
