= Lee Youn-taek =

South Korean writer

- Born: July 9, 1952 (age 74); Busan, South Korea
- Education: Korea National Open University
- Occupations: Poet; dramatist; producer
- Writing career
- Period: 1978–2018

Korean name
- Hangul: 이윤택
- Hanja: 李潤澤
- RR: I Yuntaek
- MR: I Yunt'aek

Lee Youn-taek (Korean: 이윤택; born July 9, 1952) is a poet, dramatist, and producer.

== Biography ==
Lee Youn-taek was born on July 9, 1952, in South Korea. A poet, dramatist and producer, Lee debuted in 1979 with Jack-O-Lantern (Dokkaebi bul) which appeared in the magazine Contemporary Poetry. As the 1970s ended Lee worked as a reporter for Busan Daily while also focusing on writing and staging plays. In 1986, Lee formed his own theatrical company called Yeonhuidan georipae in Busan and since that time has traveled around the country staging plays.

== Work ==
According to the Korea Literature Translation Institute:

Lee has proved his talents many times over through his production of movie scenarios, TV drama scripts, dance and musical stagings, and theatrical programs for international events. He is not only able to span a broad range of artistic forms, but also brings something new and experimental to each project he undertakes. He injects Korean sentiment and unique humor into his art forms, and is thus widely known as a "cultural guerilla". While Lee's themes generally contain something of the dark and serious, his stages teem with a vibrant energy. His plays contemplate and investigate human "lives" inching their way to their mortality. Even after a hearty laugh, the audience is always left with much to reflect on.

Lee has been active as a director at the National Theatre, where he directed a musical version of Shakespeare's The Tempest in 1999. His production of a musical entitled Dreaming at Hwaseong (Hwaseong-eseo ggum ggunda) performed at world cultural heritage sites, is but one of his many continuing theatrical experimentations.

His movies have included:

- 2003 Ogu (writer and director)
- 1997 Model (TV series)
- 1991 Seoul Evita (co-writer)
- 1990 Danji geudaega yeojalaneun iyumaneulo

== Controversy ==
On February 13, 2018, several women, including former actress Kim Soo-hee and actress Hong Seon-joo, accused Lee Youn-taek of sexual harassment. Lee allegedly forced many women in his theater troupe, for 18 years, to massage his genital area prior to raping them. In addition, Kim Soo-hee stated that in 2005, Lee raped her and got her pregnant, for which she had an abortion. Moreover, actress Hong Seon-joo alleged that Lee forcibly penetrated her private part with sticks and wooden chopsticks, saying it will help her vocalization. As a result, Lee resigned from all his positions in the theater world and formally apologized to the victims.

== Works in Translation ==
Four contemporary Korean plays (이윤택 희곡선)

== Works in Korean (Partial) ==
- -Ogu-Method of Death (Ogu-jugeumui hyeongsik; 1989)
- Gaettong Beyond the Mountains (San neomeo gaettonga)
- Hamlet (Haemlit; 1996) - See also Shamanism in Korean "Hamlets" since 1990: Exorcising Han.
- Beauty (Gain)
- Dumb Bride (Babo gaksi), Dosolga
- Every Living Day is a Festival (Sarainneun donganeun nalmada chukje)
- Citizen K (Simin K)
- Yeonsan, A Problematic Human Being (Munjejeok ingan Yeonsan; 1995)
- Faust in Jeans (Cheongbajireul ibeun pauseuteu).

== Awards ==
- Dong-a Drama Award
- Daesan Literary Award (1995)
- Paeksang Arts Grand Prize
- Seoul Play Festival Grand Prize
