= Ko Chang-soo =

Korean poet and diplomat (born 1934)

- Hangul: 고창수
- Hanja: 高昌秀
- RR: Go Changsu
- MR: Ko Ch'angsu

Ko Chang-soo (Korean: 고창수; born December 5, 1934) is a South Korean poet and diplomat.

Chang was born in Hungnam, Korea, Empire of Japan.

Chang obtained a Doctor of Letters degree from Sungkyunkwan University in Seoul, Korea. He wrote his dissertation on Buddhist thoughts in T. S. Eliot's Four Quartets. He served his country as a career diplomat, serving as South Korean consul general in Seattle, Washington in the United States and ambassador to Ethiopia and Pakistan.

His poetry is written in Korean, but he has translated much of his own as well as other Korean poetry. In addition to publishing having a number poetry collections, he has had poems published in such journals as World Poetry, Viewpoint 11, and Curious Cats. Ko has won various Korean poetry prizes as well as the Lucian Blaga International Poetry Festival Grand Prize in Romania. Some of his poetry has also been translated into Spanish. He also has won the Modern Korean Literature Translation Award.

Much of Ko's poetry reflects his knowledge of Western culture and literature, as seen in such poems as "To Marc Chagall." Other poems examine and reflect on his experience in Korea (e.g., "In a Remote Korean Village") and other places around the world (e.g., his long poem, "Mohenjo-Daro"). Many, though not all, of his poems are set out-of-doors. Some of these place the poet in the setting.

== Publications ==
- What the Spider Said: Poems of Chang Soo Ko. Translated by the poet. (2004)
- Between Sound and Silence: Poems of Chang Soo Ko. Hollym: Elizabeth, NJ /Seoul. 2000. (Poems in original Korean and with English translations by the poet.)
- Sound of Silence: Poems. Leo Books. (1996)
- Seattle Poems. Poetry Around Press, Seattle. (1992)
- Park, Je-chun 1997 Sending the Ship out to the Stars: Poems of Park Je-chun. Translated from the Korean by Ko Chang-soo. East Asia Program, Cornell University: Ithaca, NY.

== Sources and external links ==
- About Ko: https://web.archive.org/web/20060909180100/http://langtech.dickinson.edu/sirena/Issue4/Ko.htm
- https://web.archive.org/web/20100124052721/http://www.homabooks.com/general/books/east_asia/korea/1024.php (includes "Ex-diplomat Poet Weaves Metaphors from Spider Web" by Iris Moon, The Korea Herald
- McCann, Daniel 2000 "Preface" to Between Sound and Silence.
- Some of his poems in English: https://web.archive.org/web/20070928003705/http://www.poemworld.co.kr/lhw/reboard/list.php3?custom=poem
- some of his poems in English: https://web.archive.org/web/20070927121357/http://www.munhakac.co.kr/reboard/list.php3?custom=English

Diplomatic posts
Preceded by Kim D.	Ambassador of Republic of Korea to Ethiopia; 1987–1990	Succeeded by Kim S.
Preceded by Kim J.	Ambassador of Republic of Korea to Pakistan; 1993–1996	Succeeded by Keum J.
