= Chae Ho-ki =

South Korean poet (born 1957)

- Born: October 13, 1957 (age 69)
- Citizenship: South Korean
- Writing career
- Language: Korean

- Korean name
- Hangul: 채호기
- Hanja: 蔡好基
- RR: Chae Hogi
- MR: Ch'ae Hogi

Chae Ho-ki (Korean: 채호기; born 13 October 1957) is a modern South Korean poet.

== Biography ==
Chae Ho-ki was born on October 13, 1957, in Daegu, South Korea and published his first poem in 1988 and since that time has been considered by South Korean critics as one of the major voices in Korean literature.

== Work ==
If a desire for emotional union with the subject matter can be described as a general characteristic of Korean poetry, Chae departs radically from such a tendency to seek instead the complete obliteration of the boundary between the subject and the language in his poetry. His first volume of poetry, Ferocious Love, rejects love as an idea and an emotional state and focuses on its physicality and mortality:

like the train daggering into the dark cave of your body
Blue blade pierces death
This ferocious love
Burying your casket in my womb
So I bury my casket in your womb.

Desire itself is objectified and given a physicality in "The Sad Gay", in which a gay man transforms himself into another being through the mechanical process of replacing body parts:

Your two eyes on my palm
I pull out my eyes and inserts them into the sockets.
...
Plucking all my hair out
I cover my head with your hair

Chae's most successful attempt to create a oneness with another is judged to be his Water Lilies. In this volume of poetry, language acts as a corrosive agent that melts away the external shape of things to reveal their true essence by means of which a perfect union with others is achieved.

== Works in Korean (partial) ==
Poetry collections

- Ferocious Love (Jidokhan sarang, 1992)
- The Sad Gay (Seulpen gaei, 1994)
- A Telephone of the Night (Bamui gongjung jeonhwa, 1997)
- Water Lilies (Suryeon, 2002)

== Awards ==
- 2002 Kim Suyeong Literary Award, for Water Lilies
- 2007 올해의 출판인상 Award
- 2007 National Contemporary Poetry Award
