= Choe Jeongrye =

South Korean poet (1955–2021)

- 최정례
- Born: 1955; South Korea
- Died: 16 January 2021 (aged 65–66)
- Education: Korea University (Ph.D.)
- Writing career
- Language: Korean

- Korean name
- Hangul: 최정례
- Hanja: 崔正禮
- RR: Choe Jeongrye
- MR: Ch'oe Chŏngnye

Choe Jeongrye (Korean: 최정례; 1955 – 16 January 2021) was a modern South Korean poet.

== Biography ==
Choe Jeongrye was born in 1955 in Hwaseong, Gyeonggi Province, South Korea. She graduated with a doctorate degree in Korean poetry from Korea University. She participated in the (International Writing Program) (IWP) as a poet at University of Iowa in 2006 and stayed one year at University of California, Berkeley as a visiting writer in 2009. Her poems have been printed in Free Verse: A Journal of Contemporary Poetry & Poets, Iowa Review, Text Journal, World Literature Today, and various Korean and Japanese literary magazines. An English-language collection, Instances (which she co-translated), was published in 2011. Choe was a lecturer at Korea University.

She died in 2021 from cerebral hemorrhage after having been diagnosed a year earlier with hemophagocytic lymphohistiocytosis, a rare blood disease.

== Work ==
Many of Choe's poems were about time and memory. She typically used fragments of time and memory as tools for looking into others and the world, or for identifying herself. What ultimately emerged from her exploration of fragmented memories and chaos of time was the sense of emptiness and loneliness: the core of existence.

Choe's poetic language was straightforward and condensed. She used simple language, subverting plain words to make them unfamiliar and strange. In Instances, her work is described as having:

"... a quality of imagination in her work that is still a rare thing in poetry—despite the opening up of form, content, and linguistic exploration that current innovative poetry has given us in the last few decades. Choi uses the image less for description than as enactment — almost as if the residue of the phantom in the poet's brain were an action in itself — of reality."

"Choi's images are what might be termed "surreal," but they are also "magical realism," and at times quite abstract. ... Her style of image-making has odd wit and sweep; she makes the memory a layered reality that speaks to the current poetic moment. Her reality is a braid of metaphor, memory, intellect, and feeling. ... Images can be quite radical—and the dazzle of Jeongrye's work can remind American readers about the mental variety and hopes for art brought from Modernism."

Choe received several awards for her writing, including the Baekseok Literature Prize, Midang Literary Award, and Ojangwhan Literature Prize.

== Works in translation ==
- Instances: Selected Poems (최정례 시선, 2011), translated by Wayne de Fremery, Brenda Hillman, and Choe Jeongrye
- Lightmesh (빛그물, 2026), translated by Sue Hyon Bae and Mattho Mandersloot

== Works in Korean (partial) ==
- A Forest of Bamboo in My Ear (내 귓속의 장대나무 숲, 1994)
- Tigers in the Sunlight (햇빛 속에 호랑이, 1998)
- Crimson Field (붉은 밭, 2001)
- Lebanese Emotion (레바논 감정, 2006)
- Kangaroo is Kangaroo I am I (캥거루는 캥거루고 나는 나인데, 2011)
- Ditch is Dragon's Hometown (개천은 용의 홈타운, 2015)
- Light Net (빛그물, 2020)

== Awards ==
- Kimdaljin Literature Prize (1999)
- Yi-su Prize (2003)
- Modern Literature Prize (2007)
- Baekseok Literature Prize (2012)
- Midang Literary Award (2015)
- Ojangwhan Literature Prize (2015)
