= Yoo Yeong =

South Korean literary scholar (1917–2002)

- Born: November 24, 1917; Yongin, Korea, Empire of Japan
- Died: August 25, 2002 (aged 84)
- Occupations: Professor in English Literature, translator, poet

Academic background
- Education: Yonhei College, Seoul National University

Yoo Yeong (Korean: 유영; Hanja: 柳玲; November 24, 1917 – August 25, 2002) was a South Korean literary scholar, translator, and poet.

He was a professor at the Department of English Language and Literature of Yonsei University in Seoul, South Korea from 1956 to 1983. He taught English Poetry at school, his specialty being in John Milton and Rabindranath Tagore. He was given the Dongbaeg Medal (the third class of South Korea’s Order of Civil Merit) by the South Korean government for his contribution to education when he retired from his professorate in 1983. He translated many literary works such as Homer’s Iliad and Odyssey, Milton’s Paradise Lost and Paradise Regained into Korean. He was the first Korean to translate the complete collection of Tagore’s poetry.

He is also known for his acquaintance with one of the most well-known poets in Korea, Yun Dong-ju. After the poet’s death, Yoo’s memorial poem for his friend was included in the first edition of Yun’s posthumously published collection of poems. Being a poet himself, Yoo published his own poems under the titles Day and Night (日月) (1970), The Preface of Air and Earth (天地序) (1975), The Mind is a Wing (마음은 날개) (1992) and so on. A translation award is being given under his name (Yoo Yeong Translation Award) since 2007.

== Life ==
Yoo was born in 1917 in Yongin, Korea, Empire of Japan. Before he went to public school, he was taught at a traditional Korean village school (서당) at the age of six. He went to Yonhi College (later Yonsei University) in 1938. Graduating from school in 1943, he worked at the newspaper Keijō Nippō until 1945. He was arrested and imprisoned for 6 months by the Japanese government under the security law set during the Japan’s Occupation of Korea. After the Japanese occupation of the country ended in 1945, he majored in English Literature at Seoul National University. He worked at Taesung High School as a teacher from 1948 to 1956. He was a professor at Yonsei University from 1956 to his retirement in 1983.

== Works ==
Yoo’s main study on literature was on John Milton and Rabindranath Tagore. His study on Milton, A Study of the Miltonic Epic: Its Poetic Structures from Aesthetic Point of View (밀튼의 敍事詩硏究: 그 美學的 構成論), was introduced in John M. Steadman’s Epic and Tragic Structure in Paradise Lost (published in 1967) as one of the “recent studies of Milton’s major poetry, its structure, and its relations to epic and tragic tradition.” His lifelong study on Tagore was published as The Literature of Tagore: The Aesthetics of its Myth and Mystery (타골의 文學: 그 神話와 神秘의 美學) in 1983. His scholarly world also includes comparisons between literatures of the West and the East. In The Aesthetic Perception of the Western and Eastern literature (동서문학의 미학적 인식), he traces the common themes that reoccur in both the Western and Eastern region’s literatures.

== Yoo Yeong Translation Award ==
In 2007, Yoo Yeong’s son, Yoo Hyuksoo established a translation award under the name of his father in order to remember his contribution to the translation history in Korea. The award is given every year on November at Yonsei University. Yoo Yeong Translation Symposium has been held at the same day and place since 2016. The award is being co-sponsored by Yoo Yeong Research Foundation and the Department of English Language and Literature of Yonsei University. In 2017, the award was given to Uhm Il-nyeo who translated Sarah Waters’ “The Little Stranger.”

== Relationship with Yun Dong-ju ==
Yoo was one of the closest friends of the well-known Korean poet Yun Dong-ju. He entered Yonhi College in the same year with the poet. They lived at the same lodging house and wrote poems together with their fellow school colleagues. In an interview with MBC news in 1995, Yoo remembered the poet Yun to have had a sincere and warm smiling attitude, his entire life being a poem (“가장 뚜렷이 기억나는 것은 그 사람의 성실한, 태도, 윤동주의. 그리고 아주 빙그레 웃는 따뜻한 태도. 아마 그 사람은 사는 게 전부 시였으니까”). Yoo’s memorial poem for his friend was included in the first edition of the poet Yun’s posthumously published collection of poems.

== Published works ==
=== Translations ===
- Homer, 일리어드; 오딧세이 (Iliad; Odyssey) (Jeongeumsa, 1959)
- Robert Louis Stevenson, 이중인간 (Dr. Jekyll and Mr. Hyde) (Yangmunsa, 1959)
- Tagore, 타골選集 (Selected Works of Tagore) (Eulyoo Publishing Co., Ltd, 1962)
- John Milton, 失樂園; 復樂園 (Paradise Lost; Paradise Regained) (Eulyoo Publishing Co., Ltd, 1963)
- Tagore, 타골詩選 (Selected Poems of Tagore) (Eulyoo Publishing Co., Ltd, 1969)
- D. H. Lawrence, 아들과 戀人; 채털리 夫人의 사랑 (Sons and Lovers; Lady Chatterley’s Lover) (Dongsuh Publishers, 1975)
- Tagore, 고라 (Korah) (Bumwoosa, 1991)
- Virgil, 아에네이스 (Aeneis) (Hyewonchulpansa, 1994)
- Younghill Kang, 동양선비 서양에 가다 (East Goes West) (Bumwoosa, 2000)

=== Poetry ===
- 日月 (Day and Night) (Jeongeumsa, 1970)
- 天地序 (The Preface of Air and Earth) (Jungangchulpansagongsa, 1975)
- 마음은 날개 (The Mind is a Wing) (Pureumchulpansa, 1992)
- 춤추는 바벨탑 (A Dancing Babel Tower) (Doseochulpan gyeongwon, 1994)
- 너와 나의 랑데뷰 (Rendezvous of You and Me) (Pureumchulpansa, 2000)
