= Cheon Yanghui =

South Korean poet (born 1942)

- 천양희
- Born: January 21, 1942 (age 84); Busan, Korea, Empire of Japan
- Citizenship: South Korean
- Writing career
- Language: Korean

- Cheon Yanghui
- Hangul: 천양희
- Hanja: 千良姬
- RR: Cheon Yanghui
- MR: Ch'ŏn Yanghŭi

Cheon Yanghui (Korean: 천양희, born January 21, 1942) is a South Korean poet, best known for her poetry collection Sorghum Field of the Heart (마음의 수수밭, 1994).

== Life ==
Cheon Yanghui was born in Busan, Keishōnan Province, Korea, Empire of Japan on January 21, 1942, as the youngest of seven children. Throughout her childhood she was heavily influenced by her father, an enthusiast of poetry and pansori, and by her grandfather, a lay Buddhist. She often wrote and recited poems, despite being unable to participate in art festivals due to administrative issues at her school. In 1962 Cheon enrolled in Ewha Womans University, graduating with a degree in Korean literature.

== Career ==
Cheon Yanghui's career followed an unusual trajectory in that she began publishing in her 20s, stopped for nearly two decades, then resumed publishing poetry in her 40s, to great critical acclaim. Her literary debut was in 1965, when the prestigious literary magazine Hyundae Munhak published three of her poems - "Once in a Garden" (정원 한때), "Harmony" (화음), and "Morning" (아침) - thanks to a recommendation from Pak Dujin. After Cheon Yanghui married in 1969, she stopped writing and publishing poetry, although she eventually divorced her husband and became the manager of a dressmaker's shop. During this time she also suffered from tuberculosis and a heart condition. In 1983 Cheon returned to poetry by publishing the collection If God Asks Us (신이 우리에게 묻는다면).

While many of Cheon Yanghui's earlier works reflect on an isolated self, more of her later poems - beginning with her most well-known poetry collection Sorghum Field of the Heart (마음의 수수밭, 1994) - focus more on the everyday hardships, sorrows, and frustrations of living a more "typical" life. From her more mature perspective, Cheon was able to write eloquently about what insights she had learned over the past several decades of her life. More recent publications, such as Too Many Mouths (너무 많은 입, 2005), further elaborate on her perspective of what it means to write and publish poetry in modern society.

Cheon Yanghui has received the Sowol Poetry Prize, the Contemporary Literature (Hyundae Munhak) Award, Gong Cho Literature Award, Pak Dujin Literary Award, and Manhae Literature Prize.

== Works ==
=== Poetry collections ===
- If God Asks Us (신이 우리에게 묻는다면, 1984)
- Sorghum Field of the Heart (마음의 수수밭, 1994)
- Old Alley (오래된 골목, 1998)
- Too Many Mouths (너무 많은 입, 2005)
- Sometimes I Stand Motionless (나는 가끔 우두커니가 된다, 2011)

=== Essay collections ===
- Into Jikso Fall (직소포에 들다, 2004)
- Strolling in the Forest of Poetry (시의 숲을 거닐다, 2006)
- When in Desperation, We Always Kneel Down (간절함 앞에서는 언제나 무릎을 꿇게 된다, 2013)
- I Am a Wind That Does Not Howl (나는 울지 않는 바람이다, 2014)
- Writing Class (작가 수업, 2015)

=== Works in translation ===
- Poems in Korean Literature Today Vol 4, No 4, Winter, 1999
- Poems in 詩と創造 Vol 59

== Awards ==
- 1996: Sowol Poetry Prize - for "Fastening Buttons" (단추를 채우면서)
- 1998: Contemporary Literature (Hyundae Munhak) Award - for "Old Alley" and four others (「오래된 골목」외 4편)
- 2005: Gong Cho Literature Prize
- 2007: Pak Dujin Literary Award
- 2011: Han Yong-un Literature Prize
