= Choi Seungho =

South Korean poet (born 1954)

Choi Seung-Ho
- Born: 1954 (age 71–72)
- Writing career
- Language: Korean

Korean name
- Hangul: 최승호
- Hanja: 崔勝鎬
- RR: Choe Seungho
- MR: Ch'oe Sŭngho

Choi Seungho (Korean: 최승호; born 1954) is a South Korean poet. He has been described as an ecopoet. His publications also include children's poetry. He was born in the small rural village of Chungcheong, Gangwon Province, in 1954, and taught for many years in an elementary school in the countryside.

In 2004, the Daesan Foundation sponsored him and other writers in fora in Mexico and Cuba. In 2007, the Korea Literature Translation Institute sponsored him at ARCO in Malaga City, Spain.

== Work ==
Choi's work focuses on the environment and modern society's impact on it, in particular, the crisis brought on by rapid industrialization and the consequent vulgarization of human life in a capitalistic society. Choi uses images of "waste"—basements, drains, and toilets filled with waste material and the rank smell emanating from them to symbolize the corruption dominating urban landscape. Despite such offensive images, the tone of his poetry remains thoughtful and meditative and the poet never descends to vulgar word play. He looks upon the corrupt world with the metaphysical awareness of a Buddhist monk.

Buddhism and Taoism have been influential in the formation of Lee's poetic sensibility. As an aspiring poet, he often immersed himself in intense contemplation of a chosen topic to increase concentration and mental clarity. The mental pain that accompanies such intellectual exercises has burnt itself into his face. To his credit, his poetry does not flaunt an overtly religious tone although his fervor is that of a religious disciple.

Although Choi has stated that he seeks to merge "The Way of Poetry" and "the Way of Truth," he does not identify poetry as the truth itself, but rather as a process of reaching the truth. From the critique of urban vulgarity and secular desires, Choi's poetry has evolved to a philosophical exploration of the origin of all creation. In more recent prose poems he applies his powers of close observation to suggest compassionate contemplation as a remedy:

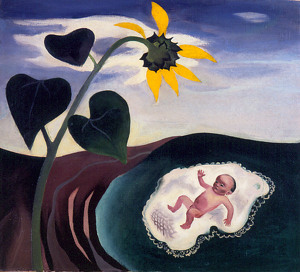
"If the sunflower had two arms"

The sun shines overhead, but the lanky sunflower has fallen low to the ground. If the sunflower had two arms, however short, maybe it would not lie collapsed as it does as if to bury its face into the earth. The face of the sunflower lying on its side: Buddha himself assumed such a posture when he entered nirvana. Nirvana on the road. Death on the road, where we are from and where we return in the end. But the sunflower insists on a life in one spot, and lives as if to bury its face under its roots, with its back against the long, summer sun.

== Works in translation ==
- Flowers in the Toilet Bowl: Selected Poems of Choi Seungho, Paramus NJ 2004
- A selection in Cracking the Shell: Three Korean Eco-poets, Paramus NJ 2006
- Autobiographie aus Eis (얼음의 자서전)

== Works in Korean (partial) ==
- Poetry Collections
- Snow Storm Warning (Daeseol juibo, 1983)
- Hedgehog Village (Goseumdochieui maeul, 1985)
- Riding a Mud Ox (Jinheuk soreul tago, 1987)
- The Pleasure of Secular City (Sesok dosieui jeulgeoum, 1990)
- The Night of Gangrenes (Hoijeoui bam, 1993)
- Firefly Preservation Area (Banditbul bohoguyeok, 1995)
- Snowman (Nunsaram, 1996)
- Grotesque (Geuroteseukeu, 1999)
- Sandman (Morae ingan, 2000)
- I Am Everything Though Nothing (Amugeotdo animyeonseo modeun geotin na, 2003).

== Awards ==
- Kim Suyeong Literary Award (1985)
