= An Heon-mi =

South Korean poet

An Heon-mi (Korean: 안현미; born 1972) is a South Korean poet. She won the Shin Dong-yup Literature Prize in 2010 for her second poetry collection, Ibyeorui jaeguseong.

== Biography ==
An was born in Taebaek, South Korea. Due to poverty, she attended vocational high school rather than regular high school. During high school days, she was an active member of the school's literature club, but upon graduation, she had to work as an office clerk for a major company. Then in her late 20s, she attended college by taking evening classes, majoring in creative writing at Seoul National University of Science and Technology. Working by day and writing poems by night, she debuted in 2001 as poet by publishing "Gomgom" (곰곰 Bear Bear), "Hasisi" (하시시 Hashish) and other poems.

An's first poetry collection, 곰곰 (Bear Bear; 2006), is mainly about her own experiences and daily life. Poems "Oktapbang" (옥탑방 The Rooftop Room) and "Telegraph Lies" (거짓말을 타전하다) reflect upon her own experience of living in a shabby rooftop room in Ahyeon-dong, Seoul, after she moved into the city by herself. Perhaps for this reason, her early works often feature specific geographical names related to Seoul, such as "ahyeon-dong sandongne" (hilly village in Ahyeong-dong) and "cheongnyangni guldari" (the underpass in Cheongnyangni), suggesting that the root of her poetic sensibility was formed from her memories of wandering without roots.

In addition, the vignettes of the 1970s, illustrated by poetic phrases "bikini otjang" (portable wardrobe), "sundaegukbap" (blood sausage and rice soup), "beongaetan" (starter briquette), "yeontangaseu jungdok" (briquette gas poisoning), and "heonchaekbang" (used bookstore) are considered the reflections of her young adulthood dominated by poverty and extreme loneliness. Such poetic themes, when met with her unique wordplay, create a buoyant vibe. She creates new meanings by replacing the originally associated Chinese characters of Korean words with new characters, for example, using yukgyo (肉交) instead of yukgyo (陸橋) and siksa (食死) instead of siksa (食事), while also slightly modifying the sounds and meanings of words, for instance, using jjagatustra instead of jjaratustra (Zarathustra).

In contrast to her first poetry collection, An's second book, 이별의 재구성 (Reconstructing Separation; 2009), expresses a much broader perspective, even though both collections handle similar subject matters and content. Her wordplay is also featured in the second collection. For instance, she creates poetic tension by placing confusion into meaning when she separates the word "ibyeol" (이별 separation) into two words "i byeol" (이 별 this star) by inserting a space in the middle. Her second collection also includes meta-poems that constantly throw doubts and question the very moment, the very space, and the very act of writing her own poems.

Similarly, in An's third poetry collection, 사랑은 어느날 수리된다 (Love Will Be Repaired Someday; 2014), wordplay is still a dominant feature while its poems revolve around her own experiences based on her love of life and people.

== Poetry collections ==
- 곰곰 (Bear Bear), Random House, 2006. ISBN 9788959861538
- 이별의 재구성 (Reconstructing Separation), Changbi, 2009. ISBN 9788936423063
- 사랑은 어느날 수리된다 (Love Will Be Repaired Someday), Changbi, 2014. ISBN 9788936423742

== Awards ==
- Munhakdongne New Writer Award (2001) for "Gomgom" and four other poems
- Shin Dong-yup Literature Prize (2010) for Ibyeorui jaeguseong
