= Yi Ho-woo =

South Korean poet (1912–1970)

- Born: March 1, 1912
- Died: January 6, 1970 (aged 57)
- Writing career
- Language: Korean
- Period: 1940–1970

Korean name
- Hangul: 이호우
- Hanja: 李鎬雨
- RR: I Hou
- MR: I Hou

Yi Ho-woo (Korean: 이호우; March 1, 1912 – January 6, 1970) was a South Korean poet and journalist.

== Biography ==
Yi Ho-woo was born on March 1, 1912, in Cheongdo, Keishōhoku Province, Korea, Empire of Japan. The name Lee Hou is the poet's pen name, and represented by Chinese characters different from those of his birth name. He graduated from Gyeongseong Je-il High School. Yi attended the Tokyo Arts University. He worked on the editorial and management boards of the Taegu Ilbo, going on to serve as the manatding editor and an editorial writer of the Daegue Maeil Shinmun. Yi debuted as a poet in 1940 when his work Moonlight Night was published in Munjang Magazine.

Yi died on January 6, 1970.

== Work ==
Yi was most famous for his emotional reserve and concern with reality as he wrote about the beauty of simple rural life. As a journalist, he was also aware of the inequities of his time, an awareness that fostered his work, particularly in the difficult times after national liberation and the Korean War.

The Korea Literature Translation Institute, summarizes Yi's work and life:

The life and poetry of Lee Hou is typified by the poet's dogged determination to live, his burning passion, and his strong critical awareness of contemporary realities. Coupled with his modern poetical sensibility toward sijo and its free verse potential, the poet's sijo possessed the power to communicate for and to the people.

In a sijo contest sponsored by the Dong-a Ilbo and judged by poet jurist Lee Byeonggi in 1939, Yi's poems Fallen Leaves" (Nagyeop) and "Azaleas" (Jindalle) were awarded prizes. Yi's formal debut came a year later with the publication of the sijo "Moonlit Night" (Dalbam) in Composition (Munjang) magazine upon the recommendation of Lee Byeonggi. Yi belonged to the Bamboo Shoots (Juksun) and Naggang literary circles and published the sijo collections Collected Sijo Works of Lee Hou (Lee Hou sijojip, 1955) and Dormant Volcano (Hyuhwasan, 1968).

== Works in Korean (Partial) ==
Poetry

- Collected Sijo Works of Lee Hou (1955)
- Dormant Volcano (1968)

== Awards ==
- Gyeongbuk Literary Prize (1955) for "Collected Sijo Works of Lee Howoo"
