= Jang Chealmun =

South Korean writer (born 1966)

- Born: 1966 (age 59–60); Jangsu-gun, South Korea
- Education: Yonsei University
- Writing career
- Language: Korean
- Genre: Poetry

Korean name
- Hangul: 장철문
- RR: Jang Cheolmun
- MR: Chang Ch'ŏlmun

Jang Chealmun (Korean: 장철문; born 1966), is a South Korean poet and writer of children's literature. He was born in Jangsu, North Jeolla Province, and graduated from Yonsei University for Korean Literature, and later from its graduate school. He began his career by publishing "Mareun pulipui norae" (마른 풀잎의 노래 The Song of the Dry Grass) as well as six other poems in the 1994 winter issue of Creation and Criticism. He published four poetry collections. He republished various classic literary works for children, and also published many children's books. He has won the Baeksok Prize for Literature. Currently he is working as a creative writing professor at Sunchon National University.

== Writing ==
Jang Chealmun's poetry uses language that is not provocative, but instead uses a subtle voice to clearly depict things and the world. From when he published his first poetry collection, he was described as contemplating the world in a very mature manner. With rich language, he calmly depicted sights of nature flowing, and people going on about their lives. Such characteristics can be said as having faithfully inherited the characteristics of traditional lyric poetry. Early in his career, his poetry featured average people that lived in the real world. However, his poetry gradually took more influence from Eastern outlook, and Buddhist philosophy. This is probably because of how he practiced Buddhism in Southeast Asia in early 2000s.

Jang Chealmun's third poetry collection, Mureup wiui jajaknamu (무릎 위의 자작나무 The Birch Tree On Top of the Knees), is a collection that most clearly shows Eastern worldview among all of his books. Within everyday life, the poet examines his 'empty mind and body'. Also, through the 'child' and the 'tree', he depicts the circular nature of life and death. From the perspective of the parents, the 'child', while being a biological copy, is an 'another' who is different from them. Moreover, a child is a being that concretely shows the wonder of life. By reflecting on the inner memory of having looked upon the birth of life, the poet explores what life is, and moreover attempts to study what is the secret that the birth of poetry bears. His struggle with what poetry is becomes more intense in his recent poetry collection, Baramui seojjok (바람의 서쪽 West of the Wind). Here, he often features his child. The baby's actions are honest. And the poet himself must have been a child at one time. By examining his own child, the poet reflects on his own days of innocence, and reveals his emotion toward his parents who had cared for him. Through such introspection, the poet became able to write works that are lyrical, but also reveal deep contemplation on literature and life.

== Works ==
In early 2000s, he practiced Buddhism in Southeast Asia, and has depicted that experience in a poetry collection. He has published poetry collections Baramui seojjok (바람의 서쪽 West of the Wind; 1998), Sanbeotnamu-ui jeonyeok (산벚나무의 저녁 The Evening of the Wild Cherry Tree; 2003), Mureup wiui jajaknamu (무릎 위의 자작나무 The Birch Tree On Top of the Knees; 2008), and Biyu-ui bakkat (비유의 바깥 The Metaphor's Outside) (Munhakdongne); as well as children's books Noru samchon (노루 삼촌 Deer Uncle; 2002), Nappeunnyeoseok (나쁜녀석 The Bad Guy; 2003), Huin jwi i-yagi (흰 쥐 이야기 The Story of a White Mouse; 2006), Jinri-ui kkotdabal beobguyeong (진리의 꽃다발 법구경; 2006), Choego-unjeon (최고운전 Best Driving; 2006), Choecheokjeon (최척전; 2008) and Bok tareo gan chonggak (복 타러 간 총각 A Man Who Went To Be Lucky; 2013). Currently he is working as a creative writing professor at Sunchon National University. He won the Baeksok Prize for Literature in 2016. He is participating in the 2017 Seoul International Forum for Literature.

=== Poetry collections ===
- Baramui seojjok (바람의 서쪽 West of the Wind), Changbi, 1998.
- Sanbeotnamu-ui jeonyeok (산벚나무의 저녁 The Evening of the Wild Cherry Tree), Changbi, 2003.
- Mureup wiui jajaknamu (무릎 위의 자작나무 The Birch Tree On Top of the Knees), Changbi, 2008.
- Biyu-ui bakkat (비유의 바깥 The Metaphor's Outside), Munhakdongne, 2016.

=== Children's books ===
- Noru samchon (노루 삼촌 Deer Uncle), Changbi, 2002
- Nappeunnyeoseok (나쁜녀석 The Bad Guy), 2003
- Huin jwi i-yagi (흰 쥐 이야기 The Story of a White Mouse; 2006)
- Jinri-ui kkotdabal beobguyeong (진리의 꽃다발 법구경; 2006)
- Choego-unjeon (최고운전 Best Driving; 2006)
- Choecheokjeon (최척전; 2008)
- Bok tareo gan chonggak (복 타러 간 총각 A Man Who Went To Be Lucky; 2013)

== Awards ==
- 2016, Baeksok Prize for Literature
