= Kim Nyeon-gyun =

Korean poet (b. 1942)

- 김년균
- Born: 1942 (age 83–84)

Korean name
- Hangul: 김년균
- RR: Gim Nyeongyun
- MR: Kim Nyŏn'gyun

Kim Nyeon-gyun (Korean: 김년균; born 1942) is a South Korean poet. Since his debut in 1972, he has been active as a poet, writer, and essayist. He has also served various Korean literary organizations, such as being a board member of the Korean Centre of PEN International and the board director of the Korean Writers' Association. Kim's poetry depicts lives of pain and suffering on the surface, but paints the joy and beauty of life through the desire for resurrection and renewal on the inside.

== Life ==
Kim was born on 29 January 1942. He was influenced by his older sister who loved to read. He asked a printing office to publish a volume of his poetry in high school. In his last year of high school, he stayed at a hermitage on the mountain Jirisan and wrote over 1,000 pages of a novel in 16 days. He then enlisted in the army for the mandatory military service, where he met a superior officer who wrote film scripts and began to write and read in earnest. That led him to enroll in the Department of Creative Writing at Seorabeol Art College where focused on literature under the guidance of writer Kim Tong-ni. In 1970, he began working for the Korean Writers' Association as an editor for Monthly Literature Magazine and made his debut in 1972 with the publication of his poems "Chulhang" (출항 Sailing) and "Jageop" (작업 Work) and his essay "Han" (한(限) Grudge).

After his debut, he became active as a poet, publishing his first two poetry collections: Jangma (장마 Rainy Season) (1973) and Galmaegi (갈매기 Seagulls) (1977). He published poems that explored the meaning of human existence and the appearance of life, mainly under the theme of "people." The "people" series began immediately after the assassination of Park Chung Hee on October 26, 1979. He explained that he "published a poem in a newspaper out of concern for life in a world in upheaval, and that happened to be 'saram' (사람 People)." Since then, he wrote over 400 poems about "people" for 30 years. Some of the "people" poems were published in Aieseo eoreunkkaji (아이에서 어른까지 From a Child to an Adult) (1997) and Saramui maeul (사람의 마을 Village of People) (1997), and these two collections earned him the Modern Korean Poet Award (한국현대시인상) in 1997.

A key theme in Kim's creative work is Christianity. Wanting to write poetry praising God as David had done, Kim wrote numerous religious poems, including Naneun yesuga jotta (나는 예수가 좋다 I Love Jesus) (2001) and Oraedoen seupgwan (오래된 습관 An Old Habit) (2003). For this, he received the 2001 grand prize at the Deulsori Literary Award (들소리문학상), founded by Deulsori Shinmun (들소리 신문), a weekly Christian newspaper.

== Writing ==
To Kim, literature stems from questions about the existence of humans, before it is a description of the spirit of the times or social phenomena. His first poetry collection, Jangma (장마) (1973), focuses on isolation and death as the origin that cannot be discovered in our everyday life, and captures his poetic will and expresses the fate of humans who cannot be separated from death. His second poetry collection, Galmaegi (갈매기) (1977), also expresses his awareness of and confirmation of humans who are full of sorrow. In his poems, people are depicted as beings who are beautiful because they have underlying sorrow, grief, despair, and death.

As this shows, the biggest theme of Kim's poetry is people. Most of his poetry collections consist of poems subtitled "People." Kim's oldest literary friend, novelist Lee Mun-gu (이문구), stated, "[Kim's] long-explored theme is about people who are amazingly human in a way but are also amazingly non-human in a way… He recites about 'people' again today."

In 2009, he published the poetry collection Sukmyeong (숙명 Fate), consisting of over 90 poems subtitled "People," and explained the reason he only writes about "people" and his thoughts on writing about people. He said that there were a lot of things to write about people, so he wrote general stories about people and specific people as well. He explained that the "people" series was a long process of reaching enlightenment about people through poetry and emphasized that he cannot give up on writing about people and therefore must write about people. Perhaps that is why his latest poetry collection Sarameul saengakhamyeo (사람을 생각하며 Thinking of People) (2015) is also full of poems that make us think about "what humans really are."

== Works ==
=== Poetry collections ===
- 《장마》, 한국문학사, 1974 / Jangma (Rainy Season), Hanguk Munhak, 1974.
- 《갈매기》, 한일출판사, 1977 / Galmaegi (Seagulls), Hanil Chulpansa, 1977.
- 《바다와 아이들》, 우석출판사, 1979 / Badawa aideul (Ocean and the Children), Useok Chulpansa, 1979.
- 《사람》, 대영사, 1984 / Saram (People), Daeyeongsa, 1984.
- 《풀잎은 자라나라》, 지학사, 1986 / Pulipeun jaranara (Grass Should Grow), Jihak, 1986.
- 《사람의 마을》, 혜진서관, 1997 / Saramui maeul (Village of People), Hyejinseogwan, 1997.
- 《아이에서 어른까지》, 혜진서관, 1997 / Aieseo eoreunkkaji (From a Child to an Adult), Heyjinseogwan, 1997.
- 《하루》, 다윗마을, 2001 / Haru (One Day), Dawitmaeul, 2001.
- 《나는 예수가 좋다》, 다윗마을, 2001 / Naneun yesuga jotta (I Love Jesus), Dawitmaeul, 2001.
- 《오래된 습관》, 다윗마을, 2003 / Oraedoen seupgwan (An Old Habit), Dawitmaeul, 2003.
- 《그리운 사람》, 계간문예, 2007 / Geuriun saram (The Person I Long For), Gyegan Munye, 2007.
- 《숙명》, 문학사계사, 2009 / Sukmyeong (Fate), Munhak Sagyesa, 2009.
- 《자연을 생각하며》, 책만드는집, 2012 / Jayeoneul saenggakhamyeo (Thinking of Nature), Chaekmandeuneunjip, 2012.
- 《무슨 꽃을 피우는가》, 문학사계, 2013 / Museun kkocheul piuneunga (What Kind of Flower is Blooming?), Munhak Sagye, 2013.
- 《우리들이 사는 법》, 문학사계, 2013 / Urideuri saneun beop (The Way We Live), Munhak Sagye, 2013.
- 《사람을 생각하며》, 계간문예, 2015 / Sarameul saenggakhamyeo (Thinking of People), Gyegan Munye, 2015.
- 《사랑을 말하다》, 계간문예, 2015 / Sarangeul marhada (Talking About Love), Gyegan Munye, 2015.

=== Essay collections ===
- 《날으는 것이 나는 두렵다》, 친우, 1990 / Nareuneun geosi naneun duryeopda (I Am Afraid of Flying), Chinu, 1990.
- 《사람에 관한 명상》, 세훈, 1996 / Sarame gwanhan myeongsang (A Meditation on People), Sehun, 1996.

== Awards ==
- Seorabeol Literature Prize (for "Donghaeng") (1967)
- 20th Modern Korean Poet Award (한국현대시인상) (for Aieseo eoreunkkaji and Saramgwa maeul) (1997)
- 1st Deulsori Shinmun Deulsori Literature Award, Grand Prize (for Naneun yesuga jotta) (2001)
- 19th Federation of Artistic and Cultural Organization of Korea's Arts and Culture Award (2005)
- 2nd Yun Byeong-ro Literary Award (윤병로문학상) (2008)
- 29th Yun Dongju Literature Award (for Thinking of Nature) (2013)

== See also ==
Jeong, Daeseop, "[Monday's Guest] Kim Nyeon-gyun, 24th Board Director of the WKorean Writers' Association, Jeonbuk Ilbo, January 29, 2007. http://www.jjan.kr/news/articleView.html?idxno=214128
