= Lee Jenny =

South Korean poet (born 1972)

Lee Jenny (born 1972) is a South Korean poet. She was born in Busan. She began her literary career by publishing Peru in 2008 through the Kyunghyang Daily News New Writer's Award. She has published two poetry collections, and has won the Pyeon-un Literature Award in 2011 as well as the Kim Hyeon Prize in 2016. Jo Jaeryong, a literary critic, has praised her as a 'master of rhythm that is bringing us to the frontlines of poetry'.

== Life ==
Lee Jenny dreamed of becoming a writer since the 4th grade. She was admitted to Kyungnam University, and since she was 22 she submitted her works to new writers contests for fiction, but was rejected a number of times. She would find a job when she ran out of money, and once she had enough saved, she would quit and focus on writing. This continued until in 2008, she won the Kyunghyang Daily News New Writer's Award for her collection of poetry. After her debut, she received the attention of the literary community for her unique style of writing. She has not published a novel yet, but Lee Jenny is still currently writing a novel along with poetry, and has expressed that she would like to publish a novel when the opportunity arises. In 2010 she published Amado Africa (아마도 아프리카 Maybe Africa), and in 2014 she published Waenyahamyeon urineun urireul moreugo (왜냐하면 우리는 우리를 모르고 Because we don't know ourselves). She was awarded the Pyeon-un Literature Award in 2011, and won the Kimhyeon Munhakpae in 2016. She is a member of the experimental text collective 'Ru'.

== Writing ==
Early on, literary critics expressed the Lee Jenny's poetry do 'wordplay' by laying out similar words. Her poetry often features children that enjoy playing with meaningless symbols. In Korea, not only is Lee Jenny acknowledged for her ability to make unique rhythms through repetition, but is also praised as a skilled poet who can "make poems by deferring meaning itself."

== Works ==
- Amado Africa (아마도 아프리카 Maybe Africa), Changbi, 2010.
- Waenyahamyeon urineun urireul moreugo (왜냐하면 우리는 우리를 모르고 Because we don't know ourselves), Moonji Publishing, 2014.

== Awards ==
- 2011 Pyeon-un Literature Award
- 2016 Kim Hyeon Prize
