= Shin Yong-mok =

South Korean poet (born 1974)

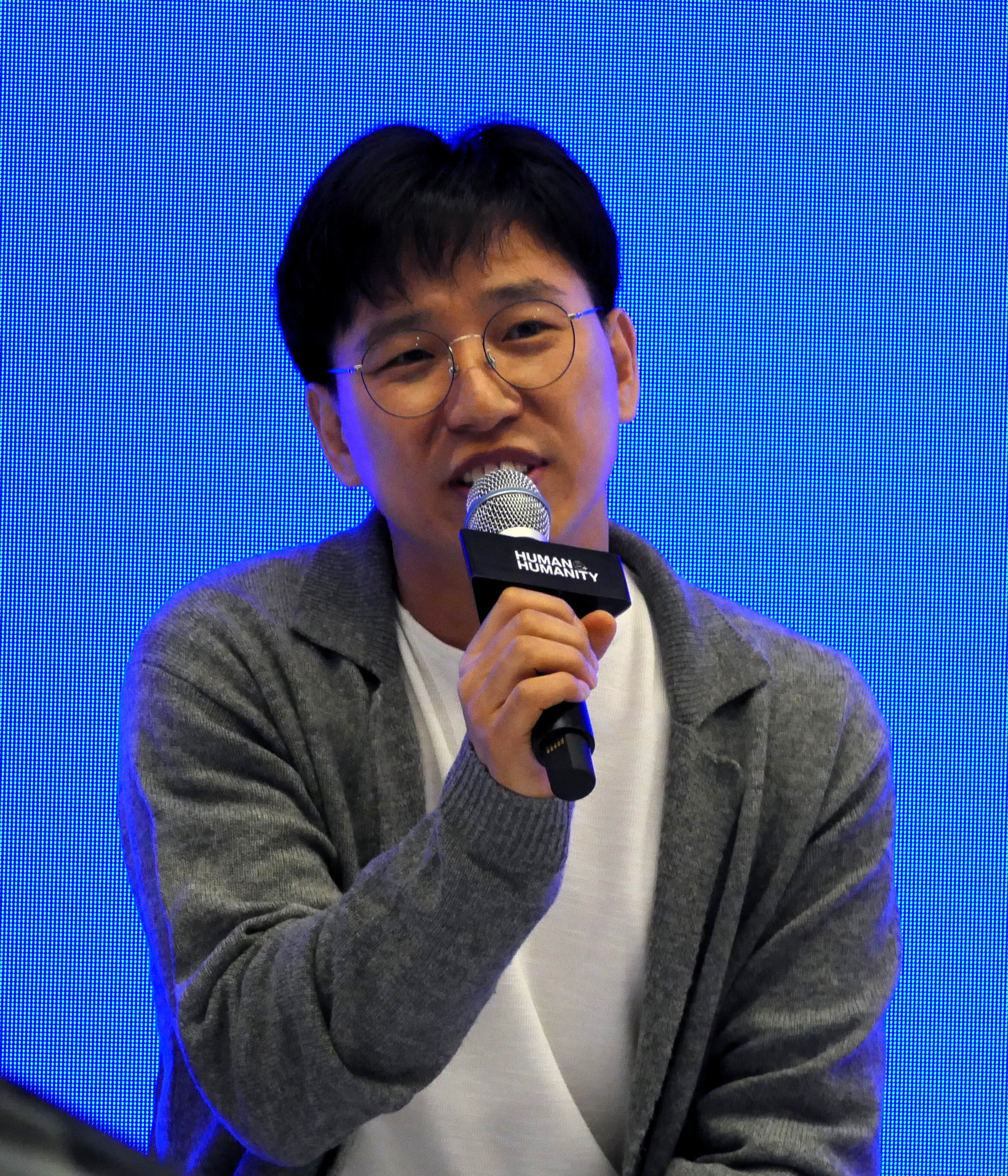
- Born: 1974 (age 51–52)
- Writing career
- Language: Korean

Korean name
- Hangul: 신용목
- RR: Sin Yongmok
- MR: Sin Yongmok

Shin Yong-mok (Korean: 신용목; born 1974) is a South Korean poet.

== Life ==
Shin Yong-mok was born in Geochang, Gyeongsangnam-do, Korea in 1974. Shin entered college by which time he was already writing poetry. He was elected student body president and immediately attacked his university for corruption. He also undertook a fast in protest for democratization of educational institutions. Shin made his literary debut in the year 2000.

== Work ==
Shin was influenced by older-generation activist poets, so-called "poets of the masses" (minjung shiin), such as Kim Nam-ju and Shin Kyeong-nim, and genuinely anguished over the problem of the path literature should take in society and history.

The quintessential "new poet", Shin's poems avoid overt ideology. Shin's clearly spells out messages of love for the community in soft, easy lyricism, and this is based in his own firm belief in the value of "co-existence with one's fellow man" over "self-happiness." . Even amid the wave of neoliberalism in which competition among writers is considered a necessary evil, Shin sees meaning in even the smallest of hopes, in order to protect the dignity and liberty of the human being. As in the lines "Every hour given me / I take my flashlight and go check the reins / to see if there is any damage" (selected passage from "Jeong of the Guard"), he places himself in the position of a "guard" responsible for "positivity". Shin's work argues that the value and importance of the spirit will never fade, even in the materialism of capitalist society.

Shin has won multiple awards, including Newcomers Literary Prize in 2000, the Beginning Literary Prize in 2008, and the 육사시문학상 젊은시인상 prize, also in 2008.

== Works in Korean (Partial) ==
Poetry Collections

- We Must Walk All of the Wind (Geu balameul da geoleoya handa, Munhakgwa jiseongsa, 2004)
- The Wind's Millionth Molar (Balam ui baekmanjjae eogeumni, Changbi, 2007)

== Awards ==
- Newcomers Literary Prize (2000)
- Beginning Literary Prize (2008)
- 육사시문학상 젊은시인상 prize (2008)
