= Yi Geun-hwa =

South Korean poet and academic (born 1976)

- Born: 1976 (age 49–50)
- Writing career
- Language: Korean

Korean name
- Hangul: 이근화
- RR: I Geunhwa
- MR: I Kŭnhwa

Yi Geun-hwa (Korean: 이근화; born 1976) is a South Korean modern poet and professor.

== Life ==
Yi Geun-hwa was born in 1976 in Seoul, Korea. Having received her PhD after researching "colonial period Korean appearing in 1930s poetry", Yi currently lectures while continuing her creative writing activities.

== Work ==
Yi Geun-hwa published her first poems in the review Hyeondae Munhak in 2004.

Yi's poems apply a light tone to show small yet interesting landscapes from life, give us a feeling of intimacy at first; but after a moment that feeling becomes more complex, and then often changes to perplexity. Expressions such as "A blue-bellied fish lies flush with the rope, staring at one place, that place where the clouds roll by, a girl lives together with a boy, and they go to market together // a fly is jumping rope with the usual gestures, therefore at zero-six fifty minutes, they turn at the market corner and at the second house buy a mackerel" (selected passage from "Mackerel"), or lines like "This is my body/ a king jar/ I have no arms or legs/ once I am cut/ I will bare my neck/ but the rumored jar/ resembles the story/ and the story's stomach is full" (selected passage from "King Jar") presents scenes that are familiar to us but which, filtered through the poet's voice, become hard, unfamiliar landscapes.

Some readers and critics have expressed regret or criticism, mentioning the "difficulty" and the "incommunicability" of her poems. But in an interview with the press, the poet has stated, "I do think that poetic language must be communicative in some way, but who is to say that communicativeness must be limited to one or two ways? ... I think "difficult poems demand new ways of communicating". In this way, through incommunicability, the poet speaks to the world in a paradoxical way that shows a yearning for true communication.

Yi has received the Yun Dong-ju young writers’ award (2009), the Kim Jun-seong literary award (2010), as well as the Siwa Segye award (2011) and the Hyeondae literary award (2013).

== Works in Korean ==
- Kant's Zoo (Kanteu ui dongmulweon, Mineumsa, 2006)
- Our Evolution (Uri deul ui jinhwa, Munhakgwa jiseongsa, 2009)
