= Kim Sin-yong =

South Korean writer (1945–2026)

- Born: April 1, 1945; Busan, Chosen
- Died: January 15, 2026 (aged 80); Chungju, South Korea
- Occupation: Writer
- Writing career
- Language: Korean

Korean name
- Hangul: 김신용
- Hanja: 金信龍
- RR: Gim Sinyong
- MR: Kim Sinyong

Kim Sin-yong (Korean: 김신용; April 1, 1945 – January 15, 2026) was a South Korean writer.

== Background ==
Kim Sin-yong was born on April 1, 1945 in Busan, Korea. Kim's early life was difficult as he was exposed to poverty, separation and death. His father died when Kim was fourteen and his stepmother, older, brother, and sister abandoned him. With his three half-sisters, Kim was forced onto the streets. In his work Cast-Away Lives (1988), he describes his hand-to-mouth existence as an A-frame carrier, bicycle car driver, movie extra, and worker in a town being demolished for urban renewal. He also sold his blood for money, and engaged in petty thievery, which resulted in his working as a laborer in a prison gang. Imprisonment, at age 16, came to Kim as a relief from the hardships of the outside world, as in prison he was fed, clothed, and allowed to read. In fact, Kim called prison “my classroom, my workroom.”

Kim died in Chungju, South Korea on January 15, 2026, at the age of 80.

== Work ==
Kim's poems record what life is like at the bottom of the social heap. But his poems contain nothing of the all-consuming rage at society or hostile enmity that one might expect from a poet with his background. Kim does not place blame for his life on capitalist society, its oppression of workers, or the contradictions in the social structure. His labor poetry does not possess an organizational or ideological character. Instead, it casts a sympathetic gaze on the difficult lives of those who have dropped to the lowest place in society, and embraces them warmly. These labor poems have little in common with antagonistic strikers on the picket line. Rather, they exist as small voices offering up consolation in whispered tones that reflect the experiences of the workers themselves. Even though his poetic subjects live in a world of poverty, neglect and lack of compassion, the poems hold out hope that love—in the truest sense of the word—can help these individuals form a community that belongs to them alone. As one critic summarized his work, he "continues to feel imaginary pains even after the disappearance of a painful life but endures them with aesthetic sorrow."

Kim won three literary awards in his career, the Cheon Sang-byeong Poetry Prize in 2005, and the Sowol Prize of Excellence and Long-Term Literature Prize (노작문학상) in 2006.

== Works in Korean (partial) ==
- Cast-away Lives (1988)

== Awards ==
- Cheon Sang-byeong Poetry Prize (2005)
- The Sowol Prize of Excellence (2006)
- Long-Term Literature Prize (노작문학상, 2006)
