= Yi Sang-hwa =

Korean poet (1901–1943)

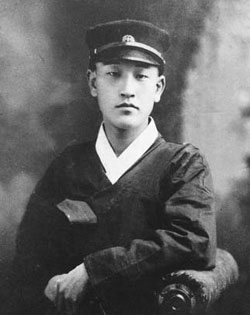
- Korean nationalist poet
- Born: April 5, 1901
- Died: April 25, 1943 (aged 42)
- Writing career
- Language: Korean

Korean name
- Hangul: 이상화
- Hanja: 李相和
- RR: I Sanghwa
- MR: I Sanghwa

Yi Sang-hwa (Korean: 이상화; also Lee Sang-hwa; 1901–1943) was a Korean nationalist poet active in the resistance to Japanese rule.

== Biography ==
Yi Sang-hwa, who sometimes published under the names Muryang, Sanghwa, and Baega, was born April 5, 1901, in Daegu, Joseon. He graduated from Jungdong High School in Seoul. He then went to Japan, where he studied French literature. In 1923, he returned to Korea and taught English and French in a Daegu high school. According to Choe Chong-dae, "His reputation grew as a young promising poet after composing the poem entitled 'Does spring come to these stripped lands?' in 1926, which was published in the 70th edition Magazine of Kaebyuk, the contents of which led to the magazine being suspended by the authorities. Yi worked as a teacher for the Kyonam School (now the Daeryun Junior High School) and as a Director of the Daegu Choson Ilbo.

Yi participated in the March 1st Movement of March 1, 1919 in Daegu, which sought to restore Korean sovereignty. In 1921, wishing to study in France, Yi went to Japan to study French language and literature, but ended up returning to Korea in 1923 after the Great Kanto earthquake. In the early twenties, he joined the White Tide (Baekjo) circle along with Hong Sayong, Park Jonghwa, Park Yeonghui, Kim Gijin, and others, and began his career in poetry with the publication of the poems "Joy of the Corrupt Age" (Malseui huitan), "Double Death" (Ijungui samang), and "Toward my bedchamber" (Naui chimsillo) in the journal Torch (Geohwa).

The poet went on to create the literature study group PASKYULA with Kim Gijin and others, and in August 1925 he helped the Korea Artists Proletariat Federation (KAPF; Joseon Peurolletaria Yesulga Dongmaeng). The next year, he became managing editor of the KAPF journal Literary Arts Movement. In 1937 he went to Mangyeong to see his elder brother, General Lee Sangjeong, but was arrested by the Japanese upon his return to Korea and jailed for four months. After his release, he taught at the Gyonam School in Daegu for a time before devoting himself to reading and study in order to produce an English translation of The tale of Chunhyang (Chunhyangjeon).

Yi died of cancer on April 25, 1943.

== Work ==
The Korean Literature Translation Institute summarizes Yi's contributions to poetry as:

Lee Sanghwa's poetic verse may well be an example of one of the most distinct departures in style in all of Korean literature. As a member of the White Tide (Baekjo) literary circle, made up of a school of romanticists, Lee's early poems involved heavy elements of prose and depicted a world of decadent sensibilities and narcissism. In his debut poem, "To My Bedcham er"(Naui chimsillo), for example, the poet contemplates committing suicide in order to attain true love, and in another, a life of reverie, completely cut off from reality, is presented as the most desirable goal possible.

In 1925, however, prompted by the growing concern that was the reality of Japanese imperialism in Korea, Lee made a sudden and decisive break with this poetic world. Assuming the identity of a nationalist poet, Lee began to write poems of defiance and resistance against colonial rule. Because the restrictions of The Times were such that he felt himself unable to express his political frustrations directly, his views tend to manifest themselves in nature symbols such as expressions of the homeland's natural beauty and depiction of the plight of individuals, such as Korean immigrants to Manchuria, deprived of everything by their oppressors. The series of poems from this late period that include "Does Spring Come to These Stolen Fields?" (Ppaeatgin deuredo bomeun oneunga?), for example, reveal Lee's spirit of resistance in just this way.

Does spring come to this land no more our own,
to these forfeited fields?
Bathed in the sun I go as if in a dream along a lane
that cuts across paddy-fields like parted hair
to where the blue sky and the green field meet.
You mute heaven and silent fields,
I do not feel I have come here on my own;
tell me if I am driven by you or by some hidden force.

....What am I looking for? Soul,
my blind soul, endlessly darting
like children at play by the river,
answer me: where am I going?
Filled with the odor of grass, compounded
of green laughter and green sorrow,
limping along, I walk all day, as if possessed
by the spring devil:
for these are stolen fields, and our spring is stolen.

== Legacy ==
A monument was erected in memory of the poet in Daegu's Dalseong Park in 1948 and his collected poems were published in 1951. Yi's neglected house was restored and opened in 2005, with memorabilia pertaining to the poet and the resistance.
