= Lee Jangwook =

South Korean poet, novelist, and critic (born 1968)

- Born: 1968 (age 57–58)
- Writing career
- Language: Korean

Korean name
- Hangul: 이장욱
- RR: I Janguk
- MR: I Changuk

Lee Jangwook (Korean: 이장욱) is a South Korean poet, novelist, and critic.

== Life ==
Born in Seoul, Korea in 1968, Lee Jangwook majored in Russian literature the undergraduate and graduate school levels at Korea University. He has worked as an editor and also as a Professor of Creative Writing at Chosun University in Gwangju Korea. Lee began his writing career in earnest in 1994 with a series of poems being published as winners of the new writer's award in the poetry division of the literary journal Contemporary Literature.

== Work ==
The Korea Literature Translation Institute summarizes Lee's work:

His poetry is distinguished by his ability to effortlessly weave together concreteness and abstractness. Indeed, as one critic has pointed out, "the individual words he chooses are clear and concrete, but the sentences in which those words are brought together and the way in which the sentences are combined has a dreamlike quality."
In addition to poetry, Lee is also pursuing a career as a novelist, following the publication of his award-winning novel, Cheerful Devils of Callot, in 2005 It won the Moonhak Soonchup Award

Moreover, he is active in other diverse roles, including holding a permanent post on the editorial committee of a leading literary magazine, which is unprecedented at his age, and as a well-known literary critic in his own right, having published incisive analyses of the esoteric works of his contemporaries, including Hwang Byeongseung, Kim Haengsuk, and Kim Minjeong.

The incomparably wide scope of this "all-around writer" is rooted in his innate sense of integrity and diligence. These aspects of his personality are sublimated into his writing through his keep powers of observation. He captures the secrets of life that are hidden inside trivial everyday details with a visionary tone and careful observation.
Describing the difference between the literary genres of poetry and fiction, Lee explains that, for him, poetry feels more akin to night while fiction feels more akin to day. However, this does not mean that he remains stuck in the dichotomized world described as "night and day" by the literary establishment. Rather, he focuses on the secret places that exist between the polar opposites of "outer layer" and "inner depths," "reality" and "fantasy," "conscious" and "unconscious," as if on the dusky borderline between night and day.

Lee has published two collections of poetry in Korea, Sand Mountain in My Sleep and Hopeful Songs at Noon (2006). He is also a novelist, having written, Cheerful Devils of Callot. In addition to strictly literary works, he has written two collections of literary criticism, My Gloomy Modern Boy (2005) and Revolution and Modernism: Russian Poetry and Its Aesthetics (2005).

Currently, he is an active member of the poetry group Cheonmong ("Heavenly Dream").

Lee was a resident at the University of Iowa International Writing Program in 2008, which he participated in as a courtesy of the Korea Literature Translation Institute. At that residency Lee spoke about traveling to Russia, "Fourteen years ago, in the winter of 1994, I embarked on a long journey from St. Petersburg to Chuvashia with Andrei, who was my roommate at the time," and expressed his own view of the role of literature's role in society:

But generally speaking, the important thing is not to select just one out of the many changes .... The important thing, probably, is not defining just one change, but thinking about dynamic and chaotic relationships among these various changes. The important thing is not to think but to act for something better.

== Works in English ==
- 'Old Man River' (Seoul : Asia Publishers, 2015)
- 'Request Line at Noon' (New York : Codhill Press, 2016)

== Works in Korean (Partial) ==
Poetry Collections

- Sand Mountain in My Sleep (2002)
- Request Line at Noon (2006)
- Birth Year, Month, and Date (2011)
- It's Possible, Because It's not Eternal (2016)

Novels

- Delightful Devils of Callot (2005)
- Stranger than Paradise (2013)

Collections of Short Stories

- Emperor of Confession (2010)
- Everything But a Giraffe (2015)

Criticism

- My Gloomy Modern Boy (2005)
- Revolution and Modernism: Russian Poetry and Its Aesthetics (2005)

== Awards ==
- 2013 제4회 문학동네 젊은작가상
- 2011 제1회 웹진문지문학상
- 2010 제1회 문학동네 젊은작가상 우수상
- 2005 제3회 문학수첩 작가상
- 2003 제8회 현대시학 작품상
- 1994 현대문학 시 부문 신인상
