= Mun Tae-jun =

South Korean poet (born 1970)

- Born: 1970 (age 55–56); Gimcheon, South Korea
- Education: Korea University
- Occupations: Writer, poet
- Writing career
- Language: Korean

Korean name
- Hangul: 문태준
- Hanja: 文太俊
- RR: Mun Taejun
- MR: Mun T'aejun

Mun Tae-jun (Korean: 문태준, born 1970) is a South Korean poet.

== Career ==
Mun Tae-jun has published several poetry collections since his prize-winning debut in 1994, and the great artistic potential of his works have gained the attention of many literary artists and critics.

Mun Tae-jun's poems employ a comforting language to soothe the wounds of the soul. His poems seek to assuage the pains of those suffering from the violence and oppression of a heartless society. He values "conversation" highly, emphasizing full empathy between two existences, such as when he says, "That over there, is in me here; and I here, am in that over there. Let me respect that which is not me, and therefore those things that are me." The poet aspires to a state in which the subject and object are not distinct form one another, but fused together. In this respect, Mun Tae-jun carries on the traditional lyrical tradition. His poetry collection The Development of Dusk (2008) was translated to English by Kim Won-Chung and Christopher Merrill and published as The Growth of a Shadow (2012). A handful of his other works have also been translated.

== Selected works ==
=== Works in translation ===
- The Growth of a Shadow: Selected Poems of Taejoon Moon (2012) - translated by Kim Won-Chung and Christopher Merrill ISBN 9780982746639

=== Works in Korean (partial) ===
==== Poetry collections ====
- Crowded Backyard (수런거리는 뒤란, 2000) ISBN 978-8-936-42196-0
- Bare Feet (맨발, 2004) ISBN 978-8-936-42238-7
- Flatfish (가재미, 2006) ISBN 978-8-932-01713-6
- The Development of Dusk (그늘의 발달, 2008) ISBN 978-8-932-01881-2
- A Distant Place (먼 곳, 2012) ISBN 978-8-936-42343-8
- Our Final Face (우리들의 마지막 얼굴, 2015) ISBN 978-8-936-42387-2
- What Is the End of What I Long For? (내가 사모하는 일에 무슨 끝이 있나요, 2018) ISBN 978-8-954-65017-5

==== Prose collections ====
- Embrace: Holding You, I Am Stained (포옹 - 당신을 안고 내가 물든다, 2007)

== Awards ==
- Dongseo Literary Prize (2004)
- Nojak Literary Prize (2004)
- Midang Literary Award (2005) - for "누가 울고 간다"
- Yushim Literary Prize (2006)
- Sowol Poetry Prize (2006) - for "그맘때에는"
