= Heo Su-gyeong =

Korean poet (1964–2018)

- Born: 1964
- Died: October 3, 2018 (aged 54)
- Citizenship: South Korean
- Education: Gyeongsang National University, University of Münster
- Occupation: Poet
- Writing career
- Language: Korean

- Korean name
- Hangul: 허수경
- Hanja: 許秀卿
- RR: Heo Sugyeong
- MR: Hŏ Sugyŏng

Heo Su-gyeong (Korean: 허수경; 1964 – 3 October 2018) was a South Korean poet.

== Life ==
Heo Su-gyeong was born in 1964 in Jinju, South Korea. She majored in Korean literature in Gyeongsang National University. Heo made her literary debut at the age of twenty-three in 1987 at the magazine Practical Literature with her poetry, and published her first volume of poetry There's Not A Fodder Like Sorrow (슬픔만한 거름이 어디 있으랴). In 1992, She published her second volume of poetry Alone To A Distant House (혼자 가는 먼 집). After she published these two volumes of poetry and became a star of the korean poetry scene, She left Korea abruptly to Germany. While in Germany, she pursued a doctorate degree in Ancient Near East archaeology in the Department of Ancient Oriental Studies at University of Münster. In 2003 she married Reinhard Dittmann, a german archaeologist of the Near East.

== Work ==
The Digital library of Korean literature comments on her work that "She infuses her poetry with the lyricism and the images taken from traditional Korean folktales and songs, thereby creating a uniquely Korean modern poetry free of western modernist influence. It can be said that distancing herself from her native tongue by living in a foreign environment is in itself the poet's attempt to bring herself closer to the essence of the Korean language". In Heo's poems, life is broken into pieces, filled with agony, incoherent, and loveless. Literary critic Lee Kwang ho noted the difference in the style of her post german migration work and her previous works saying while her pre germany works can be characterized as "a love poem combined with the rhythm and sensibilities of the South Gyeongsang Province and the loneliness and sadness that she faced as a woman", her work while in germany showed "her musings of lengthy periods that reflects her archaeological background".

== Works in Korean (partial) ==
- There's Not A Fodder Like Sorrow (Seulpeummanhan georeumi oedi iteurya, 1988)
- Alone To A Distant House (Honja ganeun meon jip, 1992)
- Though My Soul is Old (Nae yeonghoneun orae doieoteuna, 2001).

== Death ==
The poet died of terminal stomach cancer on October 3, 2018. The burial was held in a tree burial (Baumbestattung) fashion.
