= Kim Youngtae =

South Korean poet (1936–2007)

- 김영태
- Born: November 22, 1936
- Died: July 12, 2007 (aged 70)

Kim Youngtae (Korean: 김영태; November 22, 1936 – July 12, 2007) was a South Korean poet. After his debut in 1959, he continuously wrote modernist poetry that expressed diverse artistic experiences through the use of sensual language.

== Life ==
Kim was born in 1936 in Seoul, South Korea. He majored in Western painting in college. As an artist that began with literature and soon expanded in multiple directions to work in dance, art, theatre, and music. Apart from working as a poet, dance critic, and painter, Kim Youngtae also actively worked as a music and theatre critic. He first began his career as a critic as a music critic. He was enormously interested in classical music and had a collection of over 1,400 LPs. In 1967, he established a music fan club organization and actively participated in addition to writing his own collection of music criticism. In 1966, he participated in the Jayu geukjang (Freedom Theatre) collective and was active as a theatre critic for around ten years. he was an incredibly prolific writer that left around 60 works related to art. Kim Youngtae is famous for his diverse writings, covering poetry, dance criticism, and Western painting. A surprising point is that much of his writing was done as he was simultaneously working at the Korea Exchange Bank from 1968 to 1992. He noted that his work performance was not very good as he would leave work early at 5:30PM to attend performances at dance theatres while his colleagues worked overtime or accumulate his vacation time to spend 20 days overseas watching performances.

In 2005, he was diagnosed with renal cancer and died in 2007.

=== Poet ===
Since his student days, Kim dreamed of being a poet and wrote poetry. Kim himself also considered his main profession to be that of a poet. In 1959, on the recommendation of poet Park Nam-su, he made his debut in the literary magazine Sasanggye with the poem "Siryeonui sagwanamu" (시련의 사과나무 The Apple Trees of Hardship) and three other poems. Kim Youngtae, along with poets Lee Seunghoon and Lee Su-ik, was considered part of the "Contemporary Poetry coterie. The Contemporary Poetry Coterie was established in June 1961 and published 26 magazine issues of their group's works until 1972—the longest-active coterie in Korea. With Issue 6 in 1964, older members were replaced with newer poets and Kim Youngtae was one of them. Through this coterie, Kim Youngtae, Lee Seunghoon, Lee Su-ik, and other unique poets that appeared through this coterie magazine later became the cornerstone of 1980s Korean modernism poetry. Poets affiliated with avant-gardism and modernism participated in this "Contemporary Poetry" coterie, and their poetry was generally characterized by modern people's exploration of interiority, experimental language, and pursuit of fantasy. Kim Youngtae's poetry has been reviewed as an exploration of love's ambivalence through the relationship between the self and the Other. His poetry has also frequently inspired other works of art. For instance, he has written over 30 works on dance that have used his poetry as their foundation. His poem, "Meolli inneun mudeom" (멀리 있는 무덤 Faraway Tomb), was written in memorial of Kim Soo-young, a South Korean poet that greatly influenced Kim Youngtae in his youth, and was later made into a dance performance and play.

=== Dance critic ===
When Kim was a middle school student, he saw a photobook on ballet and became enchanted with dance. Beginning in 1969, he began officially writing dance criticism. At the time, dance criticism generally existed only as translations of foreign writings, and Kim Youngtae's dance criticisms received highly favorable reviews because he was one of the first people in Korea to personally attend performances and write extensively on them. He has contributed to the popularization of contemporary dance genres and has been noted as an "on-site dance critic" for his impressionist criticism rendered through detailed descriptions and poetic writing style. He watched performances and wrote reviews for over thirty years, to the extent that the Grand Theatre at the Daehangno Art and Culture Center, where he was a frequent patron, left seat ga-123 (later seat ga-L10) empty for him as a permanently designated seat. After he died, the theatre also held commemorative performances for him every season.

=== Artist ===
In line with his college major, Kim frequently held private exhibitions of his own drawings, which centered around the subjects of dance and music. Beginning in 1977, he (along with novelist Lee Ze-ha) also began drawing caricatures of poets for the covers of Moonji Publisher's line of poetry books. His drawings are characterized by rough and coarse lines that seem on the verge of crumbling. His personal typeface—chogaenurinche (초개눌인체)— is also similar to his drawing style, distinguished by how it seems to easily flow with unique arches.

== Writing ==
With Kim's unique aesthetic sense and sensual language, his poetry tends to be somewhat abstruse and difficult. His poetry has been reviewed as demonstrating aspects of aestheticism. Aestheticism is a critical terminology that refers to art that pursues beauty. It asserts the autonomy of art and that aesthetic value is art's main priority with its arrangement of exotic subject matters and erotic poetic diction to combine heterogeneous poetic language in an unfamiliar way.

=== Early writing ===
In his earlier writings, Kim often described sensual impressions of objects under examination in an unfamiliar way. Although the subject was described in an objective manner, he would simultaneously use strange words and diction in order to construct a fantasy-like atmosphere. By simultaneously representing two objects that seemingly had no relation to each other whatsoever, readers are thus able to imagine a different world.

=== Later writing ===
In his later writings, the sensuous impressions of objects still appear, but his own subjective voice intervenes in these descriptions, revealing Kim's own introspection regarding himself and his life. The distance between the object and the self disappears, and the object is felt to provide some sort of consolation to the self. With his final poetry collection released in 2005, Nugunga danyeogatdeusi (누군가 다녀갔듯이As If Someone Stopped By), Kim Youngtae's poetry becomes "a conversation with the self." The narrator observes the object, experiencing it in a sensuous manner until he finally inserts himself and completes the landscape. While feeling a sense of impotence towards the self and the life that one has lived, through the sheer existence of minor things and seeing them in a new light, life is illuminated with a new meaning and undergoes an active transformation.

=== Poeticization of experiences with art ===
Kim Youngtae constructs his poetic world by giving language to diverse forms of art. He has been noted for perceiving and expressing art in and of itself in his works, especially for using his personal artistic experiences as the foundation for his works—an unusual characteristic that is difficult to find in other Korean poetry. For instance, his poem "Balladeu" (발라드 Ballad) is a linguistic rendering of Frédéric Chopin's piano compositions. Chopin's music is constructed as a preceding text to poetry, so that the sound of music is rendered into metaphors such as "water drops falling at the bottom of the spine" and "a fleshy piece of trembling zephyrs." Sounds, the body's movements, and visual images are linked to the other senses and manifested through language—a common writing technique that threads Kim Youngtae's poetry.

== Works ==
=== Complete poetry collections ===
《물거품을 마시면서 아껴가면서》, 천년의 시작, 2005 / Mulgeopumeul masimyeonseo akkyeogamyeonseo (To Drink and Save Bubbles), Poem sijak, 2005.

=== Poetry collections ===
《유태인이 사는 마을의 겨울》, 중앙문화사, 1965 / Yutaeini saneun maeurui gyeoul (Winter in the Village of the Exile), Jungang munhwasa, 1965.

《바람이 센 날의 인상》, 현대시학사, 1970. / Barami sen narui insang (Impressions of Windy Days), Hyeondaesihaksa, 1970.

《초개수첩》, 현대문학사, 1975. / Chogaesucheop (Notebook of Worthless Straw), Hyundae Munhak, 1975.

《객초》, 문예비평사, 1978. / Gaekcho (Cigarettes for Guests), Moonye, 1978.

《여울목 비오리》, 문학과 지성사, 1981. / Yeoulmok biori (The Duck in the Neck of the River Rapids), Moonji, 1981.

《결혼식과 장례식》, 문학과 지성사, 1986. / Gyeolhonsikgwa jangnyesik (A Wedding and a Funeral), Moonji, 1986.

《매혹》, 청하, 1989. / Maehok (Captivation), Cheongha, 1989.

《느리고 무겁게 그리고 우울하게》, 민음사, 1988. / Neurigo mugeopge geurigo uulhage (Slowly, Heavily, and Sorrowfully), Minumsa, 1989.

《고래는 명상가》, 민음사, 1993. / Goraeneun myeongsangga (Whales Are Contemplators), Minumsa, 1993.

《남몰래 흐르는 눈물》, 문학과 지성사, 1995. / Nammollae heureuneun nunmul (Secretly Flowing Tears), Moonji, 1995.

《그늘 반근》, 문학과 지성사, 2000. / Geuneul bangeun (The Shadow's Entangled Roots), Moonji, 2000.

《누군가 다녀갔듯이》, 문학과 지성사, 2005. / Nugunga danyeogatdeusi (As If Someone Stopped By), Moonji, 2005.

=== Poetry anthologies ===
《북호텔》, 민음사, 1979. / Bukotel (Book Hotel), Minumsa, 1979.

《어름사니의 보행》, 지식산업사, 1984. / Eoreumsaniui bohaeng (The Tightrope Walker's Steps), Jisik, 1984.

《가을, 계면조 무게》, 미래사, 1991. / Gaeul, gyemyeonjo muge (Autumn, The Weight of the Musical Scale), Milaesa, 1991.

《과꽃》, 지만지, 2012. / Gwakkot (China Aster Flower), Jimanji, 2012.

=== Co-publications ===
《평균율》, 창우사, 1968. / Pyeonggyunyul (Average Rate), Changusa, 1968.

《평균율 2》, 현대문학사, 1972. / Pyeonggyunyul 2 (Average Rate 2), Hyundae Munhak, 1972.

〈피문어〉 외 2편, 《1987년 편지》, 청하, 1987. / "Pimuneo" and Two Other Poems in 1987nyeon pyeonji ("Devil Fish" and Two Other Poems in Letter from 1987), Cheongha, 1987.

〈가슴에 달린 서랍〉 외 4편, 《현대시 94》, 문학세계사, 1994. / "Gaseume dallin seorap" and Four Other Poems in Hyeondaesi 94 ("Drawer Hanging from the Chest" and Four Other Poems in Contemporary Poetry 94), Munhak Segyesa, 1994.

=== Essays on poetry ===
《변주와 상상력》, 고려원, 1984. / Byeonjuwa sangsangnyeok (Variations and Imagination), Goryeowon, 1984.

《장판지 위에 사이다 두병》, 책세상, 2002. / Jangpanji wie saida dubyeong (Two Bottles of Cider on Top of the Linoleum Floors), Chaek Sesang, 2002.

=== Collected prose ===
《지구위에 조그마한 방》, 지식산업사, 1977. / Jiguwie jogeumahan bang (A Small Room on Top of the Earth), Jisik, 1977.

《눈썹을 그리는 광대》, 문장사, 1977. / Nunsseobeul geurineun gwangdae (The Eyebrow-Drawing Performer), Munjangsa, 1977.

《간주곡》, 문예비평사, 1979. / Ganjugok (Musical Interlude), Moonye, 1979.

《물 위에 피아노》, 고려원, 1980. / Mul wie piano (Piano on Top of the Water), Goryeowon, 1980.

《질기고 푸른 빵》, 소설문학사, 1981. / Jilgigo pureun ppang (Tough Green Bread), Soseol, 1981.

《백색 신부들에게》, 자유문학사, 1987. / Baeksaek sinbudeurege (To the White Brides), Jayu, 1987.

《예술가의 삶》, 혜화당, 1993. / Yesulgaui sam (The Artist's Life), Hyehwadang, 1993.

《핀지콘티니가의 정원》, 월간오디오사출판부, 1993. / Pinjikontinigaui jeongwon (The Garden of the Finzi-Continis), Wolgan Audio, 1993.

《징검다리》, 혜화당, 2002. / Jinggeomdari (Stepping Stones), Hyehwadang, 2002.

《초개일기》, 눈빛, 2017. / Chogaeilgi (Diary of Worthless Things), Noonbit, 2017.

=== Critical essays on dance ===
《갈색 몸매들, 아름다운 우산들》, 지문사, 1985. / Galsaek mommaedeul, areumdaun usandeul (Brown Figures, Beautiful Umbrellas), Jimunsa, 1985.

《막간》, 청하, 1987. / Makgan (Intermission), Cheongha, 1987.

《저녁의 코펠리아》, 고려원, 1988. / Jeonyeogui kopellia (Coppélia in the Evening), Goryeowon, 1988.

《연두색 신의 가구들》, 시와 시학사, 1991. / Yeondusaek sinui gagudeul (The Yellow-Green Furniture of the Gods), Siwa sihaksa, 1991.

《눈의 나라 사탕비누들》, 눈빛, 1993. / Nunui nara satangbinudeul (Candy Soaps in the Land of Snow), Noonbit, 1993.

《멀리서 노래하듯》, 눈빛, 1995. / Meolliseo noraehadeut (Like Singing from Afar), Noonbit, 1995.

《사라지는 사원 위에 달이 내리고》, 눈빛, 1997. / Sarajineun sawon wie dari naerigo (The Moon Descends Above the Disappearing Temple), Noonbit, 1997.

《남천도 조금》, 눈빛, 1999. / Namcheondo jogeum (A Little Bit of the Southern Sky), Noonbit, 1999.

《춤으로 풍경을 만든다면》, 서울문학포럼, 2000. / Chumeuro punggyeongeul mandeundamyeon (Creating Landscapes Through Dance), Seoul Munhak Forum, 2000.

《사물을 넘어 마음으로》 눈빛, 2001. / Samureul neomeo maeumeuro (Beyond Objects and With the Heart), Noonbit, 2001.

《아무것도 아니지만 우리는 '있다'》, 눈빛, 2002. / Amugeotdo anijiman urineun titdat (We Are Not Anything, But We "Exist"), Noonbit, 2002.

《당신의 발끝으로》, 눈빛, 2003. / Dangsinui balkkeuteuro (To the Tips of Your Toes), Noonbit, 2003.

《살아있는 춤 눈으로 쓴 시》, 눈빛, 2004. / Sarainneun chum nuneuro sseun si (Vibrant Dance, Poetry Written with the Eyes), Noonbit, 2004.

《저 멀리 크리스탈》, 눈빛, 2006. / Jeo meolli keuriseutal (That Faraway Crystal), Noonbit, 2006.

《풍경을 춤출 수 있을까(1969–1996)》, 눈빛, 1996. / Punggyeongeul chumchul su isseulkka (1969–1996) (Can You Dance the Scenery? (1969–1996)), Noonbit, 1996.

《풍경을 춤출 수 있을까(1996–2005)》, 눈빛, 2005. / Punggyeongeul chumchul su isseulkka (1996–2005) (Can You Dance the Scenery? (1996–2005)), Noonbit, 2005.

=== Art books ===
《잠시 머물렀던 환영들》, 열화당, 1980. / Jamsi meomulleotdeon hwanyeongdeul (Visions of Brief Stays), Yeolhwadang, 1980.

《섬 사이에 섬》, 현암사, 1982. / Seom saie seom (Islands Between Islands), Hyeonamsa, 1982.

《인간의 집》, 보리수, 1985. / Inganui jip (House of Humans), Borisu, 1985.

《연습곡 98번》, 융성출판, 1987. / Yeonseupgok 98beon (Étude no. 98), Yungseong chulpan, 1987.

《왕래》, 디자인사, 1989. / Wangnae (Coming and Going), Design, 1989.

《편도 나무들》, 한마음사, 1991. / Pyeondo namudeul (Almond Trees), Hanmaeumsa, 1991.

《선의 나그네》, 말과글, 1992. / Seonui nageune (The Traveler of Lines), Malgwageul, 1992.

《육도 간격의 산책》, 재원, 1997. / Yukdo gangyeogui sanchaek (A Six-Way Walk), Jaewon, 1997.

《시인의 초상》, 지혜네, 1998. / Siinui chosang (The Poet's Mourning), Jihyene, 1998.

=== Music criticism ===
《음의 풍경화가들》, 서적포, 1991. / Eumui punggyeonghwagadeul (Landscape Painters of Sound), Seojeokpo, 1991.

《音, 꿈의 전람》, 돋을새김, 2004. / Eum, kkumui jeollam (Sound, the Exhibition of Dreams), Doduls, 2004.

== Awards ==
- Contemporary Literature (Hyundai Munhak) New Writer's Award (1972)
- Association of Korean Poets Award (한국시인협회상, 1982)
