= Hwang In-suk =

South Korean poet (born 1958)

- Born: December 21, 1958 (age 67); Seoul, South Korea
- Education: Seoul Institute of the Arts
- Occupation: Poet
- Writing career
- Language: Korean

- Korean name
- Hangul: 황인숙
- Hanja: 黃仁淑
- RR: Hwang Insuk
- MR: Hwang Insuk

Hwang In-suk (Korean: 황인숙; born December 21, 1958) is a South Korean poet.

== Life ==
Hwang In-suk was born December 21, 1958, in Seoul, South Korea. She debuted in 1984 with the poem I'll Be Born as a Cat. As the title of her debut poem suggests, Hwang is deeply interest in society's "alley cats", the lonely, isolated existences of the city, both human and feline. In fact, Hwang admits that she still sets out water and food for the stray cats in her neighborhood. She says that although she never sees the cats she feeds, she enjoys the feeling of returning and finding the dishes empty.

Friends of Hwang have named her the "poet of the 4 haves and the 4 have-nots". The four "have-nots" are home, money, husband, and children; the four "haves" are poetry, friends, a non-possessive spirit and a giving heart.

== Work ==
The Korea Literature Translation Institute says, about Hwang:

As in the line "A neighborhood where cats no longer live /is a neighborhood empty of the human soul" (selected passage from "Look After the Cats"), the poet values careful observance of one's surroundings, calling together the poor, shabby, lonely existences, and giving them words of comfort so that our souls do not become empty. In this way, loneliness is treated as an important theme in her poetry. Hwang says, "If you look carefully, whether spirits or humans or things, somewhere someone is muttering 'I'm lonely'". It is this "incurable disease", she says, that leads people to sink themselves in grief. Still, she finds the loneliness is not easily overcome. She writes about hopes that are always hiding somewhere. Those hopes are achieved through a poetic method that grasps at life's truths through pure language. She transmits this awareness to her readers. "Let's go back. To the beauty of language, the warmth of language, the softness of language. If we can do that, then we will grow closer to the beauty of life, the softness of life, the warmth of life."

Loneliness is an important theme in Hwang's work. The poet says, "If you look carefully, whether spirits or humans or things, somewhere someone is muttering 'I'm lonely'".

Hwang has been extremely prolific, with at least thirteen collections published since 1988.

Hwang has had at least one work published in translation, online, Above the Roof.

== Awards ==
- 1999 Dongseo Literary Award
- 2004 Kim Suyeong Literary Award
- 2018 Hyundae Munhak [Contemporary Literature] Award

== Works in Korean (Partial) ==
Poetry Collections

- The Birds Set the Sky Free (Saedeuleun haneuleul jayuropge puleonok'o, Munhak gwa jiseongsa, 1988)
- Sadness Awakens Me (Seulpeumi naleul ggaeunda, Munhakgwa jiseongsa, 1990)
- We Meet Like Snowbirds (Urineun cheolsae cheoreom mannadda, Munhakgwa jiseongsa, 1994)
- My Gloomy, Precious One (Na ui chimulhan, sojunghan iyeo, Munhakgwa jiseongsa, 1998)
- The Evident Stroll (Jamyeonghan sanchaek, Munhakgwa jiseongsa, 2003)
- Night Train to Lisbon (Liseubon haeng yagan yeolcha, Munhakgwa jiseongsa, 2007)

Prose Collections

- I am Lonely (Naneun godok hada, Munhak dongne, 1997)
- The Flesh is Sad (Yukcheneun seulpeora, Pureun chaekdeul, 2000
- The People on the Roof (Jibung wi ui salamdeul, Munhak dongnem, 2002)
- Writings by Hwang In-suk (Insukmanpil, Maeumsanchaek, 2003)
- Now, Those Hearts Again (Ije dashi geu maeumdeuleul, Ida Media, 2004)
- What Alleys Contain (Geu golmoki pumgo inneun geotdeul, Saemteosa, 2005)
- Patterns of the Voice (Moksori ui muneui, Saemteosa, 2006)
- Days of Joy (Ilillangnak, Maeum sanchaek, 2007)
