= Oh Kyu-won =

Korean writer

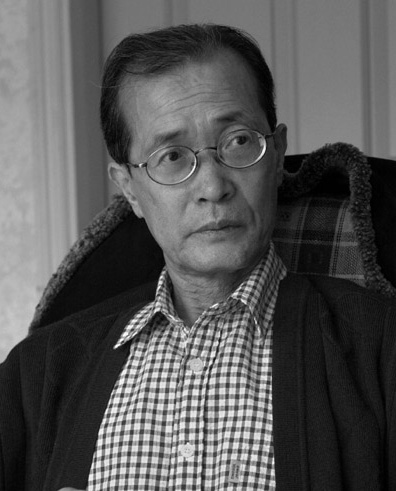
- Oh Kyu-won
- Born: December 29, 1941
- Died: February 2, 2007 (aged 65)
- Writing career
- Language: Korean

Korean name
- Hangul: 오규원
- Hanja: 吳圭原
- RR: O Gyuwon
- MR: O Kyuwŏn

Oh Kyu Won (Korean: 오규원; December 29, 1941 – February 2, 2007) was a South Korean writer.

== Biography ==
Oh Kyu Won's original name was Oh Gyuok. He was born on December 29, 1941 in Miryang, Keishōnan Province, Korea, Empire of Japan. He attended Busan Teachers' School before graduating from the Law Department of Dong-a University. He was the president of the Munjangsa publishing company and a professor in the Department of Creative Writing at the Seoul Institute of the Arts.

== Work ==
Oh Kyu Won's early poems used witty and ironic language in an effort to destroy established forms and provide a critique of capitalist consumer culture. Through the process of the endless deconstruction and regeneration of his poetic material, he refashioned everyday words and recognizable images in order to capture particular features of our mental landscape that are generally passed by unnoticed. His poems thus derive strength from the quotidian, but only by recreating and reconceptualizing it. Irony is techniques used by Oh to criticize a false and fetishistic ideal world. By thus lifting aspects of the mundane and banal out of the fabric of our "modern unconsciousness," he aims to capture the contradictory and complex features of the modern petit bourgeois. Oh's poems also demonstrate the influence of fables and his fascination with common words, which he often uses as elements of parody and ironic critique.

Oh Kyu Won's work has attempted to demolish old conceptual frames and assumptions and to look at the world in its naked reality. In order to do this, Oh frequently uses the technique of reversal:

The coffin of the man asphyxiated by coal briquet gas
Passes through the gate of the apartment dragging two men along
A lilac tree steps out of the crowd of onlookers and leaves reality in the company of the coffin.

Through such reversals of death and life, Oh provides a point of view that could be characterized as Brechtian.

Oh received prizes such as the Contemporary Literature Prize and the Yeonam Literature Prize as well as the Korea Culture and Arts prize for Literature and I-San Literary Award.

== Works in Korean (partial) ==
Collections and Anthologies

- A Definite Event (Bunmyeonghan sageon; 1971)
- A Pilgrimage (Sullye; 1973)
- The Technique of Love (Sarangui gigyo; 1975)
- To a Boy Who is not a Prince (Wangjaga anin han aiege; 1978)
- A Lyrical Poem Written in this Land (I ttange ssuieojineun seojoengsi; 1981)
- Living Making Hope (Huimang mandeulmyeo salgi; 1985)
- Life Under Heaven (Hanuel araeui saeng; 1989)

Poetics & Composition

- Reality and Stoicism (1982)
- Language and Life (1983)
- Methods of Modern Poetic Composition. (1990)

== Awards ==
- Contemporary Literature Prize
- Yeonam Literature Prize
- Korea culture and Arts Prize for Literature
- I-San Literary Award
