= Kim Sa-in =

Kim Sain
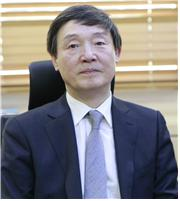
- Born: 1956 (age 69–70)
- Citizenship: South Korean
- Education: Seoul National University
- Writing career
- Language: Korean, English, Chinese
- Genres: Poetry, literary criticism

- Korean name
- Hangul: 김사인
- Hanja: 金思寅
- RR: Gim Sain
- MR: Kim Sain

Kim Sain or Kim Sa-in is a South Korean poet, literary critic, and professor of creative writing at Dongduk Women's University. Kim has been appointed as the 7th President of the LTI Korea (Literature Translation Institute of Korea) in the Ministry of Culture, Sports, and Tourism of South Korea, which is an Undersecretary-level position.

== Life ==
Kim was born in Boeun, North Chungcheong Province and studied Korean Literature at Seoul National University. Following time in prison for pro-democracy movement in the early 1980s, he began writing poetry and co-founded the magazine "Poetry and Economy." He has taught creative writing at Dongduk Women's University and Seoul National University. He was a visiting professor at Harvard University’s Korean Institute, and participated in the International Writing Program at the University of Iowa in 2010.

== Work ==
Kim debuted in the journal Poetry and Economics (Shi wa gyeongje) in 1982, during the period of the military government’s oppressive rule. He chose to respond to the pain of the period rather than ignore it, as he made clear in the preface to his first poetry collection: “fragments of an ungoverned rage and pain tear at the heart. But by what other method could I have afforded food in the 70s and 80s?” He therefore tries to foreground “the human” in his poetry. His poems adopt a disciplined form, but the subjects described in them are people from the general walk of life, often deficient in character or even stupid-sounding. The poet thus confesses, “I feel the warmth of humanity more in naivete and clumsiness, rather than in perfection and smoothness.”

Kim defines writing poetry as "questioning things tirelessly." But he emphasizes that the poet should not only ask questions: he must also find answers and actively put them into practice. By the same token, reading poetry means to participate in the poem with one's whole being, to become a part of the poem. Kim's poetics involves engagement with the poem, both by the poet who writes and the reader who reads. Poetry without full participation has no meaning.

== Awards ==
- 6th Shin Dong-Yup Grant for Creative Writing (1987)
- 50th Contemporary Literature Prize (2005)
- 14th Daesan Literature Prize for poetry (2006)
- 1st Lyric Poetry Prize (2007)
- 15th Ji-hoon Literature Prize (2015)
- 7th Imhwa Literary Arts Prize (2015)

== Works in Korean (Partial) ==
Poetry

- Night Letter (밤에 쓰는 편지, Cheongsa, 1987)
- Dream, Once Clear Day, on the 20th Anniversary of the Gwangju Uprising (Irum, 2000)
- The Homeless, in the 50th Modern Literature Prize Collection (Hyeondae Munhaksa, 2005)
- Liking in Silence (가만히 좋아하는, Changbi, 2006)
- Compiler, Best Poems of the Year (Hyeondae Munhaksa, 2004, 2005, 2009)
- Beside the Young Donkey (Changbi, 2015)

Essays

- "A Bowl of Hot Rice" (따뜻한 밥 한 그릇, Kunna, 2006)

Criticism

- "Poems from Here and Now: A Commentary on Kim Kwang-Kyu" in The Present Stage of Korean Literature 1 (Changbi, 1982)
- A Deep Reading of the Novels of Park Sang-Ryung (Munhakgwa Jiseongsa, 2001)
- "Feeling Poetry" (Publishing B, 2013)
