= Park Jeong-dae =

South Korean writer (born 1965)

- Born: 1965 (age 60–61)
- Writing career
- Language: Korean

Korean name
- Hangul: 박정대
- RR: Bak Jeongdae
- MR: Pak Chŏngdae

Park Jeong-dae (Korean: 박정대; born November 9, 1965) is a South Korean writer.

== Biography ==
Park Jeong-dae was born in 1965 in Jeongsan Gangwon Province, South Korea. He is a member of the poetic group the "International radical poetry" group. Park is well known in Korea for dressing casually - as a child his mother dressed him in a suit for the first day of school and he was so severely taunted that he refuses to wear formal clothes and, in his own words, has "a spirit of resistance and a desire to live freely."

Park entered the Department of Korean Literature at Korea University in 1984, but had to take time off from college to attend to his grandmother who suffered from leukemia. During this period Park wrote a number of short stories and poems, and after his grandmother's death, immediately entered Korea's compulsory military service for men. Twenty-seven months later, upon his exit, he re-enrolled in college and made his debut in 1990 with six poems including "The Aesthetics of Candlelight."

Park has served in the Korea Teachers' Union and is also serving as the editor of its monthly newsletter, Magnolia Report.

== Work ==
Park was a member of the so-called "April 19 generation" and the Korea Literature Translation Institute summarizes his contribution to Korean literature:

Park has stubbornly explored similar subject matters from similar perspectives in all his poetry. This persistence results from a sense of unresolved problems or issues in the poet's mind which he must pursue continually. Absurdities in life, frightful experiences and situations that defy logic and empathy—these things have compelled the poet to dream of a distant, alternative realm where possibilities of endless love still exist. The poet's attachment to his romantic ideals is in part a product of his youthful years spent in the atmosphere of political oppression and violent struggle for social reforms in the 1980s which undermined individual desires and romantic dreams. Although the poet in real life is politically active and socially responsible—he has joined National Union of Korean Teachers and served as an editor of its monthly newsletter, Magnolia Report—the narrator of his poetry remains a romantic figure who sings to the accompaniment of a guitar, gallop across a green meadow on a horse, and dream of a grandiose dream of love.

Park work has been described as using "idiosyncratic language to express the gloomy existential reality hidden behind the age of consumer capitalism."

== Awards ==
Park has won two South Korean literary prizes, the 14th Kim Dal-jin Literature Prize and the 19th Sowol Poetry Prize.

== Works in Korean ==
A partial list of works includes;

- Fragments (1997)
- In the Gyeong-eyolbiyeol-do of My Youth, Snow Still Falls like Music (2002)
- Amur Guitar (2004)
