= Kim Seunghui =

Korean poet, essayist and novelist (born 1952)

- Born: March 1, 1952 (age 74); Gwangju, South Korea
- Education: Master's Degree
- Alma mater: Sogang University
- Occupations: Poet, essayist, novelist
- Writing career
- Language: Korean

Korean name
- Hangul: 김승희
- Hanja: 金勝熙
- RR: Gim Seunghui
- MR: Kim Sŭnghŭi

Kim Seunghui (Korean: 김승희; born March 1, 1952) is a South Korean poet, essayist, and novelist.

== Biography ==
Kim was born in Gwangju on March 1, 1952. She graduated from Chon-nam Girls' High School. She majored in English Literature at Sogang University in Seoul, Korea from which she later received a doctorate in Korean Literature. In 1973, she made her official literary debut with her poem "Geu-rim sog-ui mul" (The Water in the Painting) when it won an entry in the Annual Contest for new writers held by Kyung-hyang Shin-mun (Kyung-Hyang Daily). Kim is currently a professor of Korean Literature at Sogang University.

== Work ==
The early work of Kim Seunghui is marked by a penchant for formalism, or 'art for art sake' and the poet's utilization of fierce, unabashed language. Her later poetry, however, evolved towards the exploration of quotidian reality and questions of perennial existence in freedom.

== Awards ==
Sowol Poetry Prize (1991)

== Works in Translation ==
- Walking on a Washing Line: Poems by Kim Seung-hee (김승희 시선)
- I want to Hijack an Airplane (김승희 시선)

== Works in Korean (Partial) ==
Poetry

- Tae-yang Mi-sa / Mass for the Sun (1979)
- Oen-son-eul wi-han hyeop-ju-gok / Concerto for the Left Hand (1983)
- Mi-wan-seong-eul wi-han Yeon-ga / Love Song for the Unfinished (1983)
- Dal-gyal sog-ui Saeng / Life Within an Egg (1989)
- Eot-teo-ke bakk-eu-ro na-gal-kka / How Can I Get Out (1991)
- Bit-jaru-reul Ta-go Dal-li-neun Us-eum / Laughter Flying on a Broomstick (2002)

Essays

- Sam-sip-sam-se-ui pang-se / Pensée at the Age of thirty-three (1985)
- Go-dog-ul ga-ri-ki-neun si-gye-ba-neul / Clock Hands that Point to Loneliness (1986).
- Sip-sam-in-ui a-hae-ga wi-heom-ha-o / Thirteen Children are in Danger (1982)

Novels

- San-ta-pe-ro Ga-neun Saram / The One Who is Leaving for Santa Fe (1997)
- Oen-jjok Nal-gae-ga Yak-kan Mu-geo-un Sae / The Bird with a slightly Heavier Left Wing (1999)
