= Park Young-geun =

South Korean poet (1958–2006)

- 박영근
- Born: September 3, 1958
- Died: May 11, 2006 (aged 47)

Park Young-geun (Korean: 박영근; September 3, 1958 – May 11, 2006) was a South Korean poet. He was in the front lines of many labor and democratization movements, and he portrays the lives and emotions of these protestors using vivid language in his writing. Park is well-known as the original author of the widely popular protest song from the 1990s, "Pine Tree, Green Pine Tree" (솔아 푸르른 솔아).

== Biography ==
=== Pre-debut ===
Park was born in 1958, in Buan County, North Jeolla Province. Because of his parents' enthusiasm for education, Park spent years away from his hometown, graduating from Iksan Middle School and Jeonju Highschool. As a high school student, he was an avid reader of Changbi Magazine, Sasanggye Magazine, and explored the works of Go Un, Hwang Seok-young, Kim Ji Ha and many others. His statements at school on the October Restoration and the Mincheong incident made him a person put under surveillance by his school. Deciding that the repressive school life would no longer be necessary, Park eventually withdrew himself from high school. The next year, he joined the high school literary circle and published a passionate poem in the style of Soviet Revolutionary poet Vladimir Mayakovsky. He subsequently faced hardships as he had his home searched and was taken into custody at the police station for 20 days. After this, he went to Seoul to participate in the labor movements and Christian Young Adult movements while continuing to write poems. He officially made his debut as a poet with the publication of poems such as "Suyurieso" (수유리에서 In Suyuri)

=== After his debut ===
In 1982, while working at a book-binding factory in the Guro Industrial Complex, Park actively engaged with activists in labor movements, student movements, culture movements of the masses, and Christian democracy movements. He participated as one of the leaders for various cultural activities and meetings, and founded the Folk Song Research Association (민요연구회) along with Shin Kyeong-nim, Im Jintaek, Jeong Huiseong, Gim Jeonghwan, and others. In 1984, he published a poetry collection, Chwieopgonggopan apeseo (취업공고판 앞에서 In Front of the Job Search Board) and a prose collection, Gongjangoksange olla (공장옥상에 올라 Up on the Factory Rooftop). Afterwards, he relocated to Bupyeong, Incheon until the 1990s living as a laborer and activist, while trying to faithfully reflect the realities of life as a worker in his writings. Furthermore, he participated in producing a video about Bak Jongcheol and worked at various publishing companies as a committee planning member or as an editor for literary magazines. In 1987, Park's poem "Baekje #6 Pine Tree, Green Pine Tree" - from the collection Chwieopgonggopan apeseo was adapted by An Chi-hwan for the song "Pine Tree, Green Pine Tree". "Pine Tree, Green Pine Tree" became a favorite song on college campuses and at labor strikes. Park won the Shin Dongyup Prize in 1994 and the Baeksok Literature Award in 2003. He died of a long-term illness in 2006. The Park Young-geun Award was established in 2015, and his entire collected work was published in 2016 to commemorate the 10th anniversary of his death.

== Writing ==
=== Poetry collection from the 1980s ===
A major theme in Park's works up until the second half of the 1980s is the everyday life and struggles of the worker. These works are based on Park's own experiences as a worker and the activist. That is, in the 1980s labor was the basic condition for Park to write his poetry. However, as the times changed, Park's poems also changed. Chwieopgonggopan apeseo (1984) discusses the unstable lives for Korean workers in the 70s and 80s. However, from the words of a poetic narrator, it is difficult to find solidarity or the worker's fighting spirit. For example, the narrator in the title poem "In Front of the Job Search Board" has been recently discharged from the army and stands face to face with the job search board grasping onto his resume in his hopeless situation. Therefore, the poetic narrator's interests cannot realistically describe the worker's reality or suggest any sort of prospect of freedom to the workers. Rather, the prominent idea in this collection is people's existential sadness as they are unable to claim their own space and must wander among the periphery of the city, while holding onto the longing and pity for family in their hometown. This aspect of Park's poems can be seen as a result of the poet's own past, as he was made to leave his hometown and make his own living in another city. Daeyeol (대열 Workers Queue; 1987) in comparison, discusses the worker becoming clearly aware of their own class identity, and foregrounds the conflict between worker unity and the fight against capitalism. The poet's struggle is finding effective methods while experimenting with various poetic forms. This includes adding poetic verses to a prose poem, or copying a whole wall of graffiti from factories onto the page, for example. What the poet wants most importantly out of these experiments is to establish a junction between poetry and reality. The opening lines from Pojang senteo (포장 센터 Packing Station), "The break bell rang and as I went to the bathroom I glanced at the shipping area lounge, and I stared at those dirty truck drivers and loading dock workers start to gamble", this passage reflects how the poet clearly understands the realities of the workers and their struggles. Through works such as "Nongseongjangui bam" (농성장의 밤 Strike Site Night), "Jabonga" (자본가 The Capitalist), "Amerika" (아메리카 America), "Ssaum jeonya" (싸움 전야 The Eve of the Fight), and others, Park, from the title alone, is able to capture the subject matter and themes of labor struggle. Park is able to present almost every aspect of 1980s labor reality in his vivid writing.

=== Poetry collection from the 1990s ===
In Gimmisunjeon (김미순전 The life of Gim Misun; 1993), the poetic narrator appears as an individual, rather than as a member of a community who voices solidarity to fellow workers. The optimism toward the worker's struggles and will are pushed to the background, while fading memories of the struggles in the past are presented with painful emotion. These changes reflect the rapid decline and stagnation of Korea's labor movements in the 1990s. Park's last poetry collection published during his lifetime was Jeo kkochi bulpyeonhada (저 꽃이 불편하다That Flower is Uncomfortable; 2002); Park gazes upon the path that he has walked. "Gil" (길 Road) describes the road he has taken until this point, describing it as desolate winter scenery. Although, the poet arrives at home at the end of his difficult journey, he is unable to find any vestige of those that he tenderly remembers. Ultimately, the poet finds himself wandering endlessly without a home. The self-awareness of the poet that he is standing on the road, in spite of all that, enables him to endure the weight of life's futility and maintain the tension of existence in reality.

== Works ==
=== Anthology ===
- <솔아 푸른 솔아>, 강 , 2009. / Sora pureun sora (Pine Tree, Green Pine Tree), Gang, 2009
- <박영근 전집> 1·2 ,실천문학사, 2016. / Bagyeonggeun jeonjip (Park Young-geun Collection), Silcheonmunhaksa, 2016

=== Collected works ===
- <취업공고판 앞에서>, 청사, 1984 / Chwieopgonggopan apeseo (In Front of the Job Search Board), Cheongsa, 1984
- <대열>, 풀빛 , 1987. / Daeyeol (Workers Queue), Pulbit, 1987
- <김미순전(傳)>, 실천문학사 , 1993. / Gimmisunjeon (The life of Gim Misun), Silcheonmunhaksa, 1993
- < 지금도 그 별은 눈뜨는가> 창비, 1997. / Jigeumdo geu byeoreun nuntteuneunga (Does the Star Open its Eyes Still), Changbi, 1997.
- <저 꽃이 불편하다>, 창비,2002. / Jeo kkochi bulpyeonhada (That Flower is Uncomfortable), Changbi, 2002
- <별자리에 누워 흘러가다>, 창비, 2007. / Byeoljarie nuwo heulleogada (Floating on Constellations), Changbi, 2007

=== Prose collections ===
- <공장 옥상에 올라>, 풀빛 , 1984. / Gongjangoksange olla (Up on the Factory Rooftop), Pulbit, 1984

=== Essays ===
- <오늘, 나는 시의 숲길을 걷는다>, 실천문학사 , 2004. / Oneul, naneun siui supgireul geonneunda (Today, I Walk through the Path in the Poetry Forest), Silcheonmunhaksa, 2004

=== Awards ===
- Shin Dongyup Prize (1994)
- Baeksok Literature Award (2003)
