= Park Ynhui =

South Korean writer (1930–2017)

- Born: February 26, 1930
- Died: March 26, 2017 (aged 87)
- Writing career
- Pen name: Park Yeemun
- Language: Korean

Korean name
- Hangul: 박인희
- Hanja: 朴仁熙
- RR: Bak Inhui
- MR: Pak Inhŭi

Art name
- Hangul: 박이문
- Hanja: 朴異汶
- RR: Bak Imun
- MR: Pak Imun

Park Ynhui (Korean: 박인희; February 26, 1930 – March 26, 2017) was a South Korean poet and writer who publishes under the name Park Yeemun in Korean.

== Life ==
Park was born on February 26, 1930. He graduated from Seoul National University with an undergraduate degree in French literature. He then attended the Sorbonne in Paris, from which he received a PhD in Philosophy. Park spent 30 years as a professor in, Japan, Germany, France, and the United States. He taught in Boston [at Simmons College] until his retirement in 1993 at which point he returned to South Korea where he taught at Pohang University and Yonsei University. Park died on March 26, 2017, at the age of 87.

== Work ==
Park published many books and papers, mainly on philosophical topics in both French and English. He published five volumes of Korean poetry: The Snow on the Charles River (1979), Dream of a Butterfly (1981), The Shadows of the Invisible (1987) and Resonances of the Void (1989) and in 1999 has published his own poetry in English, Broken Words. Then, in 2006, he published Morning Stroll, which earned him the Incheon Prize. Park's 'non' literary works include Roadmap to a Green Korea and The Journey Isn't Over Yet.

Translator Brother Anthony (An Sonjae) summarizes Park and his work:

Park's poem's are not difficult, they are usually simple and suggestive, inviting the reader to share an experience of some moment, some scene, in which the underlying void seems to have yielded to value and meaning.
...
Park is a poet inhabited by a compassion born of the suffering he witnessed and experienced in childhood and youth. His poems re-enact a search for consolation and peace, faced with the meaninglessness and absurdity of human existence.

== Works in Translation ==
- The Snow on the Charles River
- Shadows of the Void
- Verbrochene Worter (German)

== Works in Korean (Partial) ==
- The Snow on the Charles River (1979)
- Dream of a Butterfly (1981)
- The Shadows of the Invisible (1987)
- Resonances of the Void (1989)
- Morning Stroll (2006)
- Shadows of the Void (2006)
- The Fury of Elephants Raised as Orphans (2010)

== Awards ==
- 2006: Inchon Award
- 2012: Tanso Cultural Award
