= Kim Sang-ok (poet) =

South Korean poet (1920–2004)

- Born: March 15, 1920; Tongyeong, Korea, Empire of Japan
- Died: October 31, 2004 (aged 84)
- Citizenship: South Korean
- Writing career
- Language: Korean

Korean name
- Hangul: 김상옥
- Hanja: 金相沃
- RR: Gim Sangok
- MR: Kim Sangok

Kim Sang-ok (Korean: 김상옥; March 15, 1920 – October 31, 2004) was a South Korean poet.

== Life ==
Kim Sang-ok was born on March 15, 1920, in Tongyeong, Korea, Empire of Japan and died on October 31, 2004. Kim's sobriquet was Chojeong. During his life, Kim was repeatedly imprisoned for spreading anti-Japanese sentiments. In 1938, along with Kim Yongho and Ham Yunsu, Kim participated in the literary group that produced the magazine 'Barley', in which Kim published the poems "A Grain of Sand" (Moraeal) and "The Tea Room" (Dabang) in 1938. Following Korean Liberation, Kim taught at Masan High School, Busan Girls' High School, and Gyeongnam Girls' High School. He founded the Tongyeong Writers' Association in 1956.

== Work ==
Kim began his literary career as a writer of sijo but eventually expanded his range to include free verse during the post-Liberation period. Kim's early work is marked by the contemplative attitude the poet assumes towards the world. Rather than attempting to affect change, early poems such as "Baekjabu" and "The Onset of Winter" (Ipdong) serve as passive reflections on the world. Kim's poetic world is also one of traditional lyricism, of moonlight, calabash flowers and pigtail ribbons, in which the poet seeks to overcome the violence of the past with the silence welling up within his breast.

Grounding his sijo in this traditional lyricism, Kim makes use of lucid, subtle language to express his desire to liberate the forces of life lying behind external phenomena. For this reason some critics say that Kim has successfully fused the abstract quality of Lee Eunsang's work with the fresh, vibrant sensibility found in Lee Byeonggi's poetry. In 1963, Kim began to attempt the modernization of the sijo form in his own work, emphasizing the composition of both a three-line and three-stanza sijo. In 1995, Kim won three awards: the Jungang Sijo Award, the Nosan Literary Prize and the 보관문화훈장 award.

== Works in Korean (partial) ==
Poetry collections

- Grass Harp (Chojeok)
- Songs of the Heights (Gowonui gok)
- Heretical Poems (Idanui si)
- Meditations (Uisang)
- Songs of Trees and Stones (Mokseogui norae)
- Three-Stanza Poems (Samhaengsi)
- Rubbing the Ink Stick (Meogeul galdaga)

Essays

- Poetry and Porcelain (1975)

== Awards ==
- The Jungang Sijo Award (1995)
- Nosan Literary Prize (1995)
- 보관문화훈장 award (1995)

== See also ==
- Korean independence movement
