= Literature Translation Institute of Korea =

Organization with the aim of promoting Korean literature and culture overseas

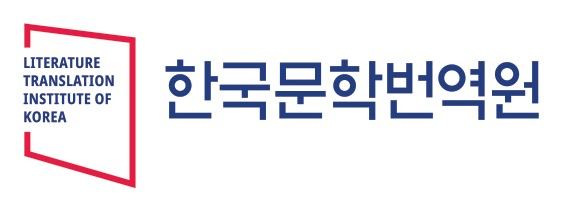
- Founded: 1996
- Type: Nonprofit organization
- Location: 06083 LTI Korea, 32, Yeongdong-daero 112-gil, Gangnam-gu, Seoul, South Korea
- Region served: Worldwide
- Leader: Kwak Hyo-hwan, President
- Website: http://www.ltikorea.or.kr

Korean name
- Hangul: 한국문학번역원
- Hanja: 韓國文學飜譯院
- RR: Hanguk munhak beonyeogwon
- MR: Han'guk munhak pŏnyŏgwŏn

The Literature Translation Institute of Korea (Korean: 한국문학번역원, LTI Korea, formerly known as Korean Literature Translation Fund) was founded in 1996 by the Government of South Korea with the aim of promoting Korean literature and culture overseas.

LTI Korea regularly sponsors translation and publication of Korean works to promote high-quality translation of Korean literature, and is pushing forward with various overseas exchange programs to strengthen the export base for Korean literature and establish a network for Korean and overseas publishers. It also works to foster professional translators to enhance the capacity of translation of Korean literature.

== History ==
- 1996
  - Korean Literature Translation Fund founded.
- 2001
  - Renamed Korean Literature Translation Institute; organization expanded. Dr. Park Huan-Dok appointed as the founding president.
- 2003
  - Dr. Chin Hyung Joon appointed to succeed Dr. Park as LTI Korea's second president.
- 2005
  - Declaration of a revision in the Culture and Arts Promotion Law; Status changed to a special corporation.
- 2006
  - Dr. Yoon Jikwan appointed as the third president of LTI Korea.
- 2009
  - Dr. Joo Youn Kim appointed as the fourth president of LTI Korea.
- 2010
  - Change of the law authorizing LTI Korea (Publishing Industry Promotion Act §20(2)).
- 2012
  - Dr. Kim Seong-kon appointed as the fifth and sixth president of LTI Korea.
- 2016
  - LTI Korea's foundation ordinance brought under the Literature Promotion Act, Article 13.
- 2018
  - Kim Sa-in appointed as the seventh president of LTI Korea.
- 2021
  - Kwak Hyo-hwan appointed as the eighth president of LTI Korea.

== Programs ==
LTI Korea supports various programs designed to promote awareness of Korean literature and culture abroad. Each program focuses on a specific goal dedicated to building an understanding of Korean literature and culture overseas.

Translation grants program

- Every quarter, LTI Korea selects and supports translations of various Korean works of literary fiction, poetry, plays, non-fiction, children's and YA books, genre fiction, and graphic novels. Each application is judged for the quality of the translation and the original work.
- From 2014, LTI Korea does not support the complete translation of the original work. LTI Korea initially provides a grant for the translation of a sample, and the grant for the remainder of the work will be provided after the translator and the author sign a publication contract with an international publisher.

Publication grants program

- Publication grants are offered to foreign publishers who have acquired copyrights to works that were translated with the support from LTI Korea.
- Since 2014, LTI Korea provides both translation and publication grants for foreign publishers who have acquired the rights to publish translated Korean literary works.

Support for international cooperation

In an effort to build a strong network between the translators, writers, and people engaged in the publishing business both inside and outside of Korea, LTI Korea holds and participates in various cultural events. The LTI Korea Forum was held in the US, France, Spain, China, Germany and Japan in 2011 with the most recent forum being held in Berlin, Germany in June 2012. Another significant event hosted by LTI Korea is Seoul International Writers' Festival which is held once every other year. In the festival held in 2010, 24 prominent writers from all over the world got together and had reading and talking sessions under the theme "Fantasy and Empathy". Among the writers that participated were Korean writers Bae Suah, Park Hyoung-su, Jeong Chan, Pyun Hye-young, Kim Min-jeong, Kim Haengsook, Choi Seungho, Na Huideok, Kim Nam-joong, and Kim Hye-jin. Korean-American writer Min Jin Lee, who won the New York Times Editor's Choice award for her debut novel "Free Food for Millionaires," and Pulitzer Prize winner Junot Díaz were also among the list of participants.

Education program

LTI Korea holds translation academies in English, French, German, Spanish, Chinese, Japanese, and Russian. Designed to be a translator-training program, it currently teaches nearly 100 students, with the aim of expanding the number to 200. Aside from nurturing prospective translators, LTI Korea encourages new and existing translators by awarding them with Korean Literature Translation Awards. Another form of effort to promote the exchange of information is LTI Korea's International Workshop on Translation and Publication of Korean Literature. The 11th International Workshop for Translation and Publication of Korean Literature discussed the globalization of Korean literature in times where Korean culture is receiving more attention than it ever did in the past, due to the popularity of K-pop singers.

Information service

Through the establishment and implementation of the LTI Korea medium and long-term strategy, its information services provide comprehensive information regarding Korean literature and publications and overseas publishing markets. By creating content relevant to the aforementioned in keeping with the new media environment, the information service ensures that LTI Korea's information services are integrated and up-to-date.

LTI Korea library

Opened to the public in 2007, the LTI Korea Library is the first library in Korea which contains collections of Korean books translated into various languages and published overseas. In addition to the translated editions of Korean books, it also collects periodicals on Korean literature, books on translation as well as CDs, DVDs, and video tapes on Korean literature.

== Periodicals ==
Korean Literature Now (formerly _list: Books from Korea), also known as KLN, is an English literary magazine showcasing Korean literature and writers through interviews, excerpts, features, translators' notes, and reviews of Korean literature published overseas. KLN has a circulation of about 5,000 including foreign publishers, agencies, Korean Studies programs, university libraries, cultural centers, and exclusive hotels in the Seoul-Gyeonggi-Incheon area.

== Korean literature in translation ==
LTI Korea Library continues to collect and provide bibliographies of Korean books translated and published in more than 40 languages worldwide.

== Location ==
Yeongdong-daero 112-gil 32 (Samseong-dong), Gangnam District, Seoul, South Korea Yeongdong-daero 112-gil 32 (Samseong-dong), Gangnam-gu, Seoul, Republic of Korea
