= Kim Haengsook =

South Korean poet (born 1970)

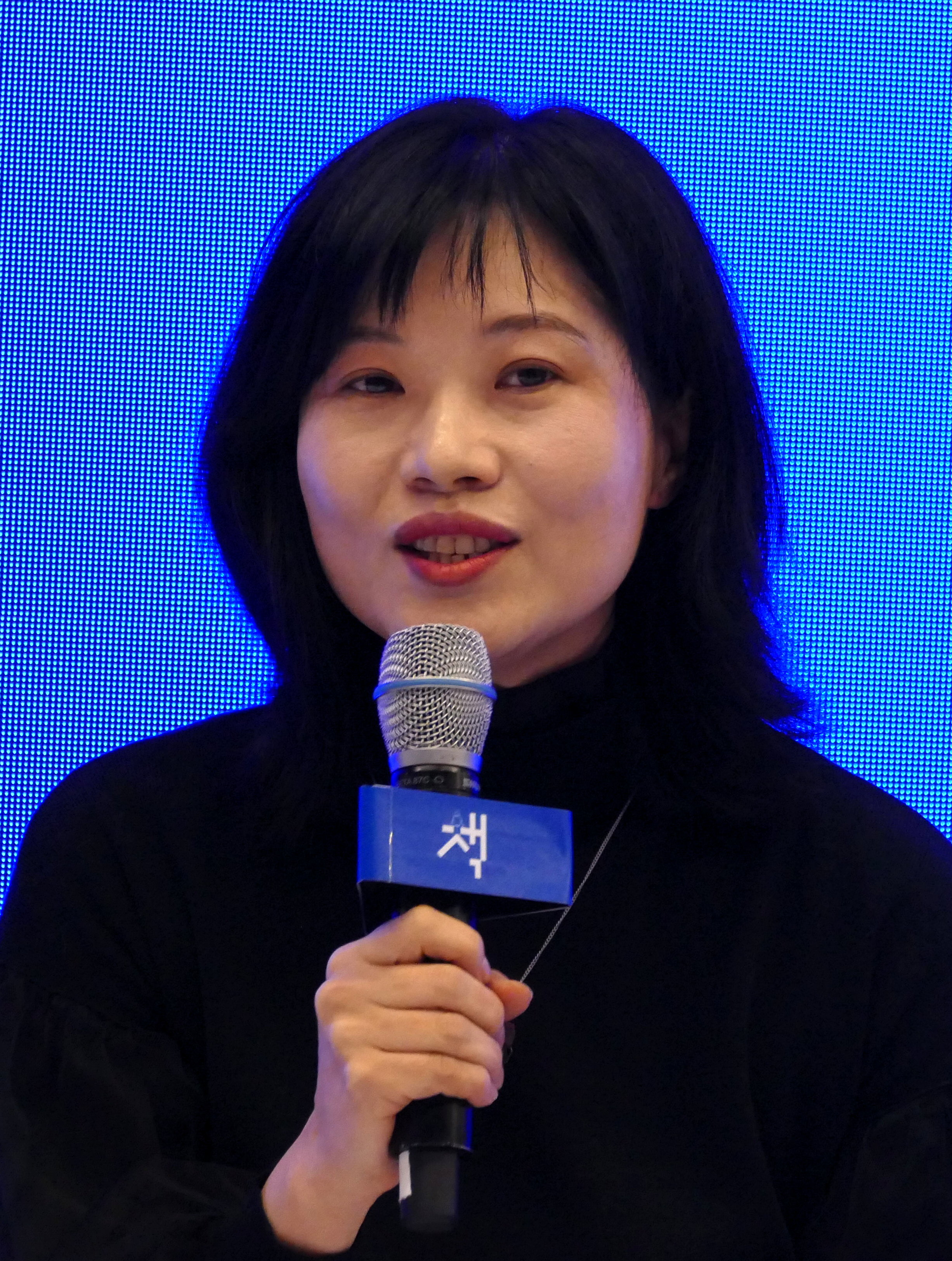
- Kim Haengsook at the Gothenburg Book Fair 2019
- Born: 1970 (age 55–56)

Korean name
- Hangul: 김행숙
- RR: Gim Haengsuk
- MR: Kim Haengsuk

Kim Haengsook (Hangul 김행숙; born 1970) is a South Korean poet.

== Life ==
Kim Haengsook was born in Seoul, South Korea in 1970. She studied Korean language at Korea University, where she also earned her master's and doctoral degree in Korean literature. She made her literary debut in 1999 when the journal Hyundae Munhak published "Ppul" (뿔 Horn) and a few of her other poems.

Kim is primarily associated with the Korean Futurism school of poetry, which emerged in the 2000s, when young poets began writing experimental works that broke with the lyrical tradition of South Korea. Kim published her first poetry collection Sachungi (사춘기 Adolescence) in 2003, which earned critical and popular acclaim for its unconventional style, and put her alongside other Korean Futurist poets like Hwang Byungsng, Kim Kyung Ju, Kim Min-jeong, and Ha Jaeyoun.

She won the 9th Nojak Literature Prize in 2009, the inaugural Jeon Bonggeon Literary Award in 2015, and the 16th Midang Literary Award in 2016. She was an editor for the quarterly journal World Literature, and currently teaches Korean literature at Kangnam University.

== Writing ==
Kim Haengsook's work has been referred to as "a symptom of contemporary poetry" that "achieved a new kind of lyricism" by writer and literary critic Lee Jangwook. Starting with her first poetry collection Sachungi (사춘기 Adolescence), the strangeness and ambiguity of her poems challenged readers to find new ways of interpreting them other than simply looking for meaning or images. In a commentary on her second poetry collection Ibyeoreui neungryeok (이별의 능력 The Ability to Part) (2007), literary critic Shin Hyeong-cheol argues that Kim "does not write with intuition but with the mind of a programmer" who has "the ability to enter into a particular world of feeling and to invite readers into that world."

Kim's language is open to various interpretations. It has been described as "sliding or floating across the signifier and the signified." Literary critic Shin Hyeong-cheol notes that Kim "breaks down the world into pieces of feeling and allows the self to become a vessel for each feeling. Her poetry is freely fantastical and unegotistically objective." Kim's third poetry collection Tainui uimi (타인의 의미 The Significance of Others) (2010) shows a slight change in style. The world of feeling she portrays in previous poems remains the same, but she focuses on the sensations born from the relationship between the Self and the Other. The Self strives to reach the Other, fails, and accepts a fate of solitude.

== Works ==
=== Poetry collections ===
1. 『사춘기』(문학과지성사, 2003)

Adolescence. Moonji, 2003.

2. 『이별의 능력』(문학과지성사, 2007)

The Ability to Part. Moonji, 2007.

3. 『타인의 의미』(민음사, 2010)

The Significance of Others. Minumsa, 2010.

『에코의 초상』(문학과지성사, 2014)

The Portrait of Echoes. Moonji, 2014.

=== Criticism ===
1. 『문학의 새로운 이해』(소명출판, 2004)

A New Understanding of Literature. Somyung Books, 2004.

2. 『문학이란 무엇이었는가』(소명출판, 2005)

What Was Literature? Somyung Books, 2005.

3. 『창조와 폐허를 가로지르다』(소명출판, 2005)

Crossing Creation and Ruin. Somyung Books, 2005.

=== Essay Collections ===
1. 『마주침의 발명』(케포이북스, 2009)

The Invention of Encounters. Kephoi Books, 2009.

2. 『에로스와 아우라』(민음사, 2012)

Eros and Aura. Minumsa, 2012.

=== Works in Translation ===
1. Poems of Kim Yideum, Kim Haengsook & Kim Min Jeong (English)
2. 舟: 2010 冬 (Japanese)

== Awards ==
1. 2009: 9th Nojak Literature Prize

2. 2015: 1st Jeon Bonggeon Literary Award

3. 2016: 16th Midang Literary Award
