= Ju-Kwan Cho =

- Born: 1953 (age 72–73)
- Education: Korea University / Ohio State University
- Occupations: Literary scholar and translator
- Writing career
- Language: Russian and Korean

Ju-Kwan Cho (Korean: 조주관; Hanja: 曺主冠; Korean pronunciation: [tɕo. tɕu. kwan]; born 1953) is a South Korean academic and translator of Slavic literature. He is well recognized for his major contributions to the field of Russian Studies in South Korean academia. He served as the president of the Korean Association of Russists (한국러시아문학회) from 1998 to 2000 and published many Korean-language translations of Russian literature, for which he was awarded a Medal of Pushkin by the Russian Government in 2000. In 2017, Cho also received an Order of Honor from the President of Georgia for his translation of Shota Rustaveli's The Knight in the Panther's Skin into the Korean language. Furthermore, he was awarded a Presidential Citation for his translations of Korean literary works into Russian by the South Korean government in 2018. He is a professor emeritus of Russian Language and Literature at Yonsei University.

== Life and career ==
Ju-Kwan Cho was born in Okcheon county, North Chungcheong province, South Korea in 1953. Cho and his family moved to Daejeon shortly after his birth. Inspired after reading The Brothers Karamazov during his mandatory military service, he went on to study Russian language and literature at Korea University, and completed his bachelor's degree in 1981 as part of the department's first cohort. He completed his master's degree in the same department in 1983. He then received his doctorate in Slavic Language and Literature at Ohio State University in 1991 as a Korean government fellow. Later, he briefly taught at Seoul National University as a lecturer.

In 1993, Cho became a professor of Russian language and literature at Yonsei University. He also served as a committee member at the Maxim Gorky Literature Institute in Moscow in 1996. From 1997 to 2000, he served on the committee of the International Association of Teachers of Russian Language and Literature (МАПРЯЛ) and as the 3rd president of the Korean Association of Russists (KAR) from 1998 to 2000. As president of KAR, he endeavored to facilitate academic outreach with local research institutes in Russia, including the Gorky Institute, marking the first effort at educational outreach between the two nations, enabled by the opening of diplomatic relations between South Korea and the Soviet Union in 1991.

Throughout his career, Cho has published several textbooks on Russian literature in Korean, striving to provide an accessible overview of Russian literary history to students and the general public through novel methods. His textbook, Hypertext of Russian Literature, presents each literary work in the form of hypertext, allowing readers to navigate back and forth between different works based on their conceptual and historical connections. His 2006 book The Poetics of Old Russian Literature (고대러시아 문학의 시학) was recognized by the South Korean Ministry of Culture, Sports and Tourism as an outstanding academic text (우수학술도서) in 2009.

Noting the scarcity of critical discussion and research on pre-19th century Russian Literature in Korean academia, Cho worked to publish more than 30 first translations of 11-18th century Russian and Slavic works of literature into Korean, an endeavor which took him over 10 years to complete. Among these translations were Shota Rustaveli's The Knight in the Panther's Skin, for which he was awarded an Order of Honor from the Georgian president Giorgi Margvelashvili in 2017, becoming the first Korean to receive the honor. Margvelashvili remarked that Cho's work was instrumental in laying a "steady foundation for academic outreach between South Korea and Georgia." Following this accomplishment, Cho became a 2017 inductee of the National Academy of Sciences of the Republic of Korea (NAS) and received a Presidential Citation by the South Korean government in 2018. In 2019, as part of a mutual exchange between the Literature Translation Institute of Korea and Belarusian publisher Mastatskaya Litaratura, In 2019, Cho contributed to the publication of 그래도 봄은 온다 (Spring will Come), a Korean-language collection of Belarusian poetry featuring the work of Yanka Kupala, Maksim Bahdanovič, and Yakub Kolas.

In his later career and retirement in 2019, Cho has turned his attention to the translation of Korean literary works into Russian, such as Yun Dong-ju's Sky, Wind, Star and Poem, Jeong Ho-seung's To the Daffodil, and Yi Seongbok's Ah, Those Things Without Mouths, endeavoring to foster a wider appreciation of Korean literature in the international community.

== Notable work ==
=== Derzhavin, Neoclassicism, and the Russian Baroque ===
Cho's most notable paper deals with the work of Gavrila Derzhavin, which has historically been identified by most scholars as structurally neoclassicist but seldom associated with the Baroque. Cho argues, alongside several other scholars, that Russian literature is an interesting context for discussing these two concepts, which are typically considered opposites in Western literature. The "neoclassical" is typically seen as more reserved, aspiring to return to a 'sensible' tradition through the precise and conservative recreation of classical imagery, whereas its opposite the "baroque" is better described as a dramatic celebration of the emotions of the present through an indulgent and exaggerated use of symbols and imagery.

Cho suggests that, because the Russian artist has no genuine historical connection to the 'classical' western tradition, their imitation of neoclassicist aesthetics requires the retroactive imagination of a faux-western tradition to which they can imitate the aspiration to return, an act that is in itself Baroque.

Cho argues that Derzhavin, a Russian writer whose work imitates the aesthetics and structures of Western classics in his work, subverts the meaning of their literary topoi by reimagining them in his own image rather than relying on their historical meanings. These topoi, "carpe diem," "memento mori," "ubi sunt," "brevitas vitae." which in isolation are thematically aligned with the classical and conservative fear of death and appreciation of life, are transformed into a fascination with the romance of living and dying through Derzhavin's dramatic reinterpretation of the phrases as conversational, forming a narrative of an individual's changing relationship with the thought of dying. This reinterpretation of classical forms into dramatic and indulgent emotional extremes, Cho describes this use of classical imagery as not strictly neoclassicist as it contains very baroque sensibilities, forming a "baroque neoclassicism."

=== Russian literature and visual art in dialogue ===
A significant portion of Cho's academic bibliography deals with the influence of the visual arts on the works of Russian writers, and the influence of Russian literature on visual artists. In 2008, he published "Dostoevsky's Iconography Code especially in <Sistine Madonna> and <Crime and Punishment>" (도스또옙스끼의 도상코드: <시스티나의 마돈나>와 <죄와 벌>을 중심으로), an intertextual study between Raphael's Sistine Madonna and Dostoyevsky's Crime and Punishment, which was later developed into the full-length book Drawings beloved by Dostoyevsky. The book traces the writer's affection for the visual arts and its influence on his work, accompanied by the illustrations contained in Dostoyevsky's own notes. It features re-translations of seven novels (The Idiot, The Brothers Karamazov, Demons, Crime and Punishment, Notes from Underground, The Adolescent and Polzunkov) alongside a historiography of Dostoyevsky's appreciation for paintings and galleries, and an analytic survey on his philosophy of art. The book was published in 2022 to critical acclaim; Journalist Hyun-Jung Park of Hankyoreh news notes that she found the work "accessible and fascinating, even to new readers unfamiliar with Dostoyevsky or the artworks discussed." In 2012, he published "The Artistic Imagination in Dialogue between Dostoyevsky and Munch" ("도스토옙스키와 뭉크의 대화적 상상력"), the first full-length comparative study of Norwegian painter Edvard Munch's well-documented idolization of Dostoyevsky and his work, from which he drew heavy influence and his paintings, which are heavily inspired by Dostoyevsky's writing. Cho argues that many of Munch's paintings are in "artistic dialogue" with Dostoyevsky's novels.

== Accolades ==
- 2000 Pushkin Medal
- 2000 Outstanding Accomplishment Professor Award (우수업적 교수상), Yonsei University
- 2009 Outstanding Research Professor Award (우수연구 교수상), Yonsei University
- 2012 Minister's Award (교과부장관상), Korean Ministry of Education, Science, and Technology
- 2015 Korean Association of Rusists Research Award (한국러시아문학회 학술상), Korean Association of Rusists
- 2017 Order of Honor, President of Georgia
- 2018 Presidential Citation, President of South Korea

== Publications ==
=== Books ===
- Hypertext of Russian Literature (러시아 문학의 하이퍼텍스트, 2005) ISBN 9788971153710
- The Poetics of Old Russian Literature (고대러시아 문학의 시학, 2008) ISBN 9788957331453
- A Contemporary Investigation into Crime and Punishment (죄와 벌의 현대적 해석, 2009) ISBN 9788971418994
- Metacognition in Dostoyevsky's Notes from Underground (도스토옙스키의 메타지식 : 지하로부터의 수기, 2017) ISBN 9791186430491
- Drawings beloved by Dostoyevsky: A Visual Guide (도스트옙스키가 사랑한 그림들, 2022) ISBN 9788950942373
- The Breadth and Depth of Russian Literature (러시아 문학의 넓이와 깊이, 2023) ISBN 9791166841484

=== Selected essays ===
- "Body Signs in The Novels of Nineteenth Century Russian Writers" (19세기 러시아 작가들의 몸 기호학) 러시아연구 (2007)
- The Baroque Weltanschauung and Topoi in Derzhavin's Poetics (제르좌빈의 시학에 나타난 바로크적 세계관과 토포이 문제) 러시아어문학연구논집 (2007)
- Problems of Evil in Old Russian Literature (고대러시아 문학작품에 나타난 악의 제문제) 러시아어문학연구논집 (2007)
- Dostoevsky's Iconography Code especially in <Sistine Madonna> and <Crime and Punishment> (도스또옙스끼의 도상코드: <시스티나의 마돈나>와 <죄와 벌>을 중심으로) 러시아어문학연구논집 (2008)
- The Artistic Imagination in Dialogue between Dostoyevsky and Munch (도스토옙스키와 뭉크의 대화적 상상력) 러시아어문학연구논집 (2012)

=== Selected translations ===
- Dushenka by Ippolit Bogdanovich
- Vadim of Novgorod & Misfortune from a Carriage by Yakov Knyazhnin
- The Minor & The Brigadier-General by Denis Fonvizin
- Dmitry the Pretender by Alexander Sumarokov
- Boris Godunov & Mozart and Salieri by Alexander Pushkin
- The Knight in the Panther's Skin by Shota Rustaveli
- Sky, Wind, Star and Poem by Yun Dong Ju (into Russian)
- To the Daffodil by Jeong Ho-Seung (into Russian)
- Ah, Those Things Without Mouths by Yi Seongbok (into Russian)

In addition, Cho has edited and published several Korean-language collections of Slavic poetry. These feature the work of Anna Akhmatova, Andrei Voznesensky, Bella Akhmadulina, Gavrila Derzhavin, Yanka Kupala, Maksim Bahdanovič, and Yakub Kolas, Bulat Okudzhava, and Osip Mandelstam.
