= Christopher Merrill =

American poet

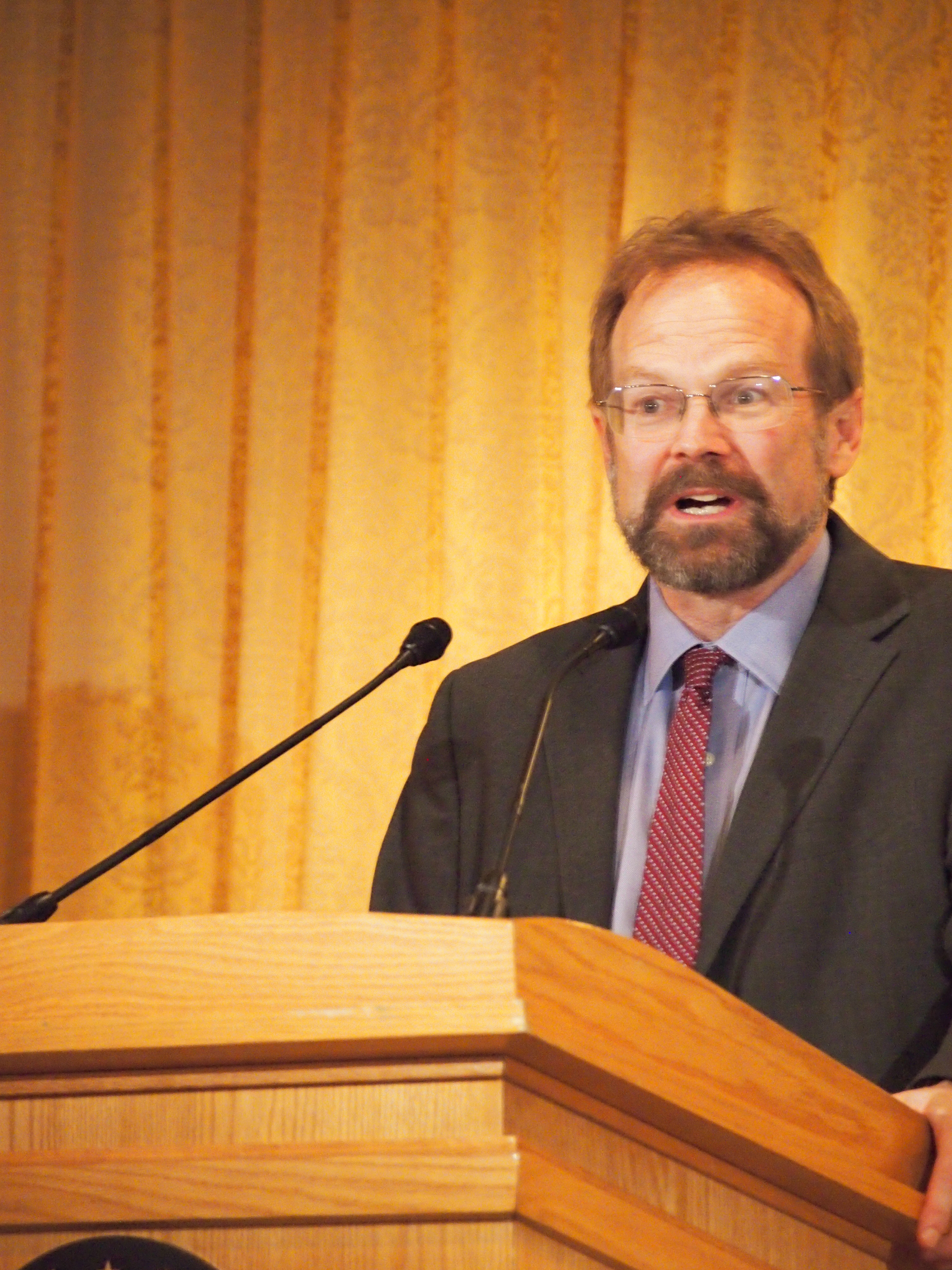
- Born: February 24, 1957 (age 69)
- Education: Middlebury College, University of Washington
- Occupations: Director, International Writing Program, the University of Iowa
- Writing career
- Language: English
- Genres: poetry, non-fiction, journalism, translations

Christopher Merrill (born February 24, 1957) is an American poet, essayist, journalist and translator. Currently, he serves as director of the International Writing Program at the University of Iowa. He led the initiative that resulted in the selection of Iowa City as a UNESCO City of Literature, a part of the Creative Cities Network. In 2011, he was appointed to the U.S. National Commission for UNESCO.

== Life and career ==
Christopher Merrill was born in western Massachusetts and raised in New Jersey. He did his undergraduate work at Middlebury College and his graduate degree at the University of Washington. He has published six collections of poetry, including Watch Fire, for which he received the Peter I. B. Lavan Younger Poets Award from the Academy of American Poets. He has also published translations, several edited volumes, and six books of nonfiction. His work has been translated into nearly 40 languages, and his journalism appears in many publications. For 10 years he was the book critic for the daily radio news program The World. Merrill's honors include a Chevalier from the French government in the Ordre des Arts et des Lettres. He held the William H. Jenks Chair in Contemporary Letters at the College of the Holy Cross before becoming the director of the International Writing Program at the University of Iowa in 2000.

== Works ==
=== Poetry ===
- Workbook (1988)
- Fevers & Tides (1989) ISBN 9780913793107
- Watch Fire (1995) ISBN 978-1-877727-43-6
- Brilliant Water (2001) ISBN 978-1-893996-12-0
- Seven Poets, Four Days, One Book (2009)
- Boat (2013)
- Necessities (2013)
- After the Fact: Scripts & Postscripts (2016) - in collaboration with Marvin Bell

=== Nonfiction ===
- The Grass of Another Country: A Journey Through the World of Soccer (1994)
- The Old Bridge: The Third Balkan War and the Age of the Refugee (1995)
- Only the Nails Remain: Scenes from the Balkan Wars (2001) ISBN 978-0-7425-1686-1
- Journey to the Holy Mountain: Meditations on Mount Athos (2004) - also published as Things of the Hidden God: Journey to the Holy Mountain (2005)
- Cultural Diplomacy: The Linchpin of Public Diplomacy (2005) - Report of the Advisory Committee on Cultural Diplomacy, U.S. Department of State
- The Tree of the Doves: Ceremony, Expediation, War (2011)
- Self-Portrait with Dogwood (2017)

=== Translation ===
- Anxious Moments by Aleš Debeljak (White Pine Press, 1995 ISBN 978-1-877727-35-1
- The Four Questions of Melancholy: New and Selected Poems of Tomaž Šalamun by Tomaž Šalamun (White Pine Press, 2007) ISBN 978-1-877727-57-3
- The City and the Child: Poems poems by Aleš Debeljak (1999)
- Because of the Rain: A Selection of Korean Zen Poems (2006)
- Even Birds Leave the World: Selected Poems of Ji-woo Hwang by Hwang Ji-u (2006)
- Scale and Stairs: Selected Poems of Heeduk Ra by Na Huideok (2009)
- Translucency: Selected Poems of Chankyung Sung by Seong Changyeong (2010) - with Kim Won-Chung
- The Growth of a Shadow: Selected Poems of Taejoon Moon by Mun Tae-jun (2012) - with Kim Won-Chung
- The Night of the Cat’s Return by Song Chanho (2015) - with Kim Won-Chung
- If My Tongue Refuses to Remain in My Mouth by Kim Seonu (2018) - with Kim Won-Chung

=== Collections and anthologies ===
- John McPhee (1988). Christopher Merrill (ed.). Outcroppings. Peregrine Smith Books. ISBN 978-0-87905-262-1.
- Christopher Merrill, ed. (1991). The Forgotten Language: Contemporary Poets and Nature. Peregrine Smith Books. ISBN 978-0-87905-376-5.
- What Will Suffice: Contemporary American Poets on the Art of Poetry From the Faraway Nearby: Georgia O'Keeffe as Icon (editor) (1995)
- The Way to the Salt Marsh: A John Hay Reader (editor) (1998)
- John Turnbull; Alon Raab; Thom Satterlee, eds. (2008). "A Boy Juggling a Soccer Ball". The Global Game: Writers on Soccer. University of Nebraska Press. p. 70. ISBN 978-0-8032-1078-3. "Christopher Merrill."
- William J. Walsh, ed. (2006). "Suite for Ashes and Strings". Under the rock umbrella: contemporary American poets, 1951-1977. Mercer University Press. ISBN 978-0-88146-047-6.
- The New Symposium: Poets and Writers on What We Hold in Common, edited with Natasa Durovicova. 2012.
- Flash Fiction International: Very Short Stories from Around the World, edited with Robert Shapard and James Thomas. 2015.
- The Same Gate: A Collection of Writings in the Spirit of Rumi, edited with Natasa Durovicova. 2018.

=== Translated works ===
- Christopher Merrill: Sajak sajak (Poems) - translated into Malay (2006)
- Why the Grass Whispered Again: Selected Poems - translated into Arabic (2007)
- Christopher Merrill: Notwendigkeiten (Necessities). Gedichte. translated into German. edition pen (No. 20) Löcker Verlag, Wien 2014, ISBN 978-3-85409-736-5.

== Awards, fellowships, and prizes ==
- Chevalier de l’Ordre des Arts et des Lettres, French Ministry of Culture and Communications (2006)

Paul Engle Award
