= Jang Seoknam =

South Korean poet (born 1965)

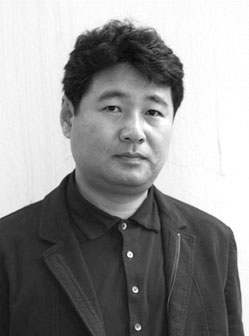
- Born: August 3, 1965 (age 61)
- Writing career
- Language: Korean

- Jang Seoknam
- Hangul: 장석남
- Hanja: 張錫南
- RR: Jang Seoknam
- MR: Chang Sŏngnam

Jang Seoknam (Korean: 장석남; born August 3, 1965) is a South Korean poet.

== Life ==
Jang Seoknam was born on August 3, 1965, in Incheon, South Korea. Jang earned an undergraduate degree in creative writing from the Seoul Institute of the Arts and a Ph.D. from the Inha University Graduate School of Literature. Since 2003 he has worked in two different positions as an assistant professor at Hanyang Women's University. Jang debuted as a poet in his early 20s in a New Year's Writers Contest sponsored by the magazine Kyunghyang Shinmun.

== Work ==
LIST Magazine characterizes Jang's work as, "(showing) the stature of a leading poet of lyricism with the purity of memory and an acute sense of language," and The Korea Literature Translation Institute summarizes his work:

In the epilogue included in his first collection Defecting to a Flock of Birds (Sae ddedeul egero ui mangmyeong), he confesses that he dreams daily of fusing together his life with music. Literature, he suggests, is merely a code, a sign that cannot be understood by a blind man; while music can be understood by everyone. This certainly is a surprising claim for a poet. But Jang says "poetry is a beautiful raft I must take to get to music, to dance, to the blaze." Most poets emphasize the absolute, transcendent qualities of language, but he does not mystify poetry or its medium, language, rather seeing it as a medium to reach something else that is absolute.

Thus the poet boldly announces, "I lay down my head where the door to language is shut." Jabbing at Descartes' famous maxim "I think, therefore I am," he says, "I exist completely as a poet only where language is absent." Jang's belief that 'dance' and 'music' are free from 'language' and 'morality' stems from his own individual ideas about language. Constantly absorbing worldly ideas and moral standards, language is impure and polluted. Yet language can never be abandoned because it serves as the basis for human thought and expression. Though it is impure, the poet tries attaining to expressions of ideal worlds such as 'dance' and 'music.'

This worldview of the poet makes his poetry "musical," not in the sense of rhythms and tones, but in the sense of aspiring to achieve the purity of music. He plays the instrument of silence called the world with language, and makes all things dance. This is the ideal aesthetic world that the poet seeks to create.

Jang's major poetry collections include Defecting to a Flock of Birds (1991); Now, doing my best to long for no one (1995); Teary Eye (1998); Pain in my heart (2001); Where do Smiles Go? (2006); Brighten the West on the Cheek (2010); Tranquility, Do Not Run Away (2012), and Worry about Stepping on a Flower (2017).

For his literary accomplishments, Jang has been awarded Kim Suyeong Literary(Poetry) Award in 1992, Hyeondae Literary(Poetry) Award in 1999, Midang Literature Prize in 2010, Kim Daljin Literary(Poetry) Award in 2012, Sanghwa Poetry Award in 2013, Jihun Literary(Poetry) Award in 2018, Pyeonun Literary(Poetry) Award in 2018, and Woohyun Art Prize in 2018.

Jang has not had any works in translation published formally, but noted translator of Korean poetry, Brother Anthony of Taizé has translated three of Jang's poems on his home page. These three poems are: Winter Pond; Hanging Plum-Blossom, and; I Turn off the Light. Since May 2018, American poet Paulette Guerin and Nursing Decision Scientist Claire Su-Yeon Park are collaborating on a translation of selected poems and prose for publication.

Jang participated in the 2018 Seoul International Writer's Festival as one of the 9 invited Korean poets.

== Works in Korean (Partial) ==
Poetry Collections

- Defecting to a Flock of Birds (1991)
- Now, doing My Best to Long for No One (1995)
- Teary Eye (1998)
- Pain in My Heart (2001)
- Where do Smiles Go? (2006)
- Brighten the West on the Cheek (2010)
- Tranquility, Do Not Run Away (2012)
- Worry about Stepping on a Flower (2017)

=== Prose Collections ===
- Water Station (2000)
- Sound of Drawing Water (2008)
- Everything We Love Is Far Away (2021)

== Awards ==
- 11th Kim Suyeong Literary Award in 1992
- 44th Hyeondae Literary(Poetry) Award in 1999
- 10th Midang Literary(Poetry) Award in 2010
- 23rd Kim Daljin Literary(Poetry) Award in 2012
- 28th Sanghwa Poetry Award in 2013
- 18th Jihun Literary(Poetry) Award in 2018
- 28th Pyeonun Literary(Poetry) Award in 2018
- 12th Woohyun Art Prize in 2018
- 32nd Jeong Jiyong Literary(Poetry) Award in 2020
