= Kim Min-jung =

Kim Min-jung or Kim Min-jeong (Korean: 김민정) is a Korean name consisting of the family name Kim and the given name Min-jung, and may refer to:

- Kim Min-jung (actress) (born 1982), South Korean actress
- Kim Min-jung (badminton) (born 1986), South Korean badminton player
- Kim Min-jung (speed skater) (born 1985), South Korean speed skater
- Kim Min-jung (sport shooter) (born 1997), South Korean sport shooter
- Kim Min-jung (TV presenter), news anchor and host for Arirang TV
- Kim Min-jung (curler) (born 1981), South Korean curler
- Kim Min-Jung (taekwondo), South Korean taekwondo practitioner, earned a gold medal for South Korea at the 2009 Asian Martial Arts Games
- Kim Min-jeong (synchronized swimmer), South Korean synchronized swimmer, competed in synchronized swimming at the 2002 Asian Games
- Kim Min-jeong (basketball), South Korean basketball player, played in the 2013 FIBA Under-19 World Championship for Women
- Kim Min-jeong (judoka) (born 1988), South Korean judoka
- Kim Min-jung (footballer) (born 1996), South Korean footballer
- Kim Min-jeong (poet) (born 1976), South Korean poet and literary editor
- Kim Min-jeong (field hockey) (born 1997), South Korean field hockey player
- Kim Min-jeong (singer) (born 2001), South Korean singer

== See also ==
- Kim Min-jong (born 1971), South Korean actor and singer
