= Lee Yeong-gwang =

South Korean poet and educator (born 1965)

- Hangul: 이영광
- RR: I Yeonggwang
- MR: I Yŏnggwang

Lee Yeong-gwang (Korean: 이영광, born 1965) is a South Korean poet and educator. He was born in 1965 in Gyeongsangbuk-do. He graduated from Korea University's graduate school. He has won the 8th Nojak Literature Prize in 2008, the 11th Jihoon Prize (Literature Prize) in 2011, and the 11th Midang Literary Award in the same year. He is a poet who depicts life's sadness in elaborate language, but does not dwell in despair, and lyrically shows the image of gaining the will for starting life again. He has been a creative writing professor at Korea University since 2015.

== Life ==
Lee Yeong-gwang is a South Korean poet and educator. He was born in 1965 in Uiseong, Gyeongsangbuk-do, and grew up in Andong. According to him, in 1986, when he went to the Sea of Japan with his friend and was drinking, poetry suddenly came out. He began his literary career with publishing 10 poems including "Bingpok" (빙폭 Glacier Fall) in 1988 on Joongang Literary Journal. He graduated from Korea University in English literature (bachelor's), and he earned a doctorate degree from Korea University in Korean literature with a thesis on So Chong-ju. He serialized his writing on newspapers for a long time, and he has also collected the writing he had serialized into Holim tteolim ulim (홀림 떨림 울림 Possession Vibration Reverberation) (Nanam, 2013). He has won the 8th Nojak Literature Prize in 2008, the 11th Jihoon Prize (Literature Prize) in 2011, and the 11th Midang Literary Award in the same year. He has been a creative writing professor in media at Korea University since 2015. He participated in the 2016 Seoul International Writer's Festival.

== Writing ==
In his first poetry collection, Jikseon wi-eseo tteolda (직선 위에서 떨다 Shivering Atop a Straight Line), Lee Yeong-gwang attempted to turn the agony of youth that endures great pain into literature. His poetry is thick with sadness for old things or ruins. Though this isn't unrelated to his experiences during adolescence, literary critic Hwang Hyeon-san has said that this is "a result of poverty ridden life". According to him, Lee Yeong-gwang feels that today's world lacks something, and that he is conscious of how he is left for himself in this 'age of poverty'. The poet, though he considers the world as an uncertain place, attempts to overcome that and find something certain. In the title piece of the collection, "Jikseon wi-eseo tteolda" (직선 위에서 떨다 Shivering Atop a Straight Line) he writes that he saw "a road so decisive that it saw right through me", and that road is "supporting with all its body a scratched life". This shows that the poet is attempting to find that definite 'road'. In his second poetry collection, Geuneulgwa sagwida (그늘과 사귀다 Making Friends with the Shade), his understanding of death is evident. He examines death, and thereby throws questions on life. He describes funerals and memorial rituals in detail, studying how the lives of the dead and the living overlap. Through this, the poet shows that within the process of funeral rites and the symbolic meaning of traditional life, there is an integration of life and death. The poet's interest on death continued toward the third poetry collection Apeun cheonguk (아픈 천국 The Sick Heaven). However, here his understanding of death became an occasion for the poet to compose his will to live on freely and fully. His most recent poetry collection Namuneun ganda (나무는 간다 The Tree is Going), his interest in social issues is evident. If his past collection was depicted as an occasion for him to look back on life by the way of 'death', Namuneun ganda (나무는 간다 The Tree is Going) is a story of those that have died wrongly due to social injustice. With his unique sensibility, he faces the cruel reality that gives rise to unjust deaths, and fiercely rebukes society filled with contradiction. Despite that, Lee Yeong-gwang's poetry is on another level than simple social criticism. That is because by directly looking at death, he expresses faith for nurturing new hope, placing his work at a higher level of poetry.

== Works ==
=== Poetry collections ===
- Jikseon wi-eseo tteolda (직선 위에서 떨다 Shivering Atop a Straight Line), Changbi, 2003.
- Geuneulgwa sagwida (그늘과 사귀다 Making Friends with the Shade), Random House Korea, 2007.
- Apeun cheonguk (아픈 천국 The Sick Heaven), Changbi, 2010.
- Namuneun ganda (나무는 간다 The Tree is Going), Changbi, 2013.

=== Miscellaneous ===
- Sireumgwa gyeongi (시름과 경이 Anxiety and Wonder), Cheonnyeonui sijak, 2012.
- Holim tteolim ulim (홀림 떨림 울림 Possession Vibration Reverberation) Nanam, 2013.

== Awards ==
- 2008 Nojak Literature Prize
- 2011 Jihoon Prize (Literature Prize)
- 2011 Midang Literary Award
