= Minjung (disambiguation) =

Minjung (민중) is a Korean political term referring to marginalised people of society.

Minjung may also refer to:

- Minjung of Goguryeo (민중, fl. 40s), fourth ruler of Goguryeo
- Min-jung (name) (민정), the tenth-most-common name in South Korea
- Minjung Party (People's Party), a political party in South Korea established in 2017

== See also ==
- Minjung theology
- Minjung art
