= Kim Kwang-kyu =

Kim Kwang-kyu may refer to:

- Kim Kwang-kyu (poet)
- Kim Kwang-kyu (actor)
