= Kwak Hyo-hwan =

South Korean poet (born 1967)

- Born: 1967 (age 58–59); Jeonju, South Korea
- Education: Konkuk University
- Occupation: Poet
- Writing career
- Language: Korean
- Genre: Poetry
- Subject: Korea

Kwak Hyo Hwan (Korean: 곽효환, born 1967) is a South Korean poet. Since his literary debut in 1996, he wrote a number of poems based on his interest in regions north of the Korean Peninsula, including Dandong, China, Tibet, Xinjiang Uyghurs Autonomous Region of China, Siberia, and Baykal. In the early 2000s, he served as the director-general of the Daesan Foundation and planned and organized a variety of events for the globalization of Korean literature.

== Biography ==
Kwak was born in Jeonju, South Jeolla Province, in 1967 but grew up in Seoul. After graduating from college, he worked for four years as a reporter for Yonhap News Agency. He made his literary debut with the publication of "Byeokhwa sogui goyangi 3" (벽화 속의 고양이 3 The Cat in the Mural 3) in Segye Ilbo in 1996, followed by the publication of six poems including "Suraksan" (수락산 Mount Surak) in Sipyeong (시평) in 2002. He served as an editor for Munhaknamoo and Urimunhwa and also as the director-general of the Daesan Foundation.

Kwak planned and organized a variety of events for the globalization of Korean literature. In 2000, the Daesan Foundation hosted the first Seoul International Forum for Literature, which Kwak attended with the South Korean poet Ko Un, American poet Gary Snyder, English novelist Margaret Drabble, and translator Brother Anthony to promote cultural exchange between Korean writers and distinguished writers from around the world. The second forum was held in 2005, the third in 2011, and the fourth in 2017.

In 2003, a Korean literature festival, the first if its kind to be held in Russia, took place was held in Moscow and St. Petersburg, Russia. Co-hosted by Russia's Gorky Institute of World Literature of the Russian Academy of Sciences and the Daesan Foundation. Kwak was joined by South Korean poet Chong Hyon-jong, literary critic Yu Jong-ho, literature scholar Cho Tong-il, Russian novelist Anatoli Kim, and researcher Kim Ryo Ho at the Gorky Institute.

In 2008, the last year of the joint fellowship program for Korean writers, by the Daesan Foundation and the Center for Korean Studies at UC Berkeley, Kwak held a poetry reading as well as discussing future plans for the program; he read a few poems from his first poetry collection Indio yeoin (인디오 여인 The Indio Woman). He visited Mexico to discuss literary translation projects between South Korea and Mexico with Mexican publisher Fondo De Cultura Economica.

Kwak took part in the 2013 World Writers' Festival with other Korean and international poets.

== Writing ==
=== Northern Consciousness ===
Kwak Hyo Hwan's literature focussed on the regions in the north of the Korean Peninsula. He published his research into the "northern consciousness" of modern Korean poets who were born in the northern regions in the early twentieth century, including Kim Dong-hwan, Baek Seok, Yi Yongak, O Chang-hwan, Yu Chi-hwan, and Yi Yuksa, titled Hanguk geundaesiui bukbanguisik (한국 근대시의 북방의식 The Northern Consciousness in Modern Korean Poetry; 2008). He travelled and explored the region, including the Chinese city Dandong, Tibet, Xinjiang, Siberia, and Baykal. Kwak's poetry collections Jidoe eomneun jip (지도에 없는 집 The House Not Found on a Map; 2010), Seulpeumui ppyeodae (슬픔의 뼈대 The Frame of Sorrow; 2014) were created to reflect his experiences.

To Kwak, the concept was not simply geographical regions, as seen in "Baikal saramdeul" (바이칼 사람들 The People of Baykal), the north he described was a warm and hospitable place where human life has been kept in it is original form, before it became has become fragmented and desolate through the modern civilization.

At the same time, the north reminded Kwak of the turbulent history of Korea; the independence movement; forced labor in colonial Korea under the Japanese rule, and the division of the Korean Peninsula, portrayed in "Siberia hoengdanyeolcha 2" (시베리아 횡단열차2 The Trans-Siberian Railroad 2). Kwak explained that the north "is the beginning and the end. Even if you were isolated, oppressed by the powerful, there you could face each other and live in harmony." When asked why he repeatedly used the imagery of the northern regions, he replied, "Our life is in disharmony, as we wish to return to that peaceful place but are unable to. I wanted to express that."

=== Consciousness of the Other ===
Kwak's fourth poetry collection Neoneun (너는 You Are), published in 2018, was described as adding socio-historical imagination to the issue of the formation of relationship between the self and others, which he had previously explored. In the foreword, it explains: "you" is "the other but also us." It is "the beginning and the end" and "the unreachable other inside me." In Neoneun, "you" is expressed in different ways—"you" is Kwak's father, who left for a port city to look for a job and whom young Kwak waited for endlessly ("Madangeul geonneoda" (마당을 건너다 Crossing the Yard)) or a Koryo-saram youth, who has been wandering through Hamgyeong Province, Primorsky Krai, Moscow, and Seoul to make a living ("Naneun Koryo-saramida" (나는 고려 사람이다 I Am Koryo-saram)). In "2014-nyeon yeoreum, Gwanghwamun gwangjangeseo" (2014년 여름, 광화문광장에서 In Summer 2014 at Gwanghwamun Square), Kwak described his search of the foundation dubbed "you" in this time and age when everyone touted themselves, against the backdrop of the Gwanghwamun Square where protests and rallies are held. Kwak attempts to get in touch with "you," or everyone else who is not "me." His poetic work seems to spur interest in "us" as a community rather than the individuals, such as "me" or singular "you."

== Works ==
=== Poetry collections ===
- 《인디오 여인》, 민음사, 2006 / Indio yeoin (The Indio Woman), Minumsa, 2006
- 《지도에 없는 집》, 문학과지성사, 2010 / Jidoe eomneun jip (The House Not Found on a Map), Moonji, 2010
- 《슬픔의 뼈대》, 문학과지성사, 2014 / Seulpeumui ppyeodae (The Frame of Sorrow), Moonji, 2014
- 《너는》, 문학과지성사, 2018 / Neoneun (You Are), Moonji, 2018

=== Research ===
- 《한국 근대시의 북방의식》, 서정시학, 2008 / Hanguk geundaesiui bukbanguisik (The Northern Consciousness in Modern Korean Poetry), Lyric Poetry (서정시학), 2008

=== Co-authorship or Compilations ===
- 《아버지, 그리운 당신》(공편), 서정시학, 2009 / Abeoji, geuriun dangsin (Father, I Miss You) (co-edited), Lyric Poetry, 2009
- 《구보 박태원의 시와 시론》(편), 푸른사상, 2011 / Kubo Park Taewon-ui siwa siron (Poetry and Poetics of Kubo Park Taewon) (edited), Prunsasang, 2011
- 《초판본 이용악 시선》(편), 지식을만드는지식, 2012 / Chopanbon Yi Yong-ak siseon (Selected First-Edition Poems of Yi Yong-ak) (edited), Zmanz Books, 2012
- 《가난한 내가 아름다운 나타샤를 사랑해서》(편), 교보문고, 2012 / Gananhan naega areumdaun Natasha-reul saranghaeseo (The Poor Man That I Am Was in Love With Natasha) (edited), Kyobo Book, 2012
- 《너는 내게 너무 깊이 들어왔다》(편), 교보문고, 2014 / Neoneun naege neomu gipii deureowatda (You Came Too Deep Into My Heart) (edited), Kyobo Book, 2014
- 《이용악 전집》(공편), 소명출판, 2015 / Yi Yong-ak jeonjip (Collected Works of Yi Yong-ak) (co-edited), Somyung Books, 2015
- 《청록집》(편), 교보문고, 2016 / Cheongnokjip (Blue Green Book) (edited), Kyobo Book, 2016
- 《별 헤는 밤》(편), 교보문고, 2017 / Byeol heneun bam (A Starry Night) (edited), Kyobo Book, 2017

== Works in Translation ==
- 고래의 노래/ A Galaxy of Whale Poems, Munhaksasang, 2005
- 서울/포르토프랭스: 바이링귀얼 리뷰 / séoul/port-au-prince: revue bilingue, Verdier Editions, 2015
- 곽효환 시선집 / КУАГ ХЮУХУАНЬ НАЙРАГЧИЙН ШИЛМЭЛ ТҮҮВЭР, Soyombo, 2017

== Awards ==
- Aeji Literary Award (애지문학상, 2013) (for “Supui jeonggeojang” (숲의 정거장 A Bus Stop in the Forest))
- Kim Geon-il Literary Award (김건일문학상, 2016) (for Seulpeumui ppyeodae)
- Pyeon-un Literature Prize (편운문학상, 2015) (for Seulpeumui ppyeodae)
- Yushim Literature Prize (2016) (for "Madangeul geonneoda")
- Kim Daljin Literature Prize (2019) (for Neoneun)

== Sources ==
[Daesan Foundation] http://www.daesan.or.kr/ (2019.08.01. 10:00(UTC +9:00)) [Seoul International Forum for Literature] 서울국제문학포럼 http://seoulforum.org/2017/intro.html?uid=4 (2019.08.01. 10:00(UTC +9:00))
