= Kim Kyunghu =

South Korean poet (born 1971)

Kim Kyunghu (born 1971) is a South Korean poet.

== Life ==
Kim Kyunghu was born in 1971 in Seoul. She graduated from Ewha Woman's University with a degree in German Literature and Language. Later she earned a doctorate in creative writing from Myongji University's Graduate School. She began her career in 1998 with the publisher Hyundae Munhak, and published poetry collections Geunal Mali dolaoji anatda (그날 말이 돌아오지 않았다 The Horse Did Not Return That Day), and Yeoldu gyeobui jajeong (열두 겹의 자정 Twelve Layers of Midnight). She won the 61st Hyundae Literary Award in 2016.

== Writing ==
Kim Kyunghu's poetry has attracted attention for simply showing a way of life, where all of the world's violence is endured, yet the meaning of life is not given up on until the end. Her first poetry collection Geunal Mali dolaoji anatda (그날 말이 돌아오지 않았다 The Horse Did Not Return That Day) has shown the way of poetry that does not compromise with the violent reality, using honest words that show the innermost side of a wretched life, instead of words of false reconciliation. Her poetry suggests how one could endure the violence of reality, while also seeking a better life, or another reality. Her second poetry collection, Yeoldu gyeobui jajeong (열두 겹의 자정 Twelve Layers of Midnight) records the groans of enforced silence of those who do not even have the opportunity to speak out in a violent world. Such silence and groaning comes when the poetry's subject, while withstanding the violence of the world, and not giving up on the possibility of entering reality, loses the ability to act on such a possibility. This implies that as the subject grows from a child to an adult, the violence of the world becomes greater. From such a perspective, the pain in the world of Kim Kyunghu's poetry is not a metaphor, but closer to reality. On her poetry that has such depth, poet Kim Ki-taek has written in his commentary for the Contemporary Literature (Hyundae Munhak) Award the following. "Her poetry circulates and activates delicate emotions and feelings, giving a strangely great amount of joy. What is new in her poetry is not what has been found by resisting, rejecting, and throwing away what is old, but instead it is what has been found by rediscovering what is already abundant yet unseen in the old, and finding the true value and beauty of it, allowing us to feel it vividly."

== Works ==
=== Poetry collections ===
- Geunal Mali dolaoji anatda (그날 말이 돌아오지 않았다 The Horse Did Not Return That Day), Minumsa, 2001.
- Yeoldu gyeobui jajeong (열두 겹의 자정 Twelve Layers of Midnight), Munhakdongne, 2012.

=== Children's books ===
- Salatni? Jukeotni? Salatda! (살았니? 죽었니? 살았다! Are You Alive? Dead? You're Alive!), Gilbut Kid, 2014.
- Goete-ui jeolmeun bereuteoui seulpeum (괴테의 젊은 베르터의 슬픔 Goethe's The Sorrows of Young Werther), Woongjin Media, 2012.

== Awards ==
- 61st Hyundae Literary Award (2016)
