= Kim Sun-woo =

Kim Sun-woo may refer to:

- Sun-woo Kim (born 1977), South Korean baseball player
- Kim Sun-woo (footballer, born 1983), South Korean football forward (K League 1)
- Kim Sun-woo (footballer, born 1993), South Korean football midfielder (K League 1)
- Kim Sun-woo (pentathlete) (born 1996), South Korean modern pentathlete

== See also ==
- Kim Seon-wu, poet
