= Sowol Poetry Prize =

South Korean literary award

The Sowol Poetry Prize (Korean: 소월시문학상) is one of the most prestigious literary awards in South Korea. Established by the publishing company Moonhaksasangsa (문학사상사) in 1986, the prize aims to commemorate the soul of the poetry of Kim Sowol.

The awardees are selected through a two-round process. During the first round various published poems are chosen and evaluated by selected university professors, poets, literary critics, and editors-in-chief of Literature & Thought (문학사상, the literary magazine published by Moonhaksasangsa); readers of the magazine are also polled on their opinions. The selected entries then progress to the second round, in which ten works of poetry are ultimately chosen through rigorous discussion by the judges; the author of the winning poem receives the grand prize, while the remaining nine poems are listed as runners-up. Every year Moonhaksasangsa publishes a collection of that year's winning poems.

== Winners ==
List of recipients and the poem titles in chronological order.

| Prize Year | Title | Author |
|---|---|---|
| 1986 | "The Bowl 1" (그릇 1) | O Seyeong |
| 1987 | "The Forest and Birds of Our Nation" (우리 나라의 숲과 새들) | Song Sugwon |
| 1988 | "At the Imjin River" (임진강에서) | Jeong Ho-seung |
| 1989 | "A Telltale Song" (숨길 수 없는 노래) | Yi Seongbok |
| 1990 | "Roaming Metonymy" (떠도는 환유) | Kim Seunghui |
| 1991 | "Mountaintop Graveyard" (산정묘지(山頂墓地)) | Jo Jeonggwon |
| 1992 | "Ascending Hwaum" (화엄에 오르다) | Kim Myeongin |
| 1993 | "A Lonely Painful Regret" (뼈저린 후회) | Hwang Ji-u |
| 1994 | "For the Sake of Altitude" (고도를 위하여) | Im Yeongjo |
| 1995 | "Fastening Buttons" (단추를 채우면서) | Cheon Yanghui |
| 1996 | "On Seeing a Tall Man" (키 큰 남자를 보면) | Mun Jeonghui |
| 1997 | "Why People Do Not Know" (사람들은 왜 모를까) | Kim Yongtaek |
| 1998 | "Waiting for a Whale" (고래를 기다리며) | An Dohyeon |
| 1999 | "By Love, I" (사랑으로 나는) | Kim Jeongran |
| 2000 | "A Well-Ripened Apple" (잘 익은 사과) | Kim Hyesoon |
| 2001 | "On the Road of Camellia Woods of Baekryeon Temple" (백련사 동백숲길에서) | Go Jaejong |
| 2002 | "Autumns of Earth" (지구의 가을) | Yi Munjae |
| 2003 | "Around, Mom's Doorae Table" (둥근, 어머니의 두레밥상) | Jeong Ilgeun |
| 2004 | "On the Side of Amur River" (아무르 강가에서) | Park Jeong-dae |
| 2005 | "The Pupil of Time" (시간의 동공) | Pak Jutaek |
| 2006 | "Around That Time" (그맘때에는) | Mun Tae-jun |
| 2007 | "In the Room Where Island Seop Is Seen" (섶섬이 보이는 방) | Na Huideok |
| 2008 | "A Great Grand Sleep" (크나큰 잠) | Jeong Kkeutbyeol |
| 2009 | "Except the Bright Beat of My Heart" (가슴의 환한 고동 외에는) | Pak Hyeongjun |
| 2010 | "In Air" (공중) | Song Jaehak |
| 2011 | "A Thousand Year Under the Peach Blossoms" (복사꽃 아래 천년) | Bae Hanbong |
| 2012 | "A Meal On the Road" (길 위의 식사) | Lee Jaemoo |
| 2013 | "Bukcheon-Crow" (북천-까마귀) | Yoo Hongjoon |
