= Kwon Hyeok-ung =

South Korean poet, literary critic, and professor

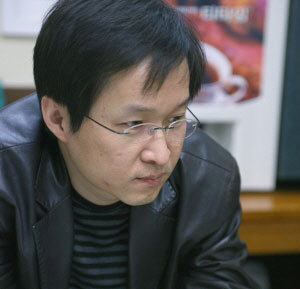
- Occupation: Writer
- Writing career
- Genre: Poetry

Kwon Hyeok-ung (Hangul 권혁웅; born 1967) is a South Korean poet, literary critic, and professor. He was born in Chungju, South Korea and studied Korean literature at Korea University, where he also received his doctoral degree. He has been teaching creative writing at Hanyang Women's University since 2003.

== Life ==
Kwon Hyeok-ung was born in Chungju, South Korea. He began his literary career when he won the Joongang Ilbo New Writer's Contest in 1996 for criticism and the Munye Joongang Literary Award in 1997 for poetry. As a critic, he was closely involved in a heated controversy over South Korean Futurist literature in the mid-2000s. Experimental works by young South Korean poets in that decade were attracting criticism for their abstruseness, but Kwon defended them arguing that they simply used "a different style of communication" from conventional poetry. He was in fact the first one to call them "Futurist" poetry, and despite the controversy surrounding the subject, the name stuck. It became an important term to explain South Korean poetry in the 2000s and sparked various other discussions on new poetics.

Kwon's own poetry, however, was not the kind of work he praised as a critic. He preferred to write lyrical and romantic poetry. He earned a number of accolades for his work, including the 6th Modern Poetry Coterie Award in 2000, the 4th Yushim Award for Best Criticism in 2006, the 2nd Society of Korean Poets Award for Emerging Poets in 2006, the 15th Contemporary Poetry Award in 2010, and the 12th Midang Literary Award in 2012. He served on the editorial board of literary journals Munye Joongang and Hyeondaesihak. He currently teaches creative writing at Hanyang Women's University.

== Writing ==
Kwon Hyeok-ung's poetry has a lyricism that subtly balances emotion with logic. His first poetry collection Hwanggeumnamu areseo (황금나무 아래서 Beneath the Golden Tree) (2001) observes the interior and exterior of objects. His second collection Majingga gyebohak (마징가 계보학 A Genealogy of Mazinger) (2005) nostalgically portrays the hardships of the 1970s and 80s in South Korea by alluding to comic books, erotica, and other cultural memes that were popular among the lower middle class during that time. Geu eolgure ipsureul daeda (그 얼굴에 입술을 대다 I Pressed My Lips on That Face) (2007) is a collection of love poems set in a fantastical universe, featuring mythical creatures from around the world such as centaurs, werewolves, unicorns, and jiangshi. Kwon captures everyday scenes using different motifs for each collection.

From his fourth collection Somundeul (소문들 Rumors), his poems start taking on a more subversive character. In particular, they advocate a type of semantics where signifiers resist and gain independence from the "tyranny" of meaning, explore the meaning of resisting meaning, and seek a counterpower to cause power to implode. Such satirical poetry allowed him to perceive the world in a new light and experience the constant tension between language and reality.

From parodies and love poems through political satires to poems about everyday life, Kwon's poems have diversified in their sensibility and expression. Literary critic Shin Hyeong-cheol argues that Kwon is "an intelligent poet" who takes easy-to-miss "people and objects and turns them into protagonists of his stories, then casually nudges them toward us." Kwon has also been noted for his lyricism, experimental style, ability to create images from mundane subjects, imagination, and extensive knowledge of poetry.

== Works ==
=== Poetry collections ===
1. 『마징가 계보학』(창비, 2005) { A Genealogy of Mazinger. Changbi, 2005. }

2. 『그 얼굴에 입술을 대다』(민음사, 2007) { I Pressed My Lips on That Face. Minumsa, 2007. }

3. 『소문들』(문학과지성사, 2010) { Rumors. Moonji, 2010. }

4. 『애인은 토막난 순대처럼 운다』(창비, 2013) { The Lover Wails Like a Chopped up Sausage. Changbi, 2013. }

=== Essay collections ===
1. 『태초에 사랑이 있었다』(문학동네, 2005) { In the Beginning There Was Love. Munhakdongne, 2005. }

2. 『두근두근』(랜덤하우스코리아, 2008) { Pitapat. Random House Korea, 2008. }

3. 『몬스터 멜랑콜리아』(민음사, 2011) { Monster Melancholia. Minumsa, 2011. }

4. 『당신을 읽는 시간』(문예중앙, 2012) { Time to Read You. Moonye Joongang, 2012. }

5. 『꼬리치는 당신』(마음산책, 2013) { You're Flirty. Maumsanchaek, 2013. }

6. 『미주알 고주알』(난다, 2014) { Every Last Detail. Nanda Books, 2014. }

7. 『생각하는 연필』(난다, 2014) { Thinking Pencil. Nanda Books, 2014. }

8. 『외롭지 않은 말』(마음산책, 2016) { Unlonely Words. Maumsanchaek, 2016. }

=== Criticism ===
1. 『미래파』(문학과지성사, 2005) { Futurism. Moonji, 2005. }

2. 『시론』(문학동네, 2010) { Poetics. Munhakdongne, 2010. }

3. 『입술에 묻은 이름』(문학동네, 2012) { The Name Stained on Your Lips. Munhakdongne, 2012. }

4. 『시적 언어의 기하학』(새미, 2013) { The Geometry of Poetic Language. Saemi, 2013. }

=== Works in translation ===
1. 現代詩手帖 2007年 8月号 (Japanese)

== Awards ==
1. 2000: 6th Modern Poetry Coterie Award

2. 2005: 3rd Aeji Literary Award for Best Criticism

3. 2006: 4th Yushim Award for Best Criticism

4. 2006: 2nd Society of Korean Poets Award for Emerging Poets

5. 2010: 15th Contemporary Poetry Award

6. 2012: 12th Midang Literary Award
