= Kim Seonu =

South Korean feminist poet (born 1970)

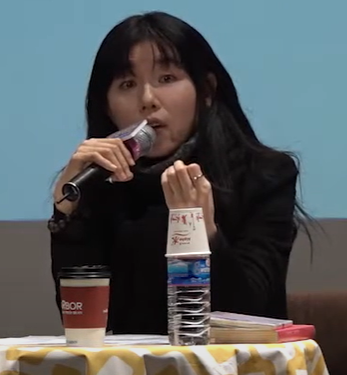
- Kim Seonu in 2018.
- Born: 1970 (age 55–56)
- Writing career
- Language: Korean
- Period: Modern

Korean name
- Hangul: 김선우
- Hanja: 金宣佑
- RR: Gim Seonu
- MR: Kim Sŏnu

Kim Seonu (Korean: 김선우, born 1970) is a South Korean feminist poet.

== Life ==
Kim Seonu was born in 1970 in Gangneung, South Korea, and is considered part of the new "feminist" wave of Korean poetry. Kim is also known internationally, having been a poet-in-residence at the New Zealand Centre for Literary Translation at Victoria University, Wellington, in September and October 2013.

== Career ==
According to the poet Na Huideok, Kim Seonu's poetry is filled with "bashful yet intense sensuality reminiscent of moist flower petals," and "her femininity emanates [...] abundance as that of embryonic fluid." The women in her poetry are "embryos, mothers and midwives all at once." The image of women as bountiful, life-giving and life-embracing entities dominates her first volume of poetry If My Tongue Refuses To Be Locked Up in My Mouth (내 혀가 입 속에 갇혀 있길 거부한다면, 2000). The poet's celebration of the female body is often accompanied by her revulsion of male oppression. In the title poem, the poet visualizes the feminine desire for freedom from male oppression in a series of unsettling imageries such as "a skull of a baby hanging from its mother's neck," and "a gush of beheaded camellias." The protagonist is forced to sew strips of new skin onto a monster that grows bigger and bigger. Her attempt to kill him ultimately fails because her "good tongue is obsequiously locked up in his mouth."

Her second volume of poetry, Sleeping under the Peach Blossoms (도화 아래 잠들다, 2003), reveals the force of nature in its primeval state through the physicality of women's body and uniquely feminine functions of reproduction. In "A Bald Mountain," it is women's sexuality and sexual desires that find their expression in nature: "cloud children" pucker their lips toward the "bright nipples of flowers," and "the tongue of the wind" passes over the waist of the mountain and lifts up the eulalia seeds while "licking the deep valley." The winter grass bends down to have sex in various positions and the mountain itself is "lying with its legs open towards the shadow."

== Works ==
=== Works in Korean (partial) ===
- If My Tongue Refuses To Be Locked Up in My Mouth (내 혀가 입 속에 갇혀 있길 거부한다면, 2000)
- When the Moon Opens Under the Sea (물 밑에 달이 열릴 때, 2002)
- Sleeping Under the Peach Blossoms (도화 아래 잠들다, 2003)
- Princess Bari (바리공주, 2003)
- Kim Seonu's Personal Belongings (김선우의 사물들, 2005)
- Who Is That Sleeping in My Body? (내 몸속에 잠든 이 누구신가, 2007)
- Kisses Like Sugar in My Mouth (내 입에 들어온 설탕 같은 키스들, 2007)
- Who Was Lying Down on That Rice Platter Alongside Us? (우리말고 또 누가 이 밥그릇에 누웠을까, 2007)

=== Works in translation ===
- Selected poems in The Colors of Dawn: Twentieth Century Korean Poetry (University of Hawaiʻi Press, 2015) - ed. Frank Stewart, Brother Anthony, Chung Eun-Gwi ISBN 978-0-824-86622-8
- If My Tongue Refuses To Remain in My Mouth (Autumn Hill Books, 2018) - translated by Christopher Merrill and Kim Won-Chung ISBN 978-0-998-74001-0
