= Lee Moon-jae =

South Korean poet and professor (born 1959)

Lee Moon-jae (born September 22, 1959) is a South Korean poet and professor. He is described as a poet who expresses "environmental imagination" in his literature. He also critiques contemporary literature, and currently writes a column in the Kyunghyang Shinmun. He is a creative writing professor at Kyung Hee University.

== Life ==
Lee is a South Korean poet and professor. He is described as a poet who expresses "environmental imagination" in his literature. He also critiques contemporary literature, and currently writes a column in the Kyunghyang Shinmun. He was born in Gimpo, Gyeonggi-do (currently Seo District, Incheon), and graduated from Kyung Hee University in Korean Literature. He began his literary career in 1982 while still a university student by publishing Uri saldeon yetjib jibung (우리 살던 옛집 지붕 Our Old Home's Roof) on the 4th issue of Siundong. He has published poetry collections, Ne jeojeun gudu beoseo hae-ege boyeojul ttae(내 젖은 구두 벗어 해에게 보여줄 때 When I Take Off My Wet Shoe and Show It to the Sun), 'Sanchaeksipyeon', Maeumui oji (마음의 오지 The Backwoods of the Mind), and essay collections Babbeun geosi ge-eureun geosida (바쁜 것이 게으른 것이다 Busy is Lazy), Naega mannan siwa si-in (내가 만난 시와 시인 The Poems and Poets I've Met). Previously he worked as an adjunct professor in creative writing at Chugye University for the Arts, and as a news director at Sisa journal. Currently he is the executive editor at Munhakdongne, and editor at the Green Review. He has been awarded the Kimdaljin Literature Prize, the Nojak Literature Prize, the Poetry and Poetics Award, and the Sowol Poetry Award.

== Writing ==
Lee is a poet who drew an image of young souls adrift in the real world, with flexible poetic imagination. Early in his career, his poetry described the life of a youth who experiences discord with the world, and aimlessly drifts. His early works reflect the poet's own experiences. In his childhood he moved often, did not have a comfortable life, and was raised under a strict father. Only through daydreaming he could escape such realities. His early poetry collections heavily reflect such childhood experiences. In his early works, "the road" is an important image. It gives a glimpse of the poet's own experiences of having had to move often, and ultimately it reflects the poet's desire to imagine an "uncharted road" and newly wander. At the time, He was known as a poet that represents the minds of the young generation that were worried and uncertain of their future, and desired to wander.

Meanwhile, after Maeumui oji (마음의 오지 The Backwoods of the Mind), his poetry has been praised as expressing environmental imagination. Maeumui oji deals with agriculture, and criticizes the anthropocentricism that has ruined human history. In Jegukhotel (제국호텔 Imperial Hotel), he states that today's world is a "Jeguk" (empire). To resist through literature against such dystopia, he dug into his memories for things that awakened his emotions.

According to the cited source, Lee's poetry has remained consistent in its subject matter while continuing to use metaphorical imagery. The source describes his work as addressing emotional experience and themes related to contemporary society through poetic language.

== Works ==
- Ne jeojeun gudu beoseo hae-ege boyeojul ttae (내 젖은 구두 벗어 해에게 보여줄 때 When I Take Off My Wet Shoe and Show It to the Sun)
- Maeumui oji (마음의 오지 The Backwoods of the Mind)
- Saemmuli badaro (샘물이 바다로 The Spring Going to the Ocean), Munhak21, 1999.
- Mirinae eondeokeseo (미리내 언덕에서 From Mirinae Hill), Pulipmunhak, 2003.
- Jegukhotel (제국호텔 Imperial Hotel), Munhakdongne, 2004.
- Byeolbit ssotajineun gonggan (별빛 쏟아지는 공간 Where Starlight Pours In), Pulipmunhak, 2005.
- Jigeum yeogiga maen ap (지금 여기가 맨 앞 Here Right Now is the Very Front), Munhakdongne, 2014.

== Awards ==
- 1995 5th Kimdaljin Literature Prize
- 1999 4th Poetry and Poetics Award for Young Poets
- 2002 17th Sowol Poetry Prize
- 2005 5th Ji Hoon Literature Award
- 2007 7th Nojak Literature Prize
