= Moon In-soo =

South Korean poet (1945–2021)

- Hangul: 문인수
- Hanja: 文寅洙
- RR: Mun Insu
- MR: Mun Insu

Moon In-soo (Korean: 문인수; 2 June 1945 – 7 June 2021) was a South Korean poet.

== Life ==
Moon was born in June 1945 in Seongju County, North Gyeongsang Province.

Moon began his literary career in 1985 when he published Neungsubeodeul (능수버들 A Weeping Willow) in Shimsang.

Moon won the 14th Daegu Literary Award in 1996.

== Awards ==
- 1996 14th Daegu Literary Award
- 2000 11th Kim Daljin Literary Prize
- 2003 3rd Nojak Literature Prize
- 2006 11th Poetry and Poetics Award
- 2007 10th Korea Catholic Literature Award for Poetry
- 2007 7th Midang Literary Award
- 2007 17th Pyeon-un Literature Award
- 2016 9th Mogwol Literature Prize
