= White Pine Press =

American, nonprofit, literary press

- Founded: 1973
- Founder: Dennis Maloney
- Country of origin: United States
- Headquarters location: Buffalo, New York
- Distribution: Consortium Book Sales & Distribution
- Publication types: Books
- Official website: www.whitepine.org

White Pine Press is an American, nonprofit, literary press located in Buffalo, New York, publishing poetry, fiction, essays, and world literature in translation. The press was founded by poet, translator, editor and publisher Dennis Maloney in 1973.

Notable authors published by White Pine Press include James Wright, Jacqueline Johnson, Robert Bly, William Matthews, Sonia Sanchez, Christopher Merrill, David St. John, Marjorie Agosín, Matsuo Bashō, Pablo Neruda, and Peter Johnson.

White Pine Press titles have been reviewed in venues including The New York Times, Publishers Weekly, Library Journal, Booklist, and many others.

The press has received funding from the National Endowment for the Arts, the New York State Council on the Arts, private foundations including the Lila-Wallace Foundation, and individuals. White Pine Press titles are distributed by Consortium Book Sales & Distribution. Awards given by the press include the White Pine Press Poetry Prize.
