= Pak Hyeongjun =

South Korean poet and university professor

- Born: 1966 (age 59–60); Jeongeup, North Jeolla Province
- Writing career
- Language: Korean

Korean name
- Hangul: 박형준
- Hanja: 朴瑩浚
- RR: Bak Hyeongjun
- MR: Pak Hyŏngjun

Pak Hyeongjun (Korean: 박형준, born 1966) is a South Korean poet and university professor.

== Life ==
Pak Hyeongjun was born in 1966 in Jeongeup, South Korea. He graduated from the Seoul Institute of the Arts with a degree in creative writing, then attended Myongji University for graduate school, where he earned his Master's degree and doctorate. While still relatively young Pak Hyeongjun moved from his countryside hometown of Jeongeup to Incheon, South Korea's third-most populated city after Seoul and Busan. Pak confessed that this experience inspired him to begin writing poetry, saying that, while he was living in Incheon, he "felt often as if I was stagnant even though I was endlessly drifting. But I think that was what drove me to write poetry."

At Seoul Institute of the Arts, Pak Hyeongjun studied under the well-known poets Oh Kyu-won and Choe Ha-rin. Pak began his literary career when his poem "The Strength of Furniture" (가구의 힘) won the Korea Times New Writer's Award in 1991. He has also received the Dream and Poetry Literary Award (1996), the Dongsuh Literary Award (2002), the Contemporary Poetics Award (2005), the Sowol Poetry Prize (2009), and the Yuksa Poetry Award (2012). In 2014 he began working as a professor of creative writing at Dongguk University.

== Writing ==
Pak Hyeongjun's work has been described as "reinterpreting the tradition of Korean lyric poetry in the most modern way." His first poetry collection, I Would Now Like To Talk About the Disappearance (나는 이제 소멸에 대해서 이야기하련다, 1994), was very well received by critics. Much of his poetry focuses on time, on the past, present, and future, and on memory and loss of memory. His more recent poetry collection, The Burned House (불탄 집, 2013), further expanded upon these topics.

== Works ==
=== Poetry collections ===
- I Would Now Like To Talk About the Disappearance (나는 이제 소멸에 대해서 이야기하련다, 1994)
- A Mirror with a Scent of Bread (빵냄새를 풍기는 거울, 1997)
- The Leaves Have Blossomed into the Water (물속까지 잎사귀가 피어 있다, 2002)
- Dance (춤, 2005)
- I Cried at Every Thought of It (생각날 때마다 울었다, 2011)
- The Burned House (불탄 집, 2013)

=== Essay collections ===
- The Pattern of the Evening (저녁의 무늬, 2003)
- Hungry for Beauty (아름다움에 허기지다, 2007)
- A Poem for You (당신에게 시, 2013)
- The Note of Silence (침묵의 음, 2013)

== Awards ==
- 1996 1st Dream and Poetry Literary Award
- 2002 15th Dongsuh Literary Award
- 2005 10th Contemporary Poetics Award
- 2009 24th Sowol Poetry Prize
- 2012 9th Yuksa Poetry Award
