= Kim Yongtaek =

South Korean poet (born 1948)

- Born: September 28, 1948 (age 77); Imsil, Jeollabuk-do, South Korea
- Writing career
- Language: Korean
- Notable awards: See here

Korean name
- Hangul: 김용택
- Hanja: 金龍澤
- RR: Gim Yongtaek
- MR: Kim Yongt'aek

Kim Yongtaek (Korean: 김용택; born 28 September 1948) is a South Korean poet.

== Life ==
Kim Yongtaek was born on 28 September 1948, in Imsil, Jeollabuk-do, South Korea. Kim graduated from Sunchang Agricultural High School, and has worked as a teacher at the Imsil Tokchi Elementary School. and at Woonam Elementary School. Kim made his official literary debut in 1982 when "Seomjingang River I" (Seomjingang I) and seven other poems were included in Undying Flame (Kkeojiji anneun hwaetbullo)a book of poetry with collected works by twenty-one prominent poets, published by Creation and Criticism.

== Work ==
Kim's work takes as its point of departure that which is forgotten in the bustle of modern life - the countryside, a leaf of grass, the smell of one's mother's hair. Kim's affectionate and delicate treatment of the everyday affairs of people living in the countryside offered urban dwellers an unadulterated account of rural farming communities. Underlying the poet's tender poetic sensibility is a stern voice of censure. In "Beat the Drums of Protest" (Madangeun bittureojyeosseodo jangguneun baro chija), for example, the poet offers a powerful disapprobation of city politicians and government policymakers who distort and pervert reports on the actual conditions confronting farmers in the countryside.

Underlying Kim's poetic undertaking is the poet's candid desire to provide a sense of dignity to the rural community. This approach, however, has rendered the poet vulnerable to criticism as anachronistic and incapable of offering a solution to the harsh realities of modern society. Kim's desire for community, however, possesses a straightforward quality otherwise lacking in the sometimes convoluted theories of modernity. Kim's stance affirms the spirit of the people, whom he believes derive their identity and dignity from a long history of agrarian life. The robust critical spirit of his poetry derives from his use of the Jeolla-do dialect in poetic forms such as Gasa, Taryeong, and Pansori. This combined use of dialect, proverbs, and colloquialisms strengthens the sense of rural community in Kim's poetry. The use of traditional rhythms, furthermore, endows Kim's poetry with the power to engender tension, rage, and laughter.

Kim has won several awards in 1986 the Kim Su-yeong Literature Award, in 1997 the Sowol Poetry Prize, in 2002 the 소충사선문화상 Award and in 2012 the 윤동주 문학대상 Award.

== Works in Korean (Partial) ==
- Seomjingang River (Seomjingang, 1985)
- A Clear Day (1986)
- Sister, the Day is Fading (1988)
- The Road to Flower Mountain (1988)
- Longing for a Flower Letter (1989)
- Your Daring Love (1993)
- However Crooked the Stage, Let's Play the Drum Right (1996)

== Awards ==
- Kim Suyeong Literary Award (1986)
- Sowol Poetry Prize (1997)
- The 소충사선문화상 Award (2002)
- The 윤동주 문학대상 Award (2012)
