= Song Jaehak =

South Korean poet and dentist (born 1955)

Song Jaehak (Korean: 송재학; born 1955) is a South Korean poet and dentist.

== Biography ==
Song Jaehak was born in Yeongcheon, South Korea in 1955. He studied dentistry at Kyungpook National University and currently works as a dentist in Daegu. He began writing in his teens when he joined a literary club at his middle school and high school. He continued to write and debuted as a poet when the journal World Literature published his poem Eodueun naljjareul seucheoseo (어두운 날짜를 스쳐서 Brushing Past the Dark Days) in 1986. Song's poetry was noted for its emphasis on thought over sentiment. It combined clinical observations of objects and the world with the subjectivity of imagination. He published his first poetry collection Eoreum sijip (얼음시집 Ice Poetry Collection) in 1988, followed by Pureunbitgwa ssauda (푸른빛과 싸우다 Fighting Blue Light) in 1994, Geuga nae ulgureul manjine (그가 내 얼굴을 만지네 He's Touching My Face) in 1997, Gieokdeul (기억들 Memories) in 2001, Jinheukeolgul (진흙얼굴 Mud Face) in 2005, Naeganchereul eotda (내간체를 얻다 I've Acquired the Language of Women) in 2011, Naljjadeul (날짜들 Dates) in 2013, and Geomeunsaek (검은색 Black) in 2015. He is the winner of several accolades, including the Kim Daljin Literature Prize, Pyeon-un Literature Award, and Jeon Bonggeon Literary Award.

== Writing ==
Song's poetry is known for appealing to the senses, especially by use of imagery and color. Eoreum sijip (얼음시집 Ice Poetry Collection) describes the anguish of worldly relationships and the process of overcoming it. His subsequent poems are a continuation of that theme and explore the essence of life in a measured tone. Following his third poetry collection Geuga nae ulgureul manjine (그가 내 얼굴을 만지네 He's Touching My Face), which offers a unique interpretation of color and a sympathetic portrayal of everyday life, Song begins to use more compact language to express his thoughts and intuitions. The judges of the Yi Sang Poetry Award note that Song makes effective use of "synesthesia triggered by visual cues" and that "his symbols are not rhetoric but shed light on truth," which is why his poetry can be said to "transcend the contradictions of Western modernism." In addition, literary critic Lee Gwang-ho observes that Song's poetry brings together bodily senses with the beauty of landscapes, describing him as "a poet who finds passages of the body in images." In his 2015 poetry collection, Geomeunsaek (검은색 Black), Song probes the nature of the world through the color black, which he uses to represent death.

== Works ==
=== Poetry collections ===
- 『얼음시집』(문학과지성사, 1988) { Ice Poetry Collection. Moonji, 1988. }
- 『살레시오네 집』(세계사, 1992) { Salesius' House. Segyesa, 1992. }
- 『푸른빛과 싸우다』(문학과지성사, 1994) { Fighting Blue Light. Moonji, 1994. }
- 『그가 내 얼굴을 만지네』(민음사, 1996) { He's Touching My Face. Minumsa, 1996. }
- 『기억들』(세계사, 2001) { Memories. Segyesa, 2001. }
- 『진흙얼굴』(문예중앙, 2005) { Mud Face. Munye Joongang, 2005. }
- 『내간체를 얻다』(문학동네, 2011) { I've Acquired the Language of Women. Munhakdongne, 2011. }
- 『날짜들』(서정시학, 2013) { Dates. Lyric Poetry and Poetics, 2013. }
- 『검은색』(문학과지성사, 2015) { Black. Moonji, 2015. }

=== Essay collections ===
- 『풍경의 비밀』(랜덤하우스코리아, 2006) { The Secret of Scenery. Random House Korea, 2006. }
- 『삶과 꿈의 길, 실크로드』(아침책상, 2013) { Silk Road: The Road of Life and Dreams. Achim Chaeksang, 2013. }

=== Works in Translation ===
- 舟 : 2009 秋 (Japanese)
- PO: 2010 Autumn (Japanese)

== Awards ==
- 1994: 5th Kim Daljin Literature Prize
- 2010: 25th Sowol Poetry Award
- 2011: 25th Geumbok Culture Award (literature category)
- 2012: 5th Yi Sang Poetry Award
- 2014: 24th Pyeon-un Literature Award
- 2016: 2nd Jeon Bonggeon Literary Award.
