= Jeong Kkeutbyeol =

South Korean poet (born 1964)

- Born: 1964 (age 61–62); Naju, South Jeolla Province
- Citizenship: South Korean
- Education: Ewha Womans University
- Occupations: Poet, Essayist
- Writing career
- Language: Korean

Korean name
- Hangul: 정끝별
- Hanja: 鄭끝별
- RR: Jeong Kkeutbyeol
- MR: Chŏng Kkŭtpyŏl

Jeong Kkeutbyeol (Korean: 정끝별; born 1964) is a South Korean poet, literary critic, and professor. She studied Korean literature at Ewha Womans University and graduated with a Master's degree. Along with numerous volumes of poetry, Jeong has published several collections of critical essays, including The Poetics of Parody (패러디 시학, 1997) and The Language of Poetry Has a Thousand Tongues (천 개의 혀를 가진 시의 언어, 1999).

== Life ==
Jeong Kkeutbyeol was born in Naju, South Korea in 1964. In 1983 she graduated from Myeongji Girls' High School and enrolled in Ewha Womans University, graduating with a degree in Korean Language and Literature in 1987, then going on to earn her Master's and Doctorate degrees from the same university in 1989 and 1994, respectively.

Since 2002 Jeong Kkeutbyeol has variously served as a researcher at the Society of Ewha Korean Language and Literature, an adjunct professor in the Creative Writing department of Chugye University for the Arts, an honorary professor at the Korean Language and Literature department at her alma mater, and an assistant professor in the Practical Language and Literature department of Open Cyber University. In 2004 she was awarded the Yushim Award by the Society for the Promotion and Practice of Manhae's Thoughts. She won the Sowol Poetry Prize in 2008 for her poem "Vast Sleep" (크나큰 잠).

In 2014 Jeong was appointed as a professor of Korean language and literature at both Ewha Womans University and Myongji University, where she currently works. She also participated in the 2015 East Asia Literature Forum.

== Writing ==
Jeong Kkeutbyeol's literary debut was in 1988, when her poem "Sea of Calais" (칼레의 바다) was selected for publication in the literary journal Monthly Literature and Thought. A year later, in 1989, her critical essay "A Cold Parodist's Despair and Inquiry" (서늘한 패로디스트의 절망과 모색) won The Dong-A Ilbo New Writer's Contest.

Her first collection of poetry, My Life, a Birch Tree (자작나무 내 인생, 1996) was highly regarded by critics and fellow writers alike. Jeong's other poetry collections include White Book (흰책, 2000), 180 Thousand Years and the Color Peach (삼천갑자 복사빛, 2005), Bursting (와락, 2008), and Subject Markers, Topic Markers (은는이가, 2014). She has also published several collections of critical and literary essays, most notably The Poetics of Parody (패러디 시학, 1997), which systematically discusses theories on parody, analyzing them in the context of contemporary Korean poetry. Another of her essay collections, The Language of Poetry Has a Thousand Tongues (천 개의 혀를 가진 시의 언어, 1999), provides an open-minded approach to literary criticism, focusing on the infinite linguistic possibilities of poetry.

Jeong's poems are known for their rich imagery and use of language, particularly in regards to their descriptions of nature, their linguistic creativity, and their use of poetic devices. Jeong's poetry typically explores the linguistic details of the Korean language, such as in her collection Subject Markers, Topic Markers (은는이가, 2014), whose title refers to the main four nominative case markers in Korean.

== Works ==
=== Works in Korean ===
==== Poetry collections ====
- My Life, a Birch Tree (자작나무 내 인생, 1996)
- White Book (흰책, 2000)
- 180 Thousand Years and the Color Peach (삼천갑자복사빛, 2005)
- Bursting (와락, 2008)
- Subject Markers, Topic Markers (은는이가, 2014)

==== Research and critical essays ====
- The Poetics of Parody (패러디 시학, 1997)
- The Language of Poetry Has a Thousand Tongues (천 개의 혀를 가진 시의 언어, 1999)
- The Poetics of Pi (파이의 시학, 2010)

=== Works in translation ===
- Selected poems in A Galaxy Of Whale Poems: Poems by 50 Korean Poets
- "Trees Standing at the Edge"
