= Song Chanho =

South Korean poet

- Born: 1959 (age 66–67); Boeun County, North Chungcheong Province, South Korea
- Education: Kyungpook National University
- Occupations: Writer, poet
- Writing career
- Language: Korean

Korean name
- Hangul: 송찬호
- Hanja: 宋璨好
- RR: Song Chanho
- MR: Song Ch'anho

Song Chanho (Korean: 송찬호, born 1959) is a South Korean poet.

== Life ==
Song Chanho was born in Boeun County, North Chungcheong Province, South Korea in 1959. He studied German language and literature at Kyungpook National University. His writing career began in 1987 when several of his poems, including "Geumho River" (금호강), were published in the literary journal Literature of Our Age. Song published his first poetry collection, The Soil Has the Memory of a Square (흙은 사각형의 기억을 갖고 있다, 1989) two years later.

Song won the thirteenth Dongsuh Literary Award and nineteenth Kim Su-yeong Literary Award, both in 2000. He has also received the Daesan Literary Award (2009) and the Yi Sang Literary Award (2010).

== Writing ==
Song Chanho's style of writing is experimental lyric poetry. His first poetry collection, The Soil Has the Memory of a Square (흙은 사각형의 기억을 갖고 있다, 1989) centred around the image of a square with no exit as a metaphor for life and death. His second poetry collection, The Chair That Remained Empty for Ten Years (10년 동안의 빈 의자, 1994), similarly focused on contrasting opposites, with more emphasis on the use of language. Song Chanho also frequently uses nature imagery to convey meaning, such as in Red Eyes, Camellia (붉은 눈, 동백, 2000). More recent works, such as The Night of the Cat's Return (고양이가 돌아오는 저녁, 2009), have more explicitly criticized society and civilization in general.

Of Song's fifth poetry collection, Pink Wooden Shoes (분홍 나막신, 2016), literary critic Yi Jae-bok wrote that Song's poetry had "a classical elegance as the result of his deep reflection on language and existence." Several of Song's poems and one of his poetry collections have been translated into English.

== Works ==
=== Works in Korean (partial) ===
- The Soil Has the Memory of a Square (흙은 사각형의 기억을 갖고 있다, 1989)
- The Chair That Remained Empty for Ten Years (10년 동안의 빈 의자, 1994)
- Red Eyes, Camellia (붉은 눈, 동백, 2000)
- The Night of the Cat's Return (고양이가 돌아오는 저녁, 2009)
- Pink Wooden Shoes (분홍 나막신, 2016)
- Like a Goose Going To Play in the Aster Fields (쑥부쟁이밭에 놀러 가는 거위 같이, 2016)

=== Works in translation ===
- The Night of the Cat's Return
- AZALEA: Journal of Korean Literature and Culture (Volume One)
- Douze poètes coréens contemporains

== Awards ==
- 2000: 13th Dongsuh Literary Award
- 2000: 19th Kim Suyeong Literary Award
- 2008: 8th Midang Literary Award
- 2009: 17th Daesan Literary Award
- 2010: 3rd Yi Sang Literary Award
