= Kim Suyeong Literary Award =

The Kim Suyeong Literary Award is a literary award established in 1981 by Minumsa in honor of the South Korean poet Kim Su-yeong.

== Prizewinners ==
| # | Year | Winner | Work |
|---|---|---|---|
| 1 | 1981 | Jung Hee-sung | 저문 강에 삽을 씻고 |
| 2 | 1982 | Lee Seong-bok | 뒹구는 돌은 언제 잠 깨는가 |
| 3 | 1983 | Hwang Ji-u | 새들도 세상을 뜨는구나 |
| 4 | 1984 | Kim Kwang-kyu | 아니다 그렇지 않다 |
| 5 | 1985 | Choi Seungho | 고슴도치의 마을 |
| 6 | 1986 | Kim Yong-taik | 맑은 날 |
| 7 | 1987 | Jang Jung-il | 햄버거에 대한 명상 |
| 8 | 1989 | Kim Jeong-ung | 천로역정, 혹은 |
| 9 | 1990 | Yi Ha-seok | 우리 낯선 사람들 |
| 10 | 1991 | Jo Jeonggwon | 산정묘지 |
| 12 | 1993 | Yi Gi-cheol | 지상에서 부르고 싶은 노래 |
| 13 | 1994 | Cha Chang-ryong | 해가 지지 않는 쟁기질 |
| 14 | 1995 | Kim Ki-taek | 바늘 구멍 속의 폭풍 |
| 15 | 1996 | Yoo Ha | 세운상가 키드의 사랑 |
| 16 | 1997 | Kim Hyesoon | 불쌍한 사랑 기계 |
| 17 | 1998 | Ra Heeduk | 그곳이 멀지 않다 |
| 18 | 1999 | Baek Ju-eun | 지금 어디에 계십니까 |
| 19 | 2000 | Song Chanho | 붉은 눈, 동백 |
| 20 | 2001 | Yi Jeong-rok | 제비꽃 여인숙 |
| 21 | 2002 | Chae Ho-ki | 수련 |
| 22 | 2003 | Yi Yun-hak | 꽃막대기와 꽃뱀과 소녀와 |
| 23 | 2004 | Hwang In-suk | 자명한 산책 |
| 24 | 2005 | Ham Min-bok | 말랑말랑한 힘 |
| 25 | 2006 | Kang Gi-won | 바다로 가득 찬 책 |
| 26 | 2007 | Sun Myung-moon | 검은 표범 여인 |
| 27 | 2008 | Yeo Tae-cheon | 스윙 |
| 28 | 2009 | Kim Kyung-ju | 시차의 눈을 달랜다 |
| 29 | 2010 | Kim Seong-dae | 귀 없는 토끼에 관한 소수 의견 |
| 30 | 2011 | Seo Hyo-in | 백 년 동안의 세계대전 |
| 31 | 2012 | Hwan Gin-chan | 구관조 씻기기 |
| 32 | 2013 | Son Mi | 양파 공동체 |
| 33 | 2014 | Gihyeok | 모스크바예술극장의 기립 박수 |
| 34 | 2015 | Hwang Yu-Won | 세상의 모든 최대화 |
| 35 | 2016 | Taewoon Ahn | 감은 눈이 내 얼굴을 |
| 36 | 2017 | Moon Bo Young | 책기둥 |
| 37 | 2018 | Soho Lee | 캣콜링 |
| 38 | 2019 | Kwon Park | 이해할 차례이다 |
| 39 | 2020 | Lee Gi-ri | 그 웃음을 나도 좋아해 |
