= Min-jung (name) =

- Hangul: 민정
- RR: Minjeong
- MR: Minjŏng

Min-jung, also spelled Min-jeong, is a Korean given name.

People with this name include:

== Entertainers ==
- Seo Min-jung (born 1979), South Korean actress
- Lee Min-jung (born 1982), South Korean actress
- Kim Min-jung (actress) (born 1982), South Korean actress
- Han Yeo-reum (born Seo Min-jeong, 1983), South Korean actress
- Yeo Min-jeong (voice actress) (born 1986), South Korean voice actress
- Winter (singer) (born Kim Min-jeong, 2001), South Korean singer

== Sportspeople ==
- Ku Min-jung (born 1973), South Korean volleyball player
- Kim Min-jung (speed skater) (born 1985), South Korean speed skater
- Kim Min-jung (badminton) (born 1986), South Korean badminton player
- Kwak Min-jeong (born 1994), South Korean figure skater
- Kim Min-jung (judoka) (born 1997), South Korean judoka
- Kim Min-jung (sport shooter) (born 1997), South Korean sport shooter
- Choi Min-jeong (born 1998), South Korean short track speed skater

== Other ==
- Mina Cheon (born Cheon Min-jeong, 1973), South Korean-born American new media artist
- Kim Min-jeong (poet) (born 1976), South Korean poet

== See also ==
- List of Korean given names
