= Yi Seongbok =

South Korean poet (born 1952)

- Born: June 4, 1952 (age 74)
- Education: Seoul National University
- Writing career
- Language: Korean

Korean name
- Hangul: 이성복
- Hanja: 李晟馥
- RR: I Seongbok
- MR: I Sŏngbok

Yi Seongbok (Korean: 이성복, born June 4, 1952) is a South Korean poet.

== Life ==
Yi Seongbok was born on June 4, 1952, in Gyeongsangbuk-do, Korea. Yi earned both his M.A. and B.A. from Seoul National University and has taught French Literature at Keimyung University in Daegu.

== Career ==
Yi Seongbok's poetry evokes events and landscapes unfolding above a horizon of unlimited interpretive possibilities. As Kim Hyeon stated of Yi's poetry, "It vastly expands its meaning to permit endless questions, not only on an individual or private level, but on a collective and public one as well." Yi has attracted attention for his imaginative and multi-layered poetry which features European influences including Baudelaire, Kafka and Nietzsche and often attacks the corruption, hypocrisy, and perversion of the modern world.

Yi Seongbok's poetry suggests that all things exist in relation to other things, and that there is no core or isolated act. All binary categories—the collective versus individual or the social versus the ontological—are simultaneously one. But Yi's poetry does not deny opposition itself. Rather, through such distinctions, his poetic world reads more dynamically, and represents the overcoming of life's pain with the strength gained through the exchange of meanings from opposing categories.

== Selected works ==
=== Works in Korean (partial) ===
- When Will the Rolling Stone Awaken? (뒹구는 돌은 언제 잠 깨는가, 1980)
- Namhae's Gold Mountain (남해 금산(南海錦山), 1986)
- The End of That Summer (그 여름의 끝, 1990)
- Memory of the Holly Tree (호랑가시나무의 기억, 1993)
- In My Beloved Brothel (정든 유곽에서, 1996)
- Why Didn't I Say Anything About the Rain-Soaked Pomegranate Petals? (나는 왜 비에 젖은 석류 꽃잎에 대해 아무 말도 못 했는가, 2001)
- Your Pain Won't Make the Leaves Turn Green (네 고통은 나뭇잎 하나 푸르게 하지 못한다, 2001)
- Ah, Those Things Without Mouths (아 입이 없는 것들, 2003)
- Rippling Marks on the Moon's Brow (달의 이마에는 물결무늬 자국, 2003)
- Come To Be Sorrowful (래여애반다라(來如哀反多羅))

=== Works in translation ===
- I Heard Life Calling Me: Poems of Yi Song-Bok (남해금산/ 뒹구는 돌)
- Wie anders sind die Nächte (아, 입이 없는 것들)
- . Indeterminate Inflorescence trans. Anton Hur 2023
- That Summer’s End trans. Anton Hur 2026

== Awards ==
- Kim Suyeong Literary Award (1982)
- Sowol Poetry Prize (1990)
- Contemporary Literature (Hyundae Munhak) Award (2008)
