= Lee Jaemoo =

South Korean poet and educator (born 1958)

Lee Jaemoo (Korean: 이재무; born 1958) is a South Korean poet and educator. He started writing by publishing works on Salmui Munhak, and Literature and Society. He is a lyrical poet that examines objects and inner sides with a subtle but solid voice. He won the 2nd Nango (Kim Satgat) Literature Prize, the Pyeonwoon Literature Prize, the 1st Yun Dongju Poetry Prize, and the Hannam Literature Prize. Currently he is working as a professor at Seoul Digital University.

== Life ==
Lee Jaemoo was born in Buyeo, South Chungcheong Province, South Korea. He graduated from Hannam University in Korean literature. He also completed a master's degree in Korean literature at Dongguk University. He began his literary career in 1983 after publishing 5 poems including "Gwireul hubinda" (귀를 후빈다; I'm Picking My Ear) on a mook called Salmui Munhak. From 1993 to 1994, he was the deputy chairman of the poetry subcommittee of the Association of Writers for National Literature. In 1994, he was a representative of the Korean People's Artist Federation. He was awarded the 2nd Nango Literature Prize in 2002. He was awarded the 15th Pyeon-un Literature award in 2005. In 2006, he was awarded the 1st Yun Dongju Literature Award. He has published poetry collections Seotdalgeumeum (섣달그믐; New Year's Eve, 1987), Ondadeon saram oji ango (온다던 사람 오지 않고; The One Who Promised to Come Does Not, 1990), Beolcho (벌초; Mowing the Grass, 1992), Mom-e Pineun Kkot (몸에 피는 꽃; A Flower that Blossoms on the Body, 1996), Siganui geumul (시간의 그물; The Net of Time, 1997), Widaehan siksa (위대한 식사; The Great Meal, 2002), Pureun gojib (푸른 고집; Blue Stubbornness, 2004), Nugunga nareul ulgo itdamyeon (누군가 나를 울고 있다면; If Someone is Crying Me, 2007), Jeonyeok 6 si (저녁 6 시; 6 in the Afternoon, 2007), Gyeongkwaehan yurang (경쾌한 유랑; Cheerful Wandering, 2011), and Seulpeume-ge mureupuel kkulda (슬픔에게 무릎을 꿇다; Succumbing to Sadness, 2014). He also published a poetry anthology Oraedoen nongdam (오래된 농담; An Old Joke, 2008), and a handwritten poetry collection, Jureumsoke nareul darinda (주름 속에 나를 다린다; Ironing Myself Among the Wrinkles, 2013), as well as poetry critique collection, Saramdeul sai-e kkot-I pindamyeon (사람들 사이에 꽃이 핀다면; If Flowers Blossomed Among People, 2005). He published an essay collection, Saengui byeonbang-eseo (생의 변방에서; At the Edge of Life, 2003), and Sesang-eseo jeil matitneun bab (세상에서 제일 맛있는 밥; The World's Tastiest Meal, 2010). He also co-authored Minjoksi-in Shin Kyeong-nim si-ineul chataseo (민족시인 신경림 시인을 찾아서; In Search of the National Poet, Shin Kyeong-nim), and compiled Daepyosi, Daepyopyeongron I, II (대표시, 대표평론 I, II; Representative Poetry, The Theory of Critique I, II). He taught poetry writing at Dongguk University graduate school, Hanshin University, Chugye University for the Arts, Chongju National College of Science and Technology, and Hannam University. He is currently the editor in chief of the seasonal journal, Sijak, and is also working as a professor at Seoul Digital University.

== Writing ==
Lee Jaemoo's poetry is lyrical. With a sincere voice, he has expressed sympathy for those that have been excluded, love for the minority, reminiscence on nature and mother, and truthful examination on life and literature. Of course, even though he possesses such consistent critical mind, Lee Jaemoo's poetry has experienced changes according to the period. If his poetry can be divided into three periods: first is the beginning of his literary career and the publication of his first poetry collection Seotdalgeumeum (섣달그믐; New Year's Eve) until his third poetry collection, Beolcho (벌초; Mowing the Grass). The second is from the time of his fourth poetry collection, Mom-e Pineun Kkot (몸에 피는 꽃; A Flower that Blossoms on the Body). The third is after he published his fifth poetry collection, Widaehan siksa (위대한 식사; The Great Meal).

During his first period, the poet, who comes from the countryside, reminisced about his family history and surrounding stories with a calm voice. In contrast, his second period was mostly of works that describes the suffering and conflict of people that moved from the countryside into the city, as they lead lives of hardship and long for their hometown. While the first period had works showing memories of the past as they are, the second was a time where he expressed the frustration of the modern person's life in the city, as and their desire to return home. Lastly, the third period showed how the poet himself was aware of the harsh reality he must live as a city dweller, but also an image of how he dreams of returning to nature along with civilization.

Lee Jaemoo's poetry shows the narrator's adolescent experiences in the countryside, often rebuking for today's civilized society that have lost its innocence. He compares the lives of healthy countryside lifestyle with the cold, dry life of modern people. In contemporary times, he criticizes 'progress', an ideology of modernism, and often writes works arguing for restoration of the environment. Even in political criticism, he shows lyrical sensitivity and he writes based on his own experiences. His works are rooted in ecological imagination, recovering life's virtues and values that have been lost by capitalism after the modern times, hence his accolade as one of Korea's major lyric poets who criticizes civilization.

== Works ==
=== Poetry collections ===
- Seotdalgeumeum (섣달그믐 New Year's Eve), Cheongsa, 1987.
- Ondadeon saram oji ango (온다던 사람 오지 않고 The One Who Promised to Come Does Not), Moonji Publishing, 1990.
- Beolcho (벌초 Mowing the Grass), Silcheon Munhak, 1992.
- Mom-e Pineun Kkot (몸에 피는 꽃 A Flower that Blossoms on the Body), Changbi, 1996.
- Siganui geumul (시간의 그물 The Net of Time), Munhakdongne, 1997.
- Widaehan siksa (위대한 식사 The Great Meal), Segyesa, 2002.
- Pureun gojib (푸른 고집 Blue Stubbornness), Cheonnyeonui sijak, 2004.
- Nugunga nareul ulgo itdamyeon (누군가 나를 울고 있다면 If Someone is Crying Me), Hwanam Publishing, 2007.
- Jeonyeok 6 si (저녁 6 시 6 in the afternoon), Changbi, 2007.
- Gyeongkwaehan yurang (경쾌한 유랑 Cheerful Wandering), Moonji Publishing, 2011.
- Seulpeume-ge mureupuel kkulda (슬픔에게 무릎을 꿇다 Succumbing to Sadness), Silcheon Munhak, 2014.

=== Poetry anthologies ===
- Oraedoen nongdam (오래된 농담 An Old Joke), Bookin, 2008.
- Jureumsoke nareul darinda (주름 속에 나를 다린다 Ironing Myself Among the Wrinkles) ZMANZ, 2013.

=== Poetry critique collections ===
- Saramdeul sai-e kkot-I pindamyeon (사람들 사이에 꽃이 핀다면 If Flowers Blossomed Among People), Hwanam, 2005.

=== Essay collections ===
- Saengui byeonbang-eseo (생의 변방에서 At the Edge of Life) Hwanam, 2003.
- Sesang-eseo jeil matitneun bab (세상에서 제일 맛있는 밥 The World's Tastiest Meal), Hwanam, 2010.
- Jibchakeurobuteo-ui dopi (집착으로부터의 도피 Escape from Obsession), Cheonnyeonui sijak, 2016.

== Awards ==
- 2002 2nd Nango Literature Prize
- 2005 15th Pyeon-un Literature Award
- 2006 1st Yun Dongju Literature Award
