= Kim Ki-taek =

Korean poet

- Born: 1957 (age 68–69)
- Occupations: Poet, Professor
- Writing career
- Language: Korean

Korean name
- Hangul: 김기택
- RR: Gim Gitaek
- MR: Kim Kit'aek

Kim Ki-taek (Korean: 김기택; born 1957) is a modern South Korean poet.

== Biography ==
Kim Ki-taek was born in 1957 in Anyang, Gyeonggi Province, South Korea. While many artists consider regular work, particularly the life of a white-collar worker, as a hindrance to creativity, Kim Ki-taek has successfully achieved a career as a poet while also working full-time. Kim was raised as an orphan, having been sent to an orphanage in Anyang from the Seoul Municipal Children's Hospital in 1961. Thus, Kim had to fend for himself from an early age and adapt to varied social situations. This history has given him a strong desire to have a stable position in society. Kim currently serves as a professor at Kyung Hee Cyber University.

== Work ==
Kim's poetry is unsentimental and focuses on human physicality and the relationship between the body and the violence inflicted upon it. Fear and compulsion are integral parts of the human body, the poet believes. Material and psychological violence inflicted on the human body leaves its mark behind, and this mark eventually manifests itself in various habits that continue to inform one's sense of self. Kim carefully observes this process and records it in his poetry. For this reason, Kim has been described as "an observer of minute and microscopic details."

A series of his poems linked by a common motif — "Mouse," "Tiger," "Snake,"and "Ox" — focus on the instinct to survive. The tension resulting from the violence and pain inherent in the game of survival is depicted without any sentimentality. However, the cold logic of survival that color Kim's poetic world is pierced by the presence of new life such as "a biddy crying in front of a subway station" and "the sound of an insect coming from a TV in the middle of a night." In the history of violence and pain etched into our body over many generations, the poet discovers a glimpse of a wondrous new world featuring purity, innocence and mystery.

== Awards ==
- Kim Soo-young Literary Prize (1995)
- Contemporary Literature (Hyundae Munhak) Award (2001)
- Yi Soo Literary Prize (2004)
- Midang Literary Award (2004)
- Ji Hoon Literature Award (2006)
- Sanghwa Poet's Award (2009)
- Kyung Hee Literature Prize (2009)
- Pyeongun Literature Prize (2013)

== Works in translation ==
- "El Chicle" - Spanish (Kkeom)

== Works in Korean (partial list) ==
- Fetal Sleep (Taea-ui jam 1991)
- Storm in the Eye of a Needle (Baneulgumeong sok-ui pokpung 1994)
- Office Worker (Samuwon 1999)
- Ox (So 2005)
- Gum (Kkeom 2009)
- Crack, Crack (Gallajinda gallajinda 2012)

== See also ==
- Korean literature
- List of Korean-language poets
