= Chong Hyon-jong =

South Korean writer (born 1939)

- Born: December 17, 1939 (age 86); Keijō, Korea, Empire of Japan
- Citizenship: South Korean
- Writing career
- Language: Korean

Korean name
- Hangul: 정현종
- Hanja: 鄭玄宗
- RR: Jeong Hyeonjong
- MR: Chŏng Hyŏnjong

Chong Hyon-jong (Korean: 정현종; born 17 December 1939) is a South Korean writer and reporter.

== Life ==
Chong Hyon-jong was born on 17 December 1939 in Seoul, then known as Keijō, as it was during the Japanese colonial period. Chong attended Taegwang High School and graduated from the Philosophy Department of Yonsei University in 1965. He worked as a reporter for the Seoul Newspaper and JoongAng Ilbo and was a professor in the Creative Writing Department at Seoul Institute of Arts. He has recently retired from a professorship at Yonsei University in Seoul.

== Work ==
Chong's poetry revises and reviews traditional lyric poetry. His early poems discarded the trend of nihilistic, traditional lyric poetry from the postwar period, to explore the possibilities of transcending the pain of reality within the tense relationship between the dreams of self and of the external world. Even as his poetry addressed the conflict and strife of conflicting ideas or elements like pain and celebration, water and fire, heaviness and lightness, and sadness and happiness, it explored the dynamic tension of a mentality that sought to transform pain into happiness, and reality into a dream. He continued this poetic exploration in his second and third books of poems, I'm Mr. Star (Naneun byeolajeossi) and Like a bean that has fallen and bounced up (Tteoreojyeodo twineun gongcheoreom).

Chong's fourth collection, There's Not a Lot of Time to Love (Saranghal sigani manchi anta), was a turning point in the poet's career, in its examination of the rapture and acceptance of life, and the wonders of nature. These works also evinced a new penchant for a world of reconciliation rather than conflict. This change in poetic interest became more evident in his fifth book of poems, One Flower (Han kkotsongi). "A Foot" (Ja), a poem that claims civilization and artificiality are suppressing mankind, and that nature is the sole means for salvation, is a direct manifestation of the poet's shift in thematic focus.

== Works in translation ==
- The Dream of Things: Selected Poems of Hyonjong Chong. Translated by Won-Chung Kim and Mi-Jin Kim. Homa & Sekey Books, 2008.
- Day-Shine (정현종 시선)
- Murmullos de gloria (광휘의 속삭임)
- Poesía coreana actual (현대한국시선)

== Works in Korean (partial) ==
- Dreams of Things (Samurui kkum, 1972)
- I'm Mr. Star (Naneun byeolajeossi)
- Like a bean that has fallen and bounced up (Tteoreojyeodo twineun gongcheoreom)
- There's Not a Lot of Time to Love (Saranghal sigani manchi anta)

== Awards ==
- Yeonam Literary Prize (1990)
- Midang Literary Award (2001)
- Kyung-Ahm Prize (2006)
