= Hwang Ji-u =

Korean poet and art critic (born 1952)

- Born: 1952 (age 73–74)
- Citizenship: South Korean
- Education: Seoul National University, Sogang University
- Writing career
- Language: Korean

- Hwang Ji-u
- Hangul: 황지우
- Hanja: 黃芝雨
- RR: Hwang Jiu
- MR: Hwang Chiu

Hwang Ji-u is a Korean poet and art critic.

== Life ==
Hwang Ji-u was born in South Jeolla Province in 1952. He studied Aesthetics at Seoul National University and Philosophy at Sogang University. Hwang Ji-u is a native of Haenam at the southernmost tip of the Korean Peninsula. He developed a deep interest in poetry while majoring in aesthetics and philosophy at college and graduate school. While active in literary circles in college, he participated in several anti-government protests and was forcefully drafted into military service. After being discharged from the army, he was expelled from university for his involvement in anti- government activities and was subjected to imprisonment and torture. The agonies and passions of his younger years are demonstrated in undertones throughout his poems, and artistically, if also painfully, sublimated against the background of the political conditions of his era. Hwang has worked as a Professor in the Department of Creative Writing, Hansin University.

== Work ==
The poetry of Hwang Ji-u's poetry is distinguished by both its intricate, exquisitely lyrical descriptions of human sensuality and its frustration and anxiety towards reality. Therefore, his poetry contains a binary texture, as both coarse and delicate. Another distinguishing characteristic of Hwang's poetry is its strong political consciousness. Hwang Jiu largely uses two methods to deliver his political message, in the coded symbolism of "Kkonmal," and the satire and sarcasm of "Geunhwang" and "Bat" (Bakjwi). The latter method is commonly employed in other political or propagandistic poetry, though Hwang's usage is unique in its origin in the poet's own experience, which ultimately leads the imagination of readers. The poet is currently interested in Buddhist philosophy (Mireuk Sasang) and its literary influence. Hwang Ji-u's other collections of poetry include "Birds Fly Away Too" (Saedeuldo sesangeul tteuneunguna), "From Winter Trees to Spring Trees" (Gyeoul namurobuteo bom namuero), and "Genun sogui yeonkkot."

== Works in translation ==
- Even Birds Leave the World (황지우 시선집)
- Die Schatten der Fische (황지우 시선집)
- Би Бол Чи Юм (황지우 시선-나는 너다) (황지우 시선-나는 너다)
- El tiempo transparente (한국시선)
- No brilla la luz verdadera (어느날 나는 흐린 주점에 앉아 있을 거다)
- De L'Hiver-de-L'Arbre Au Printemps-de-L'Arbre (황지우 시선집)

== Works in Korean (partial) ==
- Birds Also Appear Among Us (Saedeuldo sesang eul ddeuneun guna, Munhakgwa jiseongsa, 1983
- From the Winter Trees to the Spring Trees (Gyeoul namurobuteo bom namu ero, Mineumsa, 1985)
- I am You (Na neun neo da, Pulbit Publishers, 1987)
- Lotus in the Eye of the Crab (Genun sok ui yeonggot, Munhakgwa jiseongsa, 1991)
- One Day I Will Sit in a Dimly-Lit Bar (Eoneu nal na neun heurin jujeom sok e an ja isseul geoda, Munhakgwa jiseongsa, 1999)

== Awards ==
- New Spring Literary Contest Prize (1980)
- The Kim Suyeong Literary Award (1983)
- Sowol Poetry Prize (1983)
- Contemporary Literature Award (1983)
- Daesan Literary Awards (1999)
