= Yi Yongak =

South Korean reporter

- Hangul: 이용악
- Hanja: 李庸岳
- RR: I Yongak
- MR: I Yongak

Yi Yongak (Korean: 이용악; 1914–1971) was a South Korean reporter and poet who wrote about the injustices of the Japanese occupation of Korea and about the political system of North Korea.

In Yi's poetry, an individual's wound is associated with the historical situations at that time and becomes the problems of the Korean community as a whole.

== Biography ==
Yi was born in 1914 in Kyongsong, North Hamgyong Province, in what is today North Korea, to a merchant who smuggled salt. He lost his father at an early age and grew up in deep grinding poverty. In 1932, while in fourth grade in Gyeongseong agricultural school, Yi transferred to a middle school in Hiroshima in Japan. Yi's first published work was "Paebaejaeui sowon (패배자의 소원 Wish of the Defeated)" published in Shin Inmunhak (신인문학 New Humanities) in 1935.

Yi was admitted to the media department of Sophia University in April, 1936. During that time, Yi worked many part-time jobs to pay his tuition. Yi published a literary coterie magazine, titled, Iin (2인 Two People), with Kim Jonghan. His first collection of poems, Bunsuryeong (분수령 Watershed) was published in 1937, and the following year, Nalgeunjip (낡은 집 Shabby House) came out.

After graduating from the university in 1939, Yi came back to Korea to work as an editor of Inmunpyeongron (인문평론 Humanities Review). When the review was discontinued in 1941, he worked as a reporter of Cheongjin Ilbo, a Japanese newspaper until 1943. Yi then worked as a clerk at a county office in Gyeongseong, but resigned in 1943.

After the end of World War II in 1945, Yi returned to Seoul to become a member of the Korean Literature Construction Center. In November 1945, he started working as a reporter of Joongangshinmum for a year. After he joined the Workers' Party of South Korea in 1947, Yi became a key member of the Seoul branch of the Federation of Korean Cultural Organizations. Yi was arrested in 1949 and sent to Seodaemun Prison due to the cultural event by the Workers' Party in Seoul in February 1950.

When the North Korean Army seized Seoul at the beginning of the Korean War, Yi was released from Seodaemun. He then served as publicity manager of the Federation of South Korean Writers before finally defecting to North Korea.

From 1951 to 1952, Yi, served on the central committee of the Federation of Korean Cultural Organizations in North Korea. In 1956, he released a series of "Pyeongnamkwangaesicho (평남관개시초 Selected Poems of Pyeongnam Irrigation)," and in 1963, together with Kim Sanghun, he published Pungyoseonjip (풍요선집 Anthology of Poongyo) which contained translations of Chinese poetry and Akbu poems.

Yi died of tuberculosis in 1971. In 2019, the Yi Yongak Literary Award, was established.

== Writing ==
=== Pre-World War II ===
Through Watershed (1937) and Shabby House (1938), Yi describes the poor and miserable life of the colonized mostly based in the northern part of Korea. The narrator's pain is not limited to personal matters but it related to the experiences of his neighbors, and further expanded to the colonial Korean communities. Due to their narrativity, his poems are called narrative poems.

His first collection, Watershed, describes his own life where he had to do labor work to make ends meet near the northern border area after he had lost his father. It represents his determination to overcome the hardship even though he was living in hunger and loneliness.

An extension of Watershed, Shabby House focuses on poverty and immigration issues of the colonized. Compared with Watershed, however, it was written in less abstract language with less Chinese characters used. Thanks to more sophisticated poetic word, this collection became his most representative work.

=== Post-World War II ===
Orangkaekkot (오랑캐꽃 Violets; 1947) was published after Korea became independent but most of the poems in the collection were written during the colonial period. The title piece, "Violets" depicts the Korean people who suffered persecution after they were thrown out to the barren northern border area under Japanese rule. Violets highlights the poet's inner side rather than illustrating the reality of that time probably because the poems were written near the end of the colonial period when the oppression got all the more severe. His consciousness of community shown through the earlier poems was replaced with lyrical narrative and sophisticated style.

After defecting to North Korea, Yi wrote poems advocating the North Korean political system and literary policies for propaganda. Describing in a romantic tone the completion of South Pyongan Province irrigation construction that was conducted to recover from the Korean War, the series of "Selected Poems of Pyeongnam Irrigation" received positive reviews from the North Korean literary communities.

== Works ==
1) Complete Works

윤영천 편, 《이용악 시전집》, 창작과 비평, 1988 / Iyongak sijeonjip (Complete Poetry of Yi Yongak), Changbi, 1988.

이경수, 곽효환, 이현승 편, 《이용악 전집》, 소명출판사, 2015 / Iyoungak jeonjip (Complete Works of Yi Yongak), Somyeong, 2015

윤영천 편, 《이용악 시전집》, 문학과지성사, 2018 / Iyongak sijeonjip (Complete Poetry of Yi Yongak), Moonji, 2018.

2) Poetry Collections

《분수령》, 삼문사, 1937 / Bunsuryeong (Watershed), Sammunsa, 1937.

《낡은 집》, 삼문사, 1938 / Nalgeunjip (Shabby House), Sammunsa, 1938.

《오랑캐꽃》, 아문각, 1947 / Orangkaekkot (Violets), Amungak, 1947.

《리용악시선집》, 조선작가동맹출판사, 1957 / Liyongaksiseonjip (Anthology of Yi Yongak's Poems), Joseonjakkadongmaeng, 1957.

《당이 부르는 길로》, 조선작가동맹출판사, 1960 / Dangi bureunen gillo (Toward the Way the Party Calls From), Joseonjakkadongmaeng, 1960.

《그날을 위하여》, 조선작가동맹출판사, 1960 / Geunareul wihayeo (For the Day), Joseonjakkadongmaeng, 1960

《뜨거운 포옹》, 조선작가동맹출판사, 1960 / Ddeugeoun poong (Passionate Embrace) Joseonjakkadongmaeng, 1960.

《당에 영광을》, 조선작가동맹 출판사, 1961 / Dange yeongkwangeul (Glory to the Party), Joseonjakkadongmaeng, 1961.

《초국이여 번영하라》, 문예출판사, 1968 / Jokukiyeo beonyeonghara (May My Country Prosper) Munye, 1968.

《철벽의 요새》, 조선문학예술총동맹출판사, 1968 / Cheolbyeoke yosae (Impregnable Fortress), Joseonmunhakyesulchongdongmaeng, 1968.

《판가리싸움에》, 문예출판사, 1968 / Pangari ssaume (Fight for Life or Death), Munye, 1968.

== Works in Translation ==
《시를 새기다》, Asia, 2016/ Korean Poems Printed by Letterpress, ASIA 2016.

== Awards ==
1956, 1st prize in poetry of the Literary Art Awards celebrating the 5th anniversary of North Korean People's Army ("Selected Poems of Pyeongnam Irrigation")

== See also ==
"Yi Yonhak" Doopedia

이용악

"Yi Yongah" Encyclopedia of Korean Culture

'이용악' 검색
