= Midang Literary Award =

- Awarded for: Poetry
- Country: South Korea
- First award: 2001

- Midang Literary Award
- Hangul: 미당문학상
- Hanja: 未堂文學賞
- Revised Romanization: Midang munhaksang
- McCune–Reischauer: Midang munhaksang

Midang Literary Award (Korean: 미당문학상) is established in June 2001 by the JoongAng Ilbo to honor the literary achievements of Seo Jeong-ju. ('Midang' is a penname of Seo Jeong-ju). In 2001, it was established with the Hwang Soon-won Literature Award in the novel section. The prize money is 30 million won.

On the other hand, the Writers Association of Korea argues the abolition of the literary award in connection with the pro-Japanese activities of Midang.

== Winners ==
Year	Poet	Work
2001	Chong Hyon-jong	견딜 수 없네 I can't stand it
2002	Hwang Tong-gyu	탁족(濯足) A foot washing
2003	Choi Seungho	텔레비전 Television
2004	Kim Ki-taek	어떻게 기억해냈을까 How did she remember?
2005	Moon Taejun	누가 울고 간다 Someone goes crying
2006	Kim Hyesoon	모래 여자 Woman of Sand
2007	Moon In-soo	식당의자 Dining chair
2008	Song Chanho	가을 Fall
2009	Kim Eon	기하학적인 삶 A geometrical life
2010	Jang Seoknam	가을 저녁의 말 Autumn evening's talk
2011	Lee Youngkwang	저녁은 모든 희망을
2012	Kwon Hyeok-ung	봄밤 Spring Night
2013	Hwang Byungsng	내일은 프로
2014	Ra Heeduk	심장을 켜는 사람 A heart player
2015	Choi Jeongrye	개천은 용의 홈타운 A brook is dragon's hometown
2016	Kim Haengsook	유리의 존재 The presence of glass
2017	Park Sangsoon	무궁무진한 떨림, 무궁무진한 포옹 Infinite tremor and infinite hug

== See also ==
- Poet Midang Memorial Hall
