= Kim Kwang-kyu (poet) =

South Korean poet and translator (born 1941)

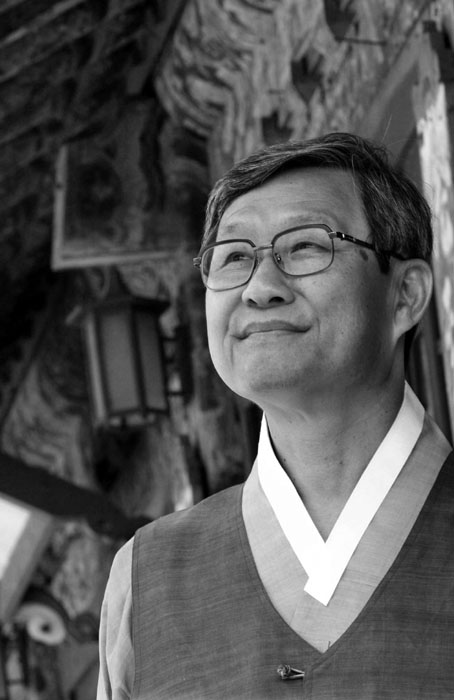
- Born: January 7, 1941 (age 85)
- Writing career
- Language: Korean

- Kim Kwang-kyu
- Hangul: 김광규
- Hanja: 金光圭
- RR: Gim Gwanggyu
- MR: Kim Kwanggyu

Kim Kwang-kyu (born January 7, 1941) is a South Korean poet and translator.

== Life ==
Kim was born in Seoul and studied German language and literature at Seoul National University. Early in his university career, he participated in the demonstrations of the April Revolution that was repressed by a massacre on April 19, 1960, leading to the fall of President Syngman Rhee. He later studied for two years in Munich 1972-4. He discovered a talent for writing during his middle and high school years when his works were published in school magazines and even won a national prize. However, he did not begin writing poetry until his return from Germany in his mid-thirties. He has been working as a professor in the German department of Hanyang University (Seoul) since 1980. He has published translations of 19th century German poems (1980), of poems by Bertolt Brecht (1985), of radio dramas by Günter Eich (1986), and of poems by Günter Eich (1987).

== Work ==
Kim utilizes simple yet highly effective language to capture the forgotten truth behind everyday experiences. According to fellow poet Choi Yearn-hong, "The most important quality of Kim Kwang-kyu's poems is that they are easy to read." With chilling poise, Kim provides a critique of the unjust world while at the same time allowing readers to reassess their own lives.

== Works in Translation ==
- Die Tiefe der Muschel – German (Jogae-ui gipi)
- The Depth of a Clam – English (" ")
- رحلة إلى سيول – Arabic (Sanghaeng)
- Faint Shadows of Love – English (Huimihan yetsarang-ui geurimja)
- Země mlh – Czech (Daejanggan-ui yuhok)

== Works in Korean (partial) ==
- The Last Dream Drenching Us (Uri-reul jeoksineun majimak kkum 1979)
- No It Is Not So (Anida geureotchi anta 1983)
- The Heart of Mt. Keunak (Keunaksan-ui maeum 1986)
- Like a Petty Mind (Jompaeng-i-cheoreom 1988)
- Water Way (Mulgil 1994)
- Though I Have Nothing (Gajin geot hana-do eopjiman 1997)
- When We First Met (Cheo-eum mannadeon ttae 2003)

== Awards ==
- Today's Writer Award (1981)
- Nokwon Literature Prize (1981)
- Kim Suyeong Literary Award (1984)
- Pyeon-un Literature Award (1994)
- Daesan Literature Prize (2003)
- Isan Literary Award (2007)

=== Awards for translations ===
- Translation Prize in the Republic of Korea Literary Awards (1991, 2001)

== See also ==
- Korean literature
- List of Korean-language poets
