= Ha Jaeyoun =

South Korean poet and professor (born 1975)

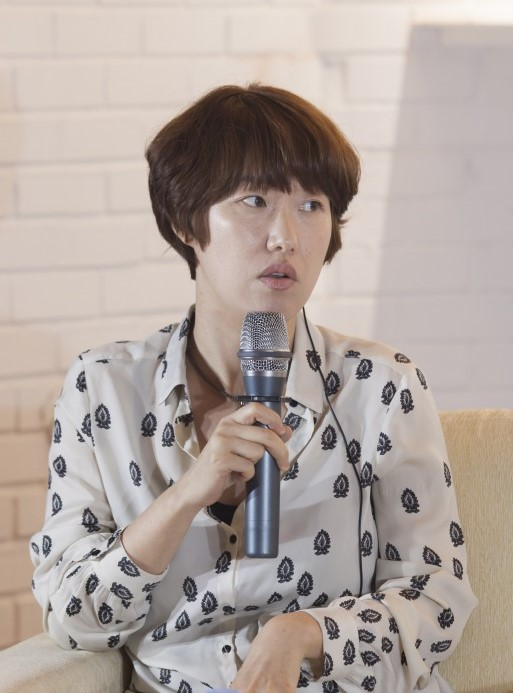
- Poet Ha Jaeyoun at the Seoul International Writers' Festival
- Occupation: Writer
- Writing career
- Genre: Poetry

Ha Jaeyoun (the romanization preferred by the author according to LTI Korea) (Hangul 하재연; born 1975) is a South Korean poet and professor. Born in Seoul, South Korea, she studied Korean literature at Korea University and earned her master's and doctoral degrees at the same institution. She has published two poetry collections since debuting in 2002. She was a visiting scholar at George Mason University, research professor at Korea University, post-doctoral researcher at Hanyang University, and is currently a research professor at the Wonkwang University Institute of Humanities. She is a member of the poetry group Inconvenience and the independent magazine Clearing Snow.

== Life ==
Ha Jaeyoun was born in Seoul, South Korea in 1975. She studied Korean literature at Korea University and went on to obtain her master's and doctoral degrees there. She made her literary debut in 2002 when the journal Literature and Society published several of her poems, including "Isibosi supeomaket" (25시 슈퍼마켓 The Supermarket at the 25th Hour). Since then she has published two poetry collections entitled Radio deijeu (라디오 데이즈 Radio Days) (2006) and Segyeui modeun haebyeoncheoreom (세계의 모든 해변처럼 Like All Beaches in the World) (2012), as well as a monograph called Geundaesiui moheomgwa umjigineun joseoneo (근대시의 모험과 움직이는 조선어 The Adventure of Modern Poetry and the Changing Korean Language) (2012). In 2005, she became a visiting scholar at George Mason University. In the following years, she was appointed research professor at Korea University and post-doctoral researcher at Hanyang University, before starting her current position as research professor at the Wonkwang University Institute of Humanities. She participated in the 2016 Seoul International Writers' Festival. Since 2016, she has been a member of Nunchiwoogi, a group of artists that publishes a crowdfunded poetry magazine.

== Writing ==
Ha Jaeyoun's poetry reflects on familiar objects found in reality but manages to convey a new sensibility. Ha describes how people have grown accustomed to meaningless relationships and futile emotions in a society of dazzling spectacle. Without ever expressing intense emotion, she portrays the world she has internalized in a way that resonates with today's desensitized audience. The paradoxical nature of "familiar indifference" creates dynamism in her poetry and thus gives it a sense of new freedom.

Ha's first poetry collection Radio deijeu (라디오 데이즈 Radio Days) often uses everyday objects and experiences as subject matter, such as a cloud, bench, park, sunlight-filled window, TV screen, comic book shop around the corner, sleepy afternoon, and shabby neighborhood house with an iron gate. Such realistic subjects make her poetry highly accessible to readers. But when Ha describes her subjects, she also expresses doubt about her memory of them; the objects and phenomena portrayed in her work are constantly moving and changing.

Her second poetry collection Segyeui modeun haebyeoncheoreom (세계의 모든 해변처럼 Like All Beaches in the World) allows readers to visualize abstract spaces using images of dolls, ghosts, animals, and more. While Ha features numerous ordinary scenes and objects, she contemplates them with as little emotion as possible. Her dispassionate tone may be seen as an attempt to squarely face the sadness in the world.

== Works ==
=== Poetry collections ===
1. <라디오 데이즈>, 문학과 지성, 2006 {Radio Days. Moonji, 2006.}

2. <세계의 모든 해변처럼>, 문학과 지성, 2012 {Like All Beaches in the World. Moonji, 2012.}

=== Monographs ===
1. <근대시의 모험과 움직이는 조선어>, 소명출판, 2012 {The Adventure of Modern Poetry and the Changing Korean Language. Somyung Books, 2012.}
