= Jeong Ho-seung =

South Korean poet (born 1950)

Jeong Hoseung
- Born: January 3, 1950 (age 76); South Gyeongsang Province, South Korea
- Education: Kyung Hee University
- Writing career
- Language: Korean

Korean name
- Hangul: 정호승
- Hanja: 鄭浩承
- RR: Jeong Hoseung
- MR: Chŏng Hosŭng

Jeong Hoseung, also Jeong Ho-seung (Korean: 정호승, born 1950), is a popular South Korean poet.

== Life ==
Born in South Gyeongsang Province in 1950, Jeong Hoseung grew up in Daegu, and graduated with a degree in Korean literature from Kyung Hee University. That same year, he began to contribute to the literary magazine 반시(反詩) (Against Poetry), and published his first novel, Memorial Service (위령제, 1982). He was the winner of the Tenth Dong Seo Literary Prize in 1997, also winning the Sowol Poetry Prize

== Career ==
Jeong's themes include societal schisms, poverty and alienation, but his work is noted to present these themes with lyrical grace and innocence that removes any trace of hectoring. Jeong intentionally focuses on suffering in the hope that in despair some hope can be found and that this can become the basis for a more successful future. The poet also depicts the resentment and enmity that stirs in the hearts of farmers and workers whose very roots have been taken from them in a sterile South Korean society, and their attempts to resist and overcome these conditions. He spoke for the masses and took as his poetic duty, praising people for their willful and courageous attitude toward life and helping them believe in their future.

Jeong Hoseung's style of writing has often been described as being similar to traditional Korean folk songs or popular ballads.

== Selected works ==
=== Works in Korean (partial) ===
==== Poetry collections ====
- Sorrow to Joy (슬픔이 기쁨에게, 1979)
- Jesus in Seoul (서울의 예수, 1982)
- Sunrise Letter (새벽편지, 1987)
- The Stars Are Warm (별들은 따뜻하다, 1990)
- The Unshakable Reed (흔들리지 않는 갈대, 1991)
- Die in Love (사랑하다가 죽어버려라, 1997)
- Because I Am Lonely, I Am Human (외로우니까 사람이다, 1998)
- When Tears Come, Take the Train (눈물이 나면 기차를 타라, 1999)
- The Person I Love (내가 사랑하는 사람)
- For This Short Time (이 짧은 시간 동안, 2004)
- Embrace (포옹, 2007)
- The Cost of Rice (밥값, 2010)
- Wayfaring (여행, 2013)
- To the Daffodil (수선화에게, 2015)
- A Letter Not Sent (부치치 않은 편지, 2016) - bilingual (English and Korean) ISBN 9781624120800
- Though Flowers Fall I Have Never Forgotten You (꽃이 져도 나는 너를 잊은 적 없다, 2016) - bilingual (English and Korean)
- I Refuse Hope (나는 희망을 거절한다, 2017)

==== Children's books ====
- The Magpie That Flew to the Sea (바다로 날아간 까치, 1996)
- The Sorrows of Emily Jong (에밀레종의슬픔)

=== Works in Translation ===
- Five poems in Azalea: Journal of Korean Literature and Culture (2011) - translated by Mia You
- "Snail" in Alchemy: Journal of Translation (2012) - translated by Mia You
- "South Han River" in Alchemy: Journal of Translation (2012) - translated by Mia You
- Though Flowers Fall I Have Never Forgotten You: The Collected Poems of Jeong Ho-seung (2016) - translated by Brother Anthony of Taizé and Susan Hwang (ISBN 9781624120824)
- Loving (연인, 2020) - translated by Brother Anthony of Taizé (ISBN 9781624121425)
- Lonesome Jar: Poetic Fables (항아리, 2020) - translated by Brother Anthony of Taizé (ISBN 9781624121432)

== Awards ==
- Hankook Ilbo New Spring Literary Contest (1972)
- Sowol Poetry Prize (1989)
- Chosun Ilbo New Spring Literary Contest (1973)
- Daehan Daily New Spring Literary Contest (1973)
- Chosun Ilbo New Spring Literary Contest (1982)
- Jeong Jiyong Literature Prize (2000) - for "Heaven's Net" (하늘의 그물)
