= Kim Kyung-ju =

South Korean writer (born 1976)

- Born: July 14, 1976 (age 50)
- Writing career
- Language: Korean

Korean name
- Hangul: 김경주
- RR: Gim Gyeongju
- MR: Kim Kyŏngju

Kim Kyung-ju (Note: Kim Kyung-ju is the romanization preferred by the author according to LTI Korea) (born July 14, 1976) is a South Korean poet and performance artist.

== Life ==
Kim Kyung-ju was born in Gwangju, Jeollanam-do, Korea and studied Philosophy at Sogang University He made his formal debut in 2003 in the Seoul Shinmun Spring Literary Contest. While he started out as a "classic" poet, he has changed his focus to performance poetry, theater, musicals and independent films. His first book of poetry, I Am A Season That Does Not Exist In This World, was published in 2006 and made waves in the literary world, selling over ten thousand copies.

== Work ==
Kim Kyung-ju's poems frequently feature a narrator who wanders ceaselessly. Like nomads, the narrators of his poems refuse to settle down and enjoy exploring the limits of freedom. In the midst of this fluid journey, they sense the deep essence of life.

Kim strives to preserve poetry in a world that has turned its back on it. He seeks to overcome the crisis that poetry faces today by interacting with other art forms. To that end, he not only writes poetry but is also deeply interested in performances and events, such as exhibitions and book concerts. With his experience in diverse cultural activities including theater, musicals and independent films, he is working hard to enable smooth communication between young authors and their readers by organizing literary festivals.

His first book, I Am A Season That Does Not Exist In This World, is currently being translated into English. Excerpts from the book will or have appeared in prominent American literary journals and magazines such as Boston Review, Guernica, Hayden's Ferry Review, Fairy Tale Review, Spork, and Asymptote.

== Works in Korean (Partial) ==
Poetry Collections

- I Am A Season That Does Not Exist In This World (Na-neun i sesang-e eops-neun gyejeol-ida 2006)
- Epitaph (Gidam 2008)

== Awards ==
- Kim Suyeong Literary Award (2009)
- Today's Young Artist Award - Literature section (2009)

== See also ==
- Korean Literature
- List of Korean-language poets
