= Ra Heeduck =

South Korean poet (born 1966)

Ra Heeduk
- 나희덕
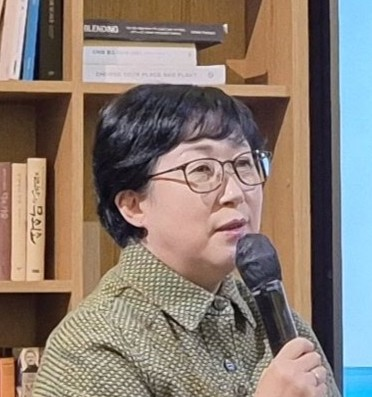
- Born: February 8, 1966 (age 60); Nonsan, South Chungcheong Province, South Korea
- Writing career
- Language: Korean

Korean name
- Hangul: 나희덕
- Hanja: 羅喜德
- RR: Na Huideok
- MR: Na Hŭidŏk

Ra Heeduk (Korean: 나희덕, born 1966) is a South Korean poet. She debuted in 1989 with her poem "To the Roots". She received many literary awards such as the Kim Suyeong Literary Award, Contemporary Literature Award, Sowol Poetry Prize, and the Daesan Literary Awards.

== Early life and education ==
Ra was born in Nonsan, South Chungcheong Province. She was raised in an orphanage in which her parents - Christians who sought to carry out the teachings of their religion through communal living - served on the administrative staff. She has confessed that the experience of living with orphans had made her a precocious child, and that the recognition of the difference between herself and her playmates early on gave her a unique perspective on the world.

She became interested in poetry in middle school. While struggling between the religious ideals fostered by her parents and the causes upheld by the student movement she encountered in college, she found relief in poetry. She graduated from the Department of Korean Language and Literature at Yonsei University with both Master's and Doctorate degrees.

== Career ==
Ra debuted in 1989 after winning JoongAng Ilbo's New Writer's Award for her poem "To the Roots" (뿌리에게).

She served as a professor in the Department of Creative Writing at Chosun University from 2001 to 2018. In 2007, she participated in the International Writing Program. She has served as a professor at Seoul National University of Science and Technology since 2019.

== Artistry ==
Ra's work shows the "generosity and warmth of the heart", which is "motherly instinct or love" that contains a "critical consciousness of the contradiction and irrationality in life and reality". Kim Jin-soo wrote that the advantage of her poem is "concise and restrained linguistic form based on the reality of concrete sensory images".

Her first collection of poems, To the Roots (뿌리에게, 1991), and her second, The Words Stained the Leaves (그 말이 잎을 물들였다, 1994), pierce the fog of hypocrisy and contradictions cast over daily life while maintaining a spirit of forgiveness and warmth. In order to become receptive to nature, she believes it is necessary to "listen with her eyes and see with her ears." Such effort is detailed in her third collection of poetry, It's Not That Far From Here (그곳이 멀지 않다, 1997), and her fourth, What Is Darkening (어두워진다는 것, 2001). She juxtaposes "sound" and "darkness" to signal the process of "listening" with the eyes when "seeing" becomes useless as darkness falls.

== Work ==
=== Works in Korean ===
==== Poetry ====
- To the Roots (뿌리에게, 1991)
- The Words Stained the Leaves (그 말이 잎을 물들였다, 1994)
- It's Not That Far from Here (그곳이 멀지 않다, 1997)
- What Is Darkening (어두워진다는 것, 2001)
- A Missing Palm (사라진 손바닥, 2004)
- Wild Apple (야생사과, 2009)
- Time for These Horses To Return (말들이 돌아오는 시간, 2014)
- To Her (그녀에게, 2015)
- File Name: Lyric Poem (파일명 서정시, 2018)

==== Prose ====
- A Half-Bucket of Water (반통의 물, 1999)
- Where Does Purple Come From? (보랏빛은 어디에서 오는가, 2003)
- Remember Those Lights (저 불빛들을 기억해, 2012)
- A Plate of Poems (한 접시의 시, 2012)
- I'm Going To Get There on Foot Step by Step (한 걸음씩 걸어서 거기 도착하려네, 2017)

==== Compilations ====
- Morning Song, Evening Poetry (아침의 노래 저녁의 시, 2008)
- My Representative Poem (나의 대표시를 말한다, 2012)
- Na Huideok's Glass Bottle Letter (나희덕의 유리병 편지, 2013)

=== Works in English ===
- What Is Darkening (2007) - translated by Choi Jongyoll
- Scale and Stairs: Selected Poems (2009) - translated by Christopher Merrill and Kim Won-Chung
- Wild Apple (2015) - translated by William Parker and Youngsil Ji

== Awards ==
- Kim Suyeong Literary Award (1998)
- This Year's Young Artist Award (2001)
- Contemporary Literature Prize (2003)
- Isan Literature Prize (2005)
- Midang Literary Award (2014)
- Baeseok Literary Award (2019)
