= Kim Min-jeong (poet) =

South Korean poet and literary editor (born 1976)

Kim Min Jeong
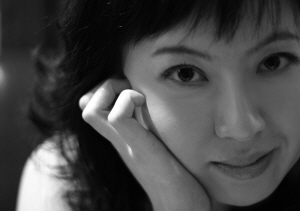
- Occupation: Writer
- Writing career
- Genre: Poetry

Kim Min Jeong (Korean: 김민정; born 1976) is a South Korean poet and literary editor.

== Biography ==
Kim Min Jeong was born in Incheon, South Korea in 1976. She studied creative writing at Chung-Ang University and also completed master's level coursework there. She began writing for a magazine in her third year of university and later joined Random House Korea as an editor. She edited the Random House series of poetry collections, which served as a springboard for South Korean Futurist poets and made a large impact on the country's poetry scene in the 2000s. As editor of the series, she discovered a number of young poets like Kim Kyung Ju and Hwang Byungsng. She became editor-in-chief at Random House Korea.

She made her literary debut in 1999 when Geomeun nanaui kkum (검은 나나의 꿈 Nana's Black Dream) and nine of her other poems won the Munye Joongang Literary Award for Best First Poem. In the 2000s, she became a well-known poet and a leading literary editor. She currently serves as the President of Nanda Books, an imprint of Munhakdongne, and edits Munhakdongne poetry series and novels.

Kim won the 8th Park In-Hwan Literary Award and 17th Weolgan Contemporary Poetry Award. She has produced and edited many unconventional works and bestsellers including poetry collections, literary essays, travelogues by writers, and special features. She also teaches university courses.

== Works ==
=== Poetry collections ===
1. 『날으는 고슴도치 아가씨』(열림원, 2005) { Flying Miss Hedgehog. Yolimwon, 2005. }

2. 『그녀가 처음, 느끼기 시작했다』(문학과지성사, 2009) { For the First Time, She Felt It. Moonji, 2009. }

3. 『아름답고 쓸모없기를』(문학동네, 2016) { Let It Be Beautiful and Useless. Munhakdongne, 2016. }

=== Essay collections ===
1. 『각설하고,』(한겨레출판사, 2013) { So Anyway,. Hanibook, 2013. }

=== Works in translation ===
1. Poems of Kim Yideum, Kim Haengsook & Kim Min Jeong (English)

2. Beautiful and Useless (English) Translated by Soeun Seo and Jake Levine

== Awards ==
1. 2007: 8th Park In-Hwan Literary Award

2. 2016: 17th Weolgan Contemporary Poetry Award
