= Hwang Byungsng =

South Korean poet (1970–2019)

Hwang Byung-seung
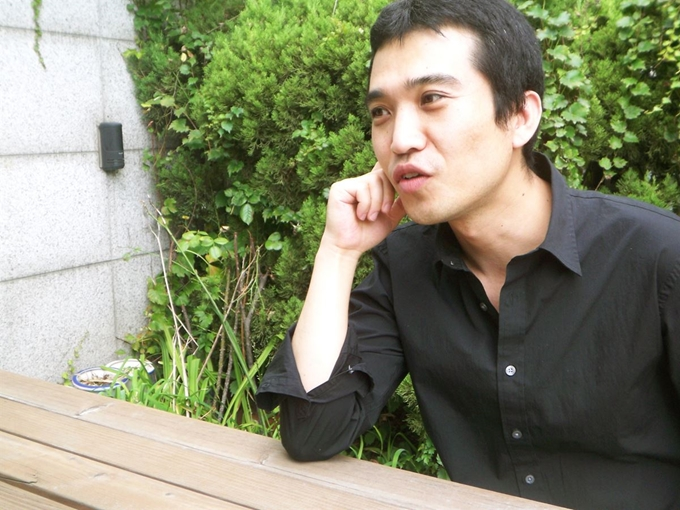
- Born: 4 April 1970; Seoul, South Korea
- Died: 24 July 2019 (aged 49); Goyang, South Korea
- Education: Seoul Institute of the Arts
- Occupation: Writer
- Writing career
- Genre: Poetry

Hwang Byung-seung (April 4 1970 – July 24 2019) was a South Korean poet. He studied creative writing at the Seoul Institute of the Arts and Chugye University for the Arts. He finished coursework in creative writing at Myongji Graduate School. Hwang is considered to have made a radical break from the lyric poetry tradition and introduced queer imagination, subcultural thinking, and stateless language to South Korean literature through the genderqueer voice of multisexual subjects.

== Life ==
Hwang Byung-seung was born in Seoul, South Korea, in 1970. He received a degree in creative writing at both the Seoul Institute of the Arts and Chugye University for the Arts. He finished masters-level coursework in creative writing at Myongji Graduate School. In 2003, "Juchiui h" (주치의h Primary Doctor h) and five other poems were published in Para 21, marking his literary debut. He has published three poetry collections to date: Yeojangnamja Sikoku (여장남자 시코쿠 Sikoku, the Man Dressed as Woman) (2005); Teuraekgwa deulpanui byeol (트랙과 들판의 별 Tracks and Stars in the Field) (2007); and Yukchaeshowa jeonjip (육체쇼와 전집 Body Show and Complete Works) (2013). In 2012, his work appeared in a special issue featuring Korean poetry ("Po&sie-Corée'") by the French poetry magazine Po&sie. He won the 11th Park In-Hwan Literary Award in 2010 and the 13th Midang Literary Award in 2013.

== Writing ==
Hwang Byung-seung's first poetry collection Yeojangnamja Sikoku (여장남자 시코쿠 Sikoku, the Man Dressed as Woman) was one of the most widely discussed books in South Korean literary circles during the 2000s. The collection was noted for its open display of desire and impulse, and for its abstract portrayal of objects and spaces. His poetic diction and voice were also very different from conventional Korean poetry. Critics would later describe him as "carrying out, through the play of signifiers, the near impossible work of restoring the world we lost to its original form" (Gwon Hyeok-ung) or as "a powerful detonator that will blow up the ideology of authenticity in modern Korean poetry and its tedious standards" (Lee Gwang-ho). On the other hand, Hwang has been criticized for using "language that does not communicate" and writing "incomprehensible poetry". As mixed opinions of his work continued to build, he became one of the most talked about poets in the 2000s.

As its title suggests, Hwang's first poetry collection explores queer themes and divided subjects by bringing to the forefront the "man dressed as a woman", a character of no clear gender. His second poetry collection Teuraekgwa deulpanui byeol (트랙과 들판의 별 Tracks and Stars in the Field) portrays the wanderings, rebellions, and romances of children who failed to grow up. In this sense, the collection takes readers to a strange fairy-tale world that defies the existing, adult world. Hwang uses a collage of imagery and juxtaposes various stories to powerful effect. Told in a unique format, the stories are ultimately a vast, ironical criticism of the real world at large. Hwang's third poetry collection Yukchaeshowa jeonjip (육체쇼와 전집 Body Show and Complete Works) sharply ridicules the existing social order, focusing on the idea of failure.

== Works ==
=== Poetry collections ===
- 『여장남자 시코쿠』(랜덤하우스, 2005) {Sikoku, the Man Dressed as Woman. Random House Korea, 2005.}
- 『트랙과 들판의 별』(문학과 지성, 2007) {Tracks and Stars in the Field. Moonji, 2007. }
- 『육체쇼와 전집』(문학과 지성, 2013) {Body Show and Complete Works. Moonji, 2013.}

=== Works in translation ===
- "Melancholy Walnut Pie" (English)
- "We Ate Cookies Together" (English)
- "Coming Out," "Sikoku, the Man Dressed as Woman," "Her Face Is a Battlefield," "Two Stillborn Hearts," "Fish Song" in Korea Poetry in Translation (English)

== Awards ==
- 2010: Park In-Hwan Literary Award
- 2013: Midang Literary Award
