= Jeong Jiyong Literature Prize =

South Korean poetry award

- Awarded for: Poetry
- Country: South Korea
- First award: 1989
- Website: https://jiyong.oc.go.kr

- Jeong Jiyong Literature Prize
- Hangul: 정지용문학상
- Hanja: 鄭芝溶文學賞
- RR: Jeong Jiyong munhaksang
- MR: Chŏng Chiyong munhaksang

Jeong Jiyong Literature Prize (Korean: 정지용문학상) is a South Korean literary award established in 1989 to recognize "poets and poetry" (시와 시학), as well as to commemorate the literary achievements of poet Jeong Jiyong (1902–1950). It selects the best poem of the year written by poets of medium standing. It awards the best poem based on how excellent and how easy to recite the poem is.

== Winners ==
Year	Work	Poet
1989	서한체(書翰體)	Park Dujin
1990	해변(海邊)가의 무덤	Kim Gwang Gyun
1991	작은 戀歌	Park Jeong Man
1992	龜龍寺詩篇. 겨울노래	Oh Sae-Young
1993	石榴	Lee Ga Lim
1994	큰 노래	Lee Seong Seon
1995	昇天	Lee Su-ik
1996	마음의 고향.6 -初雪	Lee Si-young
1997	白頭山 天池	Oh Takbeon
1998	세한도 가는 길	Yoo An-jin
1999	눈내리는 대숲 가에서	Song Soo-kwon
2000	하늘의 그물	Jeong Ho-seung
2001	등신불	Kim Jong-chul
2002	백학봉(白鶴峰).1	Kim Jiha
2003	낙산사 가는길 3	Yoo Kyung Hwan
2004	돌아가는 길	Moon Chung-hee
2005	세한도	Yoo Ja Hyo
2006	너를 사랑한다	Kang Eun-gyo
2007	아득한 성자	Cho Oh-hyun
2008	마음화상	Kim Cho Hye
2009	바이올린 켜는 여자	Do Jong-hwan
2010	발견의 기쁨	Lee Dong Soon
2011	왕인의 수염	Moon Hyo Chi
2012	옥상의 가을	Lee Sang Kook
2013	그리운 나무	Jeong Hui Seong
2014	풀꽃.2	Na Tae-joo
2015	사랑 세 쪽	Lee Geunbae
2016	국물	Shin Dalja
2017	시계	Kim Nam-jo
2018	그 손	Kim Kwang-kyu
2019	저녁이 올 때	Mun Tae-jun
