= Gongcho Literary Award =

The Gongcho Literary Award (Korean: 공초문학상) is a literary award established in 1993 by the Seoul Shinmun newspaper.

== Prizewinners ==
#	Year	Winner	Work
1	1993	Lee Hyeonggi	
2	1994	Park Nam-su	꿈의 물감
3	1995	Hong Yun-Sook	낙법
4	1996	Kim Yeo-jeong	호박덩이
5	1997	Bak Je-cheon	달항아리
6	1998	Shin Kyeong-nim	어머니와 할머니의 실루엣
7	1999	Oh Sae-young	집만이 집이 아니고
8	2000	Hi Tan	나무토막
9	2001	Chyung Jinkyu	순금(純金)
10	2002	Kim Jong-hae	풀, 풀2
11	2003	Kim Ji-ha	절, 그 언저리
12	2004	Chong Hyon-jong	경청
13	2005	Cheon Yang-hui	마음의 달
14	2006	Sung Chan-gyeong	마음과 얼굴
15	2007	Yi Suik	오체투지
16	2008	Cho Oh-hyun	아지랑이
17	2009	Shin Dal-ja	헛 눈물
18	2010	Lee Sungboo	백비(白碑)
19	2011	Chung Ho-sung	나는 아직 낙산사에 가지 못한다
20	2012	Do Jong-hwan	나무에 기대어
21	2013	Yoo An-jin	불타는 말의 기하학
22	2014	Ko Un	무제 시편 11
23	2015	Kim Yun-hee	오아시스의 거간꾼
24	2016	Na Tae-joo	돌멩이
25	2017	Kim Hu-ran	오아시스의 거간꾼
26	2018	Kim Cho-hye	멀고 먼 길
27	2019	Yoo Ja-hyo	거리
