= Jung Hee-sung =

South Korean poet and teacher (born 1945)

Jung Hee Sung (Korean: 정희성; born 1945) is a South Korean poet and teacher. He is one of the prominent poets to be associated with the Participation literary movement (also known as the Resistance movement) of the 1970s and 1980s in South Korea.

== Biography ==
Jung Hee Sung was born in Changwon, South Gyeongsang Province, South Korea. He attended Yongsan High School and studied Korean language and literature at Seoul National University. Following his graduation in 1968, he was drafted into the South Korean army. While he was serving in the army, his poem "Byeonsin" (변신 Transformation) won the Dong-a Ilbo New Writer's Contest in 1970, launching his literary career. When he completed his service that same year, he began working as a high school Korean Literature teacher while completing a master's program at Seoul National University. He belonged to a coterie of South Korean poets including Lee Kyu-ho and Kang Unkyo who collaborated in self-publishing a literary magazine called The Seventies. His early poems mainly drew inspiration from classical Korean texts, yet put a fresh spin on the mythical worlds they depicted. From the mid-1970s, he began to write works that condemned social problems, and today he is seen as one of South Korea's leading Resistance poets. He is not considered a prolific poet, with only six poetry collections spanning his five-decade career. In 2006, he was elected the 16th Chairman of the Writers Association of Korea.

== Writing ==
Many of Jung's early works play with the myths, legends, and hyangga poetry included in Samguk yusa, or Samguk yusa. His first poetry collection Dapcheong (답청 Treading on Grass in Spring) also uses similar motifs. Published in 1974, the collection provides new interpretations of old mythical worlds in careful and controlled verse. From the mid-1970s, he wrote a series of socially conscious poems to take a stand against the realities of the oppressive society and show his support for underprivileged groups and minorities. In particular, his 1978 collection Jeomun gange sabeul sitgo (저문 강에 삽을 씻고 Rinsing the Shovel in the Twilight River) consists of works that portray everyday scenes in great detail. These poems overcome the limits of Participation poetry, break free of fixed verse forms, and convey powerful emotions. Jeomun established Jung's reputation as a leading Participation (or Resistance) poet of the 1970s who carried on the legacy of Kim Soo-young and Sin Dong-yup (pioneers of Participation poetry in the 1960s), and who captured in his poems the energy and wholesomeness inherent in the everyday lives of ordinary people.

In 1991, 13 years after the publication of Jeomun, Jung's third collection was published, entitled Han geuriumi dareun geuriumege (한 그리움이 다른 그리움에게 One Longing to Another). His fourth collection, Sireul chajaseo (詩를 찾아서 In Search of Poetry), was released in 2001.

== Works ==
=== Poetry collections ===
- 《답청》(샘터사, 1974) { Treading on Grass in Spring. Samtoh, 1974. }
- 《저문 강에 삽을 씻고》(창작과비평사, 1978) { Rinsing the Shovel in the Twilight River. Changbi, 1978. }
- 《한 그리움이 다른 그리움에게》(창작과비평사, 1991) { One Longing to Another. Changbi, 1991. }
- 《詩를 찾아서》(창작과비평사, 2001) { In Search of Poetry. Changbi, 2001. }
- 《돌아다보면 문득》(창비, 2008) { What Hits You When You Look Back. Changbi, 2008. }
- 《그리운 나무》(창비, 2013) { A Tree I Miss. Changbi, 2013. }

=== Works in translation ===
- "Floral Tribute Song" and other poems, Asia journal, Winter 2013

== Awards ==
- 1981: Kim Suyeong Literary Award
- 1997: Poetry and Poetics Award
- 2001: Manhae Prize
- 2013: Jung Jiyong Literature Prize
