= Kim Chong Kwang =

South Korean author (born 1971)

Kim Chong Kwang (Korean: 김종광, born 1971, in Boryeong City (also known as Daecheon), South Chungcheong Province, South Korea.) is a South Korean author. Kim's writings are extremely diverse, encompassing multiple genres and audiences, ranging from children to adults. His novels are typically set in farming villages and he actively uses the regional dialect from his hometown of the South Chungcheong Province, highlighting his writing's use of witty dialogue. His writings preserve the characters’ direct styles of speech to their fullest extent and directly express the voices of society's minority groups.

== Life ==
At five-years-old Kim went to a friend's house and read Lee Oisoo's short story, "Deulgae" (들개 Stray Dog) and resolved to become a novelist. With the money that his father, a farmer, earned from selling a cow, he entered the Department of Creative Writing at Chung-Ang University. He wrote poetry for his department's literary coterie magazine, Jagin. He worked at various magazine companies and publishing agencies after graduating from college, but after incurring a large amount of debt, he returned to his hometown in the fall of 1998 and began to work for public utilities offices. In the same year, he published his short story, “Gyeongchalseoyeo, annyeong” (경찰서여, 안녕 Goodbye, Police) in the literary magazine Munhak Dongne and began officially writing. He later proceeded to win the Korea JoongAng Daily New Writer's Award in 2000 for his piece, "Haeroga" (해로가 By Sea).

In 2001, he received the Shin Dong-yup Artist's Grant (신동엽창작기금) and in 2008, received the Violet Novel Award of the People (제비꽃서민소설상). From 2004 to 2006, he served as the Secretary General of the Writers Association of Korea. In 2009, with a thesis titled, "Cheongsonyeonsoseorui changjakbangbeomnon yeongu" (청소년소설의 창작방법론 연구 Research on the Methodology of Creation for Youth Novels), he received his Master's degree from Chung-Ang University and finished his PhD coursework at the same institution.

== Writing ==
Kim Chong Kwang himself has classified his writings into four general themes: reportage on disappearing farming villages and rural life; reports on the so-called "New Generation" of people that were born in the early half of the 1970s; the study of literary institutions; an exploration of the irrational tendencies of the masses. In some instances, variations of multiple themes appear within a single work.

=== Rural novels ===
Rural novels on farming villages constitute the majority of his novelistic works. His first short story collection, the 2000 work Gyeongchalseoyeo, annyeong, emphasizes that rural life is not an outdated relic of the past but a part of contemporary reality. His 2002 short story collection, Monaegi beulluseu (모내기 블루스 Rice Planting Blues) continues this theme by vividly and deftly portraying the diverse forms of life within rural areas. His 2018 collection, Nolleo gajagoyo (놀러 가자고요 Let's Go Play), is a story about a farmer that, like the author's own father, always tried his absolute best throughout his life.

In general, most rural novels describe local sentiments and farmers’ emotions against a rural background, but Kim Chong Kwang's novels go further by paying attention to the history of farming communities. By finding the power of life within the abundant stories of the shabby and old, he does not merely focus on the remorse and sorrow that encircles farming villages slowly fading away. His rural novels, in which he frequently utilizes the Chungnam dialect, also regularly invoke comparisons with those of Lee Mun-gu, another novelist from Boryeong City.

=== Reports on the 1970s ===
Kim's interest in exploring the lives of those that, like him, were also born in the 1970s began with the publication of his 2002 novel, 71nyeonsaeng daini (71년생 다인이 Born in 1971, Dain). A younger student belonging to the "Class of 1990" impersonates the student activism embodied by the students in the 1980s—during the democratization movements throughout South Korea—by holding a seemingly anachronistic protest. Through a “series of linked novels,” the author subdivides the lives of those born in the 1970s by generation and explores them in a deeper fashion. His 2004 novel, Yasaljaengirok 1~2 (야살쟁이록1~2 Records of an Impertinent Person: Volumes 1 and 2), tells the story of a person born in 1970. The novel follows them in their troubled high school years and takes place in a village in Seohae, South Chungcheong Province from 1987 to 1989. His 2008 novel, Cheotgyeongheom (첫경험 First Experience), depicts political, economic, and cultural changes unfolding in the fringes of Seoul through the story of a troubled college student from 1990 to 1997. His 2010 novel, Gundaeiyagi (군대이야기 Army Story), centers around a young man born in 1974 and a young woman born in 1976 to explore the events of the years between 1995 and 1997.

=== Exploring the contradictions of the masses ===
His 2008 novel, Jugeumui haniljeon (죽음의 한일전 The Japan-Korea Sports Match of Death), best represents Kim's thematic exploration of the contradiction of the masses. The novel focuses on six main protagonists that all belong to the upper class but are, nevertheless, all hypocrites in some way or another. His 2012 novel, Ttonggae haengjingok (똥개 행진곡 March of the Mutts), was first serialized in Literature Webzine Ppul and described as an "allegorical fantasy where dogs and humans become entangled and intertwined." The dogs in the novel are able to communicate with humans and even have their own social order and system. The novel cheerfully explores humanity's falsehoods and antinomies while contemplating the way fascism becomes insidiously embedded within daily life in a satirical manner.

=== A contemplation of literature ===
His 2006 novel, Nakseomunhaksa (The Literary History of Books on Music), is a linked series on literature on music and an expansion of the concept of nakseo (낙서 樂書 "writings on music") that originally featured in the short story, "Eollonnakseobaegiljang (언론낙서백일장 A Literary Contest for Music Writing )" that was published in his 2002 novel, Monaegi beulluseu. He was deeply impressed by his experience of reading Yi Sang munhak jeonjip (이상문학전집 The Complete Collection of Yi Sang’s Works), where a character that insists on the importance of literature on music prematurely dies. He thereafter demonstrates the process through which the character is venerated and how the literary imagination is exhausted by capitalism. Refusing to limit himself to problems attributed within the literary circle, Kim interrogates the concept of literature itself through examining the relationship between the author and the work, the author and the reader.

=== The adaptation of historical realities ===
Kim Chong Kwang has written two novels based on real historical events. His 2014 novel, Wangja iu (왕자 이우 Prince Yi U), uses historical realities that are left behind in a fragmentary manner to restore the life of Prince Yi U, "the last pride" of the Joseon Dynasty, in fictional form. His 2017 work, Joseontongsinsa 1–2 (조선통신사 1~2 Joseon Ambassadors Volumes 1 and 2), is a historical novel without any monarchs, feudal lords, generals, or explicit heroes and heroines and instead focuses on that represents an ambassador as they travel back and forth between Japan and Korea.

=== Interest in Bak Jiwon ===
His 2007 novel, Yullyeo nagwonguk 1~2 (율려낙원국1~2 Music and the Country of Paradise: Volumes 1 and 2), is a parody of Bak Jiwon's traditional Korean novel, Heo Saengjeon (허생전 The Biography of Heo Saeng), and portrays the titular character, Heo Saeng, after he eliminates all thieves and constructs a utopia. The author classifies this work as "a parody of a traditional novel, and real fantasy." The author has written a total of three books on Bak Jiwon, all of them written with children in mind as the target readers. Out of these, his 2014 book, Joseonui nageune Jang Boki (조선의 나그네 장복이The Joseon Traveler, Jang Boki), is told from the perspective of a young boy servant that travels together with Bak Jiwon to China under Qing dynasty rule.

=== Youth novels ===
Kim has also written a number of novels aimed at younger readers, such as the 2008 Cheoeum yeonae (처음 연애 First Love) and the 2015 Byeoruibyeol (별의 별 Star of Stars), where he portrays youth that were born in the 1970s. His young adult novels are distinguished by his panoramic view of various youth as their wanderings and love are forced to fit the conditions and circumstances of their era. His 2009 novel, Chakan daehwa (착한 대화 Good-Natured Conversation), is composed almost entirely of dialogue and attempts to explore what being "good-natured," so prized for adults, precisely refers to and thus criticizes the hypocrisy of the older generation.

== Works ==
=== Short story collections ===
《경찰서여, 안녕》, 문학동네, 2000. / Gyeongchalseoyeo, annyeong (Goodbye, Police), Munhak dongne, 2000.

《모내기 블루스》, 창비, 2002. / Monaegi beulluseu (Rice Planting Blues), Changbi, 2002.

《짬뽕과 소주의 힘》, 이가서, 2003. / Jjampponggwa sojuui him (The Power of Spicy Seafood Noodle Soup and Soju), Igaseo, 2003.

《낙서문학사》, 문학과지성사, 2006. / Nakseomunhaksa (The Literary History of Books on Music), Moonji, 2006.

《처음의 아해들》, 문학동네, 2010. / Cheoeumui ahaedeul (First Children), Munhak dongne, 2010.

《전당포를 찾아서》, 아시아, 2014. / Jeondangporeul chajaseo (The Pawnshop Chase), ASIA Publishers, 2014.

《학생댁 유씨씨》, 테오리아, 2016. / Haksaengdaek yussissi (The Student House of Mr. Yoo), Theoria, 2016.

《놀러 가자고요》, 작가정신, 2018. / Nolleo gajagoyo (Let's Go Play), Jakka jungsin, 2018.

=== Serial novels ===
《처음 연애》, 사계절, 2008. / Cheoeum yeonae (First Love), Sakyejul 2008.

《착한 대화》, 문학과지성사, 2009. / Chakan daehwa (Good-Natured Conversation), Moonji, 2009.

《광장시장 이야기》, 샘터사, 2012. / Gwangjangsijang iyagi (Stories of Gwangjang Market), Saemteosa, 2012.

=== Novels ===
《71년생 다인이》, 작가정신, 2002.(2011년 개정판 출간) / 71nyeonsaeng daini (Born in 1971, Dain), Jakka jungsin, 2002 (re-issued in 2011).

《야살쟁이록1~2》, 우리교육, 2004. / Yasaljaengirok 1~2 (Records of an Impertinent Person: Volumes 1 and 2), Uriedu, 2004.

《율려 낙원국1~2》, 예담, 2007. / Yullyeo nagwonguk 1~2 (Music and the Country of Paradise: Volumes 1 and 2), Yedam, 2007.

《첫경험》, 열림원, 2008. / Cheotgyeongheom (First Experience), Yolimwon, 2008.

《죽음의 한일전》, 중앙북스, 2008. / Jugeumui haniljeon (The Japan-Korea Sports Match of Death), Joongang Books, 2008.

《군대이야기》, 자음과모음, 2010. / Gundaeiyagi (Army Story), Jaeumgwa moeum, 2010.

《똥개 행진곡》, 뿔, 2012. / Ttonggae haengjingok (March of the Mutts), Ppul, 2012.

《왕자 이우》, 다산책방, 2014. / Wangja iu (Prince Yi U), Dasan Books, 2014.

《별의별》, 문학과지성사, 2015. / Byeoruibyeol (Star of Stars), Moonji, 2015.

《조선통신사 1~2》, 다산책방, 2017. / Joseontongsinsa 1–2 (Joseon Ambassadors 1–2), Dasan Books, 2017.

=== Essay collections ===
《사람을 공부하고 너를 생각한다》, 교유서가, 2017. / Sarameul gongbuhago neoreul saenggakanda (In Studying People, I Came to Think of You), Gyoyu seoga, 2017.

《웃어라, 내 얼굴》, 작가정신, 2018. / Useora, nae eolgul (Laugh, My Face), Jakka jungsin, 2018.

=== Children's books ===
《박지원》, 주니어파랑새, 2002. / Bak Jiwon (Bak Jiwon), Junieo parangsae, 2002.

《박씨부인전》, 창비, 2003. / Bakssibuinjeon (The Story of Madame Park), Changbi, 2003.

《임진록》, 창비, 2009. / Imjillok (Record of the Imjin War), Changbi, 2009.

《박지원》, 비룡소, 2011. / Bak Jiwon (Bak Jiwon), BIR, 2011.

《흥부놀부전》, 주니어김영사, 2012. / Heungbunolbujeon (The Story of Heungbu and Nolbu), Junior Gimm Young, 2012.

《임경업전》, 주니어김영사, 2013. / Imgyeongeopjeon (The Story of Im Gyeongeop), Junior Gimm Young, 2013.

《삽교별집》, 주니어김영사, 2014. / Sapgyobyeoljip (An Seokgyeong's Collection of Writings), Junior Gimm Young, 2014. Thunder Bridge Separate/Divided House

《조선의 나그네 장복이》, 샘터사, 2014. / Joseonui nageune Jang Boki (The Joseon Traveler, Jang Boki), Saemteosa, 2014.

=== Anthologies ===
강화길, 권지예, 김종광 외, 《멜랑콜리 해피엔딩》, 작가정신, 2019./ Mellangkolli haepiending (Melancholy Happy Ending), Jakka jungsin, 2019.

== Works in translation ==
《전당포를 찾아서》, 아시아, 2014. / The Pawnshop Chase, Asia Publishers, 2014.

== Awards ==
Munhak Dongne Literary Contest (《문학동네》 문예공모, 1998)

Korea JoongAng Daily New Writer's Award (2000)

Daesan Artist's Grant (대산창작기금, 2000).

Shin Dong-yup Artist's Grant (신동엽창작기금, 2001).

Violet Novel Award of the People (제비꽃서민소설상, 2008).

Korea Creative Content Agency Creative Support Grant (우수출판콘텐츠제작지원사업, 2015)

GyeongGi Cultural Foundation Professional Artists’ Creative Support Fund (경기문화재단 전문예술창작지원사업, 2016).

== Further reading and external links ==
See the entry for Kim Chong Kwang in the Naver Dictionary of Contemporary Korean Literature: https://terms.naver.com/entry.nhn?docId=986452&cid=41708&categoryId=41737

Kim, Mijeong. “To Those in an Acute State of Chaos.” Sisain, 2 July 2010. https://www.sisain.co.kr/news/articleView.html?idxno=7742.

Son, Mingyu. “Kim Chong Kwang, ‘If Prince Yi U Had Survived, Would Our Nation Have Been Divided?’” Channel Yes, 28 February 2014. http://ch.yes24.com/Article/View/24558

Yun, Heungsik. “‘The Minutiae of the Humble and Lowly.’” Munahk News, 27 December 2017. http://munhaknews.com/?p=12469

Im, Nari. “Kim Chong Kwang : ‘Living as a Novelist for 20 Years, Selling Off My Family.’” Channel Yes, 23 October 2017. http://ch.yes24.com/Article/View/34517

Hong, Seongsik. “ ‘The 90s Are Not Merely Disillusionment and Despair.’” OhmyNews, 12 July 2002.

http://www.ohmynews.com/NWS_Web/View/at_pg.aspx?CNTN_CD=A0000081186

Hong, Seongsik. “Novelist Kim Chong Kwang and His ‘Theory of One Month, One Million Won.’” OhmyNews, 30 December 2003. http://m.ohmynews.com/NWS_Web/Mobile/at_pg.aspx%5C?CNTN_CD=A0000114690%5B%5D

“With Unhindered Words, Exposing Farm Villages with Humor.” Chosun Ilbo, 5 October 2018. http://news.chosun.com/site/data/html_dir/2018/10/05/2018100500178.html

“An Interview with Author Kim Chong Kwang, Author of Chakan daehwa.” Moonji Publishers Youtube Channel, 16 February 2010. https://www.youtube.com/watch?v=IPd5zCtkHs8

Kim, Gyeonguk, Insuk Kim, et al. To Live as a Novelist. Munsa, 2011.

Kim, Yongtaek, Jonghwan Do, Gwija Yang, Sunwon Lee. Lessons. Hwangso, 2010.

Son, Honggyu. Friendly Prejudices. Gyoyu Books, 2015.

O, Changeun. “The Passionate Fervor Radiating from Peripheral Glances.” The Quarterly Changbi, Winter (2002): 362–70.

Yun, Jigwan. “Memory’s Dwellings.” The Quarterly Changbi, Autumn (2000): 331–339.

Han, Gi. “Literature of Humorous and Brazen Words: The Novels of Lee Mun-gu and Kim Chong Kwang.” Munye Joongang, Spring (2001): 75–89.

Hwang, Dogyeong. “A Bundle of Flowers Floating Above Time’s River.” Munhak Dongne, Winter (2006): 545–564.
