= Ko Won =

Korean-American poet (1925–2008)

Ko Sungwon (Korean: 고성원; December 8, 1925 – January 20, 2008) better known by his pen name Ko Won (고원), was a poet, translator, and scholar. He came to America in 1964 and devoted his entire life to the cross-cultural movement between Korea and America.

== Biography ==
Ko Won was born on Dec. 8th, 1925, in Youngdong, Korea, as the only son of Ko Myungchel, father, and Kwon Youngsoon, mother. He studied Korean literature and English literature from Dongguk University and English at Queen Mary College, University of London by becoming a scholarship recipient of UNESCO (1956).

Ko came to America in 1964 to continue his studies at the University of Iowa, where he received an M.F.A. in Poetry (1965) and, as a bilingual poet, became the winner of the Kansas City Star Award for Poetry (1966). He earned a Ph. degree in Comparative Literature from New York University (1974)

Ko taught Comparative Literature at Brooklyn College of CUNY (1974–1977) and published Meeloo-namu, the sixth of his poetry collection, by Overseas Korean Journal (1976) and a scholarly publication, Buddhist Elements in Dada by The New York University Press (1977). After moving to LA, he taught at the University of California, Riverside (1987–1992) and the University of La Verne, CA. (1992-2006).

Ko's literary life began with A Station with No Timetable/시간표 없는 정거장 by Bridged Culture publisher, Seoul (1952), and since then published various works of his poetry or essay collections, translations of Korean poetry, and scholarly books and essays. Contemporary Korean Poetry, the anthology of twentieth Korean poetry, introduced 184 poems, written by 141 Korean poets, and scholars and translators often accept it as the first scholarly publication of Korean poetry into English. His insight and philosophy about translation is well presented in his essay, "Problems in Translating Korean Poetry" from Translation, published by Columbia University (1977)

From 1986 to 2008, Ko served as director of Gulmaru Institute of Literature and editor-and-publisher of The Literary Realm/Munhak segye. he was awarded the Korean-American Literature Award from the Korean-American Literature Association (1993), the Lifetime Achieve Award from the Korean Language Association, Korea (1997) and the Overseas Korean Literature Award from the Korean Literature Association, Korea (2006). Ko Won's spouse, Ko Youngah, and their grown-up son and daughter live in LA.

=== Published Works ===
- Korean Verses. Seoul: The Korean Poets Association, 1961.
- Buddhist Elements in Dada. NYC: The New York University Press, 1977.
- "Problems in Translating Korean Poetry." Translation. NYC: Columbia University, 1977. 110-114.
- The Complete Literary Works of Ko Won. Seoul: Calm Morning, 2006.
- Contemporary Korean Poetry. Iowa City: The Iowa University Press. 1970.
- South Korean Poets of Resistance. Merrick: Cross-Cultural Communications. 1980.
- The Turn of Zero. Merrick: Cross-Cultural Communications. 1974;2004.
- Voices in Diversity. Merrick: Cross-Cultural Communications. 2001.
- Additionally, 15 books of Ko Won's collected Korean poetry and Sijo, traditional Korean poetry, were published in Seoul, Korea.

=== Awards ===
- Korean-American Literature Award from the Korean-American Literature Association (1993)
- Lifetime Achieve Award from the Korean Language Society, Korea (1997)
- Overseas Korean Literature Award from the Writers Association of Korea, Korea (2006)
