= Lee Si-young (disambiguation) =

Lee Si-young may also refer to:

- Yi Si-yeong (1868–1953), South Korean politician who served as the first vice president
- Lee Si-young (poet) (born 1950), South Korean writer
- Lee Si-young (born 1982), South Korean actress
- Lee Si-young (footballer) (born 1997), South Korean footballer
