= Ashraf Dali =

Egyptian poet, novelist and journalist

Ashraf Dali (Ashraf Aboul-Yazid) is an Egyptian poet, novelist and journalist. He was born in Banha (also spelt Benha), Egypt on March 13, 1963. He is the Secretary General of the Congress African Journalists (CAJ). Ashraf Dali won the Manhae Prize in Literature 2014. Since 1989, when his first book of poetry was published, Ashraf Aboul-Yazid (Ashraf Dali) has been keen to introduce himself as a man of words. He won the Arab Journalism Award in Culture, in 2015, given by Dubai Press Club, UAE, for his work published in Al-Arabi magazine, The Art of Miniature in Literature, History and Myth.

Some of his literary works are translated into Spanish, Korean, German, Sindhi, Urdu, Serbian, Azerbaijani, Russian, Turkish, English and Persian. Selected poems were also translated into Hindi, and Italian. He has published his travels to more than 37 countries in Al-Arabi magazine, and other cultural periodicals.

Dali has participated in cultural international conferences held in Egypt, Spain, Columbia, Venezuela, Italy, Germany, Russia, Costa Rica, Syria, Yemen, UAE, Kuwait, Morocco, Saudi Arabia, Oman and the Republic of Korea.

He introduced many figures of literature from 50 countries including South Korea, Russia and India to Arab viewers in his TV program ([The Other]). He authored and translated 45 books, including three volumes of Korean poetry; 'One Thousand & One Lives, An Anthology of Selected Poems' by the Korean Poet Ko Un), 'Qeddison Youhalleqo Baaidan (The Far-off Saint), Translated Poems' by the Korean Poet Cho Oh-hyun and Love Letters by Manhae. Since March 2009, he has been writing weekly adventures to introduce the Silk Road cities and civilizations to Arab children.

== Works ==
=== Books published in Arabic ===
==== Poetry ====
- Washwashat Al Bahr, (The Whisper of the Sea), Poetry, Cairo, 1989.
- Al Asdaf, (The Shells), Poetry, Cairo, 1996.
- Zakirat Al Samt, (The Memory of Silence), Poetry, Beirut, 2000.
- Fawqa Sirat Al Mawt, (On the Passage of Death), Poetry, Cairo, 2001.
- Zakirat Al Farashat, (The Memory of Butterflies), Poetry, Cairo, 2005.

==== Novels ====
- Shamawes, (Novel), Dar Al-Ain, Cairo, 2008
- Hadiqa Khalfeyya (A Backyard Garden), (Novel), Maktabat Al-Mashareq, Cairo, 2011
- (31), (Novel), Maktabat Al-Mashareq, Cairo, 2011

==== Criticism and biographies ====
- Sirat Al Lawn, (the Story of Color), Art Criticism, Cairo, 2003.
- Muzakkrat Musafer, The Memories of a Traveler, Biography on Al-Sheikh Mustafa Abdul Razik travels to France, Abu Dhabi, UAE, 2004.
- Al Shiekh Mustafa AbdulRaziq Musaferan wa Muqiman,( (Al Azhar Sheikh Travels and Memories at home ), Travels, Cairo, 2006.
- The Story of an Artist Who Lived 5000 Years, History of Art for Children, Cairo 2006.
- The Arab World Kids, Poems for Children, Kuwait, 2006.
- Sirat Musafer (A Traveler tale), Travels, Cairo, 2008
- Abath al Shabab (The Joy of the Youth), Bayrem Al-Tunsi papers in Tunisia, Alexandria Bibliotheca, 2008
- The Arab Travelers (Rahhalatol Arab), for children, Kuwait, 2009
- The Sea Post Fish Poetic story for Children, Kuwait, 2011.
- Shurali (The Carpenter and the Evil of the Forest), a folk tale by the Tatar poet Abdullah Tukay, for Children, Kuwait, 2011
- The Sheep and the Goat, a folk tale by the Tatar poet Abdullah Tukay, for Children, Kuwait, 2013
- Non Anniswa, Nahrol-Fan, Feminine N, River of Art, Biography, Dar Al-Hilal, Cairo 2013
- The Silk Road (A Cultural Pictorial Encyclopedia), Alexandria Bibliotheca, 2013
- Ariver on Travel, travels, Al-Arabi books, Kuwait, 2015

==== Translations ====
- Korean Folk Tales, for Children, Al-Arabi Books, Kuwait, 2008
- I and Surrealism, Salvador Dalí,(Biography), Dubai Thaqafeyya magazine, UAE, 2010
- One Thousand & One Lives, An Anthology of Selected Poems Written by the Korean Poet Ko Un), Dubai Thaqafeyya magazine, UAE, 2012
- Qeddison Youhalleqo Baaidan (The Far-off Saint), Translated Poems Written by the Korean Poet Cho O-hyun, Bait-Alghasham, Muscat, Oman, 2013

=== Books published in other languages ===
- Shamawes, (Novel), (Korean), Seoul, South Korea, 2008
- Una calle en el Cairo, (A street in Cairo), Poetry, translated by Nadia Gamaleddin, (Spanish), Costa Rica, 2010.
- Anthology, Poetry, (Turkish), translated ny Metin Fendcgi, Istanbul, Turkey, 2012.
- The Memory of Silence, Poetry, (English), Cairo, 2013
- The memory of Butterflies, Poetry, translated by Nesrin Shakibi Mumtaz,(Persian), Dar Afraz, Tehran, 2013

Work career posts:

- The AsiaN, Arabic version, Editor-in-chief, since 2012.
- Al Arabi magazine, Senior Editor, Kuwait, since 2002.
- Reuters, cultural editor, Cairo, 2001 – 2002.
- Adab wa Naqd (Literature & Criticism) magazine, editor and art director, Cairo, 2001 – 2002
- Nizwa magazine, editor and art director, Oman, 1998 - 2001
- Arabian Advertising Agency, editor and art director, Oman, 1992 – 1998
- Al Manar Magazine, editor and translator, Cairo, 1990 – 1991.
- In his TV program "The Other", he has interviews with more than 90 literary and artistic figures from almost 50 non-Arab countries to Arab viewers, telecasted in Kuwaiti TV channels, 2010-2012
