= Kang Eun-gyo =

South Korean poet (born 1945)

- Born: December 13, 1945 (age 80); Hongwon County, North Hamgyong Province, Soviet Civil Administration
- Education: Yonsei University - Ph.D.
- Occupations: Professor of Korean Literature, Author
- Writing career
- Language: Korean
- Period: 1968-Present
- Genre: Nihilism
- Notable works: Arise, Blade of Grass
- Notable awards: Korean Literature Award, Contemporary Literature Prize
- Movement: People's Poetry

Korean name
- Hangul: 강은교
- Hanja: 姜恩喬
- RR: Gang Eungyo
- MR: Kang Ŭn'gyo

Kang Eun-gyo (Korean: 강은교; born December 13, 1945) is a South Korean poet and Professor Emerita at Dong-a University.

== Life ==
Kang Eun-gyo was born on December 13, 1945, in Hongwon, Hamgyeongnam-do. She was raised in Seoul, and graduated from Gyeonggi Girls' Middle School and Gyeonggi Girls' High School. She went on to earn her bachelor's degree in English Literature and Ph.D. in Korean Literature from Yonsei University. Kang has a daughter. She made her literary debut with the publication of "Night of the Pilgrims" (Sullyejaui bam), which earned her the 1968 New Writer Prize, sponsored by the journal World of Thoughts (Sasanggye). She was a member of the coterie that published The Seventies (Chilsimnyeondae) along with Kim Hyeong-yeong, Yoon Sang-gyu, Lim Jeong-nam, and Jung Hui-seong. She is at present a professor of Korean Literature at Dong-a University. House of Nothingness (Heomujip), Diary of a Pauper (Binjailgi), House of Noises (Sorijib), Red River (Bulgeun gang), Song of the Wind (Baram norae), Song of Sadness (Seulpeun norae), and Letter in the Wall (Byeoksogui pyeonji) are her most significant poetry collections. Kang was also the recipient of the Korean Writer's Prize and the Contemporary Literature (Hyundae Munhak) Award.

== Work ==
In her early career Kang utilized nihilism as a point of departure from which to blueprint a future of free thought and equality between men. In response to the government's violations of human rights and fundamental liberties during the late 1960s, the poet struggled to map a new path opposed to persecution and oppression; her works contained a measure of hope at the same time despairing at the then social and political situation. This focus resulted in Kang's name being associated with the "people's poetry" movement.

Kang was also in the camp of 'lyrical' (as opposed to 'ontological) poets like Heu Young-ja, Chung Jin-kyu, Lee Keun-bae, Kim Huran, Oh Tak-bon, Yoo An-jin, Park E-dou, Ra Tae-joo, Lee Soo-ik, Song Soo-kwon, Oh Sae-young, Lee Geon-cheong, Kim Jong-hae, Shin Dalja, Lim Young-jo, Lee Sung-sun, Moon Chung-hee, Kim Hyeong-young, Cho Jeong-kwon, Hong Shin-seon, Sin Dae-chul, Kim Jong-hae, Kim Jong-chul, Lee Garim, Kim Seung-hee, Lee Jun-gwan, Lee kee-chul, Cho Chang-whan, and Yoon Suk-san

Kang's poem "Blades of Grass" (Pullip) demonstrated her concern and affection for the powerful forces of life that shape communities and override any human machinations, including governments. Her later work, less dark and tragic than her previous poetry, contains optimism for the future while it still acknowledges the problems of the social conditions of the time. "Blades of Grass, Arise" (Ireoseora pura), one of her most famous poems, uses the vitality and resiliency of grass as a metaphor for the powerful will of life that exists in all mankind. In "I Await You Again Today" (Oneuldo neoreul gidarinda), the commonplace, ordinary "you" gains a new significance; "you" becomes an entity that has a brilliance in and of itself. Her later works, with their soulful attention to the glory of life and earnest quest for its meaning, place her in the school of poetry known as 'People's Poetry'. Yet, as Kang's early poetry appropriated and altered the nihilistic school of thought, her later poetry also changed the standards of the "People's Poetry" school. While much of the rest of "people's poetry" has been criticized for only offering simplistic, normative perspectives of social reality, Kang's poetry achieved a remarkable balance between the tangible and the abstract, the real and the ideal.

== Awards ==
- 2011 Yousim Literature Prize - Poetry
- 2006 Jeong Jiyong Literature Prize
- Sowol Poetry Award of Excellence
- 1992 Contemporary Literature (Hyundae Munhak) Award
- 1975 Korean Writer's Prize
- 1968 Sasanggye Newcomer's Literary Prize

== Works in Translation ==
None to date

== Works in Korean (Partial) ==
Poetry

- House of Nothingness (Heomujip 1971)
- Diary of a Pauper (Binjailgi 1977)
- House of Noises (Sorijib 1982)
- Song of the Wind (Baram norae 1987)
- I Await You Again Today (Oneuldo neoreul gidarinda 1989)
- Letter in the Wall (Byeoksogui pyeonji 1992)
- A Day on a Star (Eoneu byeoleseo ui haru 1996)
- One lamp is coming (Deungbul hanaga geoleo-onda 1999)
- Time goes about with a silver star in its pocket (Siganeun jumeoni-e eunbit byeol hana neot-go danyeotda 2002)
- The Green Spider's Love (Chorok geomi-ui sarang 2006)
- Song of Sadness (Seulpeun norae)

Anthologies

- Blades of Grass (Pullip 1974)
- Red River (Bulgeun gang 1984)
- We Become Water (Uri-ga mul-i doe-eo 1986)
- You are a Deep Deep River (Geudae-neun gip-eun gang 1991)

Prose

- Between that Water (Geumul sai-ro 1975)
- My Memories (Chueokje 1975)
- Children of the City (Dosi-ui ai-deul 1977)
- If We Met as Water (Uri-ga mul-i doe-eo mannatda-myeon 1980)
- Who Wakes Up Again from Blades of Grass (Nu-ga pullip-euro dasi nuntteurya 1984)
- Falling Asleep while not actually being able to fall asleep (Jamdeulmyeonseo cham-euro jamdeulji mot hamyeonseo 1993)
- The Empty Notebook (Heomu sucheop 1996)

== See also ==
- List of Korean-language poets
