= New Russian Word =

American Russian-language newspaper

- Type: Weekly newspaper
- Owner(s): Novoye Russkoye Slovo Publishing Inc.
- Founded: April 15, 1910
- Ceased publication: December 11, 2010
- ISSN: 0730-8949

New Russian Word (Russian: Новое русское слово) was a Russian language newspaper published in New York City. It was in print from 1910 to 2010. The newspaper reported on daily news and works of art by Russian immigrants.

== History ==
The first issue of the newspaper was published on April 15, 1910. Until 1920, the newspaper was published under the name Russian Word. To this end, the New Russian Word (first issue August 20, 1920) is the world's oldest continuously published newspaper in Russian.

Until April 10, 2009, the newspaper was published daily, then switched to a weekly format. At the same time, a special feature appeared where the New Russian Word produced Russian translations of articles from The New York Times.

Since the 1930s the New Russian Word was the largest Russian-language periodical in the United States. In 1921, the circulation was 32.4 thousand copies, and in 1976, it was 26 thousand. In 2006, it was 150 thousand. According to N. A. Borodin, the newspaper was "undoubtedly the most decent and skillfully led Russian newspaper in America".

The newspaper was also a part of the World Congress of Russian Press as well as the World Association of Russian Press.

In the 1990s the newspaper had the largest circulation among the foreign-language press in the United States, even ahead of Spanish-language publications. During these years, Konstantin Kuzminsky, Vladimir Kozlovsky, Gennady Katsov, Alexander Genis, Mikhail Epshtein and others worked with the newspaper.

From 2006 to 2008 the weekly version of the newspaper was published in Moscow for distribution in Russia and other countries of the former USSR.

On April 10, 2009, the last daily issue was released and the newspaper began to appear as a weekly published in conjunction with the New York Times on Fridays. In April 2010 the 100th anniversary of the newspaper was solemnly celebrated in New York.

Before its closure in 2010 the newspaper, together with the editors of Novy Zhurnal, became the founder of the O. Henry Gift of the Magi Literary Prize.

In November 2010 it was officially announced that the publication of the newspaper was suspended.
