= Kim Hu-ran =

Korean poet (born 1934)

- 김후란
- Born: December 26, 1934 (age 91); Keijō, Korea, Empire of Japan
- Occupation: Journalist
- Writing career
- Language: Korean

Korean name
- Hangul: 김후란
- Hanja: 金后蘭
- RR: Gim Huran
- MR: Kim Huran

Kim Hu-ran (Korean: 김후란; born December 26, 1934) is a Korean poet. She is also known by her art name Hyeongdeok.

== Biography ==
Kim was born in Seoul on December 26, 1934. Her professional career has been in journalism; she served as a reporter then as editorial writer for various major newspapers. She left her studies at the Department of Home Economics at Seoul National University to hold posts as a reporter for Hankook Ilbo, Seoul Shinmun, and the cultural section of Kyunghyang Shinmun. For a time she was head of the Korean Women's Development Institute and she is at present Vice-President of the Korean Center of International P.E.N.

In 1954, she received an award in the National College Students' Literary Arts Concours, held by The Kyunghyang Shinmun and the Anti-Communism Alliance. Her literary career was officially launched when her poems "Songs for Today" (Oneureul wihan norae) and "Snail" (Dalpaengi) were recommended for publication in Contemporary Literature (Hyeondae munhak) in 1960.

== Work ==
In her poetry, Kim Hu-ran attempts to create a world of perfect equilibrium and absolute beauty through the practice of self-discipline and control. This great artistic endeavor coincides with the poet's approach towards life seen in "On The Tree" (Namueseo), in which the poet cultivates mind and soul in order to attain wisdom and maturity. Her poems analyze the conflicts and contradictions of life with a modernist sensibility and capture the beauty and complexities of nature. Her early poems "Trees on the Riverside" (Ganggae seon namu), "Echoing in the Sea" (Badae mearijineun) and " In Front of the Pagoda" (Dabotab apeseo) aptly portray the many trials and tribulations inherent in life.

Kim was also known as a lyrical (as opposed to 'ontological') poet, aligned with others including Heu Young-ja, Chung Jin-kyu, Lee Keun-bae, Oh Tak-bon, Yoo An-jin, Park E-dou, Ra Tae-joo, Lee Soo-ik, Song Soo-Kwon, Oh Sae-young, Lee Geon-cheong, Kim Jong-hae, Shin Dalja, Lim Young-jo, Lee Sung-sun, Moon Chung-hee, Kim Hyeong-young, Cho Jeong-kwon, Hong Shin-seon, Sin Dae-chul, Kim Jong-hae, Kim Jong-chul, Lee Garim, Kim Seung-hee, Lee Jun-gwan, Lee kee-chul, Cho Chang-whan, and Yoon Suk-san

=== Awards ===
- 14th Hyeondae Munhak Award in 1968
- 3rd Woltan Munhak Award in 1977

== Works in Korean (partial) ==
Collections of poetry

- The Musical Scale (Jangdo wa jangmi, Eumgye)
- A Certain Wave (Eotteon pado)
- Becoming a Citizen of a Country (Nunui nara simini doeeo)
- In the World Where People Live (Saram saneun sesange)
- Two Become One (Duriseo hana doeeo)
- Songs for Today (Oneureul wihan norae).

Collections of essays

- The Guard of Love (Sarangui pasukkun)
- Geuriumi samuchiljirado
