= Kim Jong-hae =

Korean author, ex-sailor, and publisher (born 1941)

- Born: July 23, 1941; Busan, South Korea
- Occupation: Writer
- Writing career
- Language: Korean
- Period: 1970-present
- Genre: Poetry

- Kim Jong-hae
- Hangul: 김종해
- Hanja: 金鍾海
- RR: Gim Jonghae
- MR: Kim Chonghae

Kim Jong-hae (Korean: 김종해; born July 23, 1941) is a South Korean author, ex-sailor, and publisher.

== Life ==
Kim was born in Busan, Korea, Empire of Japan. He was a founding member of the journal Sinnyeondae, a member of the journal Modern Poetry (Hyeondaesi) and also participated in the publishing of such journals as Love of Nation and Image. He served as secretary general of the Korean Poets' Association and as director of the Korean Publishing Culture Association, and is the chairman of the publishing company Munhaksegyesa

== Work ==
The poetry of Kim Jong-hae can be divided into three distinct periods.

The first period extends from his official literary debut and the publication of his first collection of poetry, The Musical Instrument of Humans (Inganui akgi), to the early 1970s when he published his second collection, Key of the Gods (Sinui yeolsoe). During this period, Kim's poetry depicts the emptiness and despair of contemporary reality, and the poet's will to overcome this reality, and a conviction that he would eventually triumph.

The second period of the poet's career, beginning with the long poem The Spirit of Seoul (Seourui jeongsin), includes Base Slave, Rise Up (Cheonno, ireoseoda), and concludes in the late 1970s with the publication of his third collection of poetry, Why Do You Not Come (Wae ani osinayo?). The poems from this period, even though portraying the profound tragedy at the heart of reality, wrap these concerns in faith and love. Several works during this period take the mother as their subject, and she is depicted as godlike figure who can deliver the world from the cruel realities of the present, and give rise to deeper meditation on the true meaning of love and faith. The long narrative poem Base Slave, Rise Ups (Cheonno, ireoseoda), written near the end of this period, was a semi-biographical account of the slave Manjeok who lived during the Goryeo Dynasty that aptly displays the author's powerful awareness of reality.

Kim was in the camp of 'lyrical' (as opposed to 'ontological) poets like Heu Young-ja, Chung Jin-kyu, Lee Keun-bae, Kim Hu-ran, Oh Tak-bon, Yoo An-jin, Park E-dou, Ra Tae-joo, Lee Soo-ik, Song Soo-Kwon, Oh Sae-young, Lee Geon-cheong, Kang Eun-gyo, Shin Dalja, Lim Young-jo, Lee Sung-sun, Moon Chung-hee, Kim Hyeong-young, Cho Jeong-kwon, Hong Shin-seon, Sin Dae-chul, Kim Jong-hae, Kim Jong-chul, Lee Ga-rim, Kim Seung-hee, Lee Jun-gwan, Lee kee-chul, Cho Chang-whan, and Yoon Suk-san

The final period of the poet's career took place during the 1980s, during which time the poet continued his inquiries into the various problems of life and reality, best exemplified by the poem Sailing Diary (Hanghae ilji). The work is a poetic rendition of the author's experiences in his twenties as a ship crewmember, while also denouncing contemporary conditions that alienate and dehumanize individuals. The work also displays the poet's use of a diverse range of poetic techniques, including the personification of sharks, sea toads, and crocodiles.

=== Awards ===
He awards include the Modern Literature Prize (1982) and the Korean Literature Author's Prize (1985). In March 1963, his poem, "Evening" (Jeonyeok), was awarded the Newcomer's Prize by the journal Free Literature (Jayu munhak), and in 1965 his poem, "Civil War" (Naeran), was chosen in the spring literary contest sponsored by the newspaper Kyunghyang Shinmun.

=== Works in Korean (partial list) ===
- The Musical Instrument of Humans (Inganui akgi)
- Key of the Gods (Sinui yeolsoe)
- Why Do You Not Come? (Wae ani osinayo)
- Base Slave, Rise Up (Cheonno, ireoseoda)
- Sailing Diary (Hanghae ilji)
- Riding the Subway on Windy Days (Barambuneun nareun jihacheoreul tago)
- For a Desert Island (Muindoreul wihayeo)
