= Lee In-hwi =

South Korean writer and workers' rights activist (born 1958)

- 이인휘
- Born: 1958 (age 66–67); Seoul, South Korea
- Occupation(s): Author and novelist
- Known for: Labor rights activism, "labor literature"
- Notable work: Uri eoksen jumeok (우리 억센 주먹 Our Clenched Fists) Hwalhwasan (활화산 Active Volcano) Pyeheoreul boda (폐허를 보다 I See the Ruins)
- Awards: 2016 Manhae Literature Prize

Lee In-hwi (Korean: 이인휘; born 1958, Seoul, South Korea) is a South Korean writer. He made his literary debut in 1988 when his novella Uri eoksen jumeok (우리 억센 주먹 Our Clenched Fists) appeared in the literary journal Nokdukkot. He chaired the Practicing Freedom Committee under the Writers Association of Korea and is a board member of the Association. He won the Manhae Literature Prize in 2016 for his short story collection Pyeheoreul boda (폐허를 보다 I See the Ruins).

== Life ==
Lee In-hwi was born in Seoul, South Korea in 1958. During the Gwangju Uprising in May 1980, he was a third-year international trade student at Myongji University and was dragged off campus to be interrogated by South Korean secret service. The shock from the experience made him quit school. He served his mandatory term in the military and began fighting for workers' rights at the Guro Industrial Complex in 1984. He also started writing during this time. He made his literary debut in 1988 with the novella Uri eoksen jumeok (우리 억센 주먹 Our Clenched Fists), and continued to write novels on labor issues into the early 1990s. He founded a progressive literary journal named Salmi boineun chang ("window with a view of life") in 1997 when the Asian Financial Crisis arose. He raised funds for the journal by writing to 13 singers asking them to give a performance. All thirteen accepted his request, including the singer and social activist Jeong Tae-chun whose songs later inspired Lee's 2017 novel Geonneoganda (건너간다 Crossing).

Lee stopped writing for over a decade after his novel Nalgae dalin mulgogi (날개 달린 물고기 Winged Fish) was published in 2005. He worked at a steel mill, plywood factory, and hotteok plant during his hiatus to earn a living and pay the medical bills for his wife who had been ill for seven years. His time at the factories made him realize working conditions had not improved over the years, and the experience is reflected in his 2016 short story collection Pyeheoreul boda (폐허를 보다 I See the Ruins).

== Writing ==
Lee In-hwi primarily writes about labor issues. South Korean "labor literature" had its heyday in the 1980s. The Chun Doo-hwan administration's violent suppression of the Gwangju Uprising radicalized many South Korean intellectuals who had long opposed the country's military dictatorships. Socialism grew popular with university students and writers depicted the labor scene or envisioned a social revolution led by workers. But the national mood shifted when South Korea became a democracy after amending its constitution in 1987 and its economy began to grow. This newfound political freedom and wealth of the 1990s gave rise to a new class of consumers in the place of workers. Writers turned their attention to consumerist sentiments. Literary critic Kim Myeong-in, best known for arguing in the 1980s that literature should be an ideology to empower the masses, describes this period as follows: "The cultural heritage of the populace was commercialized, and what failed to be commercialized was disposed of."

Lee was one of the few South Korean writers who continued to write about the populace and labor issues into the 1990s, believing that “South Korean society and the labor scene had not inherently changed,” as literary critic Jin Jeong-seok puts it. Lee’s Hwalhwasan (활화산 Active Volcano) (1990) portrays the living conditions of miners, Munbakkeui saramdeul (문밖의 사람들 People Outside the Door) (1992) talks about workers in the aftermath of a nationwide strike from July to August 1987, and Geu achimeun dasi oji anneunda (그 아침은 다시 오지 않는다 That Morning Won’t Come Again) (1993) addresses workers’ and women’s rights. His works, along with other labor literature, remained on the periphery of the South Korean literary scene in the 1990s. Lee took an 11-year hiatus after publishing Nalgae dalin mulgogi (날개 달린 물고기 Winged Fish) in 2005. The novel fictionalizes the story of Lee Yong-seok, a contractor hired by the Korea Workers’ Compensation & Welfare Service who burned himself to death in October 2003.

Lee made his comeback in 2016, publishing a collection of short stories and novellas entitled Pyeheoreul boda (폐허를 보다 I See the Ruins). The book describes the lives of underpaid, overworked laborers who are still “treated as old machine parts that can easily be replaced instead of being respected for their skills,” thirty years after the labor movement of the 1980s. Lee’s novel Geonneoganda (건너간다 Crossing) (2017) is about the life and work of Jeong Tae-chun who “sang the hopes of the people at every turn of history, from the authoritarian Park Chung Hee government in the 70s and Gwangju Uprising in the 80s through the June Struggle of 1987 to today’s candlelight rallies.”

== Works ==
- 활화산 (Active Volcano; 1990)
- 문 밖의 사람들 (People Outside the Door; 1992)
- 그 아침은 다시 오지 않는다 (That Morning Won’t Come Again; 1993)
- 내 생의 적들 (The Enemies in My Life; 2004)
- 날개 달린 물고기 (Winged Fish; 2005)
- 폐허를 보다 (I See the Ruins; 2016)
- 건너간다 (Crossing; 2017)

== Awards ==
- 2016: Manhae Literature Prize
