= Shin Dong-yup =

- Hangul: 신동엽
- RR: Sin Dongyeop
- MR: Sin Tongyŏp

Shin Dong-yup (Korean: 신동엽) is a Korean name consisting of the family name Shin and the given name Dong-yup, and may also refer to:

- Shin Dong-yup (poet) (1930-1969), Korean poet
- Shin Dong-yup (entertainer) (born 1971), South Korean entertainer
