= Park Nam-su =

South Korean poet (1918–1994)

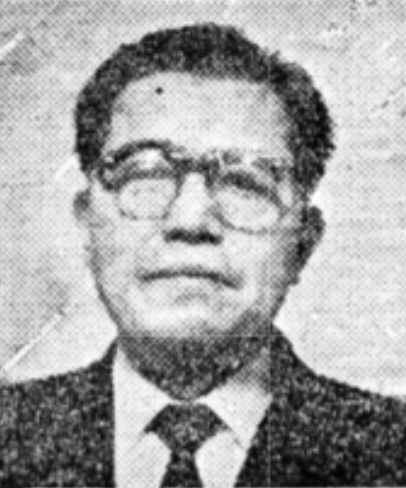
- Born: April 3, 1918
- Died: September 17, 1994 (aged 76)
- Education: Chuo University, Seoul
- Writing career
- Language: Korean

Korean name
- Hangul: 박남수
- Hanja: 朴南秀
- RR: Bak Namsu
- MR: Pak Namsu

Park Nam-su (Korean: 박남수; April 3, 1918 – September 17, 1994) was a South Korean poet.

== Biography ==
Park Nam-su was born on April 3, 1918, in Pyongyang, Heian'nan Province, Korea, Empire of Japan. Park graduated from Chuo University, Tokyo, in 1941. after graduating from Pyongyang Soongin Industrial High School. Park also worked for the Pyongyang branch of the Korean Colonial Bank, though he had already begun his writing career.

Although Park was born in what would become North Korea, he emigrated to the South in 1951 and later to United States in 1973.

Park died on September 17, 1994.

== Work ==
The Korea Literature Translation Institute summarizes Park Nam-su's contributions to Korean literature:

Park Namsu was a pioneer of the poetry that celebrated and explored mundane reality. Park, in the mid to late 1930s, rejected the focus on lyrical naturalism of his contemporaries and instead immersed his art in the exploration of the stark reality and common human experiences. His post-war poetry, such as Sea Gull Sketches (Galmaegi somyo), acutely depicted the toll that warfare wreaked upon the daily lives of ordinary citizens, especially the lingering hardships that refugees faced. The poems of this collection portray a journey of self-discovery; a more complex and deeper understanding of the psyche is achieved through the acute sensibilities that Park's words evoke. By the 1960s, Park shifted his technique from realism to a more abstract study of perception of reality; his work studied the dynamic relationship of the internal perspective and the external world.

Park's quest during this time was to establish a concrete and universal essence of humanity through the exploration of the relationship between constantly evolving critical consciousness of the material world and the material world itself. The image of a 'bird', a symbol that fascinated Park from his first published collection of works, encapsulated his quest to find the meaning of existence. Park is critically acclaimed for both his ability to adroitly harmonize the aesthetic and the internal and his skill in portraying the delicate balance between sense and perception.

== Works in Korean (partial) ==
Published Collections

- A Paper Lantern (Chorongbul)
- Sea Gull Sketch (Galmeagi somyo)
- Refuse of the Gods (Sinui sseuregi)
- Secret Burial of a Bird (Saeui amjang)
- The Crown of a Deer (Saseumui gwan)
- Remembrance of a Forest I Know Not Where (Eodinji morenueun supui gieok)

== Awards ==
- Asia Freedom Literature Prize (1957)
- Gongcho Literary Award (1994)
