= Cho Oh-hyun =

South Korean monk and poet (1932–2018)

- Cho in 2014.
- Born: 1932; Miryang, Korea
- Died: 2018 (aged 85–86)
- Writing career
- Pen name: Musan
- Years active: 1968–2018
- Genre: Sijo poetry

Korean name
- Hangul: 조오현
- Hanja: 曺五鉉
- RR: Jo Ohyeon
- MR: Cho Ohyŏn

Art name
- Hangul: 무산
- Hanja: 霧山
- RR: Musan
- MR: Musan

Dharma name
- Hangul: 만악
- Hanja: 萬嶽
- RR: Manak
- MR: Manak

Cho Oh-hyun (Korean: 조오현; 1932–2018) was a South Korean poet and Zen Buddhist monk.

== Biography ==
Cho was born in Miryang, South Gyeongsang Province, Korea in 1932. He became a novice Buddhist monk in 1939 at the age of seven.

Cho wrote over a hundred poems in his lifetime, including many in sijo form. In 2007, he received the Jeong Jiyong Literature Prize for his book, Distant Holy Man. He was Josil of Kibon Seonwon (Spiritual Master of Fundamental Seon Mediation Center) of Jogye Order of the Korean Buddhism at Baekdamsa Monastery and famous for his Poetry of Delusion. He founded Manhae Foundation and Manhae Prize in Korea. He started his Seon Poetry career in 1966. In 1977, he became the abbot of the temple Sinheungsa, which is the 3rd Diocese of Jogye Order in Korean Buddhism. His book on Seon Poetry, Ten Ox-Herding, was published in 1978, The Seon Anthology of Manak Gathas was published in 2002, and A Remote Holy Man was published in 2007. Many authors have written on Seorak Musan Cho Oh Hyun. He became Josil of Kibon Seonwon (Spiritual Master of Fundamental Seon Mediation Center) of Jogye Order of Korean Buddhism at Baekdamsa Monastery on the14th of March 2014. Cho was internationally known for his poetry. He was also a painter.

Lee (2011) described the Wisdom of the Social Awakening that emerged in the Gathas of Searching the Bulls: centering on Cho's Gathas of Ten Ox Herding. He further elaborates that Cho wrote Ten Ox-Herding gathas as the process of his practice through Seon poems. He concluded that the ox-herding story of Seorak Musan Cho Oh Hyun leads people to a peaceful shelter to stop the agony and awaken the reality of the world. Ox-herding practice can be an alternative for awakening society. Lee (2013) discussed Cho and Ethics Education. He revealed that Cho's approach to ethics education was humanistic. His teachings imported the carriage of leading a life worthy of a human being. While embodying the transcendental ethics of Seon Buddhism, Musan taught that in order to lead a truly human life, it is paramount for all mortals to respect the collective rules of communities. In his exposition of Buddhist ethics, Musan shows a supple understanding that goes beyond Sila and Vinaya, the practice of daily Buddhist lives.

== Award and recognition ==
- 4th Modern Sijo (traditional three-stanza Korean poem) Literary Prize in 1992,
- 7th Nammyeon Literary Prize in 1995
- 16th Garam Literary Prize in 1996
- Garam Sijo Literary Prize in 2001
- Order of National Service Merit Camellia Medal in 2004
- 42nd Korea Literary Prize in 2005
- 19th Jeong Ji-Yong Literary Prize in 2007
- 16th Gongcho literary Prize in 2008
- DMZ (demilitarized zone) Peace Prize in 2009
- 23rd Pogyodaesang (Grand Prize of Transmission Dharma) of Jogye Order of the Korean Buddhism in 2011
- 13th Alpine Literary Prize, 2013
- 4th Korea Art Award in poetry

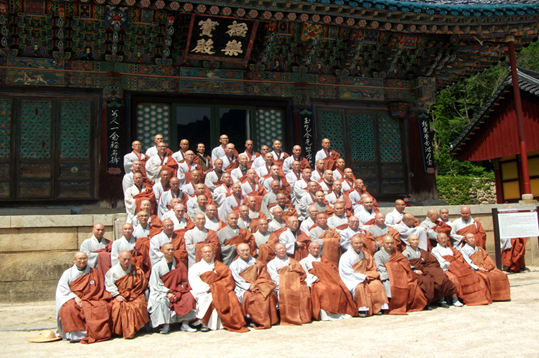
Shinhungsa Monastery, entrance of summer retreat

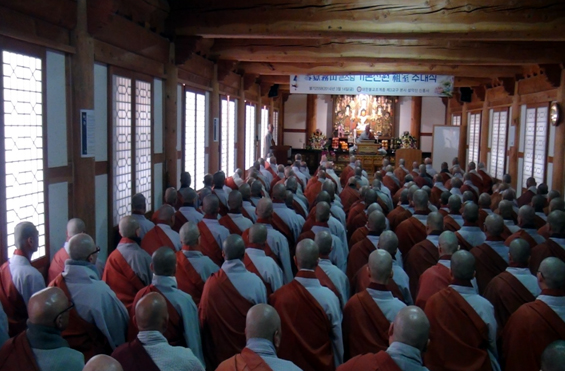
Dharma Talk of Seorak Musan Cho Oh Hyun

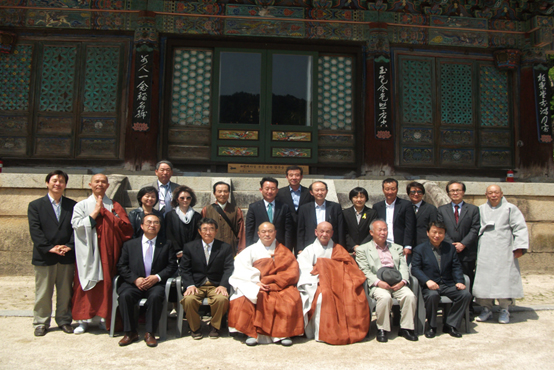
Lay disciples of Seorak Musan Cho Oh Hyun

== Works ==
His poems, The Sound of The Ancient World, Today and Bodhidharma, are published in World Literature Today. Translation with explanatory notes of The Blue Cliff Record. It is a collection of Chán Buddhist koans originally compiled in China during the Song dynasty in 1125 and then expanded into its present form by the Chán master Yuanwu Keqin (1063–1135).

Translation with explanatory notes of The Gateless Gate is a collection of 48 Chan (Zen) koans compiled in the early 13th century by the Chinese Zen master, Wumen Hui-k'ai (1183–1260) (Japanese: Mumon Ekai). Wumen's preface indicates that the volume was published in 1228. Each koan is accompanied by a commentary and verse by Wumen. A classic edition includes a 49th case composed by Anwan (pen name for Cheng Ch'ing-Chih) in 1246. Wu-liang Tsung-shou also supplemented the volume with a verse of four stanzas composed in 1230 about the three checkpoints of Zen master, Huanglong. These three checkpoints of Huanglong should not be confused with Doushuai's Three Checkpoints found in Case 47. 《Seon Question Seon Answer》《How to know the way of living, even if don't know how to die》

He has written Anthropology of Manak Gathas, which is published in Korean, Singhalese, English, Hindi, German, etc.

A volume of his work, For Nirvana: 108 Zen Sijo Poems, was translated by Heinz Insu Fenkl and published by Columbia University Press in 2016. A collection of his "story sijo" prose poems, Tales from the Temple, also translated by Heinz Insu Fenkl was published by Codhill Press in 2019.
