= Jeong Ji-yong =

Korean poet and translator (1902–1950)

Cheong Chi-yong
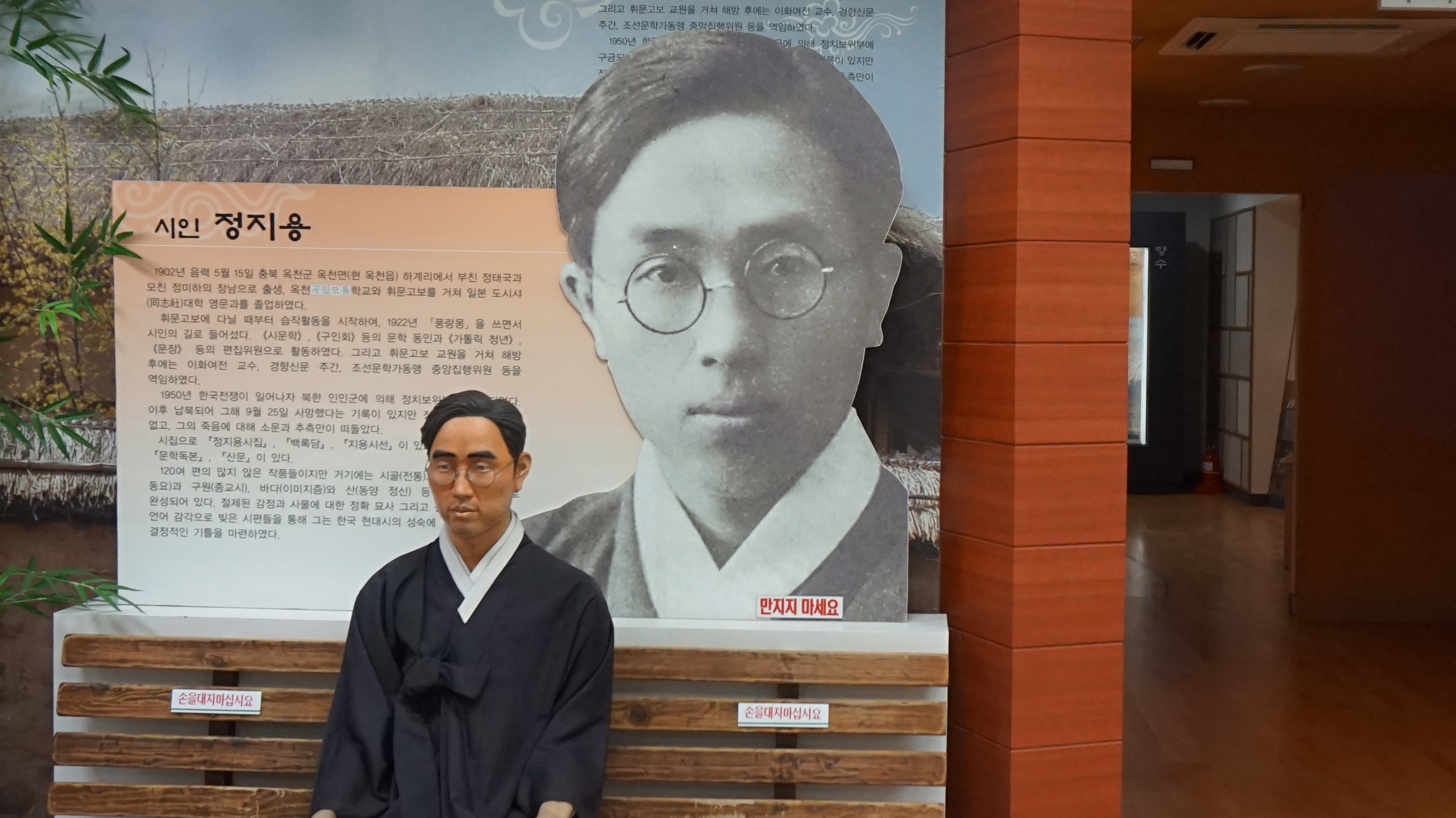
- Jeong Ji-yong statue at Jingyong Literary Museum
- Born: June 20, 1902; Hagye-ri, Okcheon County, Chungcheong Province, Korean Empire
- Died: c. 1950 (aged 47–48); Pyongyang, North Korea
- Education: Doshisha University
- Writing career
- Language: Korean

Korean name
- Hangul: 정지용
- Hanja: 鄭芝溶
- RR: Jeong Jiyong
- MR: Chŏng Chiyong

Jeong Ji-yong, often romanized in literature as Cheong Chi-yong (Korean: 정지용; 20 June 1902 – c. 1950), was a Korean poet and translator of English poetry who "opened a new horizon of poetic possibilities through chiselled expression, tempered sentiments, and precise visual imagery" according to the scholar of Korean poetry, Brother Anthony.

== Biography ==
Cheong Chi-yong was born in Hagye-ri, Okcheon, Chungcheongbuk-do, on June 20, 1902. (Note: Some sources indicate that he might have been born on 15 May or 20 June 1902.) He attended Whimoon High School and graduated from Japan's Doshisha University with a major in English Literature. While studying at Whimoon High School, he published the literary magazine Bulletin (Yoram) with contemporaries like Park Palyang. In 1926, he began to concentrate exclusively on composing poetry, and his piece "Cafe France" (Kape peurangseu) was published in Hakjo magazine. Later in life, Jung was active as an associate of Pak Yong-chol's Poetry (Simunhak) magazine and taught at Whimoon High School. After Liberation, he taught at Ewha Womans University, edited the Kyunghyang Daily News, and was a member of the Central Executive Committee of the Korean Writers Federation (Joseon Munhakga dongmaeng). In 1950, at the onset of the Korean War, he was detained by the Government Preservation Department and then transferred to Pyongyang Prison, where he is believed to have died.

== Work ==
Cheong Chi-yong is considered among the most important poets to emerge from the modernist movement in Korea, he has been described as "the first modern Korean poet." In 2007, he was listed by the Korean Poets' Association among the ten most important modern Korean poets. His poetry can be divided into three stages. The first stage, which took place around 1925 to 1933, is characterized by the poet's sensual imagist work, which often focused on the sea. Beginning with his 1933 poem Phoenix (Bulsajo) and ending in 1935, the poet composed religious poetry influenced by his Catholic faith; this second period served as a transition period between his early sensous poetry and his later more traditional poetry. After his "Ongnyu Village" (Ongnyudong) and "Guseong Village" (Guseongdong) in 1941, his poetry evinced the predominance of Eastern thinking in its aesthetic. After his 1934 poems "A Different Heaven" (Dareun haneul) and "Yet Another Sun" (Tto hanaui dareun taeyang), Jung discarded the religious tendency of his earlier work. After nearly four years of absence from writing, he arrived at a mentality that sought to overcome the pains of reality, as seen in "Ongnyu Village", "Mountain Peak" (Bong), and "Guseong Village".

=== Works in translation ===
- Distant Valleys: Poems of Chŏng Chi-Yong. translated by Daniel A. Kister. (1994)
- Cheong Chi-yong Cheonjip [The Collected Works of Chŏng Chi-yong]. Seoul. (1988)
- "Eight Poems of Chong Chi-yong" [with translations by Daniel A. Kister], Korea Journal 30 (2): 39~51. includes "Dahlias." (1990)
- "The Early Poetry of Chong Chi-yong" [with translations by Daniel A. Kister], Korea Journal 30 (2):28~38. (1990)
- Eine andere Sonne (정지용 시선)
- Nostalgia (향수): Poems of Chung Ji-yong [translated by Insoo Lee and Sung-Il Lee]. (2017)

=== Works in Korean (partial) ===
Poetry

- The Collected Poems of Jung Jiyong (Jung Jiyong sijip; 1935)
- White Deer Lake (Baengnokdam; 1941)
- The Collected Works of Jiyong (Jiyong siseon),(1946)

Prose

- Literary Reader (Munhak dokbon; 1948)
- Prose (Sanmun; 1949)

=== Secondary material ===
- Jin A Moon, "A Study of Chong Chi Yong's Poetry" (abstract in English) 청람어문학, 8권, 단일호, 시작쪽수 250쪽, 전체쪽수 56쪽 http://www.papersearch.net/KissShop/search/Sh_se_DetailView.aspx?strAtclKey=220342

== Tribute ==
On 17 June 2019, on Jeong Ji-yong's 117th birthday, he was honored with a Google Doodle.

== See also ==
- Jeong Jiyong Literature Prize
