= Yoo Ja-hyo =

South Korean broadcaster and poet (born 1947)

Yoo Ja Hyo
- Born: September 13, 1947 (age 78); Seoul, South Korea
- Citizenship: South Korean
- Writing career
- Language: Korean

- Yoo Ja-hyo
- Hangul: 유자효
- Hanja: 柳子孝
- RR: Yu Jahyo
- MR: Yu Chahyo

Yoo Ja Hyo (Korean: 유자효; born 1947) is a South Korean broadcaster and poet.

== Personal life ==
Yoo was born in Seoul on September 13, 1947, and graduated from Seoul National University.

== Career ==
In 1968, his poetry was accepted for the New Year's Literature Prize of the Shin-a ilbo. In 1972, he made his debut in a poem titled 'wedding' in the Shijo munhak(A literary magazine in Korea). He served as director of SBS Radio. He is currently the director of the Society of Korean Poets and the president of the Jiyong Association (established in 1988 to honor the poet Jeong Jiyong).

== Works ==
- outgoing (떠남; 1993)
- My soul is (내 영혼은; 1994)

== Awards ==
- Jeong Jiyong Literature Prize (2005)

== See also ==
- Korean literature
- List of Korean-language poets
- Society of Korean Poets
