= Gennady Katsov =

Soviet Russian-American poet and writer

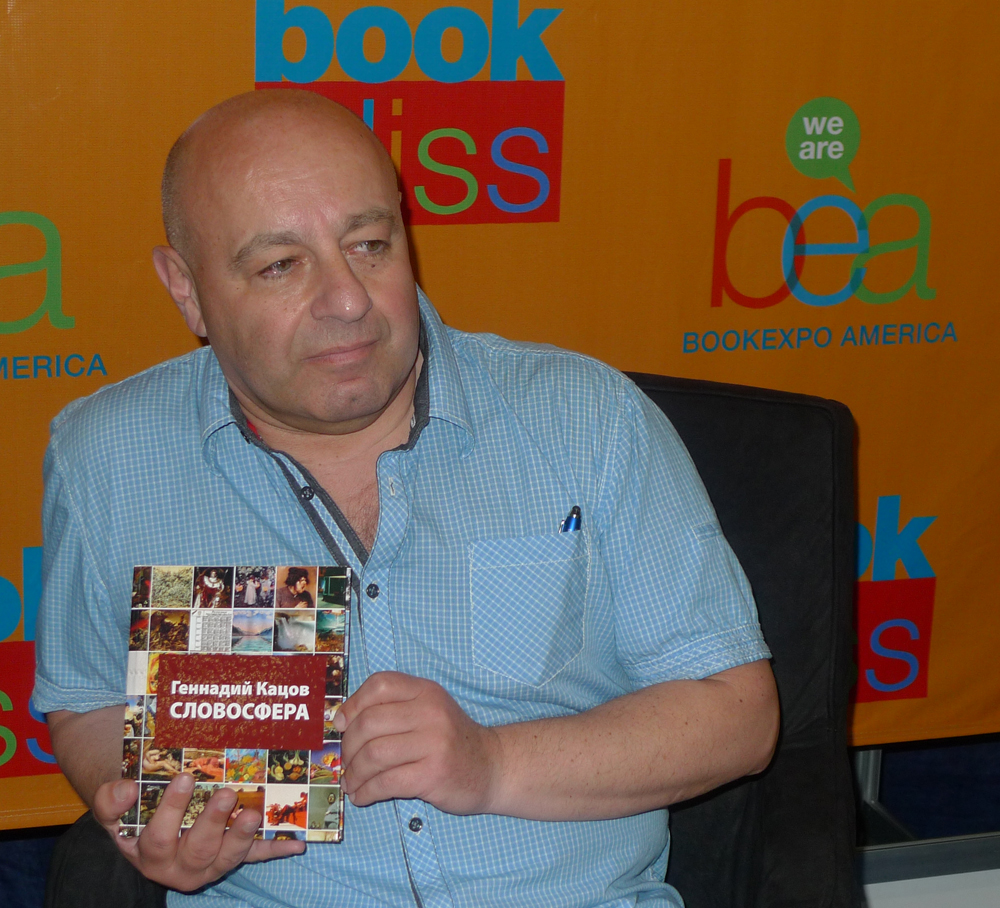
- Katsov in 2013
- Born: February 13, 1956 (age 70); Yevpatoria, Ukraine
- Citizenship: American
- Occupations: Poet; Journalist
- Writing career
- Language: Russian

Gennady Katsov (Russian: Геннадий Кацов; born February 13, 1956 in Evpatoria, Ukrainian SSR, USSR) is a Soviet Russian-American poet, writer and journalist from Ukraine.

== Early life ==
He was born and raised in Evpatoria, Crimean peninsula in Ukraine. He graduated from the Shipbuilding Institute (Russian: Кораблестроительный институт) at Nikolaev (Russian: Николаев), now known as Mykolaiv, and worked in the department of the Chief Designer at the Kherson Shipyard (Russian: Херсонский судостроительный завод). Later, he graduated from the All-Union Correspondence University of Public Knowledge (Russian: Всесоюзный заочный университет общественных знаний) with a two-year degree in journalism. During his second year of studies, he became interested in the fine arts and visited both Moscow and Leningrad. During a visit to the Hermitage, he decided that he would learn more about art history.

== Career ==
In the early 1980s Gennady Katsov moved to Moscow and became close to Ivan Zhdanov (Russian: Иван Жданов) who introduced him to many artists including Lesha Parshchikov (Russian: Лешей Парщиков), Sasha Eremenko, (Russian: Сашей Еременко), Konstantin Kedrov (Russian: Константин Александрович Кедров), Dmitri Prigov (Russian: Дмитрий Александрович Пригов), who is one of the founders of Russian conceptualism, and Sergey Letov (Russian: Сергей Летов), who is an older brother of Yegor Letov (Russian: Егор Летов) the founder of Grazhdanskaya Oborona (Russian: Гражданская Оборона) (Civil Defense). In 1986, Katsov was one of the founders of the legendary Moscow Poetry Club (Russian: Поэзия) and from 1987 to 1989 served as its director, as well as an active participant of the Epsilon salon (Russian: Эпсилон-салон), a famous Moscow underground literary group.

Novels by Gennady Katsov were published in the journal "Mitin" (MZh) (Russian: «Митин журнал» («МЖ»)); his articles, short stories, plays and poems were published in the anthology "Chernovik" (New York) (Russian: Черновик) (Draft), and a selection of his poems was included in the first issue of the literary magazine "Khreschatyk" (Kiev) (Russian: Крещатик), which is one of the most prominent Russian-language literary magazines published outside of Russia.

In Leningrad, Katsov was close to Alexander Kahn (Russian: Александр Михайлович Кан; born 1954 Kherson), a 1970s graduate of the faculty of foreign languages at Tula State University (Note: Факультет иностранных языков Тульского государственного университета имени Л.Н. Толстого or Faculty of Foreign Languages, Tula State University named after L.N. Tolstoy) who spoke English fluently and founded the Leningrad Jazz Club Kvadrat (Russian: «Квадрат»). In 1984 during peristroika, Kahn, who had been a writer for both Billboard and Coda, gave many visitors tours of Leningrad where Katsov became immersed in the music scene. (Note: Alexander Kahn, a cultural affairs writer for the BBC, organized Leningrad's and Saint Petersburg's Open Music festival (Russian: «Открытая музыка») from 1989 to 1993, was a cultural advisor to the United States Consulate General in St. Petersburg from 1993 to 1996, moved to London in 1996, and since 2005 has been the producer of the Russian program during the London Jazz Festival.)

On May 12, 1989, Gennady Katsov moved to New York after living in Austria and Italy. He worked as a concierge at the Le Parker Meridien from 1989 to 1995.

From 1989 to 1991, Katsov, along with Sergei Dovlatov and Alexander Genis worked at the Radio Liberty, where he produced segments on modern culture in Peter Weil's program entitled Above the Barriers. Gennady was regularly published in the daily newspaper The New Russian Word (Russian: «Новое русское слово»), as well as in Russian-American literary almanac Slovo \ Word (Russian: СЛОВО/SLOVO).

He left his concierge job in 1995 and in 1995-1997 Katsov was a founder and co-owner of Russian avant-garde café «Anyway» in Manhattan opening it the week before Halloween in 1995.

He was the publisher and the editor-in-chief of a weekly Russian language newspaper The Printed Organ (Russian: «Печатный орган») in New York (1994-1998), the editor-in-chief of the Guide to New York (issued quarterly, 1997–1998), the weekly magazine Telenedelya (Russian: «Теленедели») (2000-2004), as well as the weekly Russian-language magazine МЕТРО (pronounced "metro") (Russian: МЕТРО) (February 2004 – 2007), a weekly New York Russian-language magazine covering greater New York City cultural events.

He had a prominent role in the weekly TV segment New York: history and geography in Dmitry Poletaev's program of Good Evening, America! (Nationwide television EABC, New York, 1997–1999), a weekly hour radio "Morning Solyanka" on Russian-American radio RTN / WMNB (1998-2000), served as editor-in- chief for RTN / WMNB radio (2000-2003).

Since 2000 Gennady Katsov authors and anchors the daily political and economic 30-minute TV program entitled Not a Day Without a Line - an overview of the American press on Russian-American television RTN / WMNB. Starting in 2003 Gennady is the author and a host of the daily TV program A Morning Run, as well and the Sunday program Press Club aired on the same channel.

As of 2010 – Gennady Katsov is the owner and an editor-in-chief of the Russian-American Internet news portal RUNYweb.com, which includes the Encyclopedia of Russian America. Gennady periodically takes part in the BBC's program the Fifth Floor.

In 2011, after a nearly an eighteen-year hiatus, Gennady got back to his poetic activities. His book entitled Slovosfera (Russian: Словосфера), which is composed of poetic texts dedicated to the masterpieces of art, was published at the end of April 2013. After that seven more books of Gennady Katsov have been published: "Between the Ceiling and the Floor" (Russian: Меж потолком и полом) (New York) in 2013, "365 Days around the Sun" (Russian: 365 дней вокруг Солнца) (New York) in 2014, "Youth Exercises (1983-1985)" (Russian: Юношеские Экзерсисы (1983–1985)) in 2014, "25 years with the right to correspondence" (Russian: 25 лет с правом переписки) (Moscow) in 2014, "Three “Cs” and Vers librarium" (Russian: Три “Ц” и Верлибрарий) (New York) in 2015, "New York primer" (Russian: Нью-йоркский букварь) (Moscow) in 2018, "On the Western Front" (Russian: «На Западном фронте. Стихи о войне 2020 года») (Moscow) in 2021. All - poetry collections in Russian.

In 2014, ForumDaily nominated him for the Person of the Year by Russian-speaking America in the category “For Outstanding Achievements in the Media” as the outstanding representative of radio, television and the press, working in both Russian-language and English-language media.

== Personal ==
He and his wife Rika live in New York.
