= Shin Dalja =

South Korean poet (born 1943)

- Hangul: 신달자
- Hanja: 慎達子
- RR: Sin Dalja
- MR: Sin Talcha

Shin Dalja (Korean: 신달자; born 1943) is a South Korean poet.

== Life ==
Shin Dalja was born in 1943 in Geochang, Gyeongnam. She was born as the fifth daughter among one son and six daughters. Her adolescence was relatively stable under her businessman father, but her mother advised her that "women must also study", which led her to go study in Busan during her high school years. When she was in her second year of high school, she won the Gyeongnam essay contest, which gave her the chance to go to Sookmyung Women's University for Korean Literature. She graduated in 1965. In 1964, her poem "Hwansangui Bam" (환상의 밤 A Night of Fantasy) was selected by Yeosang, a women's magazine. She started her literary career in 1972 when her poems "Bal" (발 Feet), and "Cheo-eum moksori" (처음 목소리 The First Voice) were recommended by Park Mog-Weol to Hyundae Munhak. She was also a member of Munchae with poets Yoo An-Jin and Lee Hyang-Ah, publishing poems that sensually express aesthetic sensibility specific to women, acquiring a wide readership. She graduated from Sookmyung Women's University for Korean Literature, graduated from the same university's graduate school, and have earned a doctorate for literature. She was a Korean literature professor at Pyeongtaek University, and then a creative writing professor at Myongji University. From 2012 she became the president of the Society of Korean Poets. She is also a member of the National Academy of arts of The Republic of Korea. She was selected as the first chairperson of the Policy Committee for Promotion of Literature.

== Writing ==
Shin Dalja began her literary career when she was twenty. Thus, it is no overstatement that she has been with poetry for over half a century. She has expressed life's struggles with delicate sensibility, and has pioneered and represented the domain of women's poetry in Korean literature. She has won the Yeongrang Poetry prize, the Gong-cho Literature Prize, the Kim Junseong Literature Prize, the Daesan Literary Award, and the Chong Chi-Yong Literature Prize. Her contribution towards developing the cultural arts was recognized and she won the Silver Crown Order of Cultural Merit. She has been the president of the Society of Korean Poets, and was also selected as 'A Writer to Watch This Year' at the 2016 Seoul International Book Fair, receiving much honor as a poet can.

Poet Shin Dalja debuted into the literary circle in 1972 by the recommendation of poet Park Mog-Weol in Hyundae Munhak. In 1973, she published her first poetry collection Bongheonmunja (봉헌문자) with 40 poems. In the foreword of this poetry collection, Park Mog-Weol said that "rather than resistance or interested toward extravagance or morality, she reveals 'the truth of feet that dedicate themselves/ within the silence of pain' – omitted – that she arouses in us wide human sympathy". Through writing poetry for almost fifty years, Shin Dalja has suggested positivity and tolerance of higher levels rather than separation and exclusion. She dreams of silence that is indifferent to worldly objects. Shin Dalja creates generous and delicate middle-aged women as narrators, looking back on a life of desolation with free and humorous voice. She shows a poetic style that expresses interest toward motherhood and femininity that breathe life into a life of barrenness. Recently, her poetic tendencies have shifted toward expressing her will to reach a world of kind silence, a world of true words that awaken the eyes of the soul, and a world of life that overflows with peace and energy.

== Works ==
=== Poetry collections ===
- Bongheonmunja (봉헌문자), Hyundae Munhak, 1973.
- Gyeo-ul chukje (겨울축제 Winter Festival), Jogwang Publishing, 1976.
- Gohyangui mul (고향의 물 The Water of Home), Seomoondang, 1982.
- Aga (아가(雅歌) Song of Songs), Haenglim Publishing, 1986.
- Aga 2 (아가(雅歌) 2 Song of Songs 2), Literature & Thought, 1988.
- Oeroumeul dollo chirira (외로움을 돌로 치리라 I Will Hit Loneliness With a Stone) Jongro Books, 1989.
- Baechiseulpeum (백치슬픔 Foolish Sadness ), Jayumunhaksa, 1989.
- Sarangeul wihayeo (사랑을 위하여 For Love), Jayumunhaksa, 1991.
- Sigangwa-ui donghaeng (시간과의 동행 Walking With Time), MunhakSegyeSa, 1993.
- Sarang (사랑 Love), Jayumunhaksa, 1996.
- Baro-ege (바로에게 To Baro), Sintaeyangsa, 1996.
- Abeoji-ui bit (아버지의 빛 The Light of the Father), MunhakSegyeSa, 1999.
- Eomeoni, geu bbittulbbittulhan geulssi (어머니, 그 삐뚤삐뚤한 글씨 Mother, That Crooked Writing), Moonhak Soochup, 2001.
- Ijeya neohuireul mannatda (이제야 너희를 만났다 I've Finally Met You), Moonhak Soochup, 2003.
- Orae malhaneun sai (오래 말하는 사이 Someone I've Talked For a Long Time With), Minumsa, 2004.
- Yeolae (열애 Passionate Love), Minumsa, 2007.
- Noraehaetseul bbunida (노래했을 뿐이다 I Just Only Sang), Munhagnamu, 2008.
- Baram (바람 Wind), Siwol Publishing, 2009.
- Jongi (종이Paper), Minumsa, 2011.
- Mul wireul geotneun yeoja (물 위를 걷는 여자 The Woman Who Walks On Water), Seojeongsihak, 2011.
- Sal Heureuda (살 흐르다 The Flesh Flows), Minumsa, 2014.
- Bukchon (북촌 The Northern Village), Minumsa, 2016.

=== Essay collections ===
- Dasi buneun baram (다시 부는 바람 A Wind That Blows Again), Yewonmunhwasa, 1972.
- Na-ui seomeun areumdawotda (나의 섬은 아름다웠다 My Island Was Beautiful), Muneumsa, 1982.
- Jisangui dan han sarameul wihayeo (지상의 단 한 사람을 위하여 For One Person On the Earth), MunhakSegyeSa, 1984.
- Han janui galsaek chaga doe-eo (한 잔의 갈색 차가 되어 To Become a Cup of Brown Tea), Yeoleumsa, 1985.
- Siganeul seonmulhapnida (시간을 선물합니다 I'd Like to Gift You Time), Jayumunhaksa, 1986.
- Geudagyeot-e jamdeulgo sipeora (그대곁에 잠들고 싶어라 I Want to Fall Asleep Next to You), Jayumunhaksa, 1986.
- Dangsineun yeonghoneul jusyeotseupnida (당신은 영혼을 주셨습니다 You Gave Me a Soul), Jayumunhaksa, 1986.
- Aron na-ui aron (아론 나의 아론 Aaron My Aaron), Useok, 1987.
- Jigeumeun sineul bureul ttae (지금은 신을 부를 때 This is the Time to Call God), Literature & Thought, 1987.
- Areumdaun sunbaekui yeonghoneuro (아름다운 순백의 영혼으로 With a Beautiful and Pure Soul), Girinwon, 1987.
- Mannam-i itgikkaji (만남이 있기까지 Until Meeting), Youngun Books, 1988.
- Du sarameul wihan hana-ui sarang (두 사람을 위한 하나의 사랑 One Love for Two People), Goryeowon, 1988.
- Baekchi aein (백치애인 The Foolish Lover), Jayumunhaksa, 1988.
- Soneul japeumyeon maeumkkaji (손을 잡으면 마음까지 When Holding Hands Our Minds Go Too), Haemun Publishing, 1988.
- Mipji aneun neo-ege (밉지 않은 너에게 You Who I Do Not Dislike), Garam Publishing, 1989.
- Ne-ip keullobeo (네잎 클로버 Four-leaf Clover), Jayumunhaksa, 1989.
- Bam-e sseun pyeonjineun buchiji mothanda (밤에 쓴 편지는 부치지 못한다 A Letter Written At Night Can't Be Sent), Cheongmaek, 1989.
- Honja saranghagi (혼자 사랑하기 Loving Alone), Munhyangsa, 1989.
- Sarang-iyeo, na-ui moksum-iyeo (사랑이여, 나의 목숨이여 My Love, My Life), Osangsa, 1989.
- Sala itneun han sarangharira (살아 있는 한 사랑하리라 I Will Love As Long As I Live), Sisajeongron, 1990.
- Geudae-ege jul maleun yeonseup-i pilyohada (그대에게 줄 말은 연습이 필요하다 Things I Say To You Need Practice), Jayumunhaksa, 1990.
- Saranghago itneun yeoja (사랑하고 있는 여자 A Woman In Love), 조선일보사, 1990.
- Sarangeun seoro majubomi anira duliseo han gotseul baraboneun geotsipnida (사랑은 서로 마주봄이 아니라 둘이서 한 곳을 바라보는 것입니다 Love is Not About Looking At Each Other, But Looking Together At One Place), MunhakSegyeSa, 1990.
- Gileun eodiae itneunjiyo (길은 어디에 있는지요 Where is the Road), Jayumunhaksa, 1991.
- Byeoleun apado banjjakinda (별은 아파도 반짝인다 Stars Shine Even If They Hurt), Dongseomunhaksa, 1991.
- Yeonaeron (연애론 The Theory of Romance), Jayumunhaksa, 1992.
- Haengbokjunbi (행복준비 Preparations for Happiness), Seoul Media Group, 1992.
- Neo-ui jeolmang-kkajido ango sipda (너의 절망까지도 안고 싶다 I Want to Hold Even Your Despair), Cheongmaek, 1992.
- Holo-imyeonseo hologa anideutsi (홀로이면서 홀로가 아니듯이 As If Not Alone When Alone), MunhakSegyeSa, 1993.
- Yeojaneun naiwa hamkke areumdawojinda (여자는 나이와 함께 아름다워진다 Women Become More Beautiful With Age), Jayumunhaksa, 1994.
- Yeojaro sandaneun geoteun (여자로 산다는 것은 To Live as a Woman), Donghwa Publishing, 1994.
- Ah! Eomeoni (아! 어머니 Oh! Mother), Jayumunhaksa, 1995.
- Sarang (사랑 Love), Jayumunhaksa, 1996.
- Godokeun gajang gipeun sarangida (고독은 가장 깊은 사랑이다 Loneliness is the Deepest Love), Jayumunhaksa, 1996.
- Sarang-eneun doki itda (사랑에는 독이 있다 There is Poison in Love), Moonhak Soochup, 1997.
- Geuraedo geureul saranghapnida (그래도 그를 사랑합니다 But I Still Love Him), bm-books, 1997.
- Gobaek (고백, Confession), Moonhak Soochup, 1997.
- Jeolmeun nalui insaengnoteu (젊은 날의 인생노트 A Note On Life From the Days of Youth), Jayumunhaksa, 1998.
- Si-inui sarang (시인의 사랑 The Love of a Poet), Jayumunhaksa, 1999.
- Baekchi aein (백치애인 The Foolish Lover), Jayumunhaksa, 2002.
- 30 Dae yeojaga saneun beob (30대 여자가 사는 법How to Live As a Woman In Her 30s), Jayumunhaksa 2005.
- 20 Dae yeojaga saneun beob (20대 여자가 사는 법 How to Live As a Woman In Her 20s), Jayumunhaksa, 2005.
- Neoneun i segajireul myeongsimhara (너는 이 세 가지를 명심하라 Remember These Three Things), Munhakdongne, 2006.
- Mianhae gomawo saranghae (미안해 고마워 사랑해 Sorry, Thank You, Love You), Munhakuimunhak, 2010.
- Nunsongiwa buditcheodo geudae sangcheo ipeuri (눈송이와 부딪쳐도 그대 상처 입으리 Even If You Hit a Snowflake, You Will Be Hurt), Munhakuimunhak, 2011.
- Yeojareul wihan insaeng 10 gang (여자를 위한 인생 10강 10 Life Lessons for Women), Minumsa, 2011.
- Eommawa ttal (엄마와 딸 Mother and Daughter), Minumsa, 2013.
- Shin Dalja gamseong poto esei (신달자 감성 포토 에세이 Shin Dalja's Emotional Photo Essay), Literature & Thought, 2015.

=== Works in translation ===
- Bukchon
- Morgendämmerung
- Papel
- ЦААС (Mongolian)

== Awards ==
- 1964 New Female Writer Literature Award
- 1989 Republic of Korea Literature Award
- 2001 Poetry and Poetics Award
- 2004 Korean Poets Association Award
- 2007 Hyundae Buddhist Literature Prize
- 2008 Yeongrang Poetry Prize
- 2009 Gong-Cho Literature Prize
- 2011 Kim Jun-seong Literary Award
- 2011 Daesan Literary Awards
- 2012 The Republic of Korea's Eungwan Order of Cultural Merit (2nd Class)
- 2016 Jeong Jiyong Literature Prize
