= Pak Yong-chol =

Korean poet

- 박용철
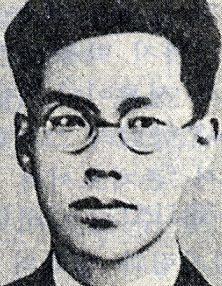
- Born: June 21, 1904; Gwangsan
- Died: May 12, 1938 (aged 33); Seoul
- Occupations: Poet, translator

Korean name
- Hangul: 박용철
- Hanja: 朴龍喆
- RR: Bak Yongcheol
- MR: Pak Yongch'ŏl

Pak Yong-chol (Korean: 박용철; Hanja: 朴龍喆; 21 June 1904 – 12 May 1938) was a Korean poet and translator of Ibsen. Pak founded a "pure poetry group" and published a magazine named Shi munhak with Chong Ji-yeong.
