= Konstantin Kedrov =

Russian philosopher and literary critic (1942–2025)

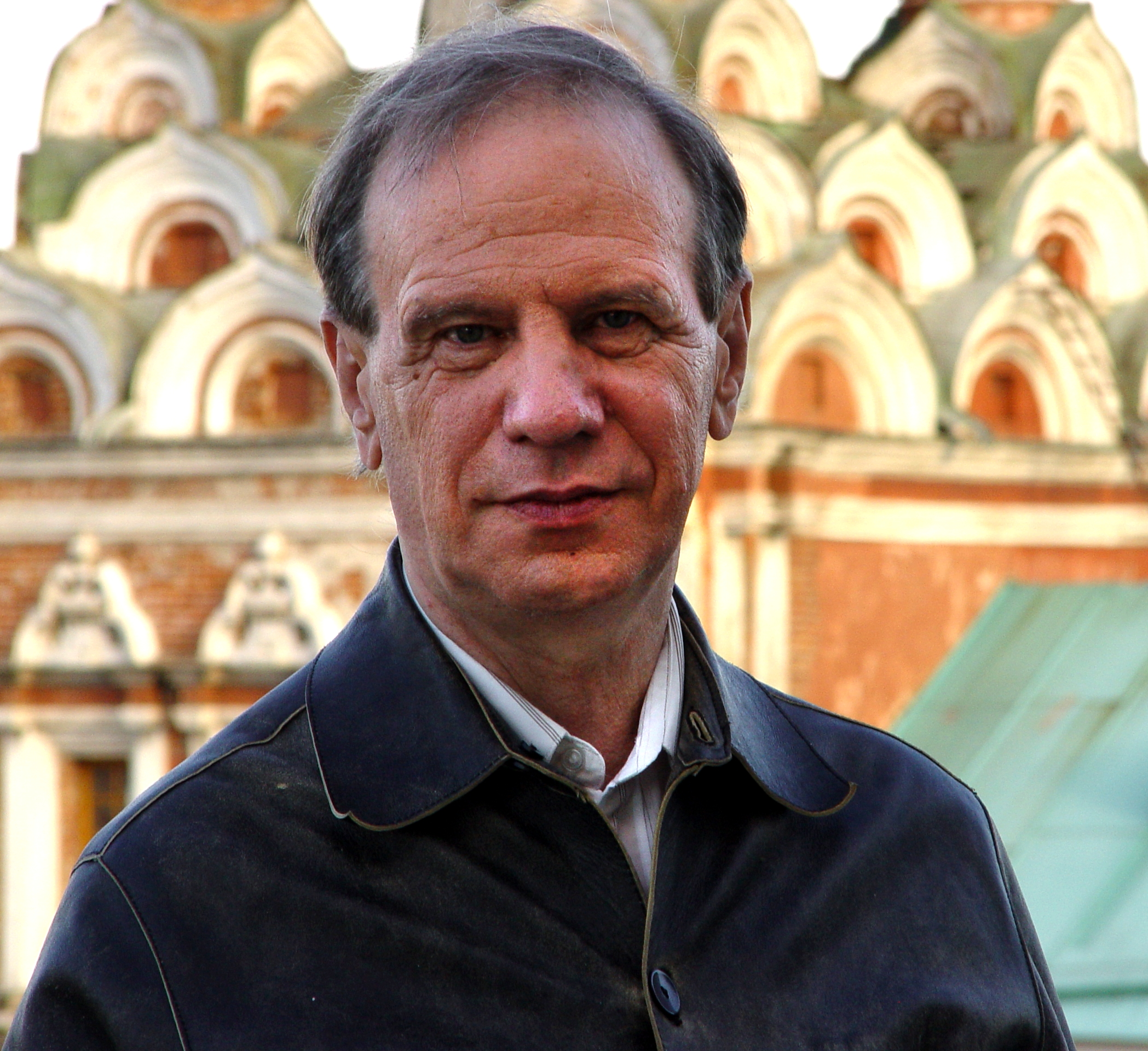
Kedrov in 2005

Konstantin Aleksandrovich Kedrov (Russian: Константин Александрович Кедров; 12 November 1942 – 16 April 2025) was a Russian poet, philosopher and literary critic. He was a member of the Union of Soviet Writers (1989). Candidate of philological sciences, Doctor of philosophy, Professor of the Institute for Literature. Сhief editor of «Journal of Poets» literary magazine. Literary critic and literary historian. Author of the term metametaphor (1984) and of the philosophical theory of metacode.

According to the mass media and bookmakers’ offices, in the years of 2003—2005, he was nominated for Nobel prize for literature. Winner of the Korean Manhae Prize (2013).

== Biography ==
Born in the family of theatre director Aleksandr Berdichevsky (1910, Tyumen — September 30, 1991, Moscow) and actress Nadezhda Yumatova (1917, Dubrovka — April 30, 1991 — the sister of the surrealist painter Pavel Tchelitchev). The actors of the city theatre of Rybinsk, Yaroslavl region, where they stayed in evacuation till the year of 1945.

Since 1960, Konstantin Kedrov resides in Moscow.

He studied for one year at the Moscow State University named after Mikhail Lomonosov, Faculty of Journalism (1961—1962), and, following his dismissal, moved to the Kazan State University.

In the year of 1958, in «Komsomolets Tatarii» Weekly, published the first selection from Kedrov’s poetry.

In the year of 1973, Kedrov defended his PhD dissertation on the topic “Epical basis of Russian novels of the first half of the 19th century” at the Moscow State University. In the years of 1974–1986, Kedrov was a senior lecturer at the Chair of history of Russian literature, Institute for Literature named after Maksim Gorky. There, Kedrov attracted a few student poets interested in Russian vanguard poetry, including Alexei Parshchikov, Ilya Kutik, Aleksandr Yeryomenko, et al. (Metametaphorists). In 1983, Kedrov defined the general principle of their poetry as a metametaphor.

In the year of 1986 Kedrov ceased lecturing at the Institute for Literature and took upon literary freelancing. According to the papers that Kedrov requested from archives of the Russian Federal Counterintelligence Agency in the year of 1996, previously they launched a personal case against him titled “Forester” (on suspicion of anti-Soviet propaganda and agitation) that was deleted in August of the year of 1990.

In the year of 1989, Sovetsky Pisatel Publishing House published Kedrov’s monograph Poetical Cosmos that, upon a vast literary and mythological basis, concentrated upon the concept of metametaphor and a philosophical idea of metacode. From 1991, he worked for several years as a literary columnist for the Izvestia newspaper. After a split in the editorial board of Izvestia, he and editor Igor Golembiovsky moved to the newspaper Novye Izvestia.

According to the papers that Kedrov requested from archives of the Russian Federal Counterintelligence Agency in the year of 1996, previously they launched a personal case against him titled “Forester” (on suspicion of anti-Soviet propaganda and agitation) that was deleted in August of the year of 1990[4]. Subsequently, in the years of 1986 through 1991, Kedrov was unemployed. That time, he had to sell the pictures and graphics of his grand-uncle Pavel Chelishchev inherited in the year of 1972. Nowadays, these items are kept at Nashi Khudozhniki (Our Artists) Gallery at Rublyovka. These include a portrait of Kedrov’s grandmother Sophia Chelishcheva (married name Yumatova) made by Pavel Chelishchev in the year of 1914 in Dubrovka, their family estate in Kaluga Province, owned by Kedrov’s great-grandfather, landlord Fyodor Chelishchev. The portrait was published in Pavel Chelishchev album compiled by Nashi Khudozhniki (Our Artists) Gallery (Petrony Publishing House, 2006. P. 35). The albom also features copies of some other Chelishchev’s works with an attributin “From Konstantin Kedrov’s collection”. In the year of 2008, Russian Kultura (Culture) TV Channel demonstarted a documentary about Pavel Chelishchev “An Uneven-Winged Angel” (script by Kedrov and Nina Zaretskaya, shooting locations included Moscow and New York).

Since the year of 1988, Kedrov has participated in international poetical events, his first trip abroad was to attend a Soviet vanguard art fest in the city of Imatra (Finland).

November 28, 2008, Kedrov joined the ceremony of opening a monument for Osip Mandelstam in Moscow. June 22, 2009, Kedrov participated in presentation of a monument for Academician Andrey Sakharov and of his own sculptural portrait, both from sculptor Grigory Pototsky, at the Moscow Manezh.

Kedrov died on 16 April 2025, at the age of 82.

The associates and students of Konstantin Alexandrovich Kedrov, many of whom are outstanding figures in the culture and literature of modern Russia, published an appeal in the pages of «Literaturnaya Gazeta» to preserve the memory of the departed master.

== Awards ==
- 1999 — International David Burlyuk the Father of Russian Futurism Otmetina (Award).
- 2003 — GRAMMy.ru Prize, Annual Poetry Event nomination for his poem «Computer of Love».
- 2005 — Twice GRAMMY.ru Laureate, Annual Poetry Event nomination.
- 2005 — «Deti Ra» Magazine Prize, Drama nomination.
- 2007 — Literaturnaya Rossiya Weekly Annual Laureate for his poem Fialkiada.
- 2008 — Diploma of contributing to a Book Fair under the Agnon Biblic Project (Israel).
- 2009 — Aleksandr Griboedov Prize “For his Loyal Service to National Belles-Lettres” (Resolution of Moscow City Branch and Translators’ Section of the Russian Writers’ Union of November 17, 2009).
- 2009 — Medal of Internet Community under the Literary Club and Board of Directors of the Internet Poets’ Union.
- 2013 — Manhae Prize (Republic of Korea).
- 2014 — The Dominant Prize (Munich)
- 2015 — «Deti Ra» Magazine Prize, Poetry nomination.
- 2016 — Gold Prize of LiFFt Eurasian and All-Russian Literary Fests.
- 2017 — Annual Leonardo Prize.
- 2018 — Pushkin Prize
- 2020 — Gran-prix, Poetry nomination, Moscow Literary Prize.
- 2023 — Medal “For his Input into Promoting the World Literature” (Resolution of Steering Committee of the LiFFt International Fest at Cairo International Book Fair).
- 2023 — International People’s Diplomacy Commonwealth Medal “For Contributing to Racial Harmony and Special Achievements in International Activity”.

== Major works books ==
- Poetical Cosmos. — Moscow: Sovetsky Pisatel Publishing House, 1989. — 20 000 copies. ISBN 5-265-00956-6
- Computer of Love. — Moscow: Khudozhestvennaya Literatura Publishing House, 1990.
- Assertions of Denies. — Moscow: Center Publishing House, 1991
- Verfliem. — Moscow: DOOS Publishers, 1992
- Vrutselet. — Moscow: DOOS Publishers, 1993
- Gamma tel Gamleta. — Moscow: Yelena Pakhomova Publishers, 1994
- ILI On ili Ada ili Ilion ili Iliada. (Readings in Vadim Sidur Museum Series). — Moscow, 1995
- Ulysses and Nausicaa. — Moscow: Yelena Pakhomova Publishers, 1998
- Metametaphor. — Moscow: DOOS Publishers, 1999.
- Metametaphor Encyclopedia. — Moscow: DOOS Publishers, 2000.
- Parallel Worlds. — Moscow: AiF Print Publishers, 2001.
- Insideout. — Moscow: Mysl Publishing House, 2001.
- Angelic Poetics. — Moscow: Natalia Nesterova University Publishing House, 2001.
- Beyond Apokalypse. — Moscow: AiF Print Publishers, 2002.
- ILI (Or) (Collected Works. Poetry). — Moscow: Mysl Publishing House, 2002.
- Sam-ist-dat. — Moscow: Ruslan Elinin LIA Publishing House, 2003
- Metacode. — Moscow: AiF Print Publishers, 2005.
- Philosophy of Literature. — Moscow: Khudozhestvennaya Literatura Publishing House, 2009. — 200 p. — ISBN 978-5-280-03454-9
- Conductor of Silence: Poems and long poems. — Moscow: Khudozhestvennaya Literatura Publishing House, 2009. — ISBN 978-5-280-03456-3
- (Co-authored with Margarita Al') Assertion of Deny. — Moscow: Ruslan Elinin LIA Publishing House, 2009.
- Nevesta Lokhmataya Svetom: Poems, Long Poems. — Moscow: Aleksandr Gritsenko Producer Center Publishers, 2014. — 5000 copies. (Classics and Contemporaries Series) ISBN 978-5-9906032-0-2
- Voices. Documentary Biographical Mysteria. Moscow: DOOS Publishers, 2016. — ISBN 978-5-906568-08-3
- Glass Robot: Poems and Long poems / Foreword by Andrey Voznesensky. — Moscow: LIFFT Publishers, 2018. — 500 copies. (Golden LiFFt. Russia's Writers Series) ISBN 978-5-604-01615-2
- Partant: Book of Poems. — Moscow: Yevgeny Stepanov’s Publishing House, 2018 (Avangrandy Book Series).

== Gallery ==
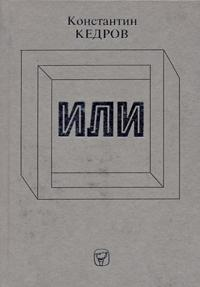
Collection of poems «ILI».

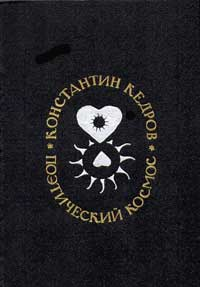
Monograph "Poetic Cosmos" (1989).

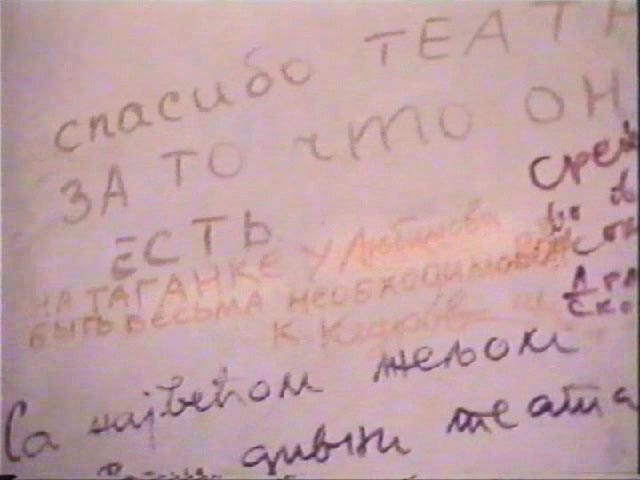
Kedrov 's autograph.

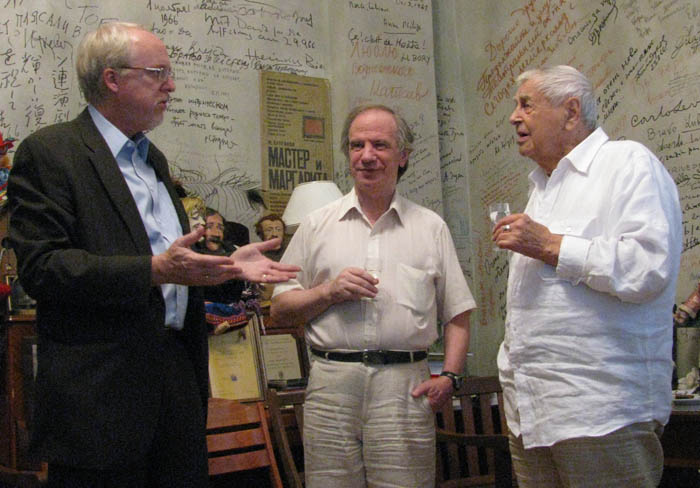
U.S. Ambassador J. Baerli, K. Kedrov and Yu. Lyubimov.

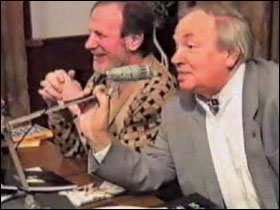
Konstantin Kedrov and Andrei Voznesensky (1997)
