= Lee Si-young (poet) =

South Korean writer (born 1950)

- Born: August 6, 1950 (age 76); Gurye, Korea
- Writing career
- Language: Korean

Korean name
- Hangul: 이시영
- Hanja: 李時英
- RR: I Siyeong
- MR: I Siyŏng

Lee Si-young (Korean: 이시영; born August 6, 1950) is a South Korean writer.

== Life ==
Lee was born in Gurye, Jeollanam-do Province, in Korea in 1950. He began publishing poetry in 1969, leading to his first volume Manweol (Full Moon in 1976). Ten years passed before his second collection. Lee served as vice-president of Chagjak gwa bipyeong Publish Company for many years. He has also worked as the manager of the Creative Writing Center at Dankook University, and in 2012 he entered the position of chairman of the Board of the Writers Association of Korea. .

== Work ==
A poet of delicate sensibilities, Lee began his career depicting the gloomy everyday life under the Park Chung-hee military dictatorship in the 1970s and 1980s from the perspective of ordinary people—the subject he has explored with much love and sympathy. Such love has manifested in his desire to seek more than confessional release in his poetry: Lee aims to transform his art into a song for the suffering masses. His early poems are long and prose-like even, expressing his compassion towards the poor and the weak, and at the same time, embodying his fierce determination to preserve his humanity even amidst hardships.

In the 1990s Lee's poems became drastically shorter in length. Composed of no more than two or three lines, they came to resemble Zen Buddhist poems in their use of minimal language and compacted form to encapsulate profound meaning and symbolic resonance. Lee's poems from this period recall the fact the poet had made his literary debut with sijo or traditional Korean poetry characterized by highly restricted form.

This evolution in lee's poetic style indicates a transition from the intense emotion of his early work toward a more contemplative tone. Lee has started that he views his poems as brief expression intended to connect momentarily with readers. His later poetry reflects a calmer perspective, balancing his personal artistic dedication with an awareness of his experiences as an aging writer.

== Works in Translation ==
- Variations: Three Korean Poets (Cornell Univ East Asia Program, 2002)
- Patterns (Green Integer, 2014)
- Dazwischen: Gedichte (Poems from collection 사이 translated into German by Andreas Schirmer, Edition Peperkorn, 2012)

== Works in Korean (Partial) ==
Poetry collections

- Full Moon (만월, Manwol, 1976),
- Into the Wind (바람 속으로, Baramsokeuro, 1986),
- Lightning Rod and Heart (Piroichimgwa shimjang, 1989),
- Pattern (무늬, Munui, 1994),
- In Between (사이, Sai, 1996),
- Calm and Blue Sky (조용한, 푸른 하늘, Joyonghan pureun haneul, 1997),
- Silver Whistle (은빛 호각, Eunbit hogak, 2003),
- Ocean Lake (바다 호수, Bada hosu, 2004)

== Awards ==
- Seorabeol Literature Award (1994)
- Jeong Ji Yong Literature Award (1996)
