= Mun Jeonghui =

South Korean poet (born 1947)

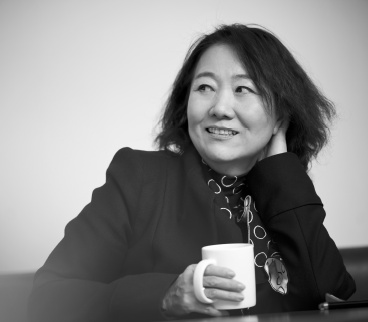
- Born: May 25, 1947 (age 79); Boseong, South Jeolla Province, southern Korea
- Citizenship: South Korean
- Education: PhD
- Alma mater: Dongguk University
- Writing career
- Language: Korean

Korean name
- Hangul: 문정희
- Hanja: 文貞姬
- RR: Mun Jeonghui
- MR: Mun Chŏnghŭi

Mun Jeonghui is a South Korean poet.

== Life ==
Mun Jeonghui was born in Boseong, South Jeolla Province, southern Korea on May 25, 1947. She attended Jinmyeong Girls' High School, majored in Korean Literature at Dongguk University, and completed her graduate studies from the same university, where she has also taught. While still in high school, she published her first collection of poems, Kkotsum (1965). In 1969 Mun Jeonghui made her debut in literature when her poems "Bulmyeon" (Insomnia) and "Haneul" (Sky) were accepted in Wolgan Munhak's feature on new poets. In 2014, she served as the chairman of the Society of Korean Poets.

== Work ==
The core of Mun Jeonghui's poetry reveals a distinctly romantic consciousness, expressed in crystalline language, dominated by a complex interplay of vivid emotions and sensations. Her fine, occasionally startling poetic sensibility is best represented in the poem Hwangjiniui norae:

No, that isn't it. Even with little sunlight / with love alone / that is shy of new faces / like flowers of grass / I want to knock my whole body against a massive wall / and fall.

Mun's similes and metaphors are entirely subjective, having been internalized to chart the evolutions and dramas of her own emotions. Her figurative language becomes a register of her sensitivity, and movingly treats the themes of romantic love, reticence, suffering, and freedom. In a few poems such as Potatoes (Gamja), Saranghaneun samacheon dangsinege and Namhangangeul barabomyeo, Mun Jeonghui makes use of the elements of fairy tale narratives in order to arrive at an allegorical distillation of present reality.

== Works in translation ==
- Windflower (문정희 시선)
- Woman on the Terrace (양귀비꽃 머리에 꽂고)
- Die Mohnblume im Haar (문정희 시선-어린 사랑에게)
- Celle qui mangeait le riz froid (édition Bruno Doucey, 2012), trans. Kim Hyun-ja

== Works in Korean (partial) ==
- Kkotsum (1965)
- Mun Jeonghui Sijip (1973)
- Honja muneojineun jongsori (1984)
- Aunaeui sae (1986), Geuriun naui jip (1987)
- Je momsoge salgo inneun saereul kkeonaeeo juseyo (1990)

== Awards ==
- Contemporary Literature (Hyundae Munhak) Award (1975)
- Sowol Poetry Prize (1996)
- Jeong Jiyong Literature Prize (2004)
