= Manhae Prize =

South Korean award series

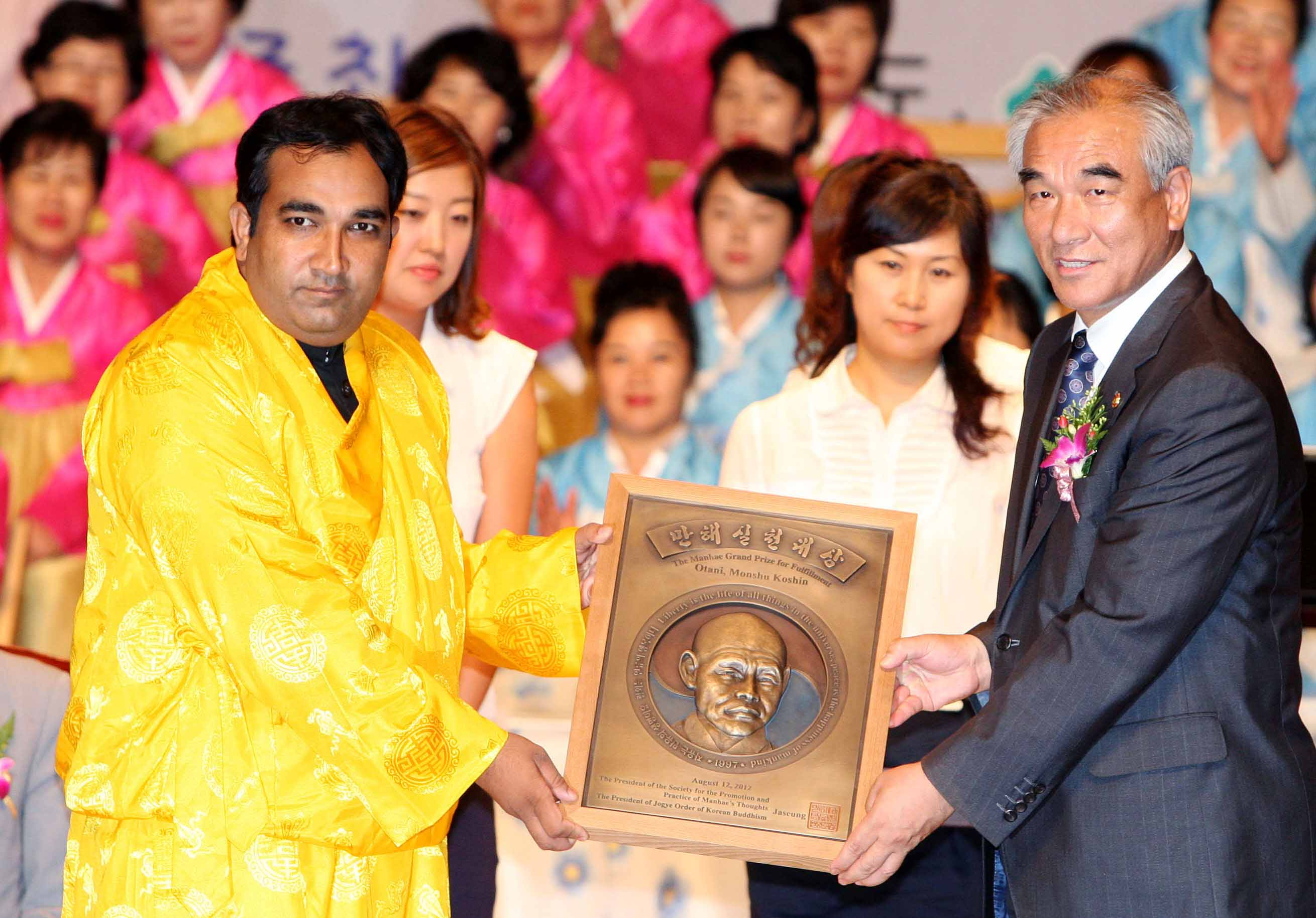
Dr. M.K. Otani receiving Manhae Prize from Mr. Kim, Cultural and Sport Minister of South Korea

The Manhae Prize is a series of awards in the following categories: Peace, Social Service, Academic Excellence, Art, Literature, and Buddhist Missionary Work awarded by The Society for the Promotion and Practice of Manhae's Thoughts in memory of Buddhist reformer and anti-Japanese independence activist Han Yong-un (1879–1944).

== Awardees ==
=== Peace Prize winners ===
Year	Name	Country	Role/Reason	Ref
2008	Lokamitra (Jeremy Goody)		Member of the Triratna Buddhist Community	
2009	Shirin Ebadi	Iran	Iranian human rights advocate, winner of Nobel Prize for Peace	
2013	World Fellowship of Buddhists			
2014	Mohsen Makhmalbaf	Iran	Iranian film director	
2015	Alexis Dudden	U.S.A	Professor of History at University of Connecticut	
2019	Haruki Wada	Japan	professor at the University of Tokyo	
2020	Phra Bodhirak	Thailand	monk and founder of Santi Asoke	

=== Practice Prize winners ===
Year	Name	Country	Role/Reason	Ref
2012	Kurt Gribl	DE	Mayor of the Friedensstadt Augsburg	
2013	Dagon Taryar	MM	Writer and democracy advocate	
2014	Se-Chung Lee	KO	Lawyer	
2015	Cheoung-Jeoun	KO	Buddhist monk	
2015	Rainbow Community - Noel-El Cheoun	IE	Priest	
2019	National Emergency Medical Center			
2020	Um Hong-gil	KO	Mountaineer and philanthropist	
2020	Sun Young-sung	KO	Director of the Keimyung University Deagu Dongsan Hospital	

=== Literature Prize winners ===
- 1990: Hyun Ki-young (novelist)
- 1998: Ko Un (poet)
- 1999: Chung Wan-young
- 2000: Oh Sae-young
- 2001: Lee Hung-ki
- 2002: Shin Kyung-rim
- 2003: Jo Jung-rae
- 2004: Hong Seok-jung, first DPRK author
- 2005: Wole Soyinka
- 2006 Joint winners: Robert Pinsky, Hwang Dong-gyu
- 2007: Kim Nam-jo
- 2008: Lee Eo-ryeong
- 2009 Joint winners: Robert Hass, Kim Jong-gil
- 2010 Joint winners: John Ralston Saul President of International PEN, Jeong Jin-gyu editor of Modern Poetry, Seoul.
- 2011: Mo Yan
- 2012: Kim Jay Hong
- 2013: Konstantin Kedrov (poet), Ingo Schulze
- 2014 Joint winners: Ashraf Dali, Egyptian poet and writer Yoon Yang-hee, calligrapher, Korea
- 2015 Joint winners: Young-Bok shin professor, SoungKongHoe University, Korea, Hyon-Jong Jeong, Poet, Korea, Byong-Kee Hwang, Master of Korean classical music, Korea
- 2016: Lee In-hwi, labor literature author
- 2019 Joint winners: Im Young-woong (theatre director) and Kim Uchang (Professor Emeritus of Korea University)
- 2020 Joint winners: Kim Joo-young (writer) and Shin Dal-ja (poet)
