= Lee Garim =

South Korean writer (born 1943)

- Born: 1943 (age 82–83); Yolha, Manchuria
- Writing career
- Language: Korean

Korean name
- Hangul: 이가림
- RR: I Garim
- MR: I Karim

Lee Garim (Korean: 이가림; born 1943) is a South Korean writer.

== Life ==
Lee Garim was born in Yolha, Manchuria. He graduated from Song Kyun Kwan University and Graduate School with a degree in French Literature. He received his Ph.D. in French Literature from Rouen University in France. He has lectured at Sungjon University, Songshin's Women's University, Rouen University, Inha University, and worked as a producer at MBC in Daejeon, Korea. Lee has also served as the Vice-President of the French Language and Literature Association of Korea.

== Work ==
LTI Korea summarizes Lee's work:

Lee Garim’s poetry is characterized by exquisite use of language and careful attention to the creation of poetic imageries. His interest in French philosopher Gaston Bachelard stems from his search for the materiality of imagination. While he maintains a nostalgic attitude towards harmonious life in his poetry, he also maximizes linguistic creativity through the use of powerfully contrasting images.

Lee Garim's collections include Ice Age (Binghagi, 1973), With the Forehead Against the Window (Yurichangae imareul daego, 1981), and Sad Peninsula (Seulpeun bando, 1989). Lee Garim has also translated works by Gaston Bachelard including The Flame of a Candle (Chotbul-ui mihak) and Water and Dreams (Mulgwa kkum). He has been awarded Jung Jiyong Literature Prize.

Major poems include “A Book of Winter Lithographs” (Gyeoul panhwajip, 1966), “Proust’s Letters” (Peuruseuteu-ui pyeonji, 1966), “Iris of Many Colors” (Dasaek-ui nundongja, 1969), “Between Five and Seven O’Clock” (Daseotsiwa ilgopsi sai, 1970), “Night Watchers” (Yagyeongkkun, 1970), “A Violet” (Orangkaekkot, 1973), “Weed” (Ppul, 1979), and “A Top” (Paengi, 1985).

== Works in translation ==
French

- Le Front Contre la Fenêtre (유리창에 이마를 대고)

== Works in Korean (partial) ==
- “A Book of Winter Lithographs” (Gyeoul panhwajip, 1966)
- “Proust’s Letters” (Peuruseuteu-ui pyeonji, 1966)
- “Iris of Many Colors” (Dasaek-ui nundongja, 1969)
- “Between Five and Seven O’Clock” (Daseotsiwa ilgopsi sai, 1970)
- “Night Watchers” (Yagyeongkkun, 1970)
- “A Violet” (Orangkaekkot, 1973)
- “Weed” (Ppul, 1979),
- "A Top” (Paengi, 1985

== Awards ==
- Korean PEN Translation Award
- Idealistic Work Award
- PEN Poetry Award
- Jeong Ji-Yong Prize
