= Yoo An-jin =

South Korean writer (born 1941)

- Born: April 21, 1941 (age 85)
- Education: Seoul National University Teacher's College, University of Florida
- Writing career
- Language: Korean

Korean name
- Hangul: 유안진
- Hanja: 柳岸津
- RR: Yu Anjin
- MR: Yu Anjin

Yoo An-jin (This is the author's preferred Romanization per LTI Korea, or Hangul: 유안진) is a South Korean poet, essayist, and professor.

== Life ==
Yoo An-jin was born April 21, 1941, in Andong, Gyeongsangbuk-do. Yu graduated from Seoul National University Teacher's College's Department of Education and then received her graduate degree and Ph.D. in Education from the University of Florida. She has taught at Dankook University and Seoul National University. Her literary debut was in 1965.

== Work ==
Yu first became famous for her essays, beginning with her contribution to the prose collection Dreaming of a Beautiful Friendship (Jiranjigyo leul ggum ggumyeo, 지란지교를 꿈꾸며, 1986). The book, which also included essays by Yi Hyang-a and Gim Dal-jin, met with great popular acclaim, and made her name practically a household word. The lyrical style of her essays won her the hearts of many sensitive middle and high school students. This led to Yu's expanding her talent to other literary genres including educational essays such as "Child Education in Traditional Korean Society."

Yu has carried out various aesthetic experiments in her attempts to establish a position and identity for contemporary woman. She attempts to casts a soft revelatory light on areas of society which have gone unnoticed. Her poetic voice, most often a mother, wife, sister or daughter-in-law, speak to the reader in a soft tone, while closely observing the world around them to seek salvation in their complex lives.

Yu's work explores the inner self as revealed through the small details of daily life. Her writing addresses tensions between self and world through by examining various aspects of women's lives. Rather than employing direct slogans, her work uses a poetic and understated style.

Yu has received many awards including the 1990 간행물윤리위원회 간행물 윤리상, the 1996 12회 펜문학상, the 1998 10th Jeong Ji-young Literature Prize, the 2000 35th Woltan Literature Prize (2003), and the 2012 44th Korean Poet's Association Prize.

== Works in translation ==
- 春雨一袋子 (유안진 시선집-봄비 한 주머니)

== Works in Korean (partial) ==
Poetry Collections

- Beneath the Moon (Dalha)
- Poems of Despair (Jeolmangsipyeon)
- To the Water, to the Wind (Mullo balameuro)
- Winged Vestments (Nalgaeot)
- Christ, My Love of Old (Geuriseudo, yet aein)
- Melody Drenched in Moonlight (Dalbiche jeonneun garak)
- Everlasting Exclamation (Yeongwonhan neukkimpyo)

Personal Essays

- Dreaming of a Good and Noble Friendship (Jiranjigyoreul kkumkkumyeo)
- In Search of the Scars of My Soul (Nae yeonghonui sangcheoreul chajaseo)
- Fragrance! O Fragrance of Love! (Hyanggiyeo sarangui hyanggiyeo).

== Awards ==
- 1990 간행물윤리위원회 간행물 윤리상
- 1996 제12회 펜문학상
- 1998 10th Jeong Ji-young Literature Prize
- 2000 35th Woltan Literature Prize
- 2012 44th Korean Poet's Association Prize
