= Shin Dong-yup (poet) =

Korean poet (1930–1969)

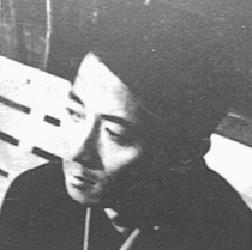
- Born: August 18, 1930; Buyeo, South Chungcheong, Korea
- Died: April 7, 1969 (aged 38); Seoul
- Occupation: Poet
- Spouse: In Byung-sun
- Writing career
- Genre: Poetry
- Notable awards: Order of Cultural Merit (Silver crown)

Korean name
- Hangul: 신동엽
- Hanja: 申東曄
- RR: Sin Dongyeop
- MR: Sin Tongyŏp

Art name
- Hangul: 석림
- Hanja: 石林
- RR: Seokrim
- MR: Sŏngnim

Shin Dong-yup (August 18, 1930 – April 4, 1969) was a Korean poet.

== Life ==
=== Early life ===
Shin Dong-yup was born on August 18, 1930, in Buyeo, South Chungcheong Province, Korea. In 1944, he graduated from Buyeo Elementary School at the head of his class and then attended Jeonju Normal School. The tuition, room and board were paid by the Korean government. According to the book, National Poet Shin Dong-yup by the poet Kim Eung-gyo, his father, Shin Yeon-sun, discovered his talent for writing. Despite their poverty, his father taught him how to write when Shin Dong-yup was six years old.

=== School life ===
In 1948, Shin Dong-yup was expelled from the Normal School as a consequence of student protests against Syngman Rhee, and in particular for disagreeing with the South Korean president's land reform policy and inaction on liquidating pro-Japanese assets. He was transferred to teach at an elementary school in Buyeo, as he was already certified as a teacher. However, he quit his job and entered Dankook University, majoring in history. His father was a judicial scrivener, but he could not support his son financially with his low pay, so he had to sell his farm.

=== Korean War ===
Shin Dong-yup had to return to his hometown when the Korean War broke out in 1950. The North Korean People's Army took over Buyeo on July 15, 1950. The North Korean People's Army intended to implement communist land reform. Shin Dong-yup was not interested in political issues, but he was employed by the Democratic and National Youth Alliance and worked there until late September 1950. The army exploited his knowledge of organization and business. He agreed with communist ideas regarding social reforms, although he was an anarchist. He was drafted into the National Defense Corps in late 1950. After the dissolution of the army, he caught liver distoma from eating crabs.

=== Debut as a writer ===
In 1953, Shin Dong-yup applied to become an air force candidate and passed. However, after graduation from Dankook University, he remained unassigned to a billet. He then moved to Donam-dong, Seongbuk District, Seoul, and opened a secondhand bookstore near his home. At that time, Shin Dong-yup met his future wife, In Byung-sun, who was a senior at Ewha Girls' High School. He married In Byung-sun and they returned to his hometown. In Byung-sun opened a boutique in Buyeo to overcome poverty, and Shin Dong-yup was assigned to Joosan Agriculture High School in Boryeong, South Chungcheong Province. He quit teaching because of tuberculosis, and fell into reading and writing after he sent his wife and children to stay with his wife's parents.

In 1959, he won The Chosun Ilbo annual spring literary contest with The Talking Ploughman's Earth, and he made his debut as a writer under his pen name, Seok Lim. He recovered from tuberculosis and started working at Education Criticism Publisher in Seoul. He wrote Student Revolution collection of poems and protested in the April Revolution. This is why Shin Dong-yup is often referenced as the "April Revolution poet" by many writers. He was able to write "Who Said Who Looked Up At The Sky" and "Husk, Be Gone" based on his experiences in the April Revolution. In 1961, he was hired as a teacher for an evening section at the Myung-Sung Girls' High School, where he immersed himself in writing poems. He graduated from Konkuk University's graduate school with a master's degree in Korean Literature in 1964. In 1963, he published a poetry collection, Asanyeo, and an epic poem, Keumkang.

His liver distoma worsened, and this eventually turned into liver cancer. He died at age 38 on April 7, 1969.

== Commemoration after death ==
=== Grave ===
On April 9, 1969, he was buried at the foot of Wollong Mountain, Geumchon-eup, Paju-gun, Gyeonggi-do, and a tombstone was erected on December 14. The mausoleum moved to Buyeo in November 1993 and settled on a mountain across from Neungsan-ri tomb.

=== Shin Dong-yeop Literature Museum ===
In Buyeo-gun, the Shin Dong-yeop Literature Hall was opened on May 3, 2013, with a total area of 800m^{2} behind his birthplace.

== Education ==
- Buyeo Elementary school
- Jeonju Normal school
- Dankook University
- Konkuk University graduate school

== Poems ==
Shin Dong-yup published many poems such as "Husk, Be Gone", which criticized the opportunists swept up by democratic power and also "March", "Farm", and "The Sky We Saw". He wrote epic poems, including The Talking Ploughman's Earth, Woman's Life, and more than ten critiques. In 1989, his poem "On the hills and mountains" was included in middle school textbooks.

The following is a Korean to English translation of his most famous poem, "Husk, Be Gone".

껍데기는 가라

껍데기는 가라.
사월도 알맹이만 남고
껍데기는 가라.

껍데기는 가라
동학년(東學年) 곰나루의,
그 아우성만 살고
껍데기는 가라.

그리하여, 다시
껍데기는 가라.

이곳에선, 두 가슴과 그곳까지 내논
아사달 아사녀가
중립의 초례청 앞에 서서
부끄럼 빛내며
맞절할지니

껍데기는 가라.
한라에서 백두까지
향그러운 흙가슴만 남고
그, 모오든 쇠붙이는 가라.

Translation:

Husk, be gone

Husk, be gone;
April, let your husk
go and your grain remain.

Husk, be gone;
Let only the shouting
of the Tonghak revolution
remain, its husk gone.

And again, husk, be gone
from this land

in which a native lad meets his lass,
heart to heart,
free and easy;
they will welcome each other
for the marriage of minds
in the peace hall
of neutrality.

Husk, be gone
from Mount Halla in the south
to Mount Paektu in the north;
Let all glinting metals go
and only sweet earth remain.

The government prohibited the sale of the book immediately after it was published, as the poetry was symbolic of democratization.

== Work ==
- Shin Dong-yup (1963). Asanyeo. Munhaksa.
- Shin Dong-yup (1975). Shin Dong-yup collection. ChangjangguaBipyungsa.
- Shin Dong-yup, Shin Gyeong-rim (1988). Fallen down like a flower. Shilchunmunhaksa.
- Shin Dong-yup (1989). Who said who looked up the sky. ChangjangguaBipyungsa.
- Shin Dong-yup (1989). Keumkang. ChangjangguaBipyungsa.
- Shin Dong-yup (1989). Who said who looked up the sky (revised edition). ChangjangguaBipyungsa.
- Shin Dong-yup (1991). Husk, be gone. Miraesa.

== After death ==
=== The Shin Dong-yup Prize for Literature ===
The Shin Dong-yup creation fund was created in 1982. The Shin Dong-yup Prize for Literature is granted every year.

=== Shin Dong-yup literary house ===
The Shin Dong-yup literary house was opened near Shin Dong-yup's birthplace on May 3, 2013.

=== Prizes ===
- Order of Cultural Merit (Silver crown)
