= Song Sugwon =

South Korean writer (1940–2016)

- Born: March 15, 1940; Goheung County, South Jeolla Province
- Died: April 4, 2016 (aged 76)
- Writing career
- Language: Korean

Korean name
- Hangul: 송수권
- Hanja: 宋秀權
- RR: Song Sugwon
- MR: Song Sugwŏn

Song Sugwon, also Song Soo-Kwon (Korean: 송수권, March 15, 1940 – April 4, 2016), was a modern South Korean writer.

== Life ==
Song Sugwon was born on March 15, 1940, in Goheung County, South Jeolla Province. Song attended Suncheon Normal School and Goheung Junior High School before from Sorabol Arts College with a degree in Creative Writing. Song worked at the Kwangju Yogwang Girls Middle School as both a teacher and an educational researcher.

== Career ==
Of Song Sugwon's poetry, the Korea Literature Translation Institute wrote:

Bitterness is the most salient sentiment in this Song Sugweon's work; but his poetry emphasizes not the typical sentiment of a weak bitterness giving rise to self-contempt, but rather, within that bitterness, a dignified masculine identity of immanent intimacy and power. He has published many works that succeed in preserving the flavor and style of the southern dialects, designed to inspire the people through a consciousness of history and regional differences.

Song's work centers on the lives of common people, although Song does not see live as a confrontation between have and have-nots, and Song's work follows the lines of classical Korean lyricism. Having lived in South Jeolla Province most of his life, including at the time of his death, Song Sugwon was able to infuse his poetry with the regional culture.

== Works in Korean (partial) ==
=== Poetry ===
- At the Temple Gate (산문에 기대어, 1980)
- Dreaming Island (꿈꾸는 섬, 1982)
- Mute Porcelain (아도(啞陶), 1984)
- Bird! Bird! O Bluebird! (새야 새야 파랑새야, 1986)
- Our Land (우리들의 땅, 1988)
- Even in Sleep I Smile at the Thought of You (자다가도 그대 생각하면 웃는다, 1991)
- Watchman on a Starry Night (별밤지기, 1992)
- Wildflower World (들꽃 세상, 1999)
- Green Prison (초록의감옥, 1999)
- Pacheonmu (파천무(破天舞), 2001)
- Planting a Joseon Plum Tree in the Frozen Ground (언 땅에 조선매화 한 그루 심고, 2005)
- A Country Road or a Liquor-Barrel (시골길 또는 술통, 2007)
- Magpie food (까치밥), Unknown)

=== Prose ===
- Once Again At the Temple Gate (다시 산문에 기대어, 1985)
- Love Folds Its Huge Wings (사랑이 커다랗게 날개를 접고, 1989)
- Journey to the South (남도(南道) 기행, 1990)
- Indigo World (쪽빛 세상, 1998)
- Mandala Sea (만다라의 바다, 2002)

== Awards ==
- Ministry of Culture and Information Arts Award (문공부 예술상)
- Geumho Cultural Foundation Arts award (금호문화재단 예술상)
- Jeollanam-do Culture award (전라남도 문화상)
- Sowol Poetry Prize (1987)
