= Writers Association of Korea =

South Korean writers' society

- 한국작가회의
- Formation: November 18, 1987
- Chairman: Yi Kyoung-ja
- Website: www.hanjak.or.kr

Korean name
- Hangul: 한국작가회의
- Hanja: 韓國作家會議
- RR: Hanguk jakga hoeui
- MR: Han'guk chakka hoeŭi

The Writers Association of Korea (Korean: 한국작가회의) is a society formed by writers of South Korea to promote Korean literature and support Korean writers.

== History ==
On November 18, 1974, the Council of Writers for Freedom and Practice (자유실천문인협의회) was established by a number of writers including Ko Un to protect the rights of writers, and started a campaign to free the poet Kim Ji-ha from imprisonment. In 1987, the group expanded to become the Association of Writers for National Literature, and then in 2007 it was renamed the Writers Association of Korea.

The association has 14 chapters and 18 branches nationwide, and divisions for various genres including fiction, poetry, sijo, children's literature, and criticism. It had around 200 members as of 2010. The office is located in Yonghyeon Building, 50-1 Yonggang-dong, Mapo-gu, Seoul.

Past chairpersons include Lee Si-young, Gu Jungseo and Jeong Hui Seong.
