= Pak Hui-jin =

South Korean poet (1931–2015)

Pak Huijin
- Born: December 4, 1931; Keiki Province, Korea, Empire of Japan
- Died: March 31, 2015 (aged 83)
- Education: Korea University
- Occupations: Teacher, poet
- Writing career
- Language: Korean

Korean name
- Hangul: 박희진
- Hanja: 朴喜璡
- RR: Bak Huijin
- MR: Pak Hŭijin

Pak Huijin (Korean: 박희진; December 4, 1931 – March 31, 2015) was a South Korean poet.

== Biography ==
Pak Huijin was born in Keiki Province, Korea, Empire of Japan on December 4, 1931. In 1956 at the age of 25, three of his poems were recommended to the arts journal Literary Art, thus beginning his formal career as a poet. His love of literature, however, was apparent from a very young age. He recalls that when he was asked as a primary school student about his dream for the future, he answered unhesitatingly, "to become a writer." Due to the colonial circumstances of the time, he spoke and wrote in Japanese, and because his first encounters with literature were in Japanese, he was greatly interested in Japanese novels and poetry, especially the haiku.

Pak attended Korea University, where he majored in English, and worked as a teacher at Tongseong Junior High and High School. He was a member of the Sahwajip literary club in the 1960s, and also a member of the poetry reading club Space.

Pak Huijin, who remained single his entire life, admitted in his own words, "I married poetry." He refrained from participation in writers' groups which often fell into the snares of political ideology, rather devoting himself to the perfecting of his poetic art. He has boasted that he "made real contributions to the literary coterie magazine movement in Korea," and also had great pride as the poet "who first truly experimented with the poetry recitation movement." Defining poets as those who are "insanely in love with words," he emphasized that poets "must pour every ounce of their effort into language".

== Career ==
Pak Huijin's poetry starkly contrasts heaven and earth and contradictions between light and darkness. Following Korea's liberation from Japan, Pak engrossed himself in writing poetry in his mother tongue. At first his Korean was inelegant, but he strove to create his own poetic world, drawing upon artistic trends from both inside and outside Korea. Having majored in English literature at university, Pak was heavily influenced by Romantic poets like T. S. Eliot and W. B. Yeats, as well as the German poet Rainer Maria Rilke and the French poet Paul Valéry. Pak also received great inspiration from traditionalist Korean poets, such as his contemporaries, the renowned Seo Jeong-ju and Yu Chi-hwan, as well as Jo Jihun, Pak Mok-wol and Pak Dujin, both of whom wrote traditional nature poetry.

Unusually for modern Korean poets, Pak Huijin also wrote traveling poems, primarily as a result of his extensive travel in the United States and Europe.

== Works ==
=== Works in translation ===
- Himmelsnetz (박희진 시선)
- Sunrise Over the East Sea (박희진 시선)

=== Works in Korean (partial) ===
- Chamber Music (실내악, 1960)
- The Bronze Age (청동시대, 1965)
- Smiling Silence (미소하는 침묵, 1970)
- Beneath the Seoul Sky (서울의 하늘 아래, 1979)
- Three Hundred and Fourteen Four-Line Poems (사행 시 삼백 십사 편, 1982)
- The Stream in My Heart (가슴속의 시냇물, 1982)
- Dreams in Iowa (아이오와에서 꿈에, 1985)
- Lovers in the Lilacs (라일락 속의 연인들, 1985)
- Poet, Be a Prophet! (시인아, 너는 선지자 되라, 1985)
- The Song of Scattered Petals (산화가, 1988)
- The Azaleas of Bukhan Mountain (북한산의 진달래, 1990)
- 300 Four-Line Verses (사행시 삼백수, 1991)
- The Buddha in the Lotus Blossom (연꽃속의 부처님, 1993)
- The Pines at Morundae (몰운대의 소나무, 1995)
- Seven Hundred One-Line Verses (일행시칠백수, 1997)
- A Hundred Views at a Hundred Temples (백사백경, 1999)
- Spiritual Songs of the Hwarang (화랑영가, 1999)
- Twenty Views from Tong River (동강이십경, 1999)
- Sky, Earth, Human (하늘 땅 사람, 2000)
- Bak Huijin's World Travel Poetry Collection (박희진의 세계기행 시집, 2001)
- Four Hundred Four-Line Verses (사행시 사백수, 2002)
- Nine-Hundred and Sixty One-Line Verses and Seven Hundred and Thirty Seventeen-Word Verses, and More (1행시 960수와 17자시 730수 기타, 2003)
- Tamna Island as It Dreams (꿈꾸는 탐라섬, 2004)

== Awards ==
- Woltan Literary Award (1976)
- Prize of Modern Poetry (1988)
- Poetry Prize of the Korean Poets' Association
