= Heo Manha =

Korean poet (born 1932)

Heo Manha (born 1932) is a Korean poet. He was a professor of medicine for decades, and after he retired, he actively published poetry collections and received many literary awards. His poems contemplate nature, reason history and explore the source of existence.

== Life ==
=== Youth ===
He was born in 1932 in Daegu. When he was a teenager, he wanted to be a physicist after seeing a Japanese physicist, Hideki Yukawa, receive the Nobel Prize in Physics for discovering neutrons, determined to surpass Japan as a scientist. But he faced his own limitation and gave up on physics and went to a medical school, instead. He became seriously interested in literature as he took a literary class at college. What made him attracted to poetry was that it allowed him to explore a world beyond the cause-and-effect relationship, as opposed to pathology that is a mechanism separating self and the other. Particularly, he was immerged in reading Rilke’s poems and studied the philosophy of Merleau-Ponty, deeply plunging into existentialism.

=== Works after his debut ===
He debuted as a poet in 1957 when he received recommendation for his poems “Gwasil (과실 Fruits),” “Nalgae (날개 Wings)” and “Kkot (꽃 Flowers).” But after his first poetry collection, Haejo (해조 Seaweeds) was published in 1969, he stopped writing poems for about 30 years. It was because he focused on his career as a professor of a medical school while doing research on pathology for decades after he graduated from college with honors. When he retired from the professorship, he actively began to release poetry collections. As soon as his second collection, Bineun sujikeuro seoseo jungneunda (비는 수직으로 서서 죽는다 Rain Falls Plumb Down), was released in 1999, he received favorable comments from the literary critics and the media and won many literary awards for his collections he published for the next 3–4 years. He published many poetry collections including Yasaengui kkot (야생의 꽃 Wild Flowers) (2006), Badaui seongbun (바다의 성분 What the Ocean Consists of) (2009) and an essay collection titled Cheongmapunggyeong (청마풍경 Landscape with a Blue Horse) (2005).

== Writing ==
=== Science meets art ===
The basic of pathology, observation and analysis, is the framework of Heo’s poetry. His poems often use a motif of vast nature, such as a stratum, cliff, slope, fossil and the ocean, which has been preserved from time immemorial. In the poem, “Haejo (해조 Seaweed)” in Seaweeds (1969), he is reminded of the time when he served in the Korean War while seeing the seaweeds that has dried up on rocks. In another poem, “Jicheung (지층 Strata),” he traces the chronicle of human beings who have fought with stone axes since the primitive ages.

His imagination that arises from his observing nature and tracing the history back to the origins is supported by a wealth of scientific knowledge. For example, in “Donggiui bawi (동기의 바위 Sibling’s Rock)” in Wild Flowers (2006), he illustrates rocks in association with siblings based on the proportion of silicon in his blood. And given the fact that the iron in human’s blood is red, he says that the sunset of the Paleozoic era flows in his blood vessel. Like this, Heo has established a distinguished poetic world of his own based on scientific knowledge and his literary imagination beyond that.

=== Language of verticality ===
As time passes, nature is continuously created and disappears. Rain Falls Plumb Down (1999) illustrates his sense of futility as anything on earth is present temporarily and ceases to exist after all. However, raindrops disappear in vain, yet, leave rain prints behind on rocks. In “Ujue mongmareum (우주의 목마름 Thirst of the Universe)” the poets reads the last will of life carved by raindrops as he watches rain prints from the Cretaceous period of the Mesozoic Era. And by capturing the ephemeral existence of an object, the poet tries to give meaning to the things becoming extinct. Just like a bird that soars up vertically against gravity, he also dreams of poetic ascent beyond the principle of causality of this world.

In order to penetrate into an object and testify its fundamental being, a poet needs to discover a new language. Heo rules out cliché and an ordinary language and explores existence by defamiliarizing language. In the title poem, "Siui gyejeoleun gyeoulida (시의 계절은 겨울이다 The Season of Poetry is Winter)" of the poetry collection with the same title, the poet describes himself as a “fragile language that seeks for the world’s extreme.” It is natural that “the season of poetry is winter” because poetry always leaves its center to be headed for the periphery. However, the poet believes that his language sprouts out just like grass in spring.

== Awards ==
- 1999 Sanghwa Poetry Award (상화시인상) (“Sangcheo (상처 Scar),” “Toiraeriui toreuso (퇴래리의 토르소Torso in Twerae-ri)”)
- 1999 Park Yongrae Literary Award (박용래문학상) (Rain Falls Plumb Down)
- 2000 Society of Korean Poets Award (Rain Falls Plumb Down)
- 2003 Isan Literature Prize (Water Flows toward Thirst)
- 2003 The Republic of Korea's Bogwan Order of Cultural Merit
- 2004 Cheongma Literary Award (청마문학상) (Landscape with a Blue Horse)
- 2006 Yi Yuksa Poetry Prize (Wild Flowers)
- 2009 Mogwol Literature Prize (What the Ocean Consist of)
- 2013 National Academy of Arts Award

== Works ==
=== Anthologies ===
- 《허만하 시선집》, 솔, 2005 / Heomanha siseonjip (Anthology of Heo Manha’s Poetry), Sol, 2005

=== Poetry collections ===
- 《해조》, 삼애사, 1969 / Haejo (Seaweeds), Samaesa, 1969
- 《비는 수직으로 서서 죽는다》, 솔, 1999 / Bineun sujikeuro seoseo jungneunda (Rain Falls Plumb Down), Sol, 1999.
- 《물은 목마름 쪽으로 흐른다》, 솔, 2002 / Muleun mongmareum jjokeuro heureunda (Water Flows toward Thirst), Sol, 2002
- 《야생의 꽃》, 솔, 2006 / Yasaengui kkot (Wild Flowers), Sol, 2006
- 《바다의 성분》, 솔, 2009 / Badaui seongbun (What the Ocean Consists of), Sol, 2009
- 《시의 계절은 겨울이다》, 문예중앙, 2013 / Siui gyejeoleun gyeoulida (The Season of Poetry is Winter), Munye Joongang, 2013
- 《언어 이전의 별빛》, 솔, 2018 / Eoneo ijeonui byeolbit (Starlight before Language), Sol, 2018

=== Poetics ===
- 《시의 근원을 찾아서》, 랜덤하우스코리아, 2005 / Siui geunwoneul chajaseo (In Pursuit of Source of Poetry), Random House Korea, 2005

=== Literary Coterie, Co-authored Collection ===
- 〈인체해부도〉 외, 허만하 외, 《기괴한 서커스》, 사문난적, 2010 / “Inchehaebudo (Anatomical Chart)” et al, Gigoihan seokeoseu (Bizarre Circus), Samunnanjeok, 2010
- 〈비의 동행〉 외, 허만하 외, 《살구 칵테일》, 사문난적, 2012 / “Biui donghaeng (Accompany of Rain)” et al, Salgu kakteil (Apricot Cocktail), Samunnanjeok, 2012
- 〈노을 앞에서〉 외, 허만하 외, 《순진한 짓》, 사문난적, 2014 / Noeul apeseo (In Front of Sunset)” et al, Sunjinhan jit (Naïve Things to Do), Samunnanjeok, 2014

=== Essay Collections ===
- 《부드러운 시론》, 열음사, 1992 / Budeureoun siron (Gentle Poetics), Yeoleumsa, 1992
- 《모딜리아니의 눈》, 빛남, 1997 / Modilianiui nun (Modigliani's Eyes), Bitnam, 1997
- 《낙타는 십리 밖 물냄새를 맡는다》, 솔, 2000 / Naktaneun simli bak mulnaemsaereul matneunda (Camels Can Smell Water from Far Away), Sol, 2000
- 《길과 풍경과 시》, 솔, 2002 / Gilgwa pungkyeongkwa si (Road, Landscape and Poetry), Sol, 2002
- 《길 위에서 쓴 편지》, 솔, 2004 / Gilwieseo sseun pyeonji (Letter Written on the Road), Sol, 2004
- 《청마풍경》, 솔, 2005 / Cheongmapunggyeong (Landscape with a Blue Horse), Sol, 2005
