= Inchon Award =

Academic award of South Korea

- Country: South Korea
- Presented by: Inchon Memorial Association and The Dong-a Ilbo
- First award: 1987
- Website: The Inchon Memorial Foundation

- Inchon Award
- Hangul: 인촌상
- Hanja: 仁村賞
- RR: Inchonsang
- MR: Inch'onsang

The Inchon Award (Korean: 인촌상) is a prize given to individuals in public service, journalists, and academics for achievements in their field. The award is named after the nickname of Kim Seong-su; the second Vice President of South Korea and founder of Korea University, The Dong-a Ilbo and Gyeongseong Textiles. The annual award is presented with a prize of KRW 100 million, a citation and a medal on October 11 which is Kim's birthday.

== Laureates ==
Year	Education	Media (Press)	Literature	Academics	Industrial Technology	Public Service
1987	–	Ham Seok-heon (함석헌)	Hwang Sun-won (황순원)	Lee Ho Wang (이호왕); Korea University	–	Kkottongnae of Jesus Foundation (꽃동네)
1988	Cho Yongku (조용구); Baemyung Academy	–	Pak Tu-jin (박두진)	Kim Wonyong (김원용); Seoul National University	–	–
1989	–	–	Kim Seong-han (김성한)	Lee Eunung (이은웅); Seoul National University	Choe Taeseop (최태섭); LX Glas	Choe Gwihui (최귀희); Freedom Rehabilitation Center
1990	Lee Sanghun (이상훈); Personality Development Research Institute	–	Pak Kyongni (박경리)	Lee Ki-baik (이기백); Hallym University	–	–
1991	–	Bak Gwonsang (박권상)	Pak Jaesam (박재삼)	Baek Yonggyun (백용균); Hanyang University	Kim Seonhong (김선홍); Kia	Kim Ki-chang (김기창); Korea Association of the Deaf
1992	Lee Changro (이창로); Daegwang Academy	Christian Broadcasting System (기독교방송)	Yun Seokjung (윤석중)	Kim Taegil (김태길); Seoul National University	–	Yu Gyeongun (유경운); Yeosu Aeyang Rehabilitation Hospital
1993	Sogang University	Han Mannyeon (한만년)	–	Lee Jucheon (이주천); KAIST	Kim Hyangsu (김향수); Anam Group	–
1994	Kim Aema (김애마); Ewha Womans University	–	Choi Il-nam (최일남)	Lee Giyeong (이기영); Dongguk University	–	Underwood family
1995	Im Seokjae (임석재); Seoul National University	–	Pi Chun-deuk (피천득)	Yoon Nung-min (윤능민); Sogang University	Kim Jaecheol (김재철); Dongwon Industries	–
1996	Kim Dongguk (김동국); Subong Rehabilitation Center	–	Kim Jong-gil (김종길)	Bak Songbae (박송배); KAIST	Huh Chin-kyu (허진규); Iljin Group	Kang Seongsuk (강성숙)
1997	Hyun Soong-jong (현승종); Konkuk University	–	–	Jo Gijun (조기준); Korea University	Lee Yongtae (이용태); TriGem	–
1998	–	–	Kim Chunsu (김춘수)	–	–	Won Gyeongseon (원경선); Pulmuone
1999	Kim Jongcheol (김종철)	–	–	Lee Sangsu (이상수)	–	–
2000	–	Kim Seongjae (김성재); Iljisa	Park Wan-suh (박완서)	–	Ahn Cheol-soo (안철수)	Jo Ara (조아라); YWCA
2001	Eom Gyubaek (엄규백); Yangchung High School	–	–	Lee Hyeoncheol (이현철)	Kang Myeongsun (강명순); Hanyang University	–
2002	–	–	Yu Jongho (유종호); Yonsei University	–	Yun Jongyong (윤종용); Samsung Electronics	Jeon Bongyun (전봉윤); Down Center
2003	Jeong Beommo (정범모); Hallym University	Bak Maengho (박맹호); Minumsa Temple	Yi Cheong-jun (이청준)	Bak Jonghyeon (박종현); Sungkyunkwan University	–	–

Year	Education	Publishing	Industrial Technology	Humanities and Social Sciences	Natural Science	Public Service
2004	Jeong Uisuk (정의숙); Ewha Haktang	–	Kim Ssangsu (김쌍수); LG Electronics	Kim Chungryeol (김충렬); Korea University	Ihm Jisoon (임지순); Seoul National University	Han Myeongja (한명자); Geumgwan Health Clinic
2005	–	Kwanhun Club (관훈클럽)	Chung Mong-koo (정몽구); Hyundai Motor Group	Kim Uchang (김우창); Korea University	Hwang Woo-suk (황우석); Seoul National University	
2006	Jo Wangyu (조완규); Ministry of Education	Lee Giung (이기웅); Yeolhwadang Book Publishing	Lee Gutaek (이구택); POSCO	Park Ynhui (박이문); Yonsei University	Jang Jin (장진); Kyung Hee University	Kim Jongtae (김종태); Peace Village
2007	–	Nam Siuk (남시욱); Sejong University	Heo Dongsu (허동수); GS Caltex	Ko Beomseo (고범서); Hallym University	Kang Seokjung (강석중); KAIST	Jang Sunmyeong (장순명); Miryang Yeongnam Hospital
2008	Suh Nam-pyo (서남표); KAIST	Jeong Jinseok (정진석); Hankuk University of Foreign Studies	Heo Yeongseop (허영섭); Green Cross	Cha Hasun (차하순); Sogang University	Kuk Young (국양); Seoul National University	–
2009	Lee Wonhui (이원희); Daewon Academy	–	Choe Gilseon (최길선); HD Hyundai Heavy Industries	Kim Hwayeong (김화영); Korea University	Hwang Inhwan (황인환); Pohang University of Science and Technology	Fountain House (태화 샘솟는 집)
2010	–	Lee Myeongdong (이명동); The Dong-a Ilbo	Kim Jeongsik (김정식); DaeDuck Electronics	–	Cheon Jinwoo (천진우); Yonsei University	Kim Cheonju (김천주); Korean Woman's Federation for Consumer
2011	Seoul Girls' Commercial High School (서울여자상고)	–	Jeong Beomsik (정범식); Lotte Chemical	Kim Joo-young (김주영)	Kang Hyeonbae (강현배); Inha University	Kim Seongsu (김성수); Purme Foundation (푸르메재단)
2012	Seoul Science High School (서울과학고등학교)	–	Kwon Oh-hyun (권오현); Samsung Electronics	Im Hyeongtaek (임형택); Sungkyunkwan University	Kim Eunjoon (김은준); KAIST	Lee Gilyeo (이길여); Gacheon Gil Foundation
2013	Seoul Institute of the Arts (서울예술대학교)	–	–	Han Sangbok (한상복); Seoul National University	Jo Jaepil (조재필); Ulsan National Institute of Science and Technology	–

Year	Education	Media and culture	Humanities and society	Science and technology	Special Prize
2014	Ahn Byeongyeong (안병영)	Korean Language Society (한글 학회)	Kim Gyeongdong (김경동); KAIST	Yu Jinnyeong (유진녕); LG Electronics	–
2015	Ryu Gyeonghui (류경희); Salesio Girls' High School (살레시오여자고등학교)	Han Jongu (한종우); Gwangseonggok Press and Culture Foundation (성곡언론문화재단)	Kim Hakju (김학주); Seoul National University	Seo Yeongjun (서영준); Seoul National University 이용훈; Inchon Foundation 성낙인; Seoul National University	–
2016	Hong Seongdae (홍성대); Sangsan Academy	Kim Byeongik (김병익)	Baek Wangi (백완기); Korea University	Yeom Han-woong (염한웅); Pohang University of Science and Technology	–
2017	Kim Hyeongseok (김형석); Yonsei University	Kang Hyo (강효); Juilliard School	Lee Sangseop (이상섭); Yonsei University	Kim Jongseung (김종승); Korea University	–
2018	Kim Jonggi (김종기); Blue Tree Cheongyedan	Han Taesuk (한태숙)	Lee Jeongsik (이정식); University of Pennsylvania	Hwang Cheolseong (황철성); Seoul National University	–
2019	Lee Donhui (이돈희); Seoul National University	Han Gang (한강)	Kim Hodong (김호동); Seoul National University	Bak Byeonguk (박병욱); Seoul National University	–
2020	Handong Global University (한동대학교)	Bong Joon-ho (봉준호)	–	Cha Gukheon (차국헌); Seoul National University	–
2021	Ajou Motor College (아주자동차대학교)	Bak Seeun (박세은)	Lee Jonghwa (이종화); Korea University	Seon Yangguk (선양국); Hanyang University	–
2022	Korean Minjok Leadership Academy (민족사관고등학교)	Lee Suji (이수지)	Kim Inhwan (김인환); Korea University	Kwon Sung-Hoon (권성훈); Seoul National University	Korea Aerospace Research Institute; Korean Launch Vehicle Development Division
2023	Lee Daebong (이대봉); Seoul Arts Academy and Chambit Group	Kim Jonggyu (김종규)	–	Choe Sunwon (최순원); Massachusetts Institute of Technology	–
2024	Hong Jeong-gil (홍정길); Wheat Welfare Foundation and Namseoul Eunhye Church	Park Jeong-ja (박정자)	Ahn Daehoe (안대회)	Kwon In-so (권인소); KAIST	–
2025	Haemill School (해밀학교)	Shin Dal-ja (신달자)	Kim Byeong-yeon (김병연); Seoul National University	Kim Beom-jun (김범준); POSTECH	–

== See also ==
- Kyung-Ahm Prize
- Korea Science Award
