= Kim Su-jin =

Kim Su-jin or Kim Soo-jin may refer to:

- Kim Soo-jin (actress) (born 1974), South Korean actress
- Kim Soo-jin (mineralogist) (1939–2025), South Korean mineralogist and professor
- Kim Su-jin (curler) (born 1999), South Korean curler
- Kim Su-jin (swimmer) (born 1974), South Korean swimmer
