= Seong Changyeong =

South Korean poet (born 1930)

- Born: March 21, 1930; Yesan County, Chūseinan Province, Korea, Empire of Japan
- Died: February 26, 2013 (aged 82)
- Writing career
- Language: Korean

Korean name
- Hangul: 성찬경
- Hanja: 成贊慶
- RR: Seong Changyeong
- MR: Sŏng Ch'an'gyŏng

Seong Changyeong (Korean: 성찬경, 1930–2013) was a modern South Korean poet.

== Biography ==
Seong Changyeong was born on March 1, 1930 in Yesan County, Chūseinan Province, Korea, Empire of Japan. He attended Seoul National University where he earned a B.A. in English. He worked as a member of the 1960s literary club Sahwajip (along with Pak Hui-jin, Pak Jaesam, Pak Seongryong, Yi Seonggyo, Yi Changdae, and Kang Wiseok,) and the poetry reading club Kionggan. Seong worked as a professor of English at Sungkyunkwan University.

Seong died on February 26, 2013.

== Career ==
Seong Changyeong debuted with the poem "Miyeol" in the literary magazine Arts and Literature (Munhak yesul) in 1956, going on to publish "Amudo nareul", "Monologue of Da Vinci" (Davinchiui dokbaek) and "Midwife Grandmother" (Samsin Halmeoni). Seong's first collection of poetry was titled A Fugue for Burning (Hwahyeong dunjugok, 1966); he also published Ode to Insects (Beollesorisong, 1970), Song for Time (Siganeum, 1982), The Eyes of the Soul and the Eyes of the Body (Yeonghonui Nun Yukcheui Nun, 1986), The Enchanted Green (Hwangholhan Cholokbitt, 1989), and A Tribute to the Pine Tree (Sonamureul Girim, 1991).

Of Seong Changyeong's poetry, the Korea Literature Translation Institute writes:

Sung Chan-gyeong is a modernist poet in the truest sense of the word. A master of metaphor, his poems are full of modernist experimentation in both technical form and content. His influences are generally understood to include the British romanticist poet D.M. Thomas as well as the poets of metaphysical school.

Sung's poems, generally involving abstract themes and ideas like much Korean poetry from the 50s an 60s, heavily employ the tool of the metaphor. In his famous poem "The Screw Bolt" (Nasa), the poet, according to one critic, employs the stray screw bolt as a metaphor for a lost soul, or a relic of civilization which, like a 'word out of context', must be reconciled with some sort of an organic order. These metaphors, so crucial to Sung's poetry, go beyond the standard of a way of comparison, and comprise his fundamental orientation, as is expressed in his poem "I Love Metaphors" (Eunyureul saranghanda).

Because of just this writing style, in addition to the rapid progress and buildup of language and the use of largely unfamiliar images, Sung's poetry is often considered to be difficult to understand. However, Sung's unique expression of language is not in the least impossible to appreciate and does not necessarily have to be avoided: his bold use of scientific terms such as 'ion', 'electronics', 'aurora', etc. and his use of old Korean, English words, and Korean-Chinese hybrid words can be quite surprising and intriguing, and, above all, guarantees complete originality.

Seong's best-known work in Korean is a series of poems entitled The Screw Bolt, in which he tried to find nature in the artifacts of civilization.

== Works ==
=== Translations ===
- Translucency: Selected Poems of Changkyung Sung. Translated by Won-Chung Kim and Christopher Merrill. Homa & Sekey Books, 2010.

=== Works in Korean (partial) ===
==== Poetry collections ====
- A Fugue for Burning (Hwahyeong dunjugok, 1966)
- Ode to Insects (Beollesorisong, 1970)
- Song for Time (Siganeum, 1982)
- The Eyes of the Soul and the Eyes of the Body (Yeonghonui Nun Yukcheui Nun, 1986)
- The Enchanted Green (Hwangholhan Cholokbitt, 1989)
- A Tribute to the Pine Tree (Sonamureul Girim)

== Awards ==
- 1st 'Korean Poets Association Awards' - for "The Screw Bolt" (Nasa) in 1979
- 5th 'Contemporary Poetics Awards' - for "Half-Translucent" (Ban Tumyeong) in 1985
- 2nd 'Literature of Light and Save' in 1991
