= National Academy of Sciences of the Republic of Korea =

South Korean academic organization

- Established: 17 July 1954; 71 years ago
- Location: Banpo-daero 37-gil 59, Seoul, South Korea
- Coordinates: 37°29′44″N 127°00′09″E
- Affiliations: International Council for Science
- Staff: 150
- Website: www.nas.go.kr

- National Academy of Sciences of the Republic of Korea
- Hangul: 대한민국학술원
- Hanja: 大韓民國學術院
- RR: Daehanminguk haksurwon
- MR: Taehanmin'guk haksurwŏn

The National Academy of Sciences of the Republic of Korea (Korean: 대한민국학술원), is the senior national organization of distinguished South Korean scientists and scholars. It was founded to promote learning and research in all areas of sciences by conferring membership and preferential treatment to those who have made outstanding contributions to the advancement of sciences and learning. The Academy consists of 150 Fellows who are selected by their peers for their contributions to the sciences and education.

== Overview ==
The National Academy of Sciences was inaugurated on July 17, 1954, and entrusted with the duty of promoting the development of sciences, and of facilitating the development of national culture. Founded on the legal basis of Culture Protection Act promulgated on August 7, 1952, the National Academy of Sciences initially comprised 50 members.

On March 25, 1954, fifty members were selected from around the nation : twenty-five from the humanities and social sciences, and twenty-five from the natural sciences. Thirty-four years later, on December 31, 1988, the Culture Protection Act of 1952 was replaced by the National Academy of Sciences of the Republic of Korea Act. The ceiling of membership is 150. The present Academy members total 134 as of June 2006. These include 62 in the Humanities and Social Science Division and 72 in the Natural Science Division. The members are assigned to 11 sections.

=== Functions ===
The specific functions of the National Academy of Sciences include:

- Consultation and proposals on national policies related to the promotion of science
- Scientific research and support thereof
- Domestic and international academic exchanges and organizing academic events
- Presentation of the National Academy of Science Awards
- Other matters concerning the promotion of the sciences

== Members ==
=== Philosophy, ethics, logic, aesthetics, religion, pedagogy and psychology ===
- Lew Seung-kook (Eastern Philosophy)
- Kim Kyu-young (Western Philosophy)
- Kim Tae-kil (Ethics)
- Chung Bom-mo (Pedagogy)
- Cho Tae-kyung (Psychology)
- Park Young-sik (Analytic Philosophy)
- Chung Chin-hong (Phenomenology of Religion)
- Cha Jae-ho (Psychology)
- Zoh Myeong-han (Cognitive Psychology)
- Oh Byung-nam (Aesthetics)
- Lee Don-hee (Philosophy of Education)
- Lee sung-jin (Educational Psychology)

=== Language and literature ===
- Yoh Suk-kee (English Literature)
- Cho Sung-shik (English Linguistics)
- Kang Tou-shik (German Literature)
- Jung Myong-hwan (French Literature)
- Ki-Moon Lee (Korean Linguistics)
- Kim Wan-jin (Korean Linguistics)
- Chang Suk-jin (Linguistics)
- Kim Hyun-chang (Spanish Literature)
- Kim Yong-jik (Korean Modern Literature)
- Lee Kyong-shik ( English Literature)
- Cho Dong-il (Korean Classical Literature)
- Hong Chai-song (French Linguistics)

=== History, geography, archaeology, cultural anthropology and folklore ===
- Chun Hae-jong (East Asian History)
- Lee Du-hyun (Korean Folklore and Cultural Anthropology)
- Youn Moo-byong (Archaeology)
- Lee Woo-sung (Korean History)
- Hwang Su-uoung (Art History)
- Kim Yong-sup (Korean History)
- Cha Ha-soon (Western History)
- Lee Song-mu (Korean History, Choson Period)
- Lee Ki-suk (Human Geography)
- Lee Ki-dong (Korean History)
- Kim Young-han (European History)
- Lee Sung-kyu (Oriental History)
- Yi Tae-jin (Korean History)

=== Law ===
- Lee Hang-nyong (Law)
- Nam Heung-woo (Criminal Law & Criminology)
- Kim Jhong-won (Criminal Law)
- Kim Chung-kyun (International Law)
- Kim Tschol-su (Constitutional Law)
- Huang Seok-in (Economic Law & Civil Law)
- Koh Sang-ryong (Civil Law)
- Kim Nam-jin (Public Administrative Law)
- Chung Dong-yoon (Commercial Law – Corporations & Civil Procedure)
- Park Byoung-ho (Korean Legal History & Family Law)

=== Political science, public administration, and sociology ===
- Lee Man-gap (Sociology)
- Hong Sung-chick (Sociology)
- Cha Ki-pyok (Comparative Politics)
- Lim Hy-sop (Sociology)
- Kang Sin-taek (Public Administration : Public Budgeting)
- Ahn Byung-joon (Political Science & International Reiations)
- Kim Kyong-dong (Sociology)
- Kim Yong-koo (International Relations)
- Jin Duk-gyu (Politics)
- Paik Wan-ki (Public Administration)
- Lee jung-bock (Contemporary Korean Politics)
- Kim Hong-woo (political thought)

=== Economics and business administration ===
- Choi Ho-chin (Economics)
- Lee Hyun-jae (Economics)
- Cho Soon (Economics)
- Byun Hyung-yoon (Economics)
- Kim Dong-ki (Business Administration (Marketing))
- Park Kwang-soon (Economics)
- Yoon Ki-jung (Economics)
- Kwak Soo-il (Business Administration)
- Jeong Ki-jun (Economics)
- Kim Kee-young (Business Administration)
- Yoo Jang-hee (Economics)

=== Mathematics, physics, chemistry, astronomy and meteorology ===
- Chang Sei-hun (Chemistry)
- Lee Sang-soo (Physics: Lasers and Optics)
- Shim Jyong-sup (Polymer Chemistry)
- Yoon Se-won (Physics)
- Park Tai-won (Applied Chemistry)
- Yoon Kap-byung (Mathematics)
- Ahn Se-hee (Nuclear Physics)
- Rho Chae-shik (Micrometeorology / Pollution Climatology)
- Koh Yoon-suk (Physics, Theoretical Nuclear)
- Park Se-hie (Mathematics)
- Kwun Sook-il (Physics)
- Ki U-hang (Mathematics)
- Yoon Nung-min (Chemistry)
- Lee Ik-choon (Chemistry, Physical Chemistry)
- Kim Yong-hae (Organic Chemistry)

=== Biology, geology, physical education, nutrition, and home economics ===
- Cheong Chang-hi (Geology Stratigraphy)
- Kim Choon-min (Plant Ecology)
- Kim Chang-whan (Entomology, Developmental Biology)
- Ju Jin-soon (Nutrition)
- Lee Sang-man (Petrology)
- Kim Hoon-soo (Animal Taxonomy)
- Lee Yung-nok (Molecular Biology)
- Kim Soo-jin (Geology (Mineralogy))
- Kim Joon-ho (Botany)
- Lee Jeong-woo (Home Economics)
- Ha Doo-bong (Biology)
- Park Sang-dai (Cellular & Molecular Genetics)
- Park Hi-in (Geology)
- Maeng Won-jai (Nutrition)
- Lim Burn-jang (Sport Sociology)

=== Architecture, mechanical engineering, mining engineering, electrical engineering, electronics, naval architecture, civil engineering ===
- Hahn Song-yop (Electrical Engineering)
- Kang Myung-soon (Mechanical Engineering)
- Yoon Chang-sup (Architecture)
- Rhee Sung-won (Electrical Engineering)
- Woo Hyung-ju (Electrical Engineering)
- Kim Sang-joo (Metallurgical Engineering)
- Hwang Jong-heul (Naval Architecture)
- Park Chung-hyun (Civil Engineering)
- Rhee Man-young (Electronic Communication Engineering)
- Cho Sun-whi (Mechanical Engineering)
- Kim Sang-yong (Fiber Physics: Textile Engineering)
- Rho Oh-hyun (Aerospace Engineering)
- Lee Choong-woong (Electronic Engineering)
- Yoon Duk-yong (Metallurgy and Materials Science)
- Hyun Byung-koo (Mineral and Petroleum Engineering – Geophysical Engineering))
- Ra Jung-woong (Electronic Engineering)

=== Medicine, dentistry, veterinary medicine and pharmacy ===
- Woo Lin-keun (Natural Products Chemistry)
- Lee Ho-wang (Microbiology)
- Kwon E-hyock (Preventive Medicine)
- Lee Sang-sup (Pharmaceutical Biochemistry)
- Lee Jang-nag (Veterinary Pharmacology)
- Moon Gook-jin (Legal Medicine)
- Kim Ju-whan (Dentistry)
- Kim Yong-il (Pathology)
- Kim Nak-doo (Pharmacology)
- Kim Byung-soo (Medicine: Oncology)
- Lee Soon-hyung (Medical Parasitology)
- Kim Young-joong (Pharmacology)
- Kim Chung-yong (Internal Medical)
- Ko Jea-seung (Dentistry: Oral Histology and Developmental Biology)

=== Agriculture, forestry, animal science, and fisheries ===
- Shim Chong-supp (Wood Science)
- Lee Chun-yung (Agricultural Chemistry)
- Cho Jae-yeung (Agronomy Science)
- Lee Eun-woong (Crop Science)
- Ohh Bong-kug (Animal Science)
- Kim Moon-hyup (Sericultural Science)
- Koh Chae-koon (Agricultural Civil Engineering)
- Choi Byong-hee (Silk Engineering)
- Hong Sung-gak (Forestry)
- Chun Seh-kyu (Fish Pathology)
- Lee Byung-yil (Horticultural Science)
- Kim Hyun-uk (Animal Products and Technology)
- Hwang Byung-kook (Plant Pathology)
- Yoo Sun-ho (Soil Physics)

== National Academy of Sciences Award ==
The National Academy of Sciences Award is an award presented to South Korean nationals who have made significant contributions to academic development through intensive research on a specific topic. Prize money of KRW 100 million is given in addition to the award. The award is given by the National Academy of Sciences of the Republic of Korea in accordance with Article 14 of the National Academy of Sciences of the Republic of Korea Act and Article 4 of the Academic Academy Prize Award Regulations (학술원상시상규정). The first awards were given in 1955.
