= Huh Chin-kyu =

South Korean businessman (born 1940)

- 허진규
- Born: 1 December 1940 (age 85); Buan, Zenranan-dō, Korea, Empire of Japan
- Education: Seoul National University
- Occupation: Businessman
- Known for: Founder and chairman, ILJIN Group
- Children: 2

- Huh Chin-kyu
- Hangul: 허진규
- Hanja: 許鎭奎
- RR: Heo Jingyu
- MR: Hŏ Chin'gyu

Huh Chin-kyu (Korean: 허진규; Hanja: 許鎭奎; born December 1, 1940) is a billionaire South Korean businessman, and the founder and chairman of ILJIN Group.

== Early life ==
Huh was born on December 1, 1940, in Buan, Zenrahoku-dō, Korea, Empire of Japan. He earned a bachelor's degree in material sciences and engineering from Seoul National University.

== Career ==
Huh founded ILJIN Electricity Industry Inc. in 1967.

In July 2018, his net worth was estimated at US$1.1 billion.

Huh is the vice chairman of the Korea International Trade Association. He has an honorary doctorate from Cheon-Book University.

== Personal life ==
His eldest son Huh Jung-suk joined Iljin Group in 2002 as a director and became the president and CEO of Iljin Holdings in 2007, and is the co-CEO of Iljin Electric. His second-eldest son, Huh Jae-myung, is president and CEO of Iljin Copper Foil.

== Awards ==
- 1996: Inchon Award
