= Ha Seung-moo =

South Korean theologian (born 1963)

Ha Seung-moo 하승무
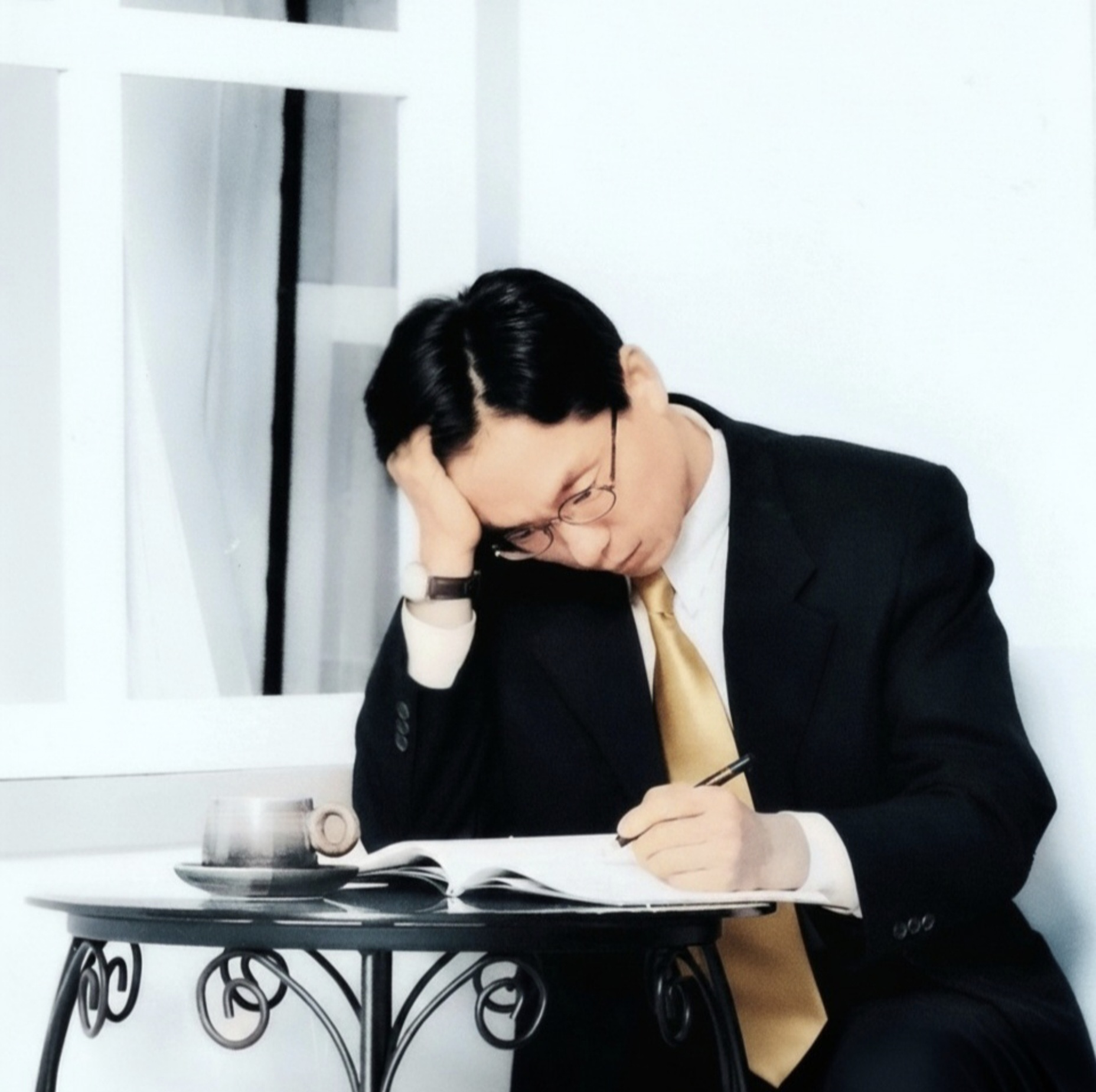
- Born: October 13, 1963 (age 63); Sacheon, South Korea
- Education: Catholic University of Daegu
- Occupations: Professor of historical theology, author, poet
- Writing career
- Language: Korean
- Period: 1991-present
- Notable awards: Pride Korea Awards 2020; The 34th Busan Metropolitan City Citizen Award(2018), 2018 National Theologian Award, others
- Movements: Christian poetry, South Korean literature

- Ha Seung-moo
- Hangul: 하승무
- Hanja: 河承武
- RR: Ha Seungmu
- MR: Ha Sŭngmu

Art name
- Hangul: 시학재, 란사
- Hanja: 詩學齋, 蘭史
- RR: Sihakjae, Ransa
- MR: Sihakchae, Ransa

Courtesy name
- Hangul: 창호, 창우
- Hanja: 昌浩, 昌優
- RR: Changho, Changu
- MR: Ch'angho, Ch'angu

Ha Seung-moo (born October 13, 1963; also spelled Ha Seung moo) is a South Korean poet, Presbyterian minister, seminary professor, and theologian.

== Early life ==
Ha was born on October 13, 1963, in Sacheon, South Korea. Ha is the grandson of Sir Ha Yeon, who is the twenty-first grandson of Joseon's most notable Yŏngŭijŏng (prime minister).

After his basic education, Ha began to read modern literature. He was motivated by a bookseller who visited the school and purchased a series of books on modern Korean literature. Thereafter, readings of Korean literature sparked his interest in writing and philosophy. In this process, Ha began to question humanity and thing-in-itself. During the high school years, Ha's spiritual journey continued. He pursued truth, the meaning of life and humanity in Buddhism, Hinduism and other major religions. In this spiritual journey, he read many western philosophical classics.

Ha was influenced by the works of Sigmund Freud, Carl Gustav Jung, Immanuel Kant and Søren Kierkegaard. Ha experienced spiritual progression recognizing the importance and meaning of human existence, and the 'despair' of Kierkegaard and the 'reason' of Kant became a less serious issue to his life and study. At the end of 12th grade, Ha had a mystical religious experience that made him confess that God is the only answer to his quest for meaning. Ha then became a Christian.

His poetry became an artistic stimulus for artists in parts of England and America.

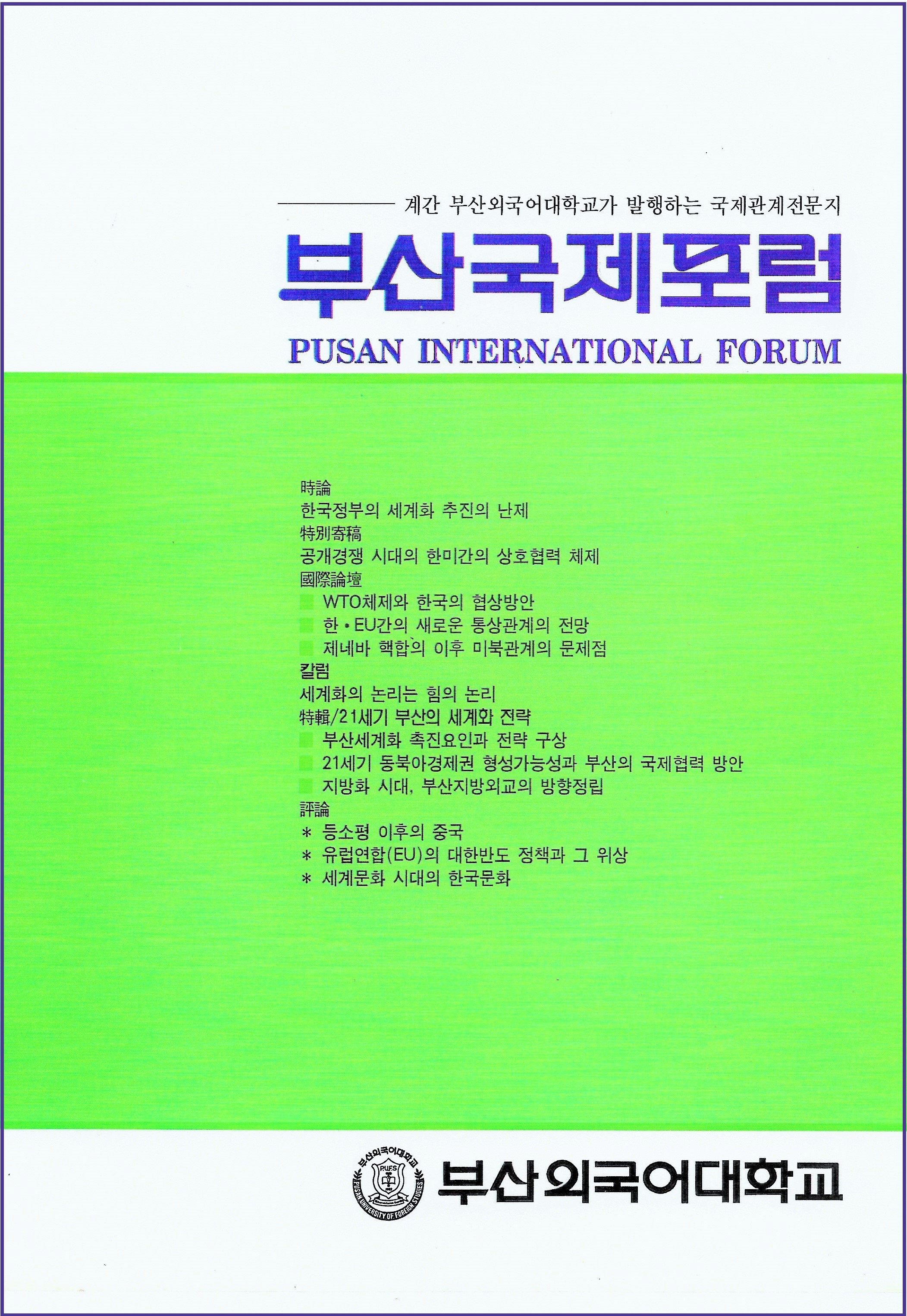
PIF Chief Editor's Ha Seung Moo

== Career ==
Ha became a Presbyterian minister and a professor of historical theology at Korea Presbyterian Theological Seminary. He teaches Biblical Exposition. Ha established Korea Presbyterian Church and the Korea Presbyterian Seminary, serving as Pastoral General, Christian education, Missions etc., at his own expense. Ha presented the historical point of view of the Original orthodox Church, describing how the confession of faith and the historical context coincide. Ha is a poet, and a reformist theologian. He debuted as a poet by the recommendation of fellow poet Park Jaesam and two others in Hankyoreh Literature Magazine in 1994.

- 5th Secretary General, The World Association of Korean Writers(2024~)
- Chief Ed officer, Korea Creative Writing Education Institute(2024~)
- President of Korea Headquarters, International Union of Reformed Churches (2024~)
- 4th Secretary General, The World Association of Korean Writers(2024~)
- Chief Ed officer, Korea Creative Writing Education Institute(2024~)
- President of Korea Headquarters, International Union of Reformed Churches (2024~)
- 4th President, Korea Presbyterian Theological Seminary (2024~)
- President, Busan Social Information Forum (BSIF)(NPO, 2003~)
- Catholic University of Daegu Graduate School, Department of History Lecturer (2021-2024.3)
- President, Busan Christian Writers Association (BCWA)(2013~)
- Research Committee Member of the World Association of Korean Writers(2008~ )
- President & Moderator(1st, 2nd), General Assembly of the Korea Presbyterian Theological Seminary (2014-2017)
- Professor of Historical Theology, Korea Presbyterian Theological Seminary(2012~)
- First President, Korea Presbyterian Theological Seminary (2012-2015)
- Council Member of National Unification Advisory Council (2003-2007)
- Expert Member(Unification Education) of Ministry of Unification (2004-2005)
- CG & Chief Executive of Hyundai PR Research Center (2004-2006)
- CG & Chief Executive of Korea IT Cultural Content Research Institute (2003-2004)
- First Vice Chairman, Korea Universities PR Association (1997)
- Chief Editor, Pusan International Forum (Quarterly Academic journal, 1994–1997)

== Literary career ==
Ha began to write poems in Han-Kyoreh Literature (한겨레문학). His poem "Recollections of Homo Sapiens" (호모사피엔스의 기억) introduced him to the public. Ha's work faced difficulties, because it conflicted with traditional Korean literature. Nonetheless, Korean writers and poets generally admired his poetic work.

=== Poetry ===
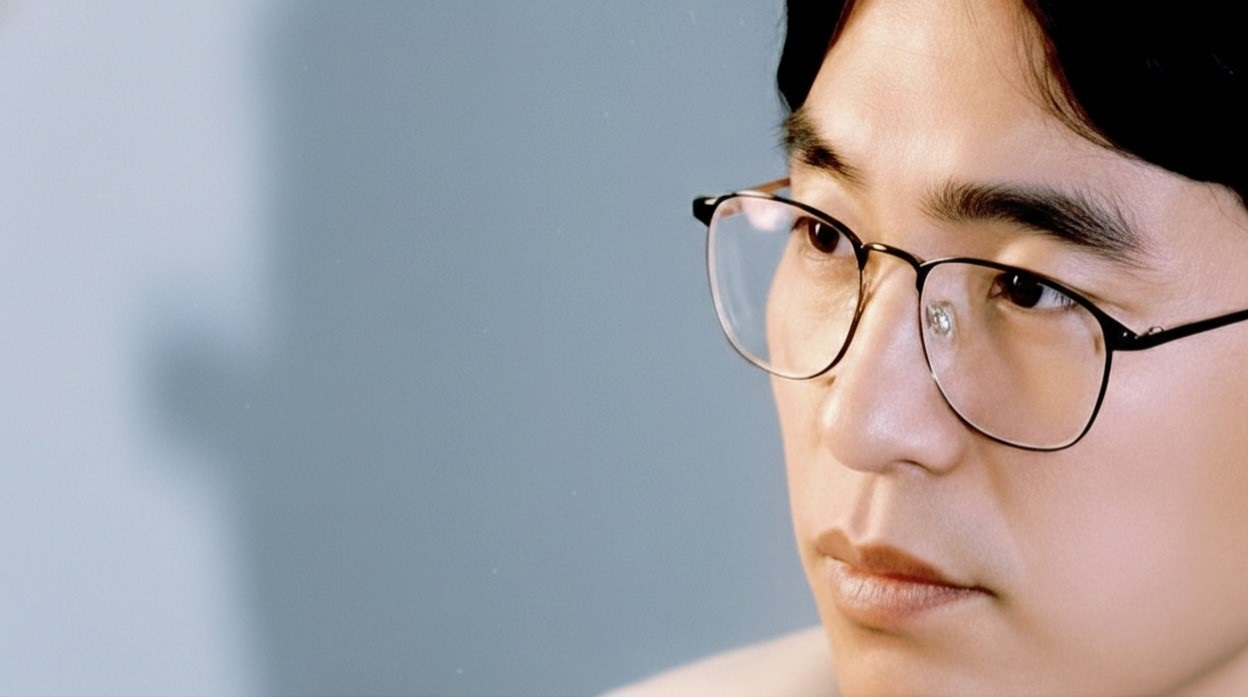
S.M.HA in his 30s

Park Jaesam is a representative of Korea-specific mentality. He evaluated Ha in the examination Review. He found that while Ha's poetry has a deep inner world, life and death, reality and ideal, metaphysics and metaphysics, and self-determination are dominant. He stated, "Super aesthetic psalm is a manifestation of his poems, and a critical approach is difficult if you do not understand the symbolism of religion and aesthetics to interpret such works." Prof. Kyung-Soo Yoon, among the critics of Ha's poetry, the peculiar one is deepening the symbolic systems of the surreal tendency of Yi Sang (Kim Hae-Kyung) poet, His unique poetical style is considered to be reasonable to see in terms of the mystical experiences and spiritual aspirations that have returned to Christianity. Since 1994, he announced at the time, such as newspapers, magazines, etc. and has become rather widely known to the general reader rather than a literary background. In particular, while a Christian, religion without being bound to the Christian poetry style, semiotics, and embody the poetic image to deepen the symbolic system of aesthetics. His poems "The sixth tailbone of the Cenozoic era", "The perspiration from the sun comes out" have appeared well. In the 2000s after is, the poem "Songs of Wildflowers" depicting the lyricism by intuition and There is a "The story of an elephant's hand expelled by the sky", which can be said to be poetry that first introduced allegorical techniques to the work of poetry. Other common collaborative poetry books are "There is no way to nostalgia" (Bichnam, 1996), "The Southern Poetry" (Busan Poets' Association, 1999), "Flowers bloom, On the bluestem" (Jaggadeul, 2006), "Seihangobi. (Jaggadeul, 2008), "Forest of Sosa Tree" (Jaggadeul, 2011), "My poetry I choose" (Chaegmandeuneun Jib, 2012). In recent years, Byeon Uisu literary critic wrote Ha Seungmoo's poetry world, and in his special review commented on poetic excellence:

Immanuel Kant thought that he gained knowledge based on time and space. and Albert Einstein thought that there would be no time beyond the speed of light. of course, "time" of Kant is psychological, and Einstein's "time" is relative. but, in the strict sense that time does not exist as an objective entity, is Kant or Einstein's proposition ultimately an imperfect wisdom of "99.9%" rather than "100%"? Ha Seung-moo evokes the problem of the essentially axioms of the 'Sophist type' of language. The river of time never flows, says time exists. The wisdom of the human writes the "Critique of Pure Reason", however, discuss the conversion of time and space. But poet say that people don't spend the time they think they do. These views of the Ha poet are extraordinary.

== Poet. Ha Seung-moo's literary thought ==
Ha Seung-moo's literary thought is shaped by his unique background as a poet, a theologian, and a student of Eastern and Western philosophy. His writing, especially his poetry, is deeply spiritual and philosophical, exploring themes of human existence, spiritual journey, and the limits of human knowledge. Critics note that his work can be considered "extraordinary" and in conflict with some aspects of traditional Korean literature.

=== Philosophical and spiritual foundations ===
Ha's literary thought emerged from a deep personal and spiritual quest for the meaning of human existence, which he pursued through his study of literature, philosophy, and religion. A search for meaning: After reading modern Korean literature, Ha developed an interest in writing and philosophy and began questioning humanity and the "thing-in-itself" (the true nature of an object, independent of human perception). Influence of Western philosophy: During high school, he read the works of Western philosophers, including Sigmund Freud, Carl Gustav Jung, Immanuel Kant, and Søren Kierkegaard. Integration of Eastern and Western thought: He also explored major Eastern religions such as Buddhism and Hinduism. Ultimately, Ha's quest for meaning was resolved in his Christian faith, which became the central influence on his literary and theological worldview.

=== The limitations of human reason ===
A key aspect of Ha's literary thought is his skepticism regarding humanistic knowledge, reason, and language. The flawed nature of language: According to critic Byeon Uisu, Ha's poetry "evokes the problem of the essentially axioms of the 'Sophist type' of language". Ha challenges the notion that language can fully capture reality. Questioning philosophical wisdom: Byeon points to the limitations of human wisdom, contrasting the philosophical and scientific understanding of time. He cites Kant's psychological time and Einstein's relative time, suggesting that both are imperfect because time, strictly speaking, does not exist as an objective entity. Challenging perception: Ha's work suggests that people are mistaken about their perception of time, exemplified by the line, "The river of time never flows, says time exists".

=== Literature as a spiritual and poetic tool ===
For Ha Seung-moo, literature is not merely a human endeavor but a way to reveal profound spiritual truths. Revelation over humanism: While his work can be admired from a purely literary perspective, his underlying theological thought, the "Orthodox-faith View of Church History," is founded on biblical teachings and a salvific confession of faith. This suggests his writing seeks to express and explore spiritual truths rather than arriving at conclusions through humanistic reasoning alone. Poetry as a divine answer: Ha's literary trajectory suggests his poetry became a form of artistic expression for his conviction that "God is the only answer to his quest for meaning". His poem "Recollections of Homo Sapiens" is a key example of his work that introduced this perspective. Conflict with literary tradition: Because of its deep spiritual and philosophical core, Ha's literary work initially faced difficulties and conflicted with aspects of traditional Korean literature.

== Ha Seung-moo's theological thought ==
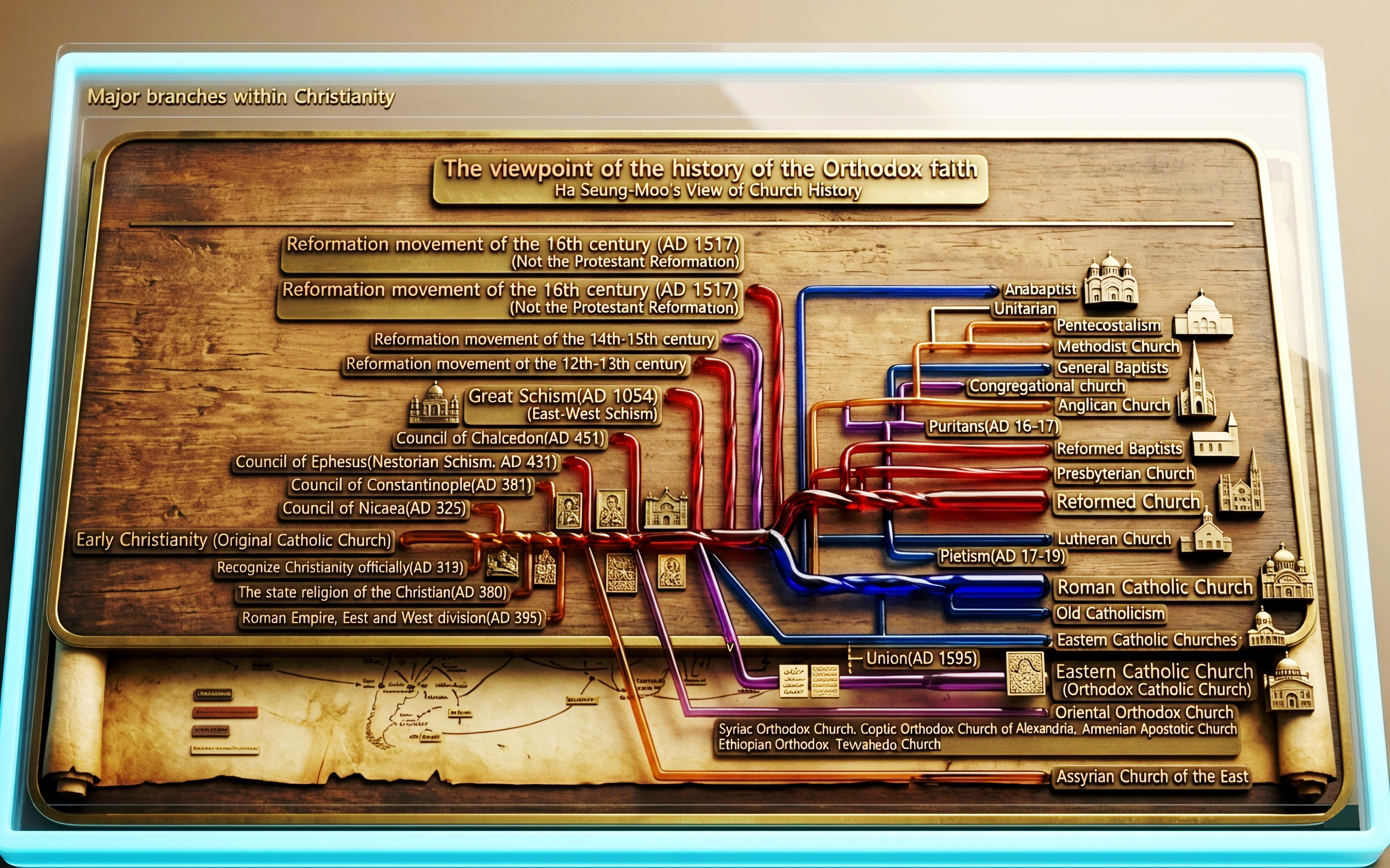
Non-denominational genealogy

Prof. Ha Seung-moo developed the Orthodox-faith View of Church History, a methodology for interpreting Christianity based on the salvific faith of the early church rather than humanistic approaches. As a Presbyterian minister and professor, he posits that all historical church developments and denominational divisions must be judged by their alignment with biblical authority and the original orthodox confession of faith.

=== Core principles of his view ===
Prof. Ha Seung-moo view is founded on biblical teachings and the "salvific confession of faith" passed down from the early church. He rejects humanistic historiographical methods, including those used by Roman Catholics and some Protestants, in favor of a biblical foundation. His approach seeks to create a coherent historical narrative that connects the early church to the present and future. Ha asserts that traditional church organizations, doctrines, and historical traditions should not be the interpretive standard if they do not align with the early church's confession of faith. Redefining Christian denominations Ha's historiography re-evaluates how Christian denominations are understood within church history. He criticizes the term "Protestant" as a humanistic label that originated with the Roman Catholic Church and inappropriately groups the reformers with later denominations. He defines the true Orthodox Church or Reformed Church as one that adheres to the early church's confession and the spirit of the Reformation. In this view, Roman Catholicism is considered a branch of Christianity that has deviated from the true historical Catholic Church of the early era.

== Notable awards ==
- 2024 National Assembly of the Republic of Korea Chairman's Merit Medal(Social Contribution)
- Pride Korea Awards 2020(10th)
- Busan branch Citation of the Korea Military Merit Awardees Association(2020)
- The 34th Busan Metropolitan City Citizen Award(2018)
- 2018 National Theologian Award
- Military Manpower Administration Citation(2017)
- Ministry of Foreign Affairs Overseas Koreans Foundation Gold Award(2006)
- National Forum Union & 21 century Bundang Forum Achievement Award(2006)
- Busan University of Foreign Studies Graduate School of Education Achievement Award(1997)
- The 3rd Hankyore New Literary Prize(1994)
- Busan Korea's Christian Literary Society Best Work Award(1995)
- Army Dulumi Church' Merit Appreciation Plaque(in 133rd ADA Battn, 1987)
- Commander Award of the 1st ADA Bde(1986)
- Commander Award of the 1st ADA Bde(1985)
- BnCmd Award of the 1st ADA Bde 133rd ADA Battn.(1986)
- BnCmd Award of the 1st ADA Bde 133rd ADA Battn.(1985)
- Dongmyeong Technical High School Achievement Award (1984)

== Works ==
- The sixth tailbone of the Cenozoic era (신생대의 여섯 번째 꼬리뼈, 2024), Publisher: Karitas (ISBN 978-89-97087-87-7)
- The Southern Poetry (Nambu-eui si: Busan siin sagwajip, 남부의 시: 부산 시인 사화집, 1999). Publisher: Busan Poets' Association (1999)
- Guerrilla, Vol 3. Publisher: Yeni (1999)
- Guerrilla, Vol 4. Publisher: Yeni (1999)
- Australia Korean Literature (Hoju-Hanin Munhak, 호주한인문학). Publisher: The Association of Korean Writers in Australia (2002)
- Australia Korean Literature (Hoju-Hanin Munhak, 호주한인문학). Publisher: The Association of Korean Writers in Australia (2003)
- Flowers on the Blue Stem (Ggodi pinda pureun julgie, 꽃이 핀다 푸른 줄기에, 2006).
- Seihan Gobi (Seihan gobi, 세이한 고비, 2008). ISBN 978-89-957530-8-8
- Hornbeam Forest (Sosanamu sup, 소사나무 숲, 2011). ISBN 978-89-93433-09-8

== See also ==
- Historical theology
- William Blake
- Pak Jaesam

== Notes ==
- Who's Who in Korea (Hangugeul umjigineun inmuldeul, 한국을 움직이는 인물들, 2 vols). Publisher: Chungang Ilbosa(1995)
- Ha Seung Moo, Received "Proud Busan citizen prize" The Busan Ilbo(The Busan Daily News)
- International(Kookje) Poetry Poem 'Shooting Star'/ Ha Seung Moo The Kookje Daily News
- Poem and painting of our era Maeil Jong-gyo Shinmun(Daily religious newspaper).
- Bridgenews One's family with a story
- The Hankyoreh Newspaper Poet Ha Seung Moo, Received '2018 Korean Theological Education Award'
- The Kookje Daily News List of writers of declaration of the state of affairs
- Hankook Ilbo List of writers of declaration of the state of affairs
- Special Column "Today the political participation of Korean Christians ruins the state" Korea Journal. Maeil Jong-gyo Shinmun(Daily religious newspaper).
