= Pak Jaesam =

South Korean poet (1933–1997)

Park Jaesam
- Born: April 10, 1933; Japan
- Died: June 8, 1997 (aged 64)
- Writing career
- Language: Korean
- Period: 1955–1997

Korean name
- Hangul: 박재삼
- Hanja: 朴在森
- RR: Bak Jaesam
- MR: Pak Chaesam

Park Jaesam (Korean: 박재삼; April 10, 1933 – June 8, 1997) was a South Korean poet.

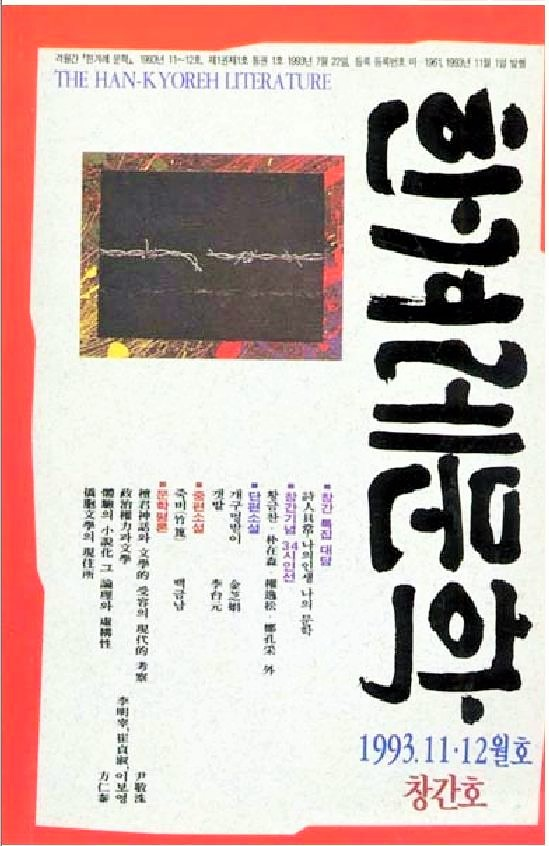
The Han Kyoreh Literature)

== Life ==
Park Jaesam was born on April 10, 1933, in Japan. Park attended Korea University, but dropped out. He worked as a reporter for the Daehan-Ilbo and an Editor of the Hyundai Munhak-sa. In the 1960s Park was a member of the literary club Sahwajip (along with Park Huijin, Sung Chan-gyeong, Park Seongryong, Lee Seonggyo, Lee Changdae and Kang Wiseok), and He served as the first editorial committee of the bimonthly publication "The Han Kyorerh Literature" newly launched in 1993. and the Secretary General of the Korean Poets' Association. Park died on June 8, 1997.

== Work ==
Park's first published poem was "In the Water of the River" (Gangmureseo), which was published in Contemporary Literature, at the recommendation of SEo Jeongju, in 1955. In the same year his sijo, "Providence" (Seomni), was published, with the recommendation of Yoo Chiwan, in Providence.

The Korean Literature Translation Institute summarizes Park's contribution to Korean literature:

Park Jaesam's poetry, in contrast to the sharp realist and modernist trends of the 1950s, expressed the eternal and delicate beauty of nature and the hidden dignity of humble human daily life through the medium of traditional Korean lyrics. However, his poetry was no mere re-creation of the old school of natural sentimentalism; though he utilized the classical techniques of sentiment and native sensibility, he was able to overcome the inconsistency of man with the eternity and beauty of nature by incorporating, rather than disparaging or rejecting, the pathos and nihilism of ordinary people as a fundamental part of the natural course of humanity. The pain of life, Park's poetry asserts, is not incompatible with its beauty or worth. His "Chunhyang's Mind" (Chunhyangi maeum) and "The Autumn River Glowing with Lamentation" (Ureumi taneun gaeul gang) best represent Park's body of work and his celebrated versification, which had finely nuanced yet uniquely colloquial tone that was particularly apt for his celebration of daily life. His lyrical compositions, even his early years of writing, is considered to be an expansion of traditional Korean poetry, an expansion that maintained its close affinity to the native understanding while reaching new planes of insight into the human psyche and man's relationship with the natural world.

== Works in Korean (Partial) ==
Collections

- In the Sunlight (Haetbit sogeseo), Millennial wind (Cheonnyeonui baram)
- Beside the little ones (Eolin geotdeul yeopeseo)
- In remembrance (Chueogeseo), Adeukhamyeon doerira
- My Love (Nae sarangeun)
- Near Daegwallyeong (Daegwallyeong geuncheo)
- Resplendent Unknown Factor (Challanhan mijisu)
- Doings of the stars above the sea (Bada wi byeoldeuri haneun jit)
- The Collected Works of Park Jaesam (Park Jaesam sijip), Love! (Sarangiyeo),
- The Autumn River Glowing with Lamentation (Ureumi taneun gaeul gang),

== Awards ==
- Contemporary Literature (Hyundae Munhak) Award
- New Faces Award from the Korean Poets Association (Hanguk siin hyeophoe)
- Nosan (Lee Eunsang) Literature Prize
- Korean Literature (Hanguk munhak) Writers Award
- Inchon Award

== See also ==
- Ha Seungmoo
