= Kim Uchang =

Korean writer (born 1937)

- Born: 17 December 1937
- Writing career
- Language: Korean

Korean name
- Hangul: 김우창
- Hanja: 金禹昌
- RR: Gim Uchang
- MR: Kim Uch'ang

Kim Uchang (Korean: 김우창, born 17 December 1937) is a South Korean literary critic and scholar of English literature. He is known for his arguments on building a rational society based on “aesthetic rationality” and moving beyond the dichotomy of conservatism and liberalism, modernism and post-modernism, nationalism and globalism, and literature as an ideology to empower the masses and literature as an art free of any political context.

== Life ==
Kim Uchang was born in Hampyeong County, South Korea in 1937. He graduated Seoul National University in 1958 with a degree in English literature, and earned his doctoral degree at Harvard University in 1975. He published his first critical essay "The Example of T. S. Eliot" in the magazine Cheongmaek (청맥) in 1965. He taught English literature at Seoul National University from 1963 to 1974 and at Korea University from 1974 to 2003. He holds an endowed chair at Ewha Womans University.

== Career ==
Kim Uchang’s criticism focuses on how people can reclaim their humanity in a modern capitalist society. He defines “modern era” as the age in which people lose their humanity and human rationality is suppressed, undermined, and turned into a tool, due to the separation of individual agency from the operation of society. According to Kim, quality literature can be produced when society and the individual, or universality and individuality, merges dialectically. He argues that literature can help overcome the divide or discord between society and the individual. He views literature as a bridge between the two that can restore humanity.

Kim thus judges a literary work based on how successfully it brings together society and the individual. He uses the concept “specific universality” as his judging criteria and argues that specific universality can be achieved through “aesthetic rationality.” According to the argument, the absence of rationality in South Korea’s modern history comes from an extreme dichotomy of ideologies. His aesthetic rationality integrates the divided concepts of literature as an ideology to empower the masses and literature as an art free of any political context. This is why Kim often emphasizes the universality of rationality. Universality derives from the ability to impartially observe life and reality. Having a universal perspective based on flexible and holistic rationality is far from making judgments mechanically. A person’s awareness of their potential for universality is what saves them from reality and connects them to it. Kim sees rationality as “the best means to perceive the marvels of the physical world or lifeworld.”

He established the criteria for evaluation on creative works that internalize conflict and intelligence by confronting social reality through expression. As a result of synthesizing and analyzing the binary oppositions of technique-theme, subjectivity-objectivity, and self-reality, he proposed structural weaknesses and potential of Korean poetry.

Kim is the founding member of Literatures of the World (세계의 문학), a quarterly magazine published by Minumsa publishing group (민음사). He is also a member of the National Academy of Arts, Republic of Korea (대한민국예술원). In 2000, he served as the president of the organizing committee for the 1st Seoul International Literature Forum for Literature (서울국제문학포럼). In 2004, he served as the organizer of the Frankfurt International Book Fair.

Kim won the 1981 Seoul Culture and Arts Award for Best Criticism, the 2003 Green Stripes Order of Service Merit, and the 2005 19th Inchon Award for Humanities and Literature. In 2022, he was awarded the Gold Crown Order of Cultural Merit (South Korea) by the government of South Korea, the highest possible recognition in the sphere of culture and arts.

== Works ==
The structure and content of Kim Uchang’s literary criticism have a very wide range. His criticism contemplates literary works through the lens of humanities theory, including politics, aesthetics, and ethics. The context of the symbolic meaning of art is ultimately reconstructed through this consideration. Poetry criticisms written in the early days of his study sought ways to connect literature, society, and humans by using poetry as the object of a theoretical embodiment.

In reconstructing the role and function of literature through humanistic contemplation, Kim demonstrated that such is the ethical medium that fundamentally constitutes a pluralistic relationship between a literary work and its author.

He combined an aesthetic sense with ethical value by separating and reconciling individual ethics and social ethics. His criticism of Yong-Un Han, Dong-Ju Yoon, and Hyun-Sung Kim in terms of ethical imagination is one example of his attempt to combine aesthetic sense with ethical value. In the end, his “aesthetic rationality” aims for ethical value. He rejected absolute aesthetics and embraced ethical imagination in his criticism. His theoretical depth and his discourse on literary history presented positive potential in South Korean literature.

- Poets in a Destitute Time (궁핍한 시대의 시인)

Poets in a Destitute Time is a collection of Kim’s critical essays that was published by Minumsa in 1977. It is subtitled “Essays on Contemporary Literature and Society.” This book consists of four parts. Part 1 contains critiques that view the formation and development of modern literature in principle, with a focus on poems and novels written during the Japanese colonial era. Part 2 is composed of critiques that investigate the poetic world of contemporary writers and poets. Part 3 is a collection of articles that examine the status of literary criticism and the depth of contemporary criticism. Part 4 contains articles that reveal the peculiarity of literature itself, which distinguishes literature from other epistemological theories.

In this review, Kim emphasizes the aspect of literature that is a medium for historical rationality, that is, a principle of self-transcendence inherent in reality rather than a mere reflection of reality through abstract rationality. In other words, literature which recognizes concrete universality and seeks the principle of transcendence thorough recognition points the way for Korean literature to evolve rather than distorting reality by a priori reasoning.

With this understanding, Kim theoretically clarified the dialectical relationship between “I” and “Us,” and the relationship between literature and reality, individuality and universality, and sensitivity and rationality.

He analyzed and organized the literature to reveal the dialectical relationship between the previous and contemporary era.

The dialectical understanding of the relationship between literature and reality, as well as reason and practice, suggests that an important feature of literature is the integration of perceptions from two opposing grounds. It also serves as a framework for systematizing the history of Korean literature.

- From the Sea of Strange Thoughts (기이한 생각의 바다에서)

From the Sea of Strange Thoughts is a collection of humanities lectures by Kim. It is subtitled “Self-formation and its Path, a Task in the Humanities.” This is the ninth book of Kim’s ‘Humanities Lectures Series.’ Kim said that “self-evolving is what allows human beings to complete themselves.” In this respect, this work examines the problem of self-formation using logical and systematic thinking. Kim inspects various essential questions of humanity, such as the process of human self-formation, a proper way to take care of oneself, and many other views on happiness. He explains the pursuit of self-formation with the concept of innate imperfection of human beings. Humans are incomplete beings when they are born, both physically and mentally, and they each develop their own world that allows them to meet their survival needs. The right process of self-formation can potentially lead to satisfaction and happiness that come from self-realization and the awareness of an ideal society, which allows people to pursue the right way of self-formation. Therefore, according to Kim, individual intellect provides insight into the whole world, and is a part of the intellectual development of all mankind.

=== Works in Korean ===
- The Boundaries and Horizons of Literature (문학의 경계와 지평, 2016)
- Imagination of the Object and Art (사물의 상상력과 미술, 2016)
- On Art (예술론, 2016)
- Currents of History and Reflections - Volumes 1-2 (시대의 흐름과 성찰 1-2, 2016)
- Talks and Interviews - Volumes 1-2 (대담/인터뷰 1-2, 2016)
- Landscape and Mind (풍경과 마음, 2016)
- The World of Politics and Life (정치와 삶의 세계, 2016)
- Truth in the Age of Pluralism (다원 시대의 진실, 2016)
- Mountains, Seas, and Paths of Thoughts (산과 바다와 생각의 길, 2016)
- Three Circles (세 개의 동그라미, 2016)
- Poets in the Poor Age (궁핍한 시대의 시인, 2015)
- Literature and Beyond (문학과 그 너머, 2015)
- Lawless Road (법 없는 길, 2015)
- Universal Ideology and Everyday Life (보편 이념과 나날의 삶, 2015)
- Towards a Rational Society (이성적 사회를 향하여, 2015)
- A Jewel of a Poet (시인의 보석, 2015)
- Selected Critical Essays by Kim Uchang (김우창 평론선집, 2015)
- A Fisherman That Catches the Ocean (바다를 낚는 어부, 2014)
- The Ecology of a Deep Mind (깊은 마음의 생태학, 2014)
- From the Sea of Strange Thoughts (기이한 생각의 바다에서, 2012)
- Reflections (성찰, 2011)
- Kim Uchang (김우창, 2008)
- Writing for Peace (평화를 위한 글쓰기, 2006)
- A Close Reading of Yu Jongho (유종호 깊이 읽기, 2006)
- Standing in the Currents of History (시대의 흐름에 서서, 2005)
- Landscape and Mind (풍경과 마음, 2003)
- Modern Philosophies of 103 Thinkers (103인의 현대사상, 2003)
- Coral, Pearl, and Geuma (산호와 진주와 금아, 2003)
- Writing Across Boundaries (경계를 넘어 글쓰기, 2001)
- The World of Politics and Life (정치와 삶의 세계, 2000)
- The Environment and Cities in the 21st Century (21세기의 환경과 도시, 2000)
- How Do Images Live? (이미지는 어떻게 살고 있는가, 1999)
- A Study on Midang (미당 연구, 1994)
- The Study of Aesthetic Rationality (심미적 이성의 탐구, 1992)
- Horizons of Literature (문학의 지평, 1991)
- Criteria on Earth (지상의 척도, 1987)

=== Works in translation ===
- Korean Literature: Its Classical Heritage and Modern Breakthroughs
- Le Roman coréen : Essais de littérature et de philosophie
- Writing Across Boundaries
- Landscape and Mind: Essays on East Asian Landscape Painting

See Also

- “Literature, Individual, Reality” (문학, 개인, 현실, 1977)
- “Creativity of Criticism” (비평의 창조성, 1977)
- “The Dialectics of the Part and the Whole” (부분과 전체의 변증법, 1981)
- “Universality Without Concept–Kim Uchang’s ‘Study on Aesthetic Rationality’” (개념 없는 보편성–김우창 저 ‘심미적 이성의 탐구', 1993)
- “Universal Truth and a Criterion on Earth–‘Kim Uchang’” (보편적인 진실과 지상의 척도– ‘김우창 전집', 1994)
- “Literature and Political Imagination–Kim Uchang’s Criticism” (문학과 정치적 상상력–김우창의 비평세계, 1995)

== Awards ==
- 2022: Gold Crown, Order of Cultural Merit, South Korea
- 2015: 11th Kyung-Ahm Prize in Humanities and Social Science
- 2005: 19th Inchon Award for Humanities and Literature
- 2003: Green Stripes Order of Service Merit
- 2000: 41st Korea Baeksang Publishing Culture Award for Nonfiction
- 1998: Korea University Scholar Award
- 1997: 14th Geumho Scholar Award
- 1994: 2nd Daesan Literary Award for Best Criticism
- 1993: 4th Palbong Literary Criticism Award
- 1981: Seoul Culture and Arts Award for Best Criticism
