= Kim Soo-jin (mineralogist) =

South Korean mineralogist (1939–2025)

- Hangul: 김수진
- Hanja: 金洙鎭
- RR: Gim Sujin
- MR: Kim Sujin

Kim Soo-jin (Korean: 김수진; January 15, 1939 – January 10, 2025) was a South Korean mineralogist and academic, who was the discoverer of Janggunite.

== Biography ==
Kim was born on January 15, 1939. He studied geology, receiving a bachelor of science in 1961, and a master's and a doctorate by 1971 from Seoul National University. He then studied mineralogy as a Humboldt Research Fellow at the Ruprecht Karl University of Heidelberg in 1972, achieving a doctorate in mineralogy in 1974.

In 1968, Kim Soo-jin became the first full-time professor of mineralogy of Seoul National University's Department of Geology. In 1975, Kim discovered a new mineral, Janggunite. In 1986, he became the first president of the Mineralogical Society of Korea, and served two more terms as its second and third president until 1992. On July 8, 1994, he became the youngest elected member of the National Academy of Sciences of the Republic of Korea. He was made professor emeritus in 2004.

Kim Soo-jin died on January 10, 2025, at the age of 85.
