= Cho Chi-hun =

South Korean writer (1920–1968)

- Born: Cho Dong-tak; December 3, 1920; Yeongyang
- Died: May 17, 1968 (aged 47)
- Children: Cho Tae-yul (son)
- Writing career
- Language: Korean

- Cho Chi-hun
- Hangul: 조지훈
- Hanja: 趙芝薰
- RR: Jo Jihun
- MR: Cho Chihun

Cho Chi-hun (Korean: 조지훈; December 3, 1920 – May 17, 1968) was a Korean poet, critic, and activist.

== Biography ==
Cho Chi-hun was born on December 3, 1920, in Yeongyang, Keishōhoku Province, Korea, Empire of Japan. His birthname was Cho Dong-tak. He graduated from Hyehwa College in 1941 with a degree in Liberal Arts. He taught at Odaesan Buddhist College and in 1946, after Korean Liberation, founded the Association of Young Writers (Cheongnyeon munhakga hyeophoe). Cho also served as president of the Society of Korean Poets (Hanguk Siin hyeophoe) and from 1947 served as a professor at Korea University. Cho Chi-hun was also the first head of the Korea University National Culture Research Institute. He died on May 17, 1968.

Cho Chi-hun's birthplace is preserved in Irwol-myeon in Yeongyang. A memorial to him stands on Namsan in Seoul.

== Work ==
Of Cho Chi-hun's writing, the Korea Literature Translation Institute writes:

:Fine classical beauty of Korea expressed in this work evokes within the reader a feeling of peace and tranquility. "The Grief of Phoenix" (Bonghwangsu), while keenly describing several secrets of the architectural beauty of the palace, contrasts those who held sovereign power in the Joseon era with the intellectuals of the colonial period, exposing the pain and tragic feelings of governed classes. These first poems of Cho Jihun, capturing the lyrical expression of Korea's traditional and national consciousness, are contained in 'The Blue Deer Anthology' (Cheongrokjip), a joint collection shared with two others, Pak Tu-jin and Pak Mog-wol.

:Directly after Liberation, contemporary Cho Jihun emphasized that only those who guarded a purely poetic aesthetic could be considered poets, and asserted that the protection of individual freedom and the quest for the liberation of human nature was the essence of poetry. This literary purity and nationalistic fervor are proclaimed in the poet's patriotic voice in his anthology, 'Standing Before History' (Yeoksa apeseo). The work criticizes, with a lucid historical consciousness, the political corruption and social irrationality engendered by the national division and internal strife of the day. In particular, "Dabuwoneseo" is one of the finest examples of war poetry that keenly depicts the tragic state of internal strife based on a personal experience.

== The Nun's Dance ==
Cho Chi-hun's early love of Korean tradition is expressed in his poem "The Nun's Dance" (승무(僧舞)).

The beginning of the dance, the nun bows at her shrine

얇은 사(紗) 하이얀 고깔은 고이 접어서 나빌레라.

Folded delicately to shape
The fine gauze white cowl
Wavers gently.

파르라니 깎은 머리 박사(薄紗) 고깔에 감추오고,

The bluish head shaved close
Is veiled under the tenuous cowl.

두 볼에 흐르는 빛이 정작으로 고와서 서러워라.

The glow in the cheeks
Graces her in her sorrow.

빈 대(臺)에 황촉(黃燭)불이 말없이 녹는 밤에 오동(梧桐)잎 잎새마다 달이 지는데,

The wax candle quietly burns in an empty hall,
And the moon sinks into every paulownia leaf.

소매는 길어서 하늘은 넓고,

돌아설 듯 날아가며 사뿐히 접어 올린 외씨보선이여.

Her long sleeves against the vast heaven
Billow up as if on the wing.
O how shapely her white socks match her movement!

까만 눈동자 살포시 들어 먼 하늘 한 개 별빛에 모두오고,

She raises her dark eyes to gaze
On a star in the far off sky.

복사꽃 고운 뺨에 아롱질 듯 두 방울이야 세사(世事)에 시달려도 번뇌(煩惱)는 별빛이라.

Her cheeks fair as peach blossoms
Are stained with a tear-drop or two.
In the face of worldly cares
Her suffering shines like a star.

휘어져 감기우고 다시 접어 뻗는 손이 깊은 마음 속 거룩한 합장(合掌)인 양하고,

Her arms swaying and turning,
Folding and unfolding, tell
Of her devout prayer at heart.

이 밤사 귀또리도 지새우는 삼경(三更)인데, 얇은 사(紗) 하이얀 고깔은 고이 접어서 나빌레라.

When the very crickets cry through the midnight
The fine gauze white cowl wavers
Gently, delicately folded into shape.

The origin of the dance antedates the introduction of Buddhism into Korea and expresses the traditional Korean philosophy of the harmony of heaven and earth. Popularly, however, it is taken to represent the inner conflict of an apostate nun, or the sorrow of a beautiful woman's renunciation of her erotic past, which the poet references. The dancer Han Yong-Suk used to claim that it was her performance which inspired the poet, after he had watched it many times.

== Works in Translation ==
- Brother Enemy (한국전쟁 시선집)

== Works in Korean (partial) ==
Criticism

- A Theory on History of Korean Culture

Anthologies

- The Blue Deer
- Short Lines over Grasses:풀잎 단장(斷章)
- Selected Poems of Cho Chi-hun
- Stand Before History
- Lingering Resonance
- Stylish Antique Costumes:고풍의상(古風依裳)

Essays

- Leaning against the Window
- Poetry and Life
- Theory of Integrity
- Aesthetics of Rocks.

== Awards ==
- Literature Prize of the Free Writers' Association, 1956

== See also ==
- List of Korean-language poets
- Korean poetry
- Korean literature
- Society of Korean Poets
