= Kwanhun Club =

South Korean organization

The Kwanhun Club (관훈클럽), established in 1957, is an organization based in the Republic of Korea. The club's official goals were to promote a better understanding of the principles of freedom of speech and to encourage the development of the newspaper through the adoption of responsible journalistic principles by Korean journalists.

Kwanhun Club started out as a small group of young front-line journalists trying to educate their colleagues about American journalistic viewpoints and techniques. The group soon grew into a national movement as it swiftly expanded in numbers and influence. These journalists were trying to introduce novel techniques into the Korean newspaper industry and by December 1959 the club had successfully recruited forty-seven members. These members represented leading journalists from South Korea's most esteemed newspapers and publishers.

The club held regular meetings where they discussed the role of the media in society and began publishing featured articles on the journalistic profession. American officials and journalists were invited to speak at club meetings about the importance of objective reporting, the meaning of the freedom of the press, and other corresponding topics. Korean reporters also visited the United States in order to better understand the culture of American media and gain insight on how to acquire the skills and knowledge needed to transmit information to a wider audience.

Within a short period of time, this new generation of South Korean writers and publishers successfully made free press a widely sought after ideal within the journalistic community. As a result, freedom of the press has become commonplace as many believe democracy would cease to exist without it. In this way, the Kwanhun club continues to have great influence to this day.

== Awards ==
- 2004: Inchon Award

== Citation ==
- Introduction to Kwanhun Club. Retrieved from http://www.kwanhun.com/
- Founding Members. Retrieved from http://www.kwanhun.com/
- What they do. Retrieved from http://www.kwanhun.com/
- Kwanhun kullop sasimnyonsa, 15–20. Retrieved from http://www.kwanhun.com/
- Brazinsky, Gregg. National Building in South Korea, (2007), Korea Foundation, Korea
