= Yoon Nung-min =

South Korean chemist

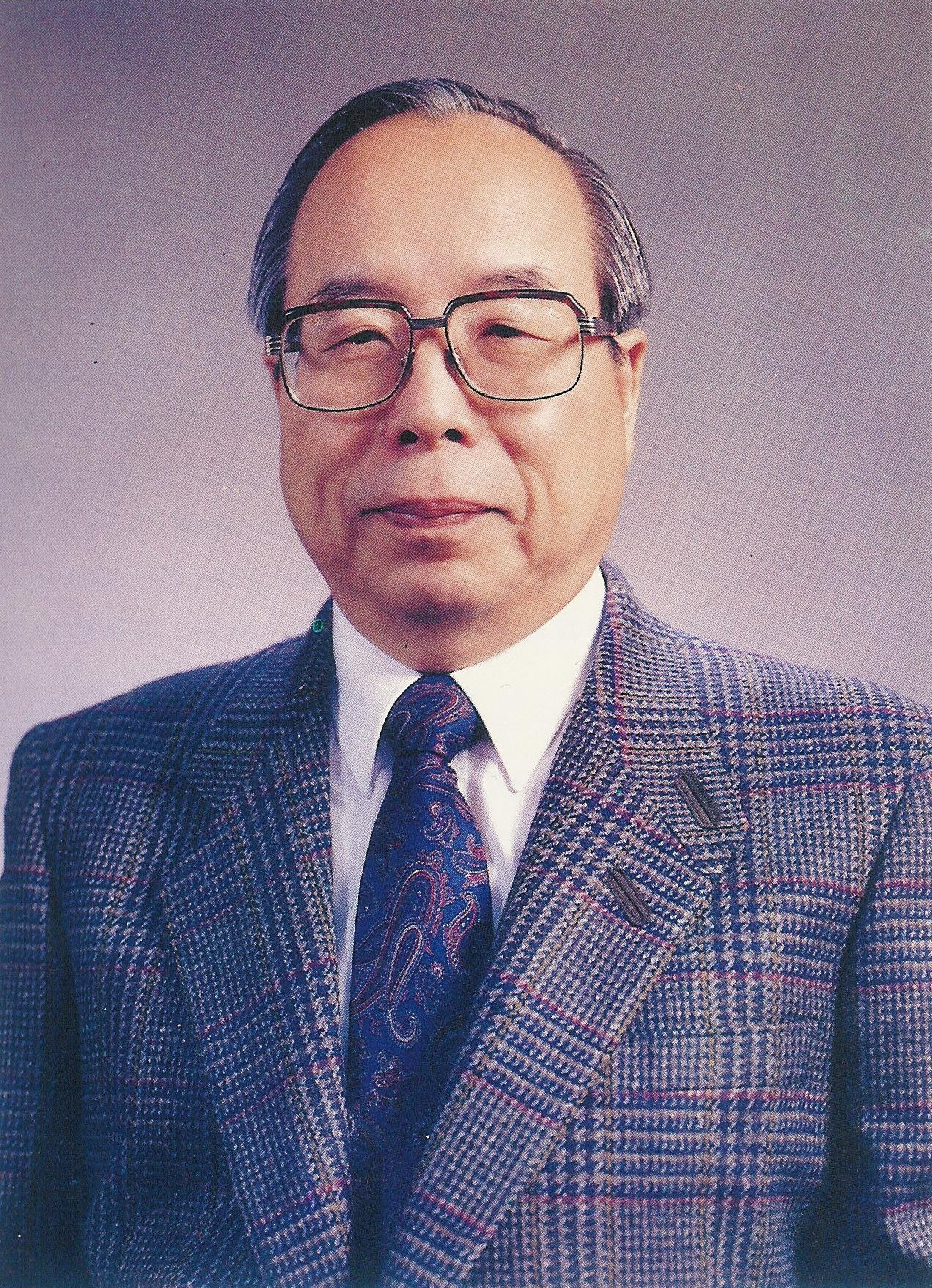
- Born: November 21, 1927; Chunghwa County, Kōkai Province, Korea, Empire of Japan
- Died: April 1, 2009 (aged 81); South Korea
- Education: Purdue University; Seoul National University
- Awards: Order of Civil Merit (Mongnyeon Medal); Korea National Academy of Sciences Award; Inchon Award for Science
- Scientific career
- Fields: Chemistry
- Workplaces: Sogang University
- Doctoral advisor: Herbert Charles Brown

Korean name
- Hangul: 윤능민
- Hanja: 尹能民
- RR: Yun Neungmin
- MR: Yun Nŭngmin

Yoon Nung-min (Korean: 윤능민; November 21, 1927 – April 1, 2009) is a South Korean chemist, known for his research in organic chemistry, specializing in metal hydrides.

He received his B.A. at Seoul National University in chemistry in 1951 and went on to complete his Ph.D. at Purdue University, under Herbert Charles Brown. He was a postdoc at Purdue, then a researcher for the Ministry of National Defence. He then became an associate professor at the Catholic University of Korea. He later took up full professorship at Sogang University, a position he would hold until his retirement. He served as the president of the Korean Chemical Society in 1989, and was elected a member of the National Academy of Sciences of the Republic of Korea in 2005. He was Professor Emeritus at Sogang University until his death in 2009.

He was a proficient researcher; he published 110 papers and developed reagents which became widely used in both organic and inorganic chemistry. He also discovered new methods of generating free radicals and found new applications. He surprised the Korean chemistry community by publishing a substantial portion of his research as the sole author shortly before his retirement.

He has also been active as an educator. He taught 14 doctorate students, and 56 masters students.

He was awarded the Order of Civil Merit (Mongnyeon Medal) in 1983, Korea National Academy of Sciences Award in 1993 and the Inchon Award for Science in 1995.

== Selected publications ==
- An Excellent Nickel Boride Catalyst for the Cis-Selective Semihydrogenation of Acetylenes Tetrahedron (J. Choi and N. M. Yoon), Tetrahedron Lett. Vol.37 p. 1057 (1996)
- A New Coupling Reaction of Alkyl Iodides with Electron Deficient Alkenes Using Nickel Boride(cat.)- Borohydride Exchange Resin in Methanol (T. B. Sim, J. Choi, M. J. Joung and N. M. Yoon), J. Org. Chem. Vol.62 p. 2357 (1997)
- Sodium Diethyldialkynylaluminate A New Chemoselective Alkynylating Agent (J. H. Ahn, M. J. Joung, and N. M. Yoon) J. Org. Chem. Vol.60 p. 6173 (1995)
- Synthesis of Disulfides by Copper Catalyzed Disproportionation of Thiols (J. Choi and N. M. Yoon), J. Org. Chem. Vol.60 p. 3266 (1995)
- Monoisopinocampheylborane- A New Chiral Hydroborating Agent for Relatively Hindered (Trisubstituted) Olefins (H. C. Brown and N. M. Yoon), J. Am. Chem. Soc. Vol.99 p. 5514 (1977)
- Diisopinocampheylborane of high Optical Purity. Asymmetric Synthesis via Hydroboration with Essentially Complete Asymmetric Induction (H. C. Brown and N. M. Yoon), Israel J. Chem Vol.15 p. 12 (1976~1977)
- Lithium Trimethylethynylaluminate A New Chemoselective Ethynylating Agent (M. J. Joung, J. H. Ahn and N. M. Yoon), J. Org. Chem. Vol.61 p. 4472 (1996)
- The Rapido Reaction of Carboxylic Acids with Borane-Tetrahydrofuran. A Remarkably Convenient Procedure for the Selective Conversion of Carboxylic Acids to the Corresponding Alcohols in the Presence of Other Functional Groups (N. M. Yoon, C. S. Park, H. C. Brown, S. Krishnamurthy, and T. P. Stoky), J. Org. Chem. Vol.38 p. 2786 (1973)
