= Kim Jong-gil =

South Korean poet (1926–2017)

- Born: November 5, 1926; Andong, Korea, Empire of Japan
- Died: April 1, 2017 (aged 90)
- Education: Korea University
- Writing career
- Language: Korean

Korean name
- Hangul: 김종길
- Hanja: 金宗吉
- RR: Gim Jonggil
- MR: Kim Chonggil

Kim Jong-gil (Korean: 김종길; November 5, 1926–April 1, 2017) was an early-modern South Korean poet.

== Life ==
Kim Jong-gil was born on November 5, 1926, in Andong, Keishōhoku Province (North Gyeongsang Province), Korea, Empire of Japan. He graduated from Korea University with undergraduate and graduate degrees in English Literature. He also conducted research in English Literature at Sheffield University. Kim has worked as a professor at several universities, including Chonggu University, Gyeongbuk University and Korea University. He died on April 1, 2017.

== Work ==
Kim Jong-gil's poetics are exemplified by a concentrated focus on maintaining clarity and lucidity, and by his skillful exploration of the power of the poetic image. The idea of imagery possessed for the poet a near transcendental value, which he believed could enable both poet and reader alike to attain a greater understanding of truth. His poetic methodology can be thus understood only in the context of his attitude towards life, which functioned through the medium of clear, concrete images.

Kim's work successfully incorporated ideas heralded from Imagism, a modern poetic tradition espoused by poets such as Amy Lowell, HD, and Ezra Pound, and the traditional style of hansi and the spirit of Seonbi. But unlike other imagist poetry of the time, Kim's works exude a classical or traditional elegance, which in turn endows the work with a sense of integrity and completion. This traditional elegance is most visible in the poet's emotional restraint and his detachment from the external world. In addition to this emotional restraint, the poet also focuses on the virtue of decency as an effective means of conveying sorrow. In "Marking" (Chaejeom), for example, the poet silently marks the paper of a student who has just died and enters the grade in his report card. This unspoken sorrow and contemplation of death ultimately lead to a more understated and more powerful impact on the reader. Thus the most fundamental and important characteristic of Kim's poetry is its extensive insight into life and the depth of the mind, through the cultivation of restraint, decency, and imagination.

Kim won the 2007 Cheong Ma Literature Award, the 2005 Lee Yuksa Poetry Award, and the 2005 Ko San Literature Award.

== Works in translation ==
Spanish

- Ya queda poca luz del dia (김종길 시선)

German

- Nachtkerze (달맞이꽃)

== Works in Korean (partial) ==
Poetry Collections

- Seongtanje
- Hahoe-eseo
- Hwangsa hyeonsang

Literary Criticism

- Siron
- Jinsil gwa eoneo
- Hanguksiui wisang.

== Awards ==
- 1996: Inchon Award
- 2005: Ko San Literature Award
- 2005: Lee Yuksa Poetry Award
- 2007: Cheong Ma Literature Award
