= Blue Deer school =

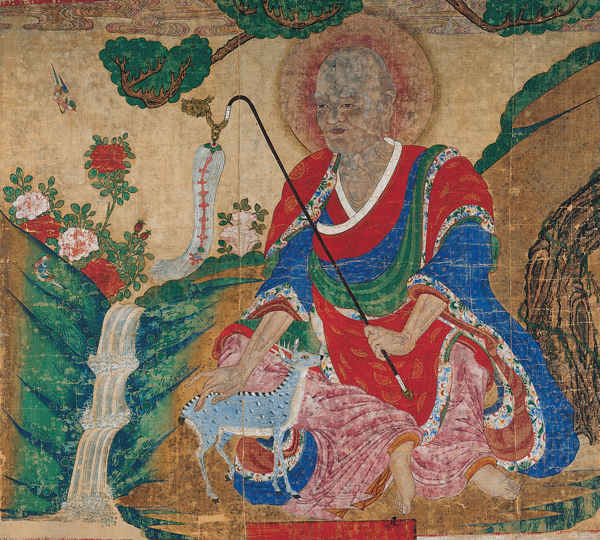
A blue deer heralds awakening, Korean silk painting

The Blue Deer school (Cheongnokpa, Korean: 청록파) is named after a poetry collection published by three Korean poets in 1946. Through the celebration of the natural beauty of their country, they heralded there the national awakening after some four decades of Japanese repression. Though the poets differ from each other in terms of poetic orientation and expression, technique and rhythm, they share the common theme of celebrating human aspirations and values.

The anthology was named after a poem by one of the participants, Park Mok-wol. From his Blue Deer, a work of pure lyricism, grows the suggested anticipation of the coming spring after the long years of occupation.

Far away stands Ch’ong un Temple
an old tile-roofed building.

There at Cha Ha Mountain
when spring snows melt

The elms
sprout twelve-fold leaves.

In the clear eye
of a blue deer

Float
clouds.

Included in this anthology were fifteen poems by Park Mok-wol, twelve by Cho Chi-hun and twelve by Pak Tu-jin. The 70th anniversary of its publication was celebrated in 2016 by various events in Korea, including a public reading of the poems.
