= Pak Mok-wol =

Korean poet and academic (1916–1978)

- Born: January 6, 1916; Gyeongju, Korea
- Died: March 24, 1978 (aged 62); Yongsan District, Seoul, South Korea
- Occupation: Poet
- Writing career
- Language: Korean

Korean name
- Hangul: 박영종
- Hanja: 朴泳鍾
- RR: Bak Yeongjong
- MR: Pak Yŏngjong

Pen name
- Hangul: 박목월
- Hanja: 朴木月
- RR: Bak Mokwol
- MR: Pak Mogwŏl

Pak Mok-wol (Korean: 박목월, 6 January 1916 – 24 March 1978) was an influential Korean poet and academic.

== Personal life ==
He was born Pak Yeongjong on January 6, 1916, in Moryang Village, Seo-myeon, Gyeongju, North Gyeongsang Province, in present-day South Korea, to parents Pak Jun-pil (박준필; 朴準弼) and Pak In-jae (박인재; 朴仁哉). He had a younger brother and two younger sisters. He graduated from Keisung Middle School (today Keisung High School) in Daegu in 1935. He lived in Tokyo from April 1937 until late 1939, during which period he devoted his time to writing. From September 1939 to September 1940, he had several of his poems published in the magazine Munjang. Afterwards, due to increasing wartime censorship by the Japanese colonial government, he continued writing privately but did not publish any further poetry until after the liberation of Korea. He was married to Yu Ik-sun (유익순; 劉益順), with whom he had four sons and a daughter.

Pak taught at various schools including Keisung Middle School and Ewha Girls' High School beginning in 1946, before joining the faculty of Hongik University as an assistant professor in 1953. In 1961 he took up a position as associate professor at Hanyang University (at which a statue was erected in his honor), and in 1963 he became a full professor there. He was later named the dean of the university's College of Humanities. In 1966 he was elected to the National Academy of Arts of the Republic of Korea (Yesurwon). He was a board member of the Society of Korean Poets from its founding in 1957, and was chosen as the society's chairman in 1968. He died on March 24, 1978, at his home in Wonhyoro-dong, Yongsan District, Seoul.

== Work ==
Pak Mok-wol began his career as a member of Cheongrok-pa (the Blue Deer school), a group of three poets who also included Cho Chi-hun and Pak Tu-jin, all named after the 1946 anthology in which they appeared. Although they differed in style, their work largely had its basis in natural description and human aspiration. The body of Pak Mok-wol's work at this time established a new trend in Korean poetry, one that attempted to express childlike innocence and wonder at life through folk songs and dialectal poetic language.

Among such poems, "The Wayfarer" (나그네) is notable and was set by the musician Isang Yun as the last in his early song book Dalmuri (A Halo, 1950).

강나루 건너서
밀밭길을

구름에 달 가듯이
가는 나그네

길은 외줄기
남도삼백리

술 익는 마을마다
타는 저녁놀

구름에 달 가듯이
가는 나그네

Translation:

Across the ferry
by the path through the corn

like the moon through the clouds
the wayfarer goes.

The road stretches south
three hundred li

every wine-mellowing village
afire in the evening light

as the wayfarer goes
like the moon through the clouds.

After his experiences during the Korean War, Pak's work shifted in style. Now he strove to incorporate the pain, death, and even monotony of daily existence into his poetry without maintaining a standard of sentimental and lyrical quality. His poetry collections, Wild Peach Blossoms (Sandohwa) and Orchids and Other Poems (Nan. Gita) encapsulate his artistic aim to depict the shifting human response to both the joys and sorrows of life. His later poems, however, represent a return to the use of vivid colloquial language as the medium through which to express the color and vitality of local culture.

His collection of poems from this later stylistic phase, Fallen Leaves in Gyeongsang-do (Gyeongsang-doui garangnip) provides the artistic forum through which he is able to further explore his earlier questions of the relationship between light and dark, happiness and despair, and life and death. Pak's poetry, especially his later work, reveals a fervent love for life that does not wane despite his diligent acknowledgment of the ever-present threat of the end. He is celebrated for the cautious optimism of his work and his ability to subtly internalize conflicts of empiric reality in his deceptively localized and dialectal poetry.

== Awards and legacy ==
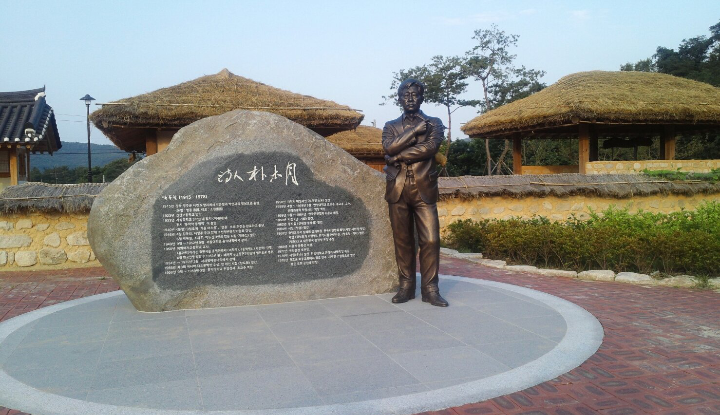
A statue of Pak Mok-wol in Gyeongju

Pak's awards include the Freedom Literature Awards, May Literature and Art Awards, the Seoul City Culture Awards (1969), and the Moran Medal of the Order of Civil Merit (1972). In 2007, he was listed by the Korean Poets' Association among the ten most important modern Korean poets.

Pak lived in a 37 pyeong (120 m^{2}) house in Wonhyoro-dong from 1965 until his death in 1978. The Seoul Municipal Government had expressed interest in preserving the house as a cultural heritage asset, but his son had to sell it to a real estate developer to cover debts in 2002, and the developer demolished the building in 2004. The demolition, along with similar incidents or near-misses involving the old houses of other cultural figures such as Choe Nam-seon and Seo Jeong-ju around the same time, sparked increasing public interest in the issue of cultural heritage preservation.

== Bibliography ==
Adapted from:

- Cheongrokjip 《靑鹿集》 (Seoul: Uryu Munhwasa [乙酉文化社], 1946. OCLC 612986308.) With Cho Chi-hun and Pak Tu-jin.
- Sandohwa 《山桃花》 (Daegu: Yong-ung Chulpansa [英雄出版社], 1955. OCLC 38315740.)
- Boratbit Somyo 《보랏빛 素描》 (Seoul: Sinheung Chulpansa [新興出版社], 1958. .)
- Nan. Gita 《蘭·其他》 (Seoul: Singu Chulpansa [新丘文化社], 1959. OCLC 975807277.)
- Sansaeal Mulsaeal 《산새알 물새알》 (Seoul: Munwonsa [文苑社], 1961. .)
- Guwonui Yeon-ga 《久遠의 戀歌》 (Seoul: Gumunsa [歐文社], 1962. OCLC 975668342.) With Kim Nam-jo.
- Cheongdam 《晴曇》 (Seoul: Iljogak [一潮閣], 1964. OCLC 975804746.)
- Eomeoni 《어머니》 (Seoul: Samjungdang [三中堂], 1967. OCLC 37220182.)
- Gyeongsang-doui Garang-nip 《慶尙道의 가랑잎》 (Seoul: Minjung Seogwan [民衆書館], 1968. OCLC 56718987.)
- Cheongrokjip Gita 《靑鹿集 其他》 (Seoul: Hyeonamsa [玄岩社], 1968. OCLC 38315860.) With Cho Chi-hun and Pak Tu-jin.
- Cheongrokjip Ihu 《青鹿集 以後》 (Seoul: Hyeonamsa [玄岩社], 1968. OCLC 758338683.) With Cho Chi-hun and Pak Tu-jin.
- Musun 《無順》 (Seoul: Samjungdang [三中堂], 1976. OCLC 975668842.)

=== Works in translation ===
- Selected Poems of Pak Mogwol, English (박목월 시선집. Uchang Kim, translator. Berkeley: Asian Humanities Press, 1990. OCLC 1036858493.)
- Le Passant, French (나그네. Kim Hyeon-ju and Pierre Mesini, translators. Marseille: Autres Temps, 2000. OCLC 248004898.)
- 《过客》, Chinese (나그네. Heo Se-uk [許世旭], translator. Tianjin: Baihua Wenyi Chubanshe [百花文艺出版社], 2003. OCLC 866238058.)

== See also ==
- Korean literature
- List of Korean-language poets
