= Chihui =

Concubine of 1st century king Yuri of Goguryeo

- Hangul: 치희
- Hanja: 雉姬
- Revised Romanization: Chihui
- McCune–Reischauer: Ch'ihŭi

Chihui (Korean: 치희; Hanja: 雉姬) was a concubine of Yuri of Goguryeo. She was the daughter of a man from the Western Han.

== Biography ==
The Samguk sagi records that after the death of his first wife, Queen Song (Korean: 왕후 송씨; Hanja: 王后 松氏), King Yuri took Chihui and another woman called Hwahui as concubines. The two women contended for the King's favour, and the level of discord was such that the King built two separate palaces and installed each woman in her own residence.

Once, when the king had been gone for seven days, Chihui and Hwahui were arguing. Hwahui reportedly scolded Chihui, saying 'you are a concubine from a Han family, how is it that you have no manners?' Incensed, Chihui returned to her home. On hearing this, King Yuri pursued Chihui on horseback, but she refused to return with him. He rested under a tree, from where he watched many yellow birds flying. Moved, he composed the Song of the Yellow Bird.
