= Song of the Yellow Bird =

Oldest known Korean song (17 B.C.)

- Author: Yuri of Goguryeo
- Original title: 황조가
- Language: Classical Chinese
- Publication date: 17 BCE
- Publication place: Korea

Song of the Yellow Bird (Korean: 황조가; Hanja: 黃鳥歌, Hwangjoga) is the oldest known Korean lyric poetry and was written by Yuri of Goguryeo in 17 BCE It was written lamenting the loss of one of his wives who left his household following a quarrel with another of his wives. While Yuri of Goguryeo was away hunting, his second wife, Chihui, who was Han Chinese, was scolded by his first wife, Hwa hui: “How can you be so rude even though you are only a concubine?" Chihui left the household, never to return. Missing her greatly, Yuri of Goguryeo wrote this song.

A translation into Hanja of Song of the Yellow Bird is recorded in the history book of Goryeo Dynasty, Samguk Sagi.

== Song structure ==
One day, Yuri of Goguryeo saw a couple of yellow birds (Oriolus chinensis) and wrote the Song of the Yellow Bird.

翩翩黃鳥，
雌雄相依。
念我之獨，
誰其與歸?

Orioles fly smoothly
Female and male cuddle close together
Thinking of my loneliness
Whom shall I go with?
