= Iljin Group =

South Korean conglomerate

- Native name: 일진홀딩스 주식회사
- Company type: Public
- Traded as: KRX: 015860
- Founded: 1968; 58 years ago
- Founder: Huh Chin-kyu
- Headquarters: Seoul, South Korea
- Website: iljin.co.kr

ILJIN Group is a Korean chaebol (conglomerate).

== History ==
The ILJIN Group was established in 1968 to produce high-voltage electrical transmission equipment. Founder Huh Chin-kyu (허진규) wanted to localise technology to foster South Korea's economic independence, and started the company after an earlier company he worked in as engineer went bust.

In addition to the production of cables and other high-voltage equipment, he ILJIN Group expanded to also produce special materials and components for electrical systems and communication equipment, and was ranked between the 50th and 60th largest companies in South Korea by assets. The company is a major producer of synthetic diamonds.

The ILJIN Group has 5 listed subsidiaries (ILJIN Electric, ILJIN Diamond, ILJIN Materials, ILJIN Display, Alpinion Medical Systems), employs 2500 employees and had revenues of approx US$2.5 billion in 2015.

ILJIN Electric, main subsidiary of the ILJIN Group had a turnover of approx US$1 billion in 2014, and currently employs 1000 employees. ILJIN Electric is a global leader in High voltage underground cables, with major projects achieved in Middle East, North America and Europe. ILJIN main competitors are Nexans, Prysmians and General Cable.

== Notable projects ==
The ILJIN Group, together with LG Cable, was the local partner of French company Cegelec in the supply and technology transfer of the catenary for the Korea Train Express.
