= Janggunite =

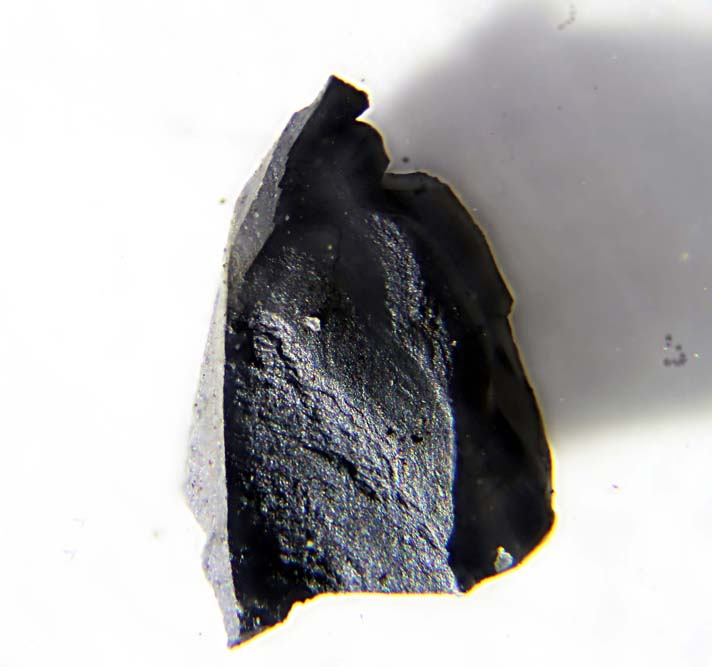
- Janggunite found in South Korea

General
- Category: Oxide mineral
- Formula: Mn_{5−x}(Mn,Fe)_{1+x}O_{8}(OH)_{6}
- IMA symbol: Jgn
- Strunz classification: 4.FG.05
- Crystal system: Orthorhombic
- Space group: Pman
- Unit cell: a = 9.324, b =14.05 c = 7.956 [Å], Z = 4

Identification
- Color: Black
- Cleavage: Perfect, one direction
- Tenacity: Fragile
- Mohs scale hardness: 2 - 3
- Luster: Dull
- Streak: Brownish black to dark brown
- Specific gravity: 3.59
- Optical properties: Biaxial

Janggunite is a rare manganese oxide mineral with the chemical formula Mn_{5−x}(Mn,Fe)_{1+x}O_{8}(OH)_{6}.

It was first described in 1975 for an occurrence in the Janggun mine, Bonghwa-gun, Gyeongsangbuk-do, South Korea and named for the locality.
