= Korean poetry =

Poetry performed or written in the Korean language or by Korean people

Korean poetry is poetry performed or written in the Korean language or by Korean people. Traditional Korean poetry is often sung in performance. Until the 20th century, much of Korean poetry was written in Hanja.

== History ==
The performance of oral songs in the religious life of the ancient Korean people is vividly recorded in Chinese dynastic histories. At state assemblies the chief ritualist would tell the story of the divine origin of the founder, as evinced by foundation myths, and his extraordinary deeds in war and peace. Recited narrative was interspersed with primal songs that not only welcomed, entertained, and sent off gods and spirits. Thus orality and performance were significant features of vernacular poetry in ancient Korea.

A famous surviving example dates to 17 BC, Yuri's Song of the Yellow Bird (Hwangjoga, 황조가/黃鳥歌), written to lament the departure of his Chinese concubine Chihui. Some later Korean poetry followed the style of Tang lyric poetry such as the shi poetry form.

Notable Korean poetry began to flourish during the Goryeo period (starting in 935). Collections were rarely printed.

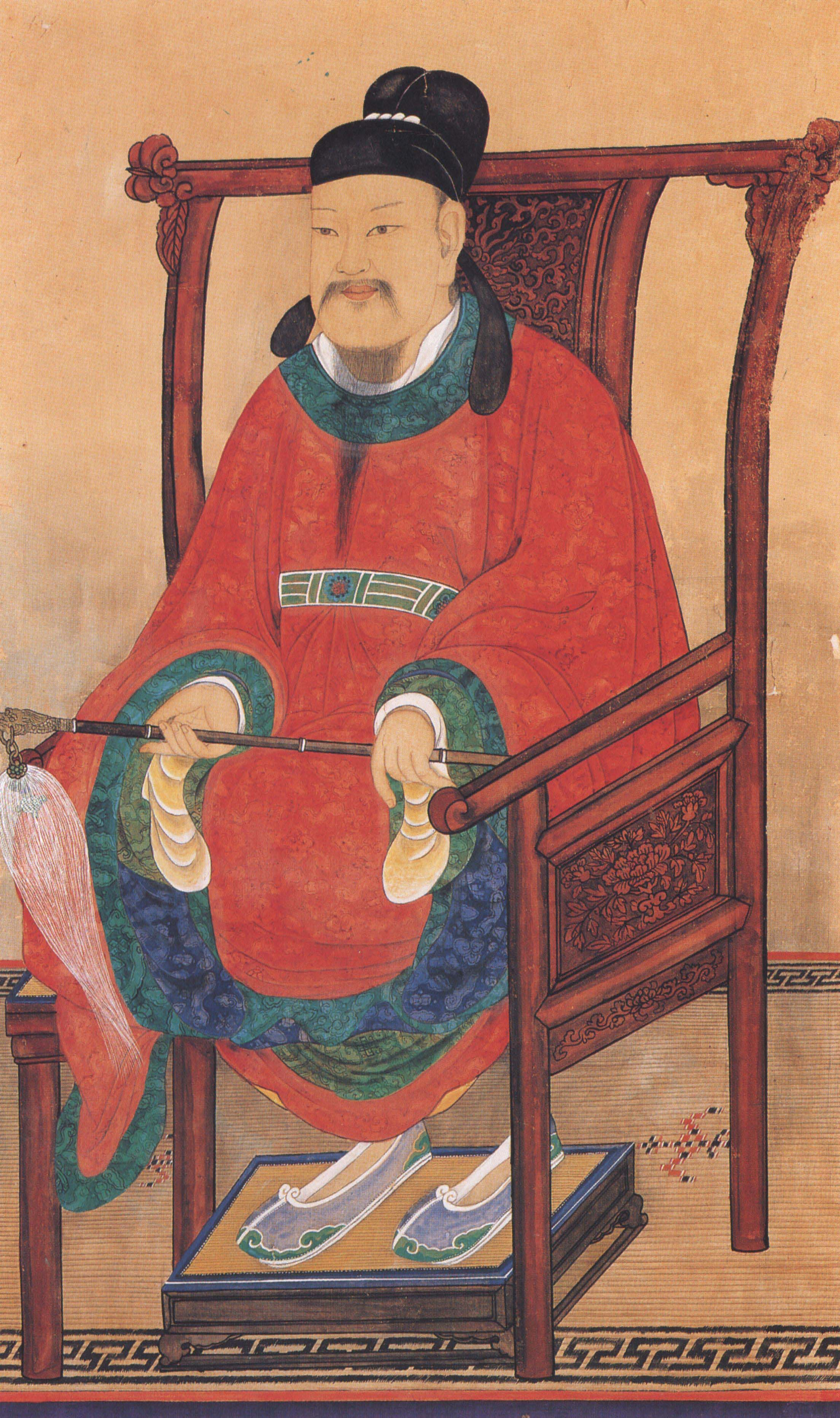
Ch'oe Ch'i-wŏn (857–10th century)

The earliest extant collection of poetry in Korean is "Songs of the Ten Vows Samantabhara" by Kyun Yeo (균여, 均如). This dates to 1075, just over a century after the poet's death.

Sijo, Korea's favorite poetic genre, is often traced to seonbi scholars of the 11th century, but its roots, too, are in those earlier forms. The earliest surviving poem of the sijo genre is from the 4th century. Its greatest flowering occurred in the 16th and 17th centuries under the Joseon dynasty.

== Hyangga ==
Hyangga poetry refers to vernacular Korean poetry which transcribed Korean sounds using Hanja (similar to the idu system, the hyangga style of transcription is called hyangch'al) and is characteristic of the literature of Unified Silla. It is one of the first uniquely Korean forms of poetry. The Goryeo period Samguk Yusa contains 14 poems that have been preserved to the present day. These are thought to have been taken by Ilyon (compiler of Samguk Yusa) from an anthology called the Samdaemok(삼대목/三代目) which was completed during the Shilla period, in 888 (according to Samguk Sagi), but is no longer extant today. This lost anthology is thought to have contained approximately 1,000 hyangga. Eleven poems from the later Goryeo dynasty Gyunyeojeon (균여전/均如傳), characterized by the same style, have also been preserved.

Hyangga are characterized by a number of formal rules. The poems may consist of four, eight or ten lines. The ten-line poems are the most developed, structured into three sections with four, four, and two lines respectively. Many of the ten-line poems were written by Buddhist monks. The extent of the Shilla hwarang's role in the development and flourishing of the hyangga genre is a subject of much scholarly interest.

== Goryeo songs ==
The Goryeo period was marked by a growing use of Hanja. Hyangga largely disappeared as a form of Korean literature, and "Goryeo songs" (Goryeo gayo) became more popular. Most of the Goryeo songs were transmitted orally and many survived into the Joseon period, when some of them were written down using hangul.

The poetic form of the Goryeo songs is known as byeolgok. There are two distinct forms: dallyeonche (단련체) and yeonjanche (연잔체). The former is a short form, whereas the latter is a more extended form. The Goryeo songs are characterized by their lack of clear form, and by their increased length. Most are direct in their nature, and cover aspects of common life.

== Sijo ==
Sijo is a traditional Korean vernacular poetic form that emerged in the Koryŏ period, flourished during the Chosŏn dynasty, and is still written today. Common themes include, but are not limited to, the following: nature, nostalgia of the past, love interests, historical events, moral instruction. Most were written and enjoyed by the educated yangban class. However, there was an exception to this. Kisaengs were of the lowest class, yet they could partake in creating and reciting sijo.

Structurally, 'sijo' is widely known to have three lines averaging 14-16 syllables, for a total of 44-46: theme (3, 4,4,4); elaboration (3,4,4,4); counter-theme (3,5) and completion (4,3). However, only a small percentage of sijo actually follow this structure. Instead of syllabic count, it is more accurate to structure sijo with hemistichs or syntactic units. Each line is composed of 2 hemistichs and within each hemistich is a syntactic unit, which is why there are 2 syntactic units in each sijo line. This structure, however, may vary dependent on the type of sijo as well. For instance, narrative sijo (sasol sijo) is more prose-like, with the second line being long and completely expanded. Sijo with the 3-line format follows a common structure of having the first line introduce the situation and establishing the theme. Line 2 elaborates on and develops the information provided in the first line. The first half of the third and final line employs a “twist”: a surprise of meaning, sound, or other device as well as a conclusion or resolution. This is to act as a counter to the theme that was introduced.

Example:

오늘이 오늘이소서 매일이 오늘이소서

저물지도 새지도 말으시고

새려면 늘 언제나 오늘이소서

Translation:

May today be today, may every day be today

May each day never end

But if it does, may it dawn into today

(By Flora Kim)

The first line of the poem indicates the theme of “today.” The second line denotes the narrator's personal feelings towards the theme introduced in the first line. The desire is that “today” will neither end nor begin a new day. The third and final line begins with the twist of “새려면,” meaning “But, if it must end (setting of the sun on a day)”. This is followed by the rest of the third line being the resolution to the day coming to a close—the narrator hopes that it is eternally “today.” Some poems are more thought out and clever than others by having deeper meanings and symbolism with the use of Chinese characters.

== Gasa ==
Gasa is a form of verse, although its content can include more than the expression of individual sentiment, such as moral admonitions. Gasa is a simple form of verse, with twinned feet of three or four syllables each. Some regard gasa a form of essay. Common themes in gasa were nature, the virtues of gentlemen, or love between man and woman.

The form first emerged during the Goryeo period, and was popular during the Joseon dynasty. They were commonly sung, and were popular among yangban women. Chŏng Ch'ŏl, a poet of the 16th century, is regarded as having perfected the form, which consisted of parallel lines, each broken into two.

== Modern poetry ==
See also South Korean literature and List of Korean-language poets

There were attempts at introducing imagist and modern poetry methods particularly in translations of early American moderns such as Ezra Pound and T. S. Eliot in the early 20th century. In the early Republic period (starting in 1953 after the Korean War), patriotic works were very successful.

Lyrical poetry dominated from the 1970s onwards. Poetry is quite popular in 21st century Korea, both in terms of number of works published and lay writing.

A corpus of modern Korean poetry is being compiled. The work provides linguistic information on 10,300 original Korean poems.

== See also ==
- Korean culture
- Korean literature
- List of Korean-language poets
