= Best Translated Book Award =

American literary award

- Awarded for: Best original translation of a work of fiction and poetry into English
- Sponsored by: Amazon.com
- Country: United States
- Hosted by: Three Percent
- Reward: $5,000
- First award: 2008
- Final award: 2020
- Website: besttranslatedbook.org

The Best Translated Book Award was an American literary award that recognized the previous year's best original translation into English, one book of poetry and one of fiction. It was inaugurated in 2008 and was conferred by Three Percent, the online literary magazine of Open Letter Books, which is the book translation press of the University of Rochester. A long list and short list were announced each year leading up to the award.

The award took into consideration not only the quality of the translation but the entire package: the work of the original writer, translator, editor, and publisher. The award was "an opportunity to honor and celebrate the translators, editors, publishers, and other literary supporters who help make literature from other cultures available to American readers."

In October 2010 Amazon.com announced it would be underwriting the prize with a $25,000 grant. This would allow both the translator and author to receive a $5,000 prize. Prior to this the award did not carry a cash prize.

In January 2023, the prize's initiator, Chad Post, announced on the Three Percent blog that the award, which had not been given out since 2020, would remain on "continued hiatus."

== Winners ==
=== Fiction ===
Year	Author	Title	Translator(s)	Language	Publisher
2008	(Germany) Dorothea Dieckmann	Guantanamo; Guantánamo	Tim Mohr	German	Soft Skull
2009	(Hungary) Attila Bartis	Tranquility; A nyugalom	Imre Goldstein	Hungarian	Archipelago
2010	(Israel) Gail Hareven	The Confessions of Noa Weber שאהבה נפשי	Dalya Bilu	Hebrew	Melville House Publishing
2011	(Finland) Tove Jansson	The True Deceiver; Den ärliga bedragaren	Thomas Teal	Swedish	New York Review Books
2012	(Poland) Wiesław Myśliwski	Stone Upon Stone; Kamień na kamieniu	Bill Johnston	Polish	Archipelago Books
2013	(Hungary) László Krasznahorkai	Satantango; Sátántangó	George Szirtes	Hungarian	New Directions
2014	(Hungary) László Krasznahorkai	Seiobo There Below; Seiobo járt odalent	Ottilie Mulzet	Hungarian	New Directions
2015	(China) Can Xue	The Last Lover 最后的情人	Annelise Finegan Wasmoen	Chinese	Yale University Press
2016	(Mexico) Yuri Herrera	Signs Preceding the End of the World; Señales que precederán al fin del mundo	Lisa Dillman	Spanish	And Other Stories
2017	(Brazil) Lúcio Cardoso	Chronicle of the Murdered House; Crônica da casa assassinada	Margaret Jull Costa; Robin Patterson	Portuguese	Open Letter Books
2018	(Argentina) Rodrigo Fresán	The Invented Part; La parte inventada	Will Vanderhyden	Spanish	Open Letter Books
2019	(France) Patrick Chamoiseau	Slave Old Man; L'esclave vieil homme et le molosse	Linda Coverdale	French	New Press
2020	(Croatia) Daša Drndić	EEG	Celia Hawkesworth	Croatian	New Directions

=== Poetry ===
Year	Author	Title	Translator	Language	Publisher
2009	(Japan) Takashi Hiraide	For the Fighting Spirit of the Walnut 胡桃の戦意のために	Sawako Nakayasu	Japanese	New Directions
2010	(Russia) Elena Fanailova	The Russian Version; Русская версия	Genya Turovskaya; Stephanie Sandler	Russian	Ugly Duckling Presse
2011	(Slovenia) Aleš Šteger	The Book of Things; Knjiga reči	Brian Henry	Slovenian	BOA Editions
2012	(Japan) Kiwao Nomura	Spectacle & Pigsty	Kyoko Yoshida; Forrest Gander	Japanese	Omnidawn
2013	(Romania) Nichita Stănescu	Wheel with a Single Spoke	Sean Cotter	Romanian	Archipelago Books
2014	(Italy) Elisa Biagini	The Guest in the Wood	Diana Thow; Sarah Stickney; Eugene Ostashevsky	Italian	Chelsea Editions
2015	(Mexico) Rocío Cerón	Diorama	Anna Rosenwong	Spanish	Phoneme Media
2016	(Brazil) Angélica Freitas	Rilke Shake	Hilary Kaplan	Portuguese	Phoneme Media
2017	(Argentina) Alejandra Pizarnik	Extracting the Stone of Madness; Extracción de la piedra de locura	Yvette Siegert	Spanish	New Directions
2018	(Greece) Eleni Vakalo	Before Lyricism	Karen Emmerich	Greek	Ugly Duckling Presse
2019	(Brazil) Hilda Hilst	Of Death. Minimal Odes; Da morte. Odes mínimas	Laura Cesarco Eglin	Portuguese	co-im-press
2020	(Lebanon) Etel Adnan	Time	Sarah Riggs	French	Nightboat Books

== Awards ==
The first awards were given in 2008 for books published in 2007. The Best Translation Book Awards are dated by the presentation year, with the book publication the previous year.

= winner.

=== 2008 ===
The award was announced January 4, 2008 for books published in 2007. It was the first award and was based on open voting by readers of Three Percent, who also nominated the longlist.

Fiction shortlist

Author	Title	Translator(s)	Language	Publisher
(Germany) Dorothea Dieckmann	Guantanamo; Guantánamo	Tim Mohr	German	Soft Skull
(Chile) Roberto Bolaño	The Savage Detectives; Los detectives salvajes	Natasha Wimmer	Spanish	Farrar, Straus & Giroux
(Argentina) Julio Cortázar	Autonauts of the Cosmoroute; Los autonautas de la cosmopista	Anne McLean	Spanish	Archipelago
(Iran) Mahmoud Dowlatabadi	Missing Soluch جای خالی سلوچ	Kamran Rastegar	Persian	Melville House
(France) Jean Echenoz	Ravel	Linda Coverdale	French	New Press
(Hungary) Gyula Krúdy	Sunflower; Napraforgó	John Batki	Hungarian	New York Review
(Norway) Per Petterson	Out Stealing Horses; Ut og stjæle hester	Anne Born	Norwegian	Graywolf
(Belgium) Paul Verhaeghen	Omega Minor	Paul Verhaeghen	Dutch	Dalkey Archive
(Spain) Enrique Vila-Matas	Montano's Malady; El mal de Montano	Jonathan Dunne	Spanish	New Directions
(Switzerland) Robert Walser	The Assistant; Der Gehülfe	Susan Bernofsky	German	New Directions

Poetry shortlist

Author	Title	Translator(s)	Language	Publisher
(Czech Republic) Ivan Blatný	The Drug of Art	Justin Quinn; Matthew Sweney; Alex Zucker; Veronika Tuckerová; Anna Moschovakis	Czech	Ugly Duckling
Various	The Dream of the Poem: Hebrew Poetry from Muslim and Christian Spain, 950–1492	Peter Cole	Hebrew	Princeton University
(Poland) Zbigniew Herbert	The Collected Poems: 1956–1998	Czesław Miłosz; Peter Dale Scott; Alissa Valles	Polish	Ecco

=== 2009 ===
The award was announced February 19, 2009 for book published in 2008. There was a ceremony at Melville House Publishing in Brooklyn hosted by author and critic Francisco Goldman.

Fiction shortlist

Author	Title	Translator(s)	Language	Publisher
(Hungary) (Romania) Attila Bartis	Tranquility; A nyugalom	Imre Goldstein	Hungarian	Archipelago
(Chile) Roberto Bolaño	2666	Natasha Wimmer	Spanish	Farrar, Straus & Giroux
(Chile) Roberto Bolaño	Nazi Literature in the Americas; La literatura nazi en América	Chris Andrews	Spanish	New Directions
(France) Céline Curiol	Voice Over; Voix sans issue	Sam Richard	French	Seven Stories
(Netherlands) Willem Frederik Hermans	The Darkroom of Damocles; De donkere kamer van Damokles	Ina Rilke	Dutch	Overlook
(Lebanon) Elias Khoury	Yalo يالو	Peter Theroux	Arabic	Archipelago
(El Salvador) (Honduras) Horacio Castellanos Moya	Senselessness; Insensatez	Katherine Silver	Spanish	New Directions
(Russia) (Belgium) Victor Serge	Unforgiving Years; Les Années sans pardon	Richard Greeman	French	New York Review
(Chile) Alejandro Zambra	Bonsai; Bonsái	Caro De Robertis	Spanish	Melville House
(Austria) Stefan Zweig	The Post Office Girl; Rausch der Verwandlung	Joel Rotenberg	German	New York Review

Poetry shortlist

Author	Title	Translator(s)	Language	Publisher
(Japan) Takashi Hiraide	For the Fighting Spirit of the Walnut 胡桃の戦意のために	Sawako Nakayasu	Japanese	New Directions
(France) Robert Desnos	Essential Poems and Writings	Mary Ann Caws; Terry Hale; Bill Zavatsky; Martin Sorrell; Jonathan Eburne; Katherine Connelly; Patricia Terry; Paul Auster	French	Black Widow
(France) Caroline Dubois	You Are the Business; C'est toi le business	Cole Swensen	French	Burning Deck
(Russia) Dmitry Golynko	As It Turned Out	Eugene Ostashevsky; Rebecca Bella; Simona Schneider	Russian	Ugly Duckling
(France) Valery Larbaud	Poems of A. O. Barnabooth; Les Poésies de A. O. Barnabooth	Ron Padgett; Bill Zavatsky	French	Black Widow
(Russia) Vladimir Mayakovsky	Night Wraps the Sky	Katya Apekina; Val Vinokur; Matvei Yankelevich	Russian	Farrar, Straus & Giroux
(Sweden) Fredrik Nyberg	A Different Practice; En annorlunda praktik	Jennifer Hayashida	Swedish	Ugly Duckling
(France) Raymond Queneau	EyeSeas; C'est toi le business	Daniela Hurezanu; Stephen Kessler	French	Black Widow
(Poland) Eugeniusz Tkaczyszyn-Dycki	Peregrinary; Peregrynarz	Bill Johnston	Polish	Zephyr
(Poland) Adam Zagajewski	Eternal Enemies	Clare Cavanagh	Polish	Farrar, Straus & Giroux

=== 2010 ===
The award was announced March 10, 2010 at Idlewild Books. According to award organizer Chad Post, "On the fiction side of things we debated and debated for weeks. There were easily four other titles that could've easily won this thing. Walser, Prieto, Aira were all very strong contenders."

Fiction shortlist

Author	Title	Translator(s)	Language	Publisher
(Israel) Gail Hareven	The Confessions of Noa Weber שאהבה נפשי	Dalya Bilu	Hebrew	Melville House
(Brazil) Ignácio de Loyola Brandão	Anonymous Celebrity; O Anônimo Célebre	Nelson Vieira	Portuguese	Dalkey Archive
(Norway) Jan Kjærstad	The Discoverer; Oppdageren	Barbara Haveland	Norwegian	Open Letter
(Argentina) César Aira	Ghosts; Los fantasmas	Chris Andrews	Spanish	New Directions
(Russia) Sigizmund Krzhizhanovsky	Memories of the Future; Воспоминания о будущем	Joanne Turnbull	Russian	New York Review
(Cuba) José Manuel Prieto	Rex	Esther Allen	Spanish	Grove Books
(Switzerland) Robert Walser	The Tanners; Geschwister Tanner	Susan Bernofsky	German	New Directions
(Netherlands) Gerbrand Bakker	The Twin; Boven is het stil	David Colmer	Dutch	Archipelago
(Austria) Wolf Haas	The Weather Fifteen Years Ago; Das Wetter vor 15 Jahren	Stephanie Gilardi; Thomas S. Hansen	German	Ariadne Press
(Belgium) Hugo Claus	Wonder; De verwondering	Michael Henry Heim	Dutch	Archipelago

Poetry shortlist

Author	Title	Translator(s)	Language	Publisher
(Russia) Elena Fanailova	The Russian Version; Русская версия	Genya Turovskaya; Stephanie Sandler	Russian	Ugly Duckling
(Canada) Nicole Brossard	Selections	Various	French	University of California
(France) René Char	The Brittle Age and Returning Upland	Gustaf Sobin	French	Counterpath
(Palestine) Mahmoud Darwish	If I Were Another	Fady Joudah	Arabic	Farrar, Straus & Giroux
(France) Valery Larbaud	Poems of A. O. Barnabooth; Les Poésies de A. O. Barnabooth	Ron Padgett; Bill Zavatsky	French	Black Widow
(Japan) Hiromi Itō	Killing Kanoko カノコ殺し	Jeffrey Angles	Japanese	Action
(Lithuania) Marcelijus Martinaitis	K. B.: The Suspect; K. B. Įtariamas	Laima Vince	Lithuanian	White Pine
(South Korea) Ra Heeduck	Scale and Stairs	Woo-Chung Kim; Christopher Merrill	Korean	Black Widow
(Serbia) Novica Tadić	Dark Things; Тамне ствари	Charles Simic	Serbian	BOA Editions
(Romania) Liliana Ursu	Lightwall	Sean Cotter	Romanian	Zephyr
(China) Wei Yingwu	In Such Hard Times	Red Pine	Chinese	Copper Canyon

=== 2011 ===
The longlist was announced January 27, 2011. The shortlist was announced March 24, 2011. The winners were announced April 29, 2011 at the PEN World Voices Festival by Lorin Stein.

Fiction shortlist

Author	Title	Translator(s)	Language	Publisher
(Finland) Tove Jansson	The True Deceiver; Den ärliga bedragaren	Thomas Teal	Swedish	New York Review
(Argentina) César Aira	The Literary Conference; El congreso de literatura	Katherine Silver	Spanish	New Directions
(Czech Republic) Michal Ajvaz	The Golden Age; Zlatý věk	Andrew Oakland	Czech	Dalkey Archive
(France) Georges-Olivier Châteaureynaud	A Life on Paper	Edward Gauvin	French	Small Beer
(France) Albert Cossery	The Jokers; La violence et la dérision	Anna Moschovakis	French	New York Review
(Germany) Jenny Erpenbeck	Visitation; Heimsuchung	Susan Bernofsky	German	New Directions
(France) Romain Gary (as Émile Ajar)	Hocus Bogus; Pseudo	David Bellos	French	Yale University
(Argentina) Emilio Lascano Tegui	On Elegance While Sleeping; De la elegancia mientras se duerme	Idra Novey	Spanish	Dalkey Archive
(South Africa) Marlene van Niekerk	Agaat	Michiel Heyns	Afrikaans	Tin House
(Austria) Ernst Weiss	Georg Letham: Physician and Murderer; Georg Letham, Arzt und Mörder	Joel Rotenberg	German	Archipelago

Poetry shortlist

Author	Title	Translator(s)	Language	Publisher
(Slovenia) Aleš Šteger	The Book of Things; Knjiga reči	Brian Henry	Slovene	BOA Editions
(France) Eugène Guillevic	Geometries	Richard Sieburth	French	Ugly Duckling
(China) Yu Jian	Flash Cards 便條集	Wang Ping; Ron Padgett	Chinese	Zephyr
(Japan) Ayane Kawata	Time of Sky & Castles in the Air 空の時間 詩集 & 空中楼閣 夢のノート	Sawako Nakayasu	Japanese	Litmus Press
(Albania) Luljeta Lleshanaku	Child of Nature; Fëmijët e natyrës	Henry Israeli; Shpresa Qatipi	Albanian	New Directions

=== 2012 ===
The longlist was announced February 28, 2012. The shortlist was announced April 10, 2012. The winners were announced May 4, 2012.

Fiction shortlist

Author	Title	Translator(s)	Language	Publisher
(Poland) Wiesław Myśliwski	Stone Upon Stone; Kamień na kamieniu	Bill Johnston	Polish	Archipelago
(France) Jean Echenoz	Lightning; Des éclairs	Linda Coverdale	French	New Press
(France) Jacques Jouet	Upstaged; La Scène usurpée	Leland de la Durantaye	French	Dalkey Archive
(Hungary) Dezső Kosztolányi	Kornél Esti; Esti Kornél	Bernard Adams	Hungarian	New Directions
(Haiti) (Canada) Dany Laferrière	I Am a Japanese Writer; Je suis un écrivain japonais	David Homel	French	Douglas & McIntyre
(Italy) Diego Marani	New Finnish Grammar; Nuova grammatica finlandese	Judith Landry	Italian	Dedalus
(Argentina) Juan José Saer	Scars; Cicatrices	Steve Dolph	Spanish	Open Letter
(Brazil) Moacyr Scliar	Kafka's Leopards; Os Leopardos de Kafka	Thomas O. Beebee	Portuguese	Texas Tech University
(Poland) Magdalena Tulli	In Red; W czerwieni	Bill Johnston	Polish	Archipelago
(Spain) Enrique Vila-Matas	Never Any End to Paris; París no se acaba nunca	Anne McLean	Spanish	New Directions

Poetry shortlist

Author	Title	Translator(s)	Language	Publisher
(Japan) Kiwao Nomura	Spectacle & Pigsty	Kyoko Yoshida; Forrest Gander	Japanese	Omnidawn
(Iraq) Amal al-Jubouri	Hagar Before the Occupation, Hagar After the Occupation هاجر قبل الاحتلال، هاجر بعد الاحتلال	Rebecca Gayle Howell; Husam Qaisi	Arabic	Alice James
(France) Jules Laforgue	Last Verses; Derniers vers	Donald Revell	French	Omnidawn
(Russia) Gleb Shulpyakov	A Fireproof Box	Christopher Mattison	Russian	Canarium Books
(Germany) Anja Utler	engulf — enkindle münden — entzüngeln	Kurt Beals	German	Burning Deck
(Germany) Uljana Wolf	False Friends; Falsche Freunde	Susan Bernofsky	German	Ugly Duckling

=== 2013 ===
The longlist was announced March 5, 2013. The shortlist was announced April 10, 2013. The winners were announced May 6, 2013.

Fiction shortlist

Author	Title	Translator(s)	Language	Publisher
(Hungary) László Krasznahorkai	Satantango; Sátántangó	George Szirtes	Hungarian	New Directions
(Argentina) Sergio Chejfec	The Planets; Los planetas	Heather Cleary	Spanish	Open Letter
(France) Éric Chevillard	Prehistoric Times; Préhistoire	Alyson Waters	French	Archipelago
(Iran) Mahmoud Dowlatabadi	The Colonel زوال کلنل	Tom Patterdale	Persian	Melville House
(France) Édouard Levé	Autoportrait	Lorin Stein	French	Dalkey Archive
(Brazil) Clarice Lispector	A Breath of Life: Pulsations; Um Sopro de Vida: Pulsações	Johnny Lorenz	Portuguese	New Directions
(Romania) Herta Müller	The Hunger Angel; Atemschaukel	Philip Boehm	German	Metropolitan Books
(Russia) Mikhail Shishkin	Maidenhair; Венерин волос	Marian Schwartz	Russian	Open Letter
(Djibouti) (France) Abdourahman Waberi	Transit	David Ball; Nicole Ball	French	Indiana University
(Switzerland) Urs Widmer	My Father's Book; Das Buch des Vaters	Donal McLaughlin	German	Seagull

Poetry shortlist

Author	Title	Translator(s)	Language	Publisher
(Romania) Nichita Stănescu	Wheel with a Single Spoke; Roata cu o singură spiță	Sean Cotter	Romanian	Archipelago
(Sweden) Aase Berg	Transfer Fat; Forsla fett	Johannes Göransson	Swedish	Ugly Duckling
(North Macedonia) Lidija Dimkovska	pH Neutral History pH неутрална за животот и смртта	Ljubica Arsovska; Peggy Reid	Macedonian	Copper Canyon
(France) Emmanuel Hocquard	The Invention of Glass; L'Invention du verre	Cole Swensen; Rod Smith	French	Canarium Books
(China) Xi Chuan	Notes on the Mosquito	Lucas Klein	Chinese	New Directions
(Austria) Elfriede Czurda	Almost 1 Book / Almost 1 Life; Fast 1 Leben	Rosmarie Waldrop	German	Burning Deck

=== 2014 ===
The longlist was announced March 11, 2014, the shortlist was announced April 14, 2014. The winners and two runners-up in each category were announced April 28, 2014.

Fiction shortlist, runners-up and winner

Author	Title	Translator(s)	Language	Publisher
(Hungary) László Krasznahorkai	Seiobo There Below; Seiobo járt odalent	Ottilie Mulzet	Hungarian	New Directions
(Japan) Minae Mizumura	A True Novel 本格小説	Juliet Winters	Japanese	Other Press
(Guatemala) Rodrigo Rey Rosa	The African Shore; La orilla africana	Jeffrey Gray	Spanish	Yale University
(Morocco) Mahi Binebine	Horses of God; Les étoiles de Sidi Moumen	Lulu Norman	French	Tin House
(Romania) Mircea Cărtărescu	Blinding; Orbitor	Sean Cotter	Romanian	Archipelago
(Italy) Elena Ferrante	The Story of a New Name; Storia del nuovo cognome	Ann Goldstein	Italian	Europa Editions
(Netherlands) Arnon Grunberg	Tirza	Sam Garrett	Dutch	Open Letter
(Norway) Karl Ove Knausgård	My Struggle: Book Two; Min kamp 2	Don Bartlett	Norwegian	Archipelago
(Lebanon) Ahmad Faris al-Shidyaq	Leg Over Leg الساق على الساق	Humphrey Davies	Arabic	New York University
(Netherlands) J. Slauerhoff	The Forbidden Kingdom; Het verboden rijk	Paul Vincent	Dutch	Pushkin Press

Poetry shortlist, runners-up and winner

Author	Title	Translator(s)	Language	Publisher
(Italy) Elisa Biagini	The Guest in the Wood	Diana Thow; Sarah Stickney; Eugene Ostashevsky	Italian	Chelsea Editions
(France) Claude Royet-Journaud	Four Elemental Bodies	Keith Waldrop	French	Burning Deck
(Iran) Sohrab Sepehri	The Oasis of Now واحه‌ای در لحظ	Kazim Ali; Mohammad Jafar Mahallati	Persian	BOA Editions
(Russia) Polina Barskova (Russia) Anna Glazova (Russia) Maria Stepanova	Relocations: 3 Contemporary Russian Women Poets	Catherine Ciepiela; Anna Khasin; Sibelan Forrester	Russian	Zephyr
(Chile) Roberto Bolaño	The Unknown University; La Universidad Desconocida	Laura Healy	Spanish	New Directions
(Canada) Nicole Brossard	White Piano; Piano blanc	Robert Majzels; Erín Moure	French	Coach House
(France) Danielle Collobert	Murder; Meurtre	Nathanaël	French	Litmus Press
(Argentina) Oliverio Girondo	In the Moremarrow; En la masmédula	Molly Weigel	Spanish	Action Books
(Russia) Anzhelina Polonskaya	Paul Klee's Boat	Andrew Wachtel	Russian	Zephyr
(Taiwan) Ye Mimi	His Days Go By the Way Her Years	Steve Bradbury	Chinese	Anomalous Press

=== 2015 ===
The longlist was announced April 7, 2015. The shortlist was announced May 5, 2015. The winners were announced May 27, 2015.

Fiction shortlist and winner

Author	Title	Translator(s)	Language	Publisher
(China) Can Xue	The Last Lover 最后的情人	Annelise Finegan Wasmoen	Chinese	Yale University
(France) Éric Chevillard	The Author and Me; L'Auteur et moi	Jordan Stump	French	Dalkey Archive
(Argentina) Julio Cortázar	Fantomas Versus the Multinational Vampires; Fantomas contra los vampiros multinacionales	David Kurnick	Spanish	Semiotext(e)
(Russia) Sergei Dovlatov	Pushkin Hills; Заповедник	Katherine Dovlatov	Russian	Counterpoint
(Italy) Elena Ferrante	Those Who Leave and Those Who Stay; Storia di chi fugge e di chi resta	Ann Goldstein	Italian	Europa Editions
(Spain) Medardo Fraile	Things Look Different in the Light; A la luz cambian las cosas	Margaret Jull Costa	Spanish	Pushkin Press
(Czech Republic) Bohumil Hrabal	Harlequin's Millions; Harlekýnovy milióny	Stacey Knecht	Czech	Archipelago
(Finland) Tove Jansson	The Woman Who Borrowed Memories; Kvinnan som lånade minnen	Thomas Teal; Silvester Mazzarella	Swedish	New York Review
(Mexico) Valeria Luiselli	Faces in the Crowd; Los ingrávidos	Christina MacSweeney	Spanish	Coffee House
(Argentina) Juan José Saer	La Grande; La grande	Steve Dolph	Spanish	Open Letter

Poetry shortlist and winner

Author	Title	Translator(s)	Language	Publisher
(Mexico) Rocío Cerón	Diorama	Anna Rosenwong	Spanish	Phoneme Media
(France) Suzanne Doppelt	Lazy Suzie	Cole Swensen	French	Litmus Press
(Lebanon) (France) Vénus Khoury-Ghata	Where Are the Trees Going? Où vont les arbres ?	Marilyn Hacker	French	Curbstone
(Argentina) Alejandra Pizarnik	Diana's Tree; Árbol de Diana	Yvette Siegert	Spanish	Ugly Duckling
(Russia) Lev Rubinstein	Compleat Catalogue of Comedic Novelties	Philip Metres; Tatiana Tulchinsky	Russian	Ugly Duckling
(Germany) Farhad Showghi	End of the City Map; Ende des Stadtplans	Rosmarie Waldrop	German	Burning Deck

=== 2016 ===
The longlist was announced on March 29, 2016. The shortlist was announced April 19, 2016. The winners were announced May 4, 2016.

Fiction shortlist and winner

Author	Title	Translator(s)	Language	Publisher
(Mexico) Yuri Herrera	Signs Preceding the End of the World; Señales que precederán al fin del mundo	Lisa Dillman	Spanish	And Other Stories
(Angola) José Eduardo Agualusa	A General Theory of Oblivion; Teoria Geral do Esquecimento	Daniel Hahn	Portuguese	Archipelago
(Canada) Samuel Archibald	Arvida	Donald Winkler	French	Biblioasis
(Italy) Elena Ferrante	The Story of the Lost Child; Storia della bambina perduta	Ann Goldstein	Italian	Europa Editions
(Bulgaria) Georgi Gospodinov	The Physics of Sorrow; Физика на тъгата	Angela Rodel	Bulgarian	Open Letter
(Israel) Yoel Hoffmann	Moods מצבי רוח	Peter Cole	Hebrew	New Directions
(Brazil) Clarice Lispector	The Complete Stories	Katrina Dodson	Portuguese	New Directions
(Mexico) Valeria Luiselli	The Story of My Teeth; La historia de mis dientes	Christina MacSweeney	Spanish	Coffee House
(Spain) Mercè Rodoreda	War, So Much War; Quanta, quanta guerra…	Maruxa Relaño; Martha Tennent	Catalan	Open Letter
(France) Gabrielle Wittkop	Murder Most Serene; Sérénissime assassinat	Louise Rogers Lalaurie	French	Wakefield

Poetry shortlist and winner

Author	Title	Translator(s)	Language	Publisher
(Brazil) Angélica Freitas	Rilke Shake	Hilary Kaplan	Portuguese	Phoneme Media
(China) Liu Xia	Empty Chairs: Selected Poems	Ming Di	Chinese	Graywolf
(Afghanistan) Various	Load Poems Like Guns: Women's Poetry from Herat, Afghanistan	Farzana Marie	Dari	Holy Cow!
(Argentina) Silvina Ocampo	Silvina Ocampo	Jason Weiss	Spanish	New York Review
(Djibouti) (France) Abdourahman Waberi	The Nomads, My Brothers, Go Out to Drink from the Big Dipper; Les nomades, mes frères, vont boire à la Grande Ourse	Nancy Naomi Carlson	French	Seagull
(China) Yi Lu	Sea Summit 海中的山峰	Fiona Sze-Lorrain	Chinese	Milkweed

=== 2017 ===
The longlist for fiction and poetry was announced March 28, 2017. The shortlist was announced April 19, 2017. The winners were announced May 4, 2017.

Fiction shortlist

Author	Title	Translator(s)	Language	Publisher
(Brazil) Lúcio Cardoso	Chronicle of the Murdered House; Crônica da casa assassinada	Margaret Jull Costa; Robin Patterson	Portuguese	Open Letter
(Mexico) Daniel Saldaña París	Among Strange Victims; En medio de extrañas víctimas	Christina MacSweeney	Spanish	Coffee House
(Senegal) Boubacar Boris Diop	Doomi Golo	Vera Wülfing-Leckie; El Hadji Moustapha Diop	Wolof; French	Michigan State University
(Mauritius) Ananda Devi	Eve Out of Her Ruins; Ève de ses décombres	Jeffrey Zuckerman	French	Deep Vellum
(France) Marie NDiaye	Ladivine	Jordan Stump	French	Alfred A. Knopf
(Russia) Sergei Lebedev	Oblivion; Предел забвения	Antonina W. Bouis	Russian	New Vessel
(Mexico) Laia Jufresa	Umami	Sophie Hughes	Spanish	Oneworld
(Belgium) Stefan Hertmans	War and Turpentine; Oorlog en terpentijn	David McKay	Dutch	Pantheon
(Dominican Republic) Pedro Cabiya	Wicked Weeds; Malas hierbas	Jessica Powell	Spanish	Mandel Vilar
(Argentina) Antonio Di Benedetto	Zama	Esther Allen	Spanish	New York Review

Poetry shortlist

Author	Title	Translator(s)	Language	Publisher
(Argentina) Alejandra Pizarnik	Extracting the Stone of Madness; Extracción de la piedra de locura	Yvette Siegert	Spanish	New Directions
(Hungary) Szilárd Borbély	Berlin-Hamlet	Ottilie Mulzet	Hungarian	New York Review
(Austria) Michael Donhauser	Of Things	Nick Hoff; Andrew Joron	German	Burning Deck
(South Korea) Kim Yi-deum	Cheer Up, Femme Fatale 명랑하라 팜 파탈	Ji Yoon Lee; Don Mee Choi; Johannes Göransson	Korean	Action Books
(Morocco) Abdellatif Laabi	In Praise of Defeat	Donald Nicholson-Smith	French	Archipelago

=== 2018 ===
The longlist for fiction and poetry was announced April 10, 2018. The shortlist was announced May 15, 2018. The winners were announced May 31, 2018.

Fiction shortlist

Author	Title	Translator(s)	Language	Publisher
(Argentina) Rodrigo Fresán	The Invented Part; La parte inventada	Will Vanderhyden	Spanish	Open Letter
(Canada) Anaïs Barbeau-Lavalette	Suzanne; La Femme qui fuit	Rhonda Mullins	French	Coach House
(Iceland) Guðbergur Bergsson	Tómas Jónsson, Bestseller; Tómas Jónsson, metsölubók	Lytton Smith	Icelandic	Open Letter
(France) Mathias Énard	Compass; Boussole	Charlotte Mandell	French	New Directions
(Colombia) Santiago Gamboa	Return to the Dark Valley; Volver al valle oscuro	Howard Curtis	Spanish	Europa Editions
(Germany) Wolfgang Hilbig	Old Rendering Plant; Alte Abdeckerei	Isabel Fargo Cole	German	Two Lines
(Switzerland) Fleur Jaeggy	I Am the Brother of XX; Sono il fratello di XX	Gini Alhadeff	Italian	New Directions
(France) Marie NDiaye	My Heart Hemmed In; Mon cœur à l'étroit	Jordan Stump	French	Two Lines
(Argentina) Romina Paula	August; Agosto	Jennifer Croft	Spanish	Feminist Press
(Taiwan) Wu He	Remains of Life 餘生	Michael Berry	Chinese	Columbia University

Poetry shortlist

Author	Title	Translator(s)	Language	Publisher
(Greece) Eleni Vakalo	Before Lyricism; Πριν απο το λυρισμό	Karen Emmerich	Greek	Ugly Duckling
(Sweden) Aase Berg	Hackers	Johannes Göransson	Swedish	Black Ocean
(Brazil) Wilson Bueno	Paraguayan Sea; Mar paraguayo	Erín Moure	Portunhol; Guarani	Nightboat
(Denmark) Ursula Andkjær Olsen	Third-Millennium Heart; Det 3. årtusindes hjerte	Katrine Øgaard Jensen	Danish	Broken Dimanche
(Japan) Hirato Renkichi	Spiral Staircase	Sho Sugita	Japanese	Ugly Duckling
(Serbia) Ana Ristović	Directions for Use	Steven Teref; Maja Teref	Serbian	Zephyr

=== 2019 ===
The longlist for fiction and poetry was announced April 10, 2019. The shortlist was announced May 15, 2019. The winners were announced May 29, 2019.

Fiction shortlist

Author	Title	Translator(s)	Language	Publisher
(France) Patrick Chamoiseau	Slave Old Man; L'esclave vieil homme et le molosse	Linda Coverdale	French	New Press
(Democratic Republic of the Congo) In Koli Jean Bofane	Congo Inc.: Bismarck's Testament; Congo Inc. : Le testament de Bismarck	Marjolijn de Jager	French	Indiana University
(Morocco) Ahmed Bouanani	The Hospital; L'hôpital	Lara Vergnaud	French	New Directions
(France) Virginie Despentes	Pretty Things; Les jolies choses	Emma Ramadan	French	Feminist Press
(Iran) Shahriar Mandanipour	Moon Brow عقرب‌کِشی	Sara Khalili	Persian	Restless
(Germany) Clemens Meyer	Bricks and Mortar; Im Stein	Katy Derbyshire	German	Fitzcarraldo
(Japan) Sayaka Murata	Convenience Store Woman コンビニ人間	Ginny Tapley Takemori	Japanese	Grove Books
(France) Anne Serre	The Governesses; Les gouvernantes	Mark Hutchinson	French	New Directions
(Iceland) Ófeigur Sigurðsson	Öræfi: The Wasteland; Öræfi	Lytton Smith	Icelandic	Deep Vellum
(Croatia) Dubravka Ugrešić	Fox; Lisica	Ellen Elias-Bursać; David Williams	Croatian	Open Letter

Poetry shortlist

Author	Title	Translator(s)	Language	Publisher
(Brazil) Hilda Hilst	Of Death: Minimal Odes; Da Morte: Odes Mínimas	Laura Cesarco Eglin	Portuguese	co•im•press
(Ivory Coast) Tanella Boni	The Future Has an Appointment with the Dawn; L'avenir a rendez-vous avec l'aube	Todd Fredson	French	University of Nebraska
(Slovenia) Jure Detela	Moss and Silver; Mah in srebro	Raymond Miller; Tatjana Jamnik	Slovene	Ugly Duckling
(South Korea) Kim Hyesoon	Autobiography of Death 죽음의 자서전	Don Mee Choi	Korean	New Directions
(Albania) Luljeta Lleshanaku	Negative Space; Pothuajse dje and Homo Antarcticus	Ani Gjika	Albanian	New Directions

=== 2020 ===
The longlist for fiction and poetry was announced April 1, 2020. The shortlist was announced May 11, 2020. The winners were announced May 29, 2020 in a public Zoom meeting.

Fiction shortlist

Author	Title	Translator(s)	Language	Publisher
(Croatia) Daša Drndić	EEG	Celia Hawkesworth	Croatian	New Directions
(France) Jean-Baptiste Del Amo	Animalia; Règne animal	Frank Wynne	French	Grove Books
(Russia) Vasily Grossman	Stalingrad; За правое дело	Robert Chandler; Elizabeth Chandler	Russian	New York Review
(Argentina) Ariana Harwicz	Die, My Love; Matate, amor	Sara Moses; Carolina Orloff	Spanish	Charco
(Greece) Christos Ikonomou	Good Will Come from the Sea; Το καλό θα 'ρθει από τη θάλασσα	Karen Emmerich	Greek	Archipelago
(Japan) Yōko Ogawa	The Memory Police 密やかな結晶	Stephen Snyder	Japanese	Pantheon
(Argentina) Guillermo Saccomanno	77	Andrea G. Labinger	Spanish	Open Letter
(Italy) Igiaba Scego	Beyond Babylon; Oltre Babilonia	Aaron Robertson	Italian	Two Lines
(Poland) Olga Tokarczuk	Drive Your Plow Over the Bones of the Dead; Prowadź swój pług przez kości umarłych	Antonia Lloyd-Jones	Polish	Riverhead
(Japan) Yūko Tsushima	Territory of Light 光の領分	Geraldine Harcourt	Japanese	Farrar, Straus & Giroux

Poetry shortlist

Author	Title	Translator(s)	Language	Publisher
(Lebanon) Etel Adnan	Time	Sarah Riggs	French	Nightboat Books
(Israel) Shimon Adaf	Aviva-No אביבה־לא	Yael Segalovitz	Hebrew	Alice James
(Uruguay) Amanda Berenguer	Materia Prima; Materia prima	Gillian Brassil; Anna Deeny Morales; Mónica de la Torre; Urayoán Noel; Jeannine Marie Pitas; Kristin Dykstra; Kent Johnson; Alex Verdolini	Spanish	Ugly Duckling
(France) Stéphane Bouquet	Next Loves; Les amours suivants	Lindsay Turner	French	Nightboat Books
(Spain) Lupe Gómez	Camouflage; Camuflaxe	Erín Moure	Galician	Circumference Books

=== 2021-present ===
The award went on hiatus in 2021.
