= Désiré Nisard =

French author and literary critic (1806–1888)

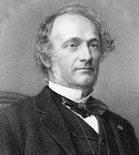
- Born: 20 March 1806; Châtillon-sur-Seine, France
- Died: 27 March 1888 (aged 82); San Remo, Italy

Jean Marie Napoléon Désiré Nisard (20 March 1806 – 27 March 1888) was a French writer and literary critic. He was born at Châtillon-sur-Seine.

== Career ==
In 1826 he joined the staff of the Journal des Débats, but subsequently transferred his pen to the National. Under the empire he was inspector-general of education (1852) and director of the École normal (1857–1867).

Nisard's literary reputation was established by his Histoire de la littérature française (1844–1861). This work helped to secure his election to the Académie Française in 1850 as seat 39. His other works include Études d'histoire et de littérature (1859–1864), and Les Quatres grands historiens latins (1875).

In all his books Nisard vigorously supported the claims of classicism against romanticism. He is the object of the loathing of the narrator in the postmodern book Démolir Nisard, by the French writer Eric Chevillard.

== Death ==
Nisard died at San Remo in 1888.

== Memorials ==
The school Lycée polyvalent Désiré Nisard in Châtillon-sur-Seine was named after Nisard.
