= The Book of Reykjavík =

2021 anthology of stories about Shanghai

The Book of Reykjavík is an anthology of ten stories from various icelandic writers, edited by Vera Júlíusdóttir as well as Becca Parkinson and published on 11 November 2021. It is the twenty-first book of the Reading the City series, focused on stories from and about a certain city, in this case Reykjavík in Iceland.

== Content ==
- Vorwort von Sjón
- Introduction by Vera Juiusdottir
- Island by Fridgeir Einarsson, translated by Larissa Kyzer
- The Gardeners by Einar Már Guðmundsson, translated by Lytton Smith
- Keep Sleeping, My Love by Andri Snær Magnason, translated by Lytton Smith
- Home by Fríða Ísberg, translated by Larissa Kyzer
- Two Foxes by Bjorn Halldorsson, translated by Larissa Kyzer
- Without You, I'm Half by Kristin Eiriksdottir, translated by Larissa Kyzer
- Reykjavik Nights by Auður Jónsdóttir, translated by Meg Matich
- Incursion by Þórarinn Eldjárn, translated by Philip Roughton
- When His Eyes are on You, You’re the Virgin Mary by Guðrún Eva Mínervudóttir, translated by Meg Matich
- The Dead are Here With Us at Christmas by Agust Borgbor Sverrisson, translated by Lytton Smith
- About the authors
- About the translators

== Background ==
In 2011, Reykjavík was declared the fifth City of Literature by the UN.

== Review ==
Paul Simon wrote for Morning Star, that "the sharp and sparse writing [...] places Reykjavík at the unsteady centre of a number of overlapping contradictions." European Literature Network wrote, the anthology shows Reykjavík to be a "frontier town only just starting to get used to the fact that it has its own gravitational pull."
