= Alina Bronsky =

Russian-born German writer (born 1978)

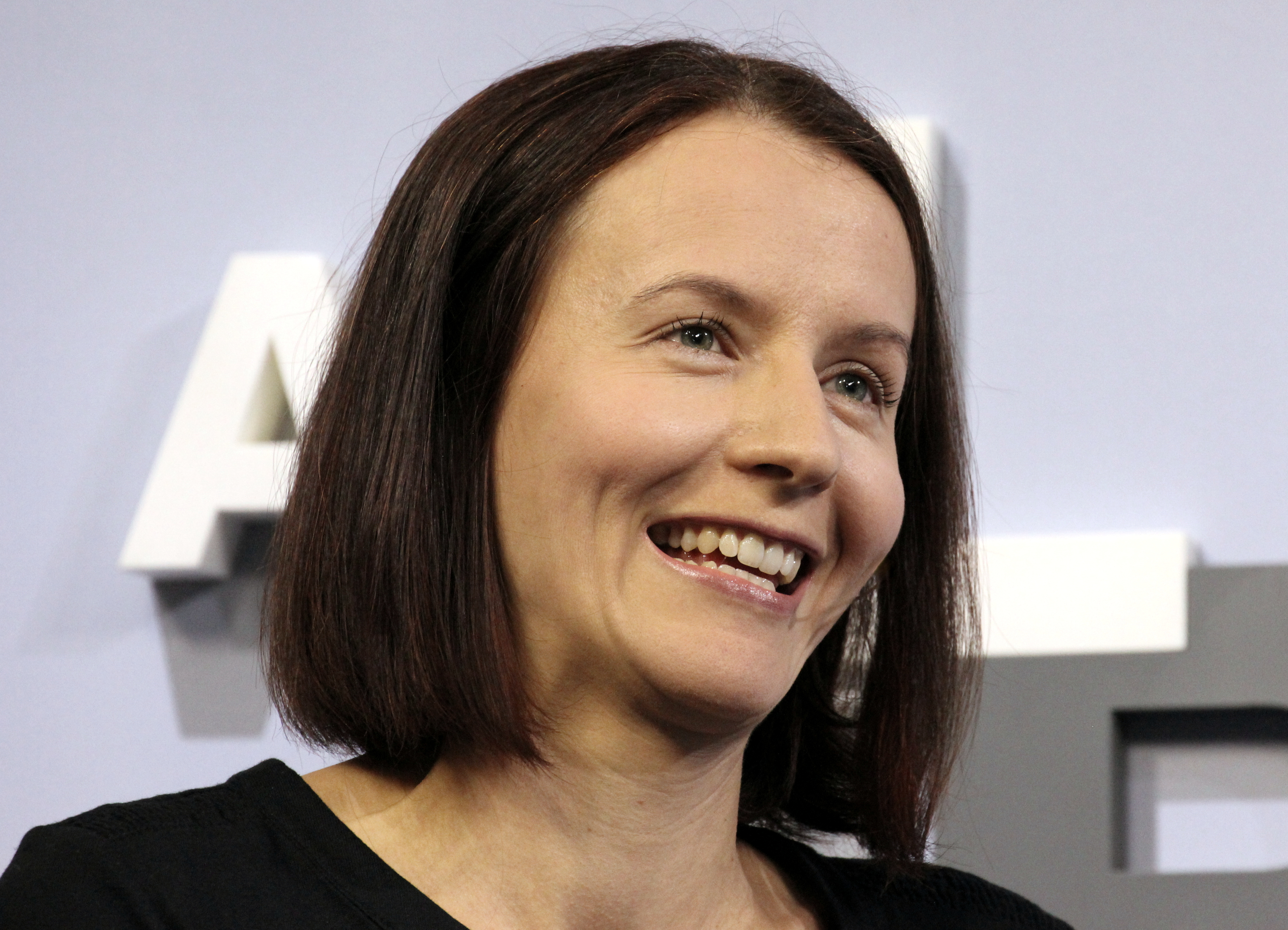
- Born: 2 December 1978 (age 47); Yekaterinburg, Russian SFSR, Soviet Union
- Writing career
- Language: German

Alina Bronsky (a pseudonym) is a Russian-born German writer. Her books have been published in more than 15 countries, including the US and Italy, in both print and audio formats. Her debut novel Scherbenpark (2008), or Broken Glass Park (2010), has received wide critical acclaim.

== Life ==
Bronsky was born on 2 December 1978 in Yekaterinburg, Soviet Russia, an industrial town at the foot of the Ural Mountains in central Russia, and spent her childhood in Marburg and Darmstadt. After dropping out of medical school, Bronsky worked as an advertising copywriter and in newspaper editing. Alina Bronsky is widowed and lives with her boyfriend, the actor Ulrich Noethen, in Berlin. She has three children from her first marriage and, since August 2013, a daughter with Noethen. Bronsky has said that she sees herself as two separate people: the German-speaking self deals with her professional and occupational matters, while the Russian-speaking self deals with family and emotional matters. She established a pen name to facilitate this persona. Her family is of mixed origin, including German-Jewish roots.

== Major works ==
Alina Bronsky's works have been managed by the well-known Frankfurt literary agent Georg Simader; her current lector is Olaf Petersenn. By the time she had finished her first novel, she sent an email to three lecturers, of which all three subsequently requested the manuscript. Two of them finally agreed on a publication.

The first written novel by Bronsky was Scherbenpark, also known as Broken Glass Park, which tells a story about a seventeen-year-old girl named Sascha Naimann who struggles to adapt to her new life after the murder of her mother and moving from Russia to Germany. Sascha battles with the importance of taking care of her siblings and getting revenge on her mother's murderer. Bronsky's debut novel Broken Glass Park (Europa, 2010) was described by the Boston Globe as "a vivid description of contemporary adolescence under pressure." Broken Glass Park was nominated for the prestigious Ingeborg Bachmann Award in 2008 and for the German Young Adult Literary Prize in 2009. The novel was adapted into a movie starring Jasna Fritzi Bauer. The recognition gained from Bronsky's debut novel paved the way for her second novel.

Following the success of Broken Glass Park, Bronsky's The Hottest Dishes of the Tartar Cuisine (Europa, 2011) was long-listed for the German Book Prize in 2010, named a favourite read of 2011 by The Wall Street Journal and The Huffington Post, and was selected as one of Publishers Weekly's Ten Best Books of the Year. Described as "mordantly funny" by the San Francisco Chronicle, The Hottest Dishes of the Tartar Cuisine is the story of three unforgettable women whose destinies are tangled up in a family dynamic that is at turns hilarious and tragic. Alina Bronsky's third novel Just Call Me Superhero, which tells the story of a young man's complicated relationship with the members of a support group he has joined following an accident, was published by Europa Editions in the fall of 2014. The Boston Globe refers to it as "a story of redemption, and of learning, slowly, to be comfortable in one’s own skin." Her young adult novels "Spiegelkind" and "Spiegelriss" belong to the mystery-adventure genre. As part of a coming-of-age trilogy, the novels centre the 15-year-old protagonist's dangerous search for her missing mother and the discovery of the world of the mysterious "Phees".

"Baba Dunja's Last Love", her most recent novel, follows the main character Baba Dunja through her experiences after returning from the nuclear disaster in Tschernobyl. Baba Dunja copes with her situation by writing letters to her daughter and spending her days in a peaceful and rural area, where she grows her own vegetables and engages in new social relationships.

== Major themes ==
The characteristics of Bronsky's prose have led many critics to assign her to the literary group of the “Eastern turn” in German literature, succeeding what has sometimes been called “Turkish turn” – a literature distinctively concerned with "a vibrant, internationalized German literature gaining new impetus from reconnecting with its eastern neighbours after the divisions of the Cold War." Although migration experience and coming-of-age are not her only focus points, Bronsky is said to be part of this phenomenon, favouring the "double perspective, conditioned by their experiences of historical change in their old homelands and the search for identity in the new". Having experienced residing life in a small, peripheral community, suffering from economic disadvantage, cultural displacement, and linguistic marginalization, herself, she admits to partially draw on her own experiences.

== Literary style ==
Bronsky's writing has been described as imbued "with a gritty authenticity and unputdownable propulsion," and the Daily Beast calls her "an exciting new voice in the literary world."

However, due to her play with clichés and her characteristically clear and descriptive language used to form credible figures, some theorists introduced the accusation to be too easily consumable, to write in a rather pop-literary way. However, the German daily newspaper FAZ (Frankfurtrer Allgemeine Zeitung) praised her debut for the breathless “staccato”, the “Bronsky-Beat”, which pushes the reader through the plot, making the protagonist’ development so believable and psychologically conceivable despite the simple language, establishing a ruthless and shrewd portrait of the parallel world of repatriates settlement, of which yet was too little reported. In a similar manner, the German Book Award Jury justified its decision to nominee her for the German Book Award in 2008 because the first-person-narrator in Broken Glass Park tells typically irreverent for a teen, full of rage and humour, clever, cool, and heated at the same time. They praised her prose as “impressively clear and uncompromising, with dense images and a distant view of Sasha's fate". In doing so, Bronsky, according to the jury, demonstrates how the encounters with people of hypocrisy and forlornness contribute to finding one's own life. Many critics agree on her distinct presentation of “strong characterizations”, going hand in hand with “slowly unveiling plot twists”, which finally leads to the revealing of an “enigmatic conclusion that hints at the mystical”. She describes her works as being concerned with what may be wrapped up as a study of a very typical sort of personal crisis, one of “leaving their secure home and going somewhere else. The same feelings which everybody knows - growing up, leaving your home, being alone, settling down, question of identity and love - they're all concentrated in immigration experience. And that's how I explain this phenomenon of interest.”. As most of her stories are set in Germany, her characters are partially described as doing “an exercise in solipsistic Weltschmerz”.

== Awards/nominations ==
- Longlist German Book Award 2010: Die schärfsten Gerichte der tatarischen Küche
- Longlist German Book Award 2015: Baba Dunjas letzte Liebe
- Nominated for the German Children's Literature Award in 2009 (Category: Youth literature)
- Nominated for the Aspekte-Literaturpreis in 2009
- Broken Glass Park was nominated for the Ingeborg Bachmann Preis 2008 and an excerpt was read at the actual Wettbewerb um den Literaturpreis im Rahmen der Tage der deutschsprachigen Literatur

== Works ==
- Scherbenpark. Roman, Kiepenheuer & Witsch, Köln 2008, ISBN 978-3-462-04030-2. (Auch als Hörbuch, ISBN 978-3-86610-560-7)
- Broken Glass Park. Transl. by Tim Mohr. Europa Editions, New York. (March 30, 2010), ISBN 978-1-93337-296-9
- Die schärfsten Gerichte der tatarischen Küche. Roman, Kiepenheuer & Witsch, Köln 2010, ISBN 978-3-462-04235-1
- The Hottest Dishes of the Tartar Cuisine. Transl. by Tim Mohr. Europa Editions, New York. (April 26, 2011), ISBN 978-1-60945-006-9
- Spiegelkind. Jugendbuch, Arena Verlag, Würzburg 2012, ISBN 978-3-401067988
- Just Call Me Superhero. Transl. by Tim Mohr. Europa Editions, New York. (November 4, 2014), ISBN 978-1-60945-229-2
- Baba Dunjas letzte Liebe. Köln : Kiepenheuer & Witsch, 2015, 1. Aufl.
- Und du kommst auch drin vor. Roman. dtv, München 2017, ISBN 978-3-423-76181-9.
- Nenn mich einfach Superheld. Köln : Kiepenheuer & Witsch, 2015, 1. Aufl.
- Ditja zerkala: Moskva : Clever Izdat., 2014, Literaturno-chudožestvennoe izd.
- Just call me superhero. New York : Europa Ed., 2014
- Mein Bruder soll nicht Pepsi heißen. Frankfurt, M. : Hansisches Dr.- und Verl.-Haus, 2014
- Najljuća jela Tatarske kuhinje. Zagreb : Nakl. Ljevak, 2014.
- Outcast. Milano : Corbaccio, 2014.
- Rozbité zrcadlo. Praha : CooBoo, 2014, 1. vyd.
- Sasja's wraak. Breda : Geus, 2014
- Scherbenpark. – Stuttgart : Klett Sprachen [Mehrteiliges Werk] Teil: [Hauptbd.]., 2014.
- Scherbenpark. Münster : Spaß-am-Lesen-Verl., 2014
- Spiegelkind. Würzburg : Arena, 2014, 1. Aufl. als Sonderausg. V
- Cam kırıkları parkı. Kadıköy, İstanbul : İthaki, 2013, 1. Baskı
- Spiegelriss. Würzburg : Arena, 2013, 1. Aufl.
- Cuisine tatare et descendance. Arles : Actes Sud, 2012, 1. éd.
- De allerbeste oma van de wereld en de beste moeder, echtgenote, gastvrouw en mooiste vrouw óóit (volgens haarzelf). Breda : Geus, 2012
- I piatti più piccanti della cucina tatara. Roma : Ed. eo, 2011
- Los platos más picantes de la cocina tártara. Madrid : Ed. Siruela, 2011
- Nejostřejší pokrmy tatarské kuchyně. Bronsky, Alina. – Brno : Jota, 2011, Vyd.
- Park rozbitków. Torún : C & T, 2011, Wyd. 1
- Parḳ ha-resisim. Or Yehudah : Kineret, 2011
- Sascha. Buenos Aires : Blatt & Rios, 2011
- The hottest dishes of the Tartar cuisine. New York, NY : Europa Ed., 2011
- Broken glass park. New York, NY : Europa Ed., 2010
- La vendetta di Sasha. Roma : Ed. eo, 2010
