= Literaturpreis der Universitätsstadt Marburg und des Landkreises Marburg-Biedenkopf =

German literary award

Literaturpreis der Universitätsstadt Marburg und des Landkreises Marburg-Biedenkopf was a literary prize of Hesse. The prize was awarded from 1980 to 2005.

== Winners ==
- 2005
  - Antje Rávic Strubel (Berlin) (Roman Tupolew 134) Hauptpreisträgerin 7.500 €
  - Jan Kuhl (Gießen) (Kinderbuch König Fittipaldi und das Zauberkissen) Regiopreis 2.500 €
- 2002
  - Thomas Lang (München) (Roman Than) – Hauptpreisträger 10.000 €
  - Markus Orths (Karlsruhe) (Roman Corpus) – Förderpreis 5.000 €
- 2000
  - Sibylle Berg (Zürich) (Roman Amerika)
  - Kathrin Groß-Striffler (Isling) (Erzählband Unterholz) – beide Hauptpreisträgerinnen je 13.000 DM
  - Tobias Grüterich (Dresden) (Löss. Aphorismen) Förderpreis 4.000 DM
- 1998
  - Dorothea Dieckmann (Hamburg) (die schwere und die leichte Liebe)
  - Matthias Altenburg (Frankfurt/M) (Landschaft mit Wölfen) – Hauptpreisträger je 15.000,00 DM
- 1996
  - Anne Duden (Berlin)
  - Ilija Trojanow (München) – beide Hauptpreisträger je 12.500,00 DM
  - Hans Wolf (Baden-Baden) – Übersetzerpreis: 10.000,00 DM
- 1994
  - Robert Menasse (Wien)
  - Reinhard Jirgl (Berlin) – beide Hauptpreisträger je 12.500,00 DM
  - Ilse und Günter Ohnemus (München) – Übersetzerpreis: 10.000,00 DM
- 1992
  - Durs Grünbein (Berlin) – Hauptpreisträger
  - Robert Schindel (Wien) – Förderpreis
  - Eckhard Thiele (Berlin) – Übersetzerpreis
- 1990
  - Helga M. Novak (Berlin) – Hauptpreisträgerin
  - Josef Guggenmos (Irsee) – Förderpreis
  - Jürgen K. Hultenreich (Berlin) – Förderpreis
  - Lutz Rathenow (Berlin) – Förderpreis
- 1988
  - James Krüss – Hauptpreisträger
  - Margrit Irgang (München) – Förderpreis
  - Ror Wolf (Wiesbaden) – Förderpreis
  - Johanna und Günter Braun (Magdeburg) – Förderpreis
- 1986
  - Hans Joachim Schädlich (Berlin) – Hauptpreisträger
  - Dante Andrea Franzetti (Schweiz) – Förderpreis
  - Christa Moog (Berlin) – Förderpreis
  - Ernest Wichner (Berlin) – Förderpreis
- 1984
  - Erich Loest (Osnabrück) – Hauptpreisträger
  - Bettina Blumenberg (München) – Förderpreis
  - Klaus Hensel (Frankfurt/M) – Förderpreis
  - Joseph Zoderer (Terenten/Südtirol) – Förderpreis
- 1982
  - Ludwig Harig (15.000 DM)
  - Hans Georg Bulla (7.500 DM)
  - Jürgen Fuchs (7.500 DM)
  - Tezer Kiral (7.500 DM)
- 1980
  - Harald Kaas (München) – Hauptpreis 12.000 DM
  - Oskar Pastior (Berlin)
  - Gert Jonke
  - Elfriede Czurda
  - Rosemarie Schering – Förderpreise je 6.000 DM
