= Dorothea Dieckmann =

German writer

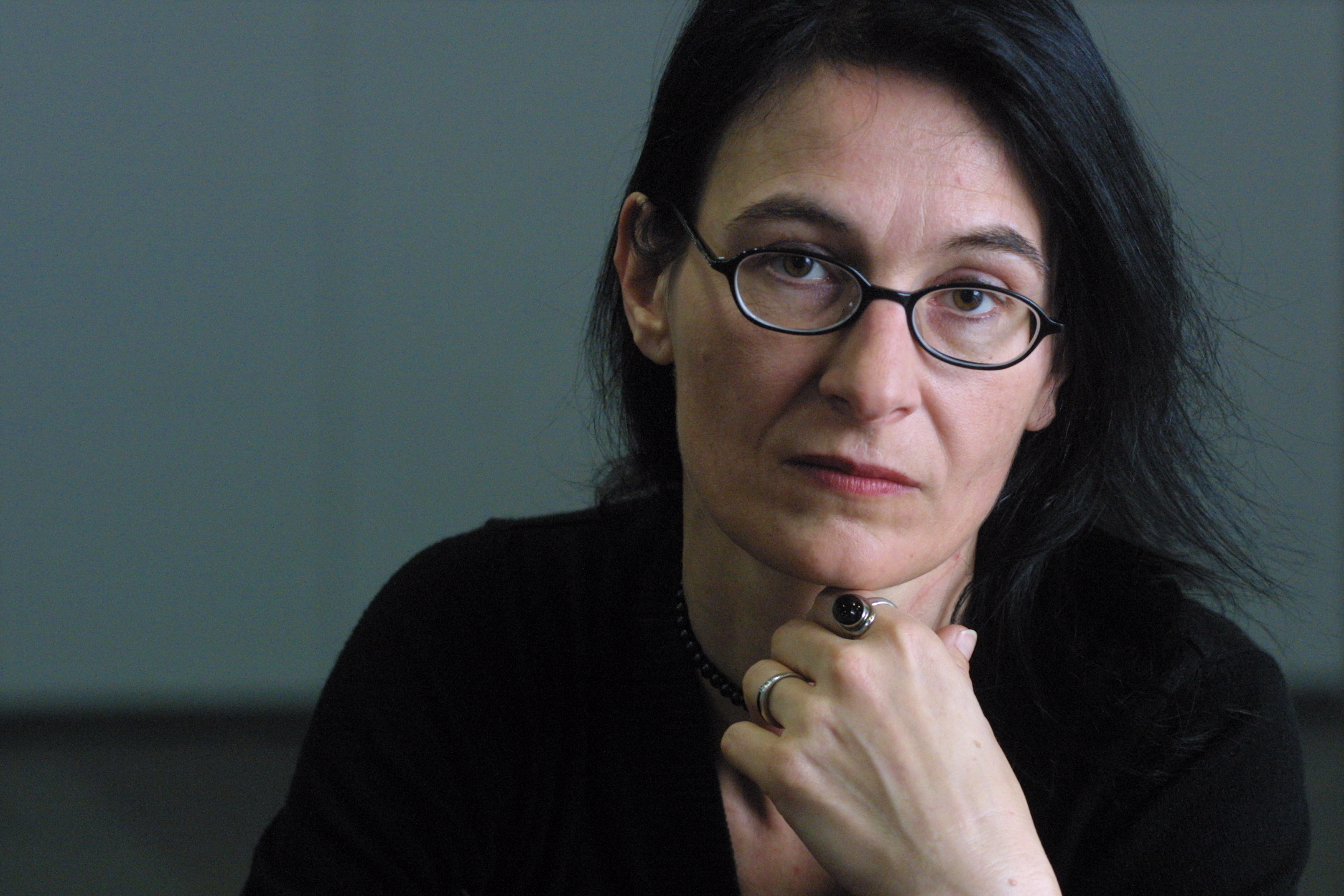
- Born: 1957 (age 68–69); Freiburg
- Occupations: Writer, teacher

Dorothea Dieckmann is a German writer.

== Biography ==
Dorothea Dieckmann was born in Freiburg in 1957. She has lived in Hamburg, Cologne, Rome, Tübingen, and Stuttgart. Prior to becoming a full-time writer Dieckmann worked as a high school teacher.

Her novel Guantanamo was her first to be translated into English. When Tim Mohr translated the novel into English, she won the Best Translated Book Award.

== Awards and honours ==
She is a recipient of the 1990 Literature Prize of the City of Hamburg. In 1997, she received the Künstlerhaus Schloss Wiepersdorf scholarship. In 1998, she received the Marburger Literaturpreis. In 2004, she received a scholarship from Ledig House. In 2009, she was chosen to be Dresden's writer in residence.
