= Gert Jonke =

Austrian poet, playwright and novelist (1946–2009)

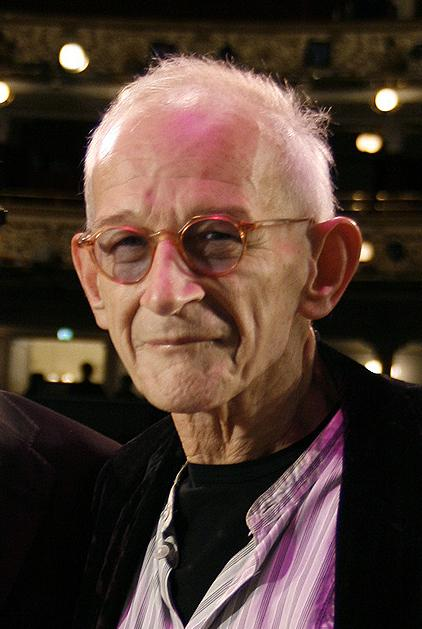
Gert Jonke in 2008

Gert Friedrich Jonke (8 February 1946 – 4 January 2009) was an Austrian poet, playwright and novelist.

== Life ==
Gert Jonke was born and educated in Klagenfurt, Austria. He attended the Gymnasium (university preparatory school) and the Conservatory. After he served his mandatory military service, he continued his studies at the College of Music and Representative Art in Vienna in the Film and Television Department. He did not, however, complete his studies there, nor his studies of History, Philosophy, Music Theory, or German Studies at the University of Vienna which followed.

He became friends with the writers' circle of Graz, a centre of the Austrian literary avant garde of the time. In 1969 he published his first novel, Geometrischer Heimatroman (Geometric Regional Novel), which met with some success. The book received a positive review by Peter Handke in Der Spiegel. Andreas Dorschel praised Jonke's "dark humor" and his "sensual, witty and poetic playfulness".

In 1971 Jonke received a scholarship to study in West Berlin, where he stayed for five years. He then lived for a year in London, followed by extensive travels throughout the Middle East and South America. In 1977, he moved with his partner to Argentina, where he met Borges. He returned to Austria in the 1980s.

Jonke died of cancer at the age of 62 on 4 January 2009, in Vienna. He was given a grave of honor (German: Ehrengrab) in the Zentralfriedhof, the central cemetery in Vienna.

== Works ==
=== Prose ===
- Geometrischer Heimatroman (1969). Geometric Regional Novel, trans. Johannes W. Vazulik (Dalkey Archive, 1994)
- Beginn einer Verzweiflung: Epiloge (1970, short stories). The Beginnings of a Despair: Epilogues
- Musikgeschichte (1970, short stories). Music History
- Glashausbesichtigung (1970). A Tour of Glass Houses
- Die Vermehrung der Leuchttürme (1971). The Multiplication of the Lighthouses
- Schule der Geläufigkeit: Erzählungen (1977). Homage to Czerny: Studies in Virtuoso Technique, trans. Jean M. Snook (Dalkey Archive, 2008)
- Der ferne Klang (1979). The Distant Sound, trans. Jean M. Snook (Dalkey Archive, 2010)
- Die erste Reise zum unerforschten Grund des stillen Horizonts (1980). Collection of revised versions of works written between 1965 and 1980: "Wiederholung des Festes"; Das System von Wien; Geometrischer Heimatroman; Glashausbesichtigung; Die Hinterhältigkeit der Windmaschinen; and Die Vermehrung der Leuchttürme
- Erwachen zum großen Schlafkrieg (1982). Awakening to the Great Sleep War, trans. Jean M. Snook (Dalkey Archive, 2012)
- Der Kopf des Georg Friedrich Händel (1988). The Head of George Frederick Handel, included in the English-language compilation Blinding Moment
- Stoffgewitter (1996). Thunderbolts of Cloth. Includes the novella Geblendeter Augenblick: Anton Weberns Tod (Blinding Moment) and the autobiographical essay "Individuum und Metamorphose".
- Himmelstraße – Erdbrustplatz oder Das System von Wien (1999). The System of Vienna: From Heaven Street to Earth Mound Square, trans. Vincent Kling (Dalkey Archive, 2009)
  - Reworked stories from Musikgeschichte (1970), Beginn einer Verzweiflung (1970) and Das System von Wien

=== Plays and poems ===
- Damals vor Graz, Forum Stadtpark Graz 1989
- Die Hinterhältigkeit der Windmaschinen: Tragodie in drei Akten (1971). The Deviousness of the Wind Machines
- Im Inland und im Ausland auch (1974). At Home as Well as Abroad: Poems, Radio Plays, Theatrical Plays
- Sanftwut oder Der Ohrenmaschinist: Eine Theatersonate (Gentle Rage, or The Ear Machinist), Styriarte Graz 1990
  - First performance in Sign Language with the deaf actor Werner Mössler by ARBOS - Company for Music and Theatre Vienna 2006
- Opus 111: Ein Klavierstuck, Volkstheater Vienna 1993
- Gegenwart der Erinnerung (Memory at Present), Volkstheater Vienna 1995
- Es singen die Steine: ein Stück Naturtheater (The Stones Are Singing: A Piece of Nature Theater), Stadttheater Klagenfurt 1998
- Insektarium, Volkstheater Vienna 1999, published 2001
- Die Vögel, UA Volkstheater Wien 2002
- Chorphantasie: Konzert fur Dirigent auf der Suche nach dem Orchester, Schauspielhaus Graz, 2003
- Redner rund um die Uhr: Eine Sprechsonate (Orator Around the Clock: A Spoken Sonata), Semper-Depot Vienna, 2004
- Seltsame Sache: Ein Melodram für Lorenzo da Ponte, Ruhrtriennale, 2005
- Die versunkene Kathedrale, Burgtheater Vienna 2005
- Freier Fall, UA Akademietheater Vienna 2008
- Bursting Suddenly, aktionstheater ensemble at the Festspielhaus Bregenz and Semper Depot Vienna 2008
- Alle Stücke (2008)
- Alle Gedichte (2010)

=== Other works ===
- Schwarzbuch (1984). Photos by Sepp Schmölzer, text by Jonke.
- Das Verhalten auf sinkenden Schiffen (1997). Text of a speech by Ilse Aichinger with response from Jonke.
- Klagenfurt: Ansichten in klassischen Schwarzweiß-Fotografien (2004). Photos by Siegfried Gutzelnig, text by Jonke.

=== Compilations in English ===
- Blinding Moment: Four Pieces About Composers, trans. Vincent Kling (Ariadne Press, 2009). Includes:
  - The Head of George Frederick Handel
  - "Catalogue d'oiseaux"
  - Gentle Rage, or The Ear Machinist
  - Blinding Moment

== Awards and honors ==
- 1977 Ingeborg Bachmann Prize
- 1980 Literature Prize of the University City of Marburg
- 1984 Manuscripts prize of Styria
- 1987 Austrian Prize for Literature
- 1988 Prize of the Frankfurt Authors Foundation
- 1990–1993 Robert Musil scholarship
- 1991 International Bodensee-Culture Prize
- 1993 Merit Award of the City of Vienna
- 1994 Anton Wildgans Prize
- 1997 Erich Fried Prize
- 1997 Franz Kafka Literature Prize of the city of Klosterneuburg
- 1998 Berlin Literature Prize
- 2001 Grand Austrian State Prize for Literature
- 2003 Nestroy Theatre Prize Best Author for Chorphantasie
- 2005 Kleist Prize
- 2006 Arthur Schnitzler Prize
- 2006 Nestroy Theatre Prize Best Author for Die versunkene Kathedrale (The Sunken Cathedral)
- 2008 Nestroy Theatre Prize Best Author for Free Fall
