= The Necrophiliac =

1972 novel by Gabrielle Wittkop

- First edition cover
- Author: Gabrielle Wittkop
- Original title: Le Nécrophile
- Translator: Don Bapst
- Language: French
- Genre: Erotic fiction; transgressive fiction
- Publisher: Régine Deforges
- Publication date: 1972
- Publication place: France
- English publication date: 2011
- Media type: Print
- Pages: 167
- OCLC: 463479889
- Dewey Decimal: 843/.914
- LC Class: PQ2683.I82 N4

The Necrophiliac (French: Le Nécrophile) is the debut novel of French writer Gabrielle Wittkop (1920–2002), written in 1972. A transgressive, epistolary novel in the form of a diary, it follows the life of Parisian necrophile, Lucien N. The middle-aged antique dealer who appears normal to the outside world, but lives a secret life at night, searching for corpses to satisfy his macabre fetish, digging up bodies from Montparnasse Cemetery to the catacombs of Naples. The novel was translated into English in 2011, by Don Bapst.

== Reception ==
Nicholas Lezard, writing for The Guardian, wrote "This would be a poor and revolting little book...if it did not have such a poised tone and sensibility, such intelligence, behind it...This is a masterpiece." Publishers Weekly gave a negative review, writing "While the material is inarguably gruesome, it's not especially smart or alarming, though it may hold some appeal to the young and disaffected who haven't yet been turned on to the marquis de Sade."
