= Slave Old Man =

2018 translation of Esclave Vieil Homme Et Le Molosse, by Linda Coverdale

- Author: Patrick Chamoiseau
- Translator: Linda Coverdale
- Language: French and French Creole
- Genre: Historical Fiction
- Publisher: The New Press (English version)
- Publication date: 1997
- Publication place: France
- English publication date: 2018
- Media type: Print (Paperback)
- Pages: 176

Slave Old Man (French: L'Esclave vieil homme et le molosse, lit. 'The Old Slave and the Hound') is a 1997 novella by Patrick Chamoiseau. This novel is a part of the literary Créolité movement, created by Francophone authors Patrick Chamoiseau, Jean Bernabé, and Raphaël Confiant during the 1980s. In 2018, an English translation by Linda Coverdale was published and won the 2019 Best Translated Book Award.

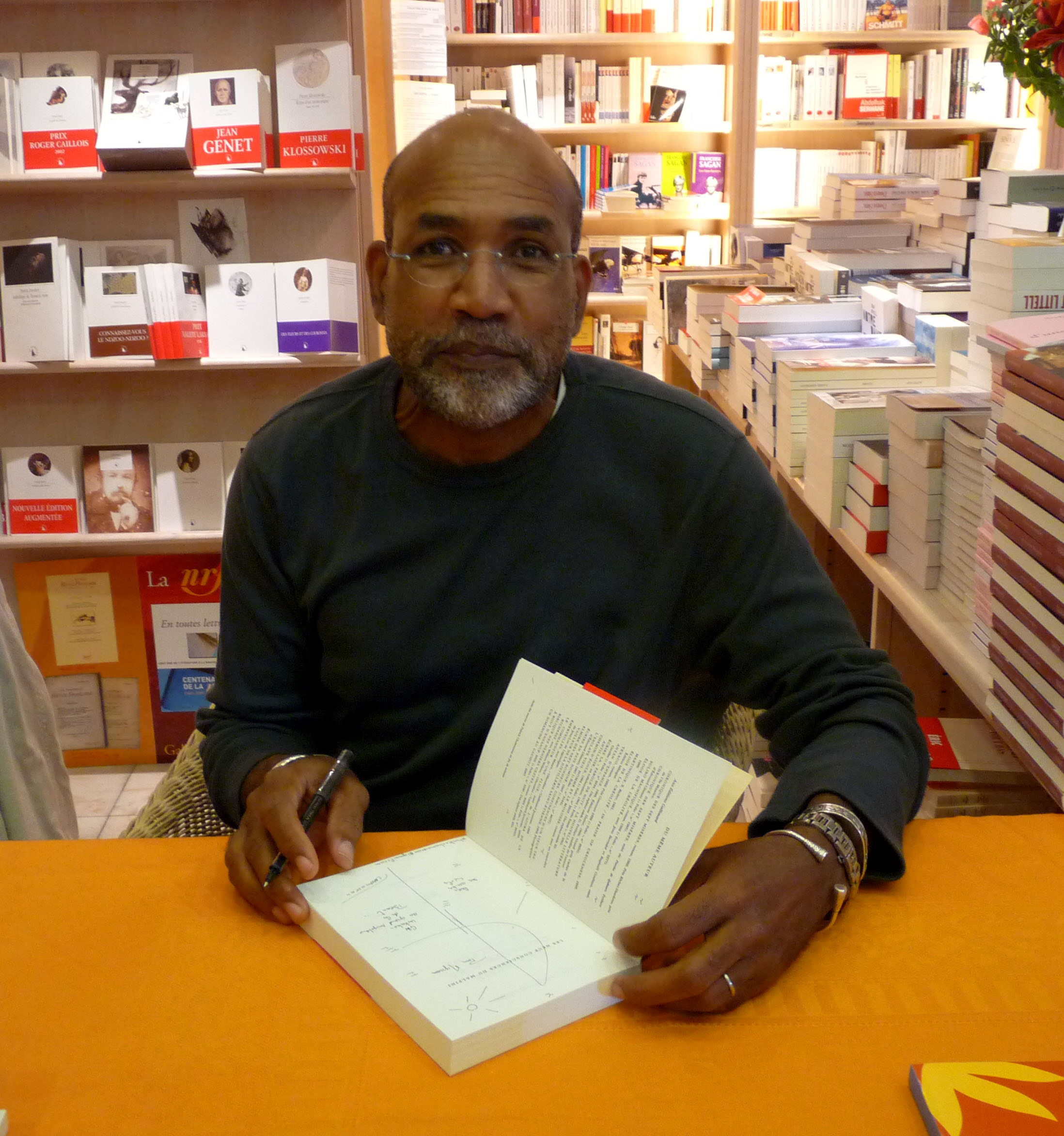
Patrick Chamoiseau

== Summary ==
The narrator claims to have transcribed an oral history of an old slave man who escapes a sugarcane plantation on the island of Martinique. The old slave is docile and obedient, but when he locks eyes with his master's mastiff in its kennel, his need for freedom is unleashed. He leaves the plantation, running through the night and losing all feeling and sense of self in the Great Woods as he is pursued by the master and his mastiff. At daybreak, the old man covers his eyes from the harsh sun with a blindfold. As he journeys through the woods, he feels as though he is one with nature, but fear and exhaustion soon provoke hallucinations. As he removes his blindfold, he recovers his immense spirit and discovers his will for independence. On the course of his journey, the old man encounters a snake, survives a watery sinkhole, and fights off crabs. Tired of running from the relentless mastiff, the old man opts to turn and fight instead. The dog falls into a spring and the old man breaks his leg. The old slave dies and the novel concludes with an archaeologist's examination of the old slave man's bones.

=== Structure ===
The novel is divided into seven chapters with names that reference Nature: Matter, Alive, Waters, Lunar, Solar, The Stone, and The Bones. Each of these chapters also begins with an epigraph from the Martiniquan writer Édouard Glissant. As the book progresses, the narrative shifts from third to the first person voice of the old man. Several sections show the perspective of the master and of the mastiff. Notable characteristics of the author's writing style include terse, choppy sentences, detailed metaphors, and uneven chapter length. The story is told without the use of dialogue. Internal monologue exhibits emotional tension.

== Characters ==
=== Protagonist ===
The protagonist, the old slave, is not named within the text. He is, however, referenced by the nickname "Fafa" because of his job of making syrup. Most of his life has been spent enslaved on the plantation. Because of his obedience and wisdom he is respected among the slaves and by the master, but he does not participate in the slaves' social traditions. Nor does he exhibit emotion. The protagonist's repressed spirit finds its will released when he, as a runaway slave, attempts to escape the plantation.

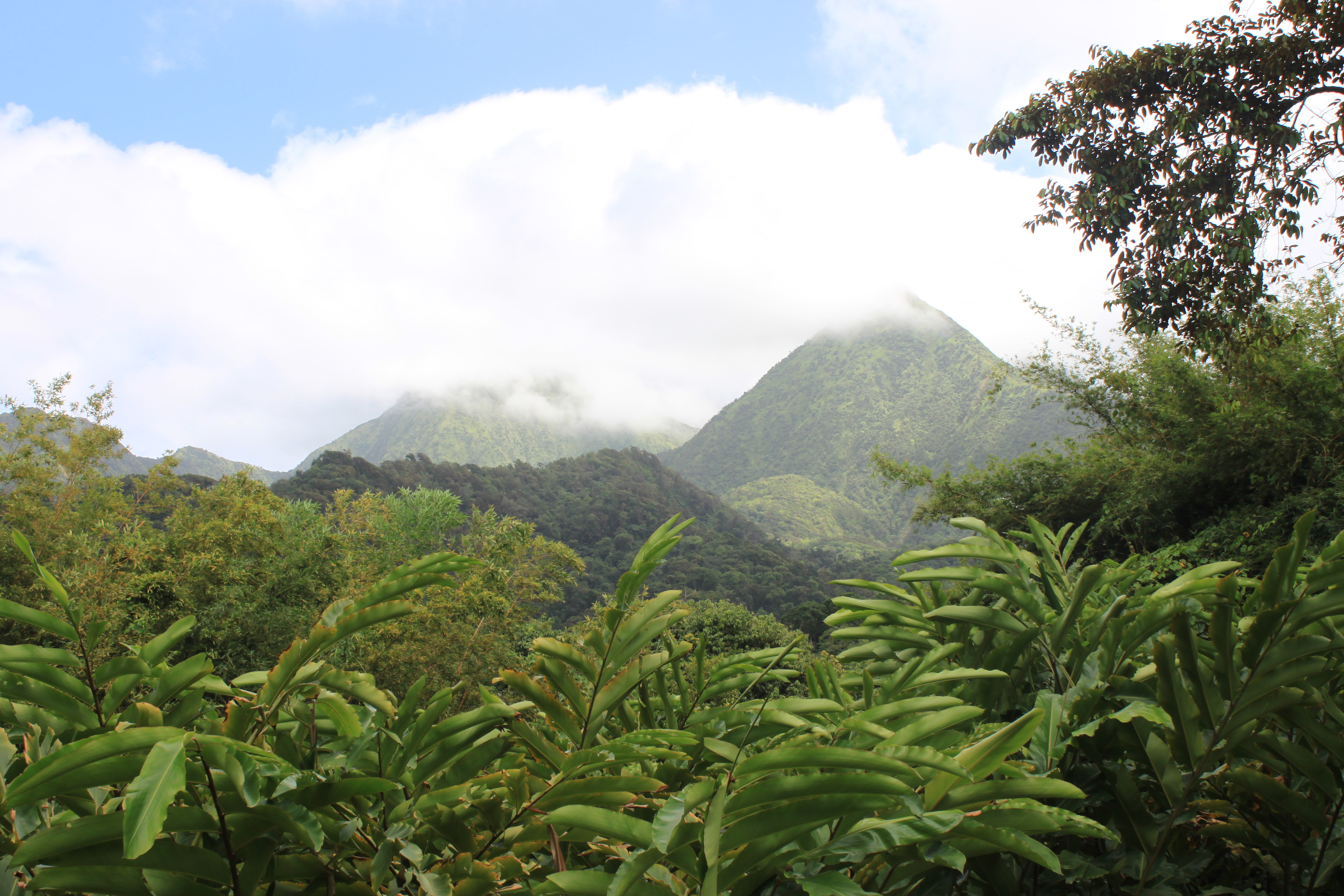
The Martinique Landscape

=== Antagonists ===
The plantation owner is also not named. He maintains order on the plantation and relentlessly pursues escapees. The master is baffled by the old slave man's change of character.

A mastiff was purchased by the plantation owner at the seaport. The dog had been transported from Gehenna to maintain order on the slave ship. The slave man had driven his master to the seaport on the day of its purchase. The dog has captured every runaway slave thus far. The slaves feared being attacked by the dog so much that they stopped attempting to escape

=== Supplementary Characters ===
167 slaves and two overseers live and work on the plantation. Slaves had tried to escape before, but the mastiff had always caught them. The master has a wife and four children.

== History of Creole Slavery ==
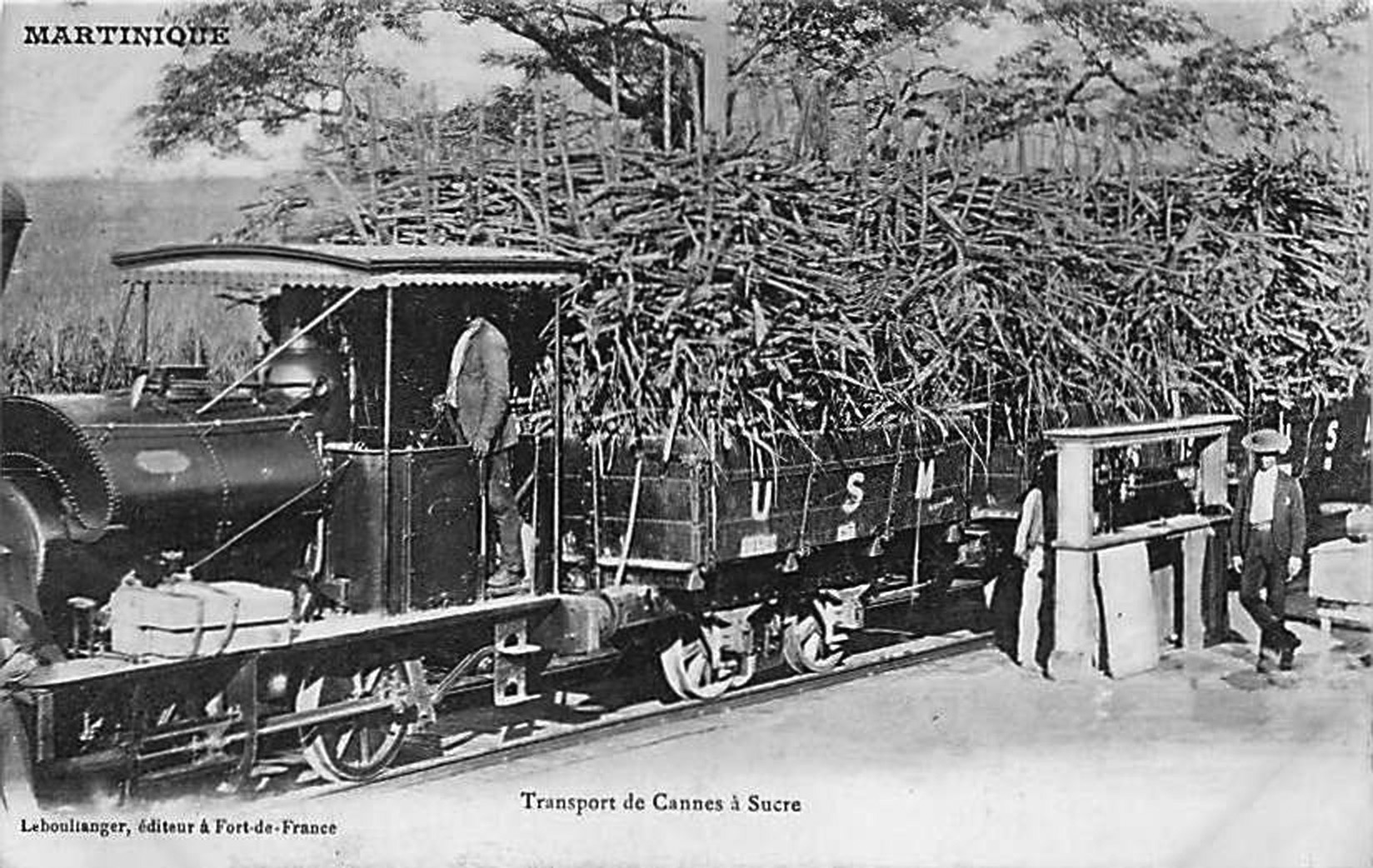
As translated from the image: "Sugar Cane Transport"

Slave Old Man takes place during the period of French colonization on the island of Martinique. Slaves were imported to operate the lucrative sugar plantations of the Lesser Antilles islands. This period began in 1636 following a decree by King Louis XIII which dictated the importation and usage of a workforce consisting of African slaves to replace the native Carib population. As the French continued to expand and colonize what became known as the French West Indies, slave labor was used extensively to fuel expansion and economic growth. Following the French Revolution of 1848, slavery on the island of Martinique was abolished after the signing of the Emancipation Proclamation of 1848, which brought freedom to slaves throughout the entire French West Indies.

== Reception ==
=== Awards ===
- 2018 Modern Language Association Aldo and Jeanne Scaglione Prize for a Translation of a Literacy Work – Winner
- 2019 Best Translated Book Award for Fiction – Winner
- 32nd Annual French-American Foundation Translation Prize – Winner
- National Book Critics Circle Award for Fiction – Shortlist

=== Critical acclaim ===
==== On Translation ====
- "Linda Coverdale’s translation, the first in English, is gloriously unshackled." Sam Sacks, The Wall Street Journal
- "The originality and musicality of phrases... are... a testament to Ms. Coverdale's skill..." Rebecca Foster, Pittsburgh Post-Gazette
- "Coverdale renders Chamoiseau's complex language beautifully into English, developing her own surprising strategy for Creole words, both translating them and leaving them in place... The moethod delivers clarity without sacrificing the richness of Chamoiseau's two languages, and by creating new constructions, Coverdale gives standard English a lively, improvisational, oral feeling." Sofia Samatar, Three Percent

==== On Writing Style ====
- "It can be a disorienting experience: like the slave, readers are trapped in a menacing forest and prone to hallucinations." Rebecca Foster, Pittsburgh Post-Gazette
- "Compared with the digressive exuberance of these more densely populated fictions, “Slave Old Man” transpires in a solitude that can be limiting. Chamoiseau's descriptions of the forest – beautifully translated from French and Creole by Linda Coverdale – are exhilarating, but the old man never quite comes into focus against the background of foliage and verbiage." Julian Lucas, The New York Times
- “The prose is so electrifyingly synesthetic that, on more than one occasion, I found myself stopping to rub my eyes in disbelief.” Parul Sehgal, The New York Times
- "Chamoiseau's world of slavery and freedom, however, is messy, violent, visceral, corporeal, and animal." Timothy J. Williams, Muster

=== Editions & Translation ===
The historical fiction novella was originally published in 1997 by Gallimard in cooperation with the French Ministry of Foreign Affairs and the Cultural Services of the French Embassy in the United States.

The English translation from the original French and Creole was published in 2018 by The New Press. Linda Coverdale blended the original French and Creole with the English translation throughout the text as hyphenated phrases between the original text and the translation or as substitutes for the English word.
