= Rocío Cerón =

Mexican poet

Rocío Cerón (born 1972) is a Mexican poet. She was born in Mexico City. Her work combines poetry with music, performance and video. She has written several volumes of poetry including Basalto (2002), Imperio/Empire (2008), Tiento (2010) and Diorama (2012). The last mentioned was translated into English by Anna Rosenwong and won the Best Translated Book Award. Her poems have been translated into many European languages.

== Selected works ==
- Basalto (ESN-CONACULTA, México, 2002), winner of the Premio Nacional de Literatura Gilberto Owen 2000;
- Soma (Eloísa Ediciones, Argentina, 2003);
- Imperio/Empire (Ediciones Monte Carmelo, 2008; FONCA-CONACULTA-MotínPoeta, 2009, interdisciplinary and bilingual edition);
- Tiento (UANL, México, 2010; translations: Verlag Hans Schiler, Alemania, 2011; Aura Latina, Suecia, 2012),
- El ocre de la tierra (Ediciones Liliputienses, España, 2011);
- Diorama (Tabasco 189-UANL, México, 2012; Amargord Ediciones, España, 2013; MacNally Jackson-Díaz Grey Editores, EUA, 2013, bilingual edition)
