= Tim Mohr =

German translator, writer and book editor (1969–2025)

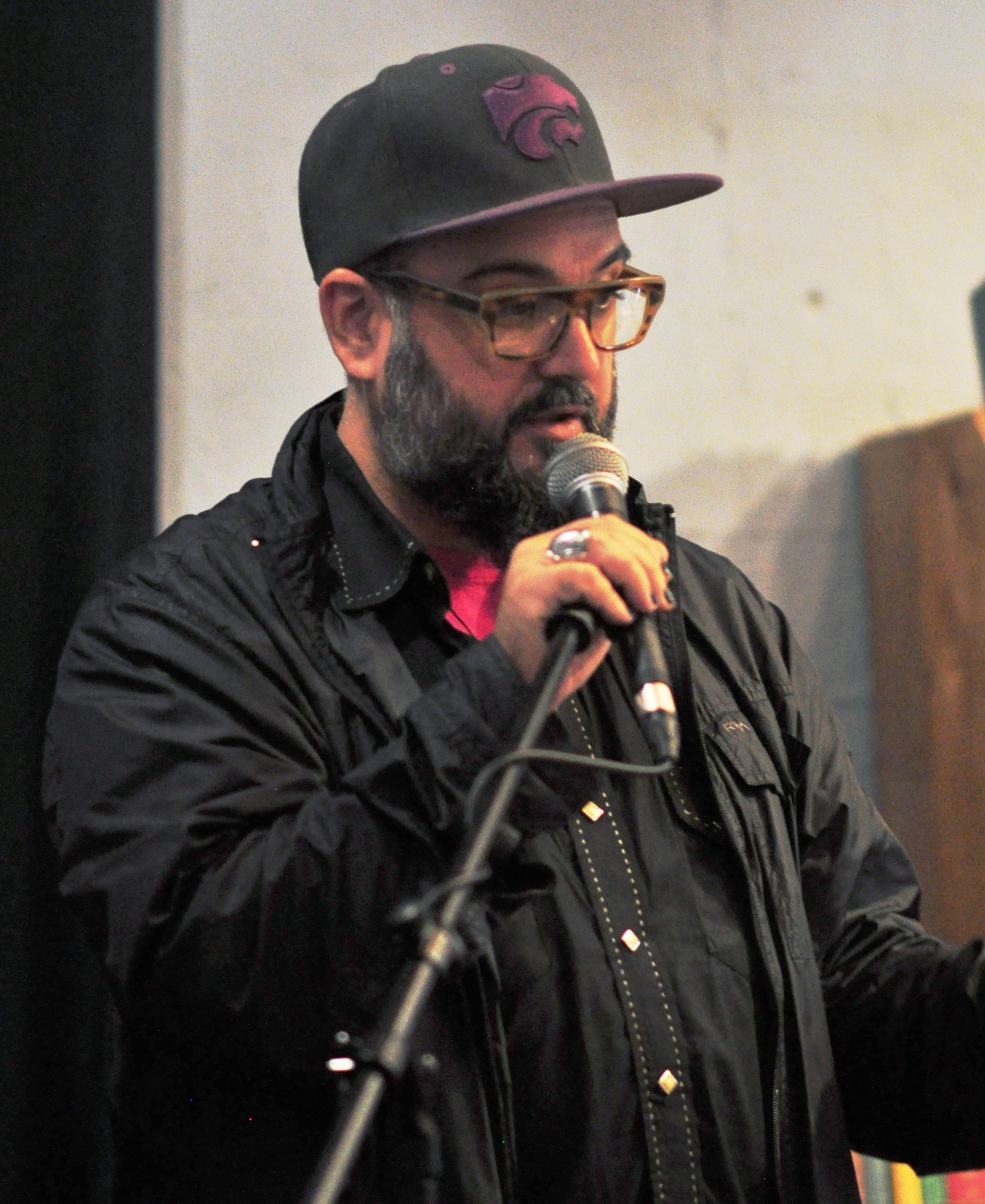
- Mohr in 2018
- Born: Timothy Crail Mohr; 15 December 1969; Baltimore, Maryland, U.S.
- Died: 31 March 2025 (aged 55); New York City, U.S.
- Occupations: Translator, writer, book editor
- Writing career
- Language: English
- Genres: Fiction, journalism
- Notable awards: Best Translated Book Award

Timothy Crail Mohr (15 December 1969 – 31 March 2025) was a New York-based translator, writer and editor. Early experiences working as a deejay in Berlin led Mohr to a career as a translator of German literature and as a chronicler of the Berlin music scene. Later in life, Mohr worked with celebrity musicians like Paul Stanley as a close collaborator, helping them to write the stories of their lives. His translation work was nominated for multiple prizes and awarded the Best Translated Book Award.

== Early life ==
Timothy Crail Mohr was born in Baltimore on 15 December 1969. His father, James, is a former history professor who has worked at the University of Maryland, Baltimore County and the University of Oregon. Mohr graduated from Yale University in 1992.

== Work ==
=== Writing ===
Mohr's narrative history of East German punk rock and the role the movement played in bringing down the Berlin Wall and in forming the culture of 21st century Berlin was published in German by Heyne in March 2017 as Stirb nicht im Warteraum der Zukunft: Die ostdeutschen Punks und der Fall der Mauer and in English by Algonquin Books on 11 September 2018 as Burning Down the Haus: Punk Rock, Revolution, and the Fall of the Berlin Wall. Vogue magazine said the book was "a joy in the way it brings back punk's fury and high stakes", while the Wall Street Journal wrote, "Mr. Mohr has written an important work of Cold War cultural history." Rolling Stone called Burning Down the Haus "a thrilling and essential social history that details the rebellious youth movement that helped change the world," and named it a book of the year. It was also listed as a book of the year by Rough Trade, NPR music staff, Longreads, Bookpage, Amazon, and the Chicago Public Library; the book was also long-listed for the Andrew Carnegie Medal for Excellence in Nonfiction.

=== Translation ===
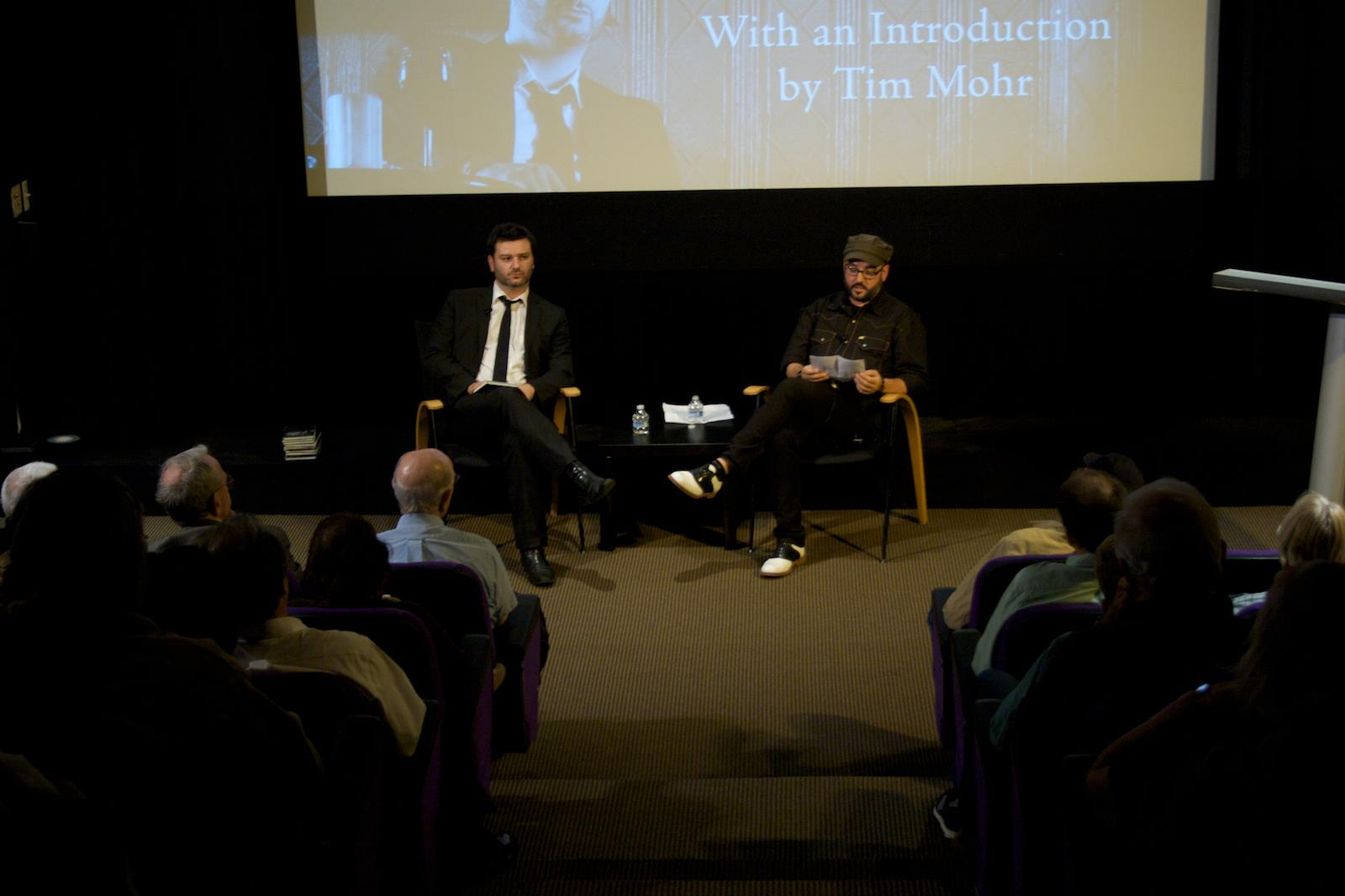
Writers Klaus Stimeder (aka JM Stim) (left) and Tim Mohr (right) in Washington D.C. in October 2012 at a reading of JM Stim's book

As a literary translator, he translated the German novels Guantanamo, by Dorothea Dieckmann (published in the U.S. by Soft Skull and in the U.K. by Duckworth), Wetlands and Wrecked by Charlotte Roche (both published in the U.S. by Grove/Atlantic and in the U.K. by 4th Estate), Broken Glass Park, The Hottest Dishes of the Tartar Cuisine, Just Call Me Superhero, Baba Dunja's Last Love, and My Grandmother's Braid by Alina Bronsky (all published worldwide by Europa Editions), Tiger Milk by Stefanie de Velasco, The Second Rider, by Alex Beer, and two novels by Wolfgang Herrndorf: Tschick, published in English as Why We Took the Car, and Sand.

Guantanamo was the recipient of the Three Percent award for best translation of 2007. The Hottest Dishes was named to Publishers Weekly's Best Books of 2011 list and the Los Angeles Public Library's Best Books of 2011, and nominated for the 2013 IMPAC Dublin literary award. Tiger Milk was also long-listed for the IMPAC Dublin award.

=== Collaborations ===
Many of Mohr's writing projects were collaborations with celebrity musicians and other pop-cultural figures. A project Mohr was working on with Hunter S. Thompson at the time Thompson's death was published as the writer's final interview in Playboy's May 2005 issue and later included in the book Ancient Gonzo Wisdom, published by Da Capo.

Mohr collaborated with original Guns N' Roses and Velvet Revolver bassist Duff McKagan on It's So Easy (and other lies), McKagan's memoir, published in October, 2011. The Los Angeles Public Library included It's So Easy on its list of the best books of the year, and the book was also named one of Amazon.com's "Best Books of 2011: Entertainment Section". Mohr also edited Gil Scott-Heron's posthumous memoir, The Last Holiday, which was published in January 2012.

In April 2014, Kiss frontman Paul Stanley published Face the Music, a memoir he collaborated on with Mohr. The book peaked at number two on the New York Times Best Seller list.

In June, 2021, Nonbinary, the memoir by Genesis P-Orridge, which Mohr collaborated on during P-Orridge's final years of life, was published a year after the death of the industrial music icon and cultural provocateur.

== Death ==
Mohr died of pancreatic cancer on 31 March 2025, at the age of 55.
