= Démolir Nisard =

2006 novel by Eric Chevillard

- Author: Eric Chevillard
- Language: French
- Genre: Novel
- Publisher: Les éditions de Minuit
- Publication date: 2006
- Publication place: France
- Media type: Print (Hardback)
- Pages: 176
- ISBN: 2-7073-1965-1
- OCLC: 71336727
- LC Class: PQ2663.H432 C46 2006

Démolir Nisard (Demolishing Nisard) is a 2006 novel by the French writer Eric Chevillard.

== Plot summary ==
The book is about the struggle of the narrator (who seems very much like the author himself) to annihilate Désiré Nisard, a French author and critic (1806–1888).

One of the characteristics of Nisard that so infuriates Chevillard's narrator is the fact that the critic so loathed the burgeoning modern French literature of his times. As Nisard considered that only classicism had a value, Chevillard's book can also be considered a form of meta-criticism upon contemporary trends in Literary criticism.

== Quotes ==
- "Rejoignez-moi. Mettons-nous à plusieurs ... contre tous les Nisard de la terre pour qui ...la littérature est un bien triste missel, une école de résignation. Le lecteur y vient tête basse entendre des sermons et des réprimandes ... La folie, la fantaisie, la satire, la hargne et le défi, la mélancolie et tous les autres soleils noirs de la poésie ont roulé dans le fossé." (Join me. Let's do it together... against all Nisard's of the Earth who consider literature as a sad missal, a school of resignation. The reader comes there, head ducked, to listen to sermons and scoldings... foolishness, fantasy, satire, spite and challenge, melancholy and all the other black suns of poetry roll into the gutter).

== See also ==
- Désiré Nisard
- Decadent movement
