= Angélica Freitas =

Brazilian poet and translator

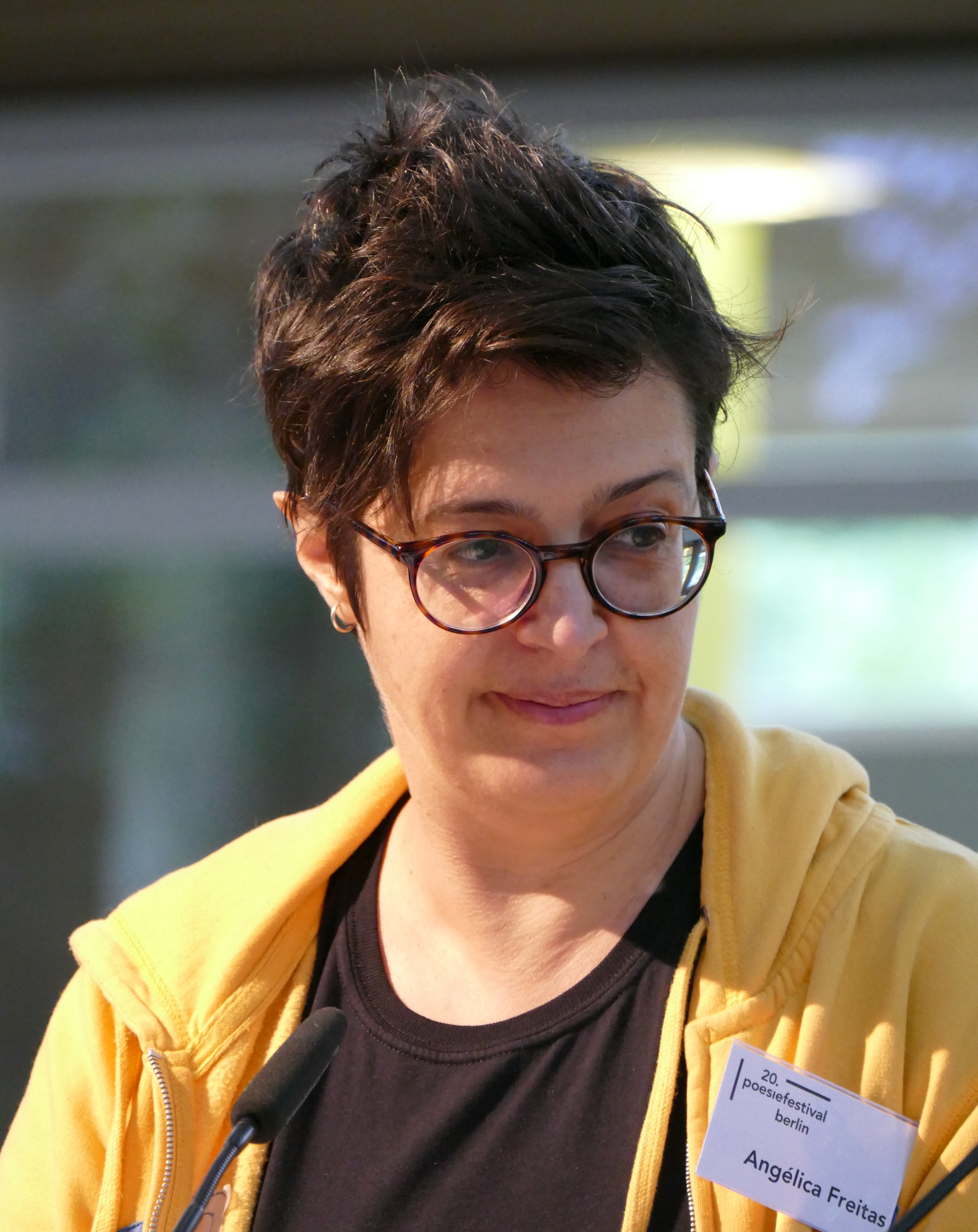
Angélica Freitas reads at the poetry festival in Berlin 2019

Angélica Freitas (born April 8, 1973) is a Brazilian poet and translator.

== Biography ==
Freitas was born in Pelotas, Rio Grande do Sul, in 1973. She graduated in journalism at Universidade Federal do Rio Grande do Sul (UFRGS), living for some time in Porto Alegre. She moved later to São Paulo, working as repórter for the newspaper O Estado de S. Paulo and magazine Informática Hoje. She left Brazil in 2006, having lived temporarily in the Netherlands, Bolivia and Argentina. Freitas came back to her birthplace Pelotas, where she currently lives.

== Literature ==
Angélica Freitas had her poems published for the first time in an anthology of Brazilian poetry published in Argentina, titled Cuatro poetas recientes del Brasil (Buenos Aires: Black & Vermelho, 2006), organized and translated by Argentine poet Cristian De Nápoli. On that same year, she participated of public readings of her poems in São Paulo, at Casa das Rosas, and at the Buenos Aires Latin American Poetry Festival. Her first book of poems was Rilke Shake (São Paulo: Cosac Naify, 2007).

Freitas's poetry was published in France, Germany, Mexico, Spain and the United States. Her poems were published at several print and digital magazines like Inimigo Rumor (Rio de Janeiro, Brasil), Diário de Poesía (Buenos Aires/Rosário, Argentina), águas furtadas (Lisbon, Portugal), Hilda (Berlin, Germany) and Aufgabe (New York City, United States).

In 2012 her book um útero é do tamanho de um punho was a finalist on 2013 Prêmio Portugal Telecom. The English edition of Rilke Shake (translated by Hillary Kaplan) won the Best Translated Book Award for poetry in 2016.

== Works ==
=== Poetry ===
- Rilke Shake (São Paulo: Cosac Naify, 2007)
- um útero é do tamanho de um punho (São Paulo: Cosac Naify, 2013)
- Canções de atormentar (São Paulo: Companhia das Letras, 2020)
- Mostra Monstra - ( São Paulo: Círculo de Poemas, 2025)

=== As editor ===
- Modo de Usar & Co. magazine (Rio de Janeiro: Livraria Berinjela, 2007)
- Modo de Usar & Co. 2 magazine (Rio de Janeiro: Livraria Berinjela, 2009)

=== In anthology ===
- Ghost Fishing: An Eco-Justice Poetry Anthology (University of Georgia Press, 2018) - United States of America
- Otra línea de fuego: quince poetas brasileñas ultracontemporaneas. Org. Heloísa Buarque de Hollanda. (Diputación Provincial de Málaga, 2009) - Spain
- VERSSchmuggel / Contrabando de Versos (Berlin: Das Wunderhorn / São Paulo: Editora 34, 2009) - Germany
- El libro de los gatos (Buenos Aires: Bajo la Luna, 2009) - Argentina
- A Poesia Andando. 13 poetas do Brasil (Lisboa: Cotovia, 2008) - Portugal
- Skräp-poesi: antología bilingüe en español y sueco (Malmö: ed. POESIA con C, 2008) - Sweden
- Natiunea Poetilor (Suceava: ed. Musatini, 2008) - Romania
- Poesía-añicos y sonares híbridos. Doce poetas latinoamericanos (Berlin: SuKulTur, 2007) - Germany
- Caos Portátil (Ciudad de México: ed. El Billar de Lucrecia, 2007) - México
- Cuatro Poetas Recientes del Brasil (Buenos Aires: Black & Vermelho, 2006) - Argentina - ISBN 9872222320
- Poemas no ônibus (Porto Alegre: Secretaria Municipal da Cultura, 2002) - Brasil - ISBN 393773774X
