= The Transmigration of Bodies =

Post-apocalyptic noir fiction novel by Yuri Herrera

- First edition
- Author: Yuri Herrera
- Original title: La transmigración de los cuerpos
- Translator: Lisa Dillman
- Language: Spanish
- Genre: Post-apocalyptic fiction, noir fiction
- Publisher: Editorial Periférica (MX); And Other Stories (US)
- Publication date: 2013 (MX)
- Publication place: Mexico
- English publication date: 2016 (US)
- Media type: Print (Paperback)
- Pages: 136 p. (Spanish edition); 101 p. (English edition)

The Transmigration of Bodies (Spanish: La transmigración de los cuerpos) is a post-apocalyptic noir fiction novel by Mexican author Yuri Herrera. Originally written and published in Spanish in 2013, the book was translated into English by Lisa Dillman and published in 2016 by And Other Stories. The book focuses on an underworld fixer who tries to arrange a peaceful exchange of bodies between two rival criminal gangs in a corrupt city that is in the midst of an epidemic.

== Setting ==
The Transmigration of Bodies is set in an unidentified Mexican city. Although the military has a strong presence (including regular street checkpoints), organized crime and violence are rampant. A plague, spread by insects and bodily fluids, is ravaging the city, which has resulted in empty streets as most citizens isolate themselves from the epidemic in their houses. Many public services like running water are non-operational, and the lack of citizens on the streets has led to increased petty crime.

== Plot summary ==
The Redeemer, a fixer who works primarily in the criminal underworld, wakes up with a hangover at his apartment in the Big House. One of his neighbors, Three Times Blonde, asks him for credit for her phone. They go to her apartment to make the exchange, and end up eating and having sex. Another resident of the apartment, an anemic student, hopes to share in their meal, or at least have leftovers, but they shun him.

The next morning the Redeemer gets a call from Dolphin Fonseca, a barrio boss. Dolphin wants him to find his son Romeo, who has disappeared after visiting Lover's Lane, a street of strip clubs. The Redeemer learns from the bartender Óscar that Romeo was taken by boys from the Castro family, another rich criminal household. He also learns from Dolphin's daughter (the Unruly) that Dolphin has taken Baby Girl, Castro's daughter, to an old house called Las Pericas. When the Redeemer goes to Las Pericas, he finds Baby Girl dead.

He calls a nurse, Vicky, to examine Baby Girl's body. She concludes that Baby Girl died from the plague, having gone several days without treatment. She also notes that the body has not been ravished after death. They go to meet the Mennonite, an old friend and fellow fixer, who is working for the Castros to retrieve Baby Girl. The Mennonite tells him that Romeo is also dead. When the Redeemer asks the Castro sons about the matter, they say that Romeo, injured by a van, had asked them to take him to their house so he could rest for a few hours. However, he died shortly after they brought him to the house. After examining Romeo's body, Vicky concludes that their story is true.

The Redeemer and the Mennonite go back to Lover's Lane to talk again to Óscar. They learn that Romeo was at the strip clubs in order to visit his boyfriend, who worked at the ladies’ club. When the Redeemer goes to Las Pericas to pick up Baby Girl's body, he finds out from the Unruly that Baby Girl was already coughing blood when she was picked up as hostage. The Redeemer puts Baby Girl's body in his apartment until it can be exchanged for Romeo's body. He is tempted into Three Times Blonde's apartment to enjoy her company, but when he leaves, he is beaten by Three Times Blonde's boyfriend, who has heard about her affair via the anemic student. Fortunately, a friend arrives and rescues the Redeemer.

The Mennonite calls the Redeemer to tell him that Las Pericas (the old mansion from earlier in the book) has burned down. Meanwhile, the Redeemer goes to a lawyer named Gustavo and finds out that the Castro and Fonseca families are descended from the same father by different wives, and that the two families have been fighting over legal possession of the ancestral house ever since the father's death. The Redeemer returns home and the Fonsecas and Castros arrive to make the corpse exchange. There is no fight, but harsh words are exchanged over the burning of Las Pericas—each family blames the other. Both families leave, clearly distraught after seeing the dead bodies of their family members. The Redeemer goes to Three Times Blonde, but she leaves as soon as she notices that the weather has cleared. His landlady asks the Redeemer to try to free the anemic student, who is now in police custody, and he agrees and leaves Big House.

== Major characters ==
- The Redeemer is a fixer who helps negotiate violence-free settlements for conflicts between rival criminals. A former lawyer, he now principally brokers hostage exchanges. Although he loathes many actions of the gangsters, he tries to mediate between gangs to maintain peace. In the novel, he serves as the negotiator for the Fonseca family.
- The Fonseca family is a criminal family engaged in various gang activities. They are descended from the same man as the Castro family by his second wife, and have been at odds with the Castros ever since his death.
  - “Dolphin” Fonseca is a crime boss in charge of the Fonseca clan. One of his lungs was shot, causing him to wheeze, and his nose was misshapen while snorting cocaine, leading to his nickname. The Redeemer has been working jobs for him ever since they met many years ago.
  - Romeo Fonseca is Dolphin's son. He routinely visits Lover's Lane to see shows and visit his boyfriend, who works as a stripper.
- The Mennonite is originally from the countryside, but years ago moved to the city and started work as a fixer. He met the Redeemer on a shared assignment and the two became fast friends. In the novel, he serves as the negotiator for the Castro family.
- The Castro family are the chief rivals of the Fonseca family. They are descended from their patriarch's first wife, and have been at enmity with the Fonsecas ever since the two disputed his inheritance.
  - Baby Girl is the daughter of the Castro family. She is less cutthroat than her brothers and father, and as a result receives less affection from them.
- Three Times Blonde is the Redeemer's neighbor at the Big House. The femme fatale of the novel, little is revealed about her except that the Redeemer finds her extremely attractive and she has several boyfriends.
- Vicki is a nurse and friend of the Redeemer. She has regular employment, but is also tough enough to help the Redeemer in the criminal underworld.

== Translation ==
Lisa Dillman translated this book from Spanish into English. Her translation style incorporates the styles and rhythms of Spanish into the book. Some Mexican idioms and grammatical forms are translated literally, a technique that retains a feel for the original Spanish language. Herrera's characteristic short descriptions are also maintained in the English translation. Stylized spellings and witty one-liners recall the gum-shoe prose of Raymond Chandler. In keeping Herrera's style and format, Dillman allows for a fast-paced book with imagery that does not detract from the plot. Despite the compliments on the translation, Herrera insists that translating a work will always result in slight variations and adaptations from the original meaning.

== Themes ==
=== Romeo and Juliet ===
Critics have drawn similarities between Transmigration of Bodies and Romeo and Juliet. The Los Angeles Times' Dustin Illingworth has stated that the feuding families of the Castros and Fonsecas are similar to the Capulets and Montagues. The complicating factor in The Transmigration of Bodies comes from the plague-ridden setting, because not only do the families have a longstanding grudge, but the entire city has been thrown into an atmosphere of deeper mistrust by the epidemic. According to Aaron Bady of the Boston Review, it is the Redeemer's role to bring the aggrieved parties together in weeping for their lost children and not violence; or, as Friar Laurence says in Romeo and Juliet, to "with their death bury their parents’ strife."

=== Disease ===
The streets of the city are deserted because of the plague. The entire population is in a panic. During one scene in the novel, a peddler blowing bubbles is attacked when citizens realize that the bubbles contain his saliva and therefore may be spreading the plague. This reinforces the ideas of violence and Herrera has stated that this scene and the reaction of citizens to the plague is inspired by the 2009 swine flu pandemic in Mexico City. Rien Fertel of Kenyon Review mentions that this breakdown of society occurs only four days after the plague has hit the city, leading to mistrust among the population. The Redeemer's efforts to complete his job are complicated by the disease's spread and the general atmosphere of paranoia throughout the city.

== Reception ==
Transmigration of Bodies has been met with generally positive reviews as well as some criticisms. The Guardian praised the novel for its impact and the powerful images of contemporary Mexico it depicts. The Los Angeles Times complimented Herrera's writing style, but expressed criticism for the "occasional sense of flatness" that did not fit with the violent depictions and themes. Despite any criticisms, the book has received several prestigious literary awards.

== Awards ==
Year	Award	Category	Result	Ref
2015	English Pen Award	—	Won	
2017	Oxford-Weidenfeld Translation Prize	—	Shortlisted	
2018	International Dublin Literary Award	—	Longlisted	

== Trilogy ==
The Transmigration of Bodies is book two in a trilogy by Yuri Herrera. The entire trilogy focuses on contemporary issues in Mexico, particularly in the national capital. Signs Preceding the End of the World (Señales que precederán al fin del mundo) was published first in the United States in 2015, but was actually the third to be written. Kingdom Cons (Trabajos del reino) was the first to be written in the trilogy, but was published last in the States. These other books were positively received with awards in the United States as well.
