= Fredrik Nyberg (writer) =

Swedish writer and poet

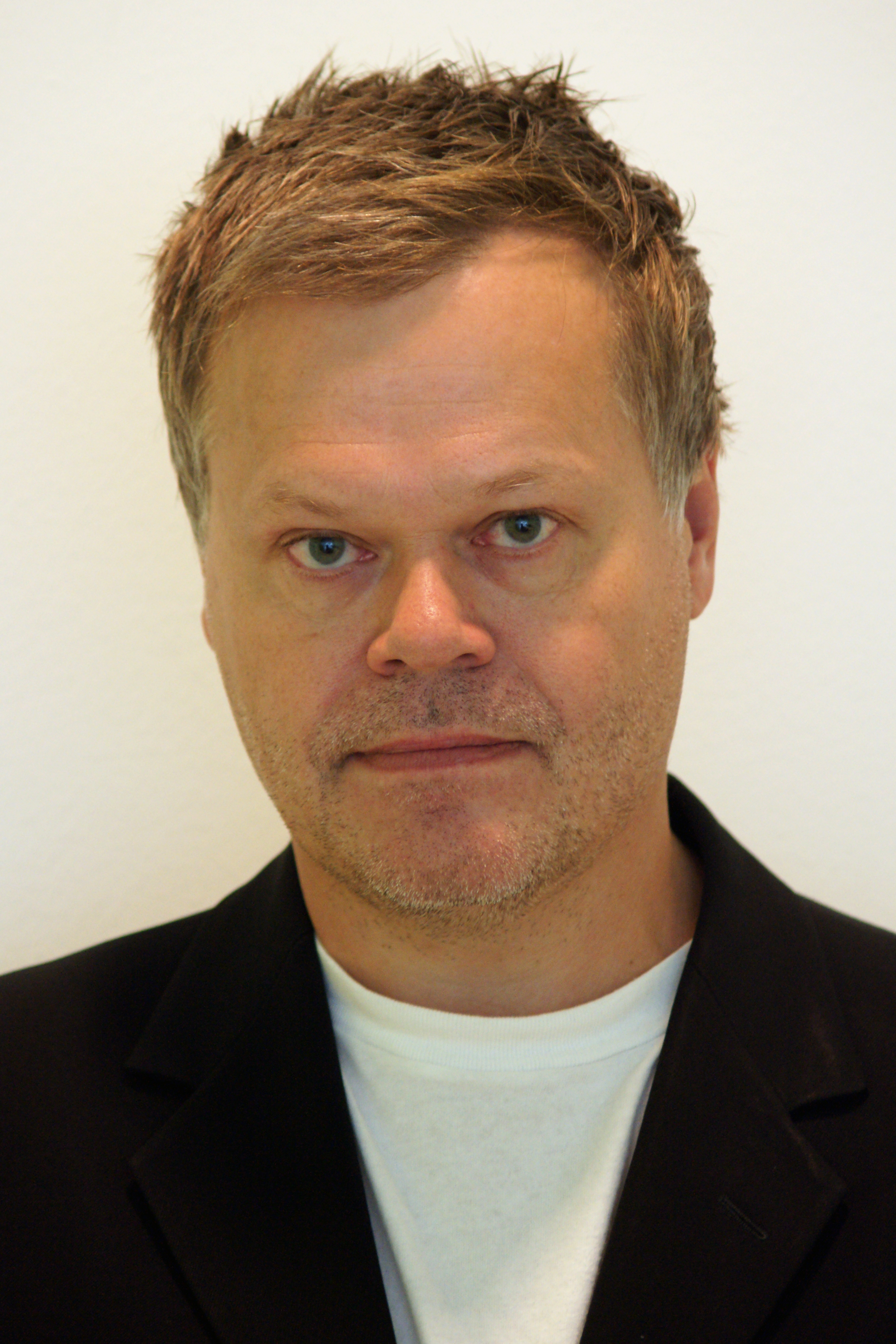
Portrait of Fredrik Nyberg

Fredrik Nyberg born 1968 in Partille, is a Swedish writer and poet.

Nyberg serves on the editorial board of the Swedish literary publication OEI

== Bibliography ==
- En annorlunda praktik 1998 (translated into English by Jennifer Hayashida as A Different Practice)
- Blomsterur 2000
- Åren 2002
- Det blir inte rättvist bara för att båda blundar 2006
- Pandi och kamelen träffar surikaterna 2007
- Nio, nine, neun, neuf 2008

== Awards ==
- 2006 Guldprinsen (Swedish prize for poetry)
- 2008 Shortlisted for the poetry prize of the Best Translated Book Award for A Different Practice
