= Signs Preceding the End of the World =

2009 novel by Yuri Herrera

- 2015 book cover
- Author: Yuri Herrera
- Translator: Lisa Dillman
- Language: Originally Spanish, translated to English for Anglo readers
- Subject: Immigration fiction, Border area fiction
- Genre: Surrealism
- Set in: Fictional geographical locations
- Published: 2009
- Publisher: & Other Stories,
- Publication place: Spain and United Kingdom
- English publication date: 2015
- Media type: Print, eBook, Audio
- ISBN: 9781908276421
- OCLC: 889949964
- Website: Official website

Signs Preceding the End of the World (Spanish: Señales que precederán al fin del mundo) is a 2009 novel by Yuri Herrera and translated into English by Lisa Dillman in 2015. In 2016, Herrera and Dillman won the Best Translated Book Award for Fiction. Also, with this book, Herrera is the first Spanish-language writer to win the award for fiction. The Spanish title of this novel is Señales que precederán al fin del mundo.

== Plot ==
This narrative follows a young woman's cross-border journey from the south, crossing the border to the north. for two objectives: to deliver a package and to find her brother. The protagonist's mother has tasked her with bringing her brother home after he was persuaded to cross the border by their estranged father's promise of land. The trip involves travel through her home village, a provincial town, the Big Chilango, and a subsequent bus ride to a river crossing that borders the north. She completes the crossing by inner tube and successfully traverses the desert, where she faces risks from people-smugglers, vigilantes, and border patrol.

== See also ==
- Cross=Stitch by Jazmina Barrera
