= Yuri Herrera =

Mexican political scientist, editor, and contemporary writer

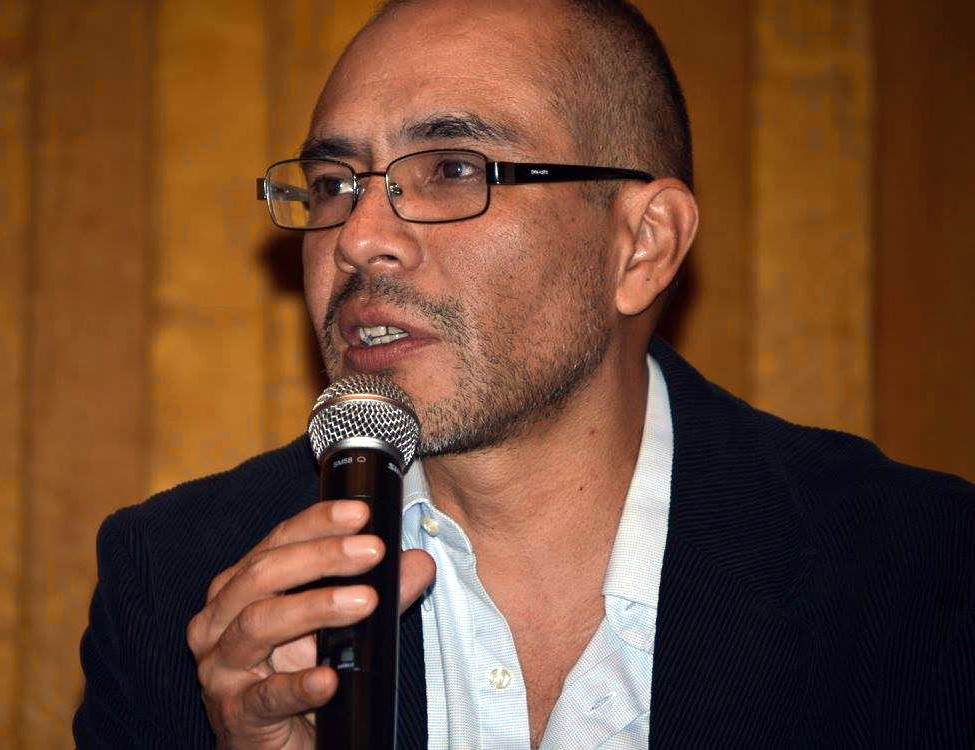
- Yuri Herrera in 2015.
- Born: 1970 (age 55–56); Actopan, Hidalgo, Mexico
- Education: UNAM
- Occupations: political scientist, editor, and contemporary writer
- Awards: Premio Otras Voces, Otros Ámbitos

Yuri Herrera (born 1970) is a Mexican political scientist, editor, and contemporary writer. He currently teaches at Tulane University in New Orleans.

== Biography ==
Yuri Herrera studied Political Science at the National Autonomous University of Mexico (UNAM), obtained a master's degree in Creative Writing at the University of Texas, El Paso, and a Ph.D., 2009, in Hispanic Language and Literature at the University of California, Berkeley. He was the editor of the literary magazine El perro and former Mellow Postdoctoral Fellow at Tulane University.

His first novel, Trabajos del reino, won the 2004 Premio Binacional de Novela Joven. The novel was also published in Spain (Periférica, 2008) and won the Premio Otras Voces, Otros Ámbitos, being considered the best work of fiction published in Spain by a jury of 100 people, including editors, journalists and cultural critics.

Elena Poniatowska characterised his prose as "stunning" and the novel as an entrance "to the golden gate of Mexican literature". Gabriel Wolfson describes Herrera's work as "amazing, constructed from exchanging cultured language for popular talk, emphasizing the importance of names, and using the forcefulness of certain terms while wisely omitting others".

His second novel, Señales que precederán al fin del mundo (2009; translated as Signs Preceding the End of the World by Lisa Dillman, And Other Stories, 2015), has led Herrera to being considered one of the most relevant young Mexican writers in the Spanish language. He has collaborated in magazines such as Letras libres.

== Style ==
Discussing the style Herrera uses in his texts, he declared, "I like to say that style isn't surface, style is a form of knowledge".

=== Narrative ===
Working with space is one of the main characteristics of Herrera's work. Speaking about Kingdom Cons, he explained that Ciudad Juárez is the model he used for the space. However, it is a version of Juárez modified for his convenience. Likewise, his novel Signs Preceding the End of the World makes no mention of any actual city. Herrera explains, "I wanted the novel not to be read only as a novel about Mexican migration, even though the scenery and setting resembles certain places of Mexico and the border between Mexico and the United States." Herrera is an avid reader of Cervantes' Don Quixote and uses many elements of indigenous Aztec mythology in his books, especially evident in Signs. Although his books never define clearly the cities and regions where they are situated, Herrera's narratives refer to highly political contexts. He states, "Literature cannot take full responsibility for creating good or bad men and women, but what it can do is give you the tools to make yourself into a conscious citizen. In this sense, I believe literature always entails a political responsibility."

== Bibliography ==
- Trabajos del reino (2004). Kingdom Cons, trans. Lisa Dillman (And Other Stories, 2017).
- Señales que precederán al fin del mundo (2009). Signs Preceding the End of the World, trans. Lisa Dillman (And Other Stories, 2015).
- La transmigración de los cuerpos (2013). The Transmigration of Bodies, trans. Lisa Dillman (And Other Stories, 2016).
- El incendio de la mina El Bordo (2018). A Silent Fury: The El Bordo Mine Fire, trans. Lisa Dillman (And Other Stories, 2020).
- Diez planetas (2019). Ten Planets: Stories, trans. Lisa Dillman (And Other Stories / Graywolf, 2023).
- La estación del pantano (2022). Season of the Swamp, trans. Lisa Dillman (And Other Stories / Graywolf, 2024).

== Awards and honors ==
- 2015: Signs Preceding the End of the World included in The Guardian's "Best Fiction of 2015" and NBC News' "Ten Great Latino Books"
- 2016: Best Translated Book Award for Signs Preceding the End of the World
- 2016: Anna Seghers Prize
- 2023: Ursula K. Le Guin Prize Shortlist for Ten Planets
