= Gleb Shulpyakov =

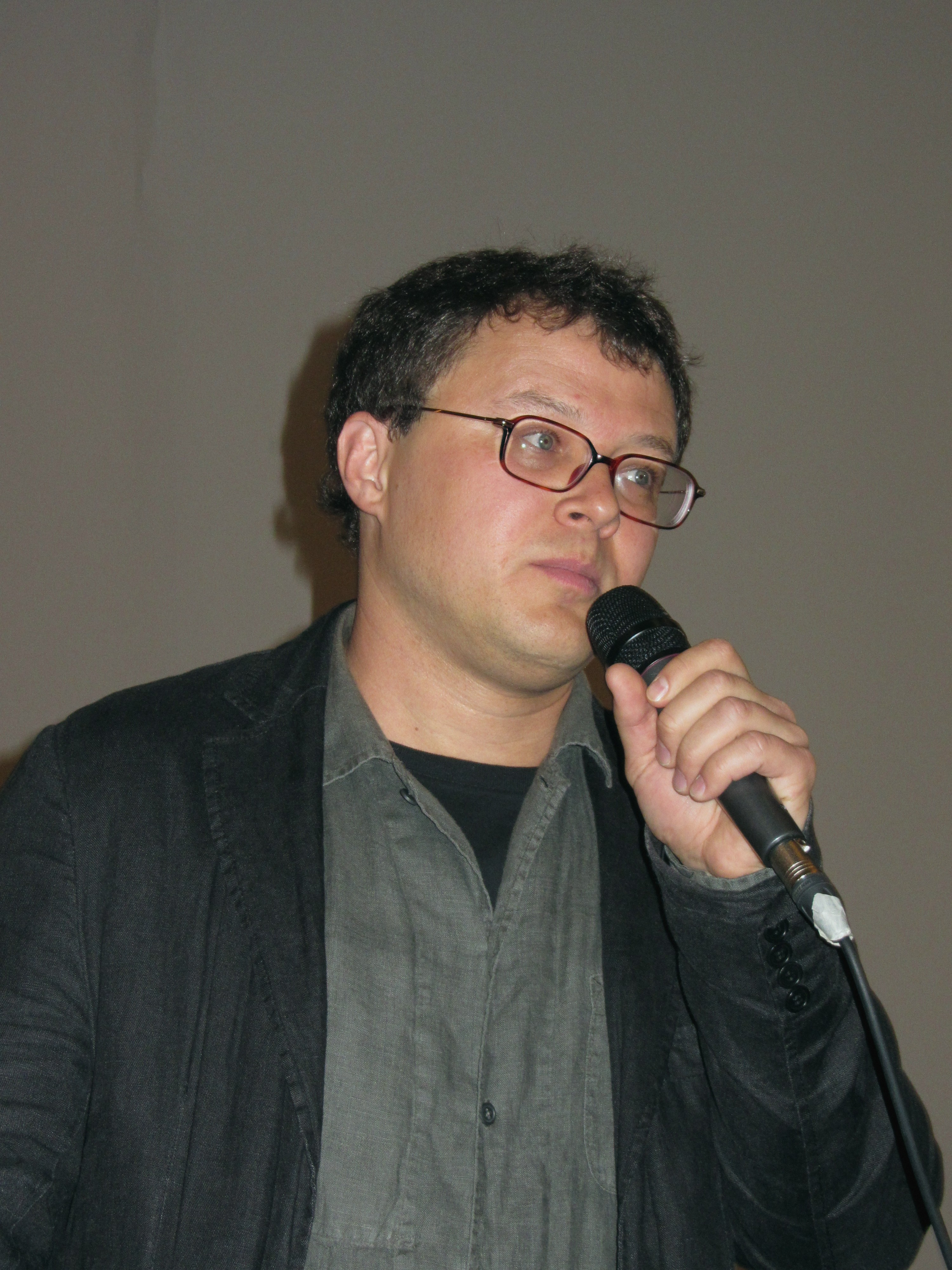
Shulpyakov at the 7 Moscow International Book Festival, 2012

Gleb Yuryevich Shulpyakov (Russian: Глеб Ю́рьевич Шульпяко́в; born 28 January 1971) is a Russian poet, essayist, novelist and translator. He lives in Moscow.

== Biography ==
Shulpyakov graduated from Moscow State University with a degree in literary journalism. He is the author of numerous essays for Russian periodicals, five novels, five poetry collections, books of travel essays and artistic research "Batyushkov is not ill", dedicated to art and life of Konstantin Batyushkov, poet of the golden age of Russian poetry.

In 2001, he was awarded the Triumph Prize for his first full-length book of poems, The Flick. His second book of poems, Acorn, was published in 2007. His first book of poetry to appear in English was A Fireproof Box, translated by Christopher Mattison and published by Canarium Books in 2011. His poetry is translated into English, German, French, Italian, Chinese, Bulgarian, Arabic, Spanish and Turkish languages.

In addition to his books of poems, Shulpyakov is the author of several novels (The Sinan Book, Tsunami, Fez, The Dante Museum, Red Planet), books of travel essays (Persona Grappa, Uncle’s Dream), a play (Pushkin in America), and essays and literary criticism for Russian periodicals (Vedomosti, Nezavisimaya Gazeta, Literaturnaya Gazeta, Ogonyok, Novaya Gazeta etc). He is the editor of Novaya Yunost literary magazine. He has translated various British and American works into Russian, including poetry by Ted Hughes, Robert Hass, Fiona Sampson, Judith Cofer, Elaine Feinstein and W. H. Auden. He is the author of The Dwarf play staged by Moscow state Mayakovski Theatre (2004) and Flute and Red poetry show for Moscow Art Theatre (2017).

== Works ==
Translations

W.H. Auden: Selected essays and poems (1998)

W.H.Auden: Table-Talk (2017)

W.H.Auden: The Dyer's Hand. Book of essays (2021)

Poetry and prose in Russian

- The Flick (poems) (2001)
- Persona Grappa (travel essays) (2002)
- Pushkin in America (play) (2005)
- Cognac (gastronomic research) (2004)
- Uncle's Dream (travel essays) (2005)
- The Sinan Book (novel) (2005)
- Acorn (poems) (2007)
- Tsunami (novel) (2008)
- Fez (novel) (2010)
- Letters to Yakub (poems) (2012)
- The Dante Museum (novel) (2013)
- The Poet and the Philosopher: a Dialogue (with Leon Tsvasman) (2015)
- Samyat (poems) (2017)
- Red Planet (novel) (2029)
- West to East (literary essays) (2021)
- White human (collected poems) (2021)
- Batyushkov is not ill (artistic research) (2024)

Recognition

- 2001 — Triumph Award in the field of poetry.
- 2005 — winner of the drama competition Dramatis personae for the play "Pushkin in America".
- 2012 — shortlisted "Award for the best translated book" for the collection of poems "A Fireproof Box".
- 2013 — special diploma of the Moscow Account Award for the book of poems "Letters to Yakub"
- 2024 — Anthologia Award for the highest achievements of modern Russian poetry (Novyi Mir magazine)
