= Fantomas contra los vampiros multinacionales =

Book by Julio Cortázar

- Author: Julio Cortázar
- Language: Spanish
- Genre: Crime fiction
- Published: 1975 (Excelsior)
- Publication place: Argentina
- Media type: Comic book
- ISBN: 978-950-732-035-4
- OCLC: 253702796

Fantomas Versus the Multinational Vampires (Spanish: Fantomas Contra los Vampiros Multinacionales) is a graphic novel by Julio Cortázar published in 1975. The book is loosely based on Issue #201 of the Mexican comic book series Fantomas: The Elegant Menace, which features a cameo appearance from Cortázar.

Using panels from the aforementioned comic book issue, as well as other visuals, the book follows its narrator, Cortázar, who is leaving the Second Russell Tribunal on human rights abuses in Latin America when he discovers that he is a character in the issue itself. As Cortázar continues reading, the line between fiction and reality is blurred, and the effectiveness of both the Second Russell Tribunal and Fantomas's efforts to stop a global conspiracy of disappearing books is called into question.
