= Gabrielle Wittkop =

French writer and translator

- Born: Gabrielle Ménardeau; May 27, 1920; Nantes, France
- Died: December 22, 2002 (aged 82); Frankfurt, Germany
- Occupations: Writer; translator
- Spouse: Justus Franz Wittkop
- Writing career
- Language: French; German
- Genres: Novels; poetry
- Notable work: The Necrophiliac (1972)

Gabrielle Wittkop (née Ménardeau; 27 May 1920 – 22 December 2002) was a French writer and translator.

== Life and career ==
Gabrielle Wittkop was born on 27 May 1920 in Nantes. During the Nazi occupation of Paris, she met a German deserter, Justus Wittkop, whom she hid from the Nazis. He was homosexual and twenty years older than her, but they married in a union she called an "intellectual alliance." In 1946, after the end of the Second World War she moved with him to Frankfurt where she would stay for the rest of her life.

Her first book on the German writer E.T.A. Hoffmann was published in German in 1966. Her first novel, a transgressive erotic drama about a necrophiliac antique dealer, Le Nécrophile (The Necrophiliac, 1972), was published in 1972 by Régine Desforges when she was 52. She wrote several highly regarded novels and travelogues, as well as translating works by Theodor Adorno, Uwe Johnson, Wolfgang Hildesheimer and Peter Handke into French. She also contributed to the art pages of the Frankfurter Allgemeine Zeitung.

Her husband committed suicide in 1986 after he was diagnosed with Parkinson's disease and she wrote an account of it in Hemlock (1988). In 2002, she herself committed suicide in Frankfurt at the age of 82, after she was diagnosed with lung cancer.

Although popular in France and Germany, Wittkop's works were not widely available in English until the 2010s. The Necrophiliac was translated in a Canadian edition by Don Bapst in 2011, and in a Danish edition by Christina Ytzen in 2018. English translations of Les Départs exemplaires (Exemplary Departures, 1995) and Sérénissime Assassinat (Murder Most Serene, 2001) were published by Wakefield Press in 2015.

== English translations ==
- The Necrophiliac, published by ECW Press. ISBN 978-1550229431
- Exemplary Departures, published by Wakefield Press. ISBN 978-1-939663-13-9
- Murder Most Serene, published by Wakefield Press. ISBN 978-1-939663-14-6
