= Éric Chevillard =

Contemporary French writer

- Born: June 18, 1964 (age 62); La Roche-sur-Yon, France

Éric Chevillard (born 18 June 1964) is a French novelist. He has won awards for several novels including La nébuleuse du crabe in 1993, which won the Fénéon Prize for Literature.

Chevillard was born in La Roche-sur-Yon, Vendée. His work often plays with the codes of narration, sometimes to the degree that it is even difficult to understand which story is being told. His books have consequently been classified as postmodern literature. He has been noted for his associations with Les Éditions de Minuit, a publishing-house largely associated with the leading experimental writers composing in French today.

Chevillard is an alumnus of the École supérieure de journalisme de Lille.

== Awards and honors ==
- 2013 Best Translated Book Award, shortlist, Prehistoric Times

== Bibliography ==
- Mourir m'enrhume (Dying Gives Me a Cold), Éditions de Minuit, 1987.
- Le démarcheur (The Door-to-Door Salesman), Minuit, 1989.
- Palafox, Minuit, 1990.
  - Palafox, translated by Wyatt Mason for Archipelago Books, 2004.
- Le caoutchouc décidément (Definitely the Rubber), Minuit, 1992.
- La nébuleuse du crabe, Minuit, 1993. (Fénéon Prize)
  - The Crab Nebula, translated by Jordan Stump and Eleanor Hardin for Bison Books, 1997.
- Préhistoire, Minuit, 1994.
  - Prehistoric Times, translated by Alyson Waters for Archipelago Books, 2012.
- Un fantôme (A Ghost), Minuit, 1995.
- Au plafond, Minuit, 1997.
  - On the Ceiling, translated by Jordan Stump for Bison Books, 2000.
- L'œuvre posthume de Thomas Pilaster (Thomas Pilaster's Posthumous Works), Minuit, 1999.
  - The Posthumous Works of Thomas Pilaster, translated by Christopher Clarke for Sublunary Editions, 2021.
- Les absences du capitaine Cook (Captain Cook's Absences), Minuit, 2001.
- Du hérisson (Concerning the Hedgehog), Minuit, 2002.
- Le vaillant petit tailleur, Minuit, 2004. (Prix Wepler)
  - The Valiant Little Tailor, translated by Jordan Stump for Yale University Press, 2022.
- Scalps (Scalps), Fata Morgana, 2005.
- Oreille rouge (Red Ear), Minuit, 2005.
- D'attaque (By Attack), Argol, 2006.
- Démolir Nisard, Minuit, 2006. Prix Roger Caillois)
  - Demolishing Nisard, translated by Jordan Stump for Dalkey Archive Press, 2011.
- Commentaire autorisé sur l'état de squelette (Authorized Commentary on the Skeleton's State), Fata Morgana, 2007.
- Sans l'orang-outan (Without the Orangutan), Minuit, 2007.
- Dans la zone d'activité (In the Active Area), graphisme par Fanette Mellier, Dissonances, 2007.
- En territoire Cheyenne (In Cheyenne Territory), Fata Morgana, illustrations de Philippe Favier, mai 2009.
- La vérité sur le salaire des cadres (The Truth about Executive Salaries), Le Cadran ligné, 2009 ("livre en un seul poème")
- Choir (Dropping), Minuit, 2010
- Dino Egger (Dino Egger), Minuit, 2011 - Prix Virilo 20111
- Iguanes et Moines (Monks and Iguanas), Fata Morgana, 2011
- L'auteur et moi, Minuit, 2012
  - The Author and Me, translated by Jordan Stump for Dalkey Archive Press, 2014.
- La Ménagerie d'Agathe (Agathe's Côterie), Actes Sud, ill. de Frédéric Rébéna, 2013
- Péloponnèse (Peloponnesus), Fata Morgana, 2013
- Le Désordre azerty (The QWERTY Disorder), Minuit, 2014
  - QWERTY Invectives, translated by Pietr Behrman de Sinéty for the Cahier Series of Sylph Editions, 2018.
- Juste ciel (Just Sky), Minuit, 2015
- Les Théories de Suzie (Suzie's Theories), avec Jean-François Martin, Hélium, 2015
- Ronce-Rose (Briar-Rose), Minuit, 2017
- Monotobio, Minuit, 2020
- La Chambre à brouillard (The Fog Room), Minuit, 2023

L'Autofictif, a series of books based on his daily blog:

- L'Autofictif - Journal 2007-2008, Éditions de l'Arbre Vengeur, 2009
- L'autofictif voit une loutre - Journal 2008-2009, Éditions de l'Arbre Vengeur, 2010
- L'Autofictif père et fils - Journal 2009-2010, Éditions de l'Arbre Vengeur, 2011
- L'Autofictif prend un coach - Journal 2010-2011, Éditions de l'Arbre Vengeur, 2012
- L'Autofictif croque un piment - Journal 2011-2012, Éditions de l'Arbre Vengeur, 2013
- L'Autofictif en vie sous les décombres - Journal 2012-2013, Éditions de l'Arbre Vengeur, 2014
- L'Autofictif au petit pois - Journal 2013-2014, Éditions de l'Arbre Vengeur, 2015
- L'Autofictif doyen de l'humanité - Journal 2014-2015, Éditions de l'Arbre Vengeur, 2016
- L'Autofictif à l'assaut des cartels - Journal 2015-2016, Éditions de l'Arbre Vengeur, 2017
- L'Autofictif ultraconfidentiel, Éditions de l'Arbre Vengeur, 2018
- L'Autofictif et les trois mousquetaires, Éditions de l'Arbre Vengeur, 2019
- L'Autofictif incendie Notre-Dame, Éditions de l'Arbre Vengeur, 2020
- L'Autofictif repousse du pied un blaireau mort, Éditions de l'Arbre Vengeur, 2021
- L'Autofictif nu sous son masque, Éditions de l'Arbre Vengeur, 2022
- L'Autofictif selon Proust, Éditions de l'Arbre Vengeur, 2023
- L'Autofictif sans égards pour le lecteur sensible, Éditions de l'Arbre Vengeur, 2024
- L'Autofictif travail son dribble en forêt, Éditions de l'Arbre Vengeur, 2025
