= Polina Barskova =

Russian poet

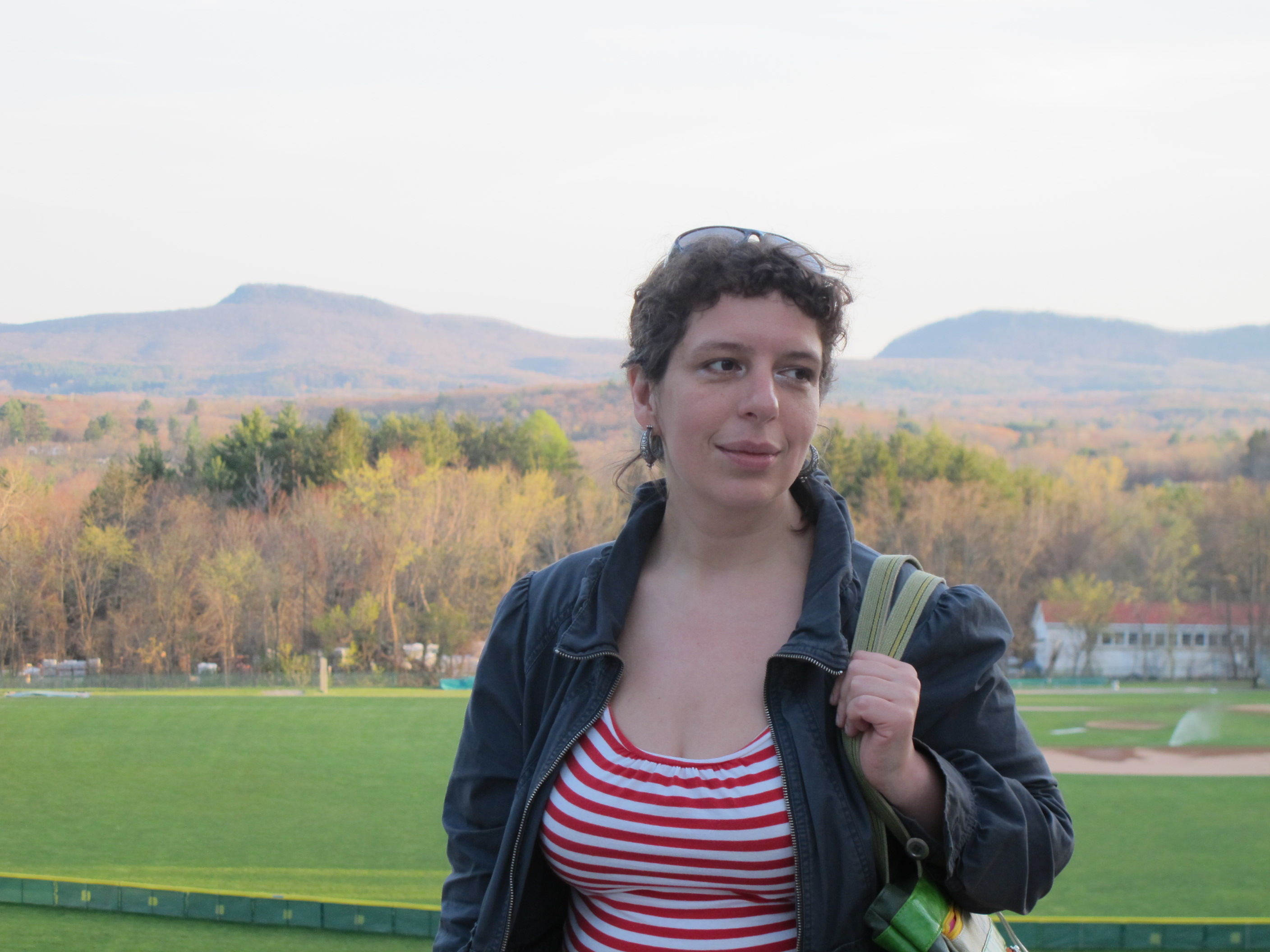
Polina Barskova, 2012, Amherst

Polina Yuryevna Barskova (Russian: Полина Юрьевна Барскова; born 4 February 1976) is a Russian poet. She was born in Leningrad (today St. Petersburg). Although her biological father was poet Evgeny Rein, she was raised by her adoptive father, scholar Yuri Barskov, and bears his surname. Her first book appeared when she was still a teenager. She received her BA from the Classics Department at the Saint Petersburg State University. At the age of 20, she left Russia to pursue a PhD at the University of California, Berkeley Slavic Department. She taught Russian literature at Hampshire College, and is now a professor in the department of Slavic Languages & Literatures at U.C. Berkeley.

She has published several volumes of poetry, and she was nominated for the Debut Prize and the Andrei Bely Prize in her native Russia. Her selected poems have appeared in English translation under the title The Zoo in Winter. Her work appeared in anthologies such as The Ecco Anthology of International Poetry, co-edited by Ilya Kaminsky, who translated a short volume of her poems This Lamentable City (Tupelo Press, 2010). She has done extensive archival work on the literature of the siege of Leningrad, resulting in the volume Written in the Dark: Five Poets in the Siege of Leningrad (Ugly Duckling Presse, 2016), which won the AATSEEL Best Literary Translation into English prize in 2017.

== Books in English translation ==
- This Lamentable City (Tupelo Press, 2010)
- The Zoo in Winter (Melville House Press, 2011)
- Relocations (Zephyr Press, 2013)
- Living Pictures (New York Review Books Classics, 2022).
