= Robin Patterson =

Canadian Artistic Director

Robin Patterson is a Canadian Artistic Director, and a founding member of Theatre Beyond Words: a Physical theatre company that specializes in the creation of original works using mask, puppetry, music, and mime. Patterson graduated from L'École Internationale de Théâtre Jacques Lecoq in Paris, France, then attended Simon Fraser University in Vancouver, British Columbia for her Bachelor of Arts Degree in English. After graduation, Patterson toured internationally for four years with Canadian Mime Theatre as its first female soloist, writer and director. Currently, specializing in clown, mask, and commedia techniques, she is teaching in the Dramatic Arts Department at Brock University.

== Theatre works ==
=== Potato People ===
Patterson conceived the Potato People series; wrote, directed and performed in many of the plays. Potato People is a series of non-verbal larval mask plays for inter-generational audiences. Its first show, Nuthin' But Trouble was produced in 1977 by Robin Patterson along with the other founding members of Theatre Beyond Words. Out of the 14-series of plays, Patterson created and directed Seven Potato More (1988), Suite Potato (1989), School Daze (1994), and Family Tree (1995).

In 1987, Potato People (a theatrical cartoon) has received the Citation of Excellence Award in the Art of Puppetry from UNIMA-USA.

== Awards ==
Robin Patterson received the Women of Distinction Award, May 2007, in the field of Arts and Culture from the Niagara Region YWCA.
