= Lytton Smith =

American poet

Lytton Smith (born 1982) is an Anglo-American poet. His most recent poetry collection is The All-Purpose Magical Tent (Nightboat Books, 2009), which was selected by Terrance Hayes for the Nightboat Books Poetry Prize in 2009, and was praised by Publishers Weekly in a starred review as "...fantastic and earthy, strange and inherited, classical and idiosyncratic, at once." He also has a previous chapbook, Monster Theory, selected by Kevin Young for the Poetry Society of America Chapbook Fellowship in 2008. Smith's poetry has appeared in a number of prominent literary journals and magazines such as The Atlantic, Bateau, Boston Review, Colorado Review, Denver Quarterly, Tin House, and many others. Lytton Smith was born in Galleywood, England. He moved to New York City, where he became a founder of Blind Tiger Poetry, an organization dedicated to promoting contemporary poetry. He has taught at Columbia University, Plymouth University in the southwest of England, and now teaches at the State University of New York at Geneseo. He has also translated a number of books by Icelandic writers, including Jón Gnarr, Kristín Ómarsdóttir, Bragi Ólafsson, and Guðbergur Bergsson.

== Honors and awards ==
- 2009 Nightboat Poetry Prize
- 2008 Poetry Society of America Chapbook Fellowship

== Bibliography ==
Full-Length Poetry Collections

- The All-Purpose Magical Tent (Nightboat Books, 2009)

Chapbooks

- Monster Theory (Poetry Society of America, 2008)
