= Cheer Up, Femme Fatale =

2007 poetry collection by Kim Yi-deum

- Author: Kim Yi-deum
- Translator: Ji Yoon Lee, Don Mee Choi, Johannes Göransson
- Language: Korean
- Genre: Poetry
- Publisher: Moonji Publications (Korean) Action Books (English)
- Publication date: November 30, 2007 (Korean) February 1, 2016 (English)
- Publication place: South Korea
- Pages: 168 (Korean); 80 (English)
- ISBN: 978-8932018256
- Preceded by: 별 모양의 얼룩 (A Stain in the Shape of a Star)
- Followed by: 말할 수 없는 애인 (Unspeakable Lover)

Cheer Up, Femme Fatale (Korean: 명랑하라 팜 파탈; RR: Myeonglanghala pam patal; lit. 'Be cheerful femme fatale') is a 2007 poetry collection by South Korean poet and scholar Kim Yi-deum, published by Moonji Publications. In 2016, an English translation by Ji Yoon Lee, Don Mee Choi, and Johannes Göransson was published by Action Books for their Korean Literature Series. The English translation was a finalist for The Millions Best Translated Book Award for poetry and was shortlisted for the Lucien Stryk Asian Translation Prize.

== Critical reception ==
Publishers Weekly found the collection "polyphonic" as well as "lived-in and corporeal".

Critics noted Kim's unflinching voice on a wide variety of topics including trauma, sexuality, and womanhood. Fanzine wrote that "Many of these poems are devastatingly funny—a comedy that is morbid, perverse, searing, and all the more powerful for when the bubbles of mirth pop to expose a grim reality." Sink Review found the book "rare in its ability to denature; rare in its ability to see restitution as a kind of homecoming; rare in how the female body is experienced". Words Without Borders called Kim a "poet's poet" and lauded her approach to "individual experience, sex and sexuality, and aspects of Korean culture and history not easily broached." World Literature Today similarly noted that "Yideum's texts can be read as allegories, tiny epics, and morality tales; this is a samizdat scrutinizing a country where everything—maybe anything—is for sale".

Critics observed Kim's writing of trauma and its relationship to the reader. The Bind noted that "the reader is at all times complicit in the rendered violence without possibility of redemption or release."

== Influences ==
In her afterword, Lee wrote that Kim's influences are Kim Hyesoon and Yi Sang, as well as Vladimir Mayakovsky.
