= Kim Kirim =

Korean poet and literary critic (1908–2000)

Kim Kirim 김기림
- Born: Kim In-son (김인손, 金仁孫); May 11, 1908; Haksung, North Hamgyong Province, Korean Empire
- Died: 2000; North Korea
- Education: Bachelor of English Literature; Tohoku Imperial University, Japan
- Occupations: Writer; Poet and literary critic
- Writing career
- Language: Korean
- Years active: 1930–?
- Genres: Poetry, Literary criticism
- Notable works: "The Weather Chart" (1936), "Wind Speed of the Sun" (1939), "The Sea and the Butterfly" (1939)

Kim Kirim (Korean: 김기림; Hanja: 金起林; May 11, 1908 – 2000) was a Korean poet and literary critic who represented Korean modernist literature in the 1930s. Kim wrote monumental poems such as “The Weather Chart” (1936), “Wind Speed of the Sun” (1939), and “The Sea and the Butterfly” (1939) during the Japanese colonial period. In pursuing a new spirit of poetry, he criticized sentimental romanticism in the 1920s and the movement of the Korean Artists’ Proletarian Federation (Korea Artista Proleta Federacio; KAPF), which based its literary theory and practice on left-wing ideologies.

Kim was one of the first intellectualists who introduced modernism to the Korean literary circle and emphasized rationality by means of the compressibility of poetry.

Being active as a literary critic, he introduced great Korean writers such as Yi Sang, Baek Seok, and Jeong Ji-yong to the literary world through his critique and papers. After Korea's liberation from Japanese colonial rule, Kim took part in the progressive Chosun Writer's Union along with the writers Jeong Ji-yong and Lee Tae-jun and called for the role of literature in building a new nation by its active engagement in reality.

== Early life and education ==
Kim was born in Haksung, North Hamgyeong Province in 1908. Kim went to Immyeong Primary School in 1914, and his childhood name was known as In-son Kim, his art name being Pyeonseokchon. In 1921, Kim quit Posung Middle School in Seoul and transferred to Rikkyo Middle School in Tokyo to continue his studies. In 1930, he graduated from Nihon University with a bachelor's degree in literary arts. After returning to Korea, Kim started his literary career as a newspaper reporter in the department of art and science in the Chosun Ilbo, one of the largest newspaper companies in the nation. In 1931, he temporarily returned to his hometown and concentrated on his writing while cultivating an orchard called Moogokwon.

== Career ==
In September 1933, he participated in the foundation of the League of Nine (Guinhoe), a literary association located in Seoul, with famous Korean writers such as Yi Sang, Lee Hyo-seok, Park Taewon, and Kim Yujung. While working as a founding member of the association, he played the role of the forerunner in incorporating modernism with the literature of the times and participated in introducing intellectualism with the writers such as Lee Yang-ha and Choi Jae-seo. Afterward, he was to resign from the Chosun Ilbo to study further in Japan, but Bang Eung-mo, the president of the company, allowed him to take a leave of absence and funded his tuition from the company's scholarship committee.

In 1936, Kim entered the Department of English at Tohoku University located in Sendai. In 1939, he graduated with a thesis on the theory of I. A. Richards, a British literary critic. After returning to Korea, he went back to work as a reporter in the Chosun Ilbo and later served as the head of the department of arts.

Meanwhile, Kim had no choice but quit his job due to the forced closure of the Chosun Ilbo in 1940 by the Japanese colonial government. In 1942, he worked as an English teacher at Gyeongseong Middle School near his hometown. It was known that Kim Kyu-dong, a Korean poet, was one of his disciples then. In January 1946, right after the liberation of Korea from Japanese colonial rule, he crossed the 38th parallel and moved from communist North Korea to liberalist South Korea. At that time, Kim's books and properties were all taken away by force, so he had no choice but to live in poverty. During the establishment of the South Korean government in June 1947, however, he crossed the border again to bring his family members who were staying in Pyongyang. He succeeded in moving to South Korea with three of his children first; his wife and the youngest son made it later, in the spring of 1948.

Afterward, Kim secured a teaching position at Chung-Ang University and Yonsei University and later became an assistant professor at Seoul National University, where he founded the New Culture Research Institute and worked as the director. He was reportedly abducted by the state political security department of North Korea after the Korean War broke out, and the time and whereabouts of his death have not been known until now.

== Literary career ==
Kim started his literary career by publishing several poems including “Away to the New Life” in 1930, when he was working as a journalist in the department of arts in Chosun Ilbo. In 1931, he made his debut as a literary critic by publishing the reviews, “Pierrot's Monologue” and “The Technique, Perception, and Reality of Poetry” and worked actively as a poet and critic. In 1936, he published his first collection of poems, The Weather Chart, which was known to have been influenced by T. S. Eliot's poem, “The Waste Land.” Kim issued his second collection of poems, Wind Speed of the Sun in 1939, of which some poems were characterized by intellectualism and its clever play of words. Meanwhile, he wrote three pieces of novels and plays including the mid-length novel, The Land beside a Railway (1935–1936), but did not receive much attention.

In the middle of his literary career, Kim's works showed criticism towards capitalism and self-awareness as an intellectual. This was due to the global trend of anxiety and realization of the inhumanity of modernization. During this period, Kim argued that poetry should carry the spirit of the times and that visual or pictorial poetry without firm ideas was another form of purism. He believed that poets were identified as the intelligentsia, a by-product of capitalist society, and were tasked with conveying the values of the times to the public.

The latter part of Kim's career started around Korea's liberation from Japanese colonial rule. During this period, Kim sought to meet the demand of the time by publishing writings that emphasized the interconnectedness between literature and reality. Also, he called for writers’ social involvement, which was viewed as the realization of his theory of “Total poetics”. That is, he claimed that poetry should deliver the spirit of the times by finding and pursuing the balance between modernist techniques and critical social awareness. In this light, the post-liberation era was the right time for Kim to put his conviction into practice, encouraging the poets to speak for the public in the community life. After the liberation, he published two collections of poems, The Sea and the Butterfly, in 1946, and The New song in 1947. The Sea and the Butterfly was notable for its transparent image of the limitations of life and the poet's willingness to overcome them. In contrast to the gloomy and private atmosphere of The Sea and the Butterfly, Kim showed a strong will to build a new nation in The New Song to beat defeatism of the time.

Kim also published several reviews and books. Some of his representative works include Poetics (1947) and Understanding Poetry (1950). The former was known as an important collection of theories of poetry that transformed the history of Korean literature by introducing Western imagery and intellectualism in the 1930s; the latter was considered as an enlightenment literature which was written on the basis of I.A. Richards' theory of psychology.

== Work ==
=== Major poems ===
- The Weather Chart (1936)
- Wind Speed of the Sun (1939)
- The Sea and the Butterfly (1939)

=== Collections of poems ===
- The Weather Chart (1936)
- Wind Speed of the Sun (1939)
- The Sea and the Butterfly (1946)
- The New Song (1948)

=== Selected publications ===
- Introduction to Literature (1946)
- Poetics (1947)
- The Sea and the Body (1948)
- Academy and Politics (1950), coauthored by Yu Jin-ho et al.
- Understanding Poetry (1950)
- New Lecture on Syntax (1950)

=== Translations ===
- Introduction to Science by John Arthur Thomson (1948)

== The Sea and the Butterfly ==
“The Sea and the Butterfly” (1939) is one of Kim's major works, published in the literary magazine called Women. This poem is included in the Korean Middle and High Schools’ literature textbooks to show the representative work of intellectualism. The poem illustrates both the longing and frustration for the new world by the contrast of two colors, blue and white. Also, the poem introduces two concepts that do not match with one another: the sea and the butterfly. The former represents the cruel and eerie reality of the colonial era or the new civilization of the times while the latter symbolizes the fragile intellectuals who are unable to put up with the external world. The poem shows a type of pictorial modernism, which was a new attempt in the Korean literary world at the time.

The Sea and the Butterfly (1939)

Because nobody told her how deep the water is,

The white butterfly is never afraid of the sea.

She descents, thinking it is a blue radish farm,

Then jadedly returns like a princess

With her callow wings soaked by the waves.

A blue crescent moon is chilly at the waist of the butterfly

Who is sad because the March sea hasn't bloomed.

바다와 나비

아무도 그에게 수심(水深)을 일러 준 일이 없기에

흰나비는 도무지 바다가 무섭지 않다.

청(靑)무우 밭인가 해서 내려갔다가는

어린 날개가 물결에 절어서

공주(公主)처럼 지쳐서 돌아온다.

삼월(三月)달 바다가 꽃이 피지 않아서 서글픈

나비 허리에 새파란 초생달이 시리다.

== Criticism ==
Influenced by the writers and theorists such as T. S. Eliot, T. E. Hulme, and I. A. Richards, Kim is considered to have learned the literary theory of Western modernism relatively accurately in early days. However, since he did not have a clear understanding of the cultural basis and philosophical foundation of modernism, his first collection of poems, The Weather Chart (1936), is criticized as experimental, which lacks a clear, unified theme. It is said that The Weather Chart reveals some problems regarding the form. Critics state that there is a lack of awareness in the rhythm and musicality of the language. It is assumed that Kim inadvertently disregarded these elements while he attempted to convey visual impressions through the language.

The Weather Chart, however, was believed to be successful in integrating ideas and senses and criticizing the modern capitalist civilization. In addition, Kim's last collection of poems, The New Song (1948), was recognized for its suggestion of a new direction in establishing a national identity, but was evaluated as lacking maturity as a work of art.

== See also ==
- List of Korean-language poets
- Korean literature
