= Crow's Eye View =

Cycle of 15 poems by Yi Sang

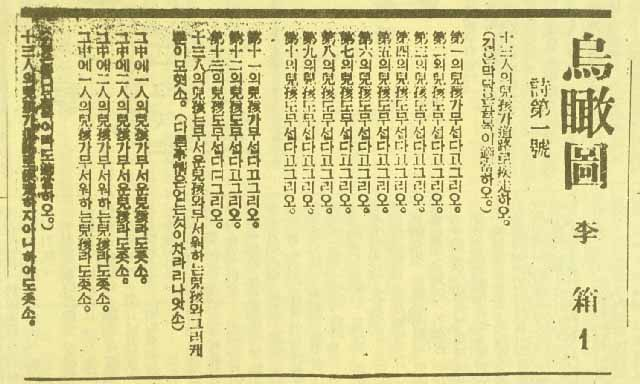
- Poem No.1, July 1934 test
- Author: Yi Sang
- Language: Korean
- Genre: Poem
- Published: 1934
- Publisher: Chosun Chungang Ilbo
- Publication place: Korea

Crow's Eye View (Korean: 오감도; Hanja: 烏瞰圖) is a 15-part poetry anthology written by Korean author Yi Sang. It was published by The Chosun Chungang Ilbo (조선중앙일보; 朝鮮中央日報) between July 24, 1934, and August 8. The anthology was originally planned to contain 30 poems, but only 15 could be published, due to criticism describing the works as too difficult to understand. The poems themselves are abstract, purposefully conveying feelings of anxiety, fear, and confusion.

== Origin of title ==
The name of the anthology is a play on the phrase "bird's eye view", an elevated view of an object from above. However, 鳥, meaning bird, is replaced with 烏 meaning crow. It is generally accepted that this is meant to further the themes of anxiety and fear that the poetry deals with, as crows are traditionally associated with misfortune or are considered to be harbingers of death. Since the expression '烏瞰圖' (Crow's Eye View) does not exist, it is said that publishers would ask if the title was a typo of the phrase '鳥瞰圖' (bird's eye view).

== Poem No.1 ==
=== Analysis ===
It is noticeable that the poem is not spaced at all. Since Korean is a spoken language, spacing is the most basic rule of speech. When not spaced, it is not only confusing to read but also difficult to grasp the meaning. Violating the basic code of such grammar implies the poet's rebellion and disobedience to the symbolic power of the world, and the desire for aesthetic freedom.

Usually, in the 1930s of Korea (which was Japanese occupation period), people would have had to live in despair wherever they went. Also, Yi Sang was suffering from lung disease, so he always had threats of death. The thirteen people who lost their sense of life and direction are self-portraits of his nation and their own image. This poem expresses fear, frustration, and faint hope of the colonial poet who had to live in a heartbreaking period of anxiety and fear in the paradoxical situation of 'dead end' and 'open end'.

There are various analysis of the '13' children. One of the most common analysis of the number is that it represents the 13 people at the Last Supper. The part where it says '13 Children were just gathered together like that as either frightening or frightened children (The absence of any other Condition were highly preferable)' shows the anxiety of Judas, who is destined to betray Jesus and the anxiety of other apostles who doesn't know who the betrayer is.

== Poem No.4 ==
=== Analysis ===
The common analysis of this poem is that the numbers symbolize geometric sequence. The sequence always converges to zero, which symbolizes death. Also, it can be related with his tuberculosis that he was suffering from. The problem relating to this poem was presented on College Scholastic Ability Test (South Korea) 2003.

== See also ==
- Yi Sang
- The Wings (Yi Sang)
