= Yi Sang: Selected Works =

2020 anthology of Yi Sang's poetry

- Editor: Don Mee Choi
- Author: Yi Sang
- Translator: Don Mee Choi, Jack Jung, Sawako Nakayasu, Joyelle McSweeney
- Genre: Poetry
- Publisher: Wave Books
- Publication date: September 1, 2020
- Pages: 224
- Awards: Big Other Award in Translation; Aldo and Jeanne Scaglione Prize for a Translation of a Literary Work
- ISBN: 978-1950268085

Yi Sang: Selected Works is a 2020 anthology of poetry written by Korean modernist poet Yi Sang (Korean: 이상; Hanja: 李箱), edited by Don Mee Choi and translated into English by Choi, Jack Jung, Sawako Nakayasu, and Joyelle McSweeney. The anthology's pieces reflect Yi's experiments in language during Korean occupation by Japan.

The anthology won the Big Other Award in Translation, as well as the Modern Language Association's Aldo and Jeanne Scaglione Prize for a Translation of a Literary Work. It is considered by some scholars of Korean studies to be the first major collection of Yi's works in English.

== Content ==
The book features several contributions to Yi's repertoire by each of the four translators. Choi translated a collage herself, along with three stories in collaboration with McSweeney. Jung translated forty-nine poems from Korean. Nakayasu translated eighteen poems from Japanese. McSweeney provided an afterword. Altogether, the works address life under occupation, capitalism, and the place of art amidst wartime. The works vary in form, ranging from essays to verse to visual puzzles.

At times, the translators also explicate their personal relationships to Yi's work, such as Choi's included essay "Yi Sang's House" which addresses how Yi and her father both experienced Japanese as a colonial language.

Four poems translated by Jung, "Brazier", "Morning", "Family," and "Street Outside Street", were published in Bomb Magazine's Fall 2020 issue.

== Critical reception ==
Many critics saw the book as a necessary contribution on behalf of one of Korea's most important modern poets. Ed Park, for The New York Review of Books, called the selection "generous" and said "it fills in other parts of the portrait" for previous works of translation. The Harvard Review lauded the unique work done by the translators to assemble and present Yi's work in English: "What can I say about these glimpses into this poet, who I would and could not have encountered were it not for this book?" The Nation similarly appreciated the work for bringing global attention to Yi's "global oeuvre" and "how he both mined and tore apart colonial grammar." Asymptote judged the book to be an expansion of "important earlier attempts to introduce Yi’s outsize impact in Korean literary history while forging new connections."

Some critics, like Park, questioned the exclusion of certain Yi works deemed important to scholars, such as "Wings" or "Encounters and Departures", which had already been translated to English in past works of translation.

The book is the first-ever work of Korean literature to win the Modern Language Association's prize for translation.

Nobel Prize in Literature–winning novelist Han Kang recommended the book, alongside other selections of Korean literature, in The New York Times for the "Read Your Way Around the World" series.
