= Joyelle McSweeney =

American poet

- Born: 1976 (age 49–50)
- Occupation: University professor
- Known for: poet, playwright, novelist, critic, professor
- Website: joyellemcsweeney.com

Joyelle McSweeney (born 1976) is a poet, playwright, novelist, critic, and professor at the University of Notre Dame. Her books include Death Styles (2024) from Nightboat Books, Toxicon & Arachne (2021) from Nightboat Books, The Necropastoral: Poetry, Media, Occults (2014) from University of Michigan Press, Salamandrine: 8 gothics (2013) and Nylund, the Sarcographer (2007), both from Tarpaulin Sky Press, as well as Percussion Grenade (2012), Flet (2007), The Commandrine and Other Poems (2004), and The Red Bird (2001), the latter four published by Fence Books. In addition to her books, she has published two plays; Dead Leaks, or, the Youths performed by Runaway Labs Theater in 2017, and The Contagious Knives performed at JumpStart Festival for New Writing. Her translations of Yi Sang: Selected Works (2020) were published alongside Don Mee Choi, Jack Jung, and Sawako Nakayasu by Wave Books. Her reviews appear at The Constant Critic and elsewhere, and her poetry has appeared in the Boston Review, Poetry magazine, Octopus Magazine, GultCult, and Tarpaulin Sky, among other places. Along with her husband Johannes Göransson, she is the founder of Action Books which has published a number of contemporary authors including Lara Glenum, Tao Lin, Arielle Greenberg, and Hiromi Itō. She graduated from Harvard College (BA magna cum laude) as well as MPhil, Oxford University; MFA University of Iowa Writers Workshop.

Recent writing has appeared in TYPO 31, Image Journal, and Poetry Foundation on Kim Hyesoon and on John Keats.

McSweeney was awarded a Guggenheim Fellowship in 2022. In 2026, she was awarded the Windham-Campbell Prize for Poetry.

On November 3, 2025, McSweeney became a Jeopardy! champion, with her final earnings totaling $17,700.
