= Action Books =

Independent press

Action books is an independent press housed at the English Department at University of Notre Dame. The editors are Johannes Göransson and Joyelle McSweeney. The press publishes form-breaking and hybrid work with a focus on texts in translation.

Action Books has had three books on the poetry shortlist for the Best Translated Book Award: Jeffrey Angles' translation of Killing Kanoko by Hiromi Ito (2010), Molly Weigel's translation of In the Moremarrow by Oliverio Girondo (2014), and Cheer Up, Femme Fatale by Kim Yi-deum translated by Ji Yoon Lee, Don Mee Choi, and Johannes Göransson (2017). Sorrowtoothpaste Mirrorcream by Kim Hyesoon, translated by Don Mee Choi, was a finalist for the 2015 PEN Award for Poetry in Translation.
