= Park Tae-won =

Park Tae-won may refer to:

- Park Taewon (1909–1986), Korean writer
- Park Tae-won (footballer) (born 1977), South Korean footballer
