= Mirror (Yi Sang poem) =

1933 poem by Yi Sang

Mirror (Korean: 거울) is a poem written by the Korean author Yi Sang. It was published in the October 1933 issue of Catholic Youth (가톨릭 청년, Volume 5). Other works by Yi Sang that also explore the theme of mirrors include Crow's Eye View, Poem No. 15 (오감도 시 제 15호) and Bright Mirror (명경).

== Structure and form ==
Mirror is a free verse poem consisting of 6 stanzas and 13 lines. Although the stanzas and lines are distinct, there is minimal use of spacing. Yi Sang often employs this technique in his other works as well, symbolizing a rejection of conventional grammar and established rhythmic norms.

== Content ==
Unlike lyrical poems focused on nature, such as flowers or mountains, Mirror delves into the self-conscious world, using the mirror as a metaphor. The poem contrasts the 'self outside the mirror' with the 'self inside the mirror,' highlighting the severe aspect of self-division, where the two selves can never truly merge. This represents the tragic modern consciousness of losing oneself and suffering.

The mirror, representing self-consciousness, serves as a space where one meets oneself. This poem cleverly dramatizes the relationship between the subjective 'I' and the objective 'I,' beginning with the simple statement, "There is no sound in the mirror." It lists ordinary observations made through the mirror, such as the two ears in the mirror not understanding one's words or the left hand unable to shake hands.

The poem brings overlooked aspects of modern life to light. The core of the poem, stanzas 5 and 6, presents the anxiety, despair, and tragedy of modern individuals. The unease of existing in the mirror even without possessing it, and the division and frustration between the 'self' in reality and the 'self' in the mirror, are key elements.

== Legacy ==
For Yi Sang, the 'self outside the mirror' maintains a strange and distant relationship with the 'self inside the mirror,' a separate entity within self-consciousness. These two selves must merge for a complete and normal life. However, Yi Sang's selves remain divided and opposed, leading to inevitable ruin. His tragic sense is rooted in this division. From a psychoanalytic perspective, Yi Sang's mirror motif expands beyond the issue of a divided interior to encompass the broader relationship between the self and the other.
