= A Flower Tree =

1933 poem by Yi Sang

A Flower Tree (Korean: 꽃나무) is a poem written by the Korean author Yi Sang and published in the magazine <Catholic Youth (가톨닉靑年)> in July 1933. It is one of the representative works in surrealist and introspective literature from the 1930s. The poem explores themes of self-identity, the desire for self-fulfillment, and the frustration of unattainable ideals.

== Synopsis ==
The poem begins with: "In the middle of the plain, there stands a flower tree." This flower tree is depicted in a barren landscape with no other flower trees around it, symbolizing the poet's isolated self. The tree, fervently blooming as if it embodies the poet's aspirations, cannot reach the ideal flower tree it imagines. This longing and subsequent realization lead the poet to flee, recognizing the futility of his efforts. The poem concludes with a sense of futile mimicry, reflecting the poet's failed attempts to attain his ideal self.

== Significance ==
A Flower Tree holds historical significance as it reflects Yi Sang's experimental approach to poetry during the colonial period. By breaking traditional grammatical rules and using free association, Yi Sang challenges conventional literary techniques. The poem's exploration of the split self and the impossibility of achieving one's ideal self resonates with the broader existential and psychological themes of the 1930s.
