= Kim Sowol =

Korean poet (1902–1934)

- 김소월
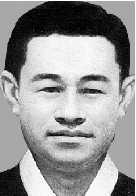
- Born: Kim Jeong-sik (김정식); September 7, 1902; Kusŏng, North P'yongan Province, Korean Empire
- Died: December 24, 1934 (aged 32); Kakusan, Heian'nan-dō, Korea, Empire of Japan (present-day Kwaksan, North Korea)
- Education: Tokyo University
- Occupation: Poet
- Partner: 홍단실 (Hong Dan-sil)
- Children: 3 sons
- Writing career
- Language: Korean
- Genre: Poetry
- Notable work: Azalea (진달래꽃)

Korean name
- Hangul: 김정식
- Hanja: 金廷湜
- RR: Gim Jeongsik
- MR: Kim Chŏngsik

Art name
- Hangul: 김소월
- Hanja: 金素月
- RR: Gim Sowol
- MR: Kim Sowŏl

Kim Sowol (Korean: 김소월; 1902–1934) was a Korean language poet famous for his contributions to early modern poetry. Throughout his life he wrote his poignant poetry in a style reminiscent of traditional Korean folk songs. The most prized example of this style was "Azaleas (진달래꽃)", the title poem of his sole collection of poetry.

== Biography ==
Kim Sowol, whose real name was Kim Jeong-sik (김정식; 金廷湜), was born on September 7, 1902, in Kwaksan, North Pyong'an Province, and died on December 24, 1934. Shortly after he was born his father became insane. This fact affected the poet's early life and may eventually have led to his own early death. His grandfather taught him classical Chinese and entered him in the famed Osan Middle School (also the alma mater of Baek Seok and Kim Eok) at the age of fifteen. There he became a pupil of Kim Eok (김억; 金憶), who remained his mentor for the rest of his life.

In 1923, Kim went to Japan, but he soon returned to Seoul, where he stayed for the next two years attempting to build a career in literature. However, he then returned to his native region, to the town of Namsai, where he worked as the manager of the local office of the Dong-a Ilbo newspaper. Though his poems continued to appear there, their quality deteriorated and Kim's life descended to habitual drinking and a reported suicide in 1934. In 2007, he was listed by the Korean Poets' Association among the ten most important modern Korean poets.

== Work ==
Kim wrote most of the poems contained in The Azaleas (1925), the only collection of poetry published in his lifetime, while he was still a teenager. After graduating from Paejae High School, he taught for a while in his home town and then went to Japan to study at a college of commerce. While there, he published several poems in Kaebyok and other literary journals. Poems by him continued to appear after his return in such journals as Yongdae until his sudden death.

His teacher Kim Eok published a volume of Sowol's selected poems in 1935. These included his memoir and a critical essay, in which he points out that the poet's true genius lay in composing lines in the rhythm of Korean folk song, thereby making his poems touch directly the hearts of Koreans. The magical charm of Sowol's lines can barely be recaptured fully in English translation, since the spirit of his poetry is conveyed in part through the sound of Korean folk tunes, which imposes an additional challenge on the translation of his work.

== Azalea and its alternative meanings ==
나 보기가 역겨워
가실 때에는
말없이 고이 보내 드리오리다.

영변(寧邊)에 약산(藥山)
진달래꽃
아름 따다 가실 길에 뿌리오리다.

가시는 걸음 걸음
놓인 그 꽃을
사뿐히 즈려 밟고 가시옵소서.

나 보기가 역겨워
가실 때에는
죽어도 아니 눈물 흘리오리다.

Translation:

You're sick and tired of me.
When you go
I'll bid you goodbye without saying a word.

I'll gather azaleas on Yak Mountain,
The burning azaleas of Yongbyon,
And strew them in your path.

Tread gently, please,
Step by step, softly,
On the flowers of dedication.

You're sick and tired of me.
When you leave
I'll not weep though I die.

In the poem a woman is speaking to a lover who may soon leave her. Cultural difference hinders understanding the context and one translator has provided several alternative versions to suit various moods or stylistic choices by way of example. In particular he cites the difficulty in finding a precise equivalent for the emotion being described, although the theme is a standard one both in the Korean literary and folk traditions.

Another commentator addresses the many possible interpretations of what is in essence a simple situation. It has been asked whether Kim Sowol was not being self-indulgent in writing melancholy ditties in the context of the Japanese occupation of Korea. One answer has been that turning his back on experimenting with foreign literary styles, in order to engage with traditional forms in “the purest Korean", and that at a time when the language was under attack from the Japanese and occasionally banned, was a form of cultural resistance. Moreover, some even see the poem as a coded reference to the Japanese presence and an anticipation of their departure.

On the other hand, David McCann believes that “social history or literary biography are not discovered in Azaleas; rather, the social history is found in what others have written about the poem.” In his opinion, the poem should be allowed to stand as itself; the proper business of commentary is to analyse what lies behind the comments of others.

== Publication ==
- Kim, J., 1975, Lost Love: 99 Poems by Sowol Kim, Pan-Korea Book Corporation: Seoul.
- David R McCann, 2007, Azaleas, A book of Poems, by Kim Sowol (Columbia University Publication): New York.

== See also ==
- Sowol Poetry Prize
