= Kim Yi-deum =

South Korean poet and university lecturer

Kim Yi-deum 김이듬
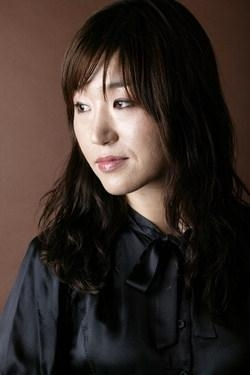
- Occupation: Writer
- Writing career
- Genre: Poetry

Kim Yi-deum (Korean: 김이듬; born 1969) is a South Korean poet and university lecturer.

== Life ==
Kim Yi-deum was born in Jinju, South Korea and raised in Busan. She studied German literature at Pusan National University, and earned her doctoral degree in Korean literature at Gyeongsang National University. She made her literary debut when the quarterly journal Poesie published "The Bathtubs" (욕조 a에서 달리는 욕조 A를 지나) and six other poems in its Fall 2001 Issue. Her poems have attracted attention for their sensual imagination and violence.

Kim was a radio host for "Kim Yi-deum's Monday Poetry Picks" (김이듬의 월요시선), which aired on KBS Radio Jinju. In 2012, she spent a semester at the Free University of Berlin as a writer in residence, sponsored by Arts Council Korea. Based on her experience there, she wrote her fourth poetry collection Bereulin, dalemui norae (베를린, 달렘의 노래 Song of Berlin, Dahlem), published by Lyric Poetry and Poetics in 2013. She also participated in the International Writing Program at the University of Iowa.

== Writing ==
Kim Yi-deum's poetry collections include: Byeol moyangui eoluk (별 모양의 얼룩 A Stain in the Shape of a Star); Cheer Up, Femme Fatale (명랑하라 팜 파탈); Malhal su eopneun aein (말할 수 없는 애인 Inexpressible Love); Bereulin, dalemui norae (베를린, 달렘의 노래 Song of Berlin, Dahlem); and Histeria (히스테리아 Hysteria). She also has a novel, Bleodeu sisteojeu (블러드 시스터즈 Blood Sisters). She currently teaches at Gyeongsang University.

Kim's poetry in translation has appeared in the British journal Modern Poetry in Translation (MPT)'s winter 2016 issue, "The Blue Vein: Focus on Korean Poetry." In 2016, her first poetry collection in English translation Cheer Up, Femme Fatale was published by Action Books. Translated from the Korean by Ji Yoon Lee, Don Mee Choi, and Johannes Göransson, the work was selected as a finalist for the 2017 Best Translated Book Award and the 2017 Lucien Stryk Asian Translation Prize. In 2017, more of her poems in English translation were published by Vagabond Press as part of Poems of Kim Yideum, Kim Haengsook & Kim Min Jeong.

Kim's poems are known for their grotesque and provocative motifs. Her narrators are often schizophrenic or have multiple personalities, disrupting the existing world order. Many of her poems feature single mothers, prostitutes, people with disabilities, divorced women, queer people, mental patients, beggars, the elderly poor, and other minority groups. She observes the order governing their marginalized world and seeks new artistic possibilities through it. She condemns unreasonable social conventions using language that might be described as hysterical, destructive, vengeful, and rebellious. Apart from such themes, the strong eroticism in her poetry is considered to have made important contributions to Korean women's poetry.

== Work ==
Poetry Collections

1. 『별 모양의 얼룩』(천년의시작, 2005) { A Stain in the Shape of a Star. Poem Sijak, 2005. }

2. 『명랑하라 팜 파탈』(문학과지성사, 2007) { Cheer up, Femme Fatale. Moonji, 2007. }

3. 『말할 수 없는 애인』(문학과지성사, 2011) { Inexpressible Love. Moonji, 2011. }

4. 『베를린, 달렘의 노래』(서정시학, 2013) { Song of Berlin, Dahlem. Lyric Poetry and Poetics, 2013. }

5. 『히스테리아』(문학과지성사, 2014) { Hysteria. Moonji, 2014. }

Essay Collections

1. 『모든 국적의 친구』(난다, 2016) { Friends of Every Nationality. Nanda, 2016. }

2. 『디어 슬로베니아』(로고폴리스, 2016) { Dear Slovenia. Logopolis, 2016. }

Critical Essays

1. 『한국현대 페미니즘시 연구』(국학자료원, 2015) { Study on Modern Korean Feminist Poetry. Kookhak, 2015. }

Novels

1. 『블러드 시스터즈』(문학동네, 2011) { Blood Sisters. Munhakdongne, 2011. }

=== Works in translation ===
1. Cheer Up, Femme Fatale (Action Books, 2016) (English)

2. Poems of Kim Yideum, Kim Haengsook & Kim Min Jeong (Vagabond Press, 2017) (English)

== Awards ==
1. 2011: 7th Kim Daljin Changwon Literary Award

2. 2014: 7th Poet's Square: Poem of the Year Prize

3. 2015: 1st 22nd Century Poetry Award

4. 2015: Kim Chunsu Poetry Award
