= Guinhoe =

1930s Korean literary group

The Guinhoe (Korean: 구인회; Hanja: 九人會), or League of Nine, were a group of influential writers who initially lived and worked during the Japanese occupation of Korea. Founded on August 15, 1933, and ending sometime in 1937 with the outbreak of the Second Sino-Japanese War, the Guinhoe wrote works primarily advocating for artistic freedoms and social reforms with a largely modernist perspective.

== Membership ==
The group consisted of:

- Yi Jong-myeong (이종명)
- Kim Yeong-deuk (김영득), art name Kim Yu-yeong (김유영)
- Yi Hyo-seok (이효석), art name Gasan (가산)
- Yi Mu-young (이무영)
- Yu Chi-jin (유치진), art name Dongrang (동랑)
- Cho Yong-man (조용만), art name Aneung (아능)
- Yi Tae-jun (이태준), art name Sangheo (상허)
- Kim Ki-rim (김기림), art name Pyeonseokchon (편석촌)
- Jeong Ji-yong (정지용)
- Park Tae-won (박태원), art names Mongbo (몽보) and Gubo (구보)
- Kim Hae-gyeong (김해경), art name Yi Sang (이상)
- Park Pal-yang, art name Kim Ryo-su (김려수)
- Kim Yu-jeong (김유정), art name Kim Nai (김나이)
- Kim Hwan-tae (김환태)

The group was founded at the suggestion of film director Kim Yuyeong and novelist Lee Jongmyeong. As time passed, it gained and lost members, with the final members being Yi Mu-young, Sangheo, Kim Ki-rim, Jeong Ji-yong, Park Tae-won, Yi Sang, Park Pal-yang, Kim Yu-jeong, and Kim Hwan-tae.

== Relationship with the KAPF ==
The group competed at the time with the Korean Artists’ Proletarian Federation (Korea Artista Proleta Federacio; KAPF) which was a pro-socialism group with similar intent, but with a focus on realism versus the Guinhoe's modernism. It is unclear if the two groups were strictly adversarial, though there are various works of criticism written by either group of the other.

The view that the Guinhoe were completely modernist has been contested since the 1990s, however, as the group did not tend to espouse a coherent agenda or doctrine beyond an initial anti-Imperialist sentiment, unlike the KAPF. Nonetheless, the general consensus view is that the Guinhoe broadly treasured the purity of literature and art for its own sake, in contrast to the KAPF's expressly pro-socialist agenda.

== Views and activities ==
Because of the largely informal nature of the Guinhoe, most of its members acted independently and were associated by virtue of having aligned artistic views and knowing one another. This changed over time, as some members like Aneung became politically pro-Japanese, while others like Sangheo were decidedly anti-Japanese. The Guinhoe had originally been formed with anti-imperialist sentiments, and those who eventually espoused support for the Japanese Empire came to be viewed as traitors to the group.

The Guinhoe published a magazine called the Siwa Soseol (En: Poetry and Novel), edited by Yi Sang in 1936. It only had a single issue published in March with a second planned thereafter, but was cancelled due to Yi Sang's departure for Japan in November. Yi Sang died the following year at the age of 26 from tuberculosis, and his ashes were transferred back to Korea and interred at Miari Cemetery. Following this event, the Guinhoe largely disbanded and were fully dissolved by 1937.

== In popular culture ==
The Guinhoe is referenced in the Korean mobile and PC game Limbus Company, with a fictionalized Yi Sang as one of the main characters. The group as a whole is depicted in fictionalized form primarily in the game's fourth chapter ("Canto IV"), with Dongrang and Dongbaek (based on Kim Yu-jeong) playing pivotal roles. There also exist characters based on Guinhoe members Park Tae-won (Gubo), Kim Ki-rim (known in-game solely as "Rim"), and Yi Hyo-seok (a character named Aseah).
