= DMZ Colony =

2020 poetry collection by Don Mee Choi

- Author: Don Mee Choi
- Genre: Poetry, prose poetry
- Publisher: Wave Books
- Publication date: April 7, 2020
- Pages: 152
- Award: 2020 National Book Award for Poetry
- ISBN: 9781940696959
- Preceded by: Hardly War
- Followed by: Mirror Nation

DMZ Colony is a 2020 poetry collection by Korean American poet and translator Don Mee Choi, published by Wave Books. Centered around the Korean War, the book combines poetry with other forms of media, such as photographs, drawings, and oral histories. Its title refers to the Korean Demilitarized Zone between South Korea and North Korea along the 38th parallel north. Choi's third book of poetry, it won the National Book Award for Poetry in 2020.

== Critical reception ==
Publishers Weekly, in a starred review, called the book a "stunning third collection" and "a feat of docupoetics, collage, and translation". It would later be included on their Best Books 2020 list.

Several critics, like those in American Poets and The Los Angeles Review, lauded Choi's experimental usage of language to interrogate the Korean War. Critics also examined the particular choices which Choi made in her translations of primary source material, viewing certain instances of untranslatability or mistranslation as a parallel to the inexplicability of Choi's subject matter of war, borders, and colonization. The Chicago Review of Books, in particular, noted that the book "imagines the DMZ as an abundant poetic and intertextual landscape, and an axis in relation to which she carries out her trademark translational, transnational, and transliteral experiments."

The book was a finalist for the Poetry Society of America's Four Quartets Prize in 2021.
