= Kim Ok (poet) =

Korean poet (fl. 20th century)

김억 (Kim Ok)
- Born: 1896; Jeongju, North Pyeongan Province, Korean Empire
- Citizenship: Korean Empire
- Occupation: Poet
- Writing career
- Language: Korean
- Genre: Poem
- Notable works: "The Song of Jellyfish" (해파리의 노래) "Dance in Agony" (오뇌의 무도)

Korean name
- Hangul: 김억
- Hanja: 金億
- RR: Gim Eok
- MR: Kim Ŏk

Kim Ok (Korean: 김억; 1896–unknown) was a Korean poet. He is one of the representative poets who led the early modernism movement in the Korean poetry scene, translating Western poetry and poetics and writing his own poetry. He published the first collection of translated poetry Onoeui mudo (오뇌의 무도 Dance in Agony; 1921) and the first modern poetry collection Haepariui norae (해파리의 노래 The Song of Jellyfish; 1923). He taught Kim Sowol as his student, and the two of them composed folk-poetry.

== Biography ==
=== Early life and education ===
Kim Ok was born in Jeongju, North Pyeongan Province, Joseon in 1896. In his childhood, he was trained in traditional Chinese classics in seodang (village school), and then enrolled in Osan School, founded by Yi Seung-hun, to receive modern middle school education. In 1914, he left to go study abroad in Tokyo, Japan. Even then, he had outstanding language skills. He was good at English, Japanese, classical Chinese, and, particularly, Esperanto. When his father died, he quit his studies and returned home to teach at Osan School. While teaching there, he met Kim Sowol as his student and maintained a close relationship until Kim Sowol died.

=== Literary career ===
In 1914, when he was studying in Japan, Kim Ok published his poems in Hakjigwang (학지광 Light of Learning), a journal for Korean students studying in Tokyo, and began his writing career. He actively introduced Western literature in the literary journal Taeseomunyesinbo (태서문예신보) founded in 1918 and published his poem "Bomeun ganda" (봄은 간다 Spring is Leaving; 1918). In 1921, he translated and published Onoeui mudo, known as the first modern book of translated poetry. In 1923, he published Haepariui norae, the first collection of modern Korean poetry. This book contains a foreword by Yi Gwangsu and Kim Ok himself and 83 of Kim's poems, which are divided into nine chapters. He published poetry collections Geummorae (금모래 Golden Sand) and Bomeui norae (봄의 노래 Song of Spring) in 1925 and became the editor-in-chief of the literary journal Gameyon (가면 Mask). In 1930, he took charge of the literature section of the Maeil Sinbo, and he joined the Gyeongseong Central Broadcasting Company (경성중앙방송국) in 1934. In 1946, after Korea's liberation from the Japanese rule, he was the executive editor for a publishing house named Suseonsa, and he gave lectures on literature in various schools. In 1947, he published his own poetry collection Meondong teul je (먼동 틀 제 At Daybreak) and a book of translated poetry Geumjandi (금잔디 Golden Grass). When the Korean War erupted in 1950, he was unable to flee south and remained at his home in Gye-dong, Seoul, and was abducted to North Korea.

In addition, toward the end of Korea's colonization under Japan, Kim showed pro-Japanese tendencies. In 1937, he wrote the lyrics for labor songs reflecting pro-Japanese sentiments, such as "Jonggun ganhobuui norae" (종군간호부의 노래 The Song of a War Nurse). He was also actively involved in other pro-Japanese activities, participating as a promoter of Joseon Writers' Association, a pro-Japanese organization, in 1939 and becoming a member of the cultural department of the National Full-Force Federation of Joseon. He was included in the list of 42 pro-Japanese writers issued in 2002, the list of people to be included in the "literary chapter" of the Dictionary of Pro-Japanese Collaborators announced by the National Issue Research Center in 2008, as well as on the list of 705 people who committed crimes against their own people announced by the Presidential Committee for the Inspection of Collaborations for Japanese Imperialism. In addition, his activities during Korea's colonial period were classified as crimes against the Korean people by collaborating with the Japanese and are included in detail in the Report on the Inspection of Collaborations for Japanese Imperialism.

== Writing ==
Until the early 1920s, Kim Ok mainly introduced foreign literary theories to Korea and pursued Western-style free verse, freely singing of his emotions. In the mid-1920s, however, he turned his attention to traditional poetry and forms, translating Chinese poetry, discovering folk songs, and composing Eastern-style fixed verse.

=== Earlier works ===
Kim's major work in the earlier years of his career is "Bomeun ganda" (1918). It maintains the four-meter form and the fixed pattern of traditional poetry but shows aspects of modern free verse in that it emphasizes the symbolism and significance of poetic language and gives shape to an individual's subjective emotions. Haepariui norae (1923) is his poetry collection representative of his earlier works that contain the characteristics of his poetry before his interest in folk-poetry. Most of the poems in this collection are not written in the classical Chinese style and rather have individualistic rhythm and free verse. In addition, he used classic poetic language (aeoche 雅語體) to sing about an individual's emotions and was praised for opening the horizons for free verse in Korea.

=== Later works ===
Kim stopped introducing the Western literary trends and poetics and translating Western poetry into Korean. Instead, he translated over 800 Chinese poems and began to think about applying them appropriately to the Korean language. That led to the creation of gyeokjosi (elegant poetry), which was "modern Korean-style poetry", influenced by Chinese poetry, and the folk-poetry movement. In 1925, his literary orientation shifted from foreign to traditional style, which became apparent in his poetry collection Anseo sijip (안서시집 Poetry Collection by Anseo; 1929). In Anseo sijip, Kim uses the 7-5-character rhythm and sings about the nature of Korea to restore the traditionalism of poetry. In particular, "Oda gada" (오다 가다 Come and Go) in Anseo sijip makes a perfect use of a fixed rhythm and emphasizes the poetic words such as "mountain path" and "apricot blossom", showing an Eastern worldview with a will to return to nature.

=== Translations ===
Kim not only published the first book of poetry translated into Korean, Onoeui mudo (1921) but also introduced foreign literary theories to Korea through "Peurangseu sidan" (프랑스 시단 French Poetry Scene; 1918) and "Seupinkeuseuui gonoe" (스핑크스의 고뇌 The Agony of the Sphinx; 1920) and even expressed his stance on translation methodology through "Yeoksiron" (역시론 Theory on Translating Poetry; 1930) and other writings, arguing that translation is another type of creative writing. He also propagated the use of Esperanto and even introduced the Indian poet Tagore to Korea through poetry translations, such as Gitanjari (기탄자리 Gitanjali; 1923), Sinwol (신월 The Crescent Moon; 1924), and Wonjeong (원정 The Gardener; 1924). After 1925, he focused on translating Chinese poetry and published translations, including Mangucho (忘憂草 Day Lily; 1934), Dongsimcho (同心草 Love Letter; 1943), Kkotdabal (꽃다발 Flower Bouquet; 1944), and Jinamyeongsiseon (지나명시선 Selection of Poems from Ming China; 1944).

== Works ==
=== Collection of complete works ===
- 안서 김억 전집, 한국문화사, 1987 / Anseo Kim Ŏk jeonjip (Complete works of Anseo Kim Ŏk), Hankook Munhwasa, 1987.

=== Poetry collections ===
- 《해파리의 노래》, 조선도서, 1923 / Haepariui norae (The Song of Jellyfish), Joseon Doseo, 1923.
- 《금모래》, 조선문단사, 1925 / Geummorae (Golden Sand), Joseon Mundansa, 1925.
- 《봄의 노래》, 매문사, 1925 / Bomui norae (Song of Spring), Maemunsa, 1925.
- 《안서시집》, 한성도서, 1929 / Anseo sijip (Poetry Collection by Anseo) Hanseong Doseo, 1929.
- 《안서시초》, 박문서관, 1941 / Anseo sicho (Drafts of Anseo's Poems), Bakmunseogwan, 1941.
- 《먼동 틀 제》, 백민문화사, 1947 / Meondong teul je (At Dawn), Baekmin Munhwasa, 1947.
- 《안서민요시집》, 한성도서, 1948 / Anseo minyo sijip (Collection of Folk-Poetry by Anseo), Hanseong Doseo, 1948.

=== Essay collections ===
- 《사상산필》, 한성도서, 1931 / Sasangsanpil (Writing on Sand), Hanseong Doseo, 1931.
- 《모범서한문》, 세훈, 1933 / Mobeomseo hanmun (Exemplary Epistles), Sehun, 1933.

=== Translations ===
- 《오뇌의 무도》, 김억 역, 광익서관, 1921 / Onoeui mudo (Dance in Agony), Gwangikseogwan, 1921.
- Rabindranath Tagore, Gitanjali / 《기탄자리》, 김억 역, 이문관, 1923.
- Rabindranath Tagore, The Crescent Moon / 《신월》, 김억 역, 문우당, 1924.
- Rabindranath Tagore, The Gardener / 《원정》, 김억 역, 애동서관, 1924.
- 《잃어진 진주》, 김억 역, 평문관, 1924 / Ireojin jinju (Lost Pearl), Pyeongmungwan, 1924.
- 《망우초》, 김억 역, 박문서관, 1934 / Mangucho (Day Lily), Bakmunseogwan, 1934.
- 《동심초》, 김억 역, 조선출판사, 1943 / Dongsimcho (Love Letter), Joseon Chulpansa, 1943.
- 《꽃다발》, 김억 역, 박문서관, 1944 / Kkotdabal (Flower Bouquet), Bakmunseogwan, 1944.
- 《지나명시선》, 김억 역, 한성도서, 1944 / Jinamyeongsiseon (Selection of Poems from Ming China), Hanseong Doseo, 1944.
- 《야광주》, 김억 역, 조선출판사, 1944 / Yagwangju (A Bright Gem in the Night), Joseon Chulpansa, 1944.
- 《선역애국백인일수》, 김억 역, 한성도서, 1944 / Seonyeok aeguk baegin ilsu (One Hundred Patriotic Poems Translated into Korean), Hanseong Doseo, 1944.
- 《금잔디》, 김억 역, 동방문화사, 1947 / Geumjandi (Golden Grass), Dongbang Munhwasa, 1947.
- 《옥잠화》, 김억 역, 이우사, 1949 / Okjamhwa (Plantain Lilies), Iusa, 1949.

5. Co-authorships

- 《소월시초》, 박문서관, 1939 / Sowolsicho (Drafts of Sowol's Poems), Bakmunseogwan, 1939.
- 《소월민요집》, 산호장, 1948 / Sowol minyojip (Collection of Folk Songs by Sowol), Sanhojang, 1948.

=== Works in translation ===
- 金億, 韩国现代名诗选集, 民族出版社, 2006.
- Kim Uk, Poésie coréenne contemporaine, Editions Autres Temps, 1991.
- 《해파리의 노래》 / Ким Ок, Песни Медузы, Открытые книги, 2004.
