= Pongbyŏlgi =

1936 short story by Yi Sang

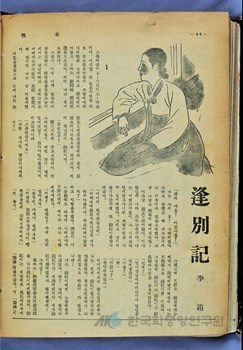
- Author: Yi Sang
- Language: Korean
- Genre: Short Novel
- Published: 1936
- Publication place: Korea

Pongbyŏlgi (Korean: 봉별기; RR: Bongbyeolgi), translated title A Record of Meeting and Parting, is a short novel written by the Korean author Yi Sang in 1936 and published in the magazine Women (여성) in December 1936. It is one of Yi Sang's representative works, reflecting his transition from poetry to prose during that year. The novel is autobiographical and depicts the author's relationship with his first love, Geumhong (금홍), from their meeting to their separation.

== Synopsis ==
At the age of 23, the protagonist goes to a B hot spring in Singaeji (신개지; 新開地) to recuperate from tuberculosis. Within a few days, he meets Geumhong at a courtesan house, accompanied by the innkeeper and a friend, K. They quickly fall in love, although the protagonist allows Geumhong to sleep with other men, including a French student and a lawyer named C. Despite this, they live together for about a year.

Over time, Geumhong becomes nostalgic for her previous lifestyle and begins to tire of her current situation, eventually disappearing. Two months later, she returns unexpectedly, giving the protagonist a two-person pillow as a parting gift before leaving again. The protagonist, gravely ill, sends Geumhong a postcard asking her to return, and she does, caring for him for five months before leaving once more.

The protagonist tries to move on, but learns of Geumhong's whereabouts from a mutual friend, Gisang. He hesitates but ultimately visits her, and they spend time drinking and singing before agreeing to part ways for good.

== Legacy ==
Pongbyŏlgi is a significant work in Yi Sang's literary career, capturing his life's realities after leaving his job at the Governor-General's office and detailing his relationship with the courtesan Geumhong (real name Yeonshim). The three years he spent with Geumhong, marked by his struggle with tuberculosis, played a crucial role in shaping his destiny and literary perspective. As such, Pongbyŏlgi serves as a representative piece of Yi Sang's literary output, embodying the realistic aspects of his life. The book was considered lurid and counterculture during its time.

Modern South Korean artists have created artworks based on themes from the novel.
