= Chongju =

Municipal city in North P'yŏngan Province, North Korea

Chŏngju 정주시
- Municipal city

Korean transcription(s)
  - Chosŏn'gŭl: 정주시
  - Hancha: 定州市
  - McCune–Reischauer: Chŏngju-si
  - Revised Romanization: Jeongju-si
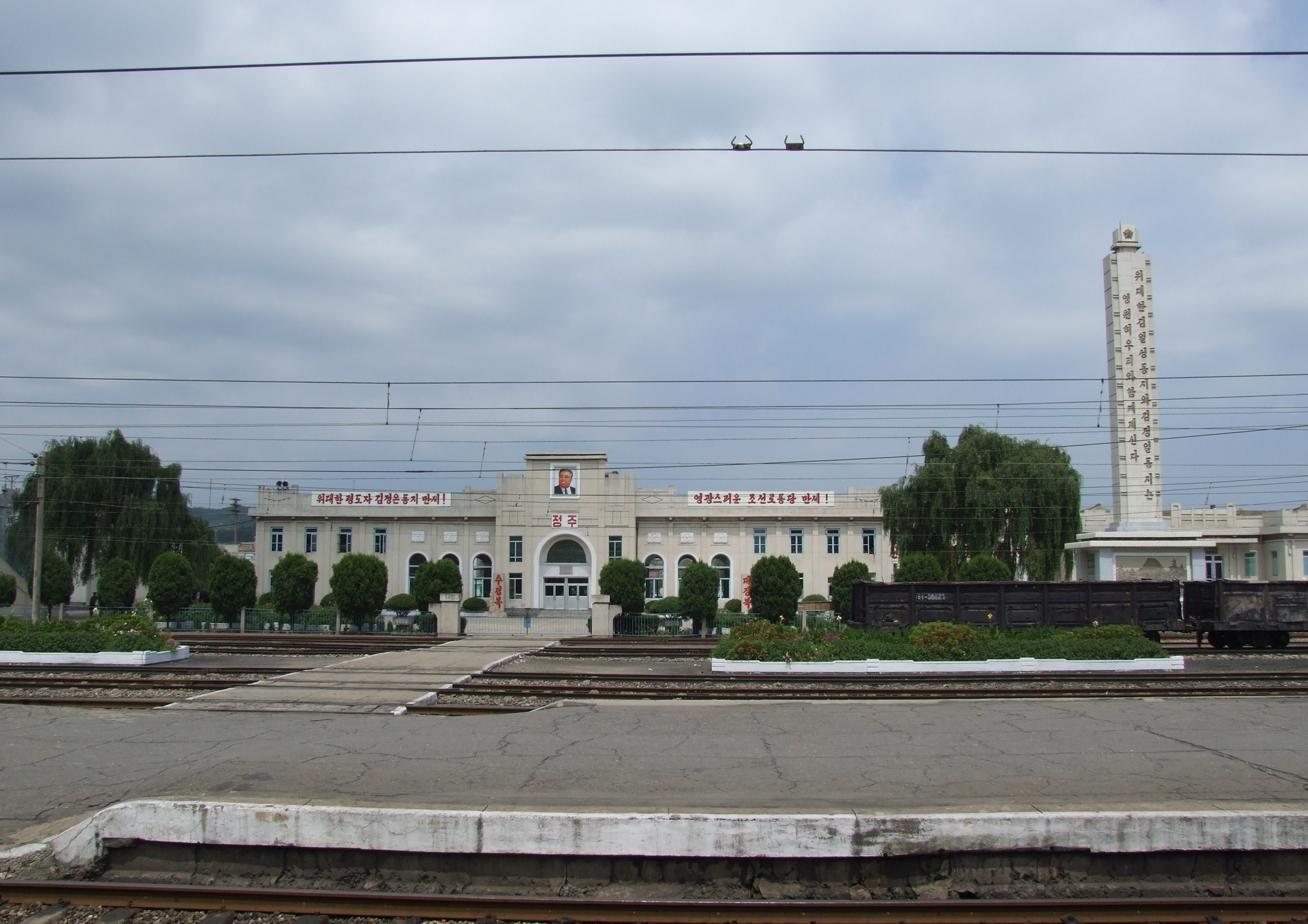
- Chŏngju Station
- Interactive map of Chŏngju
- Location within North Korea
- Coordinates: 39°39′N 125°20′E
- Country: North Korea
- Province: North P'yŏngan
- Administrative divisions: 14 tong, 18 ri

Population (2008)
  - Total: 189,742
  - Dialect: P'yŏngan
- Time zone: UTC+09:00 (Pyongyang Time)

Chŏngju (Korean pronunciation: [tsʌŋ.dzu]; also Jŏngju) is a si, or city, in southern North P'yŏngan Province, North Korea. Prior to 1994, it was designated as a kun or county. The terrain is mostly level, but mountainous in the north. To the south lies the Chongju Plain, where the hills do not rise above 200 metres (660 ft). Chŏngju also includes approximately 10 islands in the Yellow Sea.

== History ==
Artifacts from the Neolithic period and the Bronze Age were found in the Taesan-ri area (this was formerly a region of Seoksandong and Taesandong under the administrative division of Teokeon-myeon), showing evidence of human existence at the time in the area. When it was under the control of Goguryeo, it was under the subdivision of Mannyeon County, and it was under control of the Pyongyang Amnok subdivision during the Balhae period. After the fall of balhae and before Goryeo reacquired the area, the region was occupied by the jurchens. During the Goryeo period, it was known as guju, meaning "turtle province". In 1231, King Gojong of Goryeo promoted the region into jeongwondaehobu, and the region later became Jeongjumok. Jeongjumok was divided into Sucheon county and Kusong county, but it was soon again remerged as Jeongjumok. The region was demoted as Jeongwon prefecture in 1812. In 1895, it became Jeongju County which was under control of Uijubu.

== Geography ==
Approximately 40% of Chŏngju is covered by coniferous forestland.

== Administrative divisions ==
Chŏngju is divided into 14 tong (neighbourhoods) and 18 ri (villages):

- Aedo-dong (애도동)
- Kohyŏn-dong (고현동)
- Namchŏl-dong (남철동)
- Oryong-dong (오룡동)
- Osan-dong (오산동)
- Pukchang-dong (북장동)
- Ryongpho-dong (룡포동)
- Samma-dong (삼마동)
- Sangdan-dong (상단동)
- Sinchŏn-dong (신천동)
- Sŏju-dong (서주동)
- Sŏngnam-dong (성남동)
- Talchŏn-dong (달천동)
- Yŏkchŏn-dong (역전동)
- Amdu-ri (암두리)
- Chimhyang-ri (침향리)
- Hŭngrok-ri (흑록리)
- Ilhae-ri (일해리)
- Namho-ri (남호리)
- Namyang-ri (남양리)
- Osŏng-ri (오성리)
- Tokchang-ri (독장리)
- Posan-ri (보산리)
- Sema-ri (세마리)
- Sinan-ri (신안리)
- Sinbong-ri (신봉리)
- Sŏho-ri (서호리)
- Sŏksan-ri (석산리)
- Taesan-ri (대산리)
- Taesong-ri (대송리)
- Wŏnbong-ri (원봉리)
- Wŏryang-ri (월양리)

== Economy ==
Local agriculture is dominated by orcharding and rice farming; the chestnuts of this region are especially famous.

== Transportation ==
The city is served by both road and rail; it is the junction point of the P'yŏngŭi and P'yŏngbuk lines of the Korean State Railway.

== Politics ==
In February 2011, the city and others in North P'yŏngan had rare protests, of a few score of people, calling for adequate provision of rice and power. At the time, news of the Arab Spring was spreading via Chinese TV channels and phone calls with defectors.

== Notable people ==
- Baek Seok - Poet
- Hong Yun-suk (YeoSa) - Poet
- Kim Ok - Poet
- Ki-baik Lee - Historian
- Sun Myung Moon - Founder of the Unification Church and messiah claimant
- Pang Chol-mi - Boxer
- Yi Gwangsu - Writer and poet
- T.K. Seung - Philosopher and literary critic

== See also ==
- Geography of North Korea
- Administrative divisions of North Korea
- List of cities in North Korea
- North Pyongan
- Battle of Chongju (1950)
- Chongju Chongnyon station
