= Paek Sŏk =

North Korean poet (1912–1996)

Paek Ki-haeng
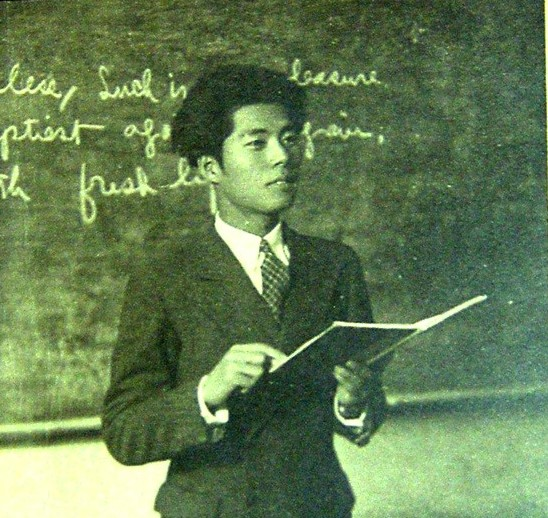
- Baek in 1936
- Born: 1 July 1912; Chongju, Korea, Empire of Japan
- Died: 7 January 1996 (aged 83)
- Education: Aoyama Gakuin University
- Occupations: Poet; novelist; translator
- Writing career
- Language: Korean, Japanese
- Period: 1934–1963
- Notable work: Deer (1936)

Korean name
- Hangul: 백기행
- Hanja: 白夔行
- RR: Baek Gihaeng
- MR: Paek Kihaeng

Art name
- Hangul: 백석
- Hanja: 白石, 白奭
- RR: Baek Seok
- MR: Paek Sŏk

Paek Ki-haeng (Korean: 백기행; 1 July 1912 – 7 January 1996), known by his art name Paek Sŏk (백석) was a North Korean poet.

He was born in Chŏngju in North Pyongan Province, and started his journalist career at The Chosun Ilbo in 1934. He published his first poem "Chŏngju Fortress" (정주성, Jeongjuseong) on 31 August 1935 issue of Chosun Ilbo. On 20 January next year, he published a collection of the poems he had written entitled Deer (사슴, Sasŭm). Even though Deer contained 33 poems, many of which were new, seven of them were already published in magazines or newspapers in slightly different forms. Until 1948, he published about 60 more pieces, but is not believed to have produced another poetry book.

In South Korea, the publication of his works was strictly prohibited for a while because he was labelled as a North Korean poet and a communist. However, since 1987 when a collection of his works (poems and essays) were first introduced after the Korean War, he has been widely re-evaluated by scholars and critics. He is now regarded as having opened a new face of Korean socialist modernism with a group of literary writers. In 2007, he was listed by the Korean Poets' Association among the ten most important modern Korean poets.

== Name ==
His real name is Paek Ki-haeng, and his nickname is Paek Ki-yŏn (백기연; 白夔衍) in 1915. After the defeat of the Japanese Empire in 1945 and the liberation of Korea, he changed his name to Paek Sŏk, and his main residence was Suwon. The name Seok is known to have been used because he loved the beginning of Takuboku Ishikawa, a Japanese poet.

== Biography ==
=== Early life ===
Paek Sŏk was born named Paek Ki-haeng in Chongju, North Pyongan on 1 July 1912, the son of Paek Si-bak (백시박; 白時璞) and Yi Pong-wu (李鳳宇). His father worked at The Chosun Ilbo as a photographer. Paek Si-bak was not wealthy, but he participated in raising building funds for Osan school. Yi Pong-wu was known as a neat and good cook. In 1918, Paek Sŏk entered Osan elementary school (founded in 1907) and his brother, Hyeob-haeng, was born. In 1919 Osan school was entirely burned down by Japanese military police for reasons that led to the March First Movement. Cho Man-sik, who was the principal of Osan school, was arrested and the school had to be closed for a year and a half. In 1924, Paek graduated from Osan elementary school and entered Osan middle and high school. He admired Kim So-wol, who was six years his senior, and got interested in literature. He was a top-scoring student, but he could not enter university because of financial difficulties. In January 1930, he won the first prize with his first novel The Mother and Son (그 모와 아들) in a literary contest hosted by Chosun Ilbo. That made him able to study at Aoyama Gakuin University with a scholarship funded by Chosun Ilbo. In university, he majored in English Literature and also studied French and Russian. Studying abroad, he enjoyed poems of Japanese poet Takuboku Ishikawa and was interested in modernism.

=== Adult years ===
In 1934, he entered The Chosun Ilbo's publishing department, having graduated from the university. He edited a sister magazine Feminine (여성, Yeoseong) and translated foreign works and papers. He started to work officially as a writer and a translator releasing an essay "Earrings" (이설 귀고리, Iseol Guigori) on 16 May 1934. Translating D. S. Mirsky's paper made him think about how valuable the Korean language is and how to preserve it with poetry. On 31 August 1935, he made public his first poem "Chongju Fortress". On 20 January 1936, he published at his own expense a collection of his poems entitled Deer which was a limited edition of 100. Deer consisted of seven poems which were already published and the others new. On 29 January, a gathering to commemorate the publication of Deer was held at Taeseogwan and eleven people including Kim Kirim and Shin Hyun-jung got involved as proposers.

This year, he resigned from the company and started for his new post as an English teacher in Yeongsaeng high school in Hamhung. In Hamhung, he fell in love with Kim Jin-hyang, a kisaeng, and named her Jaya. In 1938, he proposed to her that they leave for Manchuria and live free there. But, she refused proposal fearing that she would stand in his way. She left for Keijō alone. Then, he wrote Me, Natasha and a White Donkey (나와 나타샤와 흰 당나귀, Nawa natashawa huin dangnagui). In January 1939, he returned to Keijō and met Jaya again. On 26 January 1939 he rejoined Chosun Ilbo and resigned on 21 October 1939. He wrote travel poetry, "Traveling Western" (서행시초, Seohaengsicho) traveling Pyongan and Hamgyong. In 1940 he left for Manchuria and got a job at Economics Department in Manchukuo with the help of his friends. But he resigned six months later because of pressure to follow Sōshi-kaimei. In 1942 he worked at customs in Andong.

=== Later life and death ===
After the restoration of Korean independence, he returned to his hometown, Chongju. He studied children's literature and was criticized by the literary world in North Korea. In June 1962, he became a shepherd in a collective farm in Samsu. In October 1962, he quit writing as the criticism of reactionism grew intense. South Koreans and Japanese long believed that Paek Sŏk had died on the farm in 1963. However, it was revealed that he lived until 1996.

== Work ==
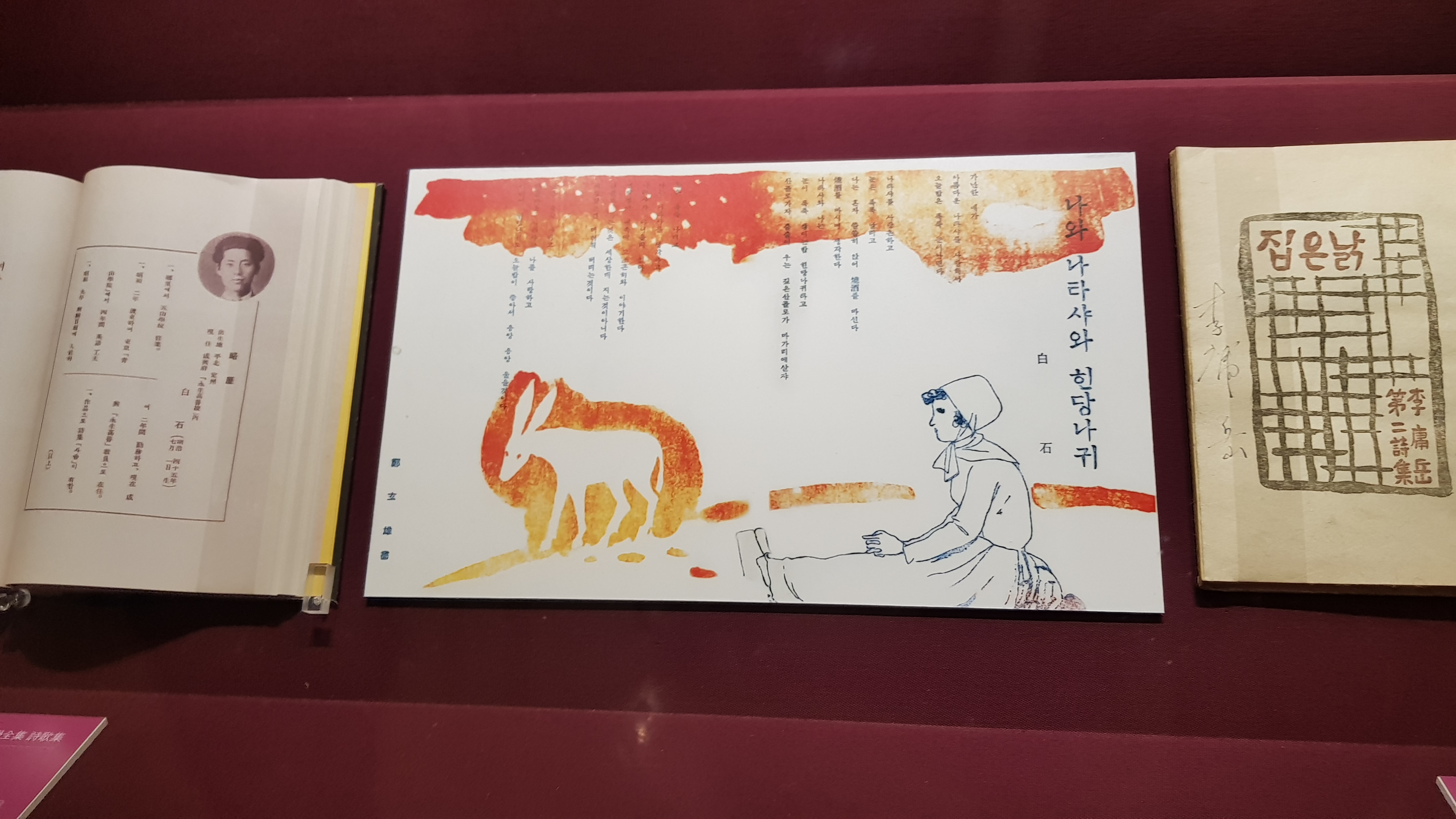
a collection of poems of Paek Sŏk

Paek Sŏk utilized not only Pyongan dialect and archaic words but also language from other provinces. He tried to preserve Korean rural culture and language by listing traditional plays and foods in his poems. To emphasize this, he used to set a narrator as a child. His poems are generally based on nostalgia for his home. In his poetry, home is described as a place that has no material affluence but embodies spiritual values. "The Folks in Fox-Lurking Village" (여우난 곬족, Yeounan goljok) shows such features.

- Deer: This is a collection of poems published on 20 January 1936.
- A total of 33 poems are divided into four parts in Deer. Part 1, "The Spirit of the Early Child", includes six, "Gazrangjip," "The Fox Nanjwa," "Hobang," "The Bonfire," "Goya," and "The Duckling Rabbit". The second part of "Water in Dolder-gu" contains nine, "Cho Dong-il," "Hadab," "Jumak," "Jeokgyeong," "Beauty" and "Out of Castle," and nine films including "Sanbi," "The Lonely Road," "Murru Bam," and "Noru.". The fourth part, "Beyond the National Allowance," contains nine episodes, including "The Story of the Day," "The Place called Ogeum Dung," "Jung Ju-seong," and "Tongyeong.".
- The upper copyright of the Deer is marked as "100 copies of the Poetry Deer Limited Edition at KRW 2". At the bottom of it, it says, "Copy and publisher Paekseok."
- "Me, Natasha and the White Donkey": A poem published in 1938 that transcends reality and sings of the will and desire for love.
- "Seohaeng Sicho": Paek Sŏk, who re-entered the Chosun Ilbo in 1939, announced it four times during his trip to his hometown of Pyeongan-do.
- Parwon (八院) : the a slow beginning, The Sidae (西行詩抄) the third a poet "parwon", The Sidae while traveling on the automobile for passengers of 'young a girl' on the car. Japanese occupation to see tragic life of Korean people living and come up with imagery information. It describes the situation inside and outside of the van in a realistic yet symbolic way.
- Namhaeng Sicho (South Haengshicho): This is a four-time annual publication published in the Chosun Ilbo that was published during a trip to Tongyeong, Goseong, Changwon and Sacheon in Gyeongsangnam-do.

== Academic background ==
- Graduated from Osan Normal School in Jungju, North Pyongan Province
- Graduated from Osan High School in Jungju, North Pyongan Province
- Gakuin Aoyama, Japan Graduated

== Related books ==
- a collection of poems written in the original book of Paekseok.
- Read immediately on white stone
- Korean Poets Read Again-Imhwa, Oh Jang-hwan, Lee Yong-ak, Paek Sŏk
- Paekseok's Pyeonjeon

== See also ==
- List of Korean-language poets
- Korean literature
- Culture of North Korea
