= The Wings (novel) =

Short novel by Yi Sang

- Author: Yi Sang
- Language: Korean
- Genre: Short Novel
- Published: 1936 (Magazine <Jo-Gwang>)
- Publication place: Korea
- ISBN: 89-88095-50-2

The Wings (Korean: 날개) is a short novel written by the Korean author Yi Sang in 1936 and published in magazine Jo-Gwang (조광). It is one of the representative works in psychologism or intellectualism literature from the 1930s. It expresses anxiety, self-consciousness, depression and ego destruction.

== Plot ==
The Wings begins with the famous phrase "Have you ever seen a stuffed genius? (박제가 되어버린 천재’를 아시오?)". This is described in the epigram written inside the rectangle in the introduction. The epigram can be interpreted through Yi Sang's 'mirror image'. The epigram can be divided into three parts with the greeting of 'Goodbye'. In addition, 'I' and 'you' appear in the epigram. If 'I' is interpreted as Yi Sang himself and 'you' as the reader, it can be seen as suggesting the reader how to read the novel "Wings". There is the phrase; "Block off the 19th century if possible. Dostoyevsky's spirit seems like a waste." This phrase can be interpreted as giving the reader advice to Yi Sang, referring to the interpretation above. Yi Sang defined the '19th century' as an old thing that did not reach the 20th century, so it should be sealed off, and made 'Dostoyevsky' the representative of the "musty" old era. Contrary to this, he confesses that he is one with Dostoyevsky and possesses a 19th-century soul.

The main character 'I' and his wife Yon-Sim live in a brothel, sharing a room separated by a partition. The front part of the room belongs to the wife, and the back part where 'I' lives has no sunlight. However, 'I' voices no complaints, content with the darkness where he is allowed to lounge endlessly. He lives off the minimal food that his wife gives him, and sees no point in being social or independent, as he finds everything bothersome.

When his wife goes outside, he goes to her room to watch the sunlight. His other hobbies include burning his wife's toilet paper with a magnifying glass, playing with her handheld mirror, and smelling her cosmetics. 'I' wonders about his wife's job, as she always went outside and also entertained many guests at home. On the days when she had guests over, 'I' had to stay hidden in his room. On these occasions, 'I' pretends to be sorrowful, which would prompt his wife to give him a coin. However, 'I' finds no value in these coins, as he does not go outside. 'I' tries to deduce what his wife's occupation is through observations from his room. During this 'research', 'I' smells extravagant food from the other side of the partition, while he is suffering from malnutrition. He still does not voice any complaints.

'I' finds out that the money his wife spends was given to her by her guests. He ponders for several days on why his wife's guests gave her money and why his wife gave him money. He concludes that the reason must be that monetary exchange brings pleasure, and starts wanting to experience this pleasure for himself. Thus he goes outside while his wife is gone, but wanders aimlessly from street to street until well into the night without spending a penny. When he returns home, he sees his wife with a stranger, but heads right into his room to sleep, fatigued from the outside world. After the stranger leaves, his wife shakes him awake angrily, but then returns to her room without a word. Feeling immensely apologetic and regretful for going outside, he goes to his wife's room and gives her the money from his pocket before falling asleep. The next morning, 'I' finds himself in his wife's bed, having slept in her room for the first time. He now understands the joy of using money - so again he heads out, then returns after midnight (when his wife's guests usually leave) and gives money to his wife, who lets him sleep in her room.

'I' realizes that he is out of money, and cries. His wife understands the reason for his tears and gives him more money, telling him that it would be fine for him to return home later than usual that night. However, it begins to rain that night, and he returns early to see something his wife would not have wanted him to see. 'I' catches a cold from the rain. His wife uses this as an opportunity to feed him Adalin, a sedative, while telling him that it is Aspirin for his cold.

'I' spends around a month in a sleepy haze. One day, he discovers the bottle of Adalin in his wife's room, and realizes her deception. In shock, he leaves home with the bottle and climbs a hill before eating six Adalins at once. When 'I' wakes up after one full day and night, he thinks about his wife's reasons for feeding him Adalin, wondering if she wanted to kill him. Then it occurs to him that perhaps the Adalins were for her own use, and what he had taken was really Aspirin. Feeling immensely sorry for doubting his wife, he returns home. However, he opens the door to see something he should not have. His wife rushes out of the room with ruffled clothes and clutches him by his collar, but her guest comes out of the room and carries her back. 'I' feels resentment towards his wife, who is submissively carried away as she accuses him of making love to other women and stealing things. Unable to retaliate, 'I' puts down his money at the door and leaves.

'I' finds himself on the roof of Mitsukoshi Department Store and recalls his past. He watches goldfish in a bowl, and the tired people down below. He finds it difficult to tell whether it is right for him to return to his wife, realizing their relationship was flawed and full of misunderstandings. The siren of noon cries, and his armpits, where his imitation wings had split out, begin to itch. He recalls his old wings of hope and ambition that he no longer has.

'I' wishes to shout, "Wings, spread out again! Fly. Fly. Let me fly once more. Let me fly just once more".

== Publication ==
Yi Sang was diagnosed with tuberculosis in 1933. After his main works, including Crow’s Eye View, he wrote The Wings, and traveled to Tokyo. He died in 1937.

This work was published in Jo-Gwang (조광) in September 1936. The English version of this work was published in 2001 by Ahn Jung-hyo and James B. Lee by Jimoondang Publishing Company.

== Significance ==
This work has historical significance in that it changed the literary technique of depicting self-consuming and self-disintegrating intellectuals of the colonial period and reflects the problem of social reality to consciousness.

In prior 1920s first-person point of view novels, the reports and confessions of witnesses and actual experiencers were not internalized by external expressions or planar constitutions. In this novel, these things were embodied through internalized experiments through the expression of psychology. It is considered a turning point of novel history.

The marriage relationship is a metaphor for the life in which the value of 'I' is neglected from daily life through the appearance of the husband being raised.

The paradoxical emergence of 'I' to overcome the obstacles of self-division and to seek self-reliance was shaped by experimental literacy done by Yi Sang.

In particular, the internalization of consciousness and psychology has a new significance in the literature in the 1930s, in that it did not have to ignore social reality by replacing the pathology of colonial society with the contradictions and conflicts of individual life stories.

== Adaptations ==
- The 1968 film The Wings of Yi Sang was directed by Choi In-hyeon. Shin Sung-il, who played the lead role, won the Grand Bell Award for Best Actor for his performance in this film.
