= Park Taewon =

North Korean writer (1909–1986)

- Born: December 7, 1909; Seoul, Korean Empire
- Died: July 10, 1986 (aged 76); North Korea
- Occupation: Writer
- Relatives: Bong Joon-ho (grandson)
- Writing career
- Language: Korean
- Period: 1929–1986

Korean name
- Hangul: 박태원
- Hanja: 朴泰遠
- RR: Bak Taewon
- MR: Pak T'aewŏn

Park Taewon (Korean: 박태원; December 7, 1909 – July 10, 1986), also known by his art names Mongbo and Gubo, was a Korean writer who moved from South Korea to North Korea. He is notably a grandfather of South Korean filmmaker Bong Joon-ho.

== Biography ==
Park Taewon was born in Seoul, Korean Empire on December 7, 1909.

As a student at Gyeongseong Jeil High School, Park debuted as a poet when his poem “Elder Sister” (Nunim) won honorable mention in a contest sponsored by the journal Joseon Literary World (Joseon mundan). He also won an award for fiction writers in 1929 with the publication of his short story “The Beard” (Suyeom) in New Life (Sinsaeng).

He entered Hosei University, Japan, in 1930 but did not earn a degree. He joined the Group of Nine (Guinhoe, a group that also included Yi Sang) around this time and devoted himself to fiction thereafter.

Upon the liberation of Korea from the Empire of Japan in 1945, he became a member of the Central Executive Committee of the Korean Writers’ Alliance (Joseon munhakga dongmaeng).

In 1950, Park crossed the 38th Parallel into North Korea, and became a professor at Pyeongyang Literature University. He continued writing. However, in 1956, he was purged and prohibited from writing, although his writing privileges were restored in 1960.

Park died on July 10, 1986, in North Korea. His grandson, through a daughter he left in South Korea, is the notable movie director Bong Joon-ho.

== Work ==
The Korea Literature Translation Institute describes Park's contributions to Korean modern literature:

A modernist writer who boldly embraced experimental techniques and meticulous craftsmanship, Park Taewon was primarily concerned with the aestheticism and the mode of expression itself rather than the ideas expressed. His early fictional works, in particular, were a product of his attempt to engineer a new writing style: “Exhaustion” (Piro, 1933) and “Forlorn People” (Ttakhan saramdeul, 1934) contain symbols and diagrams from newspaper advertisement; “Circumstances” (Jeonmal, 1935) and “Biryang” (Biryang, 1936), contain long phrases composed of over five sentences stringed together with commas.

Park, along with Lee Sang, rejected tendency literature, and stressed the importance of appreciating literature as a linguistic art, not as a medium for conveying ideologies. In the latter half of the 1930s, however, he came to focus increasingly on the customs and mannerisms of the time, and eventually abandoned his interest in stylistic invention. A Day in the Life of Novelist Gubo (Soseolga Gubossiui 1 il), serialized in Chosun joongang Ilbo from August 1 to September 19, 1934, is a semi-autobiographical novel depicting a series of observations made by a writer taking a walk around the city. Scenes by a Stream (Cheonbyeon punggyeong, 1936-1937), an elaborate portrait of urban manners and working class life presented episodically, is often regarded as the representative modernist novel of the 1930s. After Korea regained independence, Park turned to historical issues and problems of national identity, and began to write historical novels almost exclusively.

== Works in translation ==
- A Day in the Life of Kubo the Novelist in On the Eve of the Revolution and Other Stories from Colonial Korea
- Scenes from Ch'onggye Stream

== Works in Korean (partial) ==
Novels

- Does the Day of Enlightenment Break Over Hills and Streams? (Gyemyeong sancheoneun balga oneunya, 1965)
- Gabo Peasant War (Gabo nongmin jeonjaeng, 1977-1986)

Short stories

- "Exhaustion (Piro, 1933)
- Forlorn People (Ttakhan saramdeul, 1934)
- Circumstances (Jeonmal, 1935)
- Biryang (Biryang, 1936)
- A Day in the Life of Novelist Gubo (Soseolga Gubossiui 1 il),
- Scenes by a Stream (Cheonbyeon punggyeong, 1936-1937)
