= Yi Sang =

Korean writer (1910–1937)

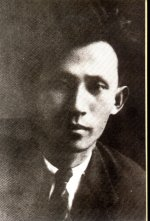
- Born: Kim Haegyŏng; September 23, 1910; Keijō, Keiki-dō, Korea, Empire of Japan
- Died: April 17, 1937 (aged 26); Tokyo, Empire of Japan
- Occupations: Poet, Novelist, Architect, Painter, Illustrator, Café Owner
- Organization: Guinhoe
- Notable work: Crow's Eye View; The Wings
- Movement: Modernism

Korean name
- Hangul: 김해경
- Hanja: 金海卿
- RR: Gim Haegyeong
- MR: Kim Haegyŏng

Pen name
- Hangul: 이상
- Hanja: 李箱
- RR: I Sang
- MR: I Sang

Kim Haegyŏng (Korean: 김해경; Hanja: 金海卿; September 23, 1910 – April 17, 1937), also known by his art name Yi Sang (이상; 李箱), was a writer and poet who lived in Korea under Japanese rule. Although he was a poet, he did not receive specialized education in Korean language or creative writing, and instead majored in architecture at Gyeongseong Industrial High School (경성고등공업학교; 京城高等工業專門學校), now known as Seoul National University of Science and Technology. After contracting tuberculosis in 1933, Yi Sang quit his job as a public official and ran a café, continuing his literary exchanges with the Guinhoe group (구인회; 九人會; lit. 'League of Nine'). He died in Japan in April 1937.

He is well known for his poetry and novels, such as Crow's Eye View and The Wings. Among them, Crow's Eye View received strong protests from the people at the time as not being a proper poem. Fellow poet Park Tae-won wrote in his memorial essay that people called Crow's Eye View "the sleep talk of a lunatic." Yi Sang's work contains various scientific symbols and terms, and is structurally very difficult to understand as it contains many experimental attempts. He uses wordplay through homonyms and also uses pictures in his works. He is considered as a pivotal and revolutionary figure of modern Korean literature.

== Biography ==
=== Early life ===
Kim Haegyŏng was born in Seoul, Korea (address: 4-6, Banjeong-dong, North District, Gyeongsŏng, Korea), on September 23, 1910, as the eldest of two sons and one daughter of Kim Yeun-chang and Park Se-chang. Yi's great-grandfather, Kim Hak-jun, held the rank of 'Jeong 3 Pum Dangsangwan' (정3품 당상관 관직: 도정; 都正) in the Joseon Dynasty. He lived in a very affluent household, but the annexation of Korea by Japan led to a decline in the family's fortunes. His father worked in letterpress printing for a palace before his birth, but after an accident that cut off his finger, he became a barber instead. Yi Sang was raised by his uncle Kim Yeon-Pil (김연필; 金演弼) as an adoptive son since 1913, as Yeon-Pil and his wife had no children at the time of his birth. Later, however, Yeon-Pil took Kim Young-Sook (김영숙; 金英淑) as his concubine and the son she already had, Kim Moon-Kyung (김문경; 金汶卿), became a legal son of Yeon-Pil. Yi spent time at his uncle's house even during his tenure as an official in the Government-General of Korea.

Yi Sang's had his primary and secondary education at Sinmyeong School (신명학교; 新明學校. 1917–1921), Donggwang School (동광학교; 東光學校. 1921–1922) and Posung High School (보성고등보통학교; 普成高等普通學校; 1922–1926. Donggwang School was merged into Posung High School in 1922.). He graduated from Poseong High School as a 4th graduate. He met his friend Koo Bon-Woong (구본웅; 具本雄) at Sinmyeong School. While attending Boseong High School, he became an aspiring artist with interest in art, and his academic performance reached a higher level. However, because his uncle insisted, Yi chose to enter Gyeongseong Technical College (경성고등공업학교; 京城高等工業專門學校. 1926–1929) in 1926. Yi majored in architecture and graduated from the college with 1st place honors in 1928. His first known use of his art name Yi Sang (이상; 李箱) was in the graduation photobook. There is testimony that Yi's art name originated from the art box he received as a gift from Koo Bon-woong. Since the art box he received was made of plum wood, Yi Sang (李箱) is interpreted to mean 'plum wood box'. Additionally, in his work 'Wings', he expressed his art name as 'Ri Sang' rather than 'Yi Sang'.

In April 1929, with a recommendation from the college, he got a job as a public official (기수; 技手) in the architecture team of the Department of Domestic affairs (내무국 건축과; 內務局 建築課) of the Government-General of Korea. In November, he changed positions in the government to work as part of the building maintenance team of the Department of Secretariat and Accounting (관방회계과 영선계; 官房會計課 營繕係).

In December 1929, he became a member of the Joseon Architecture Society (조선건축회; 朝鮮建築會; Joseon Geonchukhoe), which mainly comprised Japanese architects in Korea. Yi won first and third prizes in a design contest for the cover of Joseon and Architecture (朝鮮と建築; 조선과건축; Joseongwa Geonchuk), a journal issued by the Joseon Architecture Society.

Kim Yeon-pil, a father's elder brother who took care of the above growth process, died of cerebral hemorrhage on May 7, 1932.

=== Career ===
Most of Yi's works were produced during the 1930s. In 1930, he serialized his first literature work (a medium-length novel) December 12th (십이월십이일; 十二月 十二日) on the Korean version of the magazine Joseon (조선; 朝鮮), which was a magazine issued by the Government-General of Korea to promote their colony policies.

In July 1931, Yi released the following six Japanese poems on Joseon and Architecture:

- A Strange Reversible Reaction (異常ナ可逆反應; 이상한가역반응)
- The Scenery of Broken Parts (破片ノ景色; 파편의경치)
- The Amusement of ▽ (▽ノ遊戯; ▽의 유희)
- The Beard (ひげ'; 수염)
- BOITEUX · BOITEUSE
- The Empty Stomach (空腹; 공복).

Eight Japanese poems under the name "Bird's-Eye View" (鳥瞰圖; 조감도) on Joseon and Architecture (August 1931):

- Two People ····1···· (二人····1····; 이인····1····)
- Two People ····2···· (二人····2····; 이인····2····)
- A Nervously Obese Triangle (神経質に肥満した三角形; 신경질적으로비만한삼각형)
- LE URINE
- Face (顔; 안 or 얼굴)
- Movement (運動; 운동)
- Confession of A Crazy Woman (狂女の告白; 광녀의고백)
- Entertainment Angel (興行物天使; 흥행물천사)

In October 1931, he released a set of seven Japanese poems under the name "Three-Dimensional Angle Blueprint" (三次角設計圖; 삼차각설계도). The title of each poem is Memorandum on the Line 1 (線に関する覚書1; 선에관한각서1), ···, and Memorandum on the Line 7.

In March and April 1932, Yi released two Korean novels: Darkroom of a Map (지도의암실; 地圖의暗室) and Suspension of Business and Circumstances (휴업과사정; 休業과事情) on the magazine Joseon. He used different pen names on these two pieces: "Bigu" (비구; 比久) for the former and "Bosan" (보산; 甫山) for the latter.

A series of seven Japanese poems under the name Building Infinite Hexahedral Bodies (July 1932) (建築無限六面角體; 건축무한육면각체):

- AU MAGASIN DE NOUVEAUTES, (Note: lit. "at the warehouse of new things"(magasin means 'store', 'warehouse', or 'a place with many things', and nouveautes means 'novelty', 'innovation'.) Although some interpret 'magasin' as referring to a department store, the correct French term for it is 'Grand magasin'. Moreover, Baudelaire-an important influence on Yi Sang- used magasin as a 'warehouse of images and signs'. Thus, the tile can be understood as a warehouse collecting modern objects and phenomena.)
- Rough Map Under Heat No. 2 (Unfinalized draft) (熱下略圖 No. 2 (未定稿); 열하약도 No. 2 (미정고))
- Diagnosis 0:1 (診断 0:1; 진단 0:1)
- Twenty-two years (二十二年; 이십이년)
- The Publication Law (出版法; 출판법)
- Departure of Mr. Cha 8 (且8氏の出発; 차8씨의출발)
- Midday—Some ESQUISSE— (真昼—或るESQUISSE—; 대낮—어떤ESQUISSE—).

In 1933, he released the following Korean poems:

- A Flower Tree (꽃나무)
- This Kind of Poem (이런시)
- 1933, 6, 1 (一九三三, 六, 一)
- Mirror (거울).

In 1934, Yi released the following Korean poems and essays:

- 보통기념
- Three States of Blood Calligraphy (혈서삼태; 血書三態)
- Crow's-Eye View (오감도; 烏瞰圖)
- History of the Cane (지팡이 역사)
- Soyeong Wije (소영위제; 素英爲題)
- A Fall of Walks (산책의 가을).

Three States of Blood Calligraphy was a set of five essays:

- Oscar Wilde (오스카 와일드)
- Sensual Forgery (관능 위조; 官能僞造)
- Mr. Hyde (하이드 씨)
- An Evil Spirit's Appreciation (악령의 감상)
- The Third Blood Calligraphy (혈서기삼; 血書其三)

Crow's Eye View was a set of 15 poems, (Note: Yi originally planned 30 poems, but had to quit after Poem No. 15 due to massive complaints from his readers.) each titled from Poem No. 1 (시제일호; 詩第一號) to Poem No. 15 (시제십오호; 詩第十五號). Three poems from the series had an additional title: Poem No. 8 Dissection (시제팔호 해부; 詩第八號 解剖), Poem No. 9 Muzzle (시제팔호 총구; 詩第八號 銃口), Poem No. 10 Butterfly (시제십호 나비; 詩第十號 나비). Some of the poems from Crow's-Eye View were parodies of his early Japanese work, Building Infinite Hexahedral Bodies.

=== Jebi and Guinhoe ===
In 1933, Yi began coughing up blood due to tuberculosis, which forced him to quit his work as a public official. He opened a coffee house, Jebi, where he interacted with other writers and artists.

In 1934, Yi joined the Guinhoe (구인회; 九人會; lit. 'League of Nine'), a literary organization formed on August 26, 1933, to pursue pure literature, as opposed to the Korean Artists’ Proletarian Federation (Korea Artista Proleta Federacio; KAPF), an organization that pursued proletarian literature. The group recruited individuals associated with the cultural departments of daily newspapers, aiming for members who could withstand criticism from the KAPF. Mentioned individuals included Lee Tae-jun, Lee Moo-young, and Kim Ki-rim. To show its character as a literary circle, famous writers at the time such as Lee Hyo-seok, Jung Ji-yong, and Yoo Chi-jin joined the Guinhoe. However, although two individuals closely associated with the KAPF had established the Guinhoe to counter KAPF, the group's character gradually solidified into that of a simple social gathering. As a result, many of the early members of the group, including Kim Yoo-young, Lee Jong-myung, Lee Moo-young, and Lee Hyo-seok, withdrew. Park Tae-won and Yi Sang filled their vacancies. The Guinhoe then began to take on a direction different from its initial purpose. The increase in members with academic backgrounds, particularly those majoring in English literature, suggests that these individuals began to emerge as a force in Korean literature.

In 1935, Yi had to close the Jebi due to financial difficulties, and he broke up with Geumhong. Cafe Tsuru and Coffee Shop 69 in Insa-dong were opened and transferred, and after managing Coffee Shop Mugi in Myeong-dong, he healed in Seongcheon and Incheon right after he closed it. He then moved back to his family’s shack settlement beneath Beontigo-gae in Sindang-ri—a slum he later dubbed “the paulownia-hill ghetto”—where extreme poverty, recurring tuberculosis, and a slum fire that destroyed some thirty homes on 31 January 1936 formed the bleak backdrop for his next poems.

In 1936, Yi Sang edited the Guinhoe's magazine, Poetry and Novels (시와 소설; Siwa Soseol), published by Changmunsa under the aegis of Koo Bon-Woong. His "Street Exterior, Street Passage" (가외가전; 街外街傳; Gaoe gajeon) was published in this journal. That February he also issued the five-poem cycle Ruk-Dan (易斷) in Catholic Youth, breaking his habit of publishing only in summer and recording a record −20 °C cold spell and winter haemoptysis in Gyeongseong. After partially recovering and marrying Byeon Dong-rim in June, he unveiled the twelve-poem cycle Wi-Dok (危篤) between 4 and 9 October 1936. Of roughly seventy poems he published during his lifetime, about seventy-five percent (fifty-nine) appeared in serial form, Wi-Dok being the last. His short story "Diary Before Death" (종생기; 終生記; Jongsaenggi) and his personal memoir "Monotony" (권태; 倦怠; Gwontae) were published posthumously in Tokyo.

In November 1936, Yi went to Japan. In February 1937, he was investigated by the Nishi-Ganda Police Station in Tokyo on ideological charges. After being investigated for about a month, he was released from prison due to worsening tuberculosis. Yi was hospitalized at the Tokyo Imperial University Hospital, and died on April 17 at the age of 26. His wife, Byun Dong-rim, moved to Japan immediately after hearing that Yi Sang was in critical condition. After Yi Sang died, she cremated his ashes and buried them in Miari Cemetery. Later, according to Byun, she had asked him what he wanted to eat, and he died soon after leaving the words, "Sembikiya's (Note: A luxury fruit store in Tokyo) melon." Park Tae-won, a fellow writer and friend of Yi's, mentioned the following: "He loved girls so much, loved alcohol, loved his friends, and loved literature, but not a half of that love went for his body. His death is named as death from illness, but isn't the essence of this death suicide? Such suspicions become intense."

== Literary relationships ==
=== Jeong Ji-yong (鄭芝溶) ===
Jeong Ji-yong is a founding member of the Guinhoe to which Yi Sang belongs. In 1933, he served as an editorial advisor to <Catholic Youth (가톨닉靑年)>, playing a major role in promoting Yi Sang's poems. With the help of Jeong Ji-yong, Yi sang published works such as "꽃나무" and "이런시" in Korean in <Catholic Youth>.

=== Park Tae-won (朴泰遠) ===
Yi Sang and Park Tae-won were born around the same time and both hailed from the four gates of Gyeongseong, now known as Seoul. This shared origin is an important clue to understanding their literary worlds.

Both Park Tae-won and Yi Sang were members of the Guinhoe (구인회; 九人會; lit. 'the Circle of Nine'), which they joined in 1934. They first met at Dabang Jebi, a coffee house opened by Yi Sang in Jong-no 1(il)-ga. Their first meeting is estimated to have occurred in June or July 1933. Kim Ki-rim, another Guinhoe member, and Ko Un wrote that Jebi opened in July 1933, while Yi Sang's sister, Kim Ok-hee, mentioned June of the same year. The story of their first meeting is recounted in Park Tae-won's memoir for Yi Sang, "Yi Sang-ui Pyeonmo" (이상의 편모), written after Yi Sang's death. Park Tae-won was intrigued by Yi Sang as a poet and his poem "Movement" (운동; 運動).

Maintaining their relationship, Park Tae-won and Yi Sang collaborated with the newspaper Joseon-Jungang-ilbo to publish a series of Yi Sang's poems, Crow's Eye View (Ogam-do; 오감도; 烏瞰圖), and Park's novel, A Day in the Life of Novelist Mr. Gubo (소설가 구보씨의 일일). Yi Sang also created illustrations for Park Tae-won's novel. Despite facing harsh criticism for the abstruseness of their literature, they continued their literary endeavors. After Yi Sang's admission to Guinhoe in the fall of 1934, they focused on the publication of the bulletin "Poet and Novel" (시와 소설).

They also shared literary themes in works like Yi Sang's poem "Movement" (운동; 運動) and Park Tae-won's short story "Bangranjang Juin (방랑장 주인; 芳蘭莊 主人)", both written in a single sentence. Park Tae-won's novels often repeat similar themes and patterns, one of which is A Novel Report on Yi Sang's Private Life, including works such as Aeyog (애욕, 1934), Bogo (보고, 1936), Yi Sang-ui Bilyeon (이상의 비련, 1936), Yeomcheon (염천, 1938), and Jebi (제비, 1939).

The main character of the novel Aeyog (1934) is believed to be modeled after Yi Sang, hinted by Yi Sang's pen name "Hae-yung," who drew an illustration for A Day in the Life of Novelist Mr. Gubo. Jebi (1939) is a novel based on the tea house 'Jebi' run by Yi Sang, illustrated by Park Tae-won.

Park Tae-won and Yi Sang were inseparable, sharing not only their literary endeavors but also their indulgences, depressions, and moments of decadence. Park Tae-won's house in Da-dong was a refuge for Yi Sang whenever he was beaten by Geum-Hong, who lived with him. However, their close relationship ended with Yi Sang's death in Tokyo.

=== Kim Ki-rim (金起林) ===
Kim Ki-rim, a poet and a newspaper reporter at the Chosun Ilbo, was one of the founding members of Guinhoe. Yi Sang was initially introduced to Kim by Park Tae-won. During their first encounter, they discussed Jules Renard, Salvador Dalí, and René Clair. Kim became interested in Yi because of their shared aesthetic affinity for surrealism. Yi Sang designed the cover of Kim Ki-rim's poetry collection, "Gisangdo" (기상도).

Between 1936 and 1937, Yi Sang sent seven letters to Kim Ki-rim, which are still preserved today under the title 'To Kim Ki-rim'. During this period, Yi moved to mainland Japan and was close to death due to tuberculosis. These letters reflect Yi's everyday thoughts and experiences. For instance, in the fourth letter, Yi mentions René Clair, the French filmmaker, and criticizes his movie, "The Ghost Goes West." The letters also highlight their close relationship. Yi frequently discussed the progress of his works, such as "The Wings" (날개) and "Diary Before Death" (Jongsaenggi; 종생기; 終生記), requesting Kim's opinions on them. Additionally, Yi commented on a paper by Choi Jae-seo, a Korean literature critic, who criticized works like "The Wings (날개)".

After Yi Sang's death, Kim Ki-rim wrote a tribute titled "Memories of the Late Yi Sang" (고 이상의 추억). In this tribute, he recognized Yi's death as a "tragedy of a reduced-printed era", placing Yi's death within a historical context. In 1949, Kim Ki-rim collected Yi Sang's works and published the first collected works, "Yi Sang Seon-jip" (이상선집; 李箱選集).

=== Koo Bon-Woong (具本雄) ===
Koo Bon-Woong was a painter and art critic who graduated from the Taiheiyo Art School(太平洋美術 學校). He first met Yi Sang at Sinmyeong School. Koo, who had a hunchback, attended school intermittently due to health problems and ended up graduating alongside Yi Sang, who was four years younger. Teased because of his hunchback, Koo developed a keen interest in art. Similarly, Yi Sang, who also had a strong interest in art, became friends with Koo, supporting and respecting him. This marked the beginning of their relationship, which continued into adulthood.

In 1933, to care for Yi Sang, who had quit his job as a public official due to illness, Koo Bon-Woong took him to Baechon Hot Springs in Hwanghae Province. Baechon Hot Springs is also known as the place where Yi Sang first met Geum-Hong. After Yi Sang's health slightly improved, he and Geum-Hong returned to Seoul (Koo returned before them) and opened a coffee shop called "Jebi". It is said that Koo Bon-Woong's painting, "Still Object with a Doll" (인형이 있는 정물, 71.4 cm x 89.4 cm), was displayed in this café.

After Jebi closed down, Yi Sang had no means of livelihood. He eventually found work as a proofreader at Koo Bon-Woong's printing press. There, with Koo's assistance, Yi Sang founded a literary magazine called "Poetry and Novel" (시와 소설), featuring works from members of Guinhoe. Although only the inaugural issue was produced due to a lack of active participation from the members, Yi Sang's postscript in the magazine shows that Koo Bon-Woong was a fervent supporter of Yi Sang's artistic activities.

Furthermore, Yi Sang's last lover, Byun Dong-Rim, was the younger sister of Koo Bon-Woong's stepmother. This somewhat unusual relationship was due to the fact that Koo's stepmother was not significantly older than Koo. Yi Sang and Koo were close, often spending time together at 'Ugodang,' Koo's studio and office, as coworkers. Yi Sang frequently drew pictures there. When Yi Sang was struggling with a series of business failures, Koo got him a job at a publishing company, Changmunsa, founded by his father in 1935. Koo Bon-Woong painted his friend Yi Sang in a well-known work called "Portrait of a Friend" (우인상).

== Relationships with women ==
In Yi Sang's poetry, women appear in various forms, but they commonly exhibit behaviors of fleeing from or becoming disconnected from the poetic speaker. This reflects Yi Sang's feelings of anxiety and alienation in his relationships with women. In his poems, women are always drifting away, leaving the speaker with a sense of loss and loneliness. This portrayal poetically expresses the complex relationships and inner conflicts Yi Sang experienced. The motifs of women in Yi Sang's poetry can be largely identified as three figures: Geum-Hong, Kwon Soon-ok, and Byeon Dong-lim/Byun Dong-Rim. Particularly, women modeled after Geum-Hong tend to flee from the poetic speaker. Ultimately, the women depicted by Yi Sang can be interpreted as symbols of his deep-seated loneliness and sense of disconnection.

=== Geum-Hong (錦紅) ===
In 1933, 23-year-old Yi Sang first encountered Geum-Hong, who was a kisaeng (기생; 妓生), during a trip to Baechon Hot Springs (배천온천; 白川温泉) to recuperate from tuberculosis. They developed a romantic relationship and managed a coffee house called 'Jebi' on Jong-no 1st Street, Gyeongseong. Yi Sang designated Geum-Hong as the manager of the coffee house, and they lived together for an estimated two years. However, their relationship was tumultuous due to financial difficulties. Geum-Hong frequently stayed out, and Yi Sang would lash out at her by mentioning her previous life as a kisaeng. As a result, she would physically beat him and often run away from home, leading to their eventual breakup. Consequently, in September 1935, the coffee house Jebi closed down.

Their love story is depicted in Yi Sang's novel, 'Bongbyeolgi' (봉별기; 逢別記), which means 'A Story of Meeting and Parting'. Geum-Hong is also implicitly portrayed in his short story 'The Wings' (날개) under the name Yeon-shim-i (연심이), her real name. Furthermore, Yi Sang's poems reveal the dynamics between him and Geum-Hong. In the poems "危篤:追求" and "明鏡", Geum-Hong is always trying to escape from Yi Sang, which fills him with sorrow each time. However, in the poem "ㆍ素ㆍ榮ㆍ爲ㆍ題ㆍ" and the novel "The Wings", despite his sadness, Yi Sang does not deeply dwell on Geum-Hong's acts of infidelity and prostitution. These aspects highlight the unique nature of their relationship.

=== Gwon Sun-ok ===
After the failure of the coffeehouse Jebi, Yi Sang took over the café 'Tsuru' (Hangul: 쓰루, Kanji: 鶴) by mortgaging his parents' house. He recruited Kwon Soon-ok, who had worked as a waitress at another café, 'Angel'. Kwon Soon-ok was highly educated and had broad interactions with other writers, such as Jeong In-taek. While Yi Sang fell for her, their romantic relationship never fully developed. Jeong In-taek had a secret crush on her, leading to a love triangle. Jeong In-taek even attempted suicide to win her favor, and after this incident, Kwon Soon-ok and Jeong In-taek married. Ironically, Yi Sang presided over their wedding ceremony. Following Jeong In-taek's death, Kwon Soon-ok remarried Park Tae-won.

=== Byeon Dong-rim (卞東琳) ===
Byeon Dong-rim (변동림), a writer introduced to Yi Sang by Gu Bon-woong, became his wife. Yi Sang and Byeon Dong-rim met in 1936 through this introduction. Only three months into their marriage, Yi Sang left for Tokyo alone, where his health sharply deteriorated. He was transferred to Tokyo Imperial University Hospital in a severe state, worsened by a sudden arrest. Upon hearing the news, Byeon Dong-rim traveled to Tokyo within two days. After just four months of marriage, Yi Sang died in her presence.

Their feelings towards each other can be traced through Yi Sang's "Tokyo" (Donggyeong; 동경; 東京) and Byeon Dong-rim's "Moonlight Heart" (월하의 마음; 月下의 마음). According to Byeon Dong-rim's essay "Moonlight Heart," shortly before his death, Yi Sang reportedly said he wanted to eat "Sembikiya's melon." Byeon Dong-rim went to buy the melon to fulfill Yi Sang's final request, but sadly, Yi Sang did not get to eat it.

In later years, Byeon Dong-rim reflected on Yi Sang's death, stating, "He lived a most brilliant, enchanted life. The 27 years he spent on this earth were enough time for a genius to fully blossom and then fade away."

== Perception and legacy ==
Yi Sang is renowned as perhaps the most famous avant-garde writer of the colonial era. His work experiments with language, interiority, and the separation from oneself and the external world. His poetry was influenced by Western literary concepts such as Dadaism and Surrealism. In particular, the "Crow's Eye View" reject semantic interpretation, and the text itself functions as an event equivalent to reality. This embodies text reality, a core characteristic of the avant-garde, and defines the work as a performance that directly transforms reality, not just a reflection. Direct references to Western literature are rare in his writings, but in "Three-Dimensional Angle Blueprint (三次角設計図)", there is a notable mention that suggests such influence. The inclusion of Faust and Mephisto in this piece has been interpreted by some as being inspired by Faust, the famous work by German writer Goethe. Yi's background in architecture also influenced his work, often incorporating the languages of mathematics and architecture, including lines, dots, number systems, equations, and diagrams. Yi Sang possessed a certain familiarity with Christianity, which is reflected in his literary works. References to Jesus appear frequently, and he also contributed writings to a Catholic magazine. In his poem cycle "Two People (二人)", he mentions the Mount of Olives, where, according to the Bible, Jesus prayed for forty days. The poem notably draws a contrast between the image of Jesus and that of Al Capone, the American mafia figure active during the 1930s.

His literary legacy is marked by his modernist tendencies, evident throughout his body of work. His poems reveal the desolate internal landscape of modern humanity. For example, "Crow's Eye View Poem No. 1" (오감도 시제1호) uses an anti-realist technique to condense themes of anxiety and fear. His stories dismantle traditional fiction forms to depict the conditions of modern life. The Wings, for instance, employs a stream-of-consciousness technique to express the alienation of modern individuals, who are fragmented commodities unable to connect with quotidian realities.

Yi Sang did not receive much recognition for his writing during his lifetime. However, his works began to be reprinted in the 1950s. His reputation soared in the 1970s, and the Yi Sang Literary Award was established in 1977. In 2007, he was listed by the Korean Poets' Association among the ten most important modern Korean poets. His most famous short story is "The Wings" ("Nalgae", Korean: 날개), and his poem "Crow's Eye View" is also well-known.

In 1960, a previously unpublished manuscript written in Japanese by Yi Sang was discovered and introduced by literary critic Jo Yeon-hyeon through the magazines Literary Thought (Munhak Sasang) and Contemporary Literature (Hyundae Munhak). The manuscript, written in vertical Japanese script across 64 pages of grid-lined paper the size of a university notebook, was composed with remarkable precision. It was written on graph paper typically used for architectural design, evoking the geometric structure of blueprints. However, significant portions of the text are difficult to decipher due to heavy graffiti and markings left by a third party.

Yi Sang's works are complex and often use ambiguous expressions, sometimes employing words that do not conform to conventional grammar. Most of his early poems (including those published in "Joseon and Architecture" (朝鮮と建築), believed to be written until 1932) and parts of his Posthumous Note were written in Japanese. The translations may not fully capture the intended meaning of Yi Sang's original works. Yi Sang’s Japanese poems were first translated into Korean in 1956 by Yoo Jung and Im Jong-guk. In fact, their translations involved liberal interpretation and were not cross-checked, resulting in inconsistencies in how words were translated. Therefore, to analyze his works accurately, it is preferable to understand them through the original texts rather than translations.

Yi Sang’s works are closely connected to mathematics and science. He adopted numbers and mathematical symbols as poetic language, distinguishing his literary imagination through these elements. In his first published poem, “異常ナ可逆反應”, geometric concepts such as “a circle of arbitrary radius” and “a line connecting a point inside and a point outside the circle” appear. Furthermore, in “Three-Dimensional Angle Blueprint(三次角設計図)”, mathematical expressions like nPn and names of mathematicians such as Euclid are mentioned. Scientific knowledge from physics—such as spectrum, atom, and electron—also makes appearances in his work. Some argue that it is worth considering quantum mechanics when interpreting Yi's works, and there is a study that specifically relates his poem "Crow's Eye View Poem No. 1(烏瞰圖 詩題一號)" to quantum mechanics. His poetry also contains expressions that reflect concepts related to the theory of relativity. "Three-Dimensional Angle Blueprint(三次角設計図)", there is a line that poses the question, "If a person runs faster than light, can they see the light". Some interpret this as the writer's contemplation on the theory of relativity. Many of Yi Sang's works contain information related to physics. Quantum mechanics was first introduced to Joseon in 1936 in an article by Do Sang-rok, published in the monthly magazine "Jogwang"(1936. 03., 04., 월간지《조광》, 도상록). While quantum mechanics were not well-studied in Joseon, it is also possible that he learned about quantum mechanics from Japanese-language sources, given that he was fluent in Japanese and read many Japanese-language magazines. An article about Einstein's theory of relativity was also published in the first volume of Gongwoo, a magazine created by graduates of Gyeonseong Technical College.

Gwangju Institute of Science and Technology(GIST) has a 'Yi Sang's Literature and Science' course, which specializes in the analysis of Yi Sang's literary works from the perspective of science and various languages. Four papers on Yi Sang were published from the course.

== Published works ==
After his death, from 1937 to 1939, 16 of his posthumous works were released, including poems, essays, and novels. In 1956, nine more Japanese poems were found and their Korean translations were released. In the following years, more draft notes in Japanese, which are almost certainly thought to be Yi Sang's for several reasons, were found, and they were translated into Korean and introduced from 1960 to 1976.

Since 1960, a total of 26 works by Yi Sang have been discovered. Of these, 25 were published from Yi Sang's posthumous manuscripts acquired by critic Jo Yeon-hyeon. The 「Hwang (獚)」 series is composed of works written in Yi Sang's early notebooks, which remained unpublished until his death. After his passing, the manuscripts were discovered in the possession of Jo Yeon-hyeon. Regarding the discovery process, Jo Yeon-hyeon explained, "Some time ago, a student named Lee Yeon-bok from the night school at Hanyang University brought an old notebook to me. Although it was my first time meeting him, it was immediately evident that he was a literary enthusiast and particularly fond of Yi Sang. The notebook he presented was a draft book of Yi Sang's Japanese poems. Lee had found this notebook while visiting the house of his friend, Kim Jong-sun, who runs a furniture store. Kim's older brother had acquired the notebook, which had been used as waste paper, from an acquaintance who owned an antiquarian bookstore. About 90% of the roughly 100-page notebook was already damaged, with only about 10% remaining intact. Although Lee Yeon-bok was not proficient in Japanese, he was intrigued by the characters written in the notebook. He obtained the notebook and, after comparing it with various sources, including <李箱全集>, he surmised that it was an unpublished manuscript by Yi Sang and brought it to me."

=== Works in Korean ===
Poems
Year	Series	Title	Translated Title	Publisher
1933	-	꽃나무	A Flower Tree	가톨닉靑年
1933	-	이런시	This Kind of Poem	가톨닉靑年
1933	-	一九三三, 六, 一	1933, 6, 1	가톨닉靑年
1933	-	거울	Mirror	가톨닉靑年
1933	-	보통기념		월간매신
1934	Crow's Eye View (烏瞰圖)	詩題一號	Poem No. 1	朝鮮中央日報
1934	Crow's Eye View (烏瞰圖)	詩題二號	Poem No. 2	朝鮮中央日報
1934	Crow's Eye View (烏瞰圖)	詩題三號	Poem No. 3	朝鮮中央日報
1934	Crow's Eye View (烏瞰圖)	詩題四號	Poem No. 4	朝鮮中央日報
1934	Crow's Eye View (烏瞰圖)	詩題五號	Poem No. 5	朝鮮中央日報
1934	Crow's Eye View (烏瞰圖)	詩題六號	Poem No. 6	朝鮮中央日報
1934	Crow's Eye View (烏瞰圖)	詩題七號	Poem No. 7	朝鮮中央日報
1934	Crow's Eye View (烏瞰圖)	詩題八號 解剖	Poem No. 8 Dissection	朝鮮中央日報
1934	Crow's Eye View (烏瞰圖)	詩題九號 銃口	Poem No. 9 Muzzle	朝鮮中央日報
1934	Crow's Eye View (烏瞰圖)	詩題十號 나비	Poem No. 10 Butterfly	朝鮮中央日報
1934	Crow's Eye View (烏瞰圖)	詩題十一號	Poem No. 11	朝鮮中央日報
1934	Crow's Eye View (烏瞰圖)	詩題十二號	Poem No. 12	朝鮮中央日報
1934	Crow's Eye View (烏瞰圖)	詩題十三號	Poem No. 13	朝鮮中央日報
1934	Crow's Eye View (烏瞰圖)	詩題十四號	Poem No. 14	朝鮮中央日報
1934	Crow's Eye View (烏瞰圖)	詩題十五號	Poem No. 15	朝鮮中央日報
1934	-	素榮爲題		中央
1935	-	정식		가톨닉靑年
1935	-	紙碑		朝鮮中央日報
1936	-	紙碑-어디갔는지모르는안해		中央
1936	易斷	火爐	(charcoal) brazier	가톨닉靑年
1936	易斷	아츰	morning	가톨닉靑年
1936	易斷	家庭	family	가톨닉靑年
1936	易斷	易斷	reverse one's fate	가톨닉靑年
1936	易斷	行路	path in life	가톨닉靑年
1936	-	街外街傳		詩와小說
1936	-	明鏡		女聲
1936	危篤	禁制	prohibition	Chosun Ilbo
1936	危篤	追求	pursuit	Chosun Ilbo
1936	危篤	沈歿	sinking	Chosun Ilbo
1936	危篤	絶壁	cliff	Chosun Ilbo
1936	危篤	白晝	broad daylight	Chosun Ilbo
1936	危篤	門閥	family faction	Chosun Ilbo
1936	危篤	位置	location	Chosun Ilbo
1936	危篤	買春		Chosun Ilbo
1936	危篤	生涯	life	Chosun Ilbo
1936	危篤	內部	internal	Chosun Ilbo
1936	危篤	肉親	blood relative	Chosun Ilbo
1936	危篤	自傷	self-injury	Chosun Ilbo
1936	-	I WED A TOY BRIDE		三四文學
1937	-	破帖	Torn Notebook	子午線 October
1938	-	(無題)	(Untitled)	貘(第3號) October
1938	-	(無題) (기이) (Note: Publications are arbitrarily entitled 「理由以前」)	(Untitled)	貘(第4號) October

Long novels
Year	Title	Translated Title	Year	Publisher
1930	十二月 十二日	December 12	1930	朝鮮

Short novels
Year	Title (English Title)	Translated Title	Publisher	Remarks
1932	地圖의 暗室	Darkroom of a Map	朝鮮 March	With pen name '比久'
1932	休業과 事情	Shutdown & Reasons	朝鮮 April	
1934	지팽이 轢死		月刊每申 March	
1936	鼅鼄會豕	Ji-Ju-Whoe-Shi	中央 June	The title means "two spiders that met a pig"
1936	날개	The Wings	朝光 September	
1936	逢別記	Bongbyeolgi	女性 December	The Title means "a writing of meet and separate"
1937	童骸	Child's Remains	朝光 February	
1937	황소와 도깨비	The Bull and the Goblin	每日申報 March 5–9	Fable / Fairy tale
1937	終生記		朝光 May	
1938	幻視記	Record of Illusions	靑色紙 June	
1939	失花	Flower Loss	文章 March	
1939	斷髮	Hair Cut	朝鮮 April	
1939	金裕貞	Kim Yu Jeong	靑色紙 May	

Essays
Year	Title	Translated Title	Publisher	Remarks
1934	血書三態		新女性 June	
1934	산책의 가을	The autumn of a walk	新東亞 October	
1935	현대미술의 요람	The cradle of modern art	每日新報 March 14 ~ March 23	
1935	山村餘情		每日新報 September 27 ~ October 11	
1936	문학을 버리고 문화를 상상할 수 없다	I can't imagine culture without literature	朝鮮中央日報 January 6	
1936	나의 애송시	My favorite poem	中央 January	
1936	논단시감		朝鮮日報 January 24 ~ January 28	
1936	西望栗島		朝光 March	
1936	早春點描		每日新報 March 3 ~ March 26	
1936	편집후기		詩와 小說(Poetry and Novel) March	
1936	女像四題		女性 April	
1936	내가 좋아하는 화초와 내 집의 화초		朝光 May	
1936	약수		中央 July	
1936	EPIGRAM		女性 August	
1936	아름다운 조선말	The Beautiful Korean Language	中央 September	
1936	행복	Happiness	女性 October	
1936	가을의 探勝處		朝光 October	
1936	秋橙雜筆		每日新報 October 14 ~ October 28	
1937	십구세기식		三四文學 April	
1937	공포의 기록	Records of Horror	每日新報 April 25 ~ May 15	
1937	권태	Monotony	朝鮮日報 May 4 ~ May 11	
1937	슬픈이야기	A Sad Story	文章 June	
1937	오감도 작자의 말	Remarks from the author of "Crow's Eye View"	文章 June	According to Park Tae-won(박태원)'s eulogy [Yi Sang's flagella(이상의 片貌], "It was written because 30 series of「烏瞰圖」 were discontinued into 15 series. It was not announced at the time."
1938	문학과 정치	Literature and Politics	四海公論 July	
1939	실락원	Paradise Lost	朝光 February	
1939	병상 이후		靑色紙 May	
1939	東京		文章 May	
1939	最低樂園		朝鮮文學 May	

Letters, magazines, etc.
Year	Title	Translated Title	Publisher	Remarks
1936	동생 옥희 보아라	Read this letter sister Ohk-he	中央 September	Letter to send his sister Kim Ohk-he(金玉姬)
1936	김기림에게 2	To Kim Ki-rim (2)		Letter to send Kim Ki-rim
1936	김기림에게 3	To Kim Ki-rim (3)		Letter to send Kim Ki-rim
1936	김기림에게 4	To Kim Ki-rim (4)		Letter to send Kim Ki-rim
1936	김기림에게 5	To Kim Ki-rim (5)		Letter to send Kim Ki-rim
1936	김기림에게 6	To Kim Ki-rim (6)		Letter to send Kim Ki-rim
1936	김기림에게 7	To Kim Ki-rim (7)		Letter to send Kim Ki-rim
1936	김기림에게 8	To Kim Ki-rim (8)		Letter to send Kim Ki-rim
1936	안필승(안회남)에게			Letter to send Ahn Hoenam (安懷南)
1936	남동생 김운경에게	To my brother Kim Un-Gyeong		Letter to send his brother Kim Un-gyeong(金雲卿)
1936	아포리즘	Aphorism	詩와 小說(Poetry and Novel) March	
1939	아포리즘	Aphorism	文章 July	
-	아포리즘	Aphorism	京城高等工業 - 專門學校 Photo album	

=== Works in Japanese ===
Poems
Year	Series	Title	Translated Title	Publisher
1931	異常ナ可逆反應 (A Strange Reversible Reaction)	異常ナ可逆反應	A Strange Reversible Reaction	朝鮮と建築 July
1931	異常ナ可逆反應 (A Strange Reversible Reaction)	破片ノ景色ㅡ	The Scenery of Broken Parts (Note: Both "The Scenery of Broken Parts" and "The Amusement of ▽" have the same subtitles, "△ is my AMOUREUSE". Similarly, "A Nervously Obese Triangle" has a subtitle "▽ is my AMOUREUSE".)	朝鮮と建築 July
1931	異常ナ可逆反應 (A Strange Reversible Reaction)	▽ノ遊戯ㅡ	The Amusement of ▽	朝鮮と建築 July
1931	異常ナ可逆反應 (A Strange Reversible Reaction)	ひげㅡ	The Beard	朝鮮と建築 July
1931	異常ナ可逆反應 (A Strange Reversible Reaction)	BOITEUXㆍBOITEUSE		朝鮮と建築 July
1931	異常ナ可逆反應 (A Strange Reversible Reaction)	空腹ㅡ (Note: The dash line of "空腹ㅡ" is longer than others in "A Strange Reversible Reaction")	The Empty Stomach	朝鮮と建築 July
1931	鳥瞰圖 (Bird's-Eye View)	二人····1····	Two People ····1····	朝鮮と建築 August
1931	鳥瞰圖 (Bird's-Eye View)	二人····2····	Two People ····2····	朝鮮と建築 August
1931	鳥瞰圖 (Bird's-Eye View)	神経質に肥満した三角形	A Nervously Obese Triangle	朝鮮と建築 August
1931	鳥瞰圖 (Bird's-Eye View)	LE URINE		朝鮮と建築 August
1931	鳥瞰圖 (Bird's-Eye View)	顔		朝鮮と建築 August
1931	鳥瞰圖 (Bird's-Eye View)	運動	Movement	朝鮮と建築 August
1931	鳥瞰圖 (Bird's-Eye View)	狂女の告白	Confession of A Crazy Woman	朝鮮と建築 August
1931	鳥瞰圖 (Bird's-Eye View)	興行物天使		朝鮮と建築 August
1931	三次角設計図 (Three-Dimensional Angle Blueprint)	線に関する覚書1	Memorandum on the Line 1	朝鮮と建築 October
1931	三次角設計図 (Three-Dimensional Angle Blueprint)	線に関する覚書2	Memorandum on the Line 2	朝鮮と建築 October
1931	三次角設計図 (Three-Dimensional Angle Blueprint)	線に関する覚書3	Memorandum on the Line 3	朝鮮と建築 October
1931	三次角設計図 (Three-Dimensional Angle Blueprint)	線に関する覚書4 (未定稿)	Memorandum on the Line 4 (Unfinished draft)	朝鮮と建築 October
1931	三次角設計図 (Three-Dimensional Angle Blueprint)	線に関する覚書5	Memorandum on the Line 5	朝鮮と建築 October
1931	三次角設計図 (Three-Dimensional Angle Blueprint)	線に関する覚書6	Memorandum on the Line 6	朝鮮と建築 October
1931	三次角設計図 (Three-Dimensional Angle Blueprint)	線に関する覚書7	Memorandum on the Line 7	朝鮮と建築 October
1932	建築無限六面角体 (Building Infinite-Hexahedral-Angle Bodies)	AU MAGASIN DE NOUVEAUTES	AT THE WAREHOUSE OF NEW THINGS	朝鮮と建築 July
1932	建築無限六面角体 (Building Infinite-Hexahedral-Angle Bodies)	熱河略圖 No. 2 (未定稿)	Rough Map Under Heat No. 2 (Unfinalized draft)	朝鮮と建築 July
1932	建築無限六面角体 (Building Infinite-Hexahedral-Angle Bodies)	診断 0：1	Diagnosis 0:1	朝鮮と建築 July
1932	建築無限六面角体 (Building Infinite-Hexahedral-Angle Bodies)	二十二年	Twenty-Two Years	朝鮮と建築 July
1932	建築無限六面角体 (Building Infinite-Hexahedral-Angle Bodies)	出版法	The publication law (Note: The publication law has two meanings: "how to publish books, etc." and "the Pre-Censorship of All Documents and Books for Release and Distribution Act (1909).)	朝鮮と建築 July
1932	建築無限六面角体 (Building Infinite-Hexahedral-Angle Bodies)	且8氏の出発	The Departure of Mr. 8	朝鮮と建築 July
1932	建築無限六面角体 (Building Infinite-Hexahedral-Angle Bodies)	真昼——或るESQUISSE——	Noon——A Certain ESQUISSE——	朝鮮と建築 July
1940	-	蜻蛉	Dragonfly	乳色の雲
1940	-	一つの夜	A Night	乳色の雲
1956	-	隻脚	One Leg	李箱全集
1956	-	距離(女去りし場合)	Distance (in case of leaving a woman)	李箱全集
1956	-	囚人の作った箱庭	A Prisoner's Garden	李箱全集
1956	-	肉親の章	Family Chapter	李箱全集
1956	-	内科	Internal Medicine	李箱全集
1956	-	骨片ニ関スル無題	No Title Related to Bone Fragments	李箱全集
1956	-	街衢ノ寒サ	Street's Cold	李箱全集
1956	-	朝	Morning	李箱全集
1956	-	最後	Last	李箱全集
1960	-	(無題)	(Untitled) (Note: Three untitled works were published. Upon publication, each was given a title: The Hexogonal Mirror Room, The Woman Like a Finger, and The Esprit of a Dead Dog.)	現代文學 November
1960	-	一九三一年 作品 第一番	Year 1931 Work No. 1	現代文學 November
1961		구두	Shoes	新東亞 January
1961		어리석은 석반		現代文學 January
1966		(無題)	(Untitled)	現代文學 July
1966		애야		現代文學 July
1976		회한의 장		文學思想 June
1976		단장		文學思想 July
1976		與田準一	Jun'ichi Yoda	文學思想 July
1976		月原橙一郞		文學思想 July

Essays
Year	Title	Translated Title	Publisher
1935	船の歴史	The history of ships	新兒童 October
1960	얼마 안되는 변해		現代文學 November
1960	(無題)	(No title)	
1960	(無題)	(No title)	
1960	이 아해들에게 장난감을 주라		現代文學 December
1960	모색		現代文學 December
1960	(無題)	(No title)	現代文學 December
1961	습작 쇼오윈도우 수점		現代文學 February
1976	첫번째 방랑		文學思想 July
1976	불행한 계승		文學思想 July
1976	객혈의 아침		文學思想 July
1976	獚의 記 作品 第二番		文學思想 July
1976	作品 第三番	Work No. 3	文學思想 July
1986	공포의 기록(서장)		文學思想 October
1986	공포의 성채		文學思想 October
1986	야색		文學思想 October
1986	단상		文學思想 October
2000	낙랑 파라의 새로움	The Newness of Nakrang Para	韓國文學硏究

Letter, Magazine, etc.
Year	Title	Translated Title	Publisher	Remarks
1932	巻頭言1		朝鮮と建築 June	Presumed to be Yi Sang's work while participating in the magazine's editing
1932	巻頭言2		朝鮮と建築 July	Presumed to be Yi Sang's work while participating in the magazine's editing
1932	巻頭言3		朝鮮と建築 August	Presumed to be Yi Sang's work while participating in the magazine's editing
1932	巻頭言4		朝鮮と建築 September	Presumed to be Yi Sang's work while participating in the magazine's editing
1932	巻頭言5		朝鮮と建築 October	Presumed to be Yi Sang's work while participating in the magazine's editing
1932	巻頭言6		朝鮮と建築 November	Presumed to be Yi Sang's work while participating in the magazine's editing
1932	巻頭言7		朝鮮と建築 December	Presumed to be Yi Sang's work while participating in the magazine's editing
1933	巻頭言8		朝鮮と建築 May	Presumed to be Yi Sang's work while participating in the magazine's editing
1933	巻頭言9		朝鮮と建築 June	Presumed to be Yi Sang's work while participating in the magazine's editing
1933	巻頭言10		朝鮮と建築 July	Presumed to be Yi Sang's work while participating in the magazine's editing
1933	巻頭言11		朝鮮と建築 August	Presumed to be Yi Sang's work while participating in the magazine's editing
1933	巻頭言12		朝鮮と建築 October	Presumed to be Yi Sang's work while participating in the magazine's editing
1933	巻頭言13		朝鮮と建築 November	Presumed to be Yi Sang's work while participating in the magazine's editing
1933	巻頭言14		朝鮮と建築 December	Presumed to be Yi Sang's work while participating in the magazine's editing
1978	낙서	Scribble	李箱詩全作集 Art book	It is in the pictorial of the 全集(2). It reads, "Yi Sang's scribbles on the wall of Nakrang(낙랑). He soothes his anger here by drinking a drink." 'Nakrang(낙랑)' means a cafe called 'Nakrang Para(낙랑파라).' It also appears in the essay "The Newness of Nakrang Para(낙랑파라의 새로움)."
1976	낙서	Scribble	讀書生活 November	It is carried with Yi Sang's self-portrait on the inner cover of Jules Renard's 「The Power Notebook」. It was introduced by Im Jong-guk(임종국).

=== Works translated into English ===
- Yi Sang: Selected Works (translated by Don Mee Choi, Jack Jung, Joyelle McSweeney, and Sawako Nakayasu), Seattle and New York: Wave Books, 2020. ISBN 9781950268085.
- The Wings, Seoul: Jimoondang Publishing, 2001. ISBN 89-88095-50-2.
- Three Poets of Modern Korea: Yi Sang, Hahm Dong-seon, and Choi Young-mi, Louisville: Sarabande Books, 2002. ISBN 1-889330-71-X
- Yi Sang, "Wings," translated by Walter K. Lew, in Modern Korean Fiction: An Anthology, eds. Bruce Fulton and Youngmin Kwon. NY: Columbia University Press, 2005. ISBN 0-231-13513-0
- Yi Sang, 20 poems, translated from the Korean by Walter K. Lew, from the Japanese by Edward Mark, in The Columbia Anthology of Modern Korean Poetry, ed. David R. McCann. NY: Columbia University Press, 2004. ISBN 0-231-11129-0
- Meetings and farewells : Modern Korean stories, Chong-wha Chung St Lucia QLD: University of Queensland Press, 1980. ISBN 0702215538
- The Wings : eBook I-AHN CREATIVE, 2015. ISBN 89-98659-02-6.

== In popular culture ==
Yi Sang inspired numerous contemporary cultural works including video games, musicals, music and movies.

=== Films and TV shows ===
- The Mystery of the Cube (건축무한육면각체의 비밀, 1999). Directed by Yoo Sang-wook.
- The Wings of Lee Sang (이상의 날개, 1968). A 59-minute romance short film produced by the Korea Art Film Company. The film was directed by Choi In-hyeon and features actors Shin Sung-il, Nam Jeong-im, Moon hee and Choi Bul-am.
- My dear KeumHong (금홍아 금홍아, 1995). A 96-minute feature film produced by Taeheung Film Company. Directed by Kim Yoo-jin, the film stars Kim Kap-soo, Kim Soo-chul, Lee Ji-eun, and Yoon Jeong-bin.
- Yi Sang and more (이상 그 이상; 李箱 그 以上, 2013). <Yi Sang and more> is the eighth installment of the 70-minute MBC drama festival season 1, which aired on MBC from Nov. 28, 2013. The director is Choi Jung-kyu, actor Cho Seung-woo plays Yi Sang, and other actors such as Park Ha-sun, Jung Kyung-ho, and Han Sang-jin appear.

=== Musicals ===
- Smoke(스모크, 2017). Produced by Double K Entertainment, draws inspiration from Yi Sang's "Crow's Eye View." It explores the lives of three characters who represent different facets of Yi Sang's persona. The musical's narrative and lyrics include direct references to Yi Sang's literary works, and it delves into the psychological and existential struggles depicted in his writings.
- Fan Letter(팬레터, 2016). First released in 2016, <Fan Letter> is a 160-minute musical produced by Live. The song was written by Han Jae-eun and composed by Park Hyun-sook. Based on the 1930s-era anecdotes of "Yi Sang," "Kim Yoo-jung(김유정)," and the "Guinhoe(구인회, 九人會)".
- L'art reste(라흐헤스트, 2022). First released on September 6, 2022, <L'art reste> is a 110-minute musical produced by the Hong Company. The musical was directed by Kim Eun-young. The lyrics were written by Kim Han-sol, and Moon Hye-sung and Jung Hye-ji composed the song. "L'art reste" means "art remains" in French. It is based on a true story about a Western painter, Byeon Dong-rim, her first husband Yi Sang, and her second husband, Kim Hwan-ki.
- Kkood bye, Yi Sang (꾿빠이, 이상, 2017). Organized by the Seoul Arts Center, <Kkood bye, Yi Sang> is based on the 2016 original novel of the same name.

=== Other ===
- The character Yi Sang, who is based on Kim Haegyŏng, appears in Project Moon's role-playing game Limbus Company. In the game, Yi Sang is portrayed as a talented scientist, mirroring the author's real-life career as an architectural engineer during the colonial period. The character's dialogues often reference Yi Sang's poems, such as "The Wings" and "Mirror," reflecting the profound themes of time and existence found in his works.
- Shin Hae Gyeong, a contemporary musician, frequently draws on Yi Sang's literary themes in his music. His stage name and several album titles are direct references to Yi Sang's works. For instance, his name is taken from Yi Sang's real name, Kim Hae-kyung. His album My Reversible Reaction is inspired by Yi Sang's poem "A Strange Reversible Reaction." At the end of the music video "And then", a phrase from Yi Sang's novel Bonbyeolgi, "속아도 꿈결, 속여도 꿈결" appears directly. His music often captures the melancholic and introspective tone of Yi Sang's poetry, creating a modern dialogue with the poet's legacy.
