= Choi Jae-seo =

Korean literary critic (1908–1964)

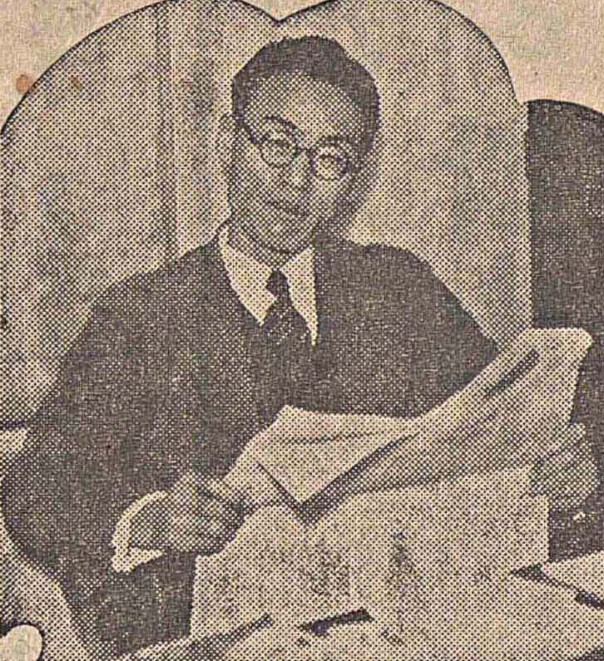
- Choi in 1939
- Born: 11 February 1908
- Died: 16 November 1964 (aged 56)
- Occupation: Literary scholar and critic
- Education: Keijō Imperial University
- Genre: Literary criticism Translation; English literature
- Notable works: Literature and Intellect; Joseon Literature of the Transition Period; Shakespeare's Art as Order of Life

Choi Jae-seo (Korean: 최재서; Hanja: 崔載瑞; 11 February 1908 – 16 November 1964) was a South Korean literary scholar, a critic of English literature, and a novelist. He graduated from Keijō Imperial University (currently Seoul National University), received his M.A. from this University, and later taught at Yonsei University. As editor-in-chief of the literary magazine Humanities Review, he was a forerunner of progressive literary criticism. Although he later presided over pro-Japanese literary journals under pressure from the ruling Japanese, he undoubtedly remains an important figure in Korean modernism of the 1930s.

== Early life and education ==
Choi was born on February 11, 1908, in Haeju, Hwanghae Province, Korea to wealthy parents, the only son in a family of four daughters. His father, Choi Kyung-tae, ran an orchard called Taeilwon, and became one of the richest men in the area. From an early age, Choi Jae-seo was an intellectual prodigy who showed great promise. He finished elementary school in Haeju and attended Gyeongseong Secondary High School. After graduating, he entered the department of arts at Keijo Imperial University in April 1926 where he studied English Literature. After completing his degree in 1931, he entered graduate school at the same university and studied under prominent professors including Kiyoshi Sato and Reginald Horace Blyth. His master's thesis was titled "The Development of Shelley's Poetic Mind."

== Career ==
He was hired as a lecturer in law and literature at Keijō Imperial University upon Sato's recommendation, becoming the first Korean and first graduate of Keijō Imperial University to teach at his alma mater. However, as a result of fierce opposition to hiring a Korean lecturer from other Japanese professors, he was subsequently dismissed from his post and went on to teach at Keijō Professional Law School and later Bosung Professional College (now Korea University).

Around this time, Choi started to focus on literary works, publishing his first book Literature and Intellect in June 1938. In 1939, he founded the literary journal Humanities Review where he served as editor-in-chief until April 1942. He began his pro-Japanese writing in earnest in Humanities Review. In "War Literature" (June 1940 issue of Humanities Review), he defended the Sino-Japanese War, emphasizing the justification for war and arguing that people should have a "humble attitude" in accepting the "severe (war) experience" that "raises humanity to the highest level". Choi participated in a pro-Japanese organization founded in 1939 for the purpose of state-run cooperation and served as a major executive in establishing a total mobilization system for Japanese wartime. In February 1939, he proposed the Hwanggun Consolation Writers' Group with Lim Hwa and Lee Tae-joon, and on March 14, he served as an executive committee member on the election day of the consolation ambassador for the Hwanggun Consolation.

In November 1941, the Japanese colonial government merged all literary journals in the name of an all-out war and published the pro-Japanese idiomatic magazine, National Literature, for which Choi served as editor and publisher until May 1945. National Literature was an organization that forcibly integrated and used Korean literary circles to generate national literature based on the spirit of imperialism. In June 1945, just before liberation, Choi joined the Joseon Press Council and was appointed as a managing director. In July, he was appointed as a researcher at the Joseon branch of the Heung-A Association of Japan as well as a promoter and station member of the National Association of Korean Literacy. After liberation, he participated in the National Cultural Festival held at the Construction Hall on December 27 and 28, 1948. He was arrested and imprisoned under the Anti-National Punishment Act in September 1949, but his sentence was suspended due to the expiration of the statute of limitations.

On June 25, 1950, the Korean War broke out and the Korean People's Army of North Korea occupied Seoul; Choi fled to Daegu on December 25 and remained mostly out of the literary world for several years. Around 1953, he broke his long silence and renewed his academic activities, writing articles for the journal Sasanggae. He was mainly active in Sasanggae in the 1950s and began publishing work in Modern Literature in the 1960s. Choi taught in the English Department of Yonsei University but resigned after the students protested in the spring of 1960. He was later appointed dean of Dongguk University Graduate School but resigned after a year. In 1961, he was awarded Korea's first doctorate in English literature from the same university. An elaboration on his doctoral thesis, Shakespeare's Art as Order of Life was published in the United States in the summer of 1963. In April 1963, he was appointed as a professor at Hanyang University, a position he held until his death. He died on November 16, 1964, at Seoul's National Medical Center.

== Literary career ==
Choi Jae-seo's literary debut was a paper titled "Inexperienced Literature", which introduced the English literary scholar A. C. Bradley and his literary theories and was published in the literary journal, Shinheung. He also translated a variety of famous literary papers. With the publication of the papers "Construction of Literary Theory of Modern Intellectualism" and "Critique and Science: Literary Theory of Modern Intellectualism", he started to develop his literary theory of intellectualism.

However, due to the pressure of the Japanese colonial system, Choi's literary critiques shifted toward the literary theory of the Japanese "new order movement", and he founded the literary magazine, National Literature, in 1941 with the aim of forcibly integrating Korean writers and literary circles into Japanese schools of thought. Because of his pro-Japanese activities, he stepped away from literary academia after liberation and went to teach English literature at universities. He also translated many famous works at this time, including Nathaniel Hawthorne's The Scarlet Letter and Shakespeare's Hamlet, two translations that are still considered the best Korean translations of the works.

Choi was a leading literary critic of Korean literature in the 1930s. To overcome the old customs of proletarian literature, he introduced various scholarly theories, including those of Stephen Spender, Herbert Read, Irving Babbitt, T. S. Eliot, and Aldous Huxley, thereby diversifying Korean literature of the 1930s. Before Choi, the Korean literary circle was divided into two groups: the Korean Artists' Proletarian Federation (KAPF), which focused tendency writing and politically inclined works that served to persuade readers to accept left-wing political and ideological tendencies; and a group of poets continuing the tradition of the national literature movement through creative writing. These two literary movements opposed one another, but the KAPF was eventually disbanded by governmental authorities. In response, Choi wrote the paper "Theory of Satire" in which he lamented that "Korean literature is now at a dead end" and pointed out the limitations of both tendency writing's social criticism and national literature's aesthetic criticism, ultimately merging the two to form his literary theory of intellectualism. Choi was also the first scholar to establish academic criticism in Korea.

Rather than denying the fundamental ideology of proletarian literature, Choi endeavoured to understand it in a wholesome way and even shared special friendships with proletarian literature critics like Kim Nam-cheon, Lim Hwa, and Lee Won-jo. However, he criticized the lack of composition in Romanticism and proletarian literature. According to Choi, literary composition involves the "complete agreement between ideology and reality, thoughts and actions". He argued that only when these factors are completely amalgamated into one can a piece of literary work be "wholesome literature" constructed within a wholesome composition.

As for literary criticism, Choi contended the critic's role is to serve as "the intermediary between the writer and the reader". He therefore argued that the critic's mission is not only to convey the people's complaints and hopes to authors, but also to help the people understand and appreciate the authors' work.

== Works ==
=== Literature and intellect ===
Choi published Literature and Intellect, a book of literary criticism, in 1938. It comprises 19 articles, including works like the "Literary Theory of Modern Intellectualism" and "Criticism and Science", and 20 short reviews such as "The Negotiability and Honesty of Language" and "Tradition and Dogma". In the book, Choi introduces the basic foundations of Western literary theories, focusing on modern intellectualism as well as the literary theories of realism and moral criticism.

In "Literary Theory of Modern Intellectualism" and "Criticism and Science", Choi introduces modern British literary theories that later became the ideological basis for the central contentions of his theory of intellectualism. The articles explain, in order, T. E. Hulme's theory of discontinuity and geometric art, T. S. Eliot's impersonal theory of poetry and traditional literary criticism, Herbert Read’s psychoanalytic literary criticism, and I. A. Richards' psychological theory of value.

Choi then goes on to criticize Korea’s realism literature as a "crippled literature" that depicts only the poor realities of farmers in rural areas, arguing that the true spirit of realism is to observe and accurately describe objects with avant-garde substantiality. In "The Writer and Morality", Choi outlines his theory of moral criticism, arguing that if realism fails to observe and describe society in a consistent way and cannot provide insight into human relationships, it contradicts the frame of morality.

== Major publications ==
=== Authored books ===
- Literature and Intellect (1938)
- Collection of International Lyric Poems (1938)
- Joseon Literature Almanac (1939)
- Joseon Written Works Almanac (1940)
- Joseon Literature During the Transition Period (1943)
- An Anthology of Sin-bando I & II (1944)
- MacArthur Sensation (1951)
- Principle of Literature (1957)
- Modern English and American Short Stories (1959)
- History of English Literature (1959–1960)
- Standard English Grammar (1960)
- Choi Jae-seo's Literary Theories (1961)
- The Golden Treasury (published in English; 1962)
- Literary Art Theory (1963)
- Shakespeare's Art Theory (1963)
- Shakespeare's Art as Order of Life (Published in English; 1965)
- Impressions and Contemplations (1977)

=== Translations ===
- Rousseau and Romanticism by Irving Babbitt (1939–1940)
- MacArthur: Man of Action by Kelly Frank and Cornelius Ryan (1952)
- The Scarlet Letter by Nathaniel Hawthorne (1953)
- Hamlet by William Shakespeare (1954)
- An American Tragedy by Theodore Dreiser (1959)
- The Short Stories of Edgar Allan Poe (1961)
