= Don Mee Choi =

Korean-American poet and translator (born 1962)

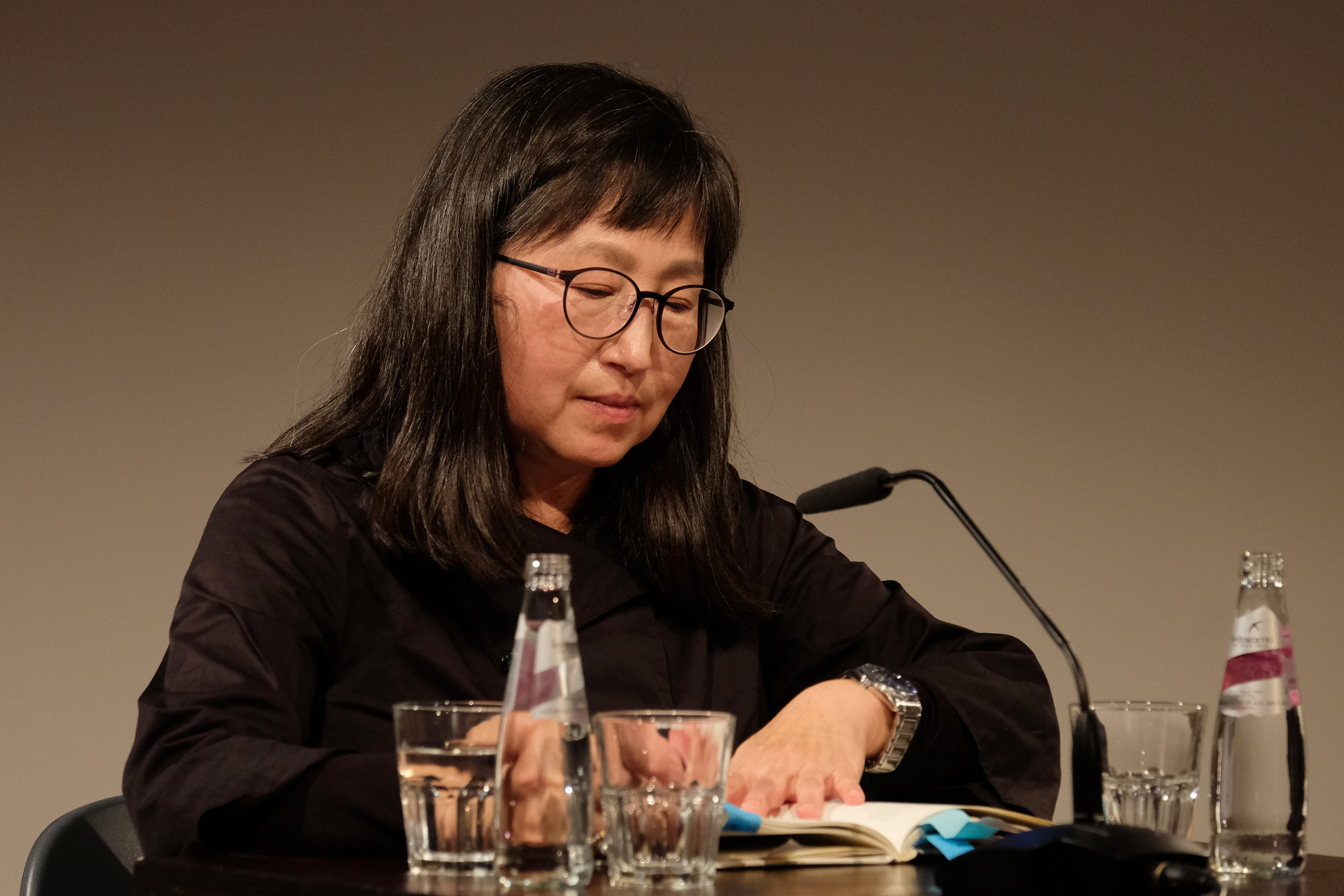
- Born: 1962 (age 63–64); Seoul, South Korea
- Education: California Institute of the Arts BFA '84; MFA '86
- Writing career
- Genre: Poetry
- Notable work: DMZ Colony
- Notable awards: Whiting Award, MacArthur Fellow, Guggenheim Fellowship, National Book Award for Poetry

Korean name
- Hangul: 최돈미
- Hanja: 崔燉美
- RR: Choe Donmi
- MR: Ch'oe Tonmi

Don Mee Choi (Korean: 최돈미; born 1962) is a Korean-American poet and translator.

== Life ==
Don Mee Choi was born in Seoul, South Korea, educated in the United States, and now lives in Berlin, Germany. Choi's works of documentary poetry draw on family history as well as archival material to interrogate "the overlapping histories of Korea and the U.S." In addition to her own poetry, she is a prolific translator of modern Korean women poets, including several books by Kim Hyesoon.

== Awards ==
- 2011: Whiting Award
- 2012: Lucien Stryk Asian Translation Prize for All the Garbage of the World, Unite! by Kim Hyesoon
- 2016: Lannan Literary Fellowship Award
- 2019: Griffin Poetry Prize Award for translation of Autobiography of Death from the Korean written by Kim Hyesoon
- 2020: National Book Award for Poetry for DMZ Colony
- 2021: Guggenheim Fellowship Poetry
- 2021: MacArthur Fellows Program
- 2021: Royal Society of Literature International Writer
- 2025: shortlisted for the PEN Heaney Prize for Mirror Nation

== Works ==
=== Books ===
- The Morning News is Exciting, Action Books, 2010, ISBN 9780979975561
- Petite Manifesto, Vagabond Press, 2014 (chapbook)
- Freely Frayed,ᄏ=q, & Race=Nation, Wave Books, 2014 (chapbook)
- Sky Translation, Goodmorning Menagerie A Chapbook Press, n.d. (chapbook)
- Hardly War, Wave Books, 2016
- DMZ Colony, Wave Books, 2020
- Mirror Nation, Wave Books, (Publication date 4/2/24)

=== Translations ===
- Mommy Must Be a Fountain of Feathers by Kim Hyesoon, Action Books, 2005
- Anxiety of Words: Contemporary Poetry by Korean Women, Zephyr Press, 2006
- All the Garbage of the World, Unite! by Kim Hyesoon, Action Books, 2011
- Sorrowtoothpaste Mirrorcream by Kim Hyesoon, Action Books, 2014
- I'm OK, I'm Pig! by Kim Hyesoon, Bloodaxe Books, 2014
- Autobiography of Death by Kim Hyesoon, Bloodaxe Books, 2018 (winner of the 2019 Griffin Poetry Prize)
- Ahn Hak-sŏp #4 by Ahn Hak-sŏp and Don Mee Choi, The Green Violin, 2018 (chapbook)
- Yi Sang: Selected Works by Yi Sang, ed. Don Mee Choi, Wave Books, 2020

=== Anthology ===
- Yasuhiro Yotsumoto Ming Di Don Mee Choi, Shuntaro Tanikawa, Hyesoon Kim, Trilingual Renshi, Vagabond Press, 2015, ISBN 9781922181442
