= National Translation Award =

American translation award

- Awarded for: Outstanding contributions to literature in English by a literary translator
- Presented by: American Literary Translators Association (ALTA)
- Reward: US$4,000 (as of 2025)
- Status: Active
- Established: 1998
- First award: 1999
- Website: literarytranslators.org/awards/nta
- Related: Lucien Stryk Asian Translation Prize; Italian Prose in Translation Award; Spain-USA Foundation Translation Award; ALTA First Translation Prize }ALTA Travel Fellowships

The National Translation Award is awarded annually by the American Literary Translators Association for literary translators who have made an outstanding contribution to literature in English by masterfully recreating the artistic force of a book of consummate quality. Since 2015 the prize has been awarded separately in categories of prose and poetry. Established in 1998, the NTA is the only prize for a work of literary translation into English to include a full evaluation of the source language text. As of 2025, the award is worth $4,000 given to the translator. The award is usually given to translations of previously untranslated contemporary works or first-time translations of older works, but important re-translations have also been honored. The winning translators and books are featured at the annual conference of the American Literary Translators Association.

The ALTA also awards the Lucien Stryk Asian Translation Prize, Italian Prose in Translation Award, the Spain-USA Foundation Translation Award, the ALTA First Translation Prize, and the ALTA Travel Fellowships.

== Winners ==
=== National Translation Award 2007-2014 ===
| Year | Genre | Translator | Work | Language |
|---|---|---|---|---|
| 2007 | Prose | Joel Agee | The Selected Writings of Friedrich Dürrenmatt by Friedrich Dürrenmatt (University of Chicago) | German |
| 2008 | Drama | Richard Wilbur | The Theatre of Illusion by Pierre Corneille (Harvest Books) | French |
| 2009 | Poetry | Norman R. Shapiro | French Women Poets of Nine Centuries: The Distaff and the Pen by Multiple (Johns Hopkins University Press) | French |
| 2010 | Prose | Alex Zucker | All This Belongs to Me by Petra Hůlová (Northwestern University Press) | Czech |
| 2011 | Poetry | Lisa Rose Bradford | Between Words: Juan Gelman's Public Letter by Juan Gelman (Coimbra Editions) | Spanish |
| 2012 | Poetry | Sinan Antoon | In the Presence of Absence by Mahmoud Darwish (Archipelago) | Arabic |
| 2013 | Prose | Philip Boehm | The Hunger Angel by Herta Müller (Picador) | German |
| 2014 | Poetry | Eugene Ostashevsky & Matvei Yankelevich | An Invitation for Me to Think by Alexander Vvedensky (NYRB Poets) | Russian |

=== National Translation Award 2015-Current ===
2015 marked the first year in which two separate National Translation Awards were given, one for poetry and one for prose.

| Year | Genre | Translator | Work | Language | Judges |
|---|---|---|---|---|---|
| 2015 | Poetry | Pierre Joris | Breathturn into Timestead by Paul Celan (FSG) | French | Lisa Rose Bradford, Stephen Kessler, Diana Thow |
| 2015 | Prose | William Hutchins | New Waw, Saharan Oasis by Ibrahim al-Koni (University of Texas) | Arabic | Pamela Carmell, Jason Grunebaum, Anne Magnan-Park |
| 2016 | Poetry | Hilary Kaplan | Rilke Shake by Angélica Freitas (Phoneme Media) | Portuguese | Adriana Jacobs, Karen Kovacik, Cole Swensen |
| 2016 | Prose | Elizabeth Harris | Tristano Dies: A Life by Antonio Tabucchi (Archipelago) | Italian | Karen Emmerich, Andrea Labinger, Marian Schwartz |
| 2017 | Poetry | Daniel Borzutzky | Valdivia by Galo Ghigliotto (co.im.press) | Spanish | Ani Gjika, Katrine Øgaard Jensen, Gregory Racz |
| 2017 | Prose | Esther Allen | Zama by Antonio di Benedetto (NYRB Classics) | Spanish | Carol Apollonio, Ottilie Mulzet, Eric M. B. Becker |
| 2018 | Poetry | Katrine Øgaard Jensen | Third-Millennium Heart by Ursula Andkjær Olsen (Action Books) | Danish | Kareem James Abu-Zeid, Jennifer Feeley, Sawako Nakayasu |
| 2018 | Prose | Charlotte Mandell | Compass by Mathias Énard (New Directions) | French | Esther Allen, Tess Lewis, Jeremy Tiang |
| 2019 | Poetry | Bill Johnston | Pan Tadeusz: The Last Foray in Lithuania by Adam Mickiewicz (Archipelago) | Polish | Anna Deeny Morales, Cole Heinowitz, Sholeh Wolpe |
| 2019 | Prose | Karen Emmerich | What’s Left of the Night by Ersi Sotiropoulos (New Vessel Press) | Greek | Bonnie Huie, Charlotte Mandell, Jeffrey Zuckerman |
| 2020 | Prose | Jordan Stump | The Cheffe: A Cook's Novel by Marie NDiaye (A.A. Knopf) | French | Amaia Gabantxo, Emmanuel D. Harris II, and William Maynard Hutchins |
| 2020 | Poetry | Jake Levine, Soeun Seo, and Hedgie Choi | Hysteria by Kim Yi-deum | Korean | Ilya Kaminsky, Lisa Katz, and Farid Matuk |
| 2021 | Prose | Tejaswini Niranjana | No Presents Please: Mumbai Stories by Jayant Kaikini | Kannada | Jennifer Croft, Anton Hur, Annie Janusch |
| 2021 | Poetry | Geoffrey Brock | Allegria by Giuseppe Ungaretti | Italian | Sinan Antoon, Layla Benitez-James, Sibelan Forrester |
| 2022 | Prose | Martin Aitken | The Morning Star by Karl Ove Knausgaard | Norwegian | Suzanne Jill Levine, Arunava Sinha, Annie Tucker |
| 2022 | Poetry | D. M. Black | Purgatorio by Dante Alighieri | Italian | Hélène Cardona, Boris Dralyuk, Archana Venkatesan |
| 2023 | Prose | Nguyễn An Lý | Chinatown by Thuận | Vietnamese | Natascha Bruce, Shelley Frisch, Jason Grunebaum, Sawad Hussain, Lytton Smith |
| 2023 | Poetry | Robyn Creswell | The Threshold by Iman Mersal | Arabic | Pauline Fan, Heather Green, Shook |
| 2024 | Prose | Jamie Richards | The Hunger of Women by Marosia Castaldi | Italian | Philip Boehm, Shelley Fairweather-Vega, Will Forrester, Joon-Li Kim, poupeh missaghi |
| 2024 | Poetry | Cole Swensen | And the Street by Pierre Alferi | French | Kazim Ali, Ronnie Apter, Mary Jo Bang |
| 2025 | Prose | Barbara Romaine | Sand-Catcher by Omar Khalifah | Arabic | George Henson, Hoyoung Moon, Ilze Duarte, Manjushree, Thapa, Peter, Constantine |
| 2025 | Poetry | Daniel Owen | Document Shredding Museum by Afrizal Malna | Indonesian | Conor Bracken, Dongshin Chang, Rachel Galvin |

=== Lucien Stryk Asian Translation Prize ===
Since 2009 the Lucien Stryk Asian Translation Prize is awarded at the same time as the NTA by the ALTA and recognizes the best translation into English of book-length Asian poetry or source texts from Zen Buddhism published in the previous calendar year. It is named for Lucien Stryk, an American Zen poet and translator. The winning translator is awarded $6,000.

| Year | Translator | Book and author | Language |
|---|---|---|---|
| 2010 | Red Pine | In Such Hard Times: The Poetry of Wei Ying-wu by Wei Ying-wu | Chinese |
| 2011 | Charles Egan | Clouds Thick, Whereabouts Unknown: Poems by Zen Monks of China | Chinese |
| 2012 | Don Mee Choi | All the Garbage of the World, Unite! by Kim Hyesoon | Korean |
| 2013 | Lucas Klein | Notes on the Mosquito by Xi Chuan | Chinese |
| 2014 | Jonathan Chaves | Every Rock a Universe: The Yellow Mountains and Chinese Travel Writing | Chinese |
| 2015 | Eleanor Goodman | Something Crosses My Mind by Wang Xiaoni | Chinese |
| 2016 | Sawako Nakayasu | The Collected Poems of Chika Sagawa by Chika Sagawa | Japanese |
| 2017 | Jennifer Feeley | Not Written Words by Xi Xi | Chinese |
| 2018 | Bonnie Huie | Notes of a Crocodile by Qiu Miaojin | Chinese |
| 2019 | Don Mee Choi | Autobiography of Death by Kim Hyesoon | Korean |
| 2020 | Jake Levine, Soeun Seo, and Hedgie Choi | Hysteria by Kim Yi-deum | Korean |
| 2021 | Archana Venkatesan | Endless Song by Nammāḻvār | Tamil |
| 2022 | Jae Kim | Cold Candies by Lee Young-ju | Korean |
| 2023 | Wong May | In the Same Light: 200 Poems for Our Century From the Migrants & Exiles of the Tang Dynasty | Chinese |
| 2024 | Wen-chi Li and Colin Bramwell | Decapitated Poetry by Ko-hua Chen | Chinese |
| 2025 | Colin Leemarshall | Just Like by Lee Sumyeong | Korean |

=== Italian Prose in Translation Award ===
Since 2015 the Italian Prose in Translation Award (IPTA) recognizes the importance of contemporary Italian prose (fiction and literary non-fiction) and promotes the translation of Italian works into English. This $5,000 prize will be awarded annually to a translator of a work of Italian prose (fiction or literary non-fiction) published in the previous calendar year.

| Year | Translator | Book and author | Language |
|---|---|---|---|
| 2015 | Anne Milano Appel | Blindly by Claudio Magris | Italian |
| 2016 | Ann Goldstein | The Story of the Lost Child by Elena Ferrante | Italian |
| 2017 | Matthew Holden | We Want Everything by Nanni Balestrini | Italian |
| 2018 | Elizabeth Harris | For Isabel, A Mandala by Antonio Tabucchi | Italian |
| 2019 | Simon Carnell and Erica Segre | The Eight Mountains by Paolo Cognetti | Italian |
| 2020 | Frederika Randall | I Am God by Giacomo Sartori | Italian |
| 2021 | Stephen Twilley | Diary of a Foreigner in Paris by Curzio Malaparte | Italian & French |
| 2022 | Anna Chiafele and Lisa Pike | Penelope by Silvana La Spina | Italian |
| 2023 | Michael F. Moore | The Betrothed by Alessandro Manzoni | Italian |
