= Zama (film) =

2017 film

- Theatrical release poster
- Directed by: Lucrecia Martel
- Screenplay by: Lucrecia Martel
- Based on: Zama by Antonio di Benedetto
- Produced by: Vania Catani; Benjamin Domenech; Santiago Gallelli; Matias Roveda
- Starring: Daniel Giménez Cacho; Lola Dueñas; Matheus Nachtergaele; Juan Minujín
- Cinematography: Rui Poças
- Edited by: Miguel Schverdfinger; Karen Harley
- Production companies: El Deseo; Bananeira Filmes; Rei Cine
- Distributed by: Buena Vista International (Argentina/Latin America); The Match Factory (Worldwide)
- Release dates: 31 August 2017 (Venice); 28 September 2017 (Argentina)
- Running time: 115 minutes
- Countries: Argentina; Spain
- Languages: Spanish; Qom; Pilagá; Mbyá Guaraní
- Box office: $475,910

Zama [ˈsama] is a 2017 period drama film written and directed by Lucrecia Martel, based on the 1956 novel of the same name by Antonio di Benedetto. It premiered at the 74th Venice International Film Festival. It was also screened in the Masters section at the 2017 Toronto International Film Festival. On 29 September 2017, the Argentine Academy of Cinematography Arts and Sciences chose the film as the national entry for Best Foreign Language Film at the 90th Academy Awards and Best Iberoamerican Film at the 32nd Goya Awards.

In 2022, it was selected as the 19th greatest film of Argentine cinema in a poll organized in 2022 by the specialized magazines La vida útil, Taipei and La tierra quema, which was presented at the Mar del Plata International Film Festival.

== Plot ==
In the late 18th century Don Diego de Zama is a magistrate in a remote outpost in Argentina. His wife and children are far away and he longs to be assigned to a post in Lerma, a change he believes is imminent.

The town is plagued by rumours of the feats of Vicuña Porto, a man who robs and rapes at will and who others are always claiming to have met and defeated. Uninterested by the gossip, Zama spends his time trying to seduce the wealthy, married Spanish noblewoman Luciana Piñares de Luenga, who rebuffs him. At work, he comes into conflict with an assistant magistrate, Ventura Prieto, when the latter objects to the enslavement of indigenous people. The conflict is exacerbated by the discovery that Prieto has had more success with Luciana than he. After the two come to blows, the governor deports the junior functionary — to Lerma.

Zama learns that the governor, who had been promising to recommend his transfer, is being transferred himself by order of the King of Spain. Brokenhearted that he has not been transferred, Zama runs afoul of the new Governor when the Governor learns that one of the employees, whom Zama would prefer to protect, is writing a book while at work. The Governor orders Zama to read the book and issue a full report. Reluctantly Zama agrees. After he writes a damning report the Governor agrees to write a first letter of recommendation, revealing that the king always ignores first requests and a second one will take another 1–2 years to make its way to the king.

Defeated, Zama grows a beard and agrees to join a party of men looking to hunt down and kill Vicuña Porto. In the middle of the night Zama wakes to find the horses being stolen and has a conversation with one of the men in his group, who volunteers that he is Vicuña Porto.

Later, the men are captured by an indigenous tribe, who ultimately release them. The bedraggled survivors are nearing home, but the captain tells Zama they cannot return without Vicuña Porto, prompting Zama to reveal Vicuña Porto's identity. Porto, however, retains the loyalties of the remainder of the group, and his men tie up Zama and the captain. The men kill the captain and let Zama live as they believe he has information about hidden jewels that will make them rich (actually some worthless geodes mentioned in Ventura's book). When Zama tells them no such riches exist, they cut off his hands. Zama manages to survive but his future is uncertain as he awakes with no hands on a raft, having been rescued by an indigenous man and child.

== Cast ==
- Daniel Giménez Cacho as Don Diego de Zama
- Lola Dueñas as Luciana Piñares de Luenga
- Matheus Nachtergaele as Vicuña Porto
- Juan Minujín as Ventura Prieto

== Production ==
Director Nicolás Sarquís began attempting a filmed adaptation of Zama around 1984, but it was never completed. It was later to be featured in the 2018 experimental documentary film La Película Infinita.

The film had a slow production process with Martel first announcing her attachment to the film in 2012. The film was rumoured to begin filming by 2014, but a still was released in May 2015 shortly after filming actually began. The film then spent two years in post-production after Martel learned she had cancer and she struggled to maintain her health and complete the film.

== Reception and legacy ==
Zama received widespread acclaim from critics. On review aggregator website Rotten Tomatoes the film has an approval rating of 96% based on 116 reviews, with an average rating of 8.0/10. The website's critical consensus states, "Zama offers a series of scathingly insightful observations about colonialism and class dynamics — and satisfyingly ends a long wait between projects from writer-director Lucrecia Martel." Metacritic, another review aggregator, assigned the film a weighted average score of 89 out of 100, based on 26 critics, indicating "universal acclaim". Following its screening at the Toronto International Film Festival, The A.V. Club's A.A. Dowd gave the film a B+ grade and wrote: "Zama, despite its setting, isn’t such a radical departure for Martel; it preserves her talent for tracking an individual through chaotic social spheres".

Upon its theatrical release, Zama received universal acclaim from the Argentine press. On the Argentine website Todas Las Críticas, which collects local reviews, the film has an average rating of 82 out of 100 and an approval rating of 88%, based on 41 reviews. Luciano Monteagudo of Página/12 praised Martel's direction and considered Zama to be "a new peak in her work, a film with a visual and sound complexity that is out of the norm in contemporary cinema, capable of breaking with narrative linearity to go in search of a colonial past that can only be imagined in a fragmentary way, as one who explores his identity in the remnants of what is called History." An enthusiastic review came from Clarín's Pablo O. Scholz, who called it "an invitation to the senses, a film that floods, overflows in more than one meaning" and a "captivating experience." Writing for La Nación, María Fernanda Mugica stated that Zama was "work of art that requires an attentive, patient and open viewer", feeling that "it is admired since the first shot but it begins to be better appreciated later, when the fascination for the beauty of the images and the intensity of the sounds leave room in the viewer for a connection with the frustration experienced by its protagonist". Writing for Otros Cines, Diego Batlle gave the film the highest rating and compared it to the works of Terrence Malick, Werner Herzog, John Ford and Claire Denis, while stating: "but Martel's cinema is unique, non-transferable, inimitable, incomparable."

In 2019 TIFF Cinematheque named the film the best film of the decade as voted on by Canadian journalists, critics, and historians.

Peter Bradshaw, chief film critic of The Guardian, listed the film as one of his ten votes for the Sight and Sound 2022 poll for the greatest films of all time.

== See also ==
- List of films featuring slavery
- List of submissions to the 90th Academy Awards for Best Foreign Language Film
- List of Argentine submissions for the Academy Award for Best Foreign Language Film
