= Piazza Italia =

Piazza Italia or Piazza d'Italia may refer to:

- Piazza d'Italia, Sassari
- Piazza d'Italia, New Orleans
- Piazza d'Italia (novel), a 1975 novel by Antonio Tabucchi
- Piazza Italia (restaurant), Portland, Oregon, U.S.
