= H. E. Francis Award =

American short fiction prize

The H. E. Francis Award is a literary prize presented in short fiction by the University of Alabama in Huntsville in conjunction with the Ruth Hindman Foundation. It is named after novelist and short story writer H. E. Francis. Previous winners include M. M. De Voe, Roberta K. Carter and Kate Small.

The most recent winner for the 2015 award was Jeremy Kamps for his story "The Source of Everything".

The 2015 finalists were:

Jenna Cohen for "Stand Clear", Daniel Faine for "The Shah", Helen Morris for "LOL", Jonathan Reilly for "Don't Spit on the Railway", Bob Saul for "Lucky", Jill Sexsmith for "The End of the World",

The 2015 semifinalists were:

Eric Boyd for "Wayward", Jane Eaton Hamilton for "The Storm Chaser", Rami Nashashibi for "A Rising Fall", Sasha Sedan for "Dots of Red in a Seasonal Glory", Robert Shuster for "Scenes from a Life of Sport", and Evelyn Walsh for "Potion".

== See also ==
- List of American literary awards
- List of literary awards
