= Nocturne Indien =

- Directed by: Alain Corneau
- Written by: Alain Corneau; Louis Gardel
- Based on: Notturno Indiano by Antonio Tabucchi
- Produced by: Maurice Bernart
- Starring: Jean-Hugues Anglade; Otto Tausig
- Cinematography: Yves Angelo
- Edited by: Thierry Derocles
- Distributed by: UGC Distribution
- Release date: August 16, 1989 (France)
- Running time: 110 min
- Country: France
- Language: French
- Box office: $3.4 million

Nocturne indien is a 1989 French film directed by Alain Corneau, based on the novel Notturno Indiano by Italian writer Antonio Tabucchi.

== Cast and roles ==
- Jean-Hugues Anglade as Rossignol / Xavier
- Clémentine Célarié as Christine
- Otto Tausig as Peter Schlemihl
- T.P. Jain as Doctor
- Iftekhar as Theosophy professor
- Maniyanpilla Raju as Restaurant owner
