= The Endless Film =

2018 Argentinian experimental documentary film

- Directed by: Leandro Listorti
- Screenplay by: Leandro Listorti
- Produced by: Paula Zyngierman; Leandro Listorti; Gustavo Beck
- Edited by: Felipe Guerrero
- Production company: MaravillaCine
- Release date: May 4, 2018 (Argentina)
- Running time: 53 minutes
- Country: Argentina
- Box office: $190

La Película Infinita (The Endless Film or The Infinite Film) is a 2018 Argentinian experimental documentary film directed by Leandro Listorti, his first feature-length work.

== Summary ==
La Película Infinita is a film essay featuring an assemblage of never completed films from the 1950s onwards from archives of a Buenos Aires film museum (for which the director is also curator), presenting an alternate parallel history of film and tracing a national cinema that never was invoking the ghosts of the country's dictatorial past.

== Films featured ==
The following films were featured in unfinished fragments:

- Nicolás Sarquís’s failed 1984 adaptation of Zama (1984)
- El eternauta (Hugo Gil; 1968)
- La neutrónica explotó en Burzaco (Alejandro Agresti; 1984)
- Sistema español (Martín Rejtman; 1988)
- El ocio (Mariano Llinás and Agustín Mendilaharzu; 1999)

== Release ==
It was released in Argentina on August 2, 2018 where it grossed $190.

== Reception ==
A review compared this assemblage of films to the "Frankenstein's method". Another review found the film was failed and "mechanical". A more appreciative assessment can be found at Desistfilm: "It is likely that everything lost at some point can have a second life, from the words that were not said to the images that were not filmed, La Película Infinita is just a sample of that videolibrary of Babel that is hidden somewhere and where all the lost cinema is kept; and we need more Listortis and Bill Morrisons that know how to show them before our eyes."

== See also ==
- Film preservation
- Lost film
- Zama - a 2017 film directed by Lucrecia Martel
- La Memoria Infinita
