= Indian Nocturne =

1984 novella by Antonio Tabucchi

- First edition
- Author: Antonio Tabucchi
- Original title: Notturno indiano
- Translator: Tim Parks
- Language: Italian
- Publisher: Sellerio editore
- Publication date: 1984
- Publication place: Italy
- English publication date: 1988
- Pages: 109
- ISBN: 88-389-0255-0

Indian Nocturne (Italian: Notturno indiano) is a 1984 novella by the Italian writer Antonio Tabucchi. It tells the story of a man on a search for his mysterious friend in India. The book won the French Prix Médicis étranger in 1987. Alain Corneau directed a 1989 French film adaptation with the title Nocturne indien.

== See also ==
- 1984 in literature
- Italian literature
