= Tony Arnold =

Tony Arnold may refer to:

- Tony Arnold (baseball) (born 1959), American baseball player
- Tony Arnold (soprano), American soprano
