= Esther Allen =

American writer (born 1962)

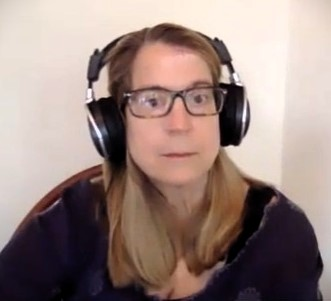
- Allen in 2020
- Born: June 29, 1962 (age 64)
- Occupations: Writer, translator

Esther Allen (born June 29, 1962) is a writer, professor, and translator of French-language and Spanish-language literature into English. She is on the faculties of Baruch College (Department of Modern Languages & Comparative Literature) and the Graduate Center, CUNY (Hispanic and Luso-Brazilian Ph.D. Program; French Ph.D. Program). Allen co-founded PEN World Voices: the New York Festival of International Literature (2004), and worked with PEN/Heim Translation Fund Grants from their inception in 2003 to 2010. Allen heads the Development Committee of the American Literary Translators Association, and serves on the board of Writers Omi, part of Omi International Arts Center, on the Advisory Council to the Spanish-language program at the CUNY Graduate School of Journalism, and on the Selection Committee for the French Voices translation subvention program of the Services culturels français.

== Selected works ==
=== Selected translations ===
- Zama, introduction and first English-language translation of 1956 Spanish-language novel by Antonio di Benedetto. Di Benedetto, Antonio (August 23, 2016). Zama. Translated by Allen, Esther. New York City: New York Review Books (published 2016). ISBN 9781590177174.
- José Martí's Selected Writings (Penguin Classics), editor and translator. Selected Writings (Penguin Classics). Penguin Classics. April 30, 2002. ISBN 9780142437049.
- Dancing with Cuba: A Memoir of the Revolution, English-language translation of Spanish-language manuscript by Alma Guillermoprieto. Dancing with Cuba: A Memoir of the Revolution. Vintage Books. 2005. ISBN 9780375725814. Guillermoprieto wrote in the book's Acknowledgements: Esther Allen "turned my stammering Spanish-language manuscript into an English text far more beautiful and assured than I could have written."
- In Her Absence, English-language translation of 2001 Spanish-language novel by Antonio Muñoz Molina. Muñoz Molina, Antonio (July 17, 2007). In Her Absence. Translated by Allen, Esther. New York City: Other Press (published 2007). ISBN 9781590512531. Reviewer Michael Kern Johnson called the work "an assured translation from Esther Allen that captures beautifully the shifting subtleties of tone and mood... satirical, and even very funny ... touching and painful."
- Selected Non-Fictions (Penguin), English-language translation of Spanish-language works by Jorge Luis Borges. Edited by Eliot Weinberger and co-translated with Weinberger and Suzanne Jill Levine. Selected Non-Fictions. Penguin Classics (published 2000). November 2000. ISBN 9780140290110.
- The Book of Lamentations (Classic, 20th-Century, Penguin), English-language translation of 1962 Spanish-language novel by Rosario Castellanos. Translation originally published 1996 by Marsilio Publishers. The Book of Lamentations. Penguin Classics (published 1998). August 1998. ISBN 9780141180038.
- Dark Back of Time (Vintage International), English-language translation of Spanish-language novel by Javier Marías. Translation originally published 2001. Dark Back of Time. Vintage Books (published 2013). April 23, 2013. ISBN 9780307950741.
- The Tale of the Rose: The Love Story Behind The Little Prince, English-language translation of French-language memoir by Consuelo de Saint-Exupéry published post-humously in France in 2000. The Tale of the Rose: The Love Story Behind The Little Prince. Random House (published 2003). January 14, 2003. ISBN 9780812967173.

=== Selected other ===
- Co-edited with Susan Bernofsky. Allen, Esther (2013). In Translation: Translators on Their Work and What It Means. Columbia University Press. ISBN 9780231159692.
- Co-edited with Sean Cotter and Russell Scott Valentino. The Man Between: Michael Henry Heim and a Life in Translation, co-editor and contributor. Tribute to Michael Henry Heim. The Man Between: Michael Henry Heim and a Life in Translation. Open Letter (published 2014). 2005. ISBN 9780375725814.
- Editor, To Be Translated or Not To Be, published in English, Catalan and German and distributed at the 2007 Frankfurt Book Fair. Commissioned by PEN International and the Institut Ramon Llull.

== Awards and fellowships ==
- Fellow, Guggenheim Foundation, 2018.
- 2017 National Translation Award of the American Literary Translators Association for English-language translation of Zama, published by New York Review Books.
- Biography Fellow, Leon Levy Center for Biography, 2014–2015.
- Awardee, Feliks Gross Awards, City University of New York Academy for the Arts and Sciences, 2012.
- Fellow, Cullman Center for Scholars and Writers at the New York Public Library, 2009–2010.
- Chevalier, Ordre des Arts et des Lettres, 2006.
- Translation Fellowship, National Endowment for the Arts, 1995 and 2010.
