= Fiona Sze-Lorrain =

French musician, poet, literary translator, and editor

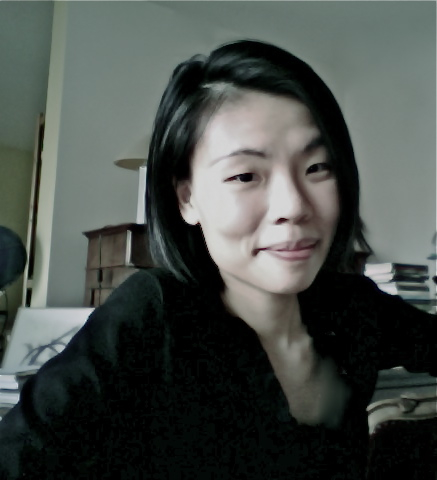
- Fiona Sze-Lorrain
- Born: 1980 (age 45–46); Singapore
- Education: Columbia University (B.A.); New York University (M.A.); Paris-Sorbonne University (Ph.D., French); École Normale de Musique de Paris
- Occupations: Writer, poet, translator, editor, harpist, musician
- Spouse: Philippe Lorrain
- Writing career
- Language: English, French, Chinese
- Genres: Fiction, Poetry, Music
- Website: fionasze.com

Fiona Sze-Lorrain (born 1980) is a French writer, poet, literary translator, editor, and musician. She writes in English and translates from Chinese and French. Her fiction, poetry, and translations have received recognition, shortlisted and longlisted for the Andrew Carnegie Medals for Excellence, the Los Angeles Times Book Prize, the Best Translated Book Award, the PEN Award for Poetry in Translation, and the Lucien Stryk Asian Translation Prize, among others. She has performed widely as a zheng harpist. Alongside her literary and artistic work, she is involved in negotiation, mediation, and conflict resolution. She is a judge for the 2025 International Dublin Literary Award and the inaugural John Calder Translation Prize.

== Early life and education ==
A French citizen born in Singapore, Sze-Lorrain grew up trilingual and has lived mostly in Paris and New York City. She spent her childhood in a hybrid of cultures and her formative years in the United States and France. She began studying classical piano and guzheng at a young age. A graduate of Columbia University, she obtained her master's degree from New York University and attended the École Normale de Musique de Paris before earning a PhD in French from the Paris-Sorbonne University.

== Work ==
Sze-Lorrain's work involves fiction, poetry, translation, music, theater, and the visual arts. She writes mainly in English and translates from Chinese and French. She also works with Spanish, Italian, and Japanese. She has written for venues related to fashion journalism, music and art criticism, and dramaturgy.

In 2007, Sze-Lorrain worked with Gao Xingjian on a book of photography, essays, and poetry based on his film Silhouette/Shadow.

Through Mark Strand, whose work she would later translate into French, she found her poetic vocation, crediting him for having introduced her to poetry. Sze-Lorrain's debut poetry collection, Water the Moon, appeared in 2010, followed by My Funeral Gondola in 2013. Her third collection, The Ruined Elegance, was published by Princeton University Press in the Princeton Series of Contemporary Poets in 2016 and was named one of Library Journal 's Best Books in Poetry for 2015. It was also a finalist for the 2016 Los Angeles Times Book Prize.

Published during the COVID-19 pandemic, her fourth collection Rain in Plural (Princeton University Press, 2020) contains many "poems that resonate with a political undertone, and they often suggest in the midst of great threats we persist and continue our important work, aware we alone are not the only or even the most vulnerable. The poems care about the larger world and our current crises." Rain in Plural was a finalist for the 2021 Derek Walcott Prize for Poetry.

In response to the pandemic in Paris, Sze-Lorrain wrote a setting of new poems The Year of the Rat, set to music by Peter Child for unaccompanied voices, and virtually premiered in February 2021 by the solo artists of the Cantata Singers and Ensemble in Boston. Child collaborated with Sze-Lorrain again for her poem "Untouchable" in his song cycle A Golden Apple: Six Poems of Intimacy and Loss (2023), premiered by Tony Arnold at MIT.

In 2023, Scribner published Fiona Sze-Lorrain's novel in stories Dear Chrysanthemums. Set in Shanghai, Beijing, Singapore, Paris, and New York, following a cast of Asian women from 1946 to 2016, the critically acclaimed work of fiction "illuminates Asian women’s resilience across decades of personal, political, and economic upheaval." These "women’s stories weave together in understated and inventive ways" while "the novel serves as "a multilayered meditation on intergenerational trauma, memory, and resilience." Dear Chrysanthemums has been longlisted for the 2024 Andrew Carnegie Medal for Excellence in Fiction.

Sze-Lorrain practices Japanese and Chinese calligraphy and ink work. Her poems and translations, handwritten in ink, were exhibited alongside ink drawings by Fritz Horstman from the Josef and Anni Albers Foundation in the art show, A Blue Dark, at The Institute Library (New Haven) in 2019.

== Critical response ==
The New York Times Book Review praises her stories as "nimble, evocative."

The Rumpus said of her writing that it "serves as a vital midwife for the greater global understanding that will one day be born from today’s contracting and relaxing tensions between differing religions, cultures, and languages."

Prairie Schooner describes her work as an "arc" that "navigates the sense of otherness" with poems that "burst at the seams with the customs, gastronomy, ancestry, literature, and art of the two cultures."

Publishers Weekly calls her novel in stories "graceful" and "this author is one to watch" as she "effortlessly evokes the spirit of each setting" and "imbues her characters with haunting melancholy."

Mekong Review writes that her fiction "resonates with a rich and efficient prosody. The narrative structure is creative, with each story placing an increasingly complete puzzle on top of the last."

The Washington Post describes her translation as "lyrical."

== Translation ==
Sze-Lorrain is a translator of contemporary American, French, and Chinese poetry and prose. She is named the most prolific translator in modern and contemporary Chinese poetry. Her translations were shortlisted for the 2020 Derek Walcott Prize for Poetry and the 2016 Best Translated Book Award, and longlisted for the 2014 PEN Award for Poetry in Translation. She has been awarded the 2026 Lucien Stryk Asian Translation Prize for her translation of Zhang Zao's Mirror. She serves on the committee of the Translators Association of the Society of Authors in the UK.

== Editor ==
She is a cofounder of Cerise Press (2009–13), a corresponding editor of Mānoa (2012–14), and an editor at Vif Éditions.

== Residencies and fellowships ==
The recipient of fellowships from Yaddo, Ledig House, and the Helene Wurlitzer Foundation, among others, she is the inaugural writer-in-residence at MALBA in Buenos Aires. She has also been a visiting writer-poet at various colleges and universities in United States and Europe. She is a 2019-20 Abigail R. Cohen Fellow at the Columbia Institute for Ideas and Imagination.

== Music ==
As a classical zheng harpist, Sze-Lorrain has performed worldwide since 2003. Her concert venues include Carnegie Hall, Lincoln Center, Merkin Hall, World Music Hall of Wesleyan, Maison des cultures du monde, UNESCO, among numerous others. She has served as a festival and competition judge.

Sze-Lorrain adapted and arranged (for zheng's duet with erhu) Shigeru Umebayashi’s theme music of Wong Kar-wai’s In the Mood for Love.

== Personal life ==
Sze-Lorrain lives in Paris with her husband Philippe Lorrain, cofounder of the French magazine Interférences (1974–1982), art director and independent publisher.

== Publications ==
=== Fiction ===
- Dear Chrysanthemums, 2023. ISBN 978-1-668-01298-7

=== Poetry ===
- Rain in Plural, 2020. ISBN 978-0-691-20356-0
- The Ruined Elegance, 2016. ISBN 978-0-691-16769-5
- Invisible Eye, 2015. ISBN 978-2-9541146-3-7
- My Funeral Gondola, 2013. ISBN 978-0-98339198-2
- Water the Moon, 2010. ISBN 978-1-934851-12-8

=== Chapbook ===
- Not Meant as Poems, 2018.

=== Collaboration ===
- Untouchable in A Golden Apple: Six Poems of Intimacy and Loss (2023), set to music by Peter Child, premiered by Tony Arnold, 2023.
- The Year of the Rat, set to music by Peter Child, premiered by Amy Lieberman, Xiao Shi, Sheryl Krevsky Elkin, and Karyl Ryczek from the Cantata Singers and Ensemble, 2021.
- A Blue Dark with Fritz Horstman, 2019. ISBN 978-2-954-11465-1

=== Translations ===
- Ocean, as Much as Rain: Stories, Lyrical Prose, and Poems from Tibet by Tsering Woeser, with Dechen Pemba, 2026. ISBN 978-1-4780-3311-0
- Mirror: Selected Poems by Zhang Zao, 2025. ISBN 978-193-889-035-2
- Moonlight Rests on My Left Palm: Poems and Essays by Yu Xiuhua, 2021. ISBN 978-166-260-047-0
- Green Mountain by Yang Jian, 2020. ISBN 978-1-937385-36-1
- Karma by Yin Lichuan, 2020. ISBN 978-1-948800-29-7
- My Mountain Country by Ye Lijun, 2019. ISBN 978-0-9992613-4-7
- Trace by Yu Xiang, 2017.
- Sea Summit by Yi Lu, 2016. ISBN 978-1-571-31476-5
- Chariots of Women by Amang, 2016. ISBN 978-9-869-29840-7
- A Tree Planted in Summer by Ling Yu, 2015. ISBN 978-2-9541146-4-4
- Writing before Sleep by Na Ye, 2015. ISBN 978-7-5001433-1-4
- The City Is a Novel by photographer Alexey Titarenko, with essays by Gabriel Bauret, Sean Corcoran, and Brett Abbott, 2015. ISBN 978-88-6208-414-7
- Canyon in the Body by Lan Lan, 2014. ISBN 978-1-938890-01-7
- Nails by Lan Lan, 2013. ISBN 978-962-996-627-0
- I Can Almost See the Clouds of Dust by Yu Xiang, 2013. ISBN 978-0-9832970-9-3
- Wind Says by Bai Hua, 2012. ISBN 978-0-9832970-6-2
- To the One Who Writes Poetry Tonight by Yu Xiang, 2012.
- Presque invisible (Almost Invisible) by Mark Strand, 2012. ISBN 978-2-9541146-1-3
- Low Key by Yu Xiang, 2011. ISBN 978-962-996-532-7
- Mingus, méditations by Auxeméry, 2011
- "Ghérasim Luca Portfolio" by Ghérasim Luca in Poetry International, 2010. ISBN 978-187-969-193-3
- "The Way of the Wandering Bird" by Gao Xingjian, with Ned Burgess, in Silhouette/Shadow: The Cinematic Art of Gao Xingjian, 2007. ISBN 978-981-05-9207-3

=== Edited/Co-edited ===
- Starry Island: New Writing from Singapore, 2014. ISBN 978-0-8248-4797-5
- On Freedom: Spirit, Art, and State, 2013. ISBN 978-0-8248-3855-3
- Sky Lanterns: New Poetry from China, Formosa, and Beyond, 2012. ISBN 978-0-8248-3698-6
- Cerise Press: A Journal of Literature, Arts & Culture, Vol. 1 Issue 1-Vol. 5 Issue 13, 2009–2013. ISSN 1946-5262
- Silhouette/Shadow: The Cinematic Art of Gao Xingjian, 2007. ISBN 978-981-05-9207-3
- Interculturalism: Exploring Critical Issues, 2004. ISBN 978-1-904710-07-3

=== CD ===
- Une seule prise (In One Take), 2010. UPC 3–760201–400005

Film

- Rain in Plural . . . and Beyond, 2021. Columbia Institute for Ideas and Imagination.

== Awards and honors ==
- 2026 Lucien Stryk Asian Translation Prize
- 2024 Andrew Carnegie Medal for Excellence in Fiction Longlisted
- 2021 Derek Walcott Prize for Poetry Finalist
- 2020 Derek Walcott Prize for Poetry Finalist
- 2016 Los Angeles Times Book Prize Finalist
- 2016 Best Translated Book Award Finalist
- 2014 PEN Award for Poetry in Translation Longlisted
- 2014 New Generation Indie Book Awards Finalist
- 2011 Eric Hoffer Book Award Honorable Mention
