= Shinkichi Takahashi =

Shinkichi Takahashi (高橋 新吉, Takahashi Shinkichi; 1901 – 1987) was a Japanese poet. He was one of the pioneers of Dadaism in Japan. According to Makoto Ueda, he is also the only major Zen poet of modern Japanese literature.

He was born on Shikoku.

His Collected Poems won the Japanese Ministry of Education Prize for Art.

== Works ==
- Dadaist Shinkichi's Poetry 1923
- Triumph of the Sparrow: Zen Poems of Shinkichi Takahashi Translated by Lucien Stryk and Takashi Ikemoto. Grove Press, 2000
- After Images: Zen Poems by Shinkichi Takahashi Translated by Lucien Stryk and Takashi Ikemoto. Doubleday, Anchor Books, 1972
- Halbur, Adam. Seascape. (verse)
- Spanish translation: En la quietud del mundo. Translated by José Luis Fernández Castillo and Kyoko Mizoguchi. Madrid, Pre-textos, 2018.
