= Yu Xiuhua =

Chinese poet (born 1976)

- 余秀华
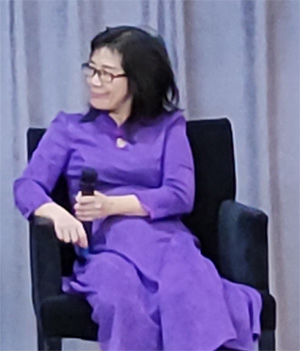
- Born: March 22, 1976 (age 50); Zhongxiang, Hubei, China
- Occupations: Poet, farmer
- Writing career
- Language: Chinese
- Period: 2009-present
- Genre: Poem
- Notable work: I Crossed Half of China to Sleep with You

Yu Xiuhua (simplified Chinese: 余秀华; traditional Chinese: 余秀華; pinyin: Yú Xiùhuá; born 1976) is a Chinese poet. She lives in the small village of Hengdian, Shipai, Zhongxiang, Hubei, China, and has cerebral palsy resulting in speech and mobility difficulties. Despite this, she still writes poetry, and as of January 2015 Xiuhua has written over two thousand poems.

In 2014, her poem I Crossed Half of China to Sleep with You (穿过大半个中国去睡你) was reposted frequently in WeChat, leading to a significant increase in her notoriety. In the same year, the poem magazine, a national magazine of China, published her poetry, which made her work even more famous. Still Tomorrow a documentary about her rise to fame and relationship with her family as well as her divorce from her husband, was released in 2016, and has been showcased in different film festivals. Moonlight Rests on My Left Palm, a collection of poems and essays in writer, poet, and translator Fiona Sze-Lorrain's translation, is out from Astra House in 2021.

== Biography ==
=== Life in Hengdian village ===
In 1976, Yu Xiuhua was born in Hengdian, Shipai, Zhongxiang, Hubei, China to a family of farmers. Due to breech presentation and hypoxia, she was born with cerebral palsy, making speaking and mobilizing difficult. When Yu grew up, she could neither do farm work nor attend university because of her disability. In her second year of high school, she stopped her studies and stayed at home out of work. After that, poetry became a strong focus.

Before 2015, Yu still lived in Hengdian with her parents, leading a simple life. At home, she did some housework, fed the rabbits and wrote her poetry. In Hengdian's rural setting, Yu did not have an audience for her work.

=== Family ===
In 1995, when Yu was 19, she entered an arranged marriage organised by her mother. Yu married Yin Shiping, 12 years her elder. He was not often home, and when they were together, they always quarreled. The marriage produced a son. Yu Xiuhua and Yin Shiping divorced in September 2015.

Yu's parents continued to provide for her until her anthology was published.

In 2016, Yu's mother died of lung cancer.

=== Writing experience ===
In 1998, Yu Xiuhua wrote her first poem "Imprinting (印痕)".

In 2009, Yu Xiuhua started to write poetry regularly. Her poetry includes themes of her love, affection, life sentiment, her disability and the closed village she cannot escape. [9]

In November 2014, the poem magazine published her poems.

In January 2015, Yu's first anthology of poems, "The moonlight falls on my left hand (月光落在左手上)" was published by Guangxi Normal University Press. On 28 January, Yu was elected vice chairman of Zhongxiang City Writers Association of Hubei Province. In February of the same year, Hunan Literature and Art Publishing House published her poetry collection, "Still Tomorrow (摇摇晃晃的人间)".

On 15 May 2016, Yu Xiuhua's third book "We loved and then forgot (我们爱过又忘记)" was published in Beijing. On 1 November 2016, in the third Chinese "Peasant Literature Award" ceremony, Yu Xiuhua won the special "Peasant Literature Award", and received a 100,000 yuan bonus.

In March 2022, in response to the Russian invasion of Ukraine, Yu published a poem titled "Prayer", where she criticised the invasion. In response, she was subjected to trolling by internet users who maintained a pro-Russian stance. Eventually, the poem was taken down from Chinese social media platforms by censors.

== Works ==
Anthology of poems

- The Moonlight Rests on My Left Hand, (in Chinese, "Yue Guang Luo Zai Zuo Shou Shang") (月光落在左手上), 2015
- Still Tomorrow (摇摇晃晃的人间), 2015
- We Loved and Then Forgot (我们爱过又忘记), 2016
- Stop #8: poems by Yu Xiuhua, The Caravan: Contemporary Chinese Poetry, Edited and translated by Jin Zhong (大篷车：当代中国诗歌，第八站余秀华诗歌，金重编译)

== Characteristics of her poetry ==
Yu Xiuhua's poetry includes themes of her love, affection, life sentiment, her disability and the closed village she cannot escape.

She has written many love poems. Critics have noted that her experiences of social marginalization and disability inform her treatment of love, and that her work presents a complex female subjectivity.

Her poems are filled with the complex meaning of love and the calling, the disillusionment of love and the realization. Love is what makes the poet ask questions about existence, truth, death and other metaphysical problems and ontological subjects.
