= In Translation: Translators on Their Work and What It Means =

In Translation: Translators on Their Work and What It Means is a 2013 book edited by Esther Allen and Susan Bernofsky, published by Columbia University Press.

It is about dimensions of translating works from other languages into English. The book has 18 essays total.

== Background ==
Several of the authors are translators, while others - such as novelists Haruki Murakami and Jose Manuel Prieto, poets Peter Cole and Forrest Gander, and essayist Eliot Weinberger - are best known as writers in their own right. The anthology features renowned translators Clare Cavanagh, David Bellos and Maureen Freely among others.

Almost all of the articles had been previously published. Of those, the earliest article was first published in 2003, and the latest one was published in 2011. Elizabeth Heffington of the Lipscomb University Library characterized some of the authors of the individual articles as "well-known" and some of them as "lesser known".

== Content ==
The editors wrote the introduction, which describes how English has become the worldwide lingua franca and consequences of this.

Many of the articles cite many of the same sources. Publishers Weekly stated that this is because the subject of the work is a highly specialized field, and that the effect is that "the chapters occasionally blur together."

Haruki Murakami is the author of one of the articles.

== Reception ==
Publishers Weekly ranked it as a PW pick and described it as "a strong introduction to the field."

Kirkus Reviews stated that a non-academic reader may have difficulty with the density of the prose. Heffington stated that a reader without an academic background can comprehend the book although it would be a "challenge". Daniel C. Villanueva of University of Nevada, Reno described the prose as "scholarly but accessible".
