= The Woman of Porto Pim =

1983 short story collections by Antonio Tabucchi

- Author: Antonio Tabucchi
- Original title: Donna di Porto Pim
- Translator: Tim Parks
- Language: Italian
- Publisher: Sellerio Editore
- Publication date: 1983
- Publication place: Italy
- English publication date: 1991
- Pages: 96
- ISBN: 883890233X

The Woman of Porto Pim (Italian: Donna di Porto Pim) is a 1983 short story collection by the Italian writer Antonio Tabucchi. It revolves around the Azores archipelago, features whales and shipwrecks as metaphors, and uses fragments to express a fascination with Portuguese culture.

Tim Parks' English translation was first published by Chatto & Windus in 1991 in a volume that also includes Tabucchi's short story collections Vanishing Point and The Flying Creatures of Fra Angelico. It was published in its own volume by Archipelago Books in 2013.

The Woman of Porto Pim was one of three finalists for the 1984 Grinzane Cavour Prize for Italian fiction. In 2013, Monica Seger wrote in World Literature Today that although the book is one of Tabucchi's earlier works, it reads like a work by a mature author.
