= The Missing Head of Damasceno Monteiro =

1997 novel by Antonio Tabucchi

- First edition
- Author: Antonio Tabucchi
- Original title: La testa perduta di Damasceno Monteiro
- Translator: Patrick Creagh
- Language: Italian
- Publisher: Feltrinelli
- Publication date: 1 March 1997
- Publication place: Italy
- English publication date: 1999
- Pages: 239
- ISBN: 88-07-01518-8

The Missing Head of Damasceno Monteiro (Italian: La testa perduta di Damasceno Monteiro) is a 1997 crime novel by the Italian writer Antonio Tabucchi. It is set in Porto, Portugal, and follows a murder investigation after a headless body has been found.

== Reception ==
Michael Pye of The New York Times called the novel "a vivid book" and wrote that Tabucchi "writes with all his senses". He noted how the book often reflects on subjects in ways conventional crime novels do not, and wrote: "Much of this works very well, but you should be warned about Tabucchi's tendency to slam the door on the captive reader and start a seminar. ... You may sometimes want to snort with exasperation and send Tabucchi's book skirling across the room. But, then again, when did you last find a novel this interesting?"

== See also ==
- 1997 in literature
- Italian literature
