= Europa (novel) =

1997 novel by Tim Parks

- Author: Tim Parks
- Publisher: Arcade Publishing
- Publication date: October 1, 1998
- ISBN: 1-55970-444-6

Europa is a stream of consciousness novel by Tim Parks, first published in 1997. It was shortlisted for the Booker Prize in that year, losing out to Arundhati Roy's The God of Small Things.

== Synopsis ==
Jerry Marlow is a neurotic obsessive whose first-person narration describes a coach trip he and several colleagues take to Strasbourg in order to petition the European Parliament for improved working conditions for foreign university teachers working in Italy. While observing the idiosyncrasies of his colleagues, Marlow constantly revisits personal anxieties about relationships with his ex-lover, his wife, and his daughter. In a surprising tragicomic ending, Marlow realizes both success and failure, all somehow entwined and impossible to separate.

== Critical reception ==
Europa received mixed reviews to positive reviews, largely centering on the characterization of Parks' protagonist, Marlow. Kirkus Reviews considered Parks' execution impressive, comparing Marlow to James Joyce's character Leopold Bloom from acclaimed work Ulysses: "The obsessiveness of the male mind has rarely been so well rendered since a certain Bloom gave himself over to thoughts of Molly."

Alternatively, David Gates, writing for The New York Times, expressed disappointment in the novel: "Parks may be an old pro, but this is amateur stuff. All the fiction-writing manuals warn against such self-indulgence, but it's still a bad idea."
