= Pierre Hourcade =

French Lusitanist and translator of Fernando Pessoa

- Born: 6 August 1908; Châlons-en-Champagne, France
- Died: 3 February 1983 (aged 74); Aix-en-Provence, France
- Occupations: Literary critic, translator, academic

Pierre Hourcade (6 August 1908 – 3 February 1983) was a French Romanist, Lusitanist and literary scholar. He is best known as the first French translator of Fernando Pessoa and as a pioneering advocate of Portuguese literature in France.

== Life and career ==
Hourcade studied at the École Normale Supérieure in Paris and subsequently at the University of Coimbra in Portugal. In the preface to Temas de Literatura portuguesa, Hourcade credits reading Philological Divertissement by Valery Larbaud to his interest in the richness of Portuguese language.

From 1930 to 1931, he was assistant to Léon Bourdon as Bourdon created the Institut Français in Portugal. Then until 1932, he was a lecturer in French at Coimbra. From 1935 to 1938, he taught French literature at the University of São Paulo. In 1938, he returned to Portugal to direct the Institut Français in Porto. Then, from 1941 to 1962, he was Director of the Institut Français in Lisbon. During this time he served as cultural attaché at the French Embassy. In 1962 he was appointed director of the French Institute of Latin America by the Ministry of Foreign Affairs. During this time he was also the cultural attaché of the French embassy in Mexico. He then became a cultural advisor in Ankara until his retirement in 1973. He settled in Aix-en-Provence and continued to teach at the university there.

Hourcade translated works by Jorge Amado and Eça de Queirós into French, and contributed extensively to the study of Portuguese and Brazilian literature throughout his career. He helped create the Bulletin of Portuguese Theatre History which was published from 1950 to 1954. He was requested to write prefaces for several books. His work, beyond the poetry of Pessoa, focused on Portuguese and Brazilian modernism and also on nineteenth century Romanticism.

== Pessoa ==
Between 1930 and 1935, he became personally acquainted with Fernando Pessoa. During this period he published several articles in French journals, beginning with Rencontre avec Fernando Pessoa in the Parisian review Contacts (1930), in which he argued that Pessoa was the most important Portuguese poet and one of the great figures of world poetry — a bold claim at a time when Pessoa was virtually unknown outside Portugal. It was through Hourcade that Pessoa began to be internationally recognized.

His 1933 essay Brève Introduction à Fernando Pessoa, published in the influential Cahiers du Sud, is considered one of the earliest serious critical introductions to Pessoa in French.

His work directly influenced later translators and scholars, including Armand Guibert, who acknowledged Hourcade as the one who first opened the path to Pessoa in France. Hourcade is also mentioned in the early life of Italian novelist Antonio Tabucchi, who first encountered Pessoa through a French translation by Hourcade at a Paris bookstall in the 1960s.

== Selected works ==
- Panorama du modernisme littéraire au Portugal (1930)
- Rencontre avec Fernando Pessoa, in Contacts, Paris (1930)
- Brève Introduction à Fernando Pessoa, in Cahiers du Sud (1933)
- Temas de Literatura Portuguesa (1978)
- A Mais Incerta das Certezas: itinerário poético de Fernando Pessoa (posth. 2016, ed. Fernando Carmino Marques)
- Bulletin des Études Portugaises (contributions from 1931 to 1977)

=== Translator ===
- Bahia of All Saints, by Jorge Amado
