= Little Misunderstandings of No Importance =

1985 short story collection by Antonio Tabucchi

- First edition
- Author: Antonio Tabucchi
- Original title: Piccoli equivoci senza importanza
- Translator: Frances Frenaye
- Language: Italian
- Publisher: Feltrinelli
- Publication date: 1985
- Publication place: Italy
- English publication date: 1987
- Pages: 153
- ISBN: 88-07-01306-1

Little Misunderstandings of No Importance (Italian: Piccoli equivoci senza importanza) is a 1985 short story collection by the Italian writer Antonio Tabucchi.

== Reception ==
Brian Stonehill reviewed the book for the Los Angeles Times, and identified Tabucchi as a "neo-classical" writer, a label he also put on fellow Italians Primo Levi and Italo Calvino. Stonehill compared the book's balance between the serious and ironic to the works of Thomas Pynchon, and wrote: "Tabucchi reaps a bonus from the bogus; he dramatizes, convincingly, the limitations of imitation itself."

== See also ==
- 1985 in literature
- Italian literature
