= For Isabel =

2013 novella by Antonio Tabucchi

- Author: Antonio Tabucchi
- Original title: Per Isabel
- Translator: Elizabeth Harris
- Language: Italian
- Publisher: Feltrinelli
- Publication date: 9 October 2013
- Publication place: Italy
- English publication date: 5 September 2017
- Pages: 119
- ISBN: 9788807030635

For Isabel: A Mandala (Italian: Per Isabel. Un mandala) is a novella by the Italian writer Antonio Tabucchi, published posthumously by Feltrinelli in 2013.

== Plot ==
The Polish writer Tadeus Slowacki searches Lisbon after traces of Isabel, a young and enigmatic communist he once knew and who disappeared during the Estado Novo period. He meets and interviews various people who tell stories that give clues about who Isabel was and what may have happened to her. As the story goes on, the perspectives become increasingly metaphysical. The structure of the novel, with its layers of storytelling around a central character, is inspired by the mandala, a tool used in several religions to aid meditation.

== Reception ==
The Times Literary Supplement described the book as a "postmodern saturnalia of doubt and fractured self" and "not just a satisfactory rounding-off of Tabucchi's career, but a fantastic coda to it". Publishers Weekly wrote that the structure is similar to Dante Alighieri's Inferno and Akira Kurosawa's film Rashomon, describing it as "history recalled as though in a dream", written in "elegiac prose". Kirkus Reviews placed the book in the same tradition as Hermann Hesse's stories inspired by Eastern religions and wrote that although the themes merely are sketched out, there is "a satisfying richness to the whole".

The English translation by Elizabeth Harris received the 2018 Italian Prose in Translation Award from the American Literary Translators Association.
