= It's Getting Later All the Time =

2001 novel by Antonio Tabucchi

- Author: Antonio Tabucchi
- Original title: Si sta facendo sempre più tardi
- Translator: Alastair McEwen
- Language: Italian
- Publisher: Feltrinelli
- Publication date: 2001
- Publication place: Italy
- English publication date: 2006
- Pages: 228
- ISBN: 88-07-01590-0

It's Getting Later All the Time (Italian: Si sta facendo sempre più tardi) is a 2001 novel by the Italian writer Antonio Tabucchi. It has the form of an epistolary novel, and consists of letters from 17 men to former lovers, and a single letter with the response to all of them.

== Reception ==
Andrew Ervin wrote in The New York Times: "Taken linearly, these letters ... don't make any more sense than scenes in a Fellini movie. But, as with 8 [sic] or Amarcord, to look for logic is to miss the point. ... The subtle relationships between the letters turn out to be more thematic than literal, though they eventually come together in a brilliantly unexpected way."

== See also ==
- 2001 in literature
- Italian literature
