= Time Ages in a Hurry =

2009 short story collection by Antonio Tabucchi

- Author: Antonio Tabucchi
- Original title: Il tempo invecchia in fretta
- Translator: Antonio Romani; Martha Cooley
- Language: Italian
- Publisher: Feltrinelli
- Publication date: 25 September 2009
- Publication place: Italy
- English publication date: 4 April 2015
- Pages: 176
- ISBN: 9788807017841

Time Ages in a Hurry (Italian: Il tempo invecchia in fretta) is a 2009 short story collection by the Italian writer Antonio Tabucchi. The stories revolve around memory, meaning, national identity among Europeans and the circularity of time. The main characters are frequently at the end of their lives and have experiences from the 20th century that younger generations cannot relate to the same way as those who were there.
