= American Literary Translators Association =

American organization

The American Literary Translators Association (ALTA) is an organization in the United States dedicated to literary translation. ALTA promotes literary translation through its annual ALTA conference and year-round events structured around the creation of high-quality art. ALTA also administers awards to recognize excellence in translation and provides fellowships and mentorships to support emerging translators.

== History ==
The American Literary Translators Association (ALTA) was co-founded by Rainer Schulte and A. Leslie Willson in 1978 at The University of Texas at Dallas. ALTA's own scholarly journal, Translation Review, was also founded in 1978 and has been published regularly ever since. The ALTA Annual Conference has convened every year since 1978 in various locations throughout North America. From 1978 until 2014, ALTA was administratively housed at the University of Texas at Dallas. From 2014 to 2018, ALTA functioned as an independent, non-profit arts organization. In 2018, ALTA affiliated with College of Humanities at the University of Arizona, with ALTA relocating to UA in January 2019.

== Annual conference ==
The annual ALTA conference is a four-day gathering of professional literary translators, translation students and scholars, publishers of literature in translation, and others interested in the study, practice, and promotion of literary translation. Conference events include: panel presentations on a wide range of topics related to literary translation; roundtable discussions of issues relevant to literary translators, scholars, and publishers; bilingual readings of recently published translations or translations in progress (the Annual Alexis Levitin Bilingual Reading Series); and interactive workshops on translating specific texts. In addition, each conference features keynote presentations by invited speakers; readings by the ALTA Fellows; a book exhibit of recently published literature in translation; announcements of the winners of the annual ALTA book awards; a multilingual performance of translation recitation known as Declamación; and abundant opportunities for connections among translators, students, scholars, and publishers dedicated to fostering literary translation. In recent years, ALTA conference organizers have selected a conference theme to guide panel, workshop, and roundtable proposals in the direction of a broadly defined aspect of literary translation studies. Themes may address geographies, genres, literary elements, or other angles for approaching literary translation theory and practice.

=== Recent conferences ===
- November 8–11, 2023 in Tucson, Arizona: The Place of Translation, featuring a keynote by Sawako Nakayasu
- April–November 2022 (virtual year-round conference): Value(s)
- Oct 15–17 and Nov 11–13, 2021 (virtual and in-person in Tucson, Arizona, respectively): Inflection Points
- September 29–October 18, 2020 (virtual conference): "In Between"
- November 7–10, 2019 in Rochester, New York: "Sight and Sound", featuring a keynote by Peter Cook and Kenny Lerner, Flying Words Project
- October 31–November 3, 2018 in Bloomington, Indiana: ALTA41: Performance, Props, and Platforms, featuring a keynote by Caridad Svich
- October 5–8, 2017 in Minneapolis, Minnesota: "Reflections/Refractions," featuring keynotes by Lydia Davis and Tim Parks
- October 6–9, 2016 in Oakland, California: "Translation & Crossings," featuring a keynote by Don Mee Choi
- October 28–31, 2015 in Tucson, Arizona: "Translation & Traffic," featuring a keynote by Jerome Rothenberg
- November 12–15, 2014 in Milwaukee, Wisconsin: "Politics & Translation," featuring a keynote by Christopher Merrill

== Awards ==
=== National Translation Award ===
The National Translation Award (NTA) in Poetry and Prose is awarded annually for the book-length translations of fiction, poetry, drama, or creative non-fiction that, in the estimation of the panel of judges, represents the most valuable contribution to the field of literary translation each in poetry and prose published during the previous year. The original work may have been written in any language, but in order to be eligible for the NTA, the translation must be into English, and the book must have been published during the preceding calendar year. The prize awarded annually to the winning translator is worth $4,000 each in Poetry and Prose. In addition to honoring individual translators for their work, the NTA celebrates the craft of literary translation and strives to increase its visibility and broaden its market. The winner is announced each year at the ALTA annual conference.

For a complete list of past winners, see the main National Translation Award page.

=== Lucien Stryk Asian Translation Prize ===
In 2009, ALTA announced a $6,000 translation award named in honor of Lucien Stryk (1924-2013), acclaimed Zen poet and translator of Japanese and Chinese Zen poetry. The Lucien Stryk Prize is awarded annually to the translator of a book-length translation of Asian poetry, or source texts from Zen Buddhism published in the previous calendar year. Eligible translations may be from Chinese, Hindi, Japanese, Kannada, Korean, Sanskrit, Tamil, Thai, or Vietnamese into English. The Lucien Stryk Prize is intended for translations of contemporary works, but retranslations or first-time translations of older works may also be considered. The inaugural Lucien Stryk Prize was awarded in 2010. The winner is announced each year at the ALTA annual conference.

=== Italian Prose in Translation Award (IPTA) ===
The Italian Prose in Translation Award (IPTA), which was inaugurated in 2015, recognizes the importance of contemporary Italian prose (fiction and literary non-fiction) and promotes the translation of Italian works into English. This $5,000 prize will be awarded annually to a translator of a work of Italian prose (fiction or literary non-fiction) published in the previous calendar year. The winning translators and books are featured at the annual ALTA conference. Both translators and publishers are invited to submit titles. The winner is announced each year at the ALTA annual conference.

=== Spain-USA Foundation Translation Award (SUFTA) ===
The Spain-USA Foundation Translation Award (SUFTA), inaugurated in 2022, is offered by the American Literary Translators Association in conjunction with the Spain-USA Foundation. The award recognizes translations into English of literary prose works written originally by authors of Spanish (Spain) nationality published in the previous calendar year. The source language of the original text may be Spanish, Catalan, Basque, or Galician. The winner of the SUFTA is recognized at the annual ALTA conference and is awarded a $5,000 prize.

=== ALTA First Translation Prize ===
The ALTA First Translation Prize, inaugurated in 2024, recognizes the work of emerging literary translators and their editors. This annual prize is open to all genres, and awards one debut literary translation from any other language into English published in the previous calendar year. Translators based anywhere in the world and translations published anywhere in the world are eligible. The winner is recognized at the annual ALTA conference. They receive a cash prize of $3,000, with $2,000 bestowed to the translator and $1,000 to the editor.

=== ALTA Travel Fellowships ===
ALTA Travel Fellowships are awards of $1,000 each that are designed to help early-career translators cover the travel and lodging expenses associated with attending the ALTA Annual Conference. Each year, four to six winners are selected through a competitive application process, and ALTA Fellows give a public reading of their work at the conference. ALTA Fellows are typically first-time ALTA conference attendees. For the ALTA Travel Fellowships, an emerging translator is defined as someone who does not yet have a book-length work of translation published or under contract.

Each year, the Peter K. Jansen Memorial Travel Fellowship is preferentially awarded to one emerging translator of color or a translator working from an underrepresented diaspora or stateless language.

=== The Cliff Becker Book Prize in Translation ===
The Cliff Becker Book Prize in Translation was given to an unpublished book-length manuscript of poetry in translation and includes a $1,000 prize and publication by White Pine Press. The prize was suspended in 2019, and has reverted to the publisher White Pine Press.

== Publications ==
=== Translation Review ===
Translation Review, founded in 1978, is a twice-yearly print publication that highlights the theoretical, critical, and practical aspects surrounding the study, craft, and teaching of literary translation. Each issue of Translation Review may include interviews with translators, essays on the theory and practice of translation, articles on teaching literary works in translation and/or literary translation practice at colleges and universities, profiles of publishers and reports on emerging trends in the publishing of literary translations, and reviews of translations that focus specifically on translation-related aspects.

=== ALTA Guides to Literary Translation ===
The ALTA Guides to Literary Translation are brochures offering practical information, professional advice, and useful resources for literary translators at various points in their careers. As of 2014, there are five ALTA Guides to Literary Translation, each available as a PDF downloadable from the (archived) ALTA website:

- The Making of a Literary Translator introduces new and unpublished translators to the basics of translation and provides tips for developing translation skills.
- Breaking into Print guides translators through the process of selecting a text and an appropriate publication venue and discusses obstacles particular to publishing literary translations.
- The Proposal for a Book-Length Translation is an aid for navigating the proposal process, from initial query through to publication, with special information about how to research and/or obtain English-language publication rights.
- Promoting Your Literary Translation offers tools for promoting and marketing a published translation.
- The Literary Translator and the Internet is a basic guide to help literary translators make the most of the various modes and resources of the internet to in order to share and promote their craft.

=== ALTA Newsletter ===
ALTA's monthly e-newsletter provides information about upcoming conferences, grants, prizes, calls for papers, member news, and other items of interest.

== See also ==
- International Federation of Translators
- National Translation Award
- Lucien Stryk Asian Translation Prize
