= Letter from Casablanca =

1981 short story collection by Antonio Tabucchi

- Author: Antonio Tabucchi
- Original title: Il gioco del rovescio
- Translator: Janice M. Thresher
- Language: Italian
- Publisher: Il Saggiatore
- Publication date: 1981
- Publication place: Italy
- English publication date: 1986
- Pages: 136

Letter from Casablanca (Italian: Il gioco del rovescio) is a 1981 short story collection by the Italian writer Antonio Tabucchi.

== Contents ==
The first edition from Il Saggiatore contains the following stories.

- "Letter from Casablanca" ("Lettera da Casablanca")
- "Saturday Afternoons" ("I pomeriggi del sabato")
- "Heavenly Bliss" ("Paradiso celeste")
- "Dolores Ibarruri Sheds Bitter Tears" ("Dolores Iburrari versa lacrime amare")
- "The Little Gatsby" ("Il piccolo Gatsby")
- "Voices" ("Voci")
- "Theatre" ("Teatro")
- "The Backwards Game" ("Il gioco del rovescio")

The 1988 Italian edition from Feltrinelli Editore contains three additional stories. These stories are not in New Directions Publishing's English-language edition, published in 1986, but two—"The Cheshire Cat" and "Wanderlust"—were published in English in The Massachusetts Review in 2019.

- "The Cheshire Cat" ("Il gatto dello Cheshire")
- "Wanderlust" ("Vagabondaggio")
- "A Day in Olympia" ("Una giornata a Olimpia")
