= Zhang Zao =

Chinese poet (1962-2010)

- 张枣
- Born: December 29, 1962; Changsha, Hunan, China
- Died: March 8, 2010 (aged 47); Tübingen University Hospital (Universitätsklinikum Tübingen), Germany
- Education: Hunan Normal University (B.A.) Sichuan International Studies University (M.A.) University of Trier (Ph.D.)
- Notable work: Letters in Four Seasons (poetry collection), Mirror: Selected Poems (bilingual, translated by Fiona Sze-Lorrain)

Zhang Zao (simplified Chinese: 张枣; traditional Chinese: 張棗; pinyin: Zhāng Zǎo; December 29, 1962 – March 8, 2010) was one of the most important Chinese poets of the 20th century. He was considered one of the "Five Masters from Sichuan" (巴蜀五君子) in the 80s' Chinese poetry scene, along with other famous poets Bai Hua (simplified Chinese: 柏桦; traditional Chinese: 柏樺), Ouyang Jianghe (欧阳江河; 歐陽江河), Zhai Yongming (翟永明), and Zhong Ming (钟鸣; 鐘鳴). (Note: Some include Sun Wenbo (孙文波; 孫文波) in the list, while either excluding Zhong Ming or excluding Zhang Zao.) These poets are sometimes said to belong to the "Post-Hermeticist School" (后赫耳墨斯学派; 後赫耳墨斯學派; German: die Posthermetische Schule) of poetry.

Zhang's writing was sparse, having written for half a century but left behind only about 130 poems. He is arguably most famous for his debut poem in his early twenties, titled In the Mirror (《镜中》; 《鏡中》), with the much quoted lines, "once regrets come to mind, plum blossoms fall and cover the Southern Mountain" (只要想起一生中后悔的事 / 梅花便落满了南山). His style of poetry is described as "enigmatic", "complex" and "elegant", balancing between contemporary techniques and various aspects of classical Chinese literature aesthetics. Being able to speak English, German and French, as well as Russian and Latin to some degree of familiarity, He was also able to write with a certain sort of "multilingualist" property, drawing inspirations from other languages.

Zhang died of lung cancer on 8 March 2010 at the age of 48 at Tübingen University Hospital in Germany. The only collection of his works published pre-humously is Letters in Four Seasons (《春秋来信》), which contains 63 poems, selected by the poet himself. His first book in English translation (bilingual) is Mirror: Selected Poems by Zhang Zao, translated by writer, poet, translator Fiona Sze-Lorrain. Praised for her "incandescent translation" of Zhang Zao's Mirror, Sze-Lorrain is awarded the 2026 Lucien Stryk Asian Translation Prize.
