= Lucien Stryk Asian Translation Prize =

Zen Buddhism translation award

The Lucien Stryk Asian Translation Prize is a prize that recognizes the best translation into English of book-length texts of Asian poetry or Zen Buddhism. It was established by an anonymous donor in 2010, and is named for Lucien Stryk, the American Zen poet and translator.

The Lucien Stryk Asian Translation Prize is awarded at the same time as the National Translation Award (NTA) in Prose and Poetry, the Italian Prose in Translation Award (IPTA), and the Spain-USA Foundation Translation Award by the American Literary Translators Association (ALTA). These awards are announced and honored at the annual ALTA conference held each fall. The winner receives $6,000.

== About the prize ==
The prize is named after Lucien Stryk, an internationally acclaimed translator of Japanese and Chinese Zen poetry, Zen poet, and former professor of English at Northern Illinois University. Although primarily intended to recognize the translation of contemporary works, re-translations, or first-time translations of important older works, are also considered. Eligible works include book-length translations into English of Asian poetry, or source texts from Zen Buddhism, book-length translations from Hindi, Sanskrit, Tamil, Thai, Kannada, Vietnamese, Chinese, Japanese, and Korean into English. Submitted works must have been published in the previous calendar year.

== Winners of the prize ==
Year	Translator(s)	Book and Author	Language	Ref(s)
2026	Fiona Sze-Lorrain	Mirror by Zhang Zao	Chinese	
2025	Colin Leemarshall	Just Like by Lee Sumyeong	Korean	
2024	Li Wen-chi and Colin Bramwell	Decapitated Poetry	Chinese	
2023	Wong May	In the Same Light: 200 Poems for Our Century From the Migrants & Exiles of the Tang Dynasty	Chinese	
2022	Jae Kim	Cold Candies, by Lee Young-ju	Korean	
2021	Archana Venkatesan	Endless Song, translation of Thiruvaymozhi by Nammalvar	Tamil	
2020	Jake Levine, Soeun Seo, and Hedgie Choi	Hysteria by Kim Yideum	Korean	
2019	Don Mee Choi	Autobiography of Death by Kim Hyesoon	Korean	
2018	Bonnie Huie	Notes of a Crocodile by Qiu Miaojin	Chinese	
2017	Jennifer Feeley	Not Written Words by Xi Xi	Chinese	
2016	Sawako Nakayasu	The Collected Poems of Chika Sagawa by Chika Sagawa	Japanese	
2015	Eleanor Goodman	Something Crosses My Mind by Wang Xiaoni	Chinese	
2014	Jonathan Chaves	Every Rock a Universe: The Yellow Mountains and Chinese Travel Writing	Chinese	
2013	Lucas Klein	Notes on the Mosquito by Xi Chuan	Chinese	
2012	Don Mee Choi	All the Garbage of the World, Unite! by Kim Hyesoon	Korean	
2011	Charles Egan	Clouds Thick, Whereabouts Unknown: Poems by Zen Monks of China	Chinese	
2010	Red Pine (Bill Porter)	In Such Hard Times: The Poetry of Wei Ying-wu by Wei Ying-wu	Chinese	
