= H. E. Francis =

American scholar, academic and writer (1924–2024)

Herbert Edward Francis Jr. (January 11, 1924 – February 2, 2024) was an American scholar, academic and writer.

== Life and career ==
Herbert Edward Francis was born in Bristol, Rhode Island, on January 11, 1924. He studied at the University of Wisconsin and earned a master's degree from Brown University.

Francis was a professor of English at the University of Alabama in Huntsville. He travelled three times as a Fulbright professor to Argentina. An author in his own right, he published five collections of stories, some of which have been anthologized in the O. Henry, Best American, and Pushcart Prize volumes.

Francis turned 100 on January 11, 2024, and died weeks later, on February 2. At the time of his death he had been residing at a retirement home in Huntsville, Alabama.

The University of Alabama in Huntsville has named its national short fiction prize in his honor.

== Bibliography ==
=== Novels ===
- Goya, Are You With Me Now?. Savannah, GA: Frederic C. Beil, 1999.
- The Invisible Country. Savannah, GA: Frederic C. Beil, 2003.

=== Short fiction ===
- Toda la gente que nunca tuve. Buenos Aires: Burnichon, 1966. Translated by B. Ofelia Castillo.
- The Itinerary of Beggars. Iowa City, IA: University of Iowa Press, 1973.
- Naming Things: Stories. Urbana, IL: University of Illinois Press, 1980.
- A Disturbance of Gulls and Other Stories. New York: G. Braziller, 1983.
- The Sudden Trees and Other Stories. Savannah, GA: Frederic C. Beil, 1999.
- I'll Never Leave You: Stories. Kansas City, MO: BkMk Press, 2004.

=== Short non-fiction ===
- Animal World, by Antonio di Benedetto. Translated from Spanish by H. E. Francis, with an Afterword by Jorge García-Gómez. Grand Terrace, CA: Xenos Books. (Cover art by Peter Zokosky.)
- The Arrival of the Autumn in Constantinople, by es:Norberto Luis Romero. Translated from Spanish by H. E. Francis. Green Integer, CA: Book 176, 2010.
- Last Night of Carnival and Other Stories, by es:Norberto Luis Romero. Translated from Spanish by H. E. Francis. Leaping Dog Press, 2004. (Cover photograph by Philip Coblentz.)

=== Stories ===
Title	Publication	Collected in
"The Broken Bottle"	Prairie Schooner 25.3 (Fall 1951)	-
"Journey to Emily"	Prairie Schooner 26.3 (Fall 1952)	-
"The Darkness Is So Big"	Prairie Schooner 27.1 (Spring 1953)	-
"The Rock Garden"	Folio 19.1 (November 1953)	-
"An Anchor in the Land"	Prairie Schooner 27.4 (Winter 1953-54)	-
"The Journey of Annie Bliss"	Four Quarters 3.3 (April 1954)	-
"The Fence"	Prairie Schooner 28.3 (Fall 1954)	The Itinerary of Beggars
"The Kettle"	Arizona Quarterly 11.1 (Spring 1955)	-
"The Frog Lady"	Prairie Schooner 30.3 (Fall 1956)	The Itinerary of Beggars
"The Choice"	Four Quarters 6.1 (November 1956)	-
"The Indifferent Wind"	Four Quarters 6.3 (March 1957)	-
"The Mandrake Heart"	The Husk 37.1 (October 1957)	-
"Tom and Letty's World"	Carolina Quarterly 10.3 (Summer 1958)	-
"The Keepers"	Four Quarters 8.1 (November 1958)	-
"Vigil"	The Husk 38.2 (December 1958)	-
"The Singer and the Song"	Quixote 21 (Spring 1959)	-
"You'll Hear From Me Saturday"	Arizona Quarterly 15.3 (Autumn 1959)	-
"Something for a Rainy Day"	Four Quarters 9.1 (November 1959)	-
"Let the Weariness Go"	The Husk 39.1 (October 1959)	-
"The Wild Duck"	North Dakota Quarterly 28.1 (Winter 1960)	-
"Through a Certain Window"	Colorado Quarterly 8.4 (Spring 1960)	-
"Five Miles to December"	Southwest Review 45.4 (Autumn 1960)	-
"Dark Woman"	North Dakota Quarterly 28.4 (Autumn 1960)	-
"The Visitor"	Four Quarters 10.3 (March 1961)	-
"The Inheritance"	Four Quarters 11.2 (January 1962)	-
"As Fish, as Birds, as Grass"	The Minnesota Review 2.4 (Summer 1962)	-
"The Fallen"	University of Kansas City Review 28.4 (Summer 1962)	-
"The Game"	The Georgia Review 16.3 (Fall 1962)	The Itinerary of Beggars
"Sailor in Malaga"	North Dakota Quarterly 31.1/2 (Winter-Spring 1963)	-
"Don't Ask for Beauty Twice"	Transatlantic Review 15 (Spring 1964)	-
"Does He Treat You All Right?"	Four Quarters 14.4 (May 1965)	-
"The Deepest Chamber"	Four Quarters 15.3 (March 1966)	The Itinerary of Beggars
"One of the Boys"	Southwest Review 51.2 (Spring 1966)	The Itinerary of Beggars
"The Moment"	North American Review 251.3 (May 1966)	-
"All the People I Never Had"	Transatlantic Review 21 (Summer 1966)	The Itinerary of Beggars
"The Man Who Made People"	DeKalb Literary Arts Journal 1.3 (Spring 1967)	The Itinerary of Beggars
"Summer Is the Suffering Time Here"	North American Review 252.3 (May 1967)	-
"In Transit"	Arlington Quarterly 1.3 (Spring 1968)	-
"Going West"	Transatlantic Review 28 (Spring 1968)	The Itinerary of Beggars
"The Rate of Decomposition in a Cold Climate"	Southwest Review 53.3 (Summer 1968)	The Itinerary of Beggars
"3"	Virginia Quarterly Review 44.4 (Autumn 1968)	The Itinerary of Beggars
"Moments in the Definition of Space"	DeKalb Literary Arts Journal 3.1 (Fall 1968)	-
"The Listener"	University Review 35.1 (Autumn 1968)	-
"All the Carnivals in the World"	The Southern Review (Spring 1969)	The Itinerary of Beggars
"Don't Stay Away Too Long"	Southwest Review 54.4 (Autumn 1969)	The Itinerary of Beggars
"Her"	Georgia Review 23.3 (Fall 1969)	-
"Something Just Over the Edge of Everything"	Four Quarters 19.1 (November 1969)	-
"The Transfusion Man"	DeKalb Literary Arts Journal 4.2 (1969)	The Itinerary of Beggars
"Auction"	Arlington Quarterly 2.3 (Winter 1969-70)	-
"The Captain"	Transatlantic Review 36 (Summer 1970)	A Disturbance of Gulls
"Something of Martha"	DeKalb Literary Arts Journal (1970)	
"Where Was My Life Before I Died?"	Southwest Review 56.2 (Spring 1971)	The Itinerary of Beggars
"The Moment of Fish"	The Southern Review (Autumn 1971)	The Itinerary of Beggars
"The Shaping Sky"	Four Quarters 21.1 (November 1971)	-
"Sully"	Kansas Quarterly 4.1 (Winter 1971-72)	-
"The Long Darkness"	New Laurel Review 1.2 (Spring 1972)	-
"The Woman from Jujuy"	Southwest Review 57.3 (Summer 1972)	The Itinerary of Beggars
"Hours Beyond Dusk"	The Cimarron Review (1972)	-
"Passageways"	University of Windsor Review 8.2 (Spring 1973)	-
"Somewhere I Died"	Southwest Review 58.3 (Summer 1973)	-
"William Saroyan, Come Home"	Georgia Review 27.2 (Summer 1973)	-
"The Itinerary of Beggars"	Transatlantic Review 46/47 (Summer 1973)	The Itinerary of Beggars
"Contemplations of Ecstasy on the Day of My Suicide"	The Itinerary of Beggars (1973)	The Itinerary of Beggars
"Running"	The Itinerary of Beggars (1973)	The Itinerary of Beggars
"The Fire in My Face"	Southwest Review 58.4 (Autumn 1973)	-
"Beyond a Final Day"	Mississippi Review 2.2 (1973)	-
"In the Dust"	Wind 8 (1973)	-
"Tomorrow"	New Laurel Review 3.1/2 (1973)	-
"Parts"	Aphra 5.1 (Winter 1973-74)	-
"The Finer Cadence"	Confrontation 8 (Spring 1974)	-
"The Lessons of Particular Love"	Carleton Miscellany 14.2 (Spring-Summer 1974)	-
"The Electrician"	Four Quarters 23.4 (Summer 1974)	-
"Distances"	Black Warrior Review 1.1 (Fall 1974)	A Disturbance of Gulls
"This"	New Letters 41.2 (December 1974)	-
"The Long Way to Go"	DeKalb Literary Arts Journal 8.1 (1974)	-
"The Emptiest Corner"	Event 3.3 (1974)	-
"The Interior Landscape"	Georgia State University Review 1.1 (1974)	-
"A Chronicle of Love"	Kansas Quarterly 7.1/2 (Winter-Spring 1975)	Naming Things
"I Am Trying to Reach You, A Long Way Off, From This My Body Lying Beside You, So Please Listen"	Mississippi Review 4.1 (1975)	-
"Begin, Begin"	Georgia State University Review 1.2 (1975)	-
"Tracks"	West Coast Review 10.3 (February 1976)	-
"The Impossible"	Ontario Review 4 (Spring-Summer 1976)	-
"Thief"	Nimrod 20.2 (Spring-Summer 1976)	-
"Bones"	Red Cedar Review 10.2/3 (May 1976)	-
"Answers"	Boundary 2 5.1 (Autumn 1976)	-
"The Fever"	DeKalb Literary Arts Journal 9.3 (1976)	-
"Hurricane"	Mississippi Review 5.3 (1976)	-
"Out There"	Four Quarters 26.2 (Winter 1977)	The Sudden Trees
"Down"	Confrontation 14 (Spring-Summer 1977)	-
"A Thing of Beauty"	Aspen Anthology 4 (Fall 1977)	-
"Under"	Remington Review 5 (November 1977)	-
"Naming Things"	Virginia Quarterly Review 54.1 (Winter 1978)	Naming Things
"The History of a Man in Despair"	Kansas Quarterly 10.1 (Winter 1978)	A Disturbance of Gulls
"What Is the Color of Eternity?"	The Cimarron Review 42 (January 1978)	-
"The Alien Concept"	Chariton Review 4.1 (Spring 1978)	-
"The Advancement of Learning"	CutBank 10 (Spring-Summer 1978)	-
"Subject, Object, and the Nature of Love"	Quarterly West 6 (Spring-Summer 1978)	A Disturbance of Gulls
"Trial"	Southwest Review 63.3 (Summer 1978)	Naming Things
"November Afternoons"	The Sewanee Review 86.4 (October-December 1978)	Naming Things
"The Long Haul"	Nantucket Review 10 (1978)	-
"Two Lives"	Kansas Quarterly 11.1/2 (Winter-Spring 1979)	Naming Things
"Ballad of the Engineer Carl Feldmann"	Michigan Quarterly Review 18.2 (Spring 1979)	-
"Walls"	Quarterly West 9 (1979)	The Sudden Trees
"The Visitation"	West Branch 4 (1979)	-
"The Killing Station"	Mundus Artium 11.1 (1979)	-
"The Hoarders"	Naming Things (1980)	Naming Things
"Versions of the Body"	Naming Things (1980)	Naming Things
"The Woman—and the Man of It"	Naming Things (1980)	Naming Things
"Sitting"	Mississippi Review 10.1/2 (Spring-Summer 1981)	-
"A Disturbance of Gulls"	The Missouri Review 5.1 (Fall 1981)	A Disturbance of Gulls
"The Guitar"	Southwest Review 67.2 (Spring 1982)	-
"Suns"	Four Quarters 31.3 (Spring 1982)	-
"The Ledge"	Pulpsmith 2.2 (Summer 1982)	-
"On the Heights of Machu Picchu"	Greensboro Review 32 (Summer 1982)	The Sudden Trees
"The Cleaning Woman"	Crazyhorse 23 (Fall 1982)	-
"This Small Oblivion"	The Louisville Review 11 (1982)	-
"Evolving"	New Orleans Review 10.4 (Winter 1983)	-
"At Night the City"	The Literary Review 26.3 (Spring 1983)	-
"Son"	Kansas Quarterly 15.2 (Spring 1983)	A Disturbance of Gulls
"The Westerbergs"	New Mexico Humanities Review 6.2 (Summer 1983)	-
"Where's Tom?"	Virginia Quarterly Review 59.3 (Summer 1983)	-
"A Romance"	A Disturbance of Gulls (1983)	A Disturbance of Gulls
"A View of the Harbor"	A Disturbance of Gulls (1983)	A Disturbance of Gulls
"The Island"	Southwest Review 69.1 (Winter 1984)	-
"The Sudden Trees"	Prairie Schooner 58.1 (Spring 1984)	The Sudden Trees
"The Other"	The South Carolina Review 16.2 (Spring 1984)	-
"Falling"	The Antioch Review 42.4 (Autumn 1984)	-
"His Name"	Texas Review 5.3/4 (Fall-Winter 1984)	-
"Traveling"	Fiction Monthly 2.3 (November 1984)	-
"The Other Side of the Fire"	Montana Review 5 (1984)	The Sudden Trees
"Walking on Water"	Northwest Review 22.3 (1984)	-
"Why Do You Have to Go So Far to Be So Near?"	Mid-American Review 6.1 (Fall 1985)	-
"The Drawings"	Confrontation 30/31 (1985)	-
"Carnival"	The Literary Review 29.2 (Winter 1986)	-
"In the Basement"	The Antigonish Review 66/67 (Summer-Autumn 1986)	-
"Sin-Lengua (from Death in Argentina)"	Crazyhorse 31 (1986)	-
"A Daughter's Life"	Gargoyle 30/31 (November 1986)	-
"Crossing the Sound"	Nantucket Review 26 (1986)	-
"Joshua"	The Sewanee Review 95.2 (Spring 1987)	The Sudden Trees
"Among the Exiles"	Kansas Quarterly 19.3 (Summer 1987)	-
"You, Felipe"	Quarterly West 25 (Summer 1987)	-
"Plan of the City"	Event 16.3 (1987)	-
"Normal Experience"	The Kenyon Review 10.3 (Summer 1988)	-
"Random"	Indiana Review 12.2 (1989)	-
"A Flight of Bones"	Missouri Review 12.1 (1989)	-
"Interval"	Short Story Review 6.2 (1989)	-
"Hog Island" aka "The One Summer of Our Lives"	The Alaska Quarterly Review 9.1/2 (Fall-Winter 1990)	-
"The Men"	Beloit Fiction Journal 5.2 (Spring 1990)	-
"Mr. Balzano"	Southern Review 27.2 (Spring 1991)	The Sudden Trees
"Hoarding Mountains"	Sycamore Review 4.2 (Summer 1992)	-
"Fathers"	The Literary Review 35.2 (1992)	-
"The Geography of Fear"	Ontario Review 36 (1992)	-
"A Brother's Passion"	Beloit Fiction Journal 8.2 (Spring 1993)	-
"Wanda and Rival"	Kansas Quarterly 25.3/4 (Spring 1993)	-
"The Collection Man"	Boulevard 25/26 (Spring 1994)	-
"All Summer Long"	The Missouri Review 17.2 (Fall 1994)	-
"Prologue to a Life of Storywriting"	Elk River Review 3.1 (1994)	-
"Ignacio"	Carolina Quarterly 47.2 (Winter 1995)	-
"Lib"	Mānoa 7.1 (Summer 1995)	I'll Never Leave You
"Skin"	The James White Review 12.3 (Fall 1995)	-
"Going Under"	Alabama Bound: Contemporary Stories of a State (1995)	-
"The Boulders"	Five Fingers Review 34.3 (1995)	I'll Never Leave You
"The Children"	Prairie Schooner 70.1 (Spring 1996)	-
"My Life and Death, and Yours"	Santa Barbara Review 4.2 (Summer 1996)	-
"The Winter Guest"	Alaska Quarterly Review 15.1/2 (Fall-Winter 1996)	I'll Never Leave You
"Running the Bulls"	Sonora Review 32 (Fall-Winter 1996)	-
"A Deep, Black Joy"	Kinesis 5.4 (1996)	-
"A Little Thing"	South Dakota Quarterly 34.3 (1996)	-
"Underground Music"	The Missouri Review 20.3 (Winter 1997)	-
"Talking to Spiders"	Willow Springs 39 (January 1997)	-
"Witness"	Mid-American Review 17.2 (Spring 1997)	-
"Thermal Belt"	Chariton Review 23.1 (Spring 1997)	-
"The Kitchen Window"	Quarterly West 44 (Spring-Summer 1997)	-
"The Battered Shore"	Southwest Review 82.3 (Summer 1997)	I'll Never Leave You
"Minor Matters"	Cimarron Review 120 (July 1997)	I'll Never Leave You
"Natural Music"	American Short Fiction 27 (Fall 1997)	-
"The Walls of Avila"	CrossConnect 3.2 (October 1997)	-
"The End House"	Arkansas Review 28.3 (December 1997)	-
"In the Metro"	Witness 11.1 (1997)	-
"Rides"	Kinesis 6.1 (1997)	-
"Fog"	Press 6 (1997)	-
"Watching Marie"	Bridge 7.1 (1998)	I'll Never Leave You
"The Playground"	Shenandoah 49.1 (Spring 1999)	I'll Never Leave You
"The Healing of the Body"	The Sudden Trees (1999)	The Sudden Trees
"The Private Lives of Children"	Ontario Review 51 (Fall-Winter 1999-2000)	I'll Never Leave You
"The Loves of Joaquin (A Diversion)"	Harrington Gay Men's Fiction Quarterly 2.1 (2000)	-
"On Painting Women"	Thin Air 5.1 (2000)	-
"To Timimoun"	Harrington Gay Men's Fiction Quarterly 3.4 (2001)	-
"Anchorwoman"	Five Fingers Review 19 (2001)	-
"Hound"	The Literary Review (2001)	-
"Senor Alvero"	The Literary Review 46.1 (Fall 2002)	-
"Love, and After"	Iron Horse Literary Review 4.1 (Fall 2002)	-
"This, My Body"	Witness 16.1 (2002)	-
"A Gathering of Women"	Chariton Review 29.1 (2003)	-
"I'll Never Leave You"	Harrington Gay Men's Fiction Quarterly 6.3 (2004)	I'll Never Leave You
"Waiting for the Man"	The Literary Review 49.4 (Summer 2006)	-
"About Love"	Southwest Review 95.4 (2010)	-
"The Way Back"	The Literary Review 57.1 (Winter 2014)	-
"At the San Millan"	Cottonwood 73 (Spring 2017)	-
"True Light"	Antioch Review 77.4 (Fall 2019)	-
"Put Yourself in My Hands"	Confrontation (Spring 2020)	-
