= Requiem: A Hallucination =

1991 novel by Antonio Tabucchi

- First edition (Portuguese)
- Author: Antonio Tabucchi
- Original title: Requiem: uma alucinação
- Translator: Margaret Jull Costa
- Cover artist: Hieronymus Bosch, detail from Triptych of the Temptation of St. Anthony - 1501
- Language: Portuguese
- Publisher: Quetzal Editores
- Publication date: 1991
- Publication place: Portugal
- English publication date: 1994
- Pages: 127
- ISBN: 972-564-117-5

Requiem: A Hallucination (Portuguese: Requiem: uma alucinação) is a 1991 novel by the Italian writer Antonio Tabucchi. Set in Lisbon, the narrative centres on an Italian author who meets the spirit of a dead Portuguese poet, never named but strongly indicated to be Fernando Pessoa. Tabucchi wrote the book in Portuguese. Alain Tanner directed a 1998 film adaptation, also called Requiem.

== Publication ==
The book was first published in Portugal in 1991 through Quetzal Editores. An Italian translation was published through Feltrinelli the year after. New Directions Publishing released an English translation by Margaret Jull Costa from the original Portuguese in 1994.

== Reception ==
The book was reviewed in Publishers Weekly: "Chance encounters, ambivalent symbols, black humor and nonrational events pervade the narrative as Tabucchi's alter-ego meets his father as a young sailor; the ghost of Isabel, a former lover who committed suicide; Tadeus, who may have been the father of the child Isabel was carrying; and other colorful figures, alive and dead. Finally, Tabucchi meets his revered poet friend to discuss Kafka, postmodernism and the future of literature. Winner of the 1991 Italian PEN Prize, this playful bagatelle, translated from the original Portuguese, is partly an homage to Portuguese culture, partly a mellow autobiographical fantasy."

== See also ==
- 1991 in literature
- Italian literature
