= Animal World (short story collection) =

- Author: Antonio di Benedetto
- Original title: Mundo animal
- Language: Spanish
- Genre: Short stories
- Publication date: 1953
- Publication place: Argentina
- Media type: Print

Animal World (Spanish original title: Mundo animal, 1953) is a collection of short stories written by Antonio di Benedetto, with hallucinatory animal transformations by the internationally acknowledged Argentine master.

== Summary ==
Written in conversational and even intentionally awkward language, they present a confused and troubled narrator, who, tormented by mysterious gnawings of guilt, becomes involved in some obscure way with an animal or whole group of animals. They invade his soul, drive him to rage or deliver him from his obsession. Often the story hinges on a pun, a distorted folktale, or an illogical association. While not spectacular in itself, each story adds to the preceding to create a growing sense of doom. Thus story by story the reader becomes ensnared in a horrifying, hallucinatory realm of associations.

== Editions ==
- Translated from Spanish by H. E. Francis, with an Afterword by Jorge García-Gómez. Grand Terrace, CA: Xenos Books. ISBN 978-1-879378-17-9 (paper), 138 p. [With cover art by Peter Zokosky.]
