= The Flying Creatures of Fra Angelico =

1987 short story collection by Antonio Tabucchi

- 1987 edition
- Author: Antonio Tabucchi
- Original title: I volatili del Beato Angelico
- Translator: Tim Parks
- Language: Italian
- Publisher: Sellerio Editore
- Publication date: 1987
- Publication place: Italy
- English publication date: 1991
- Pages: 83
- ISBN: 8838904413

The Flying Creatures of Fra Angelico (Italian: I volatili del Beato Angelico) is a 1987 short story collection by the Italian writer Antonio Tabucchi.

== Contents ==
The stories focus on creating images, often with surreal elements, and sometimes take form as fragments and sketches.

- "The Flying Creatures of Fra Angelico"
- "Past Composed: Three Letters"
  - I. "Letter from Dom Sebastião de Avis, King of Portugal, to Francisco Goya, painter"
  - II. "Letter from Mademoiselle Lenormand, fortune-teller, to Dolores Ibarruri, revolutionary"
  - II. "Letter from Valypso, a nymph, to Odysseus, King of Ithaca"
- "The Passion of Dom Pedro"
- "Message from the Shadows"
- "'The phrase that follows this is false: the phrase that precedes this is true'"
- "The Battle of San Romano"
- "Story of a Non-Existent Story"
- "The Translation"
- "Happy People"
- "The Archives of Macao"
- "Last Invitation"

== Publication ==
Sellerio Editore published the book in Italian in 1987. The English translation by Tim Parks was first published in 1991 in an omnibus volume together with Tabucchi's short story collections Vanishing Point and The Woman of Porto Pim. The Flying Creatures of Fra Angelico was published separately in 2012.

== Reception ==
In 2012, Alan Cheuse of NPR said that The Flying Creatures of Fra Angelico is written in a way that "creates a deep, near-profound and sometimes heart-wrenching nostalgia", calling it "wonderfully thought-provoking and beautiful".
