= Lee Sumyeong =

South Korean poet, critic, and translator

- Born: 1965 (age 60–61); Seoul
- Occupations: Poet, Critic

Korean name
- Hangul: 이수명
- RR: I Sumyeong
- MR: I Sumyŏng

Lee Sumyeong (Korean: 이수명, born 1965) is a South Korean poet, critic, and translator. Her poetic style has reputation of being unfamiliar and difficult, but some also comment that she is a classicist as well as a modernist. Critic Cho Kangsuk has said that she has already "laid out a completed road", upon the genealogy of modernism and that "many younger poets are working on that road", emphasizing the fact that her poetry was pioneering in how she overturned common usage of words and stereotypes.

== Life ==
Born and raised in Seoul, Lee Sumyeong studied Korean language and literature at Seoul National University. Her debut publication of 5 poems in the literary journal Jakkasegye (Writer's World) won the journal's 1994 New Writer Award. In 2007, she received her doctorate from Chung-Ang University with a study of Kim Ku-yong, a major literary influence. Her monograph is one of the pioneering works about the hitherto rarely discussed poet.

She is known as one of the poets that represents Korea's modernism since the 1990s. She has published many essays on poetry, critical essay collections, and research papers on modernism. She has won the 2nd Park In-Hwan Literary Award in 2001, the 12th Hyeondaesi (Contemporary Poetics) Award in 2011, the 12th Nojak Literary Prize in 2012, and the 7th Yi Sang Poetry Award in 2014. She participate in the 2016 Seoul International Writer's Festival (SIWF). She has won the Kim Chunsu Poetry Award in 2018 and the Cheongma Literary Award in 2022.

Lee Sumyeong's first collection in English, Just Like, translated by Colin Leemarshall, is published in 2024. This collection won Lucien Stryk Asian Translation Prize from American Literary Translators Association (ALTA) in 2025.

== Writing ==
Lee Sumyeong has been strongly influenced by Korean avant-garde poets, including Yi Sang, Kim Ku-yong, and Kim Jongsam, as well as by Western poets like Wallace Stevens, Paul Celan, and René Char. Renowned for the "impenetrability" and the deceptive "tidy-style," Lee Sumyeong's works, some critics claim, may be interpreted as the search for a radical way to "let things, not humans, speak".

== Critical appraisal ==
Critic Park Sang-su said, Lee Sumyeong was a poet who "started from the position of reflecting on the violence of lyric poetry and poetic subjects that have become a constituent custom" .

== Works ==
=== Collections of poems ===
Saeroun odoki georireul mewotda (새로운 오독이 거리를 메웠다 New Misreading Filled the Streets), Segyesa, 1995.

Waegarineun waegari nolireul handa (왜가리는 왜가리 놀이를 한다, Herons Play Heron's Play), Segyesa, 1998.

Bulgeun damjangui keobeu (붉은 담장의 커브 Curve of the Red Wall), Minumsa, 2001

Goyangi bidioreul boneun goyangi (고양이 비디오를 보는 고양이 Cat Watching Cat Video), Moonji Publishing, 2004.

Eonjaena neomu maneun bideul (언제나 너무 많은 비들 Always Too Many Rains), Moonji Publishing, 2011.

Machi (마치 Just Like), Moonji Publishing, 2014

Mullyuchanggo (물류창고 Warehouse), Moonji Publishing, 2018

Doshigaseu (도시가스 Gas Lines), Moonji Publishing, 2022

Just Like, translated & introduced by Colin Leemarshall, Black Ocean, 2024 - English translation of Machi.

Jeongoui chongal (정오의 총알 A Bullet at Noon), Moonji Publishing, 2026

=== Prose works ===
Kim Gu-yonggwa Hanguk Hyeondaesi (김구용과 한국 현대시 Kim Gu-yong and Modern Korean Poetry), Korean Studies Information, 2008. – monograph

Hoengdan (횡단 Crossing), Munye Joongang, 2011. – essays on poetics

Gongseubui sidae (공습의 시대 Era of the Air Raid), Munhakdongne, 2016. – an idiosyncratic history of Korean poetry in 1990s

Pyomyeonui sihak (표면의 시학 The Poetics of Surface), Nanda, 2018. – essays on poetics

Naneun chilseongsyupeoreul boattda (나는 칠성슈퍼를 보았다 I Saw Chilsung Supermarket), Achimdal, 2022. – essays

Naega eopneun sseugi (내가 없는 쓰기 Writing without Me), Nanda, 2023. – diary of 2022

Jeongjeoggw soeum (정적과 소음 Quietude and Noise), Nanda, 2024. – diary of 2023

Heuin keobui hyushik (흰 컵의 휴식 A Rest of White Cup), Nanda, 2025. – diary of 2024

=== Translations ===
Duncan Heath, Introducing Romanticism, Gimm-Young Publishers, 2002.

Darian Leader, Introducing Lacan, Gimm-Young Publishers, 2002.

Jeff Collins, Introducing Derrida, Gimm-Young Publishers, 2003.

David Norris, Introducing Joyce, Gimm-Young Publishers, 2006.

== Awards ==
1994 Jakkasegye (Writer's World) New Writer Award.

2001 Park In-Hwan Literary Award.

2011 Hyeondaesi (Contemporary Poetics) Award.

2012 Nojak Literary Prize.

2014 Yi Sang Poetry Award.

2018 Kim Chunsu Poetry Award.

2022 Cheongma Literary Award.

2025 Lucien Stryk Asian Translation Prize (recipient. Colin Leemarshall).
