= Piazza d'Italia (novel) =

1975 novel by Antonio Tabucchi

- Author: Antonio Tabucchi
- Language: Italian
- Genre: picaresque novel
- Publisher: Bompiani
- Publication date: 1975
- Publication place: Italy
- Pages: 134

Piazza d'Italia is the 1975 debut novel of the Italian writer Antonio Tabucchi. It is a short picaresque novel that spans from the Italian unification to the fascist era and follows Volturno Banarchist, a rebel and occasional clairvoyant. It was first published by Bompiani.

The scholar Rocco Capozzi describes Banarchist as the model for the type of socially conscious protagonist that would recur throughout Tabucchi's literary career.
