= Lucien Stryk =

American poet (1924–2013)

Lucien Stryk (April 7, 1924 – January 24, 2013) was an American poet, translator of Buddhist literature and Zen poetry, and former English professor at Northern Illinois University (NIU).

== Biography ==
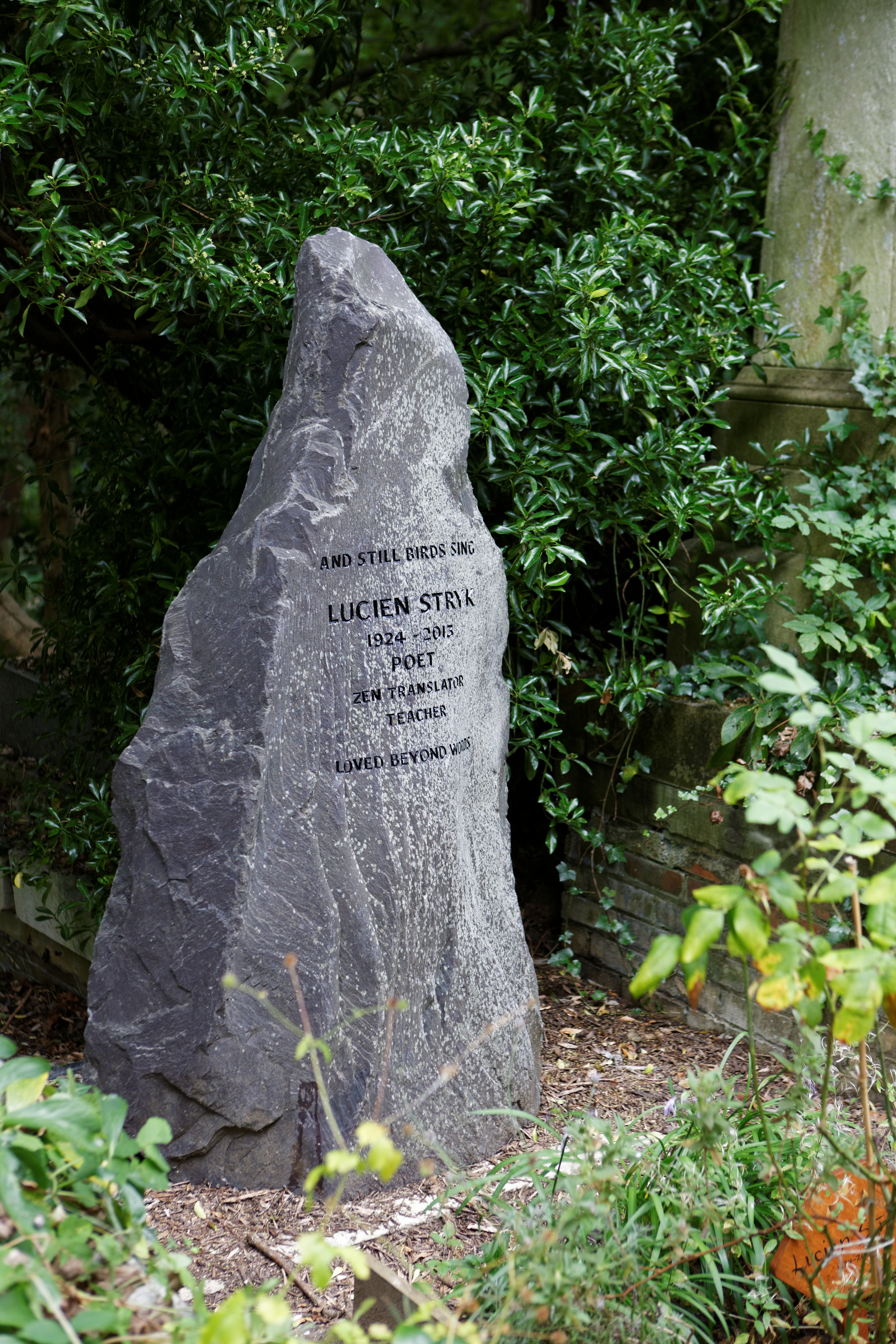
Stryk's grave in Highgate Cemetery.

Stryk was born in Poland on April 7, 1924, and moved to Chicago aged four, where he spent the remainder of his childhood. He later served as a Forward Observer during World War II in the Pacific. On his return, he studied at Indiana University, and afterwards at the Sorbonne in Paris, London University, and the University of Iowa Writing Program.

From 1958 until his retirement in 1991 Lucien Stryk served on the Northern Illinois University English department faculty. In 1991 NIU awarded him an honorary doctorate for his accomplishments. He also has taught at universities in Japan, and was a Fulbright lecturer both in Japan and in Iran.

Stryk wrote or edited more than two dozen books. These include his own poetry, poetry anthologies and numerous translations of Chinese and Japanese Zen poetry, both classical and contemporary. He also recorded much of his work on Folkways Records. His poetry was influenced by Walt Whitman, Paul Éluard, and Basho, and translated into Japanese, Chinese, French, Spanish, Swedish and Italian.

Lucien Stryk twice received the Illinois Arts Council Artist's Grant, and twice the Illinois Arts Council Literary Award. He edited two seminal volumes of Midwestern poetry, Heartland I and Heartland II, which put the Midwest on the literary map. Lucien's sequential portrait of the city, "A Sheaf for Chicago," was first published in Chicago as part of a "Best New Poem" competition shared with John Berryman and Hayden Carruth. That same poem was recently reprinted in the anthology, City of the Big Shoulders: Poems about Chicago (University of Iowa Press, 2012).

In 2009, the American Literary Translators Association (ALTA) announced the inaugural Lucien Stryk Asian Translation Prizes.

Lucien Stryk died January 24, 2013, at St. John's Hospice in London. He is buried in Highgate Cemetery. He was survived by his wife, Helen; sister, Leonora Krimen; son, Dan Stryk and his wife Suzanne; daughter, Lydia Stryk.

== Poetry ==
- Taproot, Fantasy Press, 1953
- The Trespasser, Fantasy Press, 1956
- Notes for a Guidebook, (The New Poetry Series) AMS Press
- Heartland: Poets of the Midwest, (editor) Northern Illinois University Press, 1967
- The Pit and Other Poems, Swallow Press, 1969
- Awakening, Swallow Press, 1973
- Heartland II: Poets of the Midwest, (editor) Northern Illinois University Press, 1975
- Selected Poems, Swallow Press, 1976
- The Duckpond, Omphalos Press, 1978
- Prairie voices: a collection of Illinois poets, Spoon River Poetry Press, 1980, ISBN 978-0-933180-21-5
- Willows, Embers Handpress, 1983
- Collected Poems, 1958-1983, Swallow Press, 1984
- Bells of Lombardy, Northern Illinois University Press, 1986, ISBN 978-0-87580-127-8
- Of Pen & Ink & Paper Scraps, Swallow Press/Ohio University Press, 1989
- And Still Birds Sing : New & Collected Poems, Swallow Press/Ohio University Press, 1998, ISBN 978-0-8040-1005-4
- Where We Are: Selected Poems and Translations, Skoob Books, 1997

== Selected non-fiction and works of translation ==
- Zen: Poems, Prayers, Sermons, Anecdotes, Interviews, Doubleday and Co, 1963, reissue: Ohio University Press, 1981
- Lucien Stryk, ed. (1968). World of the Buddha: An Introduction to Buddhist Literature. Doubleday. ISBN 978-0-8021-3095-2. (reprint Grove Press, 1994, ISBN 978-0-8021-3095-2)
- Afterimages: Zen Poems of Shinkichi Takahashi, Swallow Press, 1970
- Taigan Takayama (1987). Lucien Stryk; Takashi Ikemoto (eds.). Zen poems of China & Japan: the Crane's bill. Translators Lucien Stryk, Takashi Ikemoto. Grove Press. ISBN 978-0-8021-3019-8.
- The Duckweed Way: Haiku of Issa, Translators Lucien Stryk, Takashi Ikemoto, Rook Press, 1977
- Lucien Stryk, Takashi Ikemoto, ed. (1987). The Penguin Book of Zen Poetry. Translators Lucien Stryk, Takashi Ikemoto. Penguin Books. ISBN 978-0-14-058599-5.
- Encounter with Zen: Writings on Poetry and Zen, Swallow Press, 1981
- Bashō Matsuo (1985). Lucien Stryk (ed.). On love and barley: haiku of Basho. Translated by Lucien Stryk. University of Hawaii Press. ISBN 978-0-8248-1012-2.
- On Love and Barley: Haiku of Basho, Penguin, 1985
- Shinkichi Takahashi (2000). Lucien Stryk (ed.). Triumph of the Sparrow: Zen Poems of Shinkichi Takahashi. Translated by Lucien Stryk; Takashi Ikemoto. Grove Press. ISBN 978-0-8021-3736-4.
- Bird of time: Haiku of Basho
- The Dumpling Field: Haiku of Issa, Translator Lucien Stryk, Ohio University Press, 1991
- Shinkichi Takahashi (2000). Lucien Stryk (ed.). Triumph of the Sparrow: Zen Poems of Shinkichi Takahashi. Translators Lucien Stryk, Takashi Ikemoto. Grove Press. ISBN 978-0-8021-3736-4.
- Lucien Stryk (ed) Cage Of Fireflies : Modern Japanese Haiku, Swallow Press, 1993, ISBN 978-0-8040-0976-8
- The Awakened Self: Encounters With Zen, Kodansha International, 1995, ISBN 978-1-56836-046-1
- Lucien Stryk; Takashi Ikemoto, eds. (1995). Zen poetry: let the spring breeze enter. Translated by Lucien Stryk; Takashi Ikemoto. Grove Press. ISBN 978-0-8021-3407-3.

== About Stryk ==
- Zen, Poetry, the Art of Lucien Stryk. Susan Azar Porterfield, ed. Ohio University Press, 1993.
- Interview with Stryk 'Poets & Writers' July/August 1995.
- Susan Azar Porterfield, "The War Poetry of Lucien Stryk." Journal of the Midwest Modern Language Association Winter 2001
- Susan Azar Porterfield, "Thomas James and Lucien Stryk: "and you/My first live poet." The Writer's Chronicle Oct. 2013
