= M. M. De Voe =

American novelist

- Born: Milda Motekaitis
- Education: College of Notre Dame of Maryland (BA); Columbia University (MFA)
- Occupation: Author
- Children: 2
- Website: www.mmdevoe.com

M. M. De Voe (born Milda Motekaitis) is an American author.

== Early life and education ==
Her parents were born in Lithuania and live in Texas.

De Voe received her Master of Fine Arts from the creative writing program at Columbia University in May 2001 and her Bachelor of Arts from the College of Notre Dame of Maryland, magna cum laude, in 1990.

== Writing ==
M. M. De Voe is a fiction writer who has won awards and published short fiction in nearly every genre. She has been a writing fellow at Columbia University. She won a fellowship to the 2008 St. Petersburg Summer Literary Seminars. The manuscript of her Columbia thesis won an honorable mention in Barbara Kingsolver's Bellwether Prize as well as an Arch and Bruce Brown Foundation Grant for gay-positive historical fiction.

De Voe was a member of the inaugural Lithuanian Writers of the Diaspora Forum, held in Vilnius, Lithuania in 2019.

De Voe's Book & Baby: The Complete Guide to Managing Chaos and Becoming a Wildly Successful Writer-parent (2021) is part-memoir, part writing advice.

She has published a book of short stories, A Flash of Darkness (2023).

== Pen Parentis ==
In 2009, De Voe set up Pen Parentis, a literary non-profit organization providing resources to authors who are also parents. The organization hosts an annual writing fellowship for new parents and runs a reading series in Manhattan called the Pen Parentis Literary Salons.

== Acting and voicework ==
A member of both Equity and SAG-AFTRA, under the name Milda DeVoe, she appeared in many plays in New York City, including The Marriage of Bette and Boo, A Lie of the Mind, Baby with the Bathwater and The Heidi Chronicles (as the title role). She does voiceover work in both Lithuanian and English, and is one of the Lithuanian voices of OnStar. She wrote the book for a musical, R/evolution, which was put on at the Robert Moss Theater in 2015.

== Personal life ==
De Vos lives in the Financial District, Manhattan, New York City, with her husband and two children.
