= Piazza d'Italia, Sassari =

Plaza in Sassari, Italy

Coordinates: 40°43′30.98″N 8°33′50.24″E

Piazza d'Italia
- City square
- Design: Eugenio Sironi, Giovanni Borgnini
- Constructed: 1872
- Dimensions: 100 by 100 metres (330 ft × 330 ft)
- Surface: Cobblestone, granite
- Location: Sassari, Italy
- Interactive map of Piazza d'Italia

Piazza d'Italia is a city square in Sassari, Italy.

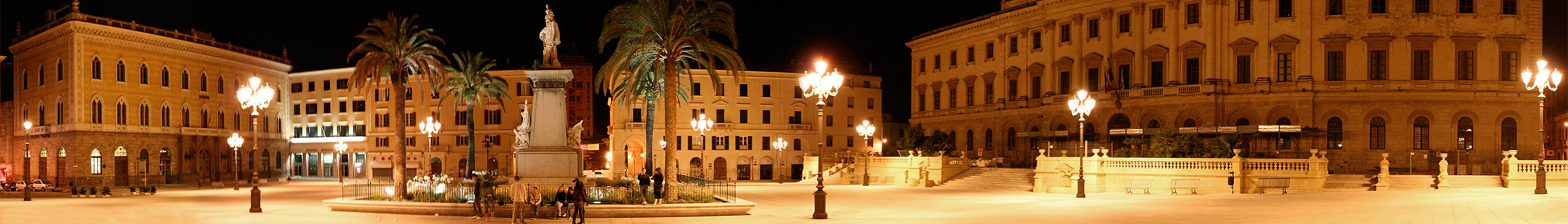
Piazza d'Italia

== Buildings around the square ==
- Palazzo della Provincia, Sassari
- Palazzo Giordano
