= Zama (novel) =

Novel

- Cover to the 2016 English translation
- Author: Antonio di Benedetto
- Translator: Esther Allen
- Language: Spanish
- Genre: Historical novel, psychological novel
- Published: 1956 (Doble P)
- Publication place: Argentina
- English publication date: 2016 (New York Review Books)
- Pages: 201 (NYRB)
- ISBN: 987-9396-47-2
- OCLC: 858896468

Zama is a 1956 novel by Argentine writer Antonio di Benedetto. Existential in nature, the plot centers around the eponymous Don Diego de Zama, a minor official of the colonial Spanish Empire stationed in remote Paraguay during the late 18th century, and his attempts to receive a long-awaited promotion and transfer to Buenos Aires in the face of personal and professional stagnation. Di Benedetto drew heavily from Russian writer Fyodor Dostoevsky. These existential themes of inward and outward stasis because of circumstance drive the novel's narrative as being constantly in motion yet never changing. Together with two of his other novels, El silenciero (1964) and Los suicidas (1969), Zama has been published as part of Benedetto's informal La trilogía de la espera (The Trilogy of Waiting). The novel is considered by various critics to be a major work of Argentine literature.

== Plot summary ==
Don Diego de Zama is a servant to the Spanish crown in remote Paraguay. Separated from his wife and children, he continuously schemes for professional advancement as he struggles with his mental and emotional state as isolation, bureaucratic setbacks, and self-destructive choices begin to compound themselves in his life. The novel is divided chronologically into three sections: 1790, 1794, and 1799, which focus on, respectively, Zama's sexual, financial, and existential conflicts.

== Reception ==
Obscure on its original release and unknown to English readers before its translation in 2016, Zama has since been considered by various critics to be a major work of Argentine literature. Roberto Bolaño used Antonio di Benedetto and Zama as the basis of his short story "Sensini" from the collection Last Evenings on Earth, about fictional writer Luis Antonio Sensini and his novel Ugarte, likewise about an 18th-century colonial bureaucrat, described as having been written with "neurosurgical precision." The 2016 translation in English was lauded in The New Yorker by novelist Benjamin Kunkel as "a neglected South American masterpiece" ("The belated arrival of Zama in the United States raises an admittedly hyperbolic question: Can it be that the Great American Novel was written by an Argentinean? It’s hard, anyway, to think of a superior novel about the bloody life of the frontier."), and by Nobel Prize in Literature laureate J. M. Coetzee in The New York Review of Books: "Zama remains the most attractive of Di Benedetto's books, if only because of the crazy energy of Zama himself, which is vividly conveyed in Esther Allen’s excellent translation."

Esther Allen's translation into English won the 2017 National Translation Award (USA).

== Adaptation ==
In 2017 Zama was adapted into a feature film by Argentine director Lucrecia Martel.
