= Tim Parks =

British writer (born 1954)

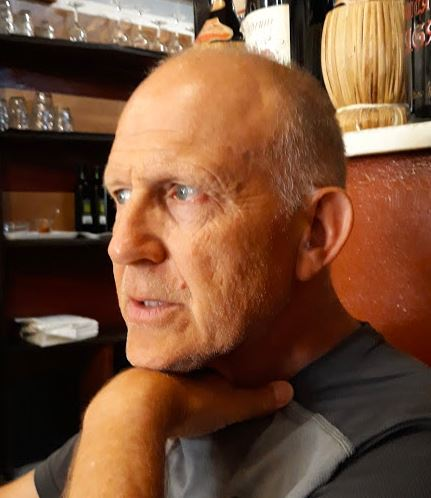
- Parks in Arezzo in 2019
- Born: Timothy Harold Parks; 19 December 1954 (age 71); Manchester, England, UK
- Education: Downing College, Cambridge; Harvard University
- Spouse(s): Rita Baldassarre (m. 1979; div. 2017) Eleonora Gallitelli (m. 2020)
- Children: 3
- Writing career
- Period: 1985–present
- Notable works: Europa, Destiny, Teach Us to Sit Still, In Extremis
- Website: Official website

Timothy Harold Parks (born 19 December 1954) is a British novelist who has lived in Italy since 1981. He is also an author of nonfiction, a translator from Italian to English, and a professor of literature.

== Early life and academic career ==
Parks was born in Manchester, the son of Harold Parks, an Anglican vicar and missionary, and his wife Joan. He grew up in Finchley, and was educated at Westminster City School and Downing College, Cambridge, where he read English. Following graduation in 1977 he spent a further period at Harvard University studying for a doctorate, which he did not complete. During his time in the United States, he wrote introductions for the dramatisations of novels on behalf of the Boston public radio station WGBH. Upon returning to Europe, Parks was employed initially as a marketing executive for a translation company before working as a freelance translator and teacher in Verona. From 1985 to 1992 he was a lecturer at the University of Verona. He was made a Visiting Lecturer at the Istituto Universitario di Lingue Moderne in Milan (now known as IULM University) in 1992, and from 2005 to 2019 was an Associate Professor there.

== Writing ==
Parks is the author of twenty novels (notably Europa, which was shortlisted for the Booker Prize in 1997). His first novel, Tongues of Flame, won both the Betty Trask Award and Somerset Maugham Award in 1986. In the same year, Parks was awarded the Mail on Sunday/John Llewellyn Rhys Prize for Loving Roger. Other highly praised titles were Shear, Destiny, Judge Savage, Cleaver, and In Extremis. He has also published short stories in The New Yorker and elsewhere.

Since the 1990s Parks has written frequently for the London Review of Books and The New York Review of Books and has published nonfiction books, including A Season with Verona, shortlisted for the William Hill Sports Book of the Year and Teach Us to Sit Still, shortlisted for the Wellcome Book Prize.

Parks has translated works by Alberto Moravia, Antonio Tabucchi, Italo Calvino, Roberto Calasso, Niccolò Machiavelli, Giacomo Leopardi, Cesare Pavese, and Fleur Jaeggy. His nonfiction book Translating Style was described as "canonical in the field of translation studies". He twice won the John Florio Prize for translations from the Italian. In 2011 he co-curated the exhibition Money and Beauty: Bankers, Botticelli and the Bonfire of the Vanities at Palazzo Strozzi in Florence, and a book of the same title, edited by Ludovica Sebregondi and Tim Parks, was published in 2012 by Giunti. ISBN 978-8809767645. The exhibition was loosely based on Parks' book Medici Money: Banking, Metaphysics, and Art in Fifteenth-Century Florence.

== Personal life ==
Parks married Rita Baldassarre in 1979 and moved to Italy shortly thereafter. The couple have three children. They divorced in 2017. In 2020 he married Eleonora Gallitelli.

== Bibliography ==
Tim Parks' own bibliography is at his website.

=== Fiction ===
- Tongues of Flame. 1985.
- Loving Roger. 1986.
- Home Thoughts, 1987.
- Family Planning, 1989. The trials and tribulations of a mother, father and their children as they cope with the unexpected and sometimes violent behaviour of Raymond, who is suffering from a mental illness but will not agree to professional help.
- Cara Massimina, 1990, a murder story first published under the pseudonym "John MacDowell", but later in the author's own name. Later released in the US under the title Juggling the Stars.
- Goodness, 1991.
- Shear, 1993.
- Mimi's Ghost, 1995, sequel to Cara Massimina.
- Europa, 1997.
- Destiny, 1999.
- Judge Savage, 2003.
- Rapids, 2005.
- Talking About It, 2005. A collection of short stories.
- Cleaver, 2006.
- Dreams of Rivers and Seas, 2008.
- The Server, 2012. Subsequently published as Sex is Forbidden: A Novel.
- Painting Death, 2014. Book 3 in the Cara Massimina trilogy.
- Thomas and Mary: A Love Story, 2016.
- In Extremis, 2017.
- Italian Life: A Modern Fable of Loyalty and Betrayal, 2020.
- Hotel Milano, 2023.
- Mr Geography, 2024.

=== Nonfiction ===
- Italian Neighbours, 1992. Relates how the author and his wife came to a small town near Verona and how they integrate and become accustomed to the unusual habits of their newfound neighbours. ISBN 0099286955
- An Italian Education, 1996. Follow up to Italian Neighbours and recounts the milestones in the life of the author's children as they progress through the Italian school system. ISBN 0099286963
- Translating Style, 1997.
- Adultery and Other Diversions, 1999. Essays.
- Hell and Back: Reflections on Writers and Writing from Dante to Rushdie, 2001.
- A Season With Verona, following the fortunes of Hellas Verona F.C. in season 2000–2001. ISBN 0099422670
- Medici Money: Banking, Metaphysics, and Art in Fifteenth-Century Florence, 2005.
- "Did you really do that, Dad?" The Guardian, 16 February 2006.
- The Fighter: Essays, 2007.
- Teach Us to Sit Still: A Sceptic's Search for Health and Healing, 2010, Harvill Secker, ISBN 9781846553998. In this book, Parks describes his search for relief from chronic prostatitis/chronic pelvic pain syndrome (CPPS). His urologist thinks surgery will be the only solution, but after several examinations, no clear cause is found for the pain. Parks wonders if the pain can be (partly) psychosomatic. In his search, he reads the book A Headache in the Pelvis: The Definitive Guide to Understanding and Treating Chronic Pelvic Pain (ISBN 9781788171892) by psychologist (and long time CPPS-sufferer) David Wise and neurourologist Rodney Anderson (Stanford University), in which the authors describe methods of 'paradoxical relaxation' to prevent chronic tensing of the pelvic musculature. Parks starts doing the recommended relaxation exercises daily, and later on, also practices Vipassana-meditation. He experiences his body and life in a new way, and the pain diminishes for the most part.
- Italian Ways: On and Off the Rails from Milan to Palermo, 2013.
- Where I’m Reading From: The Changing World of Books, 2014.
- The Novel: A Survival Skill, 2015.
- A Literary Tour of Italy, 2015.
- Life and Work: Writers, Readers, and the Conversations Between Them, 2016.
- Out of My Head: On the Trail of Consciousness, 2018.
- "Her Programme," in Writers and Their Mothers, Dale Salwak, ed., 2018.
- "Is literary glory worth chasing?". NYR Daily. The New York Review of Books. 27 November 2018.
- Pen in Hand: Reading, Rereading and Other Mysteries, 2019.
- "Italy Notebook: Our life under lockdown, retracing Garibaldi's footsteps, and resisting the talk of war". New Statesman. 149 (5514): 33. 3–23 April 2020. online
- The Hero's Way: Walking with Garibaldi from Rome to Ravenna, 2021.
- Another Literary Tour of Italy, 2024.
- Across Sicily with Garibaldi's Thousand: An Adventure in Landscape and Italian Memory, 2026.

=== Translations of Italian works ===
- Alberto Moravia, Erotic Tales, Secker & Warburg, 1985. Original title La cosa.
- Alberto Moravia, The Voyeur, Secker & Warburg, 1986. Original title L'uomo che guarda.
- Antonio Tabucchi, Indian Nocturne, Chatto & Windus, 1988. Original title Notturno indiano.
- Alberto Moravia, Journey to Rome, Secker & Warburg, 1989. Original title Viaggio a Roma.
- Antonio Tabucchi, Vanishing Point, Chatto & Windus, 1989. Original title Il filo dell'orizzonte.
- Antonio Tabucchi, The Woman of Porto Pim, Chatto & Windus, 1989. Original title La donna di Porto Pim.
- Antonio Tabucchi, The Flying Creatures of Fra Angelico, Chatto & Windus, 1989. Original title I volatili del Beato Angelico.
- Fleur Jaeggy, Sweet Days of Discipline, Heinemann, 1991. Original title I beati anni del castigo. The translation won the John Florio Prize.
- Giuliana Tedeschi, There is a Place on Earth: A Woman in Birkenau, Pantheon Books, 1992. Original title C'è un punto della terra.
- Roberto Calasso, The Marriage of Cadmus and Harmony, Knopf, 1993. Original title Le nozze di Cadmo e Armonia. The translation won the Italo Calvino Prize.
- Italo Calvino, The Road to San Giovanni, Pantheon Books, 1993. Original title La strada di San Giovanni. The translation won the John Florio Prize.
- Italo Calvino, Numbers in the Dark, Pantheon Books, 1995. Original title Prima che tu dica pronto.
- Fleur Jaeggy, Last Vanities, New Directions, 1998. Original title La paura del cielo.
- Roberto Calasso, Ka, New York: Knopf, 1998. Original title Ka.
- Roberto Calasso, Literature and the Gods, New York: Knopf, 2000. Original title La letteratura e gli dei.
- Niccolò Machiavelli, The Prince, Penguin Classics, 2009. Original title Principe.
- Giacomo Leopardi, Passions, Yale University Press, 2014. Original title Le passioni (a selection from the Zibaldoni).
- Cesare Pavese, The Moon and the Bonfires, Penguin Classics, 2021. Original title La luna e i falò.
- Cesare Pavese, The House on the Hill, Penguin Classics, 2021. Original title La casa in collina.
- Roberto Calasso, The Book of All Books, Farrar, Straus and Giroux, 2021. Original title Libro di tutti i libri.
- Roberto Calasso, The Tablet of Destinies, Farrar, Straus and Giroux, 2022. Original title La tavoletta dei destini.
- Pier Paolo Pasolini, Boys Alive, New York Review Classics, 2023. Original title Ragazzi di vita.

== Secondary literature ==
- 2003: Gillian Fenwick: Understanding Tim Parks. University of South Carolina Press, Columbia, ISBN 1-57003-456-7.
- 2001: Gillian Fenwick: "Tim Parks (19 December 1954 - )," in Dictionary of Literary Biography, vol. 231: British Novelists Since 1960, Fourth Series. United States Gale, ISBN 0-7876-4648-2.
