= Tony Arnold (soprano) =

American soprano

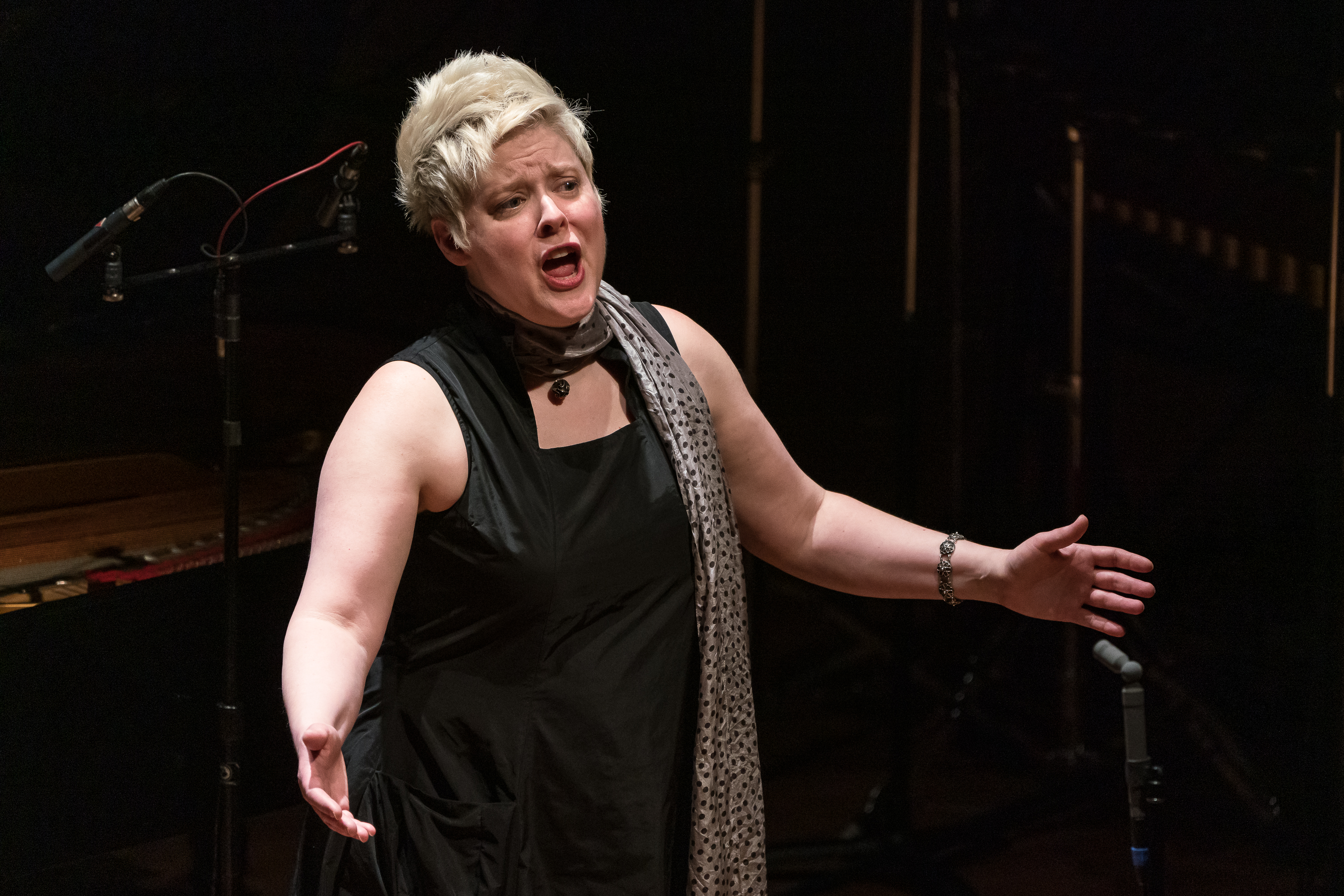
Tony Arnold performing at Alice Tully Hall during a concert in honor of the 90th birthday of George Crumb

Tony Arnold is an American soprano vocalist, specializing in contemporary chamber music. She was the 2015 winner of the Brandeis University Creative Arts Award.
