= Antonio di Benedetto =

Argentine novelist, short-story writer and journalist (1922–1986)

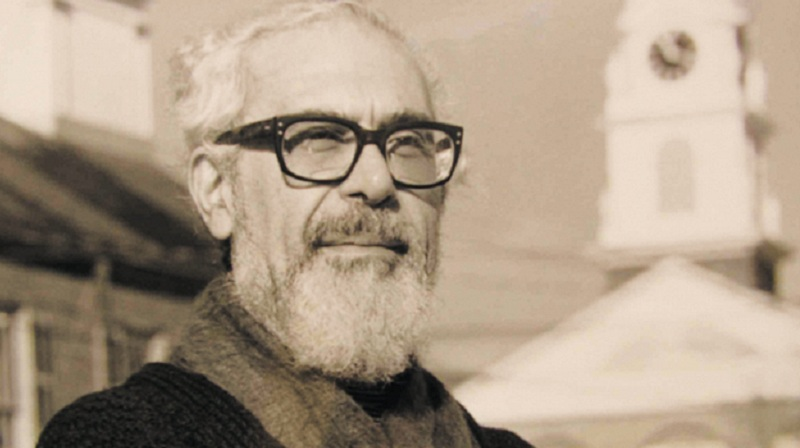
- Antonio di Benedetto around 1979
- Born: Antonio di Benedetto; 2 November 1922; Mendoza, Argentina
- Died: 10 October 1986 (aged 63); Buenos Aires, Argentina
- Occupation: Writer
- Writing career
- Period: 1953–1986
- Notable work: Zama (1956)

Antonio di Benedetto (2 November 1922 – 10 October 1986) was an Argentine novelist, short story writer and journalist.

== Career ==
Di Benedetto began writing and publishing stories in his adolescence, inspired by the works of Fyodor Dostoevsky and Luigi Pirandello. Mundo Animal, appearing in 1953, was his first story collection and won prestigious awards. A revised version came out in 1971, but the Xenos Books translation uses the first edition to catch the youthful flavor.

Antonio di Benedetto wrote five novels. Zama (1956) is considered by critics to be his magnum opus. El silenciero (1964, The Silentiary) is noteworthy for expressing his intense abhorrence of noise, and was followed by Las suicidas (1969, The Suicides). These three novels have come to be known as the "Trilogy of Expectation". Critics have compared his works to Alain Robbe-Grillet, Julio Cortázar and Ernesto Sábato.

In 1976, during the military dictatorship of General Videla, di Benedetto was imprisoned and tortured. Released a year later, he went into exile in Spain, then returned home in 1984. He travelled widely and won numerous awards, but never acquired a level of worldwide fame comparable to other Latin American writers, perhaps because his work was not translated into many languages.

== Works ==
=== Novels ===
- El pentágono (1955). Republished in 1974 as Anabella.
- Zama (1956). Translated with a foreword by Esther Allen (New York Review Books (NYRB), 2016)
- El Silenciero (1964). The Silentiary, trans. Esther Allen, with an introduction by Juan José Saer (NYRB, 2022)
- Las suicidas (1969). The Suicides, trans. Esther Allen (NYRB, 2025)
- Sombras, nada más... (1984)

=== Short story collections ===
- Mundo animal (1953). Animal World, trans. H. E. Francis, with an Afterword by Jorge García-Gómez. Grand Terrace, CA: Xenos Books.
- Grot (1957). Republished in 1969 as Cuentos claros
- Declinación y ángel (1958)
- El cariño de los tontos (1961)
- Absurdos (1978)
- Cuentos del exilio (1983)
- Cuentos completos (2006)

=== Compilations in English ===
- Nest in the Bones: Stories, trans. Martina Broner (Archipelago, 2017)

== Adaptations ==
Zama was adapted to film in 2017 by Argentine director Lucrecia Martel and received critical acclaim.

See also Aballay (film) based on the di Benedetto short story of the same name.

== Awards and honors ==
- 1973: Guggenheim Fellowship
- 1984: Platinum Konex Award
- 1986: Gran Premio de Honor de la SADE
