= Antonio Tabucchi =

Italian writer and academic (1943–2012)

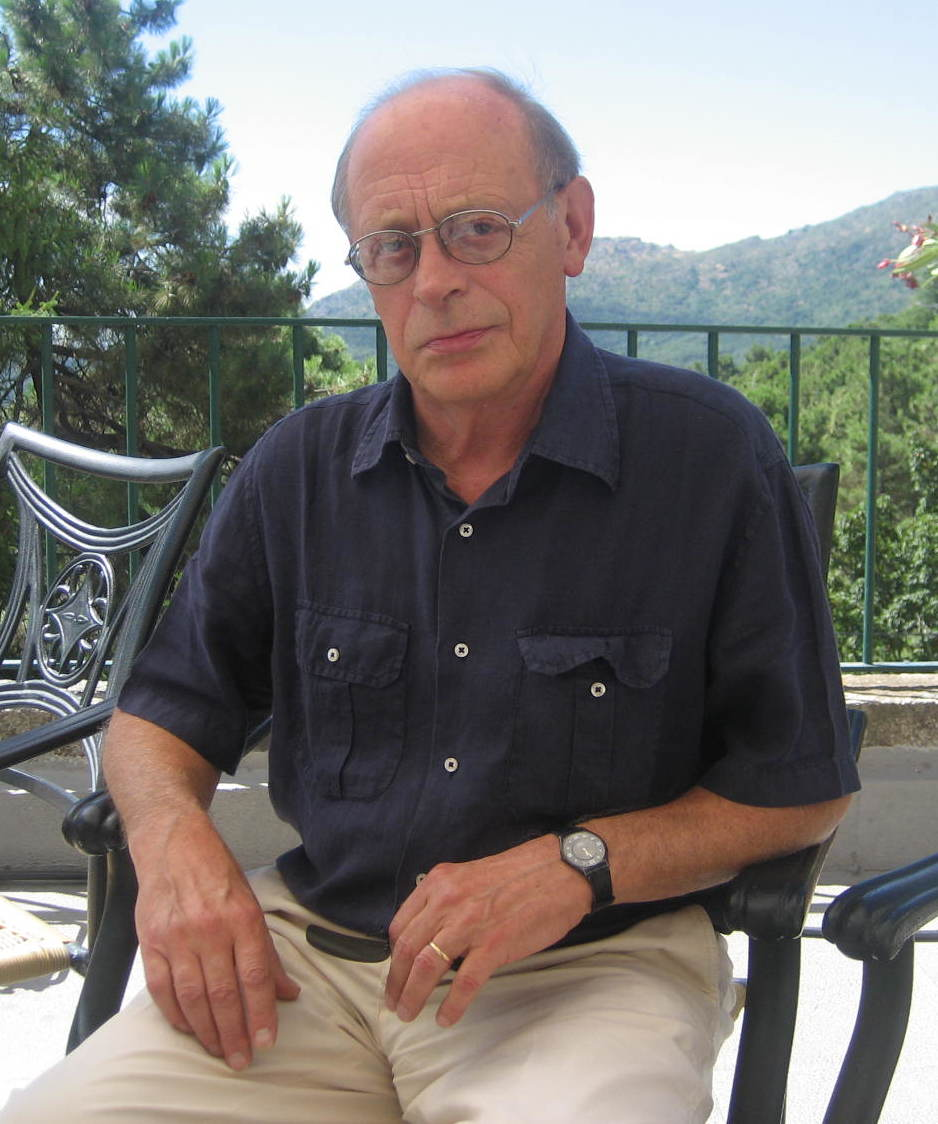
- Born: 24 September 1943; Pisa, Italy
- Died: 25 March 2012 (aged 68); Lisbon, Portugal
- Occupations: Novelist, short-story writer
- Spouse: Maria José de Lancastre
- Writing career
- Period: 1969–2012

Antonio Tabucchi (Italian: [anˈtɔːnjo taˈbukki]; 24 September 1943 – 25 March 2012) was an Italian writer and academic who taught Portuguese language and literature at the University of Siena, Italy. Deeply in love with Portugal, he was an expert, critic and translator of the works of Fernando Pessoa from whom he drew the conceptions of saudade, of fiction and of the heteronyms. Tabucchi was first introduced to Pessoa's works in the 1960s when attending the Sorbonne. He was so charmed that when he returned to Italy, he took an introductory course in Portuguese for a better comprehension of the poet.

His books and essays have been translated in 18 countries. Together with his wife, Maria José de Lancastre, he translated many works by Pessoa into Italian and has written a book of essays and a comedy about the writer. Tabucchi was awarded the French prize "Médicis étranger" for Indian Nocturne (Notturno indiano) and the premio Campiello, and the Aristeion Prize for Sostiene Pereira. In later life, he was mentioned as a contender for the Nobel Prize in Literature, a feat he never achieved.

== Early life ==
Antonio Tabucchi was born in Pisa, Italy, but grew up at his maternal grandparents' home in Vecchiano, a nearby village. During his years at university, he travelled widely around Europe on the trail of the authors he had encountered in his uncle's library. During one of these journeys, he found the poem "Tabacaria" (tobacco shop) in a bookstall near the Gare de Lyon in Paris, France, signed by Álvaro de Campos, one of the pen names of the Portuguese poet Fernando Pessoa. It was in the French translation by Pierre Hourcade. The book was a major influence on Tabucci's writing life for at least twenty years.

A visit to Lisbon sparked his love of the city of the fado and of that country as a whole. As a result, he graduated in 1969 with a thesis on "Surrealism in Portugal". He specialized at the Scuola Normale Superiore di Pisa in the seventies and in 1973 he was appointed as a teacher of Portuguese Language and Literature in Bologna. That year, he wrote his first novel, Piazza d'Italia (Bompiani 1975), in which he tried to describe history from the losers' point of view, in this case, the Tuscan anarchists, in the tradition of great Italian writers of a more or less recent past, such as Giovanni Verga, Federico De Roberto, Giuseppe Tomasi Di Lampedusa, Beppe Fenoglio, and contemporary authors, like Vincenzo Consolo.

== Career ==
In 1978, he was appointed to the University of Genoa, and published Il piccolo naviglio, followed by Il gioco del rovescio e altri racconti in 1981, and Donna di porto Pim (1983). His first important novel, Indian Nocturne, was published in 1984, and became the basis of a 1989 film directed by Alain Corneau. The protagonist tries to trace a friend who has disappeared in India but is actually searching for his own identity. He published Piccoli equivoci senza importanza in 1985 and, the next year, Il filo dell'orizzonte. This novel features another protagonist (Spino) on a quest to discover something (here, the identity of a corpse) but who is also looking for his own identity—which was to become a common mission for Tabucchi protagonists. Whether these characters succeed in the attempt is uncertain, but they are compelled to face their image as mirrored by others. A film was drawn from this book in 1993, directed by the Portuguese Fernando Lopes.

In 1987, when I volatili del Beato Angelico and Pessoana Minima were published, he received France's Prix Médicis for best foreign novel (Notturno indiano). The next year he wrote the comedy I dialoghi mancati. The President of Portugal appointed him the title Do Infante Dom Henrique in 1989, and that same year the French government named him a Chevalier des Arts et des Lettres. Tabucchi published Un baule pieno di gente. Scritti su Fernando Pessoa (Feltrinelli) in 1990, and the next year, L'angelo nero (1991). In 1991 he wrote in Portuguese Requiem: A Hallucination, a novel later translated into Italian (winner of Premio P.E.N. Club italiano) and he published Sogni di sogni.

In 1994 he released Gli ultimi tre giorni di Fernando Pessoa, as well as the novel that brought him the most recognition: Sostiene Pereira, winner of the Prizes Super Campiello, Scanno and Jean Monnet for European Literature. The protagonist of this novel becomes the symbol of the defence of freedom for information for the political opponents of all anti-democratic regimes. In Italy, during the election campaign, the opposition against the controversial communication magnate Silvio Berlusconi aggregated around this book. The director Roberto Faenza drew from it the eponymous film (1995) in which he cast Marcello Mastroianni as Pereira and Daniel Auteuil as Dr. Cardoso.

In 1997 Tabucchi wrote the novel The Missing Head of Damasceno Monteiro (La testa perduta di Damasceno Monteiro) based on the true story of a man whose headless corpse was found in a park. It was discovered that the man had been murdered in a police station of the Republican National Guard (GNR). The news story struck the writer's sensitivity and imagination. The event's setting in Porto also gave the author the opportunity to show his love for the city. In order to finish this novel, Tabucchi worked on the documents gathered by the investigators at the Council of Europe in Strasbourg who enforce civil rights and the conditions of detention in Europe, including the relationship between citizens and police. The novel proved prophetic when police Sergeant José dos Santos later confessed to the murder, was convicted and sentenced to 17 years' imprisonment. Also in 1997, Tabucchi wrote Marconi, se ben mi ricordo, followed the next year by L'Automobile, la Nostalgie et l'Infini (1998). That year the Leibniz Academy awarded him the Prize Nossack.

He wrote Gli Zingari e il Rinascimento and Ena poukamiso gemato likedes (Una camicia piena di macchie. Conversazioni di A.T. con Anteos Chrysostomidis) in 1999. In 2001 Tabucchi published the epistolary novel, Si sta facendo sempre più tardi (English translation, 2006: It's Getting Later All the Time). In it, 17 letters which celebrate the triumph of the word, which like "messages in the bottle", have no addressee, they are missives the author addressed to an "unknown poste restante". The book received the 2002 Prize France Culture (the French cultural radio) for foreign literature.

He used to spend six months of the year in Lisbon, with his wife, a native of the city, and their two children. The rest of the year he spent in Tuscany, where he taught Portuguese literature at the University of Siena. Tabucchi considered himself a writer only in an ontological sense because from the existential point of view, he was glad to define himself as a "university professor". For Tabucchi, literature was not a profession, "but something that involves desires, dreams and imagination". Tabucchi regularly contributed articles to the cultural pages of the newspapers Corriere della Sera and El País.

== Death ==
Tabucchi died in a hospital in Lisbon on 25 March 2012, after a long battle with cancer. He was 68.

== Honours ==
In 2007, he received an honorary doctorate from the University of Liège. The Portuguese government named him Commander of the Order of Prince Henry on 7 April 1989. In 1989, the French government named him Chevalier des Arts et des Lettres. In 2004, he was awarded the Francisco de Cerecedo journalism prize, granted by the Association of European Journalists and bestowed by Spain's then heir to the throne, Felipe, Prince of Asturias, now King Felipe VI, in recognition of the quality of his journalistic work and his outspoken defence of freedom of expression.

== Works ==
- Piazza d'Italia (1975), ISBN 88-07-01458-0
- Il piccolo naviglio (1978)
- Il gioco del rovescio e altri racconti (1981, short story collection), ISBN 88-07-01354-1
- Donna di Porto Pim (1983)
- Indian Nocturne (Notturno indiano, 1984)
- Little Misunderstandings of No Importance (Piccoli equivoci senza importanza, 1985, short story collection), ISBN 88-07-01306-1
- Il filo dell'orizzonte (1986), ISBN 88-07-01322-3
- The Flying Creatures of Fra Angelico (I volatili del Beato Angelico, 1987) ISBN 978-1935744566
- Pessoana mínima (1987)
- I dialoghi mancati (1988), ISBN 88-07-05058-7
- Un baule pieno di gente. Scritti su Fernando Pessoa (1990, essays), ISBN 88-07-05080-3
- L'angelo nero (1991, short story collection), ISBN 88-07-01414-9
- Sogni di sogni (1992)
- Requiem: A Hallucination (Requiem: uma alucinação, 1991), ISBN 88-07-01433-5
- Gli ultimi tre giorni di Fernando Pessoa (1994), ISBN 88-389-1056-1
- Pereira Maintains (Sostiene Pereira, 1994), ISBN 88-07-01461-0
- Dove va il romanzo (1995, essay), ISBN 88-86680-00-7
- Carlos Gumpert, Conversaciones con Antonio Tabucchi (1995)
- The Missing Head of Damasceno Monteiro (La testa perduta di Damasceno Monteiro, 1997), ISBN 88-07-01518-8
- Marconi, se ben mi ricordo (1997), ISBN 88-397-0978-9
- L'Automobile, la Nostalgie et l'Infini (1998)
- La gastrite di Platone (1998), ISBN 88-389-1421-4
- Gli Zingari e il Rinascimento (1999), ISBN 88-380-8010-0
- Ena poukamiso gemato likedes (Una camicia piena di macchie. Conversazioni di A.T. con Anteos Chrysostomidis, 1999)
- Dreams of Dreams and the Last Three Days of Fernando Pessoa (2000), ISBN 978-0-87286-368-2
- It's Getting Later All the Time (Si sta facendo sempre più tardi. Romanzo in forma di lettere, 2001), ISBN 88-07-01590-0
- Autobiografie altrui. Poetiche a posteriori (2003), ISBN 88-07-42098-8
- Tristano muore. Una vita (2004), ISBN 88-07-01646-X
- Time Ages in a Hurry (Il tempo invecchia in fretta, 2009), ISBN 9780914671053
- Viaggi e altri viaggi (2010)
- Racconti con figure (2011), ISBN 88-389-2494-5
- Girare per le strade (2012)
- For Isabel: A Mandala (Per Isabel) (2017)
