= Joe Pan =

American writer

- Born: Joe Millar; Florida, USA
- Education: University of North Carolina at Greensboro (1996-2000); Iowa Writers' Workshop; (2000-2002)
- Occupations: Writer, publisher
- Spouse: Wendy Pan Millar
- Writing career
- Period: 2007–present
- Genres: Fiction, poetry
- Website: joepan.com

Joe Pan (born Joe Millar) is an American writer and publisher based in Los Angeles. He has written five collections of poetry, and his debut novel Florida Palms was published by Simon & Schuster in 2025. He is the founding publisher and editor of Brooklyn Arts Press (winner of the National Book Award for Poetry for publishing Daniel Borzutzky's The Performance of Becoming Human), and the publisher of Augury Books.

== Early life and education ==
Pan grew up in Florida'a Space Coast region. He received a bachelor's degree from the University of North Carolina at Greensboro, and a master of fine arts from the Iowa Writers' Workshop. He moved to Brooklyn in 2003.

== Career ==
=== Writing ===
Pan's first poetry collection, Autobiomythography & Gallery, was published in 2007. It was named Best First Book of 2007 by Coldfront Magazine and was shortlisted for the Younger Poets Prize, National Poetry Series, and Walt Whitman Award. His second poetry collection, Hiccups, was published by Augury Books in 2015. In a review in Luna Luna Magazine, Joanna Valente wrote, "Pan gracefully and poignantly connects and interweaves all the mysteries of our lives in such a way where it's not just keenly observant, but fiercely unforgiving of the world around us." Pan's fifth poetry collection, Operating Systems, was published by Spork Press in 2019. It includes the long poem "Ode to the MQ-9 Reaper", which was first printed in the literary quarterly Epiphany and was excerpted in The New York Times in 2013. Reviewing the book in The Brooklyn Rail, J. C. Hallman called it "that rarest of rare books—excellent precisely to the extent that it is impossible to classify."

Pan's debut novel, Florida Palms, about a group of young men dragged into a drug-running operation, was published by Simon & Schuster in 2025. The New York Times Book Review wrote: "The pleasure here, as any noir fan can tell you, lies less in the larger plot points than in the specifics (a mark surprised by a hit man while half-naked and painted to look like a chicken, the handlebars of a biker’s chopper decorated with a human kneecap) and in the overall vibe of doom—a musky, Florida-specific stew of sweat, blood, swamp gas and amphetamine addiction." The Library Journal gave Florida Palms a starred review, calling it "a must-read" and adding, "Pan’s intense drama has a Sons of Anarchy vibe but with a greater pathos."

=== Publishing and editing ===
Pan is the publisher and editor-in-chief of Brooklyn Arts Press, an independent publisher which he founded in Brooklyn in 2007. It published The Performance of Becoming Human by Daniel Borzutzky, which won the 2016 National Book Award for Poetry. In 2017, Brooklyn Arts Press acquired Augury Books, an independent press founded by Kate Angus in 2010.

Pan was the first poetry editor for Hyperallergic, serving in that capacity from 2012 to 2016. He and Jason Koo edited the Brooklyn Poets Anthology, an anthology of Brooklyn-based poets, published in 2017.

== Bibliography ==
=== Novel ===
- Florida Palms (Simon & Schuster, 2025)

=== Poetry ===
- Autobiomythography & Gallery (Brooklyn Arts Press, 2007)
- Hiccups (Augury Books, 2015)
- Soffritto (Minor Poets, 2018)
- The Art Is a Lonely Hunter (Post House Books, 2019)
- Operating Systems (Spork Press, 2019)

=== Nonfiction ===
- Infinite Record: Archive, Memory, Performance (Brooklyn Arts Press, 2017)

=== As editor ===
- Brooklyn Poets Anthology (Brooklyn Arts Press, 2017)
