= Brooklyn Arts Press =

Publishing Agency

- Founded: 2007
- Founder: Joe Pan
- Country of origin: United States
- Headquarters location: Brooklyn, New York
- Distribution: Small Press Distribution
- Key people: Noah Eli Gordon, Anselm Berrigan, Joe Pan, Michael Ernest Sweet, Daniel Borzutzky
- Publication types: Books
- Fiction genres: poetry, fiction, art
- Official website: www.brooklynartspress.com

Brooklyn Arts Press (BAP) is an independent publisher of poetry, literary fiction, non-fiction, art books, and music. The company was founded in 2007 by writer Joe Pan in Brooklyn, New York. In 2015, the small press was compared to Radiohead and Louis CK for running a promotional sale that allowed readers to pay whatever they wanted for a new Noah Eli Gordon paperback book, leading to local and international speculation as to whether the campaign would be instrumental in changing how poetry books are sold in the US. In 2016, Daniel Borzutzky's book The Performance of Becoming Human, published by BAP that April, won the National Book Award for Poetry.

== History ==
Brooklyn Arts Press, or BAP, began with the self-publication of Joe Pan's first book, Autobiomythography & Gallery, after his debut manuscript was named a finalist for several major poetry contests, including the Yale Series of Younger Poets Competition, the Academy of American Poets’ Walt Whitman Award, and the National Poetry Series. The book went on to be named “Best First Book of the Year” by Coldfront Magazine, and allowed BAP to begin publishing more books. While the recession halted production in 2008 and 2009, in 2010, the publishing company soon “broke the barrier where each book pays for the next."

Since then, the small press has published between 9-12 books per year, including Christopher Hennessy's Love-In-Idleness, which was a finalist for the Thom Gunn Award in 2012.

On June 1, 2017 Brooklyn Arts Press released the debut LP from Brooklyn indie-rock trio Tuff Sunshine.

== Notable Authors ==
- Daniel Borzutzky (National Book Award Winner)
- Alexander Boldizar
- Joe Pan
- Anaïs Duplan
- Anselm Berrigan
- Carol Guess
- Michael Ernest Sweet
- Noah Eli Gordon
