= Dibnah =

Dibnah is a surname. Notable people with the surname include:

- Corinne Dibnah (born 1962), Australian professional golfer
- Fred Dibnah (1938–2004), English steeplejack and television personality
