= Low Water (disambiguation) =

Low Water or Low Waters may refer to:

- Low water, or low tide, when the water of a tide stops falling
- Low Water or Season of the Harvest, the third and final season of lunar and civil Egyptian calendars
- Low Water (band), an American rock band
- Low Waters, Hamilton, a place in Scotland
