= Chimney felling =

Process of demolishing a chimney

Chimney felling is the practice of demolishing or "felling" a chimney stack. Modern health and safety rules now largely prohibit the practice in industrialized areas; the current technique is to pack explosives around the base of the chimney. It is, however, popular within China's old industrial centers.

The UK's Fred Dibnah, a steeplejack, became a celebrity for his technique of chimney felling. He would remove bricks from the base of the chimney and shore up the structure with wooden supports. When he had judged that enough of the chimney had been removed so as to not be able to support its own weight, he would set fire to the supports. He would then stand clear as the chimney belched its last smoke.

Chimney fellings were documented in films in such as Demolition of a Mill Chimney in Leeds (1901).
