= Fred Dibnah =

English steeplejack, mechanic and television personality (1938–2004)

Coordinates: 53.576561°N 2.413272°W

Fred Dibnah MBE
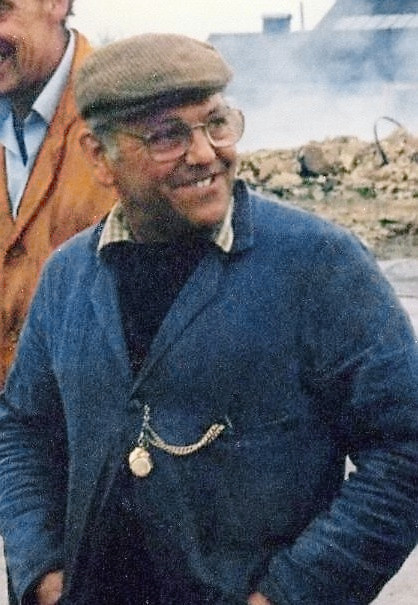
- Dibnah in 1985
- Born: 28 April 1938; Bolton, Lancashire, England
- Died: 6 November 2004 (aged 66); Bolton, Greater Manchester, England
- Occupations: Television presenter; steeplejack; mechanical engineer
- Spouses: Alison Foster (m. 1967; div. 1985); Susan Lorenz (m. 1987; div. 1996); Sheila Grundy (m. 1998)
- Children: 5

Frederick Dibnah (28 April 1938 – 6 November 2004) was an English steeplejack and television personality. Having a keen interest in mechanical engineering, he described himself as a "backstreet mechanic."

When Dibnah was born, Britain relied heavily upon coal to fuel its industry. As a child, he was fascinated by the steam engines which powered the many textile mills in Bolton, but he paid particular attention to chimneys and the men who worked on them. He began his working life as a joiner, before becoming a steeplejack. From age 22, he served for two years in the Army Catering Corps of the British Army, undertaking his National Service. Once demobilized, he returned to steeplejacking but met with limited success until he was asked to repair Bolton's parish church tower. The resulting publicity provided a boost to his business, ensuring he was almost never out of work.

In 1978, while making repairs to Bolton Town Hall, Dibnah was filmed by a regional BBC news crew. The BBC then commissioned a documentary, which followed the rough-hewn steeplejack as he worked on chimneys, interacted with his family and talked about his favourite hobby – steam. His Lanky manner and gentle, self-taught philosophical outlook proved popular with viewers and he featured in a number of television programmes. Towards the end of his life, the decline of Britain's industry was mirrored by a decline in his steeplejacking business and Dibnah increasingly came to rely on public appearances and after-dinner speaking to support his income. In 1998, he presented a programme on Britain's industrial history and went on to present a number of series, largely concerned with the Industrial Revolution and its mechanical and architectural legacy.

Dibnah died from bladder cancer in November 2004, aged 66.

== Early life ==
=== Childhood ===
Frederick Dibnah was born on 28 April 1938. He was the son of Frank and Betsy Dibnah (née Travis), who were initially both employed at a bleach works. His mother later worked as a charwoman at a gas works. Named after his uncle Frederick, he was brought up in the historic Lancashire town of Bolton, then a predominantly industrial town with a history in the spinning and weaving of cotton. As a child, Dibnah was fascinated by the sights and sounds of industry and the dozens of chimney stacks visible around Burnden Park, and paid particular attention to the steeplejacks he saw on his way to school. A popular pastime for local children was playing around the many mill lodges (industrial ponds) which once were common in the area. An inventive child, Dibnah and some friends designed a makeshift diving suit from a crisp tin, a car inner tube and some piping. After being told to remove it from the local swimming baths, they tested it in one of the lodges, but were unsuccessful.

The Bolton arm of the Manchester, Bolton and Bury Canal was one of Dibnah's regular haunts. The canal was by then largely disused (the Bolton arm had been mostly closed in 1924) and Dibnah sometimes dredged it with an iron hook on a rope, for what he called 'plunder'. Much of this was stored in the back yard of his mother's house. Dibnah and his friend Alan Heap built a canoe from old bicycle wheels (cut in half to make the ribs), slate laths and a canvas sheet from the back of a lorry. Much to the consternation of his mother, Dibnah sailed the boat along the nearby River Croal. He once astonished his teachers when, following the theft of the school keys, he cut new keys for each classroom door.

=== As a young man ===
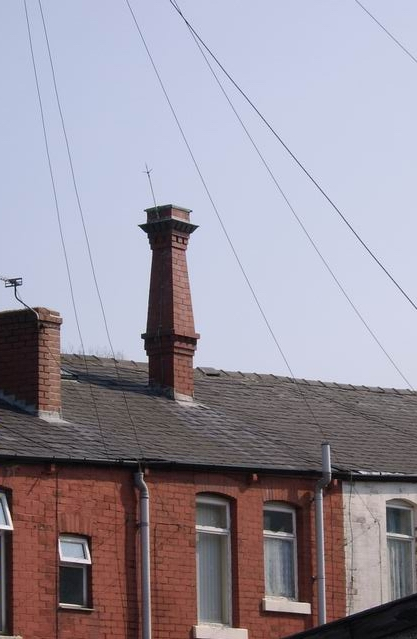
The chimney built by Dibnah for his mother, in Bolton

At school Dibnah was placed in an art class (his reading and writing skills were judged to be poor), following which he spent three years at art college, where his work was based mainly on industrial themes such as machinery, pithead gear and spinning mills. On leaving college at 16 he was offered a job at a funeral parlour, but left quickly to begin work at a local joinery workshop.

He clapped that chimney on the roof when he was sixteen, I've had to live with it ever since. It's awful. I came home one day from work and there it was, sticking up in the sky. The photographer came from the Evening News. People drove here on Sunday afternoons to stare at it. Everyone said our Fred was a lunatic.

— Betsy Dibnah

Dibnah had watched the activities of steeplejacks throughout his childhood, and first witnessed a chimney felling from his father's allotment near Bolton's greyhound track at Raikes Park. The steeplejacks removed the top of the chimney and then created a hole in its base, propped with blocks of wood. They then lit a fire, destroying the supports and causing the chimney to collapse. Unfortunately, on this occasion the chimney fell in the wrong direction, onto the greyhound track's dog kennels, a local café and a series of power cables.

His first job that involved ladders was given to him while he still worked as a joiner. He was asked to point a garden wall and then the gable end of the customer's house. He used several short ladders, lashed together with rope and hardboard. This gave Dibnah valuable experience and his employer expanded the business to include property repairs. Aged about 17–18 he climbed the 262-foot (80 m) chimney at Barrow Bridge, for a 10 shilling bet. During the night he took two Union Flags to the top and secured each to the lightning conductors there. The Bolton Evening News reported the incident, with a photograph of Dibnah's feat, but attributed it to the activities of students from Manchester University. At about the same time, Dibnah decided to replace the chimney stack at his mother's house on Alfred Street with one of his own design, as his mother used only one fireplace—leaving four of the five chimney pots redundant. As the single opening at the top of the new stack was only about 4 inches (10 cm) wide, the flue needed regular maintenance. On one occasion, he was cleaning the flue using a sack of bricks tied to a rope when the sack ripped open, breaking several pipes and flooding his mother's kitchen. After the death of his mother, the house was sold and the council placed a preservation order on the chimney, which remains standing as of 2026..

=== National service ===
Aged 22, Dibnah was conscripted into the army to complete his National Service and was given a position in the cook house. He spent six weeks training at Aldershot, before being sent to Catterick to learn the basics of army catering. He was then posted with the 14th/20th King's Hussars and sent to West Germany. There he persuaded his commanding officer to let him repair the regiment's farmhouse (used for stabling horses and hounds) and he was soon given a more permanent position as a builder and handyman. He dug a 35-foot (11 m) deep shaft into which the horse manure and dog faeces would be emptied and he also fed the animals. He impressed his commanding officers by making a weathercock from army kitchen trays, but was also chastised when he was found with a 1914 Luger P08 pistol he had bought from a fellow soldier. He often received parcels of alcohol and tobacco from his mother, which allowed him to maintain the habits he had formed when he began his working life. Although Dibnah initially resented being called into service, he would later be more positive about the experience:

It wasn't a bad thing, if National Service had been kept going it might have kept all the vandals and hooligans we have now in line.

== Steeplejack ==
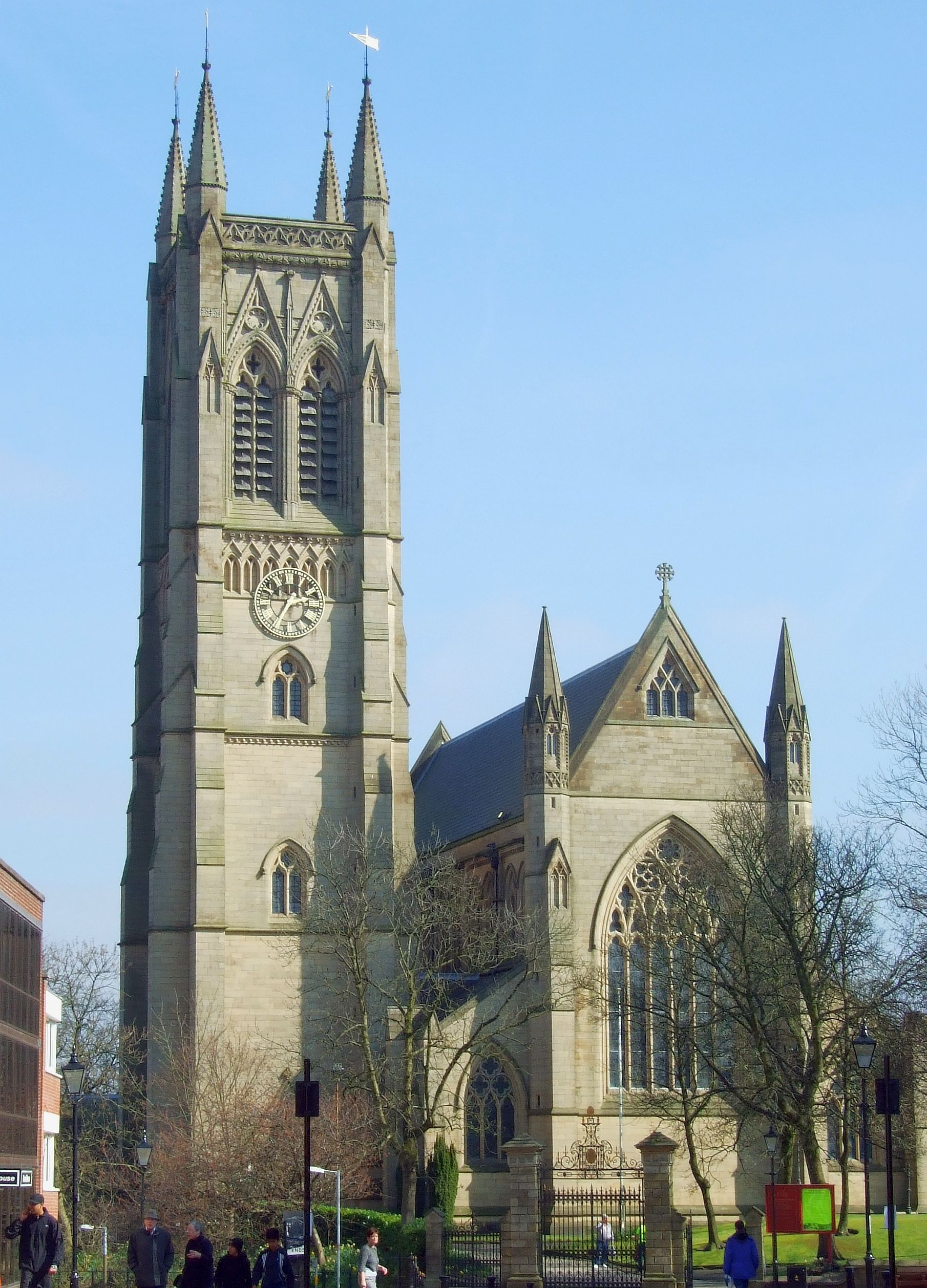
Bolton parish church

On his return from National Service in 1962 Dibnah retrieved his tools from storage, bought a 1927 350 cc AJS motorcycle for 21 guineas and looked for work. Bolton, however, was in the midst of post-industrial decline; between 1957 and 1965 about 70 mills were closed in the town, leaving only 37 mills operational and about 50 disused. Initially he was unable to find much work and existed on smaller, domestic jobs, until he earned enough to buy his own set of ladders and secured his first commission while working at a local mill. He was paid £140 to point a mill tower, which he did on weekends. He struggled, however, to get any more meaningful work until he met Lonsdale Bonner, one of his teachers from art college. The two agreed a deal whereby Bonner would be paid a commission for each job he got for Dibnah. His first job was dismantling a chimney alongside the Manchester and Bolton Railway, a difficult proposition, as a mistake could force the temporary closure of the railway. The two managed to gain commissions for several jobs, but their relationship was terminated when Dibnah was called upon to undertake another six months of National Service.

He was then commissioned to repair a chimney at a local brewery. While working on this, he met a local welder who also knew the vicar of Bolton (Richard Greville Norburn), who wanted some repairs made to Bolton parish church's weathervanes. The vicar drove a 1929 Humber limousine and was impressed by Dibnah's AJS motorcycle; the two quickly became friends. The church was the tallest building in Bolton and once Dibnah had repaired the weathervane the vicar asked him to gild it. Dibnah appeared in the local newspaper and the publicity and his friendship with the vicar enabled him to gain more work from the local clergy.

His next major job was for local firm Hick Hargreaves, the proceeds of which enabled him to expand his collection of ladders to 30. He was commissioned to remove the top half of a 270-foot (82 m) chimney and employed an assistant, Percy Porter. The top of the chimney contained a length of railway line which had been used for lifting materials during construction. Dibnah hacksawed the line into pieces, letting each piece fall to the ground, while his assistant below kept the area clear. He then spent the next six months removing each brick by hand while the chimney was still in use, as the factory could not afford to halt production.

=== First marriage ===
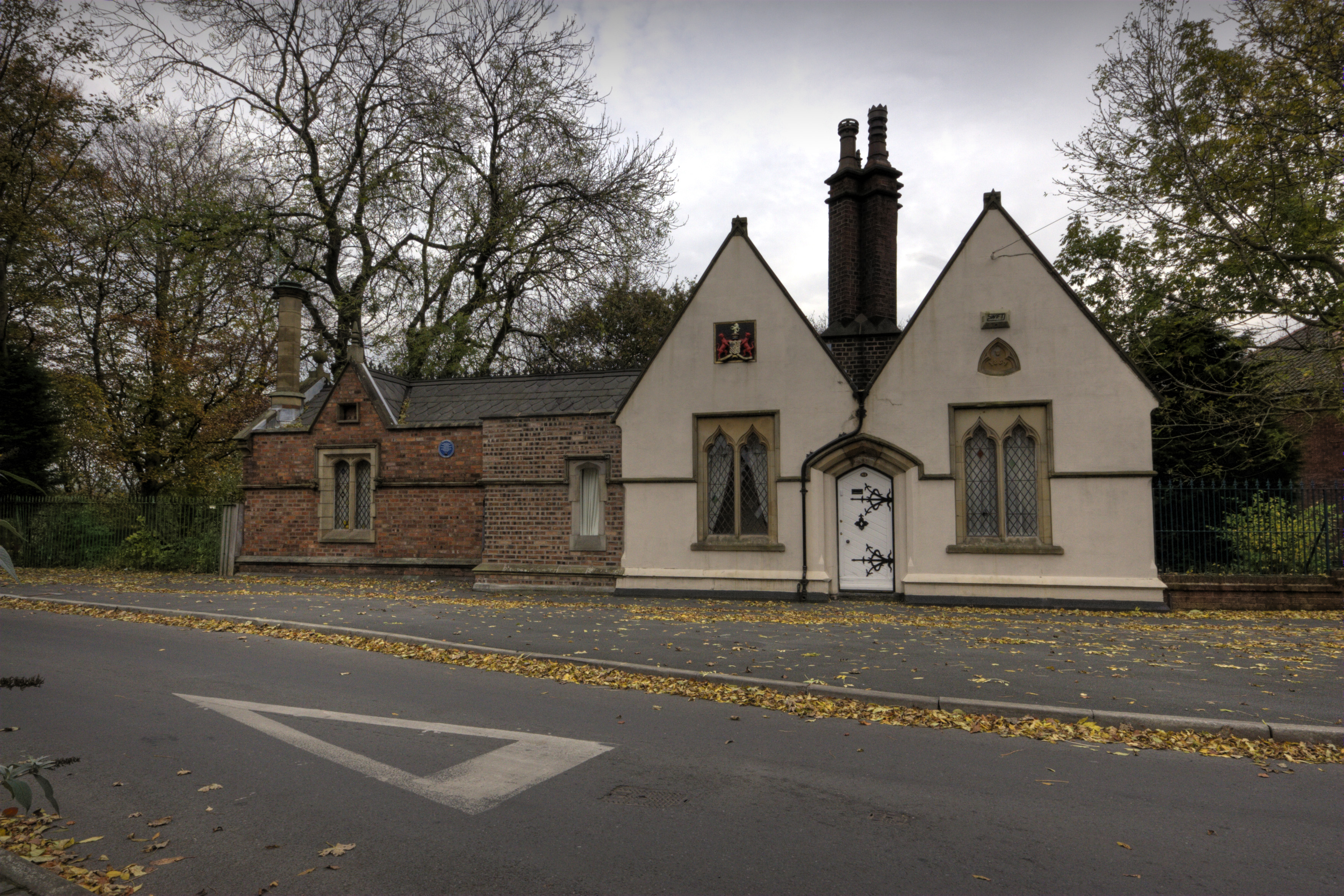
Dibnah's home, 121 Radcliffe Road, a former Victorian gatehouse of Leverhulme Park, Bolton, later the Fred Dibnah Heritage Centre, now closed

In 1967, following disagreements over who should be invited to their wedding, Dibnah and 19-year-old hairdresser Alison Mary Foster eloped to Gretna Green in Scotland, to get married. Dibnah had first spotted Alison from the top of a chimney and, when one day she walked into the pub where he was drinking, he asked her out; six weeks later, the two became engaged. They left notes for their parents, caught a train to Carlisle and from there on a series of buses to Dumfries. They had initially planned to stay at the house of a friend but as he had returned to Bolton for his holidays, they stayed instead at a local farmhouse. The two had to be resident for at least 21 days to be married and so Dibnah agreed to point the gable ends of a local hotel in exchange for bed and board.

On 19 May, the two married at the church at Gretna Green and returned to live at Dibnah's mother's house. They later moved into a Victorian gatehouse on the Earl of Bradford's estate, just outside Bolton. Dibnah spent years restoring the property, including building an extension. The house was a listed building and so he had to source appropriately aged bricks for the extension. A vicar offered him some of the old gravestones from the church graveyard, which Dibnah then used to create the stone lintels and mullions, though he later expressed his fear that his property would now be haunted. The couple later purchased the house for £5,000, although it required major repairs to stabilize the rear wall.

The couple had their first child, a girl named Jayne, in June 1968. Alison was initially worried about her husband's occupation but learned to deal with the risk and to trust Fred. She organised his accounts and even collected debts. She also helped him demolish some of the chimneys that he worked on by lighting the fire to burn away the temporary supports he had put in place.

=== Chimney felling ===
Having mastered his trade repairing chimneys, Dibnah became aware of the demand for a cost-effective method of demolishing them. He offered to remove them without using explosives by cutting an ingress at the base of the chimney, supporting the brickwork with wooden props, and then burning away the props so that the chimney fell, hopefully in the intended direction. Although this was a tried and tested method, it was not without its opponents. On one occasion he was contracted by the local council to fell two chimneys. The contract obliged him to dismantle each by hand, but he decided to fell them by cutting away the base. The first chimney collapsed as planned, but the council terminated his contract and refused to pay. Dibnah contacted the borough engineer and offered to fell the second chimney for no charge, to prove the effectiveness of his technique. He even offered to let the engineer light the fire, but the wind blew so hard that the chimney did not draw the flames and once the props had been burnt through, it remained standing. Dibnah resorted to using a hydraulic jack to apply extra pressure to the intact side of the base and the chimney eventually fell. He later told the engineer that "it was all about fine balancing and counteracting high wind forces."

He almost lost his life in 1997 when a concrete chimney he had been asked to fell on Canvey Island began to collapse before the felling team had finished preparing the base. As the team ran from the chimney, Dibnah tripped and fell and was greeted by the sight of 2,500 tonnes of concrete leaning toward him, but fortunately the chimney righted itself and then fell in the opposite direction. The last chimney he felled, which was his 90th, was in Royton in Manchester, in May 2004.

=== Steam ===
Dibnah's interest in steam power stemmed from his childhood observations of the steam locomotives on the nearby railway line, and his visits to his father's workplace—a bleach works in Bolton—where he was fascinated by the steam engines used to drive the line shafting. A small mill near his childhood home was sometimes mothballed and Dibnah once broke in:

I remember getting into the mill and lifting up a dust sheet to have a look at the engine they'd got under it. I found there was this beautiful British racing green steam engine under there with all the brasses left on. The boilers were still there and there was plenty of grease on everything, all ready and waiting for the next job. It was a bit sad really to see it standing there idle like that.

— Fred Dibnah

... we steamed about twenty miles through the night. Back then in the days of gas lamps it were quite exciting. It were near the end of the steam era and the fireman knew there were no future for him so he didn't give a monkey's and he gave me the job of firing the locomotive. I remember him saying to me, "It doesn't matter what you do, as long as you don't lose the shovel." It were really good fun and I finished up doing it lots and lots of times

— Fred Dibnah

He later became a steam enthusiast, befriending many of the engine drivers and firemen who worked on the nearby railway. As a teenager he met a driver who invited him onto the footplate of his locomotive and who asked him to keep the boiler supplied with fuel. Dibnah became so enamoured with steam engines that he eventually looked for one he could buy. He learned of a steamroller kept in a barn near Warrington and which the owners had bought from Flintshire County Council. He had the boiler pressure-tested and, despite its being in poor condition, bought it for £175. He towed it to a friend's house, spent a fortnight making various repairs, and drove it to his mother's house in Bolton.

After he had married and bought his own property on Radcliffe New Road, he cut an access road to the garden of his new house and moved the steamroller there. Restoring the engine took many years, as Dibnah had to create his own replacement parts, using Victorian engineering techniques and equipment he built in his garden. The boiler was in poor condition and needed serious work, but Dibnah fell back on local knowledge and was eventually able to build a new boiler. Once it was restored, he used the 1910 Aveling and Porter steamroller together with a living van he bought and restored, to take his family around the local steam fairs. While driving the vehicle was relatively safe, Dibnah had experienced several mishaps, including one instance when he lost control while descending a steep hill and was forced to drive the engine into a concrete barrier to bring it to a halt, smashing the front fork in the process.

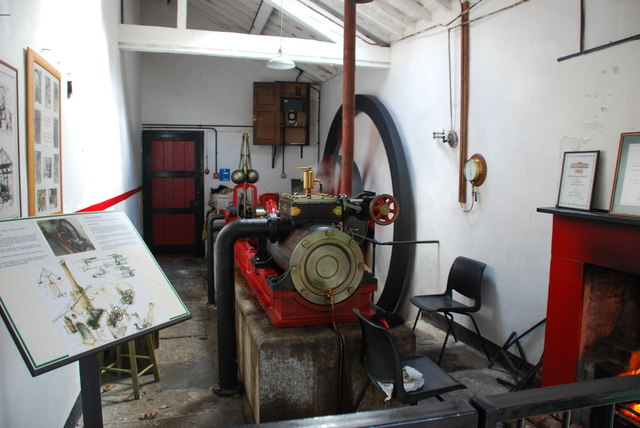
The single-cylinder engine restored by Dibnah and Carney

Restoring the steamroller placed a heavy burden upon his marriage and Alison would often complain that her husband spent more time in the shed, repairing the engine, than he did in the house. He responded by naming the vehicle Alison, telling his wife "It's not every woman that has a steam engine named after her." Alison eventually developed an affection for the antique vehicle, saying, "We've done without for so many years to get it built up. I couldn't bear to part with it. There's too much of us in it."

His next purchase, made in the autumn of 1980, was a 1912 Aveling & Porter traction engine. Dibnah paid a friend £2,300 for the vehicle and moved it to the garden behind his home. He built a steam-driven workshop in his garden, salvaging parts from various mills, including line shaft gear and a stationary engine from a mill in Oldham. He gave a conservative estimate of four years to complete the work, but the restoration eventually took 27 years. The engine was sold at auction in July 2010 for £240,000.

In 1988, he was asked by Caernarfon Council to make repairs to a chimney at Parc Glynllifon. Beneath the chimney, an engine room contained an 1854 single-cylinder steam engine in poor condition. Dibnah repaired the chimney and several weeks later was asked to repair the engine, which he dismantled during the winter of 1988/89 and took back to Bolton. With his assistant Neil Carney, he spent six months repairing the engine. The two sourced a replacement boiler from a local pork pie factory and re-installed the engine in Wales. Dibnah later won a prize for the quality of the restoration work. He also spent about seven months restoring the boiler, engine and blunger at Wetheriggs Pottery near Penrith.

== Fame ==
=== Fred Dibnah, Steeplejack ===
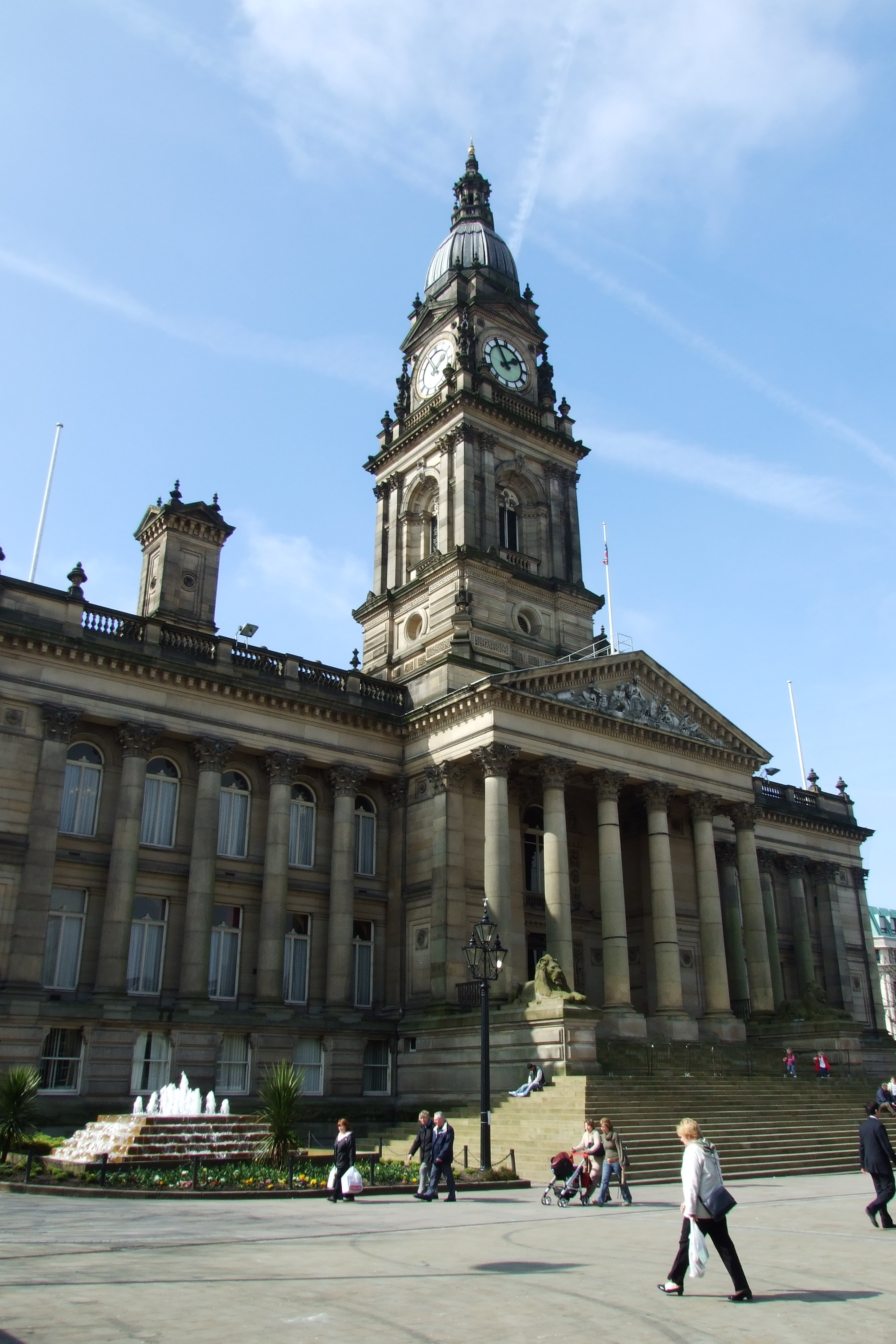
Bolton Town Hall

In 1978, Dibnah was commissioned to make repairs to Bolton Town Hall. Decades of exposure to soot and rain had caused serious damage to the clock tower and Dibnah alerted the Clerk of Works to the condition of the 16 stone pillars at the top of the tower. He bought new stone, built a lathe in his workshop and created the replacement pillars. He was given the job of repairing the clock tower and he also gilded the golden sphere at the top of the building. While Dibnah was working from his bosun's chair, a public relations officer at the Town Hall informed Dibnah that BBC Look North West wanted to interview him. The following week, the film crew arrived and Alistair MacDonald conducted the interview from the top of the building, with Dibnah perched outside on his scaffolding.

His warm and friendly manner combined with his enthusiasm and broad Lancashire accent proved popular and he was later contacted by producer Don Haworth, with a view to making a documentary. After several meetings over the course of a few weeks, filming began early one morning just as Dibnah had climbed to the top of a 245-foot (75 m) chimney at Shaw and Crompton, Oldham. Sporadic filming took place over an 18-month period and captured Dibnah (with assistant Donald Paiton) working on a range of buildings, spending time with his family and enjoying his hobbies. Giulio Briccialdi's Carnival of Venice (performed by James Galway) was the music chosen to accompany Dibnah's work on Bolton Town Hall. One of the more notable aspects was Dibnah's 1979 demolition of a chimney in Rochdale. Standing only yards away from the base of the chimney as it began to collapse, his retreat to safety and subsequent boyish outburst of "Did you like that?" endeared him to viewers.

Fred Dibnah, Steeplejack won the 1979 BAFTA award for best documentary, and over the years Haworth returned to film more documentaries. With his newly found fame, however, came distractions from his work. Visitors would arrive at his house, to see his garden. He began to receive fan mail; one individual wrote to offer Dibnah a steam-powered machine he no longer wanted. One company, who were apparently disturbed to see Dibnah's matches being extinguished by the wind while at the top of a chimney, sent him a sample of their windproof matches. Filming would also interfere with his work. Cameraman Martin Lightening would climb with Dibnah to the top of a chimney—with a 16mm film camera—and film him at work, often hundreds of feet above the ground.

I've seen them from close-up and they're fantastic, great big stones perched two hundred feet up in the sky, covered in incredible carvings and all fitting perfectly, in an attempt to keep them up for ever. That's why I don't get much pleasure demolishing a chimney, when I think of those fellows manhandling tens of thousands of bricks and tons of mortar, to build the thing in the first place.

— Fred Dibnah

Several years later, Dibnah and his family went on holiday, to Blackpool. The trip was filmed for television and showed Dibnah's preference for working rather than holidaying. He did however manage to undertake the removal of a small chimney stack from a business in the town, under a distinctly grey sky and aided by his wife, Alison. His payment for the job was a new front plate for the boiler of his traction engine. Dibnah, however, refused to take any more holidays and, after 18 years of marriage, Alison booked and paid for a holiday to Greece, taking their three children (Jayne, Lorna and Caroline) with her. Dibnah remained at home and was surprised when, upon her return, she asked for a divorce.

One day in October 1985, Dibnah attended a solid fuel exhibition in nearby Bury. Upon his return he discovered that Alison had left the house, taking with her their three children, the dog and some items of furniture. Short of money, he was forced to sell his antique AJS motorcycle. He found life without his family difficult but defended his wife: "There is no doubt whatsoever, she were a good help to me and I'm going to miss her. It was just that all the pressure got too much for her."

=== Second marriage ===
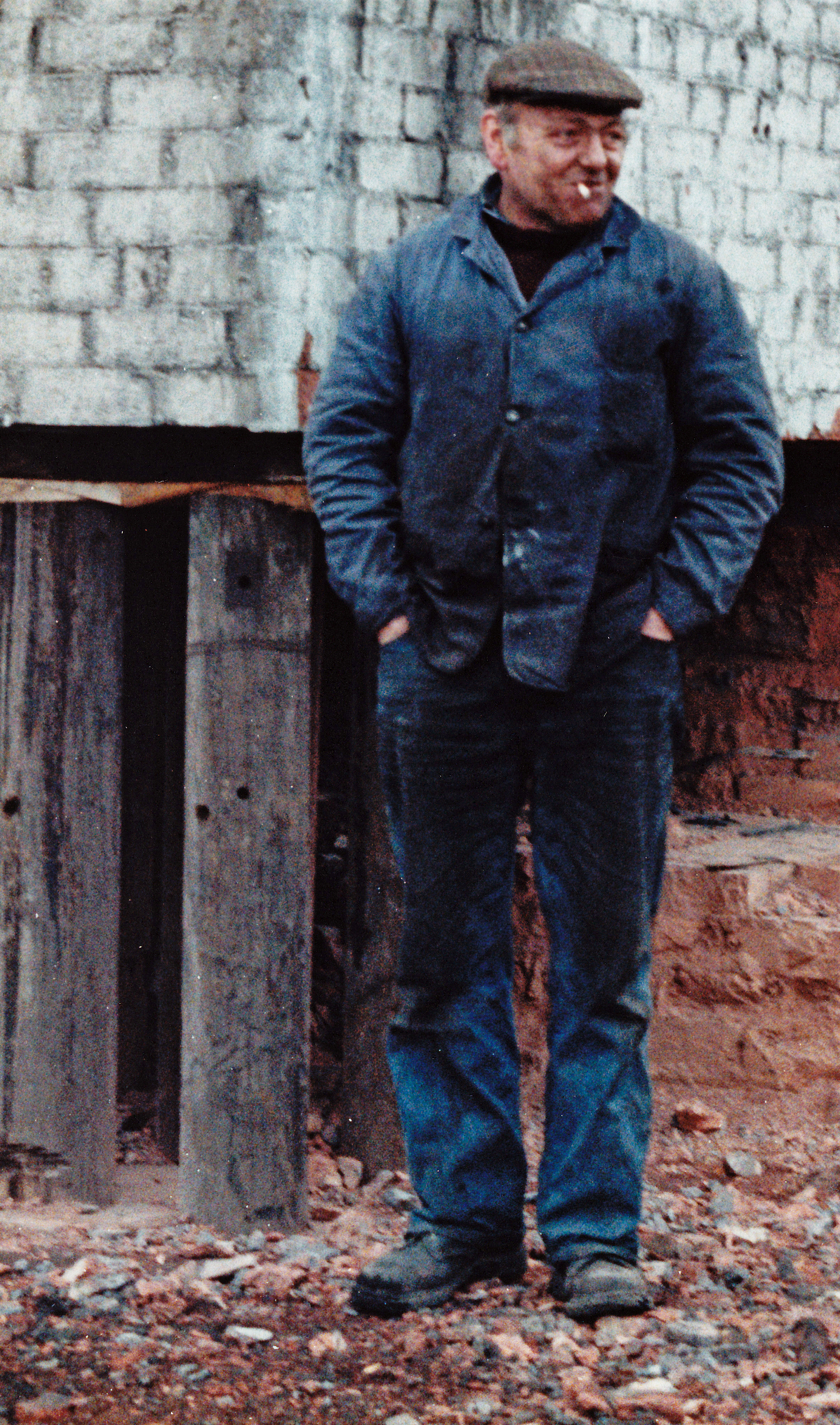
Dibnah in 1981

Dibnah met his second wife Susan Lorenz—a 28-year-old social worker—at a steam rally in Cheshire. In The Fred Dibnah Story (1996) she recalled their first meeting: "He looked sad and miserable, quite a pathetic sort of figure really, none of the bounce that people knew him for." He later invited her to a chimney felling in Oldham and then a talk he had been invited to give to a group of fans in Halifax, known as The Fred Dibnah Appreciation Society. Sue moved into Dibnah's home in Bolton and the two married on 27 February 1987. She encouraged him to grow a moustache and also to give up smoking.

Many of the chimneys around Bolton had now been either repaired, or demolished and so Dibnah was forced to travel further afield for work. He travelled to the Yorkshire Dales to install a lightning conductor on the parish church in Kirkby Malham. While digging the hole for the conductor, they uncovered human bones, for which a reinterment ceremony was held. Their first son, Jack (named after his father's trade), was born in 1987. Dibnah offered to make a weathercock, provided that his son was christened in the same church. His second son, Roger, was born in 1991.

== Later life ==
In 1996, Dibnah repaired the 262-foot (80 m) chimney at Barrow Bridge—the same chimney he had scaled for a bet, in his youth. He was also asked to install a peregrine falcon nest at the top. He was later influential in ensuring the chimney was made a listed building. As a notable raconteur, he also became an after-dinner speaker and would wear his trademark flat cap with his dinner jacket. He made an appearance in a 1996 television advertisement for Kelloggs.

However, the strain of living with a man so dedicated to his hobbies began to take its toll on his wife:

Sometimes he'll have busted his thumb because he's hit it with a hammer; you couldn't really expect him then to come in and start doing things in the house. I just don't think it's fair though, I think you've got to strike a balance and I think ours is about 90/10. Me for 90 per cent of the housework and Fred for 10.

Susan met another man and moved out, taking Roger with her and leaving Jack with Fred.

She went away from here saying, "I don't want your antiques, I don't want your house, I don't want any money," [...] But what she did do was take my lads away from me and I can't forgive her for that.

— Fred Dibnah

=== Third marriage ===
By 1997 Dibnah was living alone, with little work or money. Competition from Manchester had reduced his income from steeplejacking and filming for the BBC had dried up completely. He had, however, met Sheila Grundy, a former magician's assistant. She had arrived one day with her parents and young son to see Dibnah's back yard, and signed the visitor's book. The two remained in contact and became friends; they shared an interest in steam and Grundy was fascinated by Dibnah's tales of steeplejacking. She and her son moved in with Dibnah in 1998 and the couple married on 26 September that year. At their wedding reception in Bolton, Dibnah was surprised and moved to tears when his youngest daughter, Caroline, came to see him. Dibnah had had little contact with his daughters in the years since his divorce from Alison.

=== Television presenting ===
In 1997, Dibnah met author David Hall. Hall had been raised in the Bradford district of Manchester and the two swapped tales of growing up in the latter half of the 20th century. Hall suggested that Dibnah would be unlikely to have any further television work commissioned on his life and that he should consider becoming a television presenter. The two worked on new ideas for a programme focussed on industrial archaeology that would show Dibnah touring the country, visiting important locations of industrial heritage and speaking to the men involved in the maintenance and restoration of machinery and architecture. The programme would also exploit Dibnah's working-class attitude and show him operating some of the machinery he visited. Filming of Fred Dibnah's Industrial Age began in July 1998. The first location was near Bolton, at the Wet Earth Colliery and the crew then moved on to various locations around the country, continuing to film through the summer and autumn of 1998.

The series achieved high viewing figures, with positive reviews, and the associated website became the second most-visited BBC website at the time. A complementary book was also published and was one of the top five best-selling history books of the year. Dibnah admitted he found speaking to a camera more nerve-racking than climbing a chimney, but the success of Fred Dibnah's Industrial Age was a portent; he later presented several other television series. Before filming began for Fred Dibnah's Magnificent Monuments, he had installed his red ladders on the steeple at St Walburge's in Preston, ready for an inspection. With filming for television now taking up much of his time, however, he was unable to complete the job. He left the ladders at the church for several years and donated them to the tradesman who eventually took the job.

== Last years ==
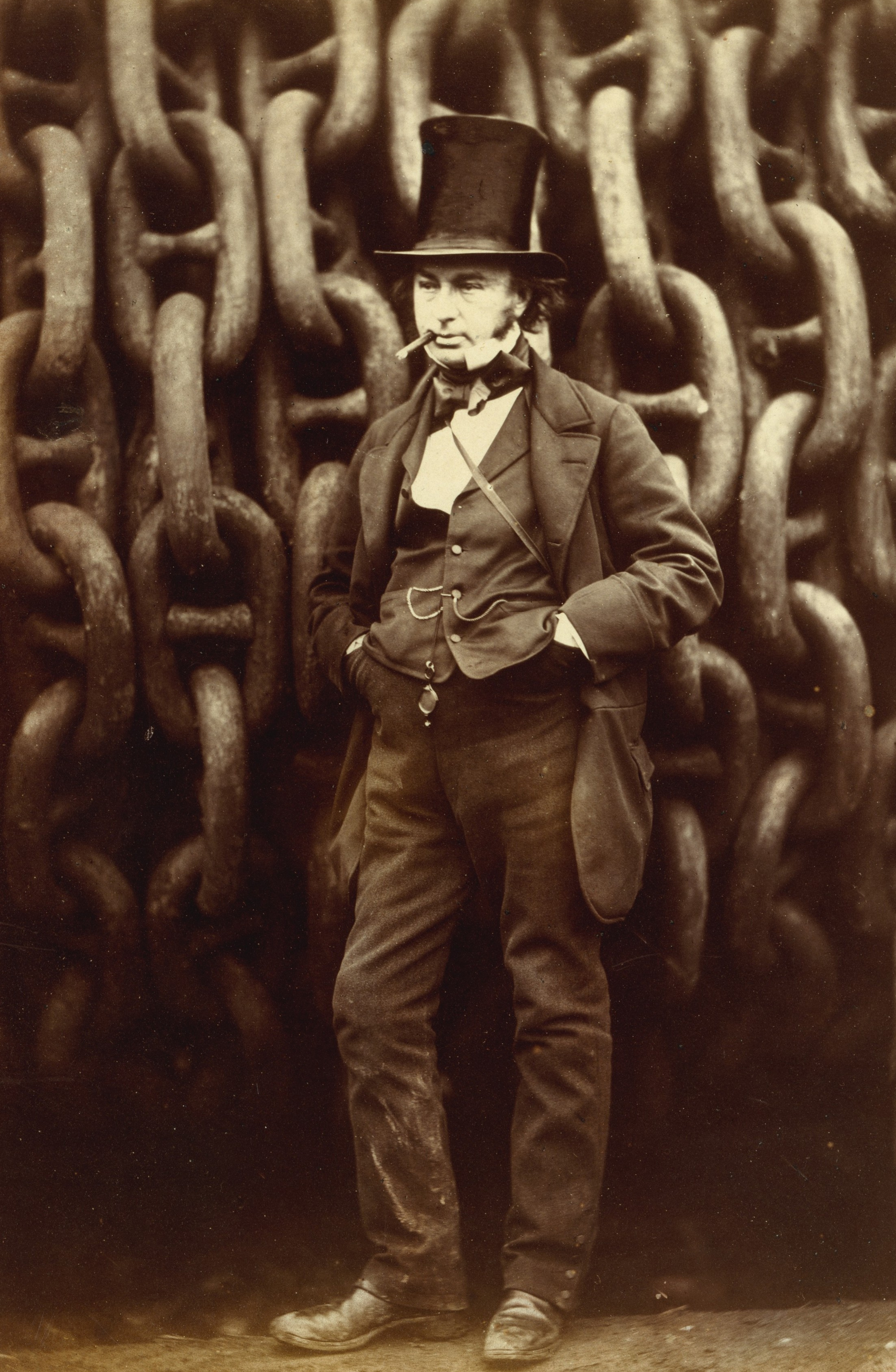
Isambard Kingdom Brunel was much admired by Dibnah.

In 2001, to mark the centenary of the death of Queen Victoria, the BBC transmitted a season of programmes based on a Victorian theme and Dibnah presented Fred Dibnah's Victorian Heroes. He had long been fascinated by the Victorians, especially Isambard Kingdom Brunel, who was his hero. During filming he visited a number of locations, including the 245-foot (75 m) high Clifton Suspension Bridge and the slipway for the SS Great Eastern.

=== Illness ===
In early 2001, Dibnah was due to begin filming Fred Dibnah's Building of Britain, but suffered severe abdominal pains and was admitted to hospital for tests. He was discharged and began filming at locations around the country, including the Globe Theatre, Ely Cathedral and Glamis Castle. Dibnah was the chairman of the Manchester Bolton & Bury Canal Society and an episode on the construction of Britain's canal network was therefore of particular interest to him. Toward the end of filming, Dibnah went to Bolton Royal Hospital for a check-up, where a tumour was found on his right kidney. The kidney was removed and the tumour was found to be malignant. He went to Christie Hospital in Manchester, where further growths were discovered around his bladder. On the same day, Sheila's father fell from the roof of his house and died. Dibnah underwent chemotherapy and once his treatment was finished, tests showed that he was free of cancer.

Filming for Fred Dibnah's Age of Steam began early in 2003, at the Trencherfield Mill, near Wigan Pier. The film crew visited a number of locations, including a steam rally in Cornwall and the Bluebell Railway in Sussex. Dibnah was travelling around the country working on a subject that fascinated him, visiting old friends and making money from his hobby. The restoration of his traction engine was almost complete; later that year, however, Dibnah had another checkup at Christie Hospital and was told that a large tumour had been found on his bladder.

=== Dig with Dibnah ===
Dibnah had another course of chemotherapy, but this time the treatment was unsuccessful. Undeterred, he began to dig a replica coal mine in the back garden of his home. Although the sight of pithead gear may have been considered by his neighbours to be unusual, as a child raised in Bolton, he had been surrounded by pits such as Ladyshore Colliery and had long harboured an interest in mining. He had already assembled the wooden pithead gear and was planning to sink a 100-foot (30 m) brick-lined shaft below this into the hillside. At the bottom of the shaft, a horizontal tunnel would have led out to the steep side of the valley above which his garden sits.

The intention was to have a narrow gauge railway running along the tunnel, back up the hillside on a rope-hauled inclined plane, returning to the pithead. The ultimate aim was to be able to demonstrate the basic working of an early colliery. Seven years before his diagnosis, therefore, Dibnah had sourced drawings of suitable pithead gear and built a frame from timber and iron bolts. He had applied for and was given planning permission to erect the structure, but made no mention of his wish to dig a shaft underneath it. The BBC decided to make a documentary on Dibnah's proposed mine, which would entail his travelling once again around the country, visiting working collieries and heritage mines. Filming started late in 2003, by which time Dibnah and his friend Alf Molyneux had already made a start on the shaft.

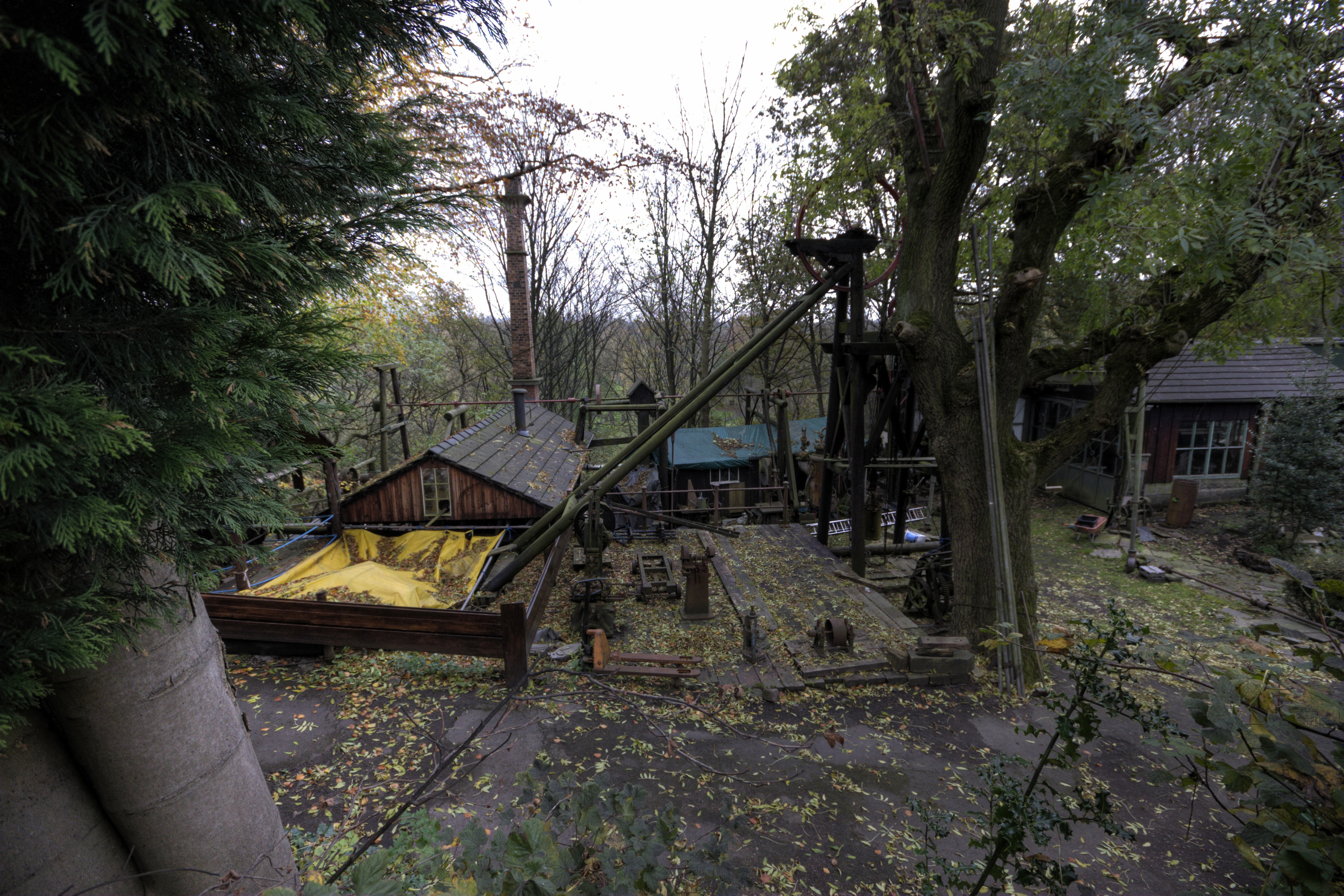
The pithead gear at the rear of the Fred Dibnah Heritage Centre, previously Dibnah's home

Using traditional shaft-sinking techniques and the labour of mining friends Alf Molyneux and Jimmy Crooks, the shaft was sunk to a depth of 20 feet (6.1 m) and lined with brick. The work had been undertaken without planning permission and, when the council eventually found out what was happening, they insisted he apply for planning permission.

Following the sale of Dibnah's property, the headgear was acquired by James Palmer of Hindley Green, a lifelong fan of Dibnah, for The Lancashire Mining Museum, where it stands today, funded by Stephen Eckersley .

Palmer says that the day he visited Dibnah's House to save the headgear from going to Cumbria was an important day for Dibnah's Legacy, as it should stay in Lancashire.

Palmer dismantled the headgear along with Fred fan and friend Jack Bracegirdle ready for transportation to the LMM.

=== Fred Dibnah's Made in Britain ===
Despite Dibnah's best efforts, planning permission was refused. Although he appealed against the decision, a new series diverted his attention. At the end of 2003 production began for Fred Dibnah's Made in Britain. With his friend, Alf Molyneux, Dibnah would tour the country on his completed traction engine, visiting the workshops that still could produce the parts needed for his antique vehicle. His engine, however, was not yet complete and Dibnah's medical diagnosis was not good: he knew he had only a short time to live. His traction engine developed a serious fault, but with the help of friends, it was quickly repaired and its restoration completed.

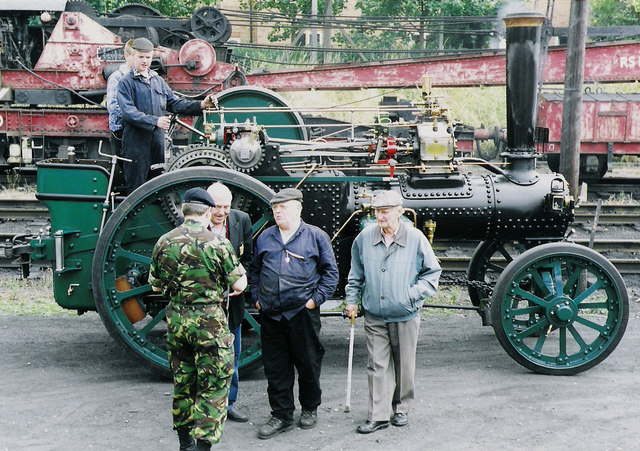
Dibnah visiting the Great Central Railway works at Loughborough, as part of his final televised tour of Britain's industrial heritage

In December 2003, his traction engine was now in working order and planning for the new series commenced. Dibnah's illness necessitated that he sleep in hotels, rather than the living van the engine would tow during the trip. For the long distances between locations, the engine would be transported on the back of a low loader. Dibnah's engine suffered early mechanical problems; it could barely tow the fully loaded living van uphill, as the cylinder had been placed very slightly closer to the footplate than it should have been. As a result of this, every time the piston was fully forward it covered the steam inlet port. The engine was repaired, and with some minor repair work to one of the pistons, was brought up to full power. The team was joined by Dibnah's sons, Jack and Roger.

The production crew made every effort to reduce Dibnah's workload. Changes were made to the filming schedule, to allow Dibnah more time to rest at home between filming days. The crew visited the Forth Road Bridge and Dibnah became the first man to drive a traction engine under its own steam across the bridge. Such pleasures provided a welcome distraction for Dibnah, who was by then ill and in pain. By the end of June, he was so ill, he could not continue filming. He was sent home to rest and given medication to alleviate his condition, so that he could collect his MBE.

Filming continued at various locations around the country, with sons Jack and Roger, who had become essential members of the tour, providing much-needed support for their father. By the end of July, the crew had filmed only 34 days with Dibnah, out of a planned 60. It was becoming more difficult by the day for Dibnah to fulfil his filming duties and the crew decided to cut short the schedule. Once home, Dibnah decided to creosote the pithead gear in his garden, but fell and injured his back. He was adamant that he would continue filming, however, and made the trip to North Wales to complete filming. He later made a partial recovery and completed his last days filming at an Ironworks in Atherton.

=== Recognition and honours ===
On 1 December 1991 Dibnah was the Castaway on Desert Island Discs .

In 2000, Dibnah was awarded an honorary degree of Doctor of Technology for his achievement in engineering, by Robert Gordon University in Aberdeen.

In the 2004 New Year Honours Dibnah was appointed a Member of the Order of the British Empire for services to heritage and broadcasting. He said "I'm looking forward to meeting the Queen but I shall probably have to get a new cap. And I'd like to meet Prince Charles because we share the same views about modern architecture".

On 7 July 2004, Dibnah went to Buckingham Palace to receive his award from the Queen. He said later: I was slightly nervous shaking hands with the Queen. She asked me if I was still climbing chimneys. It beats me how she keeps tabs on everybody. I never thought I would be receiving an MBE.

He initially planned to drive his traction engine into the palace grounds, but was refused as the Royal Parks Agency feared that its weight would damage the surface of The Mall. Eventually, he was allowed to drive the engine to Wellington Barracks, a short distance from the palace. He collected his medal wearing morning dress and a top hat.

On 19 July 2004, he was made an honorary Doctor of the university by the University of Birmingham.

=== Death ===
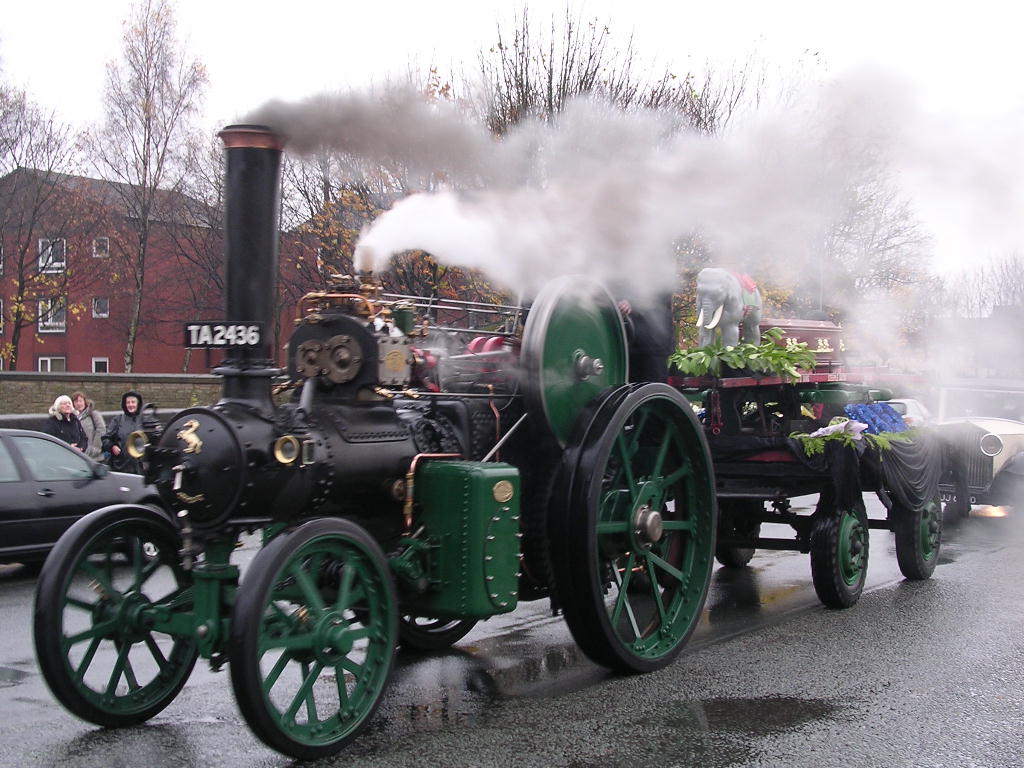
Dibnah's coffin being drawn along the streets of Bolton

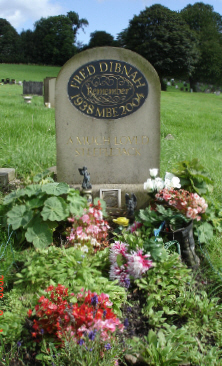
Fred Dibnah's grave in Tonge Cemetery

Dibnah died on 6 November 2004, after suffering from cancer for three years. He was 66 years old.

Eleven days later, thousands of mourners watched as Dibnah's coffin (on top of which his trademark flat cap was placed) was towed through the centre of Bolton by his restored traction engine, driven by his son. A cortège of steam-powered vehicles followed, as the procession made its way to Bolton Parish Church. During the hour-long service, David Hall told the congregation "He wasn't a posh TV presenter. He was recognised as a working man who had learned through experience." Following the service, led by the Vicar of Bolton, Canon Michael Williams (a friend of Dibnah), he was buried at Tonge Cemetery, behind his home.

Dibnah changed his will two weeks before his death. He left everything, about £1 million, to his five children from two previous marriages. His last wife Sheila, who was 20 years his junior, subsequently applied to the High Court in a claim for half of the estate, on the basis of "reasonable provision" and the estate eventually reached a settlement.

== Legacy ==
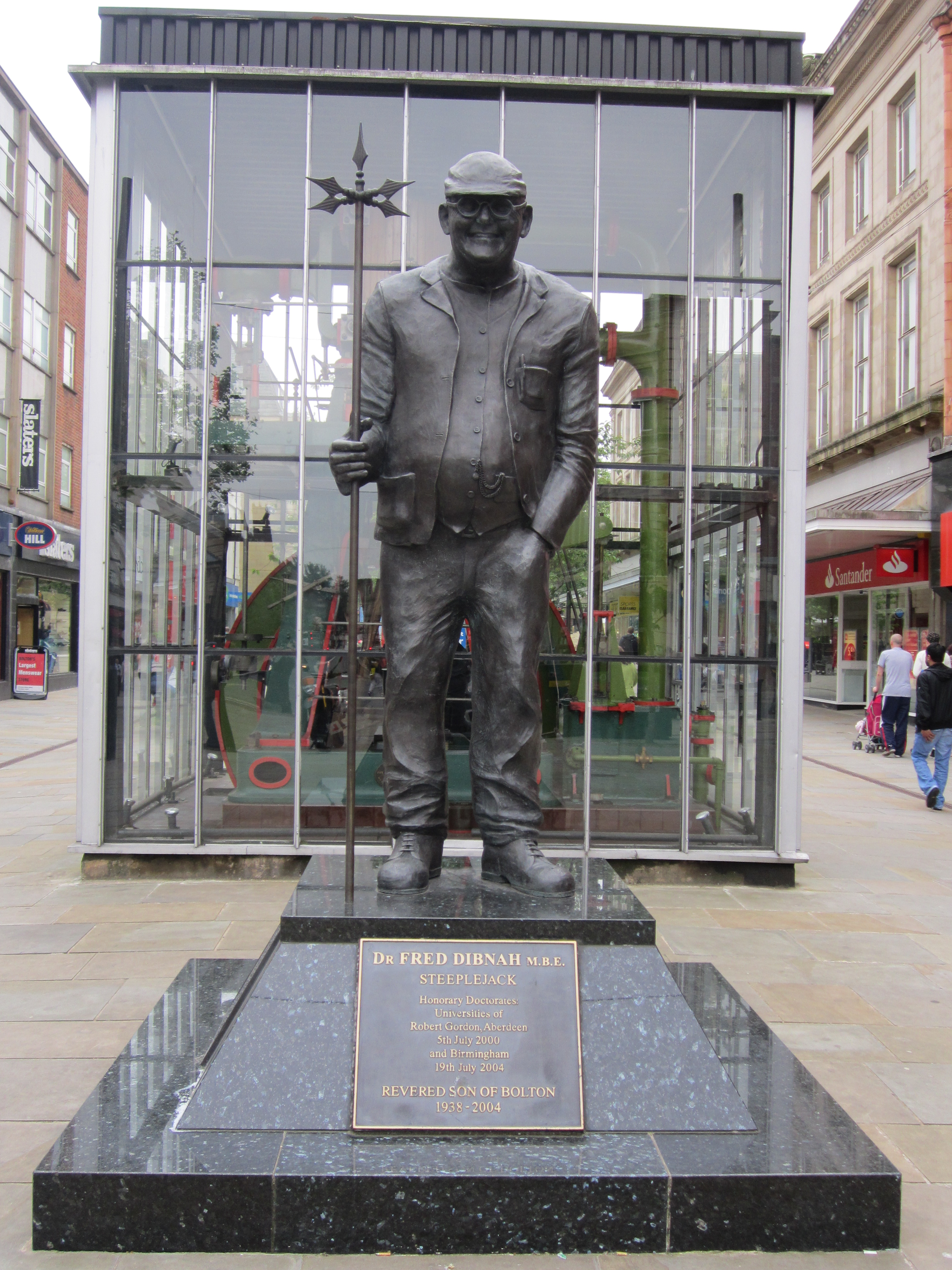
Statue of Dibnah in Bolton

Through his television work Dibnah became famous for felling chimneys (he felled 90 in his lifetime), although it was one of his least favourite jobs. As he made more films with Don Haworth, his outspoken views on changing society, work ethics and delinquency, made him the embodiment of the views of many of his fans and epitomised the view of a northern working man.

Dibnah was praised by many notable British people. After reporting on his death, television presenter Peter Sissons remarked: "They don't make them like that any more". Comedian Peter Kay said: "It's very sad news. He was one of a kind and now he has gone I think there will be no one else like him. He was enthusiastic about a way of life that has virtually disappeared now." Brian Tetlow, chairman of the Bolton and District Civic Trust, said: "He's unique, not just to Bolton but to Britain and the world. Our thoughts are with his wife and children."

An 8-foot (2.4 m) bronze statue of Dibnah was unveiled by the Mayor of Bolton, in Bolton town centre, on 29 April 2008. The sculpture was created by Jane Robbins. His home was converted into a heritage centre in 2010 but its contents were sold at auction in March 2018.

A play titled The Demolition Man, based on his final years, was staged in 2011 at Bolton's Octagon Theatre.

The life and times of Dibnah were celebrated by St Helens comedy folk band the Lancashire Hotpots, who released their song "Dibnah" with a music video in 2016. Band member Dickie Ticker said of Dibnah "When Fred came on the screens – other than on Coronation Street – there was no one with a broad Boltonian accent. He was a working class and genuinely nice bloke. Since posting the video we have had dozens and dozens of comments and no one has got a bad word to say about him."

The American rock band Tuff Sunshine released a song, "The Steeplejack" in 2019 that had been inspired by the 1979 BBC documentary Fred Dibnah: Steeplejack.

== Publications ==
- Dibnah, Fred, and Donoghue, Paul, Fred Dibnah, Memories of a Steeplejack, book and dvd, published by W. H. Smith, 2007

== Filmography ==
- Fred Dibnah: Steeplejack (1979)
- Fred (1982)
- Fred – A Disappearing World (1983)
- A Year with Fred (1987)
- A Year with Fred – New Horizons (1991)
- Fred Dibnah – Getting Steamed Up (1991)
- Life With Fred (1994)
- Fred Dibnah's The Ups and Downs of Chimneys (1994)
- Fred Dibnah's All Steamed Up (1994)
- Fred Dibnah Getting Steam Up (1995)
- The Fred Dibnah Story (1996)
- Fred Dibnah's Industrial Age (1999)
- Fred Dibnah's Magnificent Monuments (2000)
- Fred Dibnah's Victorian Heroes (2001)
- Fred Dibnah's Building of Britain (2002)
- Fred Dibnah's Age of Steam (2003)
- Dig with Dibnah (2004)
- A Tribute to Fred Dibnah (2004)
- Fred Dibnah's Made in Britain (2005)
- Fred Dibnah's World of Steam, Steel and Stone (2006)

== Notes ==
108 Fred's ladder makes an appearance on a chimney in Brass episode 13
