= Anaïs Duplan =

American writer (born 1992)

Anaïs Duplan (born 1992) is a queer and trans Haitian writer now based in the U.S., with three book publications from Action Books, Black Ocean Press, and Brooklyn Arts Press, along with a chapbook from Monster House Press. His work has been honored by a Whiting Award and a Marian Goodman fellowship from Independent Curators International. He is a Professor of postcolonial literature at Bennington College, of which he is also an alum.

== Early life and education ==
Duplan was born in Jacmel, Haiti. He moved to the United States as a child and grew up in Boston and Brooklyn with his mother. His writing about his father's absence from his childhood and how it impacted his understanding of gender norms was published in The Paris Review, and he discussed his parents' impact on his work in an interview with The Rumpus. He also lived in Cuba for several years. Eventually, after attending Rhode Island School of Design, Duplan graduated from Bennington College in 2014 and then the Iowa Writers' Workshop in 2017.

== Career ==
Duplan's poetry publications include the book Take This Stallion, published in 2016 by Brooklyn Arts Press, which Publishers Weekly wrote in a review "tactfully manages to stir the comical and casual into poems about pain, crippling emotional uncertainty, substance abuse, and death," and I Need Music, published in 2021 by Action Books. The latter received praise from poets Jericho Brown, Major Jackson, and Shane McCrae, as well as positive reviews from Literary Hub and Make. In 2016 his poem My Heart Like a Needle Ever True Turns to the Maid of Ebon Hue caught the attention of PBS, because of its focus on Civil War spy Mary Bowser. In June 2021, Duplan was the guest editor for the Academy of American Poets's Poem-a-Day series.

Duplan's 2017 chapbook, Mount Carmel & the Blood of Parnassus was inspired by his parents and how they have affected his work.

Duplan's first nonfiction book, Blackspace: On the Poetics of an Afrofuture, was published by Black Ocean Press in 2020 after excerpts were published in Ploughshares and Hyperallergic. The nonfiction book discusses the meanings of transition and passing in regard to gender, including the irreversible effects of testosterone therapy. Claudia Rankine listed it as a book she looked forward to reading in an interview with The New York Times, Hanif Abdurraqib called it "futuristic work," and a review in Colorado Review noted that its style is "as much theoretical as it is journalistic as it is in the style of manifesto." In 2022, Duplan received a Whiting Award for nonfiction, which NPR noted was a predictor of writers who would go on to become "household names." Duplan's outfit at the award reception caught the attention of Vanity Fair which described it as a "spectacular jumpsuit."

In 2016, Duplan founded the Center for Afrofuturist Studies, an artist residency program developed to give artists of color arts space after a fundraiser on Kickstarter. The first artists-in-residence while Duplan served as director were Yulan Grant, Terrence Nance, Krista Franklin. In 2021, the center started new collaborations with Iowa City, including murals, interviews, and performances. While at Iowa, Duplan met Tracie Morris, when they "both presented talks at Columbia University's More Than A Manifesto conference", and she later interviewed him about black sociality, academia, and influences for The Los Angeles Review of Books. Duplan was also interviewed for the New York City Trans Oral History Project, in conjunction with New York Public Library's oral history project. He has been teaching at Bennington College, his alma mater, since 2021.

Since 2022 Duplan had been working as a guest curator at the Museum Folkwang in Essen, Germany. He was responsible for the development of the exhibition chapter on "Afrofuturism" as part of the exhibition "We is Future - Visions of New Communities." The museum terminated the contract around a week before the opening on 24 November 2023 because of his Pro-Palestine posts. The museum justified the move by saying that Duplan had published several anti-Semitic posts on his Instagram account in the preceding weeks. The museum spokesperson cites Duplan's November 10 post calling for support for the BDS movement, as what made them make that decision.

== List of works ==
=== Books ===
- Take This Stallion (Brooklyn Art Press, 2016)
- Blackspace: On the Poetics of an Afrofuture (Black Ocean, 2020)
- I Need Music (Action Books, 2021)

=== Chapbooks ===
- Mount Carmel and the Blood of Parnassus (Monster House Press, 2017)

=== Exhibitions ===
- INNTERDISCPLINE, Friends and Lovers, Brooklyn, NY, 2019
- Anonymous Donor, Figge Art Museum, Davenport, Iowa, 2019
- We Turn, EFA Project Space, New York, NY, 2021
- We is Future (cancelled), Museum Folkwang, Essen, Germany, 2023

== Honors and awards ==
- 2021 – QUEER|ART|PRIZE
- 2021 – Marian Goodman Fellowship
- 2022 – Whiting Award
- 2022 – Black Visionaries Award from Instagram and the Brooklyn Museum
