= Living van =

Towed temporary living quarters

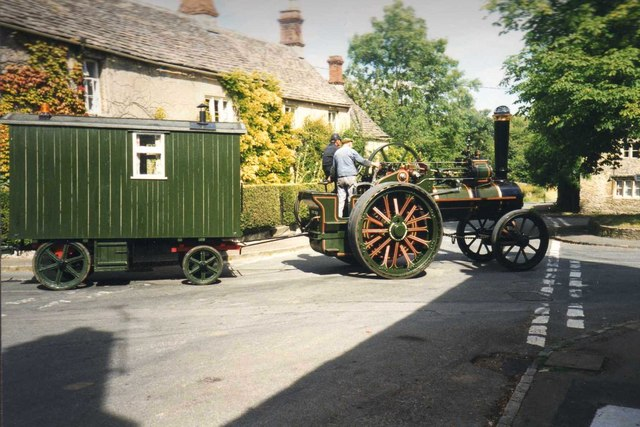
Traction engine with living van

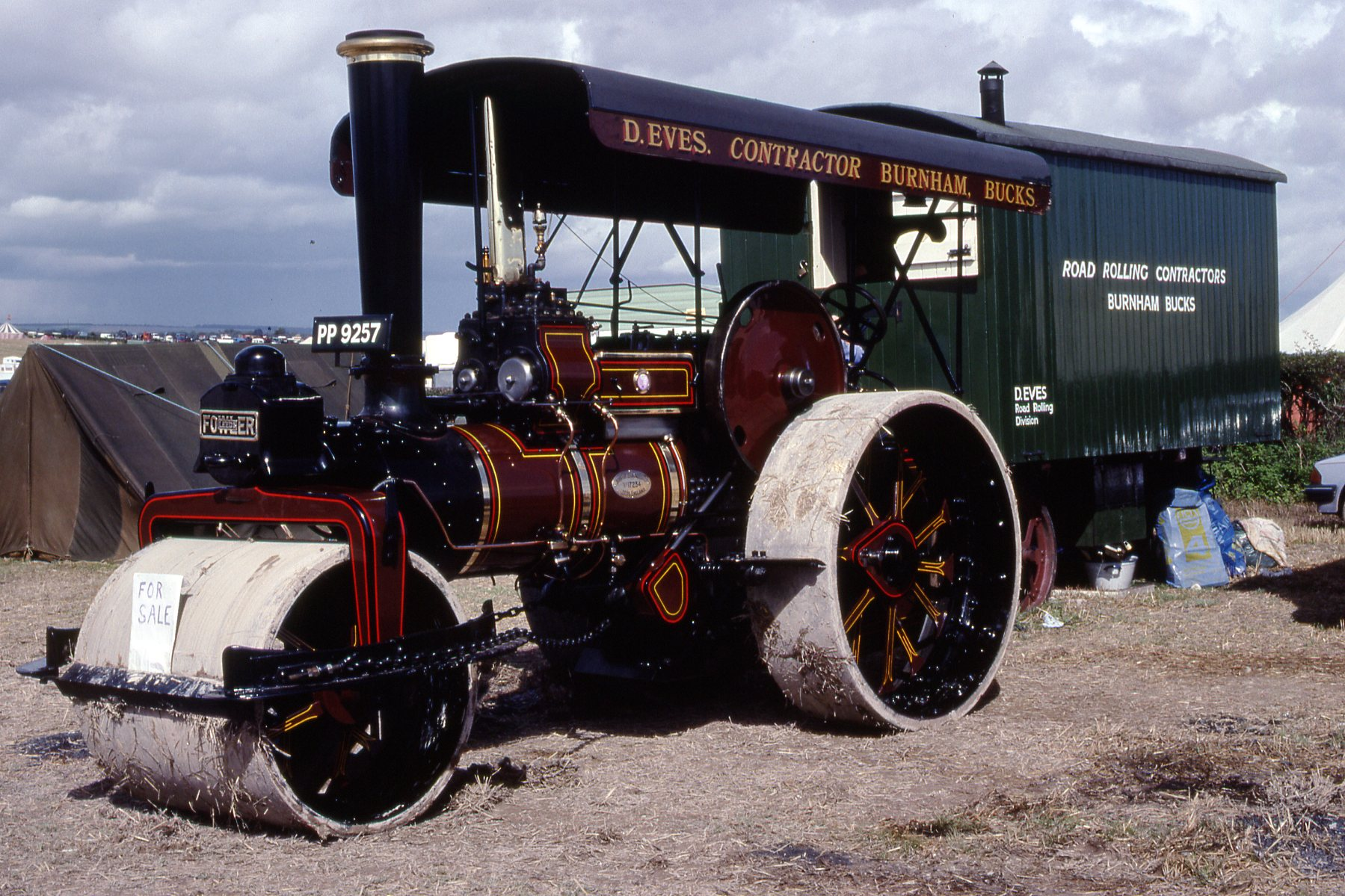
Steam road roller with its living van (1992)

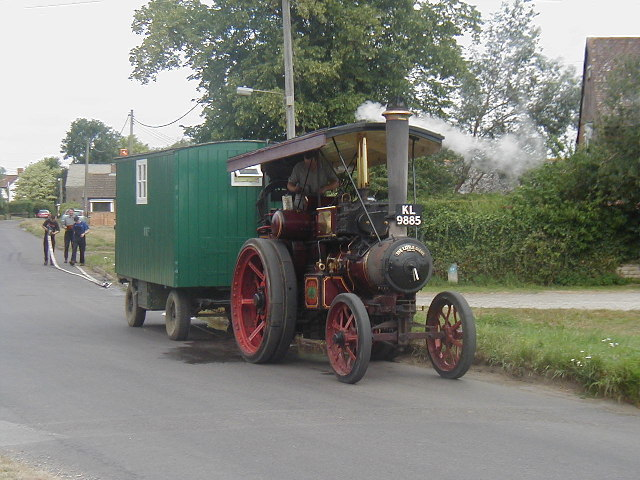
Living van with pneumatic tyres

A living van is a portable caravan for temporary use of traveling work crews, especially of early steam engines. Living vans developed from the earlier shepherd's wagons, used to provide portable accommodation following a flock as they were moved between pastures.

== Historic overview ==
Traction engines in the Victorian period represented an expensive capital investment in the latest agricultural technology of the period. Many were owned by contractors who would move them from farm to farm for hire, as required. Typical work included threshing after harvest time. A rake of engine, threshing machine, a living van and often a water wagon (Note: The main arable areas in the UK for cereal crops are in East Anglia and are also relatively arid.) would travel from farm to farm as needed, stopping at each for a few days.

The first engines, from around 1840, were horse-drawn portable engines. From the 1860s the locomotive traction engine appeared, now capable of moving under its own power.

The engine's crew would include a driver, a steersman, and often a boy. Other agricultural labourers carrying out the threshing work would already be resident on the farm. (Note: A full team might be eight or nine people) Threshing an average-sized farm of 50 acres (20 ha) would take about two weeks, so the capital cost of the investment in an engine and 'drum' (Note: The threshing machine was known as a 'drum' or 'box', sometimes a 'mill' in Scotland.) encouraged farms to purchase such a rig as a jointly shared investment, or for others to establish themselves as itinerant contractors. Threshing would continue after harvest and into the winter, with the corn stacked in ricks until then.

The first locomotive threshing teams were local and did not require living vans, the driver walking or cycling from home up to ten miles (16 km). Use of vans did not become widespread for threshing until the 1880s, some years after they were popular for ploughing.

Larger engines, working in pairs, were also used as ploughing engines. These too were itinerant and would pull a living van and the balance plough behind them. Ploughing teams travelled longer distances, with living vans, from their outset.

In his last TV series, Fred Dibnah's Made in Britain, Fred Dibnah travelled around industrial Britain with his traction engine drawing its living van — although, owing to his advanced illness, he was no longer able to live in it.

== Construction ==
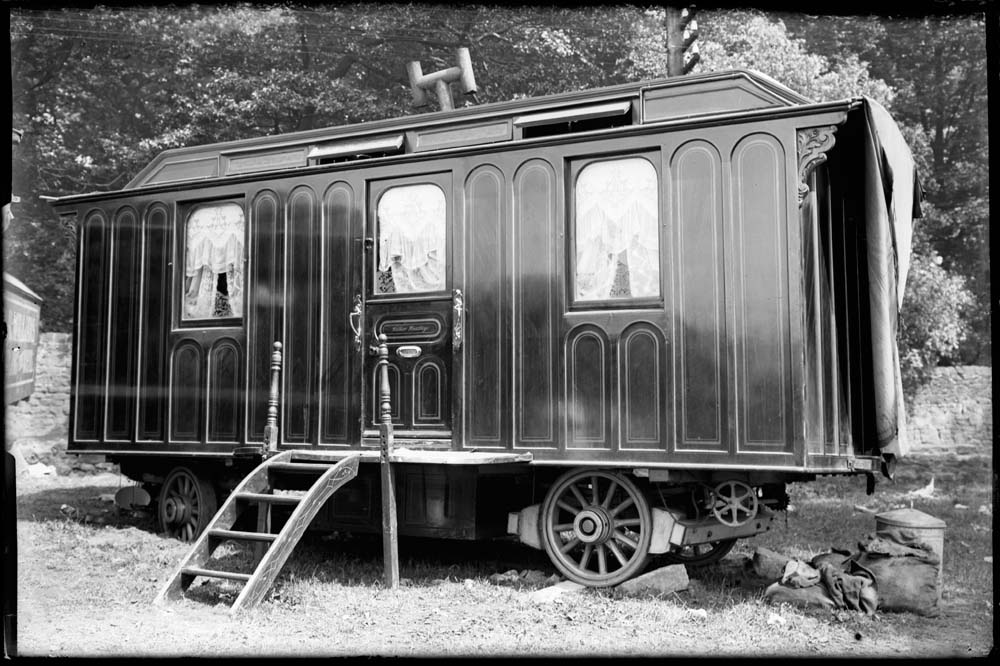
Walker Hoadley's living wagon, at The Hoppings on the Newcastle Town Moor, c. 1938

The vans were constructed of wood, usually vertically matchboard panelled, on a wooden chassis. Traditionally they were painted dark green outside, white inside for lightness. The roof was curved, of canvas over a wooden frame. This would be tarred or treated as oilcloth for weatherproofing. Shepherd's wagons were often of corrugated iron, although this does not seem to have been used for wagons that were regularly towed on roads. Some small windows were provided, for light and ventilation and often too high for a view out. They had a four-wheel chassis, the front axle having simple single-pivot platform steering. Steering followed the drawbar from the engine, rather than being steered. Distinctively from earlier horse-drawn wagons, no driver's position was needed at their front. There were no brakes fitted, although wheel chocks were always carried.

Wheels were of cast iron, sometimes wooden artillery or cart wheels for early examples. Fowler, builders of ploughing engines, built riveted steel-spoked wheels, as for the engines themselves. Their large vans differed distinctively from other makers in numerous details: side doors rather than rear, horizontal panelling and also common use of a clerestory window above. Later vans, from around 1900, carried solid rubber tyres. Modern examples have sometimes been refitted with pneumatic tyres. Living vans for steam roller gangs on road construction began using pneumatic tyres in the 1930s, to avoid damage to newly-laid asphalt.

Living vans often included a coal stove for heating and cooking, depending on the seasonal nature of their work. Otherwise a paraffin stove would be used for cooking. Unlike railway locomotives, the engine's own firebox was rarely used for cooking 'on the shovel' as it was too cramped and also provided no way to make a first cup of tea in the morning, before lighting up.

== Showman's wagons ==
Agricultural living vans were plain, even when occupied by owner drivers. In contrast, showmen became known for their opulent and beautifully decorated wagons. These were distinguished by cut glass windows, lace curtains and even more engraved glass inside fronting display cabinets for china, ideally Royal Crown Derby.

Showman's wagons are sought after today and are still used by new circus families.

== See also ==
- Wagon
