= Colin Winnette =

American writer (born 1984)

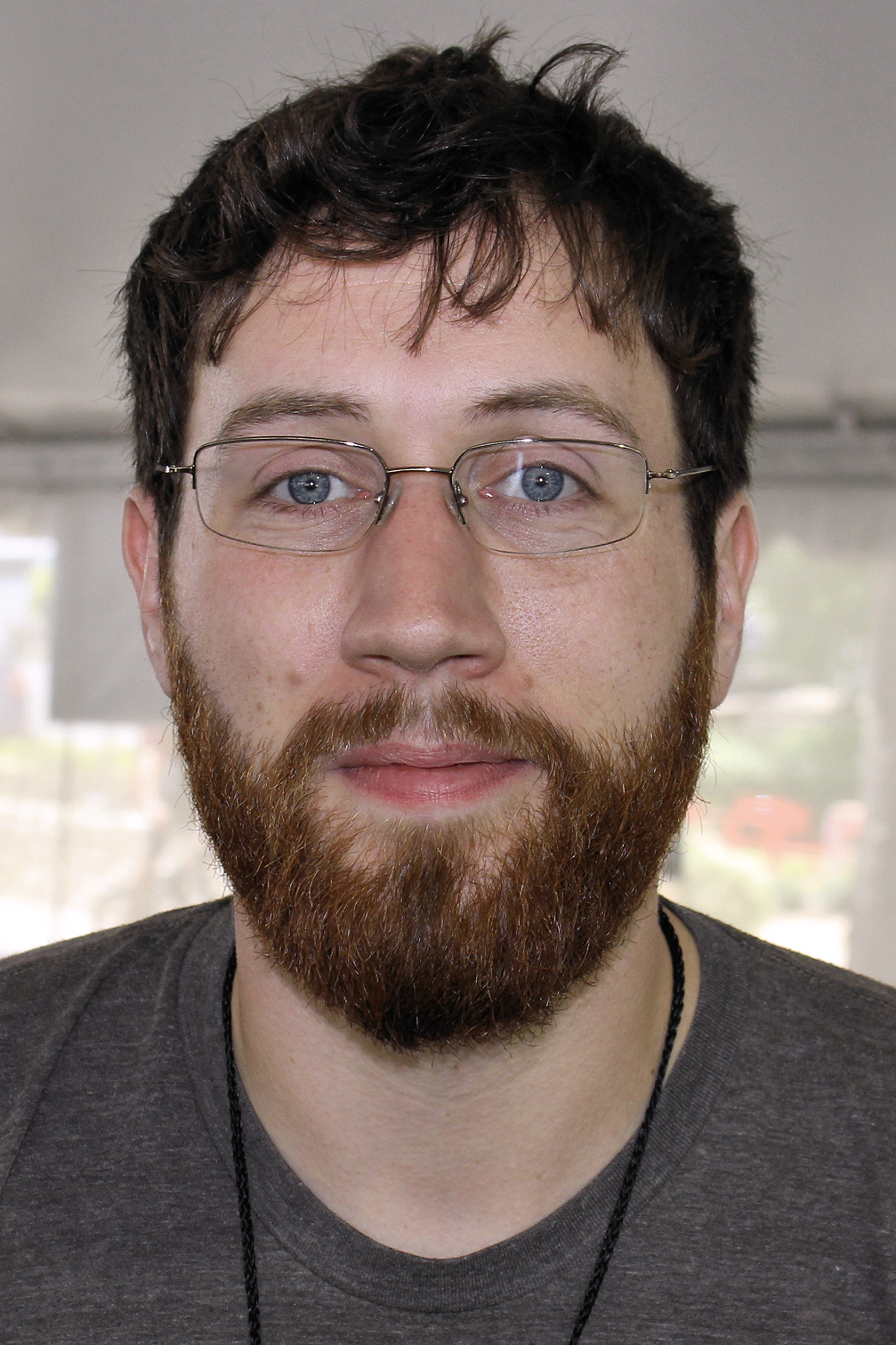
- Winnette at the 2015 Texas Book Festival
- Born: 12/1984
- Occupation: Author
- Website: colinwinnette.net

Colin Winnette is an American novelist, short story writer, and poet.

== Early life and education ==
Winnette grew up in Denton, Texas. He attended the School of the Art Institute of Chicago, where he earned an MFA in writing in 2012.

== Career ==
Winnette's first novel, Revelation, was published in 2011 by Mutable Sound Press while he was a graduate student. He has written five more works of fiction: Animal Collection (Spork Press 2012), Fondly (Atticus Books 2013), Coyote (Les Figues Press 2015), Haints Stay (Two Dollar Radio 2015), The Job of the Wasp (Soft Skull Press 2018), and Users (Soft Skull Press 2023).

Winnette's short stories, poetry, reviews and other compositions have appeared in various publications, including McSweeney's, The American Reader, The Believer, Gulf Coast Magazine, and 9th Letter. He was the winner of Les Figues Press's 2013 NOS Book Contest, for his novel Coyote. He also won the 2012 Sonora Review's Short Short Fiction Award and Heavy Feather Review's Featured Chapbook Contest, and he was a finalist for the Cleveland State University Poetry Center's First Book Award and Gulf Coast Magazine's Donald Barthelme Prize.

His novels have been translated into Italian and French.
