= Anselm Berrigan =

American writer

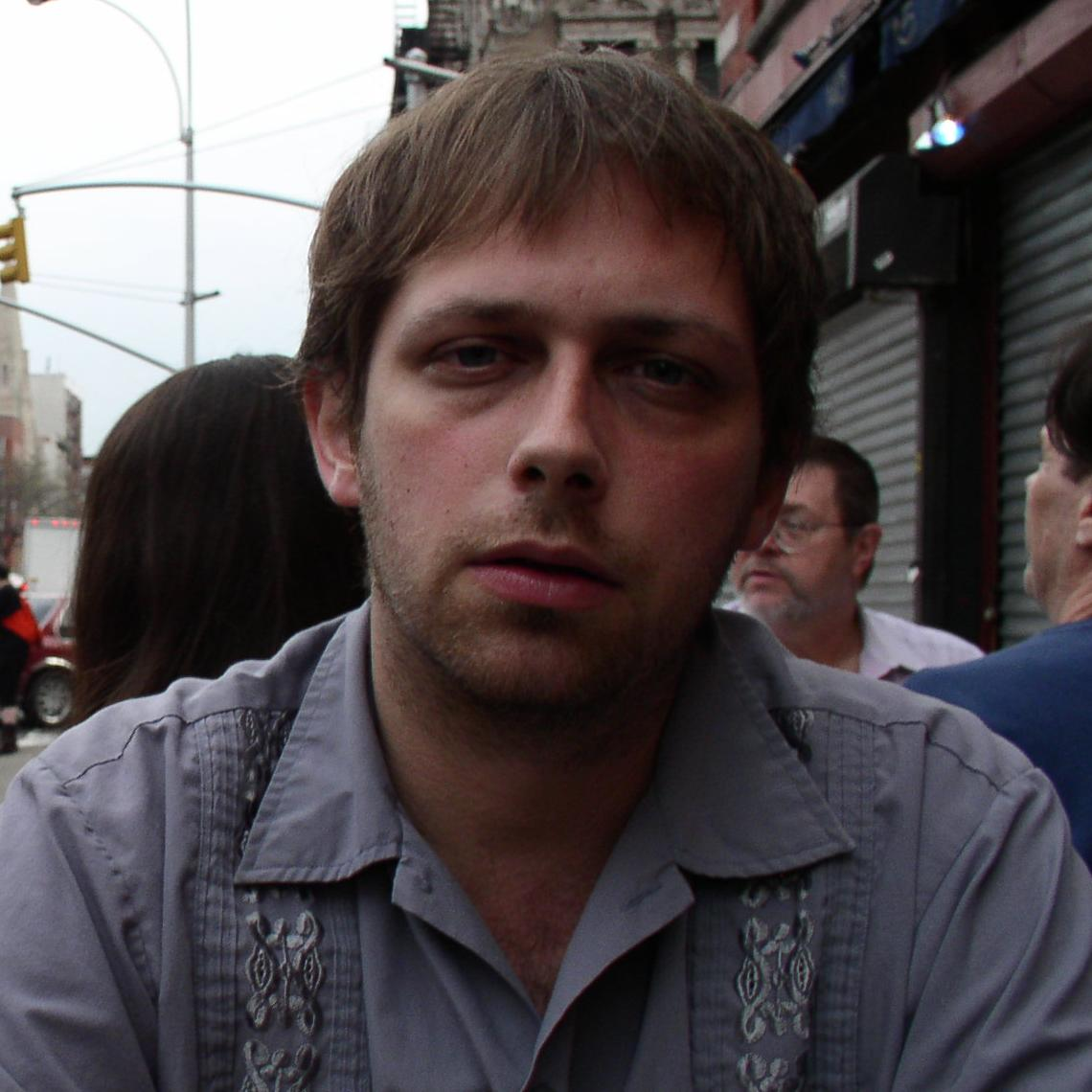
- Berrigan in 2005
- Born: Anselm Berrigan; 1972 (age 53–54); Chicago, Illinois, US
- Occupations: Poet, Teacher
- Spouse: Karen Weiser

Anselm Berrigan (born 1972) is an American poet and teacher.

== Life and work ==
Anselm Berrigan grew up in New York City, where he currently resides with his wife, poet Karen Weiser. From 2003 to 2007, he served as artistic director at the St. Mark's Poetry Project. He is the brother of poet and musician Edmund Berrigan, half-brother of Kate Berrigan and medical researcher and US National Cancer Institute David Berrigan, son of poets Alice Notley and the late Ted Berrigan, and stepson of the late English poet and prose writer Douglas Oliver.

Berrigan lived in Buffalo, New York at the "Ranch" and was known as "Anton" in San Francisco, California. He is a co-chair of the writing program at the Bard College summer MFA program and an adjunct teacher at Brooklyn College. He has also taught writing at Wesleyan University, Rutgers University, Pratt Institute and the Jack Kerouac School of Disembodied Poetics at Naropa. His newest works are a book-length poem called Notes From Irrelevance (2011), Sure Shot (2013), and Loading (2013), which was done in collaboration with artist Jonathan Allen.

Berrigan received a Foundation for Contemporary Arts Grants to Artists award in 2017.

== Bibliography ==
- They Beat Me Over the Head With a Sack, a chapbook published in 1998.
- Integrity & Dramatic Life. , a full-length collection published by Edge Books in 1999.
- Zero Star Hotel, a full-length collection published by Edge Books in 2002.
- "Pictures for Private Devotion", a CD (reading poems/no music/ narrow house), released in 2003.
- Some Notes on My Programming, a full-length collection published in 2006.
- Have a Good One, a chapbook published in 2008.
- To Hell With Sleep, a perfect-bound chapbook published in 2009.
- Free Cell published by City Lights in 2009. ISBN 978-0-87286-502-0.
- Notes From Irrelevance (Wave Books, 2011)
- Sure Shot by Overpass Books in 2013.
- LOADING with Jonathan E. Allen by Brooklyn Arts Press in 2013. ISBN 978-1-936767-28-1.
- Primitive State published by Edge Books in 2015 (with a cover by painter Marley Freeman).
- Get the Money!: Collected Prose (1961-1983), a collection of prose published by City Lights Books. 09/13/2022. ISBN 9780872868953.
- Something for Everybody, published in 2018 by Wave Books Seattle and New York

== Notes ==
- Robert Creeley; et al., eds. (2002). The Best American Poetry 2002. Scribner Poetry. ISBN 0-7432-0386-0.
- Lyn Hejinian; et al., eds. (2004). The Best American Poetry 2004. Scribner Poetry. ISBN 0-7432-5737-5.
