= Brian Blanchfield =

American poet and essayist

Brian Blanchfield is an American poet and essayist.

== Early life and education ==
He was born in Winston-Salem, North Carolina in 1973, and graduated from the University of North Carolina at Chapel Hill and Warren Wilson College. He is the author of two books of poetry, Not Even Then (2004) and A Several World (2014), and a book of essays/autobiography, Proxies (2016).

== Writings ==
A Several World was the 2014 recipient of the James Laughlin Award and was a longlist finalist for the National Book Award. The book takes its title from a 17th-century poem by Robert Herrick, and deals with questions about subjectivity and individuality versus the collective. Proxies is a collection of 24 single-subject essays that concludes with a 21-page rolling endnote, "Correction." In a starred review, Publishers Weekly noted that "in each entry Blanchfield picks a subject—foot washing, authorship, owls—and examines it from several angles until the connection between metaphysical principle and lived experience suddenly crystallizes, often producing an analogy as surprising as it is lovely."

Blanchfield's poems and essays have been published by The Nation, Harper's Magazine, BOMB, The Paris Review, Brick, Conjunctions, Guernica, and other publications.

== Professional activities ==
He has taught creative writing at the Pratt Institute, Otis College of Art and Design, the University of Montana, the University of Arizona, and the Iowa Writers' Workshop. He currently teaches as an associate professor at the University of Idaho.

In 2010 he became a poetry editor of Fence and in 2015–16 was guest editor of the PEN Poetry Series. He hosted and produced episodes 1-32 of Speedway and Swan, a poetry and music radio show on KXCI Community Radio in Tucson, Arizona.

== Bibliography ==
=== Poetry and essays books ===
- Not Even Then (University of California Press, 2004)
- A Several World (Nightboat Books, 2014)
- Proxies: Essays Near Knowing (Nightboat Books, 2016)

=== Shorter publications ===
- The History of Ideas, 1973-2012 (Spork Press, 2013)
- Correction. (Essay Press, 2016)

== Honors and awards ==
=== Honors ===
- George A. and Eliza Gardner Howard Foundation Fellowship (2015–2016)

=== Literary awards ===
- National Book Award Longlist, Poetry
- James Laughlin Award (2014)
- Whiting Award for Nonfiction (2016)
