= The Performance of Becoming Human =

2016 poetry collection by Daniel Borzutzky

The Performance of Becoming Human is the third collection of poetry written by Daniel Borzutzky. It explores the theme of violence committed by the state against its citizens, often combining mundane phraseology and jokes with grotesque imagery. The collection was given the National Book Award for poetry in 2016, and has been likened to Neruda's reaction to state-sanctioned violence in Chile. Borzutky's poems have been called un-poetic.

The question "Can a Poem Make the World a Better Place?" was posted by Borzutzky, who ponders if the expression of poetry can thwart the internal feelings of darkness and loneliness felt by those who emigrate.

== Early life ==
As a child of Chilean-Jewish immigrant parents, Borzutzky experienced emotional emptiness, which he calls "darkness," and used his poetry to find serenity in the world around him as a child.

Borzutzky is best known for his political works that reflect the common struggles of immigrants experiencing poverty and prejudice from those around him.

== Themes and style ==
In Daniel Borzutzky's The Performance of Becoming Human, the surreal and the absurd come together to show that we are living in the apocalyptic future we once feared. These poems ask how we (or maybe how dare we) experience the tragedies of oppression and cruelty as if they were as mundane as making the bed: "They chopped up two dozen bodies last night and today I have to pick up my dry cleaning." Through repetition and obsessive accumulation, every phrase leaps off the page, begging to be spoken aloud, or shouted. The work is as personally conflicted as Berryman's, as stealthy as Celan's, and as openly political as Ginsberg's.

— Judges citation, National Book Foundation

According to Borzutzky, The Performance of Becoming Human is the third installment in a series of books on "how humans survive amid the worst types of state and social violence". In an interview with the Chicago Tribune, he refers to Chilean poet Raul Zurita, whose work Borzutzky has translated, saying "[Zurita] told me in an interview that during the Pinochet dictatorship he wanted to create 'poetry as powerful as the pain being delivered by the state'. It's an impossible goal, but one I hope to emulate".

The collection is "formatted in paragraph-like prose chunks", which "break down into single sentences or fragments, often without punctuation", noted Healey in the Boston Review, but added that it wasn't exactly prose poetry. Healey remarked on the poetry's "prosaic tendencies", which he saw as connected to the "Latin American tradition—that impulse toward loud and rambling lines, surrealism and biting humor, empathy with common people against political oppression, as found in the work of César Vallejo, Nicanor Parra, and the more contemporary Chilean poet Raúl Zurita, whose work Borzutzky has translated into English". Borzutzky repeats phrases and images, blurring the lines between poems; repetitions include the standard joke opening, "Did you hear the one about", followed by some violent or grotesque image.

== Criticism ==
Following the National Book Award, Borzutzky was criticized for his language: "diction described as flat and repetitive; imagery deemed unrelentingly repellent; an authorial tone rejected as the un-poetic rantings of an ideologue". Carol Muske-Dukes noted that "the reader must confront the realpolitik that informs [Borzutzky's] style. Perhaps he is not a 'bad' writer (his intelligence and learning are formidable); rather, he appears to be writing as a 'bad' writer on purpose". To wit, his work "is an indictment of poetic simile. Think of Neruda, (with his other-worldly lyrical gifts) reacting to state-sanctioned violence in Chile: 'The blood of children ran in the streets like the blood of children'".

== Contents ==
- "Let Light Shine Out of Darkness"
- "The Performance of Becoming Human"
- "In the Blazing Cities of Your Rotten Carcass Mouth"
- "The Gross and Borderless Body"
- "Dream Song #17"
- "The Private World"
- "Dream Song #423"
- "Memories of my Overdevelopment"
- "Eat Nothing"
- "The Privatized Waters of Dawn"
- "Archive"
- "Obliged to Perform in Darkness"
- "The Broken Testimony"
- "The Devouring Economy of Nature"
- "Lake Michigan Emerges into the Bay of Valparaiso, Chile"
- "Lake Michigan, Scene #XIC290.341AB3DY"
- "The Mountain at the End of the Book"
