= Noah Eli Gordon =

American poet, editor, and publisher (1975–2022)

Noah Eli Gordon (1975 – July 10, 2022) was an American poet, editor, and publisher.

== Overview ==
Gordon was the co-publisher of Letter Machine Editions, an editor for The Volta, and an assistant professor in the MFA program in creative writing at the University of Colorado at Boulder, where he directed Subito Press. He ran Braincase Press, and was a founding editor of the little magazine Baffling Combustions.

His books included Is That the Sound of a Piano Coming from Several Houses Down? (Solid Objects, 2018),The Word Kingdom in the Word Kingdom (Brooklyn Arts Press, 2015),The Year of the Rooster (Ahsahta Press, 2013), The Source (Futurepoem Books, 2011), Novel Pictorial Noise (Harper Perennial, 2007), and Inbox (BlazeVOX Books, 2006). His essays, reviews, creative nonfiction, criticism, and poetry appear widely, including journals such as Bookforum, Seneca Review, Boston Review, Fence, Hambone, and in the anthologies Postmodern American Poetry (W. W. Norton & Company, 2013), A Broken Thing: Poets on the Line (University of Iowa Press, 2011), Against Expression: An Anthology of Conceptual Writing (Northwestern University Press, 2011), Poets on Teaching (University of Iowa Press, 2010), and Burning Interiors: David Shapiro’s Poetry and Poetics (Fairleigh Dickinson University Press, 2007). He was interviewed in the spring of 2007 by Rain Taxi, for whom he wrote a chapbook review column at the time.

Critic Michael Robbins, in his award-winning essay "Ripostes," published by Poetry Magazine, referred to Gordon's work as "simply dead — nonresponsive, flatlined, toe-tagged, rotting," while critic Stephanie Burt, writing for The Nation, noted how Gordon's poetry, which she called "delightful," is "reacting to big modern systems, above all to the system called capitalism, whose results and failures seem inescapable."

== Personal ==
Gordon was born in Cleveland, Ohio.

Gordon died in July 2022, aged 47. At the end of his life he lived in Denver.

== Awards ==
- San Francisco State Poetry Center 2007 Book Award for Novel Pictorial Noise, 2009
- National Poetry Series Open Competition winner (selection by John Ashbery) for Novel Pictorial Noise, 2006
- Green Rose Prize for A Fiddle Pulled from the Throat of a Sparrow, 2006
- Greg Gummer Poetry Award, selected by Robert Creeley, 2005
- Sawtooth Poetry Prize for The Area of Sound Called the Subtone, 2004
- Glosband Fellowship, selected by David Shapiro, 2004
- Jarrell Poetry Prize, selected by Carolyn Forché, 2000
