= Spork Press =

Publishing press in Tucson, Arizona

- Founded: 2001
- Headquarters: Tucson, Arizona
- Website: thisissporkpress.com/shop/

Spork Press is a small press in Tucson, Arizona edited and constructed by Richard Siken, Drew Burk, Andrew Shuta, Joel Smith, and Jake Levine. Beginning in 2001, it began publishing a quarterly literary magazine called Spork, which is often bound in hardback.

== History ==
At one time Spork Press was a publisher specializing in hand-made literary magazines with the occasional book release. It now produces a larger output of books and tapes while occasionally publishing the Spork literary magazine.

Spork Press also produces chapbooks and novels. The books published include Roderick Maclean's Tropic/of/Cubicle. Beth Toener's A La Recherche Du Petit Pseudo-Rockstars Perdu (Split E.P.) has been released in serial form.

In 2010 Siken and Burk decided to take a break from the regular publication of a literary magazine, choosing to instead publish issues of the journal only when they had an idea they were excited about. Issue 9.1 "The Middles Of Things", was the first along these new lines. Five authors were tasked with writing the middle of a novel, but were not allowed to write the beginning or the end; they were instructed to treat it as though they had walked into the middle of a movie, and to simply describe what they saw. Sharon McGill provided the illustrations for each piece, and Amelia Gray ordered the pieces, writing interstitial parts and creating a loose impression of a continuous narrative through the book. She chose to order the pieces from most conventional to the least. In the absence of the regular magazine, Spork has been publishing a chapbook series, though the term "chapbook" is applied loosely: "This here, this mixtape? It's a chapbook. This novel? It's a chapbook. Everything we do is a chapbook." Burk said, and that is how things are done by the publisher. Chapbooks have traditionally been throwaway items – Spork subverts this idea with letterpressed hardback hand-bound books, and an inattention to the rest of the things chapbooks usually are.

Most recently, Ariana Reines' THURSDAY (Spork Press, 2012), Joyelle McSweeney's the Necropastoral (Spork Press, 2011), Lara Glenum's All Hopped Up on Fleshy Dum Dums (Spork Press, 2014) and Zach Schomburg's, From the Fjords (Spork Press, 2011) have received attention for their quirky design and the texts themselves.

The Spork team consists of Drew Burk (Production/Editor), Andrew Shuta (Design/Production), Richard Siken (Editor), Joel Smith (Editor), Jake Levine (Editor), and others who help out.

== Writers ==
- Shanna Compton
- Stephen Elliott
- Matthea Harvey
- Tao Lin
- Ander Monson
- Stacey Richter
- Peter Rock
- Davy Rothbart
- Joshua Marie Wilkinson
- Amelia Gray

== Mixtapes and cassette releases ==
The Spork Mixtape series is, contrary to the current habit of referring to playlists and sometimes mixes on CD as 'mixtapes', a mix of music on a cassette. Highest-quality audio is sourced, sequenced and mixed, mastered at 32 bits and then recorded from the mastered source one at a time on a Sony dual-deck.

- February 2013, Mixtape 1
- February 2014, Mixtape 2
- "King Cobra" by Young Family. Spork's first official release toward transitioning from a book press to a press and music label.
- "NOTHING" by Isaiah Toothtaker. Spork's second official release, increasing the pace toward becoming both a press and a music label.

== Chapbook Authors ==
- Nat Baldwin
- Daniel Mahoney
- Sophia Le Fraga
- Isaiah Toothtaker
- Young Family
- Kazim Ali
- Lara Glenum
- Simon Jacobs
- Rauan Klassnik
- Brian Blanchfield
- Ben Fama
- Matthew Dickman
- Ariana Reines
- John Beer
- Joyelle McSweeney
- Zachary Schomburg
- Feng Sun Chen
- Colin Winnette
- Dan Beachy-Quick
- Gordan Massman
- Heather Palmer
- Drew Krewer
- Jake Levine
