= Tuff Sunshine =

American rock band

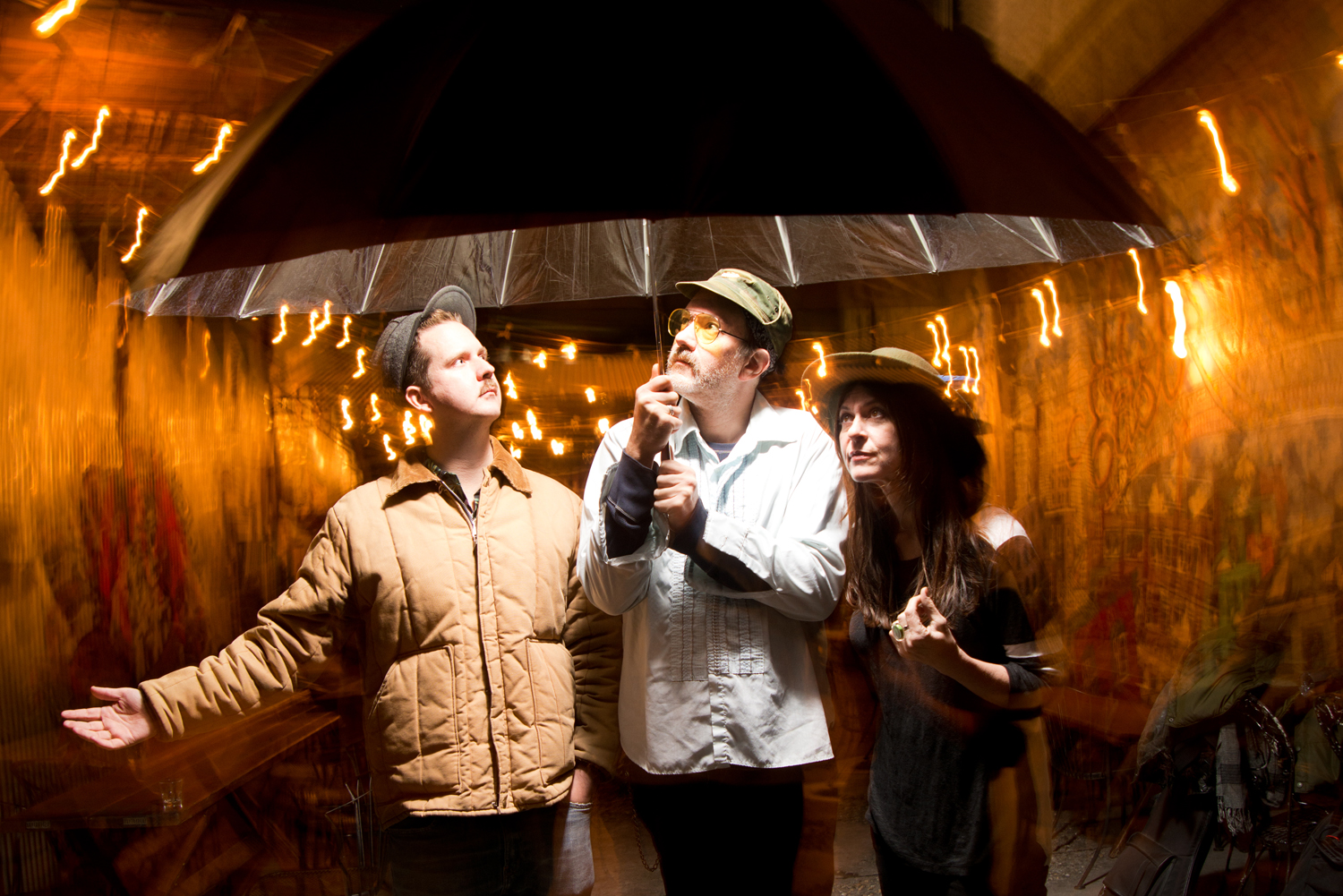
Tuff Sunshine in Williamsburg, Brooklyn, New York City, 2016

Tuff Sunshine is an American rock band based in the Bushwick neighborhood of Brooklyn, NY. The band is led by Johnny Leitera, who works with several backing musicians who join him onstage and on tour, as well as in the studio. They include notable artists such as Linda Pitmon (The Minus Five/The Baseball Project/Filthy Friends) bassist Turner Stough (Shilpa Ray/I Am The Polish Army) and founding member Ani Cordero (Os Mutantes/Rasputina), among others. Leitera and Tuff Sunshine have shared bills with such diverse artists as Tim Rogers/You Am I, John Doe, Jonathan Richman and The Dead Boys. Leitera also plays and tours as a solo musician and has played all over the United States, the UK and Australia.

In 2019 Sam Sifton of The New York Times premiered the video for "We Seal Every Deal With A Kiss" in his "What to Cook" column (Leitera is an avid home cook who posts about food and "mom and pop" restaurants using the hashtag #nochains).

Tuff Sunshine have self-released two EPs "Half-Mast/Steadfast" (2012) and "Kids Know" (2014) which was produced by Martin Bisi. The band also has released a limited-run full-length vinyl LP "Fire In The Hero Building" (2015) which has garnered praise from PopMatters, The Big Takeover and Magnet Magazine. Fire In The Hero Building received airplay on independent stations WFMU and WFUV in New York City, and the band performed live on WFMU's "Three Chord Monte" show on June 5, 2017.

In 2010 Leitera was American Songwriter Magazine's "Writer of the Week" while with his former band Low Water.

In 2012 DJ/presenter Nic Harcourt featured the song "Let 'Em In" on his syndicated radio show "Connections". The band were named "Artist of the Day" in the UK blog Louder Than War in 2013 and played the Team Clermont CMJ Showcase in 2015. They also recorded a Daytrotter session while on tour in the Mid-West in 2016.

Their debut full-length LP Fire In The Hero Building was released in 2017 via Brooklyn Arts Press.

The LPs "Yesterday Suit" (2021) and "Vanity Matrix" (2024) were recorded in Brooklyn, New York and South Paris, Maine with Leitera writing, arranging and playing all the instruments.

== Discography ==
- Half-Mast/Steadfast (EP, 2012)
- Kids Know (EP, 2014)
- Fire In The Hero Building (LP, 2015 (re-issued 2017 by Brooklyn Arts Press))
- Dig Deeper, Peanut (LP, 2019 (Declared Goods))
- Yesterday Suit (LP, 2021, (Declared Goods))
- Vanity Matrix (LP, 2024 (Declared Goods))
