= Low Water (band) =

- Low Water

Background information
- Origin: Brooklyn, New York, New York
- Genres: Rock, indie rock
- Years active: 2000–present
- Labels: Yinz Playin' Music?
- Members: Johnny Leitera D. Rubin Joe Burch Turner Stough
- Website: lowwatermusic.com

Low Water is a rock band based in Brooklyn, NY. Originally started in San Francisco, CA, the band relocated to the Williamsburg section of Brooklyn. The band's most recent cd is called, The Taste You Know and Enjoy. The songs "Voodoo Taxi", "She Shined Down" and "House In The City", appear in several episodes of PBS's documentary show Roadtrip Nation. The band consists of Johnny Leitera (Guitar/Vocals) D. Rubin (Guitar/Vocals) Turner Stough (Bass) and Joe Burch (drums). Johnny Leitera also plays with the Brooklyn band Tuff Sunshine.

The band created a mobile photobooth in order to produce a video for the song "Sister, Leave Me" from their second CD entitled "Who Said That Life Is Over?". The band's fourth CD, "The Taste You Know and Enjoy" was released on January 15, 2011, and has a seven-syllable title like the previous three CDs. The third track on the CD, "I Amplify", contains a Shepard tone at 1:00, and again at 2:07. The band discuses it in an interview with American Songwriter. The eighth track, "Centralia" is named after a ghost town in Pennsylvania which is the site of an underground mine fire. The song is a musical palindrome.

Former TechTV personalities Morgan Webb, Catherine Schwartz, Sarah Lane, Laura Swisher, Chi-Lan Lieu, and Sumi Das appeared in the band's music video Strange New Element. In addition to appearing in the video, Morgan, Chi-Lan and Laura are featured in the artwork of the band's first album, Hard Words In A Speakeasy.

In 2010 Leitera was American Songwriter Magazine's "Writer of the Week" while with Low Water.

== Discography ==
=== Albums ===
- Hard Words In A Speakeasy (Yinz Playin' Music?, 2004)
- Who Said The Life Is Over? (Yinz Playin' Music?, 2006)
- Twisting The Neck Of The Swan (Yinz Playin' Music?, 2009)
- The Taste You Know and Enjoy (Yinz Playin' Music?, 2011)
