= Daniel Borzutzky =

American poet (born 1974)

- Born: 1974 (age 51–52); Pittsburgh, Pennsylvania, U.S.
- Education: University of Pittsburgh (B.A.); School of the Art Institute of Chicago (M.F.A.)
- Children: Lorenzo Borzutzky, Felix Borzutzky
- Writing career
- Genre: Poetry
- Notable work: The Performance of Becoming Human
- Notable awards: National Book Award

Daniel Borzutzky (born 1974) is a Chicago-based poet and translator. His collection The Performance of Becoming Human won the 2016 National Book Award.

== Biography ==
Born in 1974 in Pittsburgh, Pennsylvania, the son of Chilean immigrants to the United States, Borzutzky in his work often addresses immigration, worker exploitation, political corruption, and economic disparity.

He received a BA degree from the University of Pittsburgh in 1997 and an MFA from the School of the Art Institute of Chicago in 2000.

Borzutzky has received fellowships from the Illinois Arts Council and the National Endowment for the Arts. He is an Associate Professor of English and Latino Studies at the University of Illinois at Chicago.

His 2018 collection Lake Michigan was a finalist for the Griffin International Poetry Prize. In 2021, he published Written After a Massacre in the Year 2018, which was reviewed in The New Yorker and was a finalist for the Chicago Review of Books Poetry Award. His other books include In the Murmurs of the Rotten Carcass Economy; Memories of my Overdevelopment; and The Book of Interfering Bodies.

Alongside his writing, Borzutzky is also known for his work as a translator. He received the 2017 American Literary Translators Association National Translation Award for his translation of Galo Ghigliotto's Valdivia (Co-im-press, 2016) and a PEN/Heim Translation Fund Grant for his translation of The Country of Planks (Action Books, 2015) by the Chilean poet Raúl Zurita.

== Works ==
=== Poetry ===
Full-length collections

- The Murmuring Grief of the Americas. Minneapolis, MN: Coffee House Press. 2024.
- Written After a Massacre in the Year 2018. Minneapolis, MN: Coffee House Press. 2021. ISBN 9781566896054.
- Lake Michigan, University of Pittsburgh Press. 2018. ISBN 9780822965220, OCLC 1007923836
- The Performance of Becoming Human Brooklyn, N.Y.: Brooklyn Arts Press. 2016. ISBN 9781936767465, OCLC 994060924
- In the Murmurs of the Rotten Carcass Economy Brooklyn, N.Y.: Nightboat Books. 2015. ISBN 9781937658335, OCLC 894937620
- The Book of Interfering Bodies Brooklyn, N.Y.: Nightboat Books. 2011. ISBN 9780984459827, OCLC 838471857
- The Ecstasy of Capitulation Buffalo, N.Y.: Blaze Vox Books. 2007. ISBN 9781934289242, OCLC 105635040

Chapbooks

- Bedtime Stories for the End of the World Bloof Books, 2014. OCLC 906944426
- Data Bodies (Holon, 2013)
- Failure in the imagination, Milwaukee, WI: Bronze Skull Press, 2007. OCLC 181911375

Poetry/essay

- Memories of my Overdevelopment, Chicago: Kenning Editions, 2015. OCLC 944444558
- Arbitrary tales, Triple Press: 2005. ISBN 9780976659310, OCLC 166144754

=== Translations ===
- Galo Ghigliotto, Valdivia (co•im•press, 2016)
- Raúl Zurita, The Country of Planks (Action Books, 2015)
- Raúl Zurita, Song for his Disappeared Love (Action Books, 2010)
- Jaime Luis Huenún, Port Trakl (Action Books, 2008)

== Honors ==
- 2013: National Endowment for the Arts Grant (2013)
- 2013: PEN/Heim Translation Fund Grant, Raúl Zurita's El País de Tablas (The Country of Planks) (2013)
- 2016: National Book Award, The Performance of Becoming Human (2016)
- 2017: American Literary Translators Association National Translation Award for Poetry (2017)
- 2019: Griffin Poetry Prize shortlist, Lake Michigan (2019)
- 2023: PEN Award for Poetry in Translation, The Loose Pearl by Paula Ilabaca Nuñez (co-im-press)
