= Heungbu and Nolbu =

Classic Korean novel

Heungbu and Nolbu (Korean: 흥부와 놀부; RR: Heungbuwa Nolbu) or Heungbujeon (Korean: 흥부전; Hanja: 興甫傳; lit. '‘Tale of Heungbu’') is a Korean story written in the late Joseon Dynasty (1392–1897). The identity of its writer is unknown. The story of "Heungbu and Nolbu" reportedly took place about 200 years ago, and was passed down through generations. It is now told as a popular bedtime story for Korean children.

== Story ==
Heungbu and Nolbu were brothers who were the sons of a very rich man. Nolbu, the older brother, was very greedy and coldhearted, but his younger brother, Heungbu, was kind and empathetic. The day that their father died of old age, they learned that he had ordered to split his fortune in half for each of them. However, Nolbu tricked Heungbu and his family and threw them out in order to keep the entire fortune to himself. Heungbu did not complain and accepted his fate of poverty. One autumn, the harvest was bad and Heungbu's family had nothing to eat, so he went to his brother's house to beg for some food for his children. Nolbu's wife, who was just as cruel as her husband, was cooking in the kitchen.

When she saw Heungbu, she refused to give him anything and struck him on the face with her rice ladle, but Heungbu did not complain. Carefully, he scraped the sticky rice from his cheek and asked her to strike him again. Thinking him stupid, she did as he asked. Heungbu gathered the rice from the other cheek and took it home to feed his children.

On the way back, Heungbu saw a snake inching closer to a baby swallow. Heungbu chased the snake away and treated the swallow's broken leg, which had gone unnoticed initially. The children were happy to take care of the bird until it was fully healed. They treated the bird with care and fed it insects. By the time the swallow's leg was healed, it had learned to fly, so it flew away with what appeared to be the rest of its family. After three days the swallow came back with a pumpkin seed and dropped it in Heungbu's hand. He planted the seed in his backyard and waited for the plant to mature. The plant yielded three large pumpkins. When it was time to harvest, Heungbu was overjoyed to find the pumpkins filled with treasure, fine fabric, and servants.

The rumour that Heungbu was wealthy spread throughout the entire town and reached Nolbu. Without hesitation, Nolbu met Heungbu and asked him how he became so rich so quickly. Nolbu replicated his brother's actions, except he broke a swallow's leg himself. The swallow brought Nolbu a gourd seed the following spring, and Nolbu planted it. When he split his gourds open, various elements of destruction came out of each gourd; the first contained dokkaebi which beat and chided him for his greed. The second caused debt collectors to appear and demand payment. The third unleashed a deluge of muddy water that flooded his house. Nolbu and his wife lost all of their wealth. They finally realized their mistake and asked Heungbu to forgive them and lived together happily ever after.

Names like "Heungbu" and "Nolbu" might be unfamiliar to people in other countries, but the moral that good deeds bring you wealth and luck is similar to many other folk tales from cultures around the world. This story also has great cultural significance in Korea because it challenges the common Korean value that the eldest son is the most important child of the family. Recently, "Heungbu and Nolbu" was published in an American textbook named "Literary Place 2, 3".

== Other versions ==
=== Older version ===
The older version of the tale exists, which is longer and contains extra details.

This tale centers around a man called Nolbu. An organ filled with vice (simsulbo) protruded from under his left rib cage. He is much more greedy, wicked, and heartless character in Korean literature.

=== Pansori-based fiction ===
Heungbu-jeon is considered a pansori-based fiction, which refers to novels that have been influenced by the narratives of pansori (a genre of musical storytelling). Heungbu-jeon is one of the five pansori that are still performed today, and Shin Jae-hyo's Bak-taryeong (박타령; ‘Song of Gourd’) is one of the major editions of Heungbu-jeon along with Heungbu-jeon that was printed in Seoul. The five pansori whose songs have been passed down and are still performed today include Chunhyang-ga (春香歌;‘Song of Chunhyang’), Sim Cheong-ga (沈淸歌 ‘Song of Sim Cheong’), Heungbu-ga (or Bak-taryeong), Sugung-ga (水宮歌; ‘Song of the Underwater Palace’, also known as Tobyeol-ga (토별가; ‘Song of Hare and Tortoise’), and Jeokbyeok-ga (赤壁歌; ‘Song of Red Cliffs’, also known as Hwayongdo-taryeong (華容道打令; ‘Song of Hwayongdo’).

=== Original folk narratives ===
Heungbu-jeon is a typical mobangdam, or a story in which one person becomes successful for taking one action and another person who follows suit fails. It consists of a didactic plot in which good deeds are rewarded while evil deeds are punished and also features an animal that repays kindness with kindness and harm with harm. The two old folk narratives have similar narratives to Heungbu-jeon, which are Bangi seolhwa (방이 설화; ‘Story of Bangi’) from the ancient Korean kingdom of Silla and Baktaneun cheonyeo (박타는 처녀; 'A Maiden Who Sawed a Gourd') from the region of Mongolia. For Baktaneun cheonyeo, some view it as the Mongolian adaptation of Heungbu-jeon after the story was introduced from Korea, but others see it as the Mongolian tale that was later adopted by Korea.

The plot of the Story of Bangi is as follows:

Bangi was kicked out of his house by his evil younger brother. He wandered through towns, begging for food. Then one day, he was able to borrow land from a stranger. In order to farm the land, Bangi went to his younger brother and asked for some crop seeds and silkworms. The evil younger brother gave Bangi steamed crop seeds and silkworm eggs. But Bangi looked after the seeds and silkworms as best as he could, and one of the silkworms came alive and grew to the size of an ox in about 10 days. When the younger brother got jealous and killed the silkworm, all the silkworms within 100 li (about 39.3 kilometers) flocked to Bangi's house. Thanks to all the silkworms, Bangi became rich, and all his younger brother's silkworms became his. In addition, one of the crop seeds that Bangi planted grew and ripened. Then one day, a bird took the ripened grains and flew into the mountains. Bangi followed the bird and encountered the children in red clothes. He found a magic stick that created anything he wished for and became even richer. When Bangi's younger brother heard about Bangi's good fortune, he also went into the mountains but only ended up getting his nose plucked out by the children in red clothes.

The story of A Maiden Who Sawed a Gourd is as follows:

Once upon a time, a maiden was doing needlework at home when she saw a swallow with a broken leg on the ground. She took the swallow and bound its broken leg with a thread. The next year, the same swallow returned to the virgin's house with a gourd seed. When she planted the seed, a gourd plant grew and yielded gourds full of treasures. In the neighboring house lived an evil maiden. Upon learning about her neighbor's good fortune, she caught a swallow, broke its leg, and treated it. The swallow brought back a gourd seed the next year. When the evil maiden planted the seed, a gourd plant grew and yielded gourds full of poisonous snakes that bit and killed the maiden.

== Themes ==
Originally Heungbu-jeon had a structure of a folktale (mindam), and other aspects were added to turn it into a pansori titled Heungbu-ga (興夫歌 Song of Heungbu). As a result, the pansori-based novel Heungbu-jeon has dualistic themes prominent in folktales and pansori. In the Korean academia, these dualistic themes are described as an “apparent theme” and an “ulterior theme.”

In the structure of a folktale, an apparent theme of Heungbu-jeon is that good deeds are rewarded while evil deeds are punished. However, the pansori narrative of the same story reveals an ulterior theme—the emergence of a rich low class and poor yangban is disrupting the existing social order and hierarchy. While both apparent and ulterior themes are important in understanding Heungbu-jeon, the ulterior theme is considered to be more important than the apparent theme.

== Texts ==
Among many editions of pansori-based novels, Heungbu-jeon is the earliest one. Major editions of Heungbu-jeon include the 25-sheet edition published in Seoul (hereafter, gyeongpan edition) and Bak-taryeong (hereafter, Shin Jae-hyo edition). The publication year of the gyeongpan edition is unknown. However, the fact that later gyeongpan editions have fewer sheets per volume suggests that the 25-sheet gyeongpan edition was published around 1880. It is also difficult to pinpoint the time in which the Shin Jae-hyo edition was written, but it is estimated to have been written between 1870 and 1873.

Heungbo-jyeon (hereafter, Yenching edition), housed at Harvard-Yenching Library, is a handwritten version created in 1897 by transcribing the text of Heungbu-jeon from 1853. Akimi Hashimoto (橋本彰美) who transcribed the Yenching edition was a Japanese national who aimed to learn the Korean language, and he generally transcribed the original as is.

Of the different editions of Heungbu-jeon, the earliest version is Heungbo manbo-rok (흥보만보록 ‘Record of Heungbo's Life’), which is presumed to have been transcribed in 1833. It is currently in possession of Professor Emeritus Song Jun-ho at Yonsei University, who is a descendant of Song Si-yeol (penname Uam). Heungbo manbo-rok differs from other editions of Heungbo-jeon in two major aspects:

First, the setting of Heungbo manbo-rok is Seochon, Pyongyang, which refers to present day Sunan-myeon, Pyeongwon-gun, in Pyeongan-do. All other editions of Heungbu-jeon that have been discovered so far have been set in a fictional town or the Samnam region (Chungcheong, Jeolla, and Gyeongsang regions). Heungbo manbo-rok is the only edition that states the setting as Seochon, Pyongyang.

Second, Heungbu's surname is written as Jang. His father's name is Jang Cheon, and this edition mentions that Heungbu passed the military service examination and became the progenitor of the Deoksu Jang clan (덕수 정씨, 德水張氏). Deoksu Jang clan is a clan based in Deoksu (present day Gaepung-gun), Hwanghae-do. All other versions of Heungbu-jeon discovered so far have either not provided the surnames of Heungbu and Nolbu, or listed their surnames as either Bak (homonym of the Korean word for gourd) or Yeon (homonym of the hanja character meaning swallow), which are relevant to the plot of the story. Heungbo manbo-rok is unique in that it mentions the name of Heungbu's father and also names him as the progenitor of the Deoksu Jang clan.

== Heungbu maeul (Heungbu Village) ==
Based on the geographical locations described in Heungbu-jeon, some scholars have theorized that Heungbu and Nolbu lived in Namwon, where Heungbu became rich while residing near Seong-ri, Ayeong-myeon of the town.

Although Heungbu-jeon has originated from a folktale and thus takes places in other settings as well beside Namwon depending on the version, the city of Namwon has branded Ayeong-myeon as Heungbu maeul, or Heungbu Village, and has been making the efforts to attract tourists to the town.

== Contemporary adaptations ==
Heungbu-jeon has been rewritten as a novel and poem, and adapted into a song, play, musical, madang nori (a genre of traditional Korean performance art), and film. The most recent adaptation of the story is a film titled Heung-boo: The Revolutionist, released in 2018.

== Editions and translations ==
The different editions of Heungbu-jeon include three editions published in Seoul, handwritten edition, old metal-type edition, and dozens of pansori editions. Among them, the gyeongpanbon (published in Seoul) Heungbu-jeon and Shin Jae-hyo edition Bak-taryeong are considered representative editions.

In the recent years, Heungbu-jeon has been translated into several languages. The English translations are as follows:

H. N. Allen, “Hyung Bo and Nahl Bo, or, the Swallow-king's Rewards”, Korean Tales, New York & London: The Nickerbocker Press, 1889.

J. S. Gale, “Heung-Poo Jun”, Gale, James Scarth Papers, unpublished, 1921.

Homer B. Hulbert, “The brothers and the birds”, Omjee the Wizard, Springfield, Mass.: Milton Bradley, 1925.

== See also ==
- Heung-boo: The Revolutionist, a 2018 film starring Jung Woo and Kim Joo-hyuk
- Diamonds and Toads, a French fairy tale with a similar plot and structure
