= Oh Jeong-suk =

South Korean musician (1935–2008)

Oh Jeong-suk (Korean: 오정숙; Hanja: 吳貞淑; 21 June 1935 – 7 July 2008) was an ingan-munhwage for pansori. She was designated as an ingan-munhwage 1 May 1991. She specialized in Chunhyangga, which is the 5th Important Intangible Cultural Property of Korea.

== Biography ==
Oh Jeong-suk was born in Wanju, Zenrahoku-dō, Korea, Empire of Japan. She learned the basic pansori from her neighbors when she was young. One of her ancestors was master of pansori Oh Sam-ryong. She was a member of Wori Gugak Group from the age of 14 to 18. She concentrated on mastering pansori and performing at the age of 21, and then she moved to Seoul when she was 23 to learn special parts from Chunhyangga from Kim So-hee. In 1962, she apprenticed under the pansori master Kim Yeon-soo and started to learn Chunhyangga, Heungbuga, Sugungga, Jeokbyeokga, Simcheongga, which are all kinds of pansori. She died at the age of 73.

== Career ==
- 1950–1963 Mastering the 5 songs of pansori from master Kim yeon-soo: Chunhyangga, Heungboga, Sugungga, Jeokbyeokga, Simchungga
- 1967 The 5th Important Intangible Cultural Heritage, Dongchoje Chunhyangga vocational scholarship
- 1972 Complete performance of Chunhyangga
- 1973 Complete performance of Heungboga
- 1974 Complete performance of Sugungga
- 1975 Complete performance of Simchungga
- 1976 Complete performance of Jeokbyeokga
- 1977 Joined the National Changguk Company of Korea
- 1980 Tour of North America
- 1981 Participation in Hong Kong Folk Festival
- 1984 Instructor of Gukak at Chung-Ang University College of Music
- 1985 Instructor of Gukak at Chu-gye Art University; participated in Festival of World Cultures Horizonte in Berlin; instructor of Gukak at Hanyang University College of Music
- 1986 Instructor of Gukak at Ihwa women's University College of Music; participated in the 4th International Peace Music Festival with Chunhyangjeon
- 1988 Instructor of Gukak at Seoul National University College of Music
- 1989 Joined the world tour at the European Folk Music Festival
- 1990 Attended concerts, Pan-national Reunification held in Pyongyang
- 1991 Designated ingan munhwajae
- 1999 Professor at Korea National University of Fine Arts
- 2002 Instructor of Ewha Womans University Graduate School

== Awards ==
- 1972 First prize in performing Important Intangible Cultural Heritage
- 1975 First prize Jeonju Daesaseup for Pansori
- 1983 President's prize in the 1st South Cultural Property for pansori
- 1984 KBS Gukak Award
- 2000 Presidential medal
