= Seopyeonje =

- Theatrical poster
- Hangul: 서편제
- Hanja: 西便制
- RR: Seopyeonje
- MR: Sŏp'yŏnje
- Directed by: Im Kwon-taek
- Written by: Kim Myung-gon
- Based on: Seopyeonje by Yi Chong-jun
- Produced by: Lee Tae-won
- Starring: Oh Jeong-hae; Kim Myung-gon; Kim Kyu-chul
- Cinematography: Jeong Il-seong
- Edited by: Park Soon-deok; Park Gok-ji
- Music by: Kim Soo-chul
- Distributed by: Taehung Pictures
- Release date: 10 April 1993 (South Korea)
- Running time: 112 minutes
- Country: South Korea
- Language: Korean

Seopyeonje (Korean: 서편제) is a 1993 South Korean musical drama film directed by Im Kwon-taek, based on the eponymous novel by Yi Chong-jun. It was the first South Korean film to draw over one million viewers and has had significant influence in reviving popular interest in traditional Korean culture and pansori.

== Plot ==
=== Present ===
In a Korean inn on a small pass called Soritjae of Boseong County, South Jeolla Province during the early 1960s, Dong-ho, a middle-aged businessman, asks a pansori singer at the inn if the road and inn's name, "Road of Music" and "Inn of Music", were named after her singing; she says that they were named after a man and that she learned singing from his daughter. Dong-ho requests a song and accompanies her with his drum, recalling his past.

=== Dong-ho's Flashback ===
As a child, Dong-ho's mother, a widow, and Yu-bong, a widower and poor pansori singer, were sexually involved and eloped with Dong-ho and Song-hwa, his adopted daughter, to avoid scandal. The woman becomes pregnant with Yu-bong's child but both die from birth complications.

=== Present ===
The singer confirms that the pansori singer was Yu-bong, who stayed in the house until his death, and that she learned to sing from Song-hwa, who left after mourning his death for three years. She surprises Dong-ho by telling him that she was blind when she left; while some say that Yu-bong had blinded her to make sure she would always stay by his side, others believe that he blinded her to inflict great sorrow in her heart so she could become the best possible singer, but reminds him that these are only theories.

=== Dong-ho's Flashback Resumed ===
The flashback resumes with Yu-bong teaching the young Dong-ho and Song-hwa the verses to Jindo Arirang. Dong-ho does not exhibit the same singing talent as Song-hwa, so Yu-bong begins to train him as a pansori gosu to accompany her. While traveling, they meet Yu-bong's friend Nak-san, a street artist calligrapher, who believes that Korean folk music is no longer a means to make a living as people turn to Western and Japanese songs instead and offers to take Song-hwa in. After watching a performance of Chunhyangga, Yu-bong and the male lead, formerly students under the same master, have a drink, but the situation turns sour when Yu-bong believes the lead is feigning sympathy for his situation and storms out.

During autumn many years later, Dong-ho and Song-hwa have both grown up to be young adults. At an event, Song-hwa impresses the male audience with her singing and is forced to pour drinks for them. After returning home, Yu-bong berates her for dishonoring the pansori profession. The three continue their journey and continue to lose jobs and money due to Yu-bong's anger issues and alcoholism.

Once, while singing Chunhyangga on the streets, a marching band passing by quickly draws the audience away from the trio and drown out their singing. Exasperated, Yu-bong visits a friend in order to teach Song-hwa new skills. When Dong-ho interjects that Song-hwa has no energy to sing because they have had to live off of porridge daily. Yu-bong furiously attacks him. Dong-ho retaliates and leaves despite Song-hwa's wishes that he stay.

=== Present ===
The flashback ends and in the present, Dong-ho travels to Osu, North Jeolla Province, where he finds out from a gisaeng that Song-hwa left their establishment three years ago but had been waiting for him. Coincidentally, he meets Nak-san, who recalls what happened after Dong-ho left.

=== Nak-san's Flashback ===
After Dong-ho left, Song-hwa became sickly and ceased to sing or eat, worrying Yu-bong greatly. He meets Nak-san and inquires if aconite overdose could blind someone. Yu-bong prepares Song-hwa's medicine for her and days later, she admits that she has turned blind.

They stop at a lodging near Baekyenosa Temple, where Song-hwa tells Yu-bong that she wants to learn to sing Simcheongga. Yu-bong begins to instruct Song-hwa but critiques her for not having enough despair and emotion in her voice. They travel and stay at an abandoned hut in the mountains, where Song-hwa practices daily. Yu-bong tells Song-hwa that sorrow is accumulated throughout one's lifetime and questions why the blind and orphaned Song-hwa still has no sorrow in her voice.

Time passes and the frail, sick Yu-bong admits to Song-hwa that he was responsible for blinding her and tells her that he can now hear sorrow in her voice, but that she must transcend it instead of being buried in it to achieve true greatness.

=== Present ===
Nak-san reveals that several years ago, he heard that Yu-bong and Song-hwa were living at the "Hill of Song" and traveled there, but was only met with a woman who told him that Yu-bong had died and Song-hwa had left two years ago. He did not hear from them since, until some years later.

=== Nak-san's Flashback Resumed ===
Years later, Nak-san, also impoverished as his works have fallen out of fashion, passes by an inn and recognizes Song-hwa's singing. She asks him to write her name for her, expressing that she can see it with her heart.

=== Present ===
Dong-ho arrives at the inn Song-hwa is staying at and the two sing Shimcheongga throughout the night. In the morning, Dong-ho leaves. The innkeeper asks Song-hwa if Dong-ho is the brother she has been waiting for; Song-hwa nods. She tells the innkeeper that she has stayed for too long and should leave. Reluctant, the innkeeper jokes that he is back to being a widower and asks Song-hwa to give him her address after she finds her next location.

Song-hwa begins her journey through the snow, led by a young girl holding a rope.

== Cast ==
- Oh Jung-hae as Song-hwa, a young pansori singer and Yu-bong's adoptive daughter. She dedicates her life to pansori and following Yu-bong's vision of pansori artistry.
- Kim Myung-gon as Yu-bong, a pansori singer who tries to pass on his technique and vision of pansori to his adoptive children.
- Kim Kyu-chul as Dong-ho, Yu-bong's adoptive son who learns to be a pansori gosu. He later runs away from Yu-bong's abuse and the impoverished situation of his adoptive family.

== Release ==
For many decades, the Korean film market remained dominated by Hollywood imports and domestically produced films were not as well received. When Seopyonje was released April 1993, the film was expected to draw limited interest as well and was released on only one screen in Seoul. However, it immediately received positive reviews domestically within South Korea and by October, at the height of its popularity, it was shown domestically on only three screens at once in the entire city of over 10 million. Nevertheless, it ended up breaking box-office records and became the first Korean film to draw over a million viewers in Seoul alone. Seopyonnje also found its way to screens at art theatres and college campuses in the United States, Europe, and Japan. When it was released, Seopyonje's success also increased interest in pansori among modern audiences. The film was acclaimed critically, both in South Korea and abroad, getting screened in Cannes Film Festival (1993), winning six Grand Bell Awards (2002), an honorary Golden Bear Award at Berlin Film Festival, and six Korean Film Critics' Awards.

Due to the success of Seopyonje, Director Im Kwon-taek also used pansori as a narrative tool in his later films Chunhyang (2000), based on the popular Korean story Chunhyangga, and Beyond the Years (2007), an informal sequel to Seopyeonje.

=== Critical responses ===
Seopyonje has received numerous attention by film critics and academics. Film critic Julian Stringer points out that the film's "use of structural ambiguities, or antinomies, [may] resonate differently for different audiences depending upon their cultural expectations and competencies". Common themes explored by film academics include concepts of national cinema, cultural nationalism, modernization, and gender. Kim Shin-Dong identified a set of binary oppositions between modern and traditional elements in the film such as cinema and pansori, technology and body, foreign and local, and artificial and natural, arguing that the film's simple narrative further emphasizes "the tension between the modern and the traditional (...) [with] the modern [as a] threat to the traditional art, culture, sprits, and values". Choi Chung-moo examined the film's politics of gender and body, reading Yu-bong's violence towards Song-hwa and Dong-ho as well as the alluded incest and rape of Yu-bong towards Song-hwa as response to the "deprivation of national identity and loss of masculinity by inflicting violence on colonized indigenous woman or onto the emasculated self".

=== Accolades ===
Year	Award	Category	Recipient(s)/Nominee(s)	Result
1993	Korean Film Critic's Awards	Best Film	Seopyonje	Won
1993	Korean Film Critic's Awards	Best Director	Im Kwon-taek	Won
1993	Korean Film Critic's Awards	Best Actor	Kim Myung-gon	Won
1993	Korean Film Critic's Awards	Best New Actress	Oh Jeong-hae	Won
1993	Korean Film Critic's Awards	Best Cinematography	Jung Il-sung	Won
1993	Korean Film Critic's Awards	Best Music	Kim Soo-chul	Won
1993	Grand Bell Awards	Best New Actor	Kim Kyu-chul	Won
1993	Grand Bell Awards	Best New Actress	Oh Jeong-hae	Won
1993	Grand Bell Awards	Best Film	Seopyonje	Won
1993	Grand Bell Awards	Best Director	Im Kwon-taek	Won
1993	Grand Bell Awards	Best Cinematography	Jung Il-sung	Won
1993	Grand Bell Awards	Best Sound Recording	Kim Beom-soo, Kang Dae-sung	Won
1993	Grand Bell Awards	Best Actor	Kim Myung-gon	Nominated
1993	Grand Bell Awards	Best Supporting Actor	An Byeong-gong	Nominated
1993	Grand Bell Awards	Best Art Direction	Kim Yu-joon	Nominated
1993	Grand Bell Awards	Best Music	Kim Soo-chul	Nominated
1993	Grand Bell Awards	Best Editing	Park Sun-deok	Nominated
1993	Grand Bell Awards	Best Lighting	Cha Jeong-nam	Nominated
1993	Grand Bell Awards	Best Planning	Lee Tae-won	Nominated
1993	Grand Bell Awards	Best Screenplay - Adapted	Kim Myung-gon	Nominated
2005	Berlin International Film Festival	Honorary Golden Bear Award	Im Kwon-taek	Won

== Bibliography ==
- Cho, Hae Joang (2002). "Sopyonje: Its Cultural and Historical Meaning". In James, David E. & Kim Kyung-hyun (ed.). Im Kwon-Taek: The Making of a Korean National Cinema. Detroit: Wayne State University Press. pp. 134–156. ISBN 0-8143-2869-5.
- Kim, Kyung-hyun (2004). "2. Nowhere to Run: Disenfranchised Men on the Road in The Man with Three Coffins, Sopyonje, and Out to the World". The Remasculinization of Korean Cinema. Durham and London: Duke University Press. pp. 60–66. ISBN 0-8223-3267-1.
- Stringer, Julian (2002). "Sopyonje and the Inner Domain of National Culture". In James, David E. & Kim Kyung-hyun (ed.). Im Kwon-Taek: The Making of a Korean National Cinema. Detroit: Wayne State University Press. pp. 157–181. ISBN 0-8143-2869-5.
- Adam Hartzell's review at koreanfilm.org
- "Im Kwon-taek's Retrospective". Koreafilmfest.com. 2007.

== Related Links ==
- Pansori
- Chunhyangga
- Simcheongga
- Korean Culture
- Arirang
- Korean Wave
- Chunhyang (2000 film)
