= Pansori-based fiction =

Genre of novels related to a Korean folk art

Pansori-based fiction is a genre of novels that are related to pansori (a genre of Korean musical storytelling) or fiction with strong characteristics of pansori.

== History ==
=== Relationship with pansori ===
Pansori became popular in late Joseon Dynasty and people began to enjoy many of its narratives in a book form. Pansori is an art of musical storytelling performed by a singer (changja) and a drummer (gosu). It consists of songs (chang), narration (aniri), and physical gestures (neoreumsae).

Pansori-based fiction refers to stories told through pansori that are written down in the book form. It is experienced differently than pansori—while pansori is heard and watched in a performance hall, pansori-based fiction is read at home.

The titles of pansori-based fiction ended with "ga (歌)", "taryeong (打令)" (both meaning "song") or "jeon (傳)" (meaning "story" or "tale"). As it was created in relation to pansori, pansori-based fiction has the features and aesthetics of pansori. The common view is that pansori-based fiction evolved from folk narratives (seolhwa) to pansori to novels. However, some believe that this may not be so for all pansori-based novels. In particular, there is an opinion that the pansori-based novel Hwayongdo (華容道) existed before the pansori Jeokbyeok-ga (赤壁歌Song of Red Cliffs) as Jeokbyeok-ga borrows from sections of the Chinese novel Samgukjiyeonui (三國志演義 Romance of the Three Kingdoms). However, it is difficult to say that Jeokbyeok-ga tells the same story as Samgukjiyeonui, and therefore it is impossible to confirm that the novel came before the pansori. Considering that pansori and pansori-based fiction coexisted in the same period, it may be more reasonable to say that they mutually influenced each other.

=== Scope ===
In his poem "Gwanuhui" (觀優戲 Viewing Folk Entertainers’ Performances), Song Man-jae (宋晩載, 1788-1851) wrote about 12 works of pansori. These include Chunhyang-ga (春香歌 Song of Chunhyang), Sim Cheong-ga (沈淸歌 Song of Sim Cheong), Sugung-ga (水宮歌 Song of the Underwater Palace), Heungbo-ga (興甫歌 Song of Heungbo), Jeokbyeok-ga (赤壁歌 Song of Red Cliffs), Byeongangsoe-taryeong (Song of Byeongangsoe), Ong Gojip-taryeong (壅固執打令 Song of Ong Gojip), Bae Bijang-taryeong (裵裨將打令 Song of Bijang Bae), Gangneung Maehwa-taryeong (江陵梅花打令 Song of Maehwa in Gangneung), Jangkki-taryeong (Song of a Cock Pheasant), Musugi-taryeong (Song of Musuk), and Gajja sinseon-taryeong (Song of a Fake Taoist Hermit).

Shin Jae-hyo (申在孝, 1812-1884) also left a record of pansori stories, which includes Chunhyang-ga, Sim Cheong-ga, Sugung-ga, Jeokbyeok-ga, and Byeongangsoe-ga. In his book Joseon changgeuksa (History of Changgeuk in Joseon Dynasty), Chong No-sik (鄭魯湜, 1891-1965) included Jangkki-taryeong, Byeongangsoe-taryeong, Musugi-taryeong, Bae Bijang-taryeong, Sim Cheong-jeon, Heungbo-jeon (Tale of Heungbo, or Bak-taryeong, Song of Gourd), Tobyeol-ga (兎鼈歌 Song of Hare and Tortoise), Chunhyang-jeon (Tale of Chunhyang), Jeokbyeok-ga (or Hwayongdo), Gangneung Maehwa-jeon (Tale of Maehwa in Gangneung), Ong Gojip, as well as Sugyeong nangja-jeon (淑英娘子傳 Story of Maiden Sugyeong). The stories of pansori listed in the abovementioned records that were written in the book form are now referred to as pansori-based fiction.

Among the 12 works of pansori, only five remain intact with songs—Sim Cheong-ga, Chunhyang-ga, Jeokbyeok-ga, Heungbo-ga, and Sugung-ga. These are called jeongseungoga (傳承五歌five passed down songs). For the other seven, only the narratives have been passed down to today and not the songs. These include Byeongangsoe-taryeong, Bae Bijang-jeon, Ong Gojip-jeon, Jangkki-jeon, Musugi-taryeong (or Geusa, 戒友詞 Avoid Foolish People), Gangneung Maehwa-taryeong (or Golsaengwon-jeon, 骨生員傳 Tale of Golsaengwon). These are known as "lost pansori" or pansori whose songs have been lost. However, pansori-based fiction includes novels based on pansori regardless of whether they are still performed as pansori or not. Additionally, some view Yi Chunpung-jeon (李春風傳Tale of Yi Chunpung) as a pansori-based fiction in a broad sense even though it is not based on a pansori due to the characteristics of pansori and similar plot as Bae Bijang-jeon.

It is estimated that the songs of the seven non-intact pansori were lost in the late 19th century. Although pansori began as a folk performance for the people, it gradually expanded its influence and was eventually embraced by the Korean elite as well. However, some were revised or changed to include aspects that went against general public sentiments, and the songs of the seven pansori seem to have been lost in this process.

=== Plots and themes ===
Just as pansori was created as a form of folk entertainment that reflects public sentiments, pansori-based fiction also tells stories with popular foundations and emotions. The general view is that pansori-based fiction reveals popular values through a realistic and secular plot. Some also argue that while the stories tout ethical norms of the time, people’s spirit of resistance and criticism of the reality are projected in them and therefore the stories should be analyzed differently depending on the themes that appear on the surface and within the stories.

Chunhyang-jeon is a love story between Chunhyang, a daughter of a gisaeng (female entertainer) and Master Yi, the son of a yangban. The two meet in Namwon and fall in love but are separated when Yi leaves for Seoul. Byeon Hakdo, who takes up a government post in Namwon, tries to force Chunhyang to serve him, but Chunhyang endures terrible torture and remains faithful to Yi. Eventually, Yi returns to Namwon as a secret emissary to the king to punish Byeon and reunite with Chunhyang. If we focus on Chunhyang’s loyalty to Yi, the theme of this story is a woman’s virtue. However, a focus on Chunhyang’s resistance against Byeon Hakdo’s unreasonable request would make a commoner’s resistance against government power the theme of this story. There is an opinion that Chunhyang’s resistance against Byeon Hakdo should be read as a story of human liberation. Also, other versions of Chunhyang-jeon that emphasizes Chunhyang’s virtue have been titled Yeolnyeo Chunhyang sujeol-ga (烈女春香守節歌 Song of Virtuous Woman Chunhyang’s Loyalty to Her Husband).

Sim Cheong-jeon is a story about a girl named Sim Cheong who throws herself into the sea of Indangsu as a sacrifice to make his blind father see again. She comes to life and her father regains his eyesight. Since Sim Cheong sacrifices her life for her father, this story emphasizes the ethical norm of "filial piety" on the surface, but some claim that it shows people’s awareness of realistic issues through the image of the patriarch Sim.

Ttokki-jeon is a story of a tortoise going ashore to get a hare’s liver in order to treat the Dragon King’s illness. It is sometimes referred to as Byeoljubu-jeon (鼈主簿傳 Tale of Tortoise). On the surface, this story seems to emphasize the tortoise’s loyalty to the Dragon King, but it visualizes the tyranny of the corrupt ruling class, symbolized by the Dragon King, trying to exploit the people, represented by the hare. Some also believe that the trickster image of the hare represents the vivacity and wit of the people.

Heungbu-jeon tells the story of conflict and reconciliation of two brothers Nolbu and Heungbu. On the outset, this story seems to be about the conflict and fraternity of the two brothers, but another interpretation of the story sees Nolbu and Heungbu as representations of the corrupt yangban and the emerging rich farmers, respectively, and considers the conflict between the two brothers as the conflict arising from the social differentiation of two classes in late Joseon Dynasty.

Hwayongdo borrows from "Jeokbyeokdaejeon" (赤壁大戰 Battle of Red Cliffs) in Samgukjiyeonui. It begins with Liu Bei, Guan Yu, and Zhang Fei making an oath in the Peach Garden and seeking out Zhuge Liang three times to have him as an advisor and ends with Zhuge Liang defeating Cao Cao’s army and Gwan Yu capturing and freeing Cao Cao. The novel is titled Hwayongdo because Cao Cao was said to have escaped on a road called Hwayongdo.

Byeongangsoe-ga paints the life of Byeongangsoe and Ongnyeo as wanderers. On the surface it is a tragedy as it ends with Byeongangsoe and Ongnyeo in despair, unable to settle down, but there are comical scenes and unconventional elements in this story. In particular, "Gimul-taryeong" (奇物打令 Song of Strange Objects), which describes male and female genitals has received spotlight for various metaphors and expressions.

Jangkki-jeon is about a conflict between jangkki (cock pheasant) and kkaturi (female pheasant). When jjangkki tries to eat a bean on the ground, kkaturi stops him, telling him about a dream she had the night before. But jangkki does not heed her advice and dies. In this story, jangkki symbolizes a stubborn, prejudiced, and violent patriarch.

Bae Bijang-jeon is a story about Bijang Bae who is wary of feminine wiles being fooled and shamed by gisaeng Aerang, who seduces him under the order of the governor of Jeju.

Golsaengwon-jeon (or Gangneung Maehwa-taryeong) tells the story of Golsaengwon who becomes infatuated with the beautiful gisaeng Maehwa and is humiliated.

Ong Gojip-jeon is about an ascetic who uses magic to create a fake Ong Gojip and teach the miserly and cold-hearted Ong Gojip a lesson by having the real Ong Gojip argue with his fake self about who the real Ong Gojip is.

Musugi-taryeong is a story about a playboy named Musuk who becomes a completely new person thanks to gisaeng Uiyang.

Gajja sinseon-taryeong is known as a story about a man who behaves crudely, believing that he has become a Taoist hermit, but is eventually humiliated. The songs and the narrative of this pansori have been lost, and it is difficult to know the exact plot of this story.

As described above, pansori-based fiction uses humor, satire, and jokes to express criticism of the reality with unique aesthetics.

== Features and Significance ==
Shin Jae-ho played an important role in relation to pansori-based fiction. When pansori became popular, he began to train and sponsor gwangdae (performers) and other talents. His most important achievement is that he organized and polished the narratives of pansori, including Chunhyang-ga, Sim Cheong-ga, Bak-taryeong, Tobyeol-ga (Song of Hare and Tortoise), Jeokbyeok-ga, and Byeongangsoe-ga, which are classified as "Shin Jae-ho editions." The Shin Jae-ho editions have contributed to the evolution of pansori into pansori-based novels to a certain extent.

Among pansori-based novels, Chunhyang-jeon, Sim Cheong-jeon, and Heungbu-jeon were rewritten as sinsoseol (new fiction) titled Okjunghwa (옥중화 Flower in Prison), Gangsangnyeon (강상련 Lotus in the River), and Yeonui gak (연의 각 Leg of a Swallow), respectively. Many of pansori-based novels are still recreated into modern poems and prose and adapted into TV shows, films, changgeuk, and musicals.

== Translations ==
Pansori-based fiction has been translated into various languages. English translations of pansori-based novels that have been published overseas are as follows:

=== Chunhyang-jeon ===
- H. N. Allen, "CHUN YANG, The Faithful Dancing-Girl Wife." Korean Tales, New York & London: The Knickerbocker Press, 1889.
- Edward J. Urquhart. The Fragrance of Spring, Seoul: 時兆社(Sijosa), 1929.
- Richard Rutt & Kim Chong-un, "The Song of a Faithful Wife, Ch'un-hyang", Virtuous Women: Three masterpieces of traditional Korean fiction, Seoul: KOREA NATIONAL COMMISSION FOR UNESCO, 1974.
- Peter H. Lee, "The Song of a Faithful Wife, Ch'un-hyang", Anthology of Korean Literature: From Early Times to the Nineteenth Century, Honolulu: University of Hawaii Press, 1981.

=== Sim Cheong-jeon ===
- H. N. Allen, "SIM CHUNG, The Dutiful Daughter", Korean Tales, New York & London: The Knickerbocker Press, 1889.
- Charles M. Taylor, Winning Buddha's Smile; A Korean Legend, Boston: Goham Press, 1919.
- W. E. Skillend, "The Story of Shim Chung", Korean Classical Literature: An Anthology, London: Kengan Paul International, 1989.
- Marshall R. Pihl, "The Song of Shim Ch' ng", The Korean Singer of Tales (The Harvard-Yenching Institute Monograph Series, 37), Harvard University Press, 1994.
- J. S. Gale, "The Story of Sim Chung", Gale, James Scarth Papers, unpublished.

=== Heungbo-jeon ===
- H. N. Allen, "Hyung Bo and Nahl Bo, or, the Swallow-king's Rewards", Korean Tales, New York & London: The Nickerbocker Press, 1889.
- J. S. Gale, "Heung-Poo Jun", Gale, James Scarth Papers, unpublished, 1921.
- Homer B. Hulbert, "The brothers and the birds", Omjee the Wizard, Springfield, Mass.: Milton Bradley, 1925.

=== Jangkki-jeon ===
- Peter H. Lee, "The Story of a Pheasant Cock", Anthology of Korean Literature: From Early Times to the Nineteenth Century, Honolulu: University of Hawaii Press, 1981.

English translations of pansori-based novels that were published in Korea are as follows:

- James S. Gale, "Chunhyang", Korea Magazine, 1917-1918.
- Chai Hong Sim, The Waiting Wife, The International Cultural Association of Korea, Seoul, Mar. 1950.
- Ha Tae-hung, Folk Tales of Old Korea, Seoul: Yonsei University Press,1958.

=== Translations into languages other than English ===
Pansori-based fiction have also been translated into French, Russian, German, and other European languages.

- J.-H. Rosny, Printemps parfumé, Dentu, 1892. (Chunhyang-ga in French)
- H.G. Arnous, "Chun Yang Ye - Die Treue Tänzerin Korea - Märchen und egenden nebst einer Einleitung über Land und Leute, Sitten und Gebräuche Koreas, Leipzig: Verlag von Wilhelm Friedrich, 1893 (estimated). (Chunhyang-ga translated into German)
- Sugungga, Le dit du palais sous les mers, Edition Imago, 2012 (Sugung-ga translated into French)
