= Chunhyang =

Chunhyang may refer to:

- Chunhyang, the main character of Chunhyangjeon
- Chunhyang (2000 film), a South Korean film by Im Kwon-taek
- Chunhyang (1968 film), a South Korean film starring Shin Seong-il

== See also ==
- Chunhyangga, one of the five surviving stories of the Korean pansori storytelling tradition
