= Ahn Sook-sun =

South Korean pansori singer (born 1949)

Ahn Sook Sun (Korean: 안숙선; Hanja: 安淑善; born September 5, 1949) is a South Korean pansori singer. She is considered a Living National Treasure in South Korea.

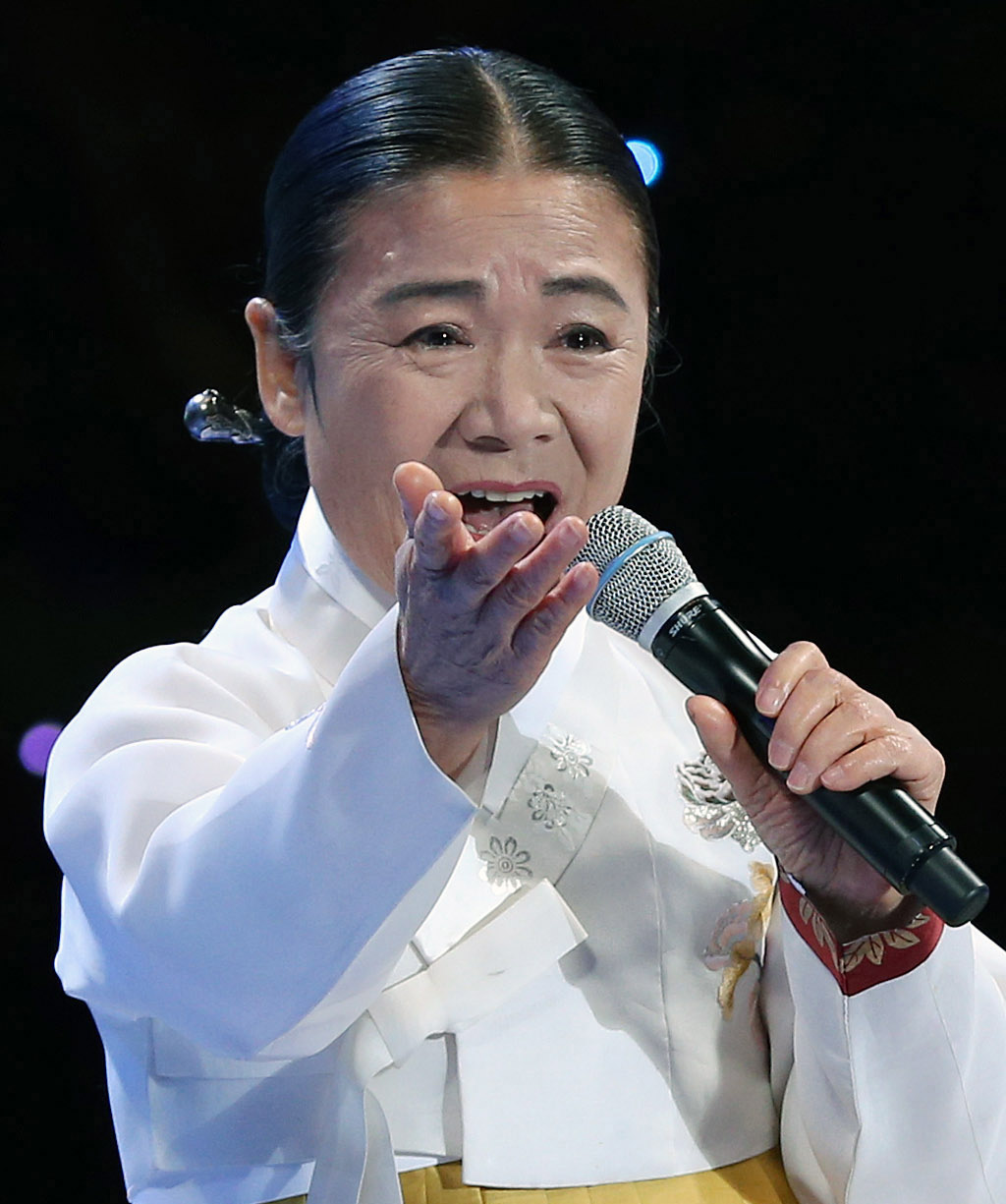
South Korean Pansori Singer, Ahn Sook Sun.

She is known as "Eternal Chunhyang (영원한 춘향)", "The Best Sounder of Our Times" and "Primadonna of the Gugak world".

She was invited to perform at the 2018 K-music Festival in London.

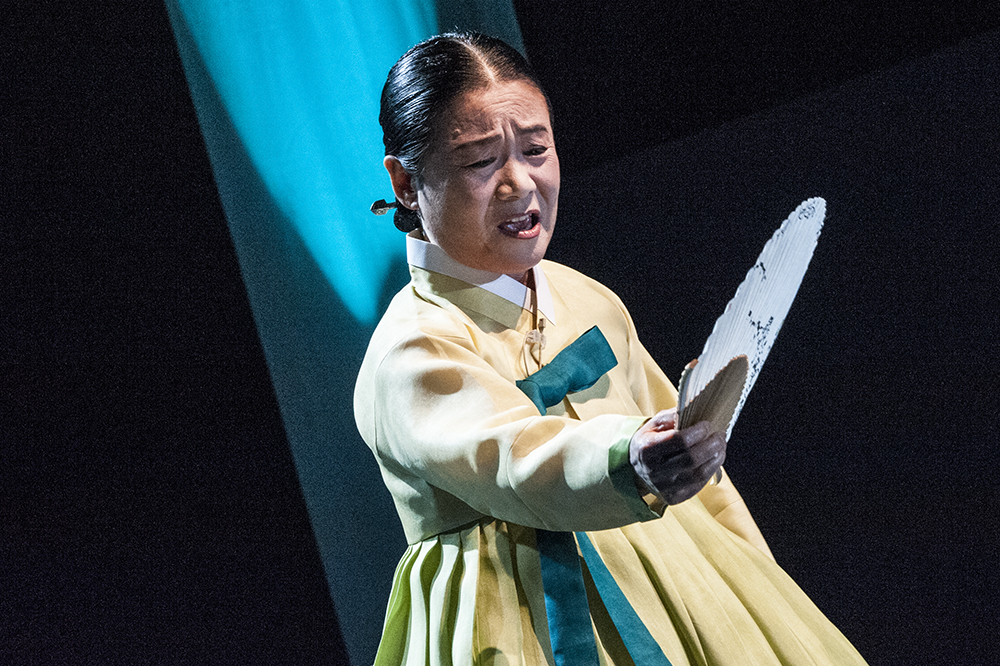
Korean singer Ahn Sook-sun performing in Warszawa, Poland in September 2012.

== Biography ==
Ahn was born in Namwon in 1949, which is the home of pansori Heungbuga, Chunhyangga and "Eastern style" of pansori (known as dongpyeonje). At nine, she was introduced to pansori by her aunt Kang Soon Young, who helped start learn pansori from Joo kwang-duk. During her teens, she learned the songs of the classic five madangs. After arriving in Seoul in her twenties, she learned more skills from Kim so hee and joined the national Changgeuk production team at age 31. She was awarded officier of the Ordre des Arts et des Lettres in 1998 with praise. She also performed at the Avignon Festival in 1998.
