= Chunhyang-jeon (opera) =

1950 opera by Hyun Jae-Myung

Chunhyang-jeon (Korean: 춘향전; Hanja: 春香傳; lit. The Story of Chunhyang) is a 1950 Korean-language opera by South Korean composer Hyun Jae-Myung. This is generally regarded as the first western-style Korean opera. During the Japanese colonial period, he, like most Koreans, was given a Japanese name based on his Korean one (玄山濟明 Kuroyama Sumiaki). The plot concerns a girl Sun Chunhyang, and is based on the original Chunhyangjeon, a 17th-century novel telling one of the best known traditional love stories of Korea, based on the pansori Chunhyangga.
