= Shin Jae-hyo =

Shin Jae-hyo (Korean: 신재효; Hanja: 申在孝; 1812–1884) was a theoretician and adapter of pansori in the late Joseon Dynasty. While not a famous singer of pansori, he contributed much to its development. He organized and recorded the six stories of pansori: Chunhyangga, Simcheongga, Jeokbyeokga, Heungbuga, Sugungga, and Byunggang Saega. Before this, they had only been transmitted orally. He also systematized a theory of pansori.

== Biography ==
He was born into the Pyeongsan Shin clan in 1812 in Gochang, Jeolla Province. Having studied Chinese classics, he had a good knowledge about its philosophical works (제자백가; 諸子百家), including the Seven Chinese Classics: the Four Books and the Three Classics (사서삼경,四書三經). He opened his home to relatives, gisaeng, singers, and other entertainers, with as many as 50 people living in his house at once.

He played the geomungo and gayageum in all styles of Korean music from classical music to popular music of the time. He valued diversity in pansori. He revised Chunhyangga for young pansori singers. He mentored female disciples such as Jin Chae-seon (the first female master singer of pansori), opening the way of pansori to women.

Shin died in 1884 due to disease while also grieving and longing for Jin, who had become a court singer for Heungseon Daewongun.

== Family ==
- Father - Shin Gwang-heub (신광흡; 申光洽)
- Mother - Lady Kim of the Gyeongju Kim clan
  - Grandfather - Kim Sang-ryeo (김상려)

== Popular culture ==
- Portrayed by Ryu Seung-ryong in the 2015 film The Sound of a Flower.
