= Jin Chae-seon =

Jin Chae-seon 진채선
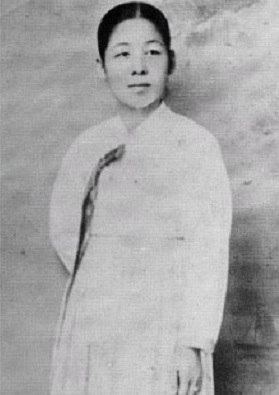

Background information
- Born: 1842 or 1847; Gochang County, Jeolla, Joseon
- Died: unknown
- Genres: pansori
- Occupation: singer

- Jin Chae-seon
- Hangul: 진채선
- Hanja: 陳彩仙
- RR: Jin Chaeseon
- MR: Chin Ch'aesŏn

Jin Chae-seon (born 1842 or 1847) was a Korean pansori singer, widely regarded as the first female master of a male dominated genre, although she was probably not the first woman to perform pansori, as gisaeng courtesans might have performed it before her. She was a master of performing Chunhyangga and Simcheongga.

== Life and career ==
Jin was born in Mujang-myeon, Gochang County in North Jeolla province, as the daughter of a female shaman. She had a talent for singing since her childhood, becoming good at Jeongak. She was discovered by pansori patron Shin Jae-hyo at the age of 17 and learnt pansori singing and performance at his school. He took her in as his student despite the social stigma that did not allow women to perform pansori at the time. At age 22, she was sent by Shin to perform at Nakseongyeon in Gyeonghoeru Pavilion, Gyeongbok Palace, where a celebratory dinner took place, disguised as a man. There she caught the attention of Heungseon Daewongun (the father of Gojong of Korea).

The Daewongun appreciated Jin's singing talent and kept her at the palace as a court singer. According to the Doosan Encyclopedia, Jin became the Daewongun's concubine, as well. She became best known for singing Chunhyangga and Shimcheongga.

Shin became devastated at the loss of his student, for whom he had romantic feelings. He dedicated a pansori to her, titled The song of the Peach Blossom (도리화가). When the Daewongun fell out of power, Jin returned to her already ill mentor and stayed by his side until his death. After Shin's passing in 1884, she disappeared without a trace. But it is also said that Empress Myeongseong might have killed her or that Jin might have fled to China and lived a quiet life then on. Neither the date nor the place of her death is known.

== In media ==
- Portrayed by Bae Suzy in the 2015 film The Sound of a Flower.
