= Kim So-hee (singer, born 1917) =

Kim Soo-hee
- Born: December 1, 1917; Gochang, Zenrahoku-dō, Korea, Empire of Japan
- Died: April 17, 1995 (aged 77); Seoul, South Korea

Korean name
- Hangul: 김순옥
- Hanja: 金順玉
- RR: Gim Sunok
- MR: Kim Sunok

Art name
- Hangul: 만정
- Hanja: 晩汀
- RR: Manjeong
- MR: Manjŏng

Stage name
- Hangul: 김소희
- Hanja: 金素姬
- RR: Gim Sohui
- MR: Kim Sohŭi

Kim So-hee (Korean: 김소희, sometimes given as Kim Sohŭi; December 1, 1917 – April 17, 1995) was an established South Korean traditional singer, designated officially as a human cultural asset in the heritage preservation programme for the folk opera genre pansori, which is fifth on the list of Important Intangible Cultural Properties of Korea. Her real name was Kim Sun-ok (김순옥). She specialized in Chunhyangga. She used Manjeong (Korean: 만정; Hanja: 晩汀) as a pseudonym, given by a physiognomist; it means to become a master of gugak.

== Biography ==
Kim Sun-ok was born in Gochang, in North Jeolla. She had two siblings, Kim Sang-ho and Kim Jung-suk and attended Heungduk Elementary School. She graduated at the age of 12 and went to Jeonnam Public School, while living at her sister's house in Gwangju. She started to practice pansori after listening to Simcheongga in second grade. Her sister's husband introduced her to Song Man-gab who was a master singer of pansori. Song's pupils typically paid five won, he charged Kim only one won. At the age of 14 she competed at Chunhyangje, a local festival in Namwon province, where she won first prize. After winning, pansori master Lee Hwajeongseon heard her and took her to Namwon to perform together. Kim then quit school and started to concentrate on pansori and Korean dance.

== Career ==
In 1964, she was designated as an Ingan-munhwage and established the Kim So-hee Gugak Institute to teach students.

She served as a Korean music instructor in Ewha Womans University, Hanyang University and Jungang University.

== Awards ==
She won a National Medal for spreading gugak and won the Korean culture and Art prize. She was awarded an Arts, Culture and Arts Promotion Target Achievement, Korea gukak target prize and 2nd Prize sponsored by the UNESCO Asia Music Festival.
