= The Sound of a Flower =

- Theatrical release poster
- Hangul: 도리화가
- Hanja: 桃李花歌
- Lit.: Song of the Peach and Plum Blossoms
- RR: Dorihwaga
- MR: Torihwaga
- Directed by: Lee Jong-pil
- Screenplay by: Lee Jong-pil; Kim Ah-young
- Produced by: Kim Dae-seung
- Starring: Ryu Seung-ryong; Bae Suzy; Song Sae-byeok
- Cinematography: Kim Hyun-seok
- Edited by: Kim Jae-bum; Kim Sang-bum
- Music by: Kim Tae-seong
- Production company: Cinema DahmDahm
- Distributed by: CJ Entertainment
- Release date: November 25, 2015
- Running time: 109 minutes
- Country: South Korea
- Language: Korean
- Box office: US$2 million

The Sound of a Flower (Korean: 도리화가) is 2015 South Korean period drama film based on the life of Jin Chae-seon, who became Joseon's first female pansori singer in 1867. Jin risks her life by cross-dressing as a man, at a time when women were forbidden to sing in public or perform on stage. The film focuses on the relationship between Jin and her pansori teacher, Shin Jae-hyo. The Korean title, Dorihwaga, is a song written by Shin about his protégée after she became a court singer.

The film was directed by Lee Jong-pil, who also co-wrote the screenplay with Kim Ah-young. Bae Suzy, who plays Jin Chae-seon, studied pansori for a year to prepare for the role. Ryu Seung-ryong plays her teacher, Shin Jae-hyo. Kim Nam-gil is the king's father and regent (the Heungseon Daewongun) and Song Sae-byeok is Kim Se-jong, a famous pansori singer. Lee Dong-hwi and Ahn Jae-hong play Shin's disciples.

== Plot ==
Jin Chae-seon is an orphan raised by a gisaeng during the Joseon era in 1867. She enjoys pansori performances and eavesdrops on lessons at the pansori school. She secretly practices singing when she is alone, and asks pansori teacher Shin Jae-hyo to teach her. She is immediately rejected because females are not allowed to learn pansori and perform in public. She then disguises herself by cross-dressing as a man, but got rejected again. When Shin hears the news that the king's father and ruler of Joseon, Heungseon Daewongun, is going to hold a national pansori contest, he changes his mind and decides to train Jin for the competition. However, no one must discover that Jin is a woman, or they both will face death.

After a period of training, Jin performs the Chunhyangga at the palace. Heungseon Daewongun is enchanted by her performance and decides to keep her at court. Shin Jae-hyo then realizes how much he loves her and composes "Dorihwaga" to express his longing for his pupil.

== Cast ==
- Ryu Seung-ryong as Shin Jae-hyo
- Bae Suzy as Jin Chae-seon
- Song Sae-byeok as Kim Se-jong
- Lee Dong-hwi as Chil-sung
- Ahn Jae-hong as Yong-bok
- Kim Tae-hoon as Low level official
- Shin Cheol-jin as Government Official
- Kim So-jin as Chae-seon's mother
- Ham Sung-min as Dongrijeong Temple disciple

=== Special appearance ===
- Kim Nam-gil as Heungseon Daewongun

== Release and reception ==
The film was released in South Korea on November 25, 2015. It was widely anticipated due to the high-profile cast, and had the most ticket reservations. However, it ranked a disappointing fourth place in the box office, drawing only 245,000 viewers during its opening weekend. Industry watchers attributed this to the film's "boring plotline" and Suzy's "unpolished" vocal performance. Lee Mi-ji of StarN News blamed the film's loss of focus and "stagnation" in its second half; it focused on the romance between Jin Chae-seon and Shin Jae-hyo, rather than Jin's life story. The film ranked thirteenth place in its second weekend, and had sold a total of 300,729 tickets at that time, earning ₩2.1 billion (US$1.8 million).

The film received mixed reviews from critics, who criticized the editing and screenplay, as well as Suzy's performance. Jin Eun-soo of Korea JoongAng Daily gave the film a mixed review. She praised Suzy's performance, but criticized some aspects of the screenplay, complaining that "somewhere along the way the film became an ode to Suzy, not Jin Chae-seon".

== Awards and nominations ==
Year	Award	Category	Recipient	Result
2016	52nd Paeksang Arts Awards	Most Popular Actress (Film)	Bae Suzy	Won
