= Kim Myung-gon =

South Korean filmmaker and musician (born 1952)

- Born: December 3, 1952 (age 73); Jeonju, South Korea
- Other name: Kim Myung-kon
- Education: Seoul National University – German Language Education (1976); Dongguk University Graduate School of Communication & Information – Master's degree (1985)
- Occupations: Actor; screenwriter; pansori performer; music director; theatre director; theatrical producer
- Years active: 1983–present

Korean name
- Hangul: 김명곤
- Hanja: 金明坤
- RR: Gim Myeonggon
- MR: Kim Myŏnggon
- Website: myunggon.com

Kim Myung-gon (Korean: 김명곤; born December 3, 1952) is a South Korean actor, screenwriter and music director. He is best known for starring in and writing the screenplay of Korean film classic Seopyeonje, for which he won Best Actor at the 1993 Blue Dragon Film Awards. Kim was also Korea's Minister of Culture and Tourism from March 2006 to May 2007.

Kim is a pansori performer. He was chairman of the organizing committee of the Jeonju International Sori Festival (Sound of Voice & Music) from 2009 to 2010.

He taught Theater and Film as an instructor at Woosuk University from 1997 to 1998, then taught Theater as a visiting professor at Korea National University of Arts in 1999.

Kim founded the Arirang Theatre Company in 1986, where he was active until 1999. He then became president of the National Theater of Korea from 2000 to 2005. He directed Korean stage play adaptations of Karl Wittlinger's Do You Know the Milky Way? in 2009, and Arthur Miller's Death of a Salesman (starring Lee Soon-jae and Jeon Moo-song) in 2013. Kim also produced Endless Voyage in 2012, a stage performance mixing ballet and traditional Korean dance.

In 2012, Kim published his autobiography Dreaming Clown, which elaborates on his various experiences with the arts and government.

== Filmography ==
=== As actor ===
- Steel Rain 2: Summit (2020)
- Idol (2019)
- Your Honor (TV, 2018)
- Along with the Gods: The Last 49 Days (2018)
- Misty (TV, 2018)
- Steel Rain (2017)
- Live Up to Your Name (TV, 2017)
- The Scholar Who Walks the Night (TV, 2015)
- The King's Face (TV, 2014)
- The Admiral: Roaring Currents (2014)
- Mango Tree (2013)
- Masquerade (2012)
- Bridal Mask (TV, 2012)
- The Great King, Sejong (TV, 2008)
- My Heart (2000)
- A+ Life (1998)
- The Bait (1998)
- Wind Echoing in My Being (1997)
- 48 + 1 (1995)
- Declaration of Genius (1995)
- The Taebaek Mountains (1994)
- In a Handful of Time (1993)
- A Casual Trip (1994)
- The Eternal Empire (1994)
- Seopyeonje (1993)
- Myong-Ja Akiko Sonia (1992)
- Fly High Run Far (1991)
- Ggok-Ji-Ddan (1990)
- Kot-ji (1990)
- The Man with Three Coffins (1988)
- Hello Im Kuk-jeong (1987)
- A Wanderer Never Stops on the Road (1987)
- Seoul Emperor (1986)
- Kod-ji (1986)
- Eoudong (1985)
- Declaration of Fools (1984)
- Widow Dance (1984)
- The Green Pine Tree (1983)

=== As screenwriter ===
- Chunhyang (2000) (script editor)
- A Casual Trip (1994)
- Seopyeonje (1993)

=== As music director ===
- Grown-ups Just Don't Understand (1988)
- Springtime of Mimi and Cheol-su (1987)
- When a Woman Applies Makeup Twice (1984)
- Jealousy (1983)

== Bibliography ==
- Dreaming Clown: Kim Myung-gon's Autobiography (2012)

== Awards ==
- 1993 14th Blue Dragon Film Awards: Best Actor (Seopyeonje)
