= Pak Tongjin (musician) =

Pak Tongjin (1916–2003) was a famous South Korean pansori musician.
