= Jeokbyeokga =

Korean pansori story

- Hangul: 적벽가
- Hanja: 赤壁歌
- RR: Jeokbyeokga
- MR: Chŏkpyŏkka

Jeokbyeokga is one of the five surviving stories of the Korean pansori storytelling tradition. The other stories are Simcheongga, Heungbuga, Chunhyangga and Sugungga. It is also known as Hwaryongdo. This story is a retelling of the Chinese historical legend of the Battle of Red Cliffs. Jeokbyeokga is a heroic story. Therefore, the expressions are grand, sublime, and strong. Accordingly, female singers rarely sing it. Jeokbyeokga has many scenes depicting conflict between the king, feudal lords and a commander, so the singer must have the capability of making grand vocalizations. A singer with an intense voice is aptly suited for Jeokbyeokga. Jeokbyeokga is considered to be the most difficult pansori, even though it is short.

== Plot ==
The basic plot of Jeokbyeokga is from the 14th century novel Romance of the Three Kingdoms by Luo Guanzhong. It starts when characters Liu Bei, Guan Yu, and Zhang Fei take an oath by blood to become brothers at Dowon. The last part is Liu Bei and Guan Yu's episode of Red Cliff. The highlights of Jeokbyeokga include 'the Sorrow of the Military,' 'Fire of Red Cliff,' 'Bird Song,' and 'Jangseung Song' which don't exist in the original version of Romance of the Three Kingdoms. Those come from deoneum which have been slowly made over a long period of time by the singers of pansori. In the Romance of the Three Kingdoms, the military is only used to redound the glory of the main admiral character and hero; however, in Jeokbyeokga, the military part stands out. Especially Sin Jae-hyo's Jeokbyeokga version made this part more prominent. Pansori is a performance in which a soloist leads a long story. In order to keep audience's interest, the singer should make proper humorous expressions. The humorous aspects of military are found in Jeokbyeokga, which are not shown in the Romance of the Three Kingdoms. The Jeokbyeokga altered the consistent grand and sublime atmosphere, adding the humorous expressions.

== See also ==
- Korean music
- Pansori
- Pansori gosu
- Culture of Korea
