= Heung-boo: The Revolutionist =

- Theatrical release poster
- Hangul: 흥부
- RR: Heungbu
- MR: Hŭngbu
- Directed by: Cho Geun-hyun
- Written by: Baek Mi-kyung
- Based on: Heungbu and Nolbu
- Produced by: Park Sun-jin; Choi Yeon-ju
- Starring: Jung Woo; Kim Joo-hyuk; Jung Jin-young; Jung Hae-in
- Cinematography: Park Jae-in
- Edited by: Kim Chang-ju
- Music by: Lee Byung-hoon
- Production companies: Gung Film Production; Valentine Film
- Distributed by: Lotte Entertainment
- Release date: February 14, 2018
- Running time: 105 minutes
- Country: South Korea
- Language: Korean
- Box office: US$3.1 million

Heung-boo: The Revolutionist is a 2018 South Korean historical drama film directed by Cho Geun-hyun and starring Jung Woo, Kim Joo-hyuk, Jung Jin-young and Jung Hae-in. It is based on the Korean folk tale Heungbu and Nolbu.

== Plot ==
Set during the Joseon period, the film follows an author who writes a novel to find his lost brother. On his travels he encounters a nobleman, who enlightens him.

== Cast ==
=== Main ===
- Jung Woo as Heung-boo
- Kim Joo-hyuk as Jo-hyuk
- Jung Jin-young as Jo Hang-ri
- Jung Hae-in as King Heonjong

=== Supporting ===
- Kim Won-hae as Kim Eung-jib
- Jung Sang-hoon as Kim Sat-gat
- Kwak Dong-yeon as Sheddong
- Kim Hyun-mok as Audience on street
- Song Wook-kyung as Jo Tak-soo
- Oh Tae-kyung as Kim Doo-nam
- Nam Il-woo as Prime minister
- Kim Hak-ryong as Jo Hak-ryong
- Kim Wan-sun as Queen Dowager
- Lee Hyun-woong as Kim Hyeon-ong
- Joo Young-ho as Jeong Yong-pil
- Gu Ja-geon as a citizen.

=== Special appearance ===
- Jin Goo as Nolbu
- Chun Woo-hee as Seon-chool
- Kang Ha-neul as Park Dol-po

== Production ==
Principal photography began on May 11, 2017, and ended on August 18, 2017.

== Release and reception ==
The VIP premiere for the film was held on February 12, 2018, with the participation of the main cast and invitees.

The film was released in South Korea on February 14, 2018.

In the first weekend of Korean Box Office, Heung-boo: The Revolutionist was ranked fourth and had sold 211,590 tickets. The film had earned US$2.51 million during the first five days since its release.

By the end of the February, the film was seen by 410,000 viewers.
