= Hyun Jae-myung =

South Korean composer (1902–1960)

Hyun Je-Myung (현제명, 玄濟明, 8 December 1902 - 16 October 1960) was a South Korean composer. Hyun composed and conducted the first Korean opera Chunhyang-jeon in 1950, and Prince Hodong in 1958. During the Japanese colonial period, he, like most Koreans, was given a Japanese name based on his Korean name (玄山濟明 Kuroyama Sumiaki).
