= Chuimsae =

Traditional exclamation in Korean music

Chuimsae (Korean: 추임새) is a form of exclamation during Korean traditional music. The gosu drummer and the audience make exclamations such as Eolsigu! or Jalhanda! (얼씨구, 잘한다), which mean Yippee! and Good! in Korean. The word chuimsae originates in the word dance (추다, 추어주다) in Korean. The chuimsae connects musician and audience and creates a cheerful atmosphere.

Chuimsae makes performance more enjoyable. With chuimsae, the music can be more active and vivid. In pansori, a good audience should make chuimsae. While in many styles of Western music the audience's sound is considered noise, the participation of audience is important in Korean music. The musician and audience can interact with chuimsae. The chuimsae is intuitive, and audience members express their feeling, impression, and agreement while listening to music. In addition, audiences make chuimsae when they feel completely enchanted by the music. In order to use chuimsae appropriately, people should have a knowledge of Pansori and ability in making impressions.
