= Deoneum =

Novel additions to pansori songs

Deoneum (Korean: 더늠) is a new, revised section of a pansori song, made by a master pansori singer.

Following years of training, master singers sometimes change or add new parts to a pansori song, inputting aspects of their own individuality. If this new version of the pansori becomes widespread in its own right, then it is called a deoneum.

The background of the appearance of Deoneum has several reasons. First, because Pansori was a popular art form among the public, in order to meet the expectations of various audiences or to cater to changing tastes depending on the times, there was a need to constantly pursue novelty in performances. Second, to stand out as a famous artist, a Pansori performer needed a long song that could compete with other performers. Deoneum emerged in this competitive environment. Third, there were Pansori performer selection or competition events such as Munhuiyeon (문희연; 聞喜宴). Through developing Deoneum, performers aimed to win in these competitions and raise their status as Pansori performers. Fourth, the unique characteristic of Pansori transmission called "Gujunsimsoo" (구전심수; 口傳心授) also contributed to the emergence of Deoneum. Pansori performers sometimes maintained the sounds they learned from their masters, but in certain parts, they could change the sound of their masters to reflect their own personality, or create a unique solo performance by combining sound, commentary, and gestures themselves.

The oldest one, called "Going Out to Let a Swallow Go," is found in the song "Heungbuga," and was sung by Gwon Sam-deuk in the Joseon Dynasty. It was the first known application in pansori of gwonmasung (a chant sung by palanquin bearers).

Other cases of deoneum are:

"Namwongol playboy" in "Chunhyangga" was sung by Dal Yeo-gye, incorporating the first application of gyeonggi minyo (a Korean traditional song originating in the Seoul and Gyeonggi area) in pansori.

"Song in Prison" in "Chunhyangga" sung by Song Heung-rok, which is the first time Jinyang rhythm (a slow rhythm used in pansori) was applied in pansori.
