= Chunhyang (film) =

- Film poster
- Directed by: Im Kwon-taek
- Written by: Kim Myung-gon
- Produced by: Lee Tae-won
- Starring: Lee Hyo-jeong; Cho Seung-woo
- Cinematography: Jung Il-sung
- Edited by: Park Soon-deok
- Music by: Kim Jung-gil
- Distributed by: CJ Entertainment
- Release date: January 29, 2000 (South Korea)
- Running time: 133 minutes
- Country: South Korea
- Language: Korean
- Budget: US$2.5 million
- Box office: US$798,977 (USA)

Chunhyang (Korean: 춘향뎐; RR: Chunhyangdyeon) is a 2000 South Korean period romantic drama film directed by Im Kwon-taek, with a screenplay by Kang Hye-yeon and Kim Myung-gon. Distributed by CJ Entertainment, the film was released on January 29, 2000 in South Korea. Lee Hyo-jeong plays Chunhyang and Cho Seung-woo plays Mongryong.

It is a film adaptation of the pansori Chunhyangga, one of the most notable works in the pansori tradition. To date, there have been more than sixteen works based on this narrative, including three North Korean films. Im Kwon-taek's Chunhyang presents a new interpretation of this oral tradition with a focus towards a more global audience. It is the first Chunhyang adaptation that uses lyrics of pansori as a major part of the screenplay. The film uses the framing device of a present-day pansori narrator who, accompanied by a drummer, sings the story of Chunhyang in front of a responsive audience. The film flashes back and forth between the singer's presentation and scenes of Mongryong.

It was entered into the 2000 Cannes Film Festival. The film is the first Korean film which was presented at the 2000 Telluride Film Festival. At the 2000 Asia Pacific Film Festival, it won a Special Jury Award. It also won an award for Best Narrative at the Hawaii International Film Festival in 2000.

== Plot ==
The film is told through pansori, a traditional Korean form of storytelling that narrates through song. It is based on Chunhyangga, a traditional Korean folktale, and is set in 18th century Korea.

Lee Mongryong, a governor's son living in Namwon falls in love and marries Chunhyang Sung, the daughter of a courtesan. Their marriage is kept a secret from his father who would disown Lee if he found out that he had married beneath him. The governor is posted to Seoul and so Mongryong has to leave his wife behind, promising to return for her when he passes the official exam.

After Mongryong and his father leaves, the new governor, Byun Hakdo, desires Chunhyang. When she refuses, stating that she is married and will remain faithful, the governor punishes her by flogging. Meanwhile, in Seoul, Lee passes the exam with the top score and becomes an officer. After three years, Mongryong returns to the town on a King's mission. There, he finds that his wife is to be beaten to death on the governor's birthday as a punishment for rejecting him. Mongryong arrests the governor for his corruption and avarice. The two lovers are finally united.

== Cast ==
- Lee Hyo-jeong - Chunhyang
- Cho Seung-woo - Mongryong
- Kim Sung-nyeo - Wolmae
- Lee Jung-hun - Governor Byun
- Kim Hak-yong - Bangja
- Choi Jin-young - Governor Lee
- Hong Kyung-yeun - kisaeng leader
- Cho Sang-hyun - pansori singer
- Kim Myung-hwan - pansori drummer
- Lee Hae-ryong - Lord of Soonchun
- Gok Jun-hwam - Lord of Okgwa
- Yoon Keun-mo - Lord of Goksung
- Lee Hye-eun - Hyangdan

== Production ==
The bed scene between Chunhyang and Mongryong took two days to film because Cho Seung-woo and Hyo-jeong Lee, who had no experience at all, were shy. The two of them didn't know there was a love scene until they started filming, and they were scared, and director Im Kwon-taek gave them homework to come after seeing Yellow Hair.

== Critical reception ==
According to Elvis Mitchell of The New York Times, "Instead the story is freshened through the use of a Korean singing storyteller, a pansori singer, to provide a narration, belting out the song from a stage in front of an audience. The pansori, or song, is performed under a proscenium arch to highlight the ritual elements of folk tales. Even though much of what the pansori tells us unfolds before the cameras at the same moment, the forcefulness of the performance lends another layer of feeling to the picture."

== Awards and nominations ==
Year	Award	Category	Recipients	Result	Ref.
2000	53rd Cannes Film Festival	Palme d'Or	Im Kwon-taek	Nominated	
2000	21st Blue Dragon Film Awards	Best Film	Chunhyang	Nominated	
2000	21st Blue Dragon Film Awards	Best Director	Im Kwon-taek	Nominated	
2000	21st Blue Dragon Film Awards	Best Supporting Actress	Kim Sung-nyeo	Nominated	
2000	21st Blue Dragon Film Awards	Best New Actor	Cho Seung-woo	Nominated	
2000	37th Grand Bell Awards	Best Film	Chunhyang	Nominated	
2000	37th Grand Bell Awards	Special Jury Award	Im Kwon-taek	Won	
2000	37th Grand Bell Awards	Best Director	Im Kwon-taek	Nominated	
2000	37th Grand Bell Awards	Best Supporting Actress	Kim Sung-nyeo	Nominated	
2000	37th Grand Bell Awards	Best New Actor	Cho Seung-woo	Nominated	
2000	37th Grand Bell Awards	Best New Actress	Lee Hyo-jeong	Nominated	
2000	37th Grand Bell Awards	Best Cinematography	Jung II-sung	Nominated	
2000	37th Grand Bell Awards	Best Art Direction	Min Eon-ok	Won	
2000	36th Baeksang Arts Awards	Grand Prize (Daesang)	Chunhyang	Won	
2000	36th Baeksang Arts Awards	Best Director	Im Kwon-taek	Won	
2000	8th Chunsa Film Art Awards	Best Supporting Actress	Kim Sung-nyeo	Won	
2000	8th Chunsa Film Art Awards	Best Cinematography	Jung II-sung	Won	
2000	8th Chunsa Film Art Awards	Best Lighting	Lee Min-bu	Won	
2000	8th Chunsa Film Art Awards	Best Planning/Producer	Lee Tae-won	Won	
2000	Telluride Film Festival	Film Presented	Chunhyang	Won	
2000	Asia Pacific Film Festival	Special Jury Award	Chunhyang	Won	
2000	Hawaii International Film Festival	Narrative Feature	Chunhyang	Won	
2000	5th Busan International Film Festival	Netpac Award	Im Kwon-taek	Won	
2000	13th Singapore International Film Festival	Best Director	Im Kwon-taek	Won	
2000	20th Korean Association of Film Critics Awards	Best Cinematography	Jung Il-sung	Won	
2001	Fribourg International Film Festival	Grand Prix	Im Kwon-taek	Nominated	
