= Secret royal inspector =

Government position in Joseon Korea

- Hangul: 암행어사
- Hanja: 暗行御史
- RR: amhaengeosa
- MR: amhaengŏsa

The secret royal inspector in Korea was a temporary position unique to the Joseon Dynasty, in which an undercover official directly appointed by the king was sent to local provinces to monitor government officials and look after the populace while traveling incognito. Unlike regular inspectors whose activities under Office of Inspector General were official and public, the appointment and activities of secret royal inspectors were kept strictly secret throughout the mission.

== Position description ==
Generally, young officials (usually in their thirties) of low or middle rank were appointed as secret royal inspectors because they had to travel long distances for an extended period of time. Young officials were also more likely to have a strong sense of justice and less likely to have personal connections with local officials. Even though the secret royal inspector was a temporary position (and young men of lower rank were appointed to it), its authority was equivalent to a governor (highest-ranking local official) and he had the power to dismiss local officials including governor in the name of the king.

For their secret mission, they received a letter of appointment (pongsŏ, 封書, 봉서), a description of their destination and mission (samok, 事目, 사목), and a "horse requisition tablet" called map'ae(馬牌, 마패), which they used to requisition horses and men from a local station run by the central government. To ensure the secrecy of the mission, a secret royal inspector could open the pongsŏ only after leaving the capital. When they arrived at the assigned district, they surveyed the area in disguise. After the secret surveillance was completed, they revealed themselves by presenting map'ae or pongsŏ and inspected the magistrate's office and records (Ch'uldu, 出頭, 출두). If they found cases that were unjustly judged, they presided over a retrial (Ŏsa-Chegim, 御史題音, 어사제김) to redress wrongs. In the event of a severe dereliction of administrative duty by a magistrate, a secret inspector was authorized to seal the public assets surrounding the administrative offices (Ponggo, 封庫, 봉고) and suspend the magistrate's administrative privileges. After the completion of their mission, inspectors returned to the capital and presented a report to the king – detailing wrongs committed by former and active local officials, reporting on the mood of the populace, and recommending hidden talents for appointment and virtuous villagers for award.

The title is mentioned for the first time in 1555 during Myeongjong's reign, but it already existed as early as 1509 during Jungjong's reign. The activities of secret royal inspectors became more frequent and prevalent during late Joseon period. The last secret royal inspector was Yi Myŏnsang, who served in Jeolla province in 1892.

The secret inspector system was very effective in reducing corruption in provinces, but it also had many problems. Many secret inspectors, such as Chŏng Yagyong, suffered political repercussions in the royal court from the magistrates they had prosecuted during their missions. In regional administrative offices, they sometimes faced threats from the corrupt local officials they had punished in the past. In addition, secret royal inspectors had to pay expenses for the mission out of their pocket. Therefore, a secret royal inspector sometimes had to pose as a beggar more out of necessity than for sake of secrecy. After Sukjong's time, secret royal inspector system was also abused as a weapon in factional fighting.

Since the Middle Joseon period, 613 secret royal inspectors went into action. Famous figures who served as secret royal inspectors include Cho Kwangjo, Yi Hwang, Chŏng Yagyong, and writer Kim Man-jung. Yi Sibal (during Seonjo's reign), Yi Kŏnch'ang (during Gojong's reign) and especially Park Mun-su (during Yeongjo's reign) are famous for their work as secret royal inspector. Secret royal inspectors were popular subject for fiction in both Joseon period and modern times. Many legends about Park Mun-su as the avenger for the people exploited by corrupt officials have passed down through folk tales; there are 300 such stories. The exploits of a secret royal inspector is featured in the popular Joseon-era novel Chunhyangjeon. In recent years, the 1981–1983 TV series Secret Royal Inspector, the 2002 TV series Inspector Park Mun-su, the 2009 TV series Tamra, Island and several film adaptations of Chunhyangjeon have secret royal inspectors as their main protagonist.

"Undercover royal inspector" is more literal and accurate translation of amhaengŏsa, but it is more frequently translated as secret royal inspector. "Amhaeng" can be literally translated into "dark maneuver" but is usually translated into "undercover", and "ŏsa" can be translated into "government officer".

== In popular culture ==
The position of secret royal inspector is prominent in the Korean folk tale of Chunhyangjeon, which is perhaps the most famous Korean folk tale. The role of the secret royal inspector has been depicted in historical South Korean dramas. In Royal Secret Agent, a 2020 historical comedy television series, Kim Myung-soo portrayed the character of a secret royal inspector. In 2021, Ok Taec-yeon portrayed the character of a secret royal inspector in the historical comedy television series Secret Royal Inspector & Joy.
