= Sugungga =

Pansori story (Korean musical tradition)

- Hangul: 수궁가
- Hanja: 水宮歌
- RR: Sugungga
- MR: Sugungga

Sugungga is one of the five surviving stories of the Korean pansori storytelling tradition. The other stories are Simcheongga, Heungbuga, Jeokbyeokga, and Chunhyangga.

Sugungga is considered to be more exciting and farcical than the other pansoris because of its personification of animals. The satire is more frank and humorous. It has serious parts as well in the characters of the king and loyal retainers. Therefore Sugungga is regarded as the "small Jeokbyeokga;" so Pansori singers sing those parts earnestly.

Sugungga is based on the story of the Dragon King of the Southern Sea, a softshell turtle, and a wily rabbit. This story is believed to have stemmed from a tale "Gutojiseol" (龜兎之說, also pronounced "Gwitojiseol") from the section on Kim Yu-sin from the Silla dynasty in Samguk sagi, and possibly from The Monkey and the Crocodile from the Jataka tales, an Indian literature, The theme of this story is the relationship of subject to king.

The play was popularized by the South Korean band Leenalchi who uploaded their live action performance of the story on YouTube. The video went viral in South Korea, amassing over 6 million views as of January 2021.

== Plot ==
The story begins in a fictional kingdom in the Southern Sea ruled by a Dragon King who suffers from an illness that can only be cured by consuming the liver of a rabbit. (Note: In "Gutojiseol" (龜兎之說), the daughter of the Dragon King from the Eastern Sea suffered from the illness.) In hopes of finding the liver to cure his disease, the dragon king commands his servants to go onto land, find a rabbit, and bring its liver back to the kingdom. Out of the servants, a softshell turtle volunteers to perform this act, showing his loyalty to the king.

The softshell turtle is met with several challenges on land from an encounter with a predatory tiger to not knowing what a rabbit looks like. At the end, however, the softshell turtle succeeds in finding a rabbit. In order to get the rabbit to follow it back to the underwater kingdom, the softshell turtle lures the rabbit by telling him that a wonderous and luxurious life awaits it there. The rabbit falls for it, follows the softshell turtle underwater, and soon finds itself captured in the dragon king's palace. The rabbit soon realizes that it had been tricked and will be soon slaughtered for its liver. Right before slaughtering, however, the rabbit tells the dragon king that its liver is so much in demand that someone may steal it away from the king as soon as he kills it and that because of this, it had to be slaughtered somewhere away from everyone. The dragon king listens to the rabbit and commands the softshell turtle to kill it away from the kingdom. Upon getting far enough from the kingdom, the rabbit ridicules the dragon king's naïveté and flees back onto land, essentially tricking both the softshell turtle and the dragon king.

The story ends with the rabbit ridiculing the king and the softshell turtle once again, but admiring the softshell turtle's loyalty to the king as well.

== Theme ==
The primary, over-arching theme of the story is the consequences of being naïve. In the story, the dragon King learns the hard way that being naive is a negative trait by missing an opportunity to live. It can be reasonably implied that the King loses its life after the story because of his naïveté.

== See also ==
- Changgeuk
- Korean music
- Pansori
- Pansori gosu
- Culture of Korea
- Tiger is Coming
