= Heungbuga =

Korean pansori story

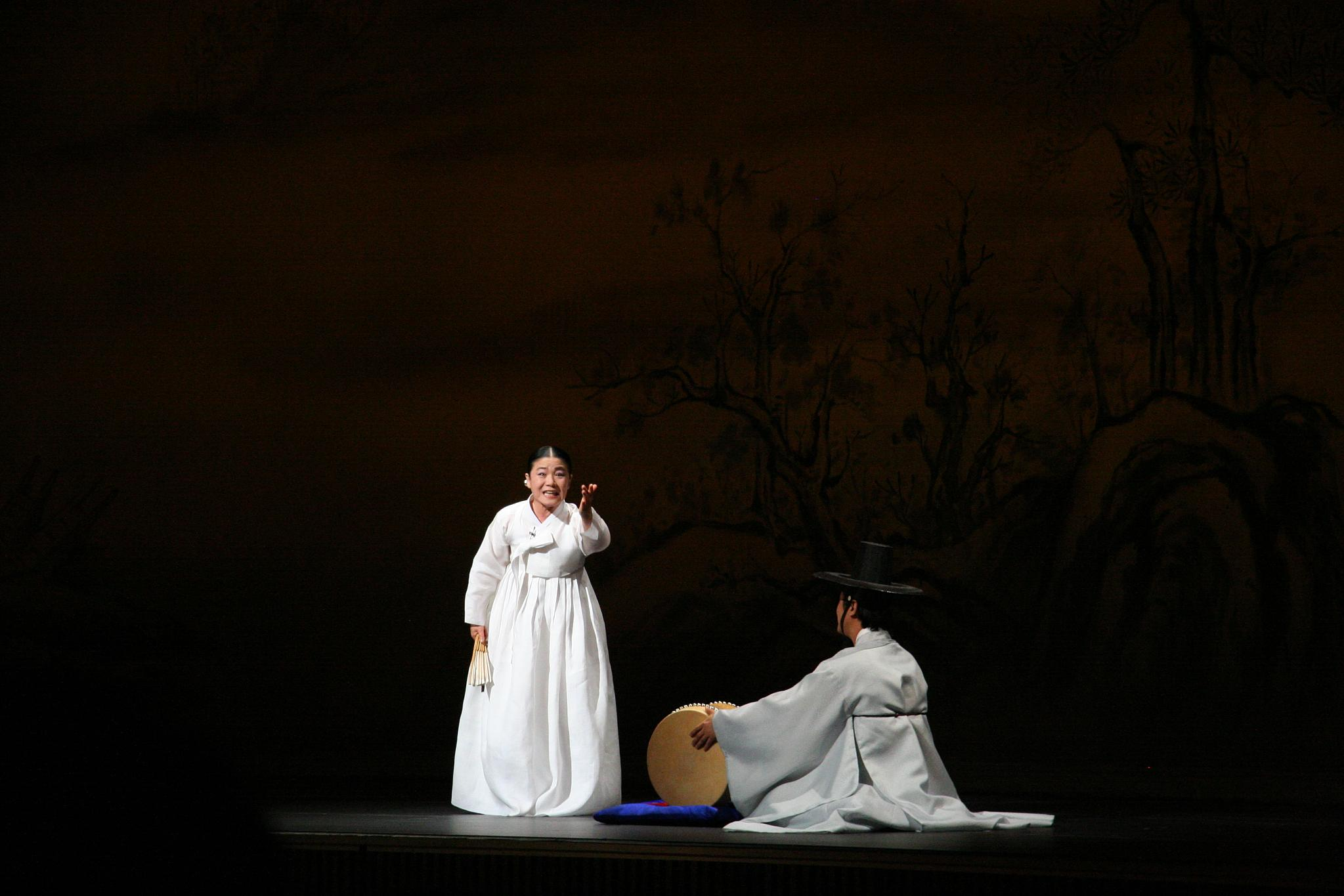
- Heungbuga performed by Ahn Suk-seon for the World Library and Information Congress at COEX, Seoul, South Korea, 2006.

Korean name
- Hangul: 흥부가
- Hanja: 興夫歌
- Revised Romanization: Heungbuga
- McCune–Reischauer: Hŭngbuga

Heungbuga (Korean: 흥부가) is one of the five surviving stories of the Korean pansori storytelling tradition. It is also called Baktaryeong (박타령) or Hungboga (흥보가). The other stories are Simcheongga, Chunhyangga, Jeokbyeokga and Sugungga. It is about the story of Heungbu, a poor but good man with many children. Heungbuga depicts common people's lives with a folksy atmosphere. Many listeners prefer Heungbuga because of its focus on humor. This humor in pansori is called jaedam sori, which means funny sound in Korean.

The most famous part of Heungbuga is "Cranky Nolbu," depicting the nasty Nolbu in a light-hearted fashion with a fast Jajinmori rhythm. It is widely considered that the latter part of Heungbuga is inferior to the beginning. One explanation for this is that the latter part was not sufficiently revised by its singers over the years. This could be used as evidence for the importance of deoneum in pansori.

== Plot ==
Heungbuga is also called Bak taryung (Gourd Song). Poor but good-hearted younger brother Heungbu cares for a swallow's broken leg, and the swallow repays Heungbu's kindness. The swallow brings a gourd seed to Heungbu, who plants the seed. The gourd yields fruit containing treasure. Upon hearing this, Heungbu's older brother, the nasty and greedy Nolbu, becomes jealous, and he breaks a swallow's leg intentionally. After that Nolbu, too, gets a gourd seed; however this time the fruit contains goblins.

== Theme ==
Heungbuga is a moral story emphasizing brotherly love, with themes and ideas of cause and effect and retribution. However, promoting Confucian ethics and morality is not the sole purpose of the story. Behind this fairy tale, there is a theme that reveals a new realistic worldview that the common people have acquired - "existing conventions are futile" - through subjects such as fallen aristocrats who still try to maintain their status in the midst of rapidly changing social phenomena at the time.

== See also ==
- Korean music
- Pansori
- Pansori gosu
- Culture of Korea
