= Chunhyangjeon =

Korean folk tale

- Hangul: 춘향전
- Hanja: 春香傳
- Revised Romanization: Chunhyangjeon
- McCune–Reischauer: Ch'unhyangjŏn

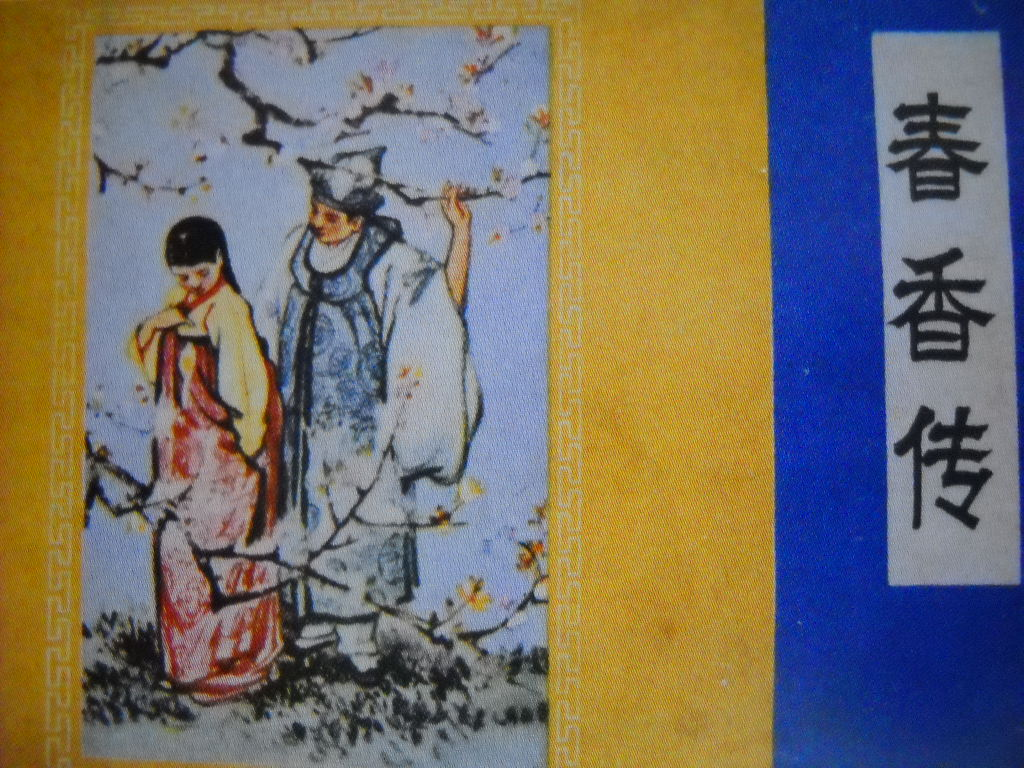
Cover

Chunhyangjeon (Korean: 춘향전; Hanja: 春香傳; lit. The Story of Chunhyang or The Tale of Chunhyang) is one of the best known love stories and folk tales of Korea. It is based on the pansori Chunhyangga, the most famous of the five surviving pansori tales.

Date of composition and author are unknown and the present form took shape between 1694 and 1834.

== Main characters ==
- Seong Chunhyang (성춘향) (Spring Fragrance) is the main female character, gisaeng Wolmae's daughter. She is very beautiful and also talented in poetry and arts. She falls in love with Yi Mongryong.
- Yi Mongryong (이몽룡) is the main male character who is the son of a government official (Magistrate). He is an intelligent and handsome man. He falls in love with Chunhyang at first sight.
- Hyangdan (향단) is Chunhyang's servant. She is devoted to Chunhyang.
- Bangja (방자) is Mongryong's male servant.
- Wolmae (월매) (Moon Plum) is Chunhyang's mother who used to be a gisaeng.
- Byeon Hakdo (변학도) is the replacement official of Mongryong's father.

== Plot summary ==
Yi Mongryong, who always studies hard, goes out to get some fresh air. He sees Chunhyang on a swing and he falls in love with her at first sight. He orders his servant, Bangja, to ask Chunhyang to come to him but she refuses. Yi Mongryong then goes to talk to Chunhyang's mother, Wolmae, to ask permission to marry Chunhyang; Wolmae gives her permission and the two young people marry that day.

Yi Mongryong's father, a government official, has to move to Hanyang (Seoul now) so Yi Mongryong has to leave Chunhyang to follow his father. Chunhyang gives Yi Mongryong a ring as a token of her love for him and promises to stay faithful to him and wait for him to come back in the future and take her to Seoul. After he leaves, a replacement for Mongryong's father comes to Chunhyang's village. The new replacement is Byeon Hakdo, a greedy and selfish person who wastes his time frolicking with gisaengs. Chunhyang, renowned for her beauty, is summoned by the new magistrate. Although Chunhyang is not a gisaeng, Byeon treats her like one because her mother was a gisaeng. Byeon orders Chunhyang to work as a gisaeng for him, but Chunhyang refuses, stating that she has one true love. Byeon gets angry and imprisons her. He decides to punish her on his birthday.

Yi Mongryong wins the first place in a state examination and he becomes a secret royal inspector, or Amhaengeosa, who investigates and prosecutes corrupt government officials as an undercover emissary of the king. Under disguise, he returns to Chunhyang's village and finds out what has happened to Chunhyang and Byeon's abuse of power. Yi impersonates a beggar to conceal his identity, but despite this, Chunhyang still loves him and asks her mother to take good care of him.

Yi Mongryong barges into Byeon's birthday celebration uninvited and makes a satirical poem about Byeon's misconducts, but Byeon does not understand the poem. Yi discloses his real identity and punishes Byeon. At first, Chunhyang cannot recognize Yi and he tests her fidelity by asking her to be his gisaeng. Chunhyang, who still cannot recognize him, refuses him as well. Deeply moved by her faithfulness, Yi orders a servant to show her the ring Chunhyang gave him. She was shocked that it is actually Yi and they live happily ever after.

== Important features ==
- Love between Courtesan's daughter and Government official's son
- The selfish lord being punished by Mongryong
- Chunhyang, who keeps her integrity until the end

Like any other literature, The Tale of Chunhyang also reflects its society. Although the author is unknown, it is deducible that every nation was involved. The common people might get vicarious pleasure from the main characters who get over the difference of social standings and punish the greedy lord. Also keeping female's integrity is the traditional Korean's conservative moral.
