= Simcheongga =

Story from the Korean pansori tradition

- Hangul: 심청가
- Hanja: 沈淸歌
- Revised Romanization: Simcheongga
- McCune–Reischauer: Simch'ŏngga

Simcheongga (Korean: 심청가) is one of the five surviving stories of the Korean pansori storytelling tradition. The other stories are Chunhyangga, Heungbuga, Jeokbyeokga, and Sugungga. The characteristic of this story is that it deals with the difficult lives of ordinary people in the late Joseon Dynasty, and it contains the heroism and values of life that ordinary people wanted at that time. In the end, it is a fantasy genre in which the socially disadvantaged overcome hardships and have a dramatic happy ending.

== History ==
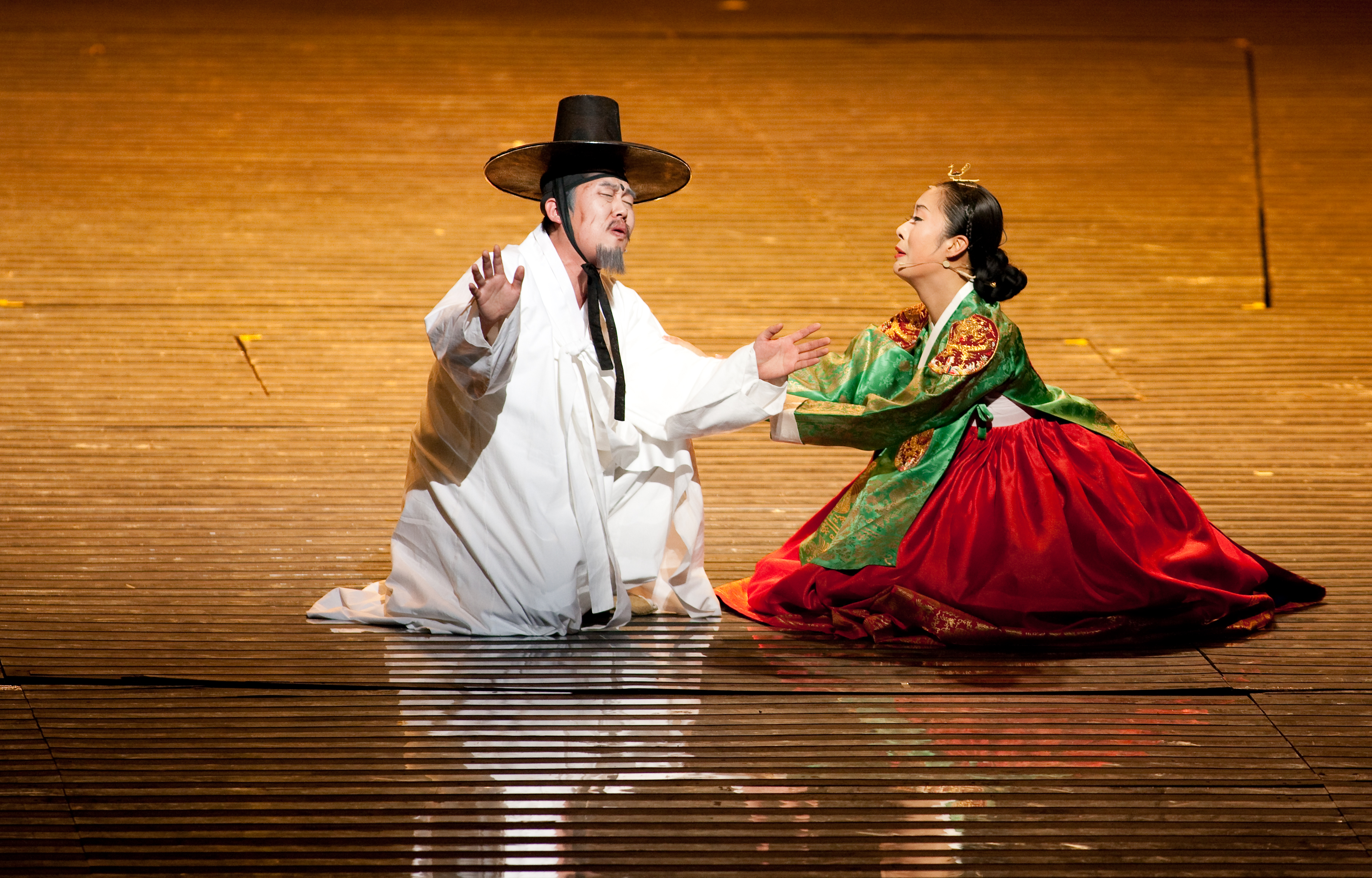
Simcheongga performance by National Theater of Korea

The exact date of when the Simcheong story was adapted into a pansori is unknown. According to records, Simcheongga can be found in the Kwanuhŭi written by Song Man-jae (송만재; 宋晩載) in the time of Sunjo of Joseon and also in The History of Joseon Traditional Opera (『조선창극사』) written Chŏng No-sik (정노식; 鄭魯湜) in the 1900s.

Simcheongga is considered to have been made a great piece of art through the contribution of pansori singers' deoneum.

Simcheongga often covers themes of tragedy and sadness.

== Story ==
There are five acts in the story. Simcheongga is about Simcheong and her father, Sim Hak-Gyu, whom people call Sim-Bongsa ('Sim the Blind'). She has to take care of her blind father.

The highlight of this pansori is when Sim-Bongsa regains his eyesight. A realistic expression of this requires a master singer. After Sim-Bongsa regains his eyesight, other blind people also recover. Finally, Simcheongga ends in a festive mood.

== Structure ==
In the section about Simcheong's birth, we hear that Simcheong was originally a heavenly woman and that she came to the real world. This suggests that Simcheong is an unreal being.

Growth and Prosperity of Simcheong: she grows up in the real world under her father's care. After she is grown, she works for wages, begs to support her father, and sells her body for 300 seoks of rice (about 54,000 liters).

Death and survival of Simcheong: here, Simcheong becomes a sacrifice to the God of the sea and jumps into the water at Indangsu. She is carried safely to the palace of the God. It is unrealistic because where people can not go at choice.

Simcheong becomes a queen in the sea world. Her father recovers his sight, and she reunites with him. Then they live happily together.

Simcheong, so, comes to the real world as an unreal being, born as a daughter of a blind man. She goes to an unreal place and comes back to the real world again after enjoying happiness. So, the setting of Simcheongjeon changes: "unreal space → real space → unreal space → real space," in a circular flow.

The contents of Simcheongjeon in view of the life of Sim-Bongsa is also circular:

- He lives with his wife and has his daughter Simcheong and lived happily, in one way.
- He loses his wife, loses his daughter, and spends days in sorrow and pain.
- He lives happily after seeing his daughter become queen and regaining his eyesight. This work ends when the happiness of 1. is changed into the suffering of 2, and this is overcome with the happiness of 3, and happiness continues. So, fortune and misfortune don’t stay permanent, but show a circular structure in which the two situations change places with each other.

The 'Circulation of the real space and the unreal space' and 'The circulation of the happiness and unhappiness in this story is based on the will to make the new real world full of happiness, abolishing the unhappy reality. Koreans had expectations and beliefs that today's hardships and misfortunes can be overcome tomorrow and they can live happily. This storyteller, therefore, made a commitment to identify the hopes and expectations of tomorrow's happiness while enjoying creating the story.

== See also ==
- Korean music
- Pansori
- Pansori gosu
- Culture of Korea
- The Tale of Sim Chong
