= Pansori gosu =

Drummer in pansori performances

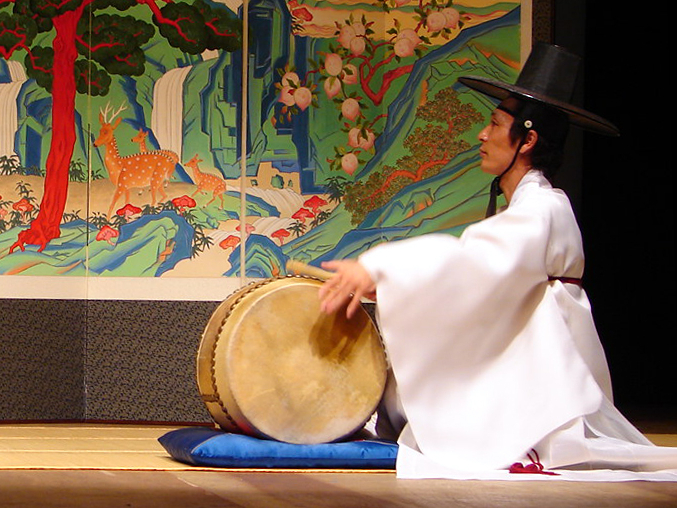
- Gosu

Korean name
- Hangul: 판소리 고수
- Hanja: 판소리 鼓手
- Revised Romanization: Pansori Gosu
- McCune–Reischauer: P'ansori Kosu

A gosu (literally "drummer") is a drummer in performances of pansori, a form of traditional Korean narrative/theater that is usually performed by just two musicians: a solo singer and a drummer. The gosu supports the sorikkun, or singer, by providing rhythms with a soribuk (pansori drum), a shallow barrel drum with a pine body and two cowhide heads. Impromptu short verbal sounds made by the gosu, called chuimsae, also play an important role.

== Famous people ==
=== Late Joseon Dynasty ===
- Song Gwang-rok (宋光祿)
- Joo Duk-gi (朱德基)

=== Japanese Colonial Period ===
- Han Sung-jun (韓成俊)

=== Recently ===
- Kim Myung-hwan(金命煥)

== See also ==
- Korean music
- Korean culture
