= Pansori =

Korean traditional musical storytelling

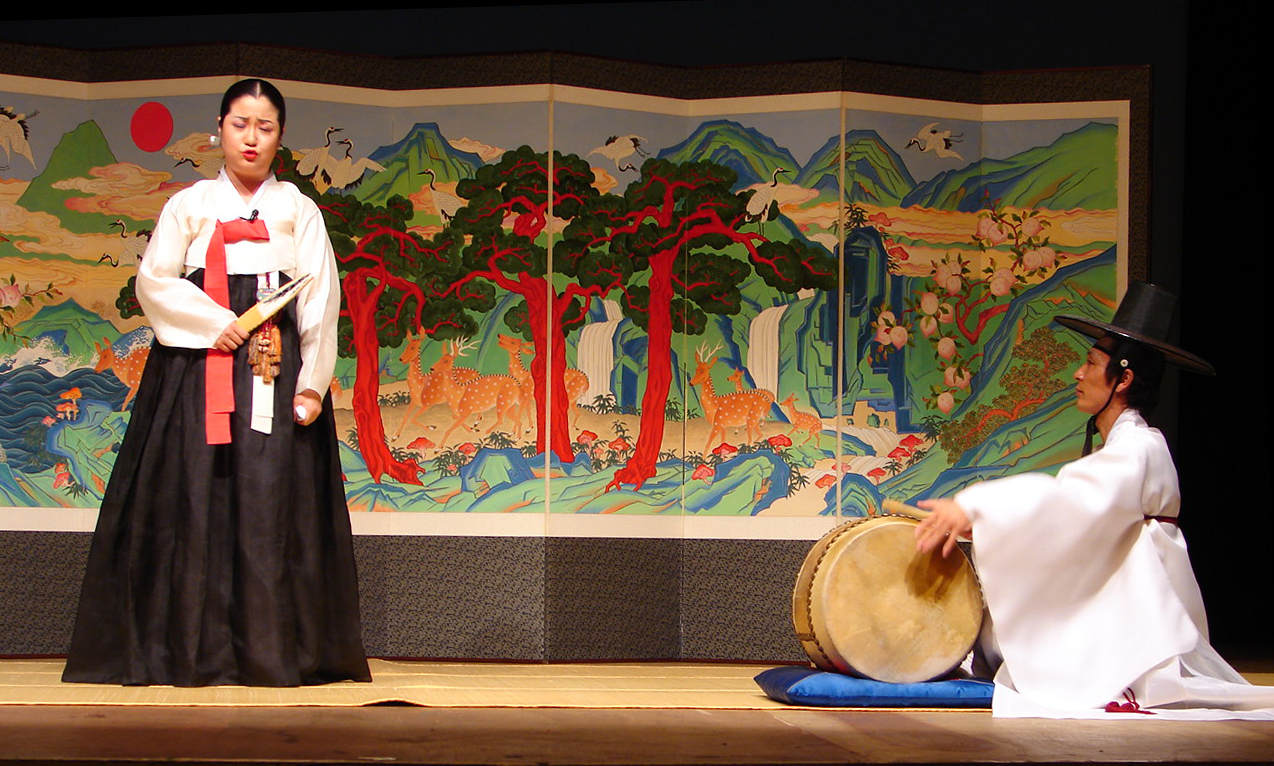
- Pansori performance at the Busan Cultural Center in Busan, South Korea

Korean name
- Hangul: 판소리
- RR: pansori
- MR: p'ansori

Pansori (Korean: 판소리) is a Korean genre of musical storytelling performed by a singer and a drummer. The term pansori is a compounds of the Korean words pan 판 and sori 소리, the latter of which means "sound." However, pan has multiple meanings, and scholars disagree on which was the intended meaning when the term was coined. One meaning is "a situation where many people are gathered." Another meaning is "a song composed of varying tones."

In music, Gugwangdae describes a long story that takes as little as three hours and as much as eight hours or more. It is one of the traditional forms of Korean music that mixes body movements and songs to the accompaniment of a buk drum played by a gosu. The dramatic content of the drama is changed according to various rhythms based on the melody of Korea's local music. Pansori was originally called the "sori", and it was called Taryeong, Japga (잡가; 雜歌), Clown Song, and Geukga (극가; 劇歌). It was also commonly used in terms such as Changgeukjo (창극조; 唱劇調).

In the late 20th century, the sorrowful "Western style" of pansori overtook the vigorous "Eastern style" of pansori, and pansori began being called the "sound of han". All surviving pansori epics end happily, but contemporary pansori focuses on the trials and tribulations of the characters, commonly without reaching a happy ending because of the contemporary popularity of excerpt performances. Such modern changes to the character of pansori, including its recent emphasis on han, have led to concern within the traditional performing community.

Pansori has been designated as Korea's National Intangible Cultural Heritage No. 5 since 1964. On November 7, 2003, pansori was registered as the UNESCO's Masterpiece of the Oral and Intangible Heritage of Humanity of Korea.

Originally a form of folk entertainment for the lower classes, pansori was embraced by the Korean elite during the 19th century. While public interest in the genre temporarily declined in the mid-20th century, today's South Korean public and government are passionate in registering and recognizing many pansori singers as "living national treasures of Korea." North Korea, on comparison, has yet to implement the systematic support of pansori at the government level, as Kim Jong Il believed that pansori's performance voice was too hoarse and did not distinguish between male and female to suit the taste of today's people.

== Name ==
Pansori is a form of musical entertainment that has persisted in Korea from the 17th century to the present day.

Jingukmyeongsan
Pansori singer Song Man-gab performed in 1934.

A related term, "pannoreum," refers to plays such as Sandae-do Gamgeuk (산대도감극; 山臺都監劇) and geundu (근두; 筋斗), as well as tightrope walking. The pansori of the Joseon Dynasty included sijo poetry (시조; 時調) accompanied by music. Therefore, it is not appropriate to refer to pansori as Changgeuk (창극; 唱劇) or Changgeukjo (창극조; 唱劇調). Changgeuk is based on the name of Pansori dramatized after Wongaksa Temple (원각사; 圓覺社), but it is not suitable for pure Pansori. Therefore, Changgeukjo is appropriate for the musical term of the song sung in Changgeuk, but it is not appropriate for the form of pansori.

"Pansori" as a musical term originated independently from the term "pannol" (pannoreum). Likewise, the literary form of this form of pansori is also called pansori. It is therefore necessary to distinguish between pansori as a musical term and pansori as a literary term, but it is still appropriate to use the term "pansori" to refer to sijo.

== Description ==
Pansori performances are performed by "Clown", "Gosu", and "Audience".

A clown sings with a fan in their right hand, and the singing part and the speaking part intersect. The singing part is called "aniri" or "broader" in terms of sound and speech, which is called "applied" or "spacious."

Gosu is another important component of the performance that plays drums. As the expression "one Gosu two master singers" is often used, in the soundboard, a singer and a clown lead the game together. The drummer beats the emotional circuit of the song and adds more charm to the performance.

Rather than listening quietly, the audience adds a "Chu-imsae".

=== Pansori repertoire ===
During the 18th century, 12 song cycles, or madang (마당), were established as the repertoire of pansori stories. Those stories were compiled in Song Man-jae's Gwanuhi (관우희) and Jeong No-sik's Joseon Changgeuksa (조선창극사).

Of the 12 original madang, only five are currently performed. They are as follows.

- Chunhyangga
- Simcheongga
- Heungbuga
- Sugungga
- Jeokbyeokga

Contemporary performances of the madang differ greatly from the original works. Rather than performing an entire madang, which can take up to 10 hours, musicians may only perform certain sections, highlighting the most popular parts of a madang.

=== Transmission ===
Pansori training has historically been conducted through one-on-one apprenticeships with pansori masters. Apprentices first learn to perform in the style of their teacher before developing their own personal style and technique. Significant time and care is taken to memorize and internalize the repertoire.

=== Relationship between Shaman songs and Pansori ===
If Pansori comes from a shaman's husband, a clown, the musical wish should be saved in their connection. The rhythm of the unearned value shared by "Lee Bo-hyung" is as follows:

1. Sinawi-Gwon: This is called the "Yukja-baegi-jo" and belongs to the southern part of the Han River in Gyeonggi-do and Chungcheong-do and Jeolla-do provinces.

2. Menarizo : This is called an "Sanyuhwa-garak", and "Gyeongsang-do" and "Gangwon-do" provinces belong to it.

3. Susimga·Sanyeombuljo: "Pyeongan-do" and "Hwanghae-do" provinces

4. Changbu Taryeong ·Noraegarakjo: belong to Muga in northern Gyeonggi Province, Kaesong, Seoul, Cheorwon, and Yangju.

In addition, there is a theory that "Gyeong-dereum" is similar to the rhythm of the northern Gyeonggi Muga's Changbu Taryeong.

Again, the rhythm of Pansori has a tempo from the slow beat of Jinyangjo, Jungmori, Jungjungmori, Jajinmori, Hwimori, Ujungmori, etc. It is necessary to value the term "Mori" that appears here. In other words, if you compare Salpuri Gut in Jeolla-do Province, which is called Sinai Gijo, and Do Salmori, Balae in Gyeonggi-do and Chungcheong-do provinces, the sound of goso sung by clowns is Jungmori, especially in old Hongpagosa and Antaek.

Therefore, it is the Muga of Hongpae Gosa, Seongjo, and Antaek, which are called by this southern clown, that is, the theory that pansori was produced in the clowns of Chungcheong-do. This is a problem that needs to be further clarified in the future, but even from this, it can be seen that the reasoning that pansori came from the reading voice that some argue is vain. Since clowns are folk singers, it would be right to say that they assimilated various folk songs based on the rhythm of these mugas and completed them. However, even if the song was originally adopted at the time of its establishment, it would have refined in the process of transmission and developed a new style as a pansori, which seems to be the result of this effort.

== History ==
=== Origins: 17th century ===
Pansori is thought to have originated in the late 17th century during the Joseon Dynasty. The earliest performers of pansori were most likely shamans and street performers, and their audiences were lower-class people. It is unclear where in the Korean Peninsula pansori originated, but the Honam region eventually became the site of its development.

=== Expansion and golden age: 18th–19th centuries ===
It is believed that pansori was embraced by the upper classes around the mid-18th century. One piece of evidence that supports this belief is that Yu Jin-han, a member of the yangban upper class, recorded the text of Chunhyangga, a famous pansori he saw performed in Honam in 1754, indicating that the elite attended pansori performances by this time.

The golden age of pansori is considered to be the 19th century when the genre's popularity increased and its musical techniques became more advanced. During the first half of the 19th century, pansori singers incorporated folk songs into the genre, while using vocal techniques and melodies intended to appeal to the upper class. Purely humorous pansori also became less popular than pansori that combined humorous and tragic elements.

Major developments in this period were made by pansori researcher and patron Shin Jae-hyo. He reinterpreted and compiled songs to fit the tastes of the upper class and also trained the first notable female singers, including Jin Chae-seon, who is considered to be the first female master of pansori.

Western performing arts first made their way to Korea in the late nineteenth century. Jeong Du-won brought Western music concept to Korea for the first time in 1632. He became familiar with Western music via the teachings of Chinese Catholic priests. Lee Eun-Dol, the first Korean to study Western music at the Japanese Army's staff sergeant school, began coaching bugle bands in Seoul in 1882. Seo Sang's 1884 presentation of Yun's religious music, notably protestant songs, also had a considerable effect.

=== Decline: early 20th century ===
In the early 20th century, pansori experienced several notable changes. It was more frequently performed indoors and staged similarly to Western operas. It was recorded and sold on vinyl records for the first time. The number of female singers grew rapidly, supported by organizations of kisaeng. And the tragic tone of pansori was intensified, due to the influence of the Japanese occupation of Korea on the Korean public and performers. In an attempt to suppress Korean culture, the Japanese government often censored pansori that referred to the monarchy or to Korean nationalism.

=== Preservation and resurgence: late 20th century to present ===
In addition to Japanese censorship, the rise of cinema and changgeuk, and the turmoil of the Korean War all contributed to pansori's decreasing popularity by the mid-20th century. To help preserve the tradition of pansori, the South Korean government declared it an Intangible Cultural Property in 1964. Additionally, performers of pansori began to be officially recognized as "living national treasures." This contributed to a resurgence of interest in the genre beginning in the late 1960s.

UNESCO proclaimed the pansori tradition a Masterpiece of the Oral and Intangible Heritage of Humanity on November 7, 2003.

The number of pansori performers has increased substantially in the 21st century, though the genre has struggled to find wide public appeal, and pansori audiences are composed mostly of older people, scholars or students of traditional music, and the elite. However, pansori fusion music, a trend that began in the 1990s, has continued in the 21st century, with musicians creating combinations including pansori-reggae, pansori-classical music, and pansori-rap.

Orthodox Pansori performances in well-known places and on traditional theater stages are commonplace. Tradition-based theater and full-length performances in one of the many recognized specialty sectors of Orthodox Pansori are all included within the government of Korea's cultural conservation program, which includes Orthodox Pansori. The performances take place on well-known theater stages, recalling the excitement of older times of court and market entertainment. On the other side, dramatic platforms raise the performers above the audience. In the past, Pansori gave equal importance to the performers and the audience.

Touristic Pansori is a term that refers to renowned Pansori singers doing short acts of traditional Pansori performance with other kinds of music, such as religious music. Often, the many short performances have nothing in common, like when court music or religious dances are combined with Pansori. International visitors and visitors from other regions of Korea make up the bulk of the audience. The objective is to make Pansori accessible to a broad audience that is unfamiliar with its norms or with the significance of the tradition to the Korean people.

There are recent Pansori-themed films such as "Seopyeonje (1993), "Hwimori (1994)" and "The Millennium Studies (2007)".

== Elements and styles ==
There are five elements for the musical style of pansori: jo (조; 調); jangdan (장단; 長短); buchimsae (붙임새); je (제; 制); and vocal production.

- Jo (조; 調, also spelled cho) refers mostly to the melodic framework of a performance. In terms of music in Western culture, it comparable to the mode and key, though jo also includes the vocal timbre and emotions expressed through singing. Types of jos include: chucheonmok (추천목; 鞦韆-); Gyemyeonjo (계면조; 界面調; also called seoreumjo 서름조, aewonseong 애원성); seokhwaje (석화제); and seolleongje (설렁제).
- Jangdan (장단; 長短) is the rhythmic structure used. Jangdan is used to show emotional states corresponding to the narration of the singer. Jangdan is also used with the appearances of certain characters. Some types include: jinyang (진양); jungjungmori (중중모리); jajinmori (자진모리); and hwimori (휘모리)
- Buchimsae (붙임새) refers to the method in which words in pansori are combined with the melodies. The meaning refers more specifically to combinations of words with irregular rhythms. The word is a combination of two Korean words, buchida (붙이다; lit. 'to combine') and sae (새; lit. 'appearance, form'). The two types of buchimsae are: daemadi daejangdan (대마디 대장단) and eotbuchim (엇붙임).
- Je (제; 制) refers to a style of pansori.

=== Styles ===
Pansori's style originated from the division of relations and regions of origin, with the establishment of the flow, singing and theory of each song over a long period of time, leading to the formation of several small branches that diverged from the great stem. Pansori's style was largely classified as the two major mountains of East and West Pyeonje, and expressing style in Pansori was in line with the classification of Yupa in Sijo, Yeongje, Wanje, and Naepoje.

Pansori can be divided into Junggoje, in addition to Dongpyeonje and Seopyeonje, depending on the region.

Dongpyeonje was based on Unbong, Gurye, Sunchang, and Heungdeok areas, which are east of the Seomjingang River, and it is magnificent and vigorous, and features a simple display of natural volume without any finesse. Aniri has not developed for a long time, has little application, and is a sound material that is carried out by relying on the voice of the neck. Instead of "the Great Leader," they stick together to the rhythm.

Seopyeonje refers to the sound of Confucian scholars in Naju, Haenam, and Boseong, west of the Seomjingang River, and is the standard of Park Yu-jeon's legislation. The musical characteristics are mainly used to portray sad and resentful feelings, and to portray sophisticated, colorful, and tantalizing sounds.

Junggoje is another style, where the sound begins at a medium tone and starts flat at a relatively low voice when the window is opened, increases the middle, and lowers the voice when the limit is reached. It is clear that the sound is high and low, so you can hear it clearly, and the tune is monotonous and simple.

== Pansori's Mok and Sung ==
In Pansori, a person's voice quality, singing style, and the type of tune are called by a certain ‘Mok’ and ‘Sung’. Usually, the ‘Mok’ is deeply related to the type of tune and singing, and the ’Sung’ is deeply related to the quality of sound.

Norang Mok means to lightly vocalize and dye the tune, which means to use the decoration or singing method. But master singers are reluctant to do so. Waega-jip Mok means the use of a tone or temporary listening rather than the general composition of that tone.

Soori Sung refers to the sound quality of a master singer who is a bit rough and hoarse. Examples include Song Man-gap and Jeong Jeong-ryul.

== Terms ==
- Changja: Also known as a singer, it means a person who sings in pansori.
- Gosu: It means a person who beats the drum near the intestines and adds Chuimse.
- Gui-myeongchang: Pansori means a person who enjoys a spear properly.
- Balim: It means to take action according to the rhythm or editorial content. Some people use a fan.
- Chuimse: It means that the audience or master speaks "Ulssu" or "good" to create an atmosphere and entertain the audience.
- Aniri: The Changja talk as usual, not to the beat.
- Noereum sae: Pansori refers to the acting ability to make the audience laugh and cry.* Duneum: It refers to a characteristic part or musical style that is inherited according to Pansori's Confucianism.
- Doseop: Pansori to the middle form of a sing and an aniri.
- Duek-eum :Set the voice: The musical competence of the pansori intestines refers to the completed state.

== Pansori masterpiece singer ==
Pansori masterpiece refers to a person who sings exceptionally well in the intestines of Pansori.

The best literature of Pansori is "Chunhyangga," which was published in "The Cartoon House" by Yu Jin (1711-1791).

The best singers of Pansori were Uchundae, Kwon Sam-deuk, and Moheung-gap, who appeared in "Guanwoohee" of Song Man-jae, and Hahandam, who appeared in "Gapsin Wanmun", and were from the reign of King Yeongjo and King Jeongjo of modern Joseon. There must have been a masterpiece of pansori even before Uchundae and Haundam, but it remains only in the literature or is not oralized.

During the reign of King Sunjo, outstanding masters came out to form various groups in pansori, including Kwon Sam-deuk, Hwanghaecheon, Songheungrok, Bangmanchun, Yeom Gye-dal, Moheunggap, Kim Gye-cheol, Gosogwan, Sin Man-yeop, Song Gwang-rok, and Judeokgi. Eight of these are called eight people. The names of these master singers are also seen in Shin Jae-hyo's "The Clown." From this time on, a "sori clown" focusing on sound appeared, distinguishing it from a traditional "aniri clown" focusing on "aniri."

The early days of King Cheoljong and King Gojong corresponded to the heyday of pansori. Famous singers such as Park Yu-jeon, Park Man-soon, Lee Il-chi, Kim Se-jong, Song Woo-ryong, Jeong Start-up, Jung Chun-pung, Kim Chang-rok, Jang Ja-baek, Kim Chan-up, and Lee Chang-yoon came out to lead Pansori to a highly artistic level. They formed various factions based on the relationship between private affairs and regional delay, and eight of them were selected as the late eight singers.

At the end of King Gojong's reign and at the beginning of his schedule, Pansori was the fruit of Pansori. On the other hand, after Wonggeuk became popular after Wongaksa Temple, Pansori began to sprout. As the master singers of each region moved in and out of each other, pansori's yupa gradually lost its distinctiveness. The famous singers who were active during this period include Park Ki-hong, Kim Chang-hwan, Kim Chae-man, Song Man-gap, Lee Dong-baek, Yu Gong-ryul, Jeon Do-seong, Kim Chang-ryong, Yoo Seong-jun, and Jeong-ryul. Five of these master singers are called five master singers.

Right behind the five singers were Jang Pan-gae, Yi Sun-yu, Kim Jeong-moon, Park Jung-geun, Gong Chang-sik, Yi Hwa Jung-sun, Im Bo-le, and Gang Jang-won. They played a major role in the Joseon Vocal Research Society, but were swept away by Changgeuk and pushed by Western music, and Pansori began to retreat.

Later master singers include Park Nok-ju, Kim Yeon-soo, Jeong Gwang-soo, Kim Yeo-ran, Park Cho-wol, Kim So-hee, Park Bong-sul, Park Dong-jin, Jung Kwon-jin, Han Seung-ho, Han Ae-soon, and Jang Young-chan. They are trying to revive the disappearing pansori, but they are in danger of disappearing without proper measures from the government and society. Among them, Kim So-hee, Park Cho-wol, Park Bong-sul, Park Nok-ju, Kim Yeon-soo, Jeong Gwang-soo, Kim Yeo-ran, Jeong Gwon-jin, and Han Seung-ho were designated as intangible cultural assets.

After the death of the first generation of national intangible cultural assets, Jo Sang-hyeon, Park Song-hee, Song Soon-seop, Seongwuhyang, Sung Chang-soon, Oh Jeong-sook, Han Nong-seon, Namhae-seong, Shin Yeong-hee, and Kim Il-gu were designated as second generation intangible cultural assets. Following them, Jeong Soon-im, Kim Soo-yeon, Kim Young-ja, Inancho, Jeong Hoe-seok, and Yoon Jin-cheol were designated as third-generation national intangible cultural assets. In addition, there are numerous master singers such as Yoo Soo-jeong, Wang Ki-chul, Chae Soo-jeong, Yoo Mi-ri, Lee Ju-eun, Yeom Kyung-ae, and Jang Moon-hee.

== Themes ==
The stories described in Pansori all link to a distinct moral issue of people: Chunhyangga, Simcheongga, and Heungboga. Each tale teaches a valuable lesson and illustrates the ancient Koreans' believe in karma in their own unique way.

Chunhyang relates the tale of a girl who was born into a humble household but transformed herself after marrying the governor's son. She subsequently rejected and resisted another governor's pressure. The narrative concludes with her husband rescuing her when she demonstrates the purity, love, and unity of individuals from many social classes.

Simcheongga emphasizes filial piety, chastity, and fortitude. Simcheong was freed by the King of the Sea as a compassionate act, and she met and married the king of her realm, whom she had sacrificed herself to restore his sight. When she organizes a blind party, she stumbles across his father. Her father's sight is restored as a result of her tremendous love and devotion. The song underlines the significance of parents and children developing a solid bond.

Heungboga's lessons underscore the pitfalls of human avarice. Heungbo's aid to a swallow with a broken leg pays off. His wicked brother, too, breaks a swallow's leg and does lovely things, but he pays for his actions. In this song, morality and goodness are praised, while wickedness is punished. This song teaches people this.

== Pansori Changbon ==
"Pansori" is one of Korea's unique art forms that convey theatrical effects to those who see it as a sound in line with Gosu's drumming while clowns holding Hapjukseon in one hand beautifully and mixing all kinds of broadness. Just as there must be a script for the play to be staged, there must be a Pansori editorial before that to make Pansori sound by clowns, and the document that records the Pansori editorial is called the Pansori Changbon. In other words, in pansori, Changbon has the characteristics of a play in a play.

However, there is a great feature in the Pansori version that plays do not have, which is that plays can be performed by anyone, while there is a specific version of the Pansori version for clowns. These windows are called "famous" and are distinguished from "unknown" versions without specific clowns. For example, "Song Man-gap Changbon" refers to the Pansori document sung by Song Man-gap. However, Song Man-gap is not his own creative work. Of course, it may be the work of a clown himself, but it is usually built by an outstanding scholar or supporter. Because most clowns had no writing skills. Thus, the established versions are usually oral transcriptions, which have been inherited from later generations, or were built by civil servants for certain clowns.

The original version of Pansori is sometimes produced in various ways during the transmission process. In other words, there is a slight (sometimes significant) variation in the content of the book, which has been handed down for hundreds of years to this day. For example, the early "Chunhyangga" could have been sung in three hours, but today, the content was greatly added enough to sing eight and a half hours.

Even if the original version of Pansori is the original copy of Dongil genealogy, many versions are gradually derived. As the first literature on the twelve yards of pansori, Song Man-jae's "Gwanwoohee" is currently cited, and there is no way to know which clown it belonged to before the 1810s because there is no technology on the original version. This does not mean that there is a clear record in the post-1810 literature. However, there are several copies or copies of the transcripts held by individuals because they are based on the oral tradition.

== Similar cultures ==
Musical storytelling of literature like pansori was a concept that was prevalent in both the East and the West during the ancient times.

In Vietnam, the ca tru singing (Vietnamese: [kaː ʈû], 歌籌, "tally card songs"), also known as hát cô đầu or hát nói, is a Vietnamese genre of musical storytelling performed by a featuring female vocalist, with origins in northern Vietnam. For much of its history, it was associated with a pansori-like form of entertainment, which combined entertaining wealthy people as well as performing religious songs for the royal court.

In Europe, there was also a group of minstrel poets after the Middle Ages. In France, the matrimonial poem "changson de geste" was sung by monks in non-Latin slang (lingua romana) for pilgrims, and romance was also developed in the form of singing for several people in squares and salons. This form of epic poetry was created by the collaboration of literature and music of any people. This is a common medieval literary form from the 10th century to the 14th and 5th centuries, and Korean pansori is characterized by novels formed by letters first, and this pansori form was characterized by the 18th century.

== Gallery ==
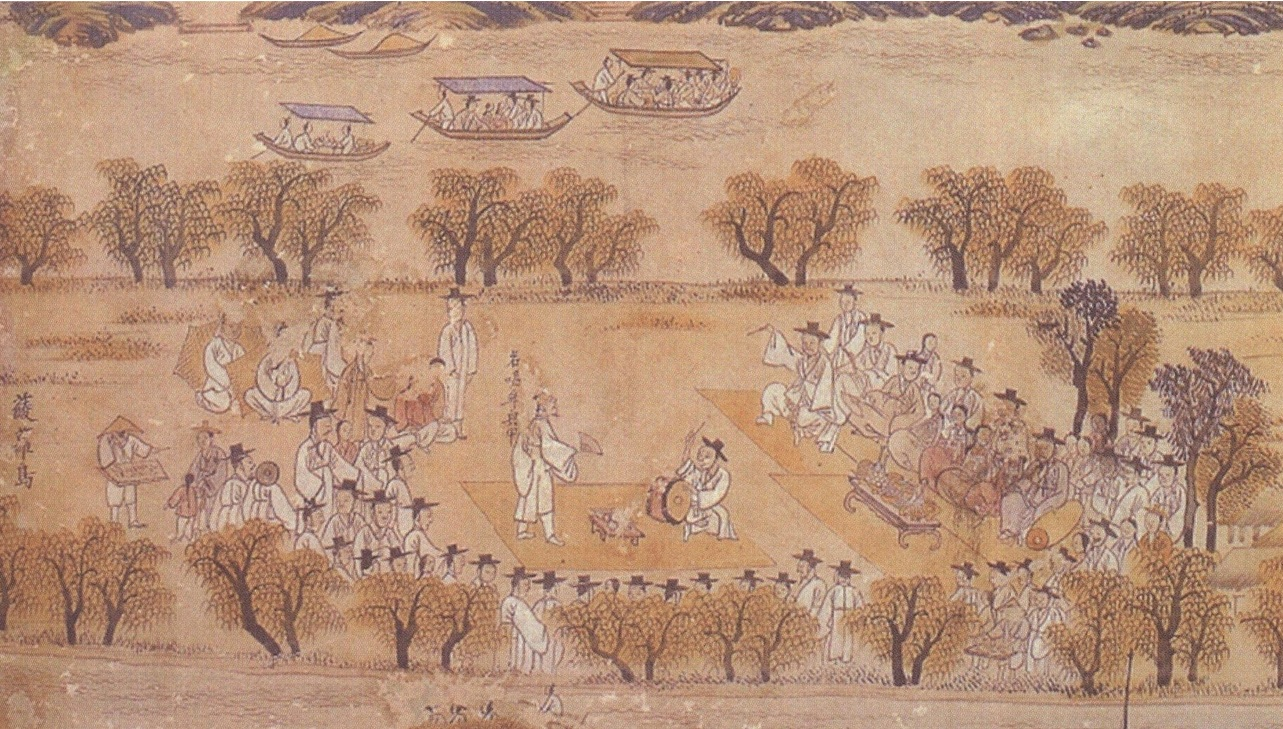
A painting depicting a pansori performance, 19th century.

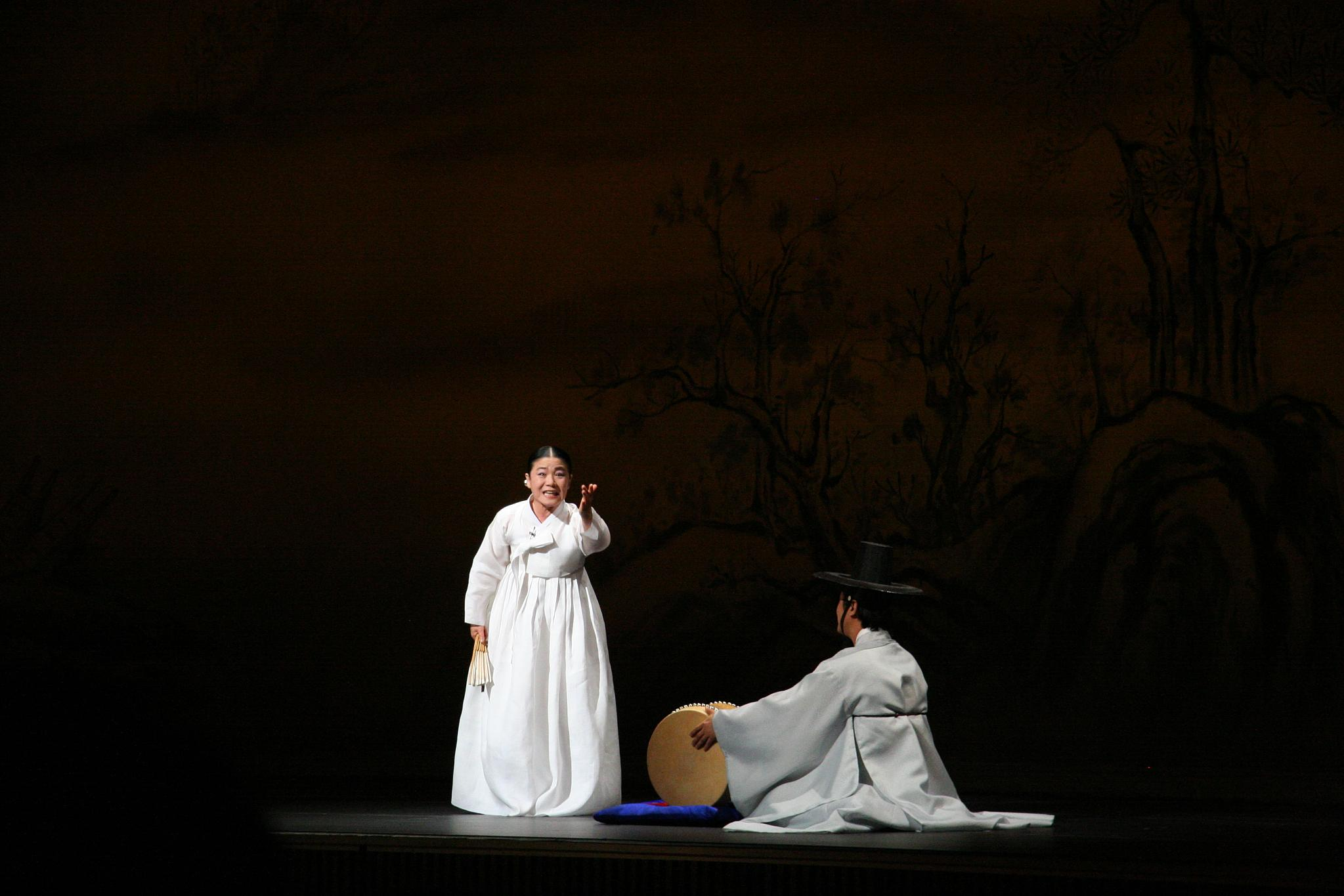
Heungbuga performed by Ahn Suk-seon in Seoul, 2006.

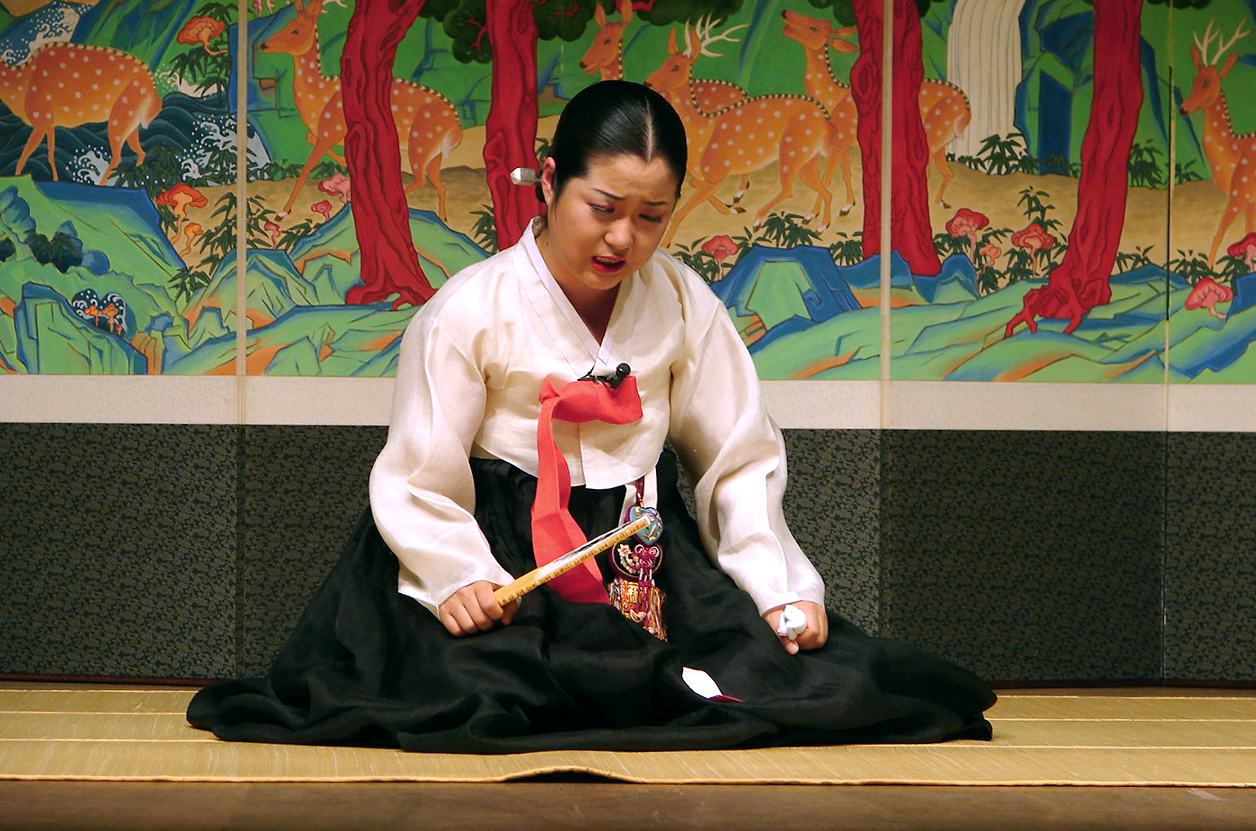
Pansori performance at the Busan Cultural Center in Busan, 2006.

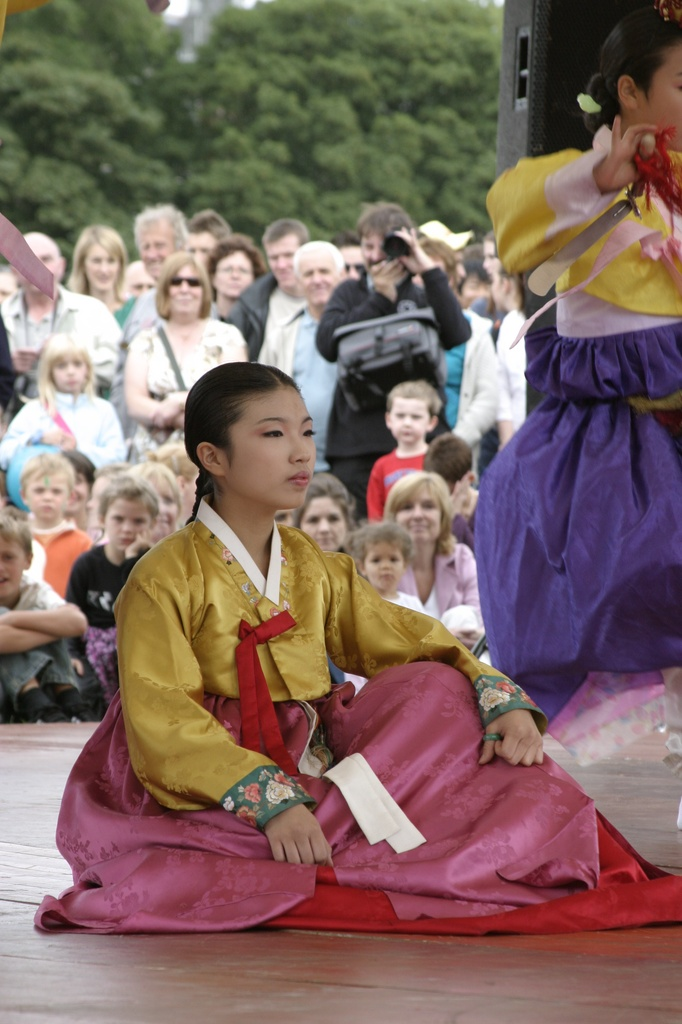
A young Pansori singer in Edinburgh, Scotland, 2006.

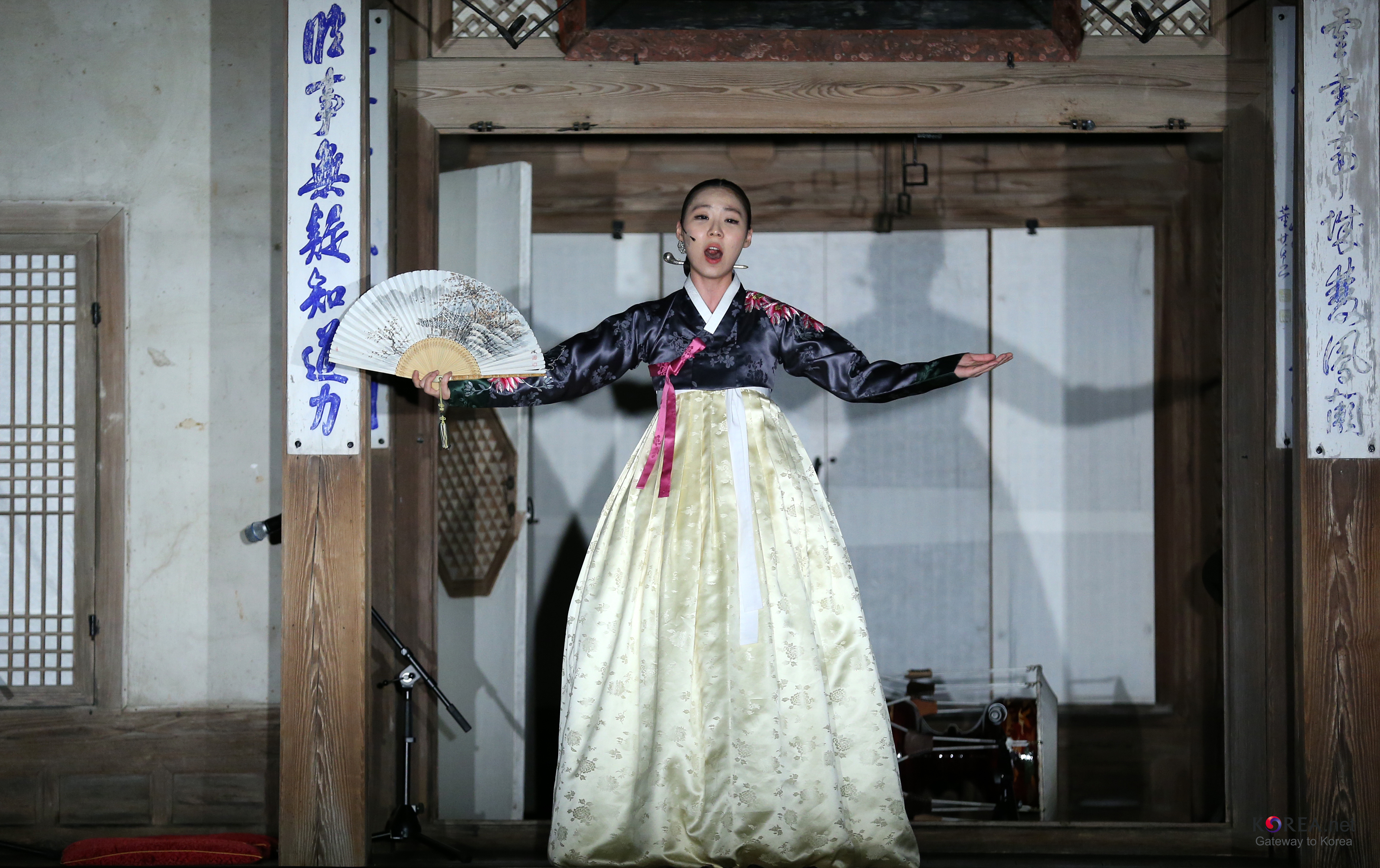
Pansori performance at the Changdeokgung Palace in Seoul, 2013.

== Notable pansori singers ==
- Jin Chae-seon
- Kim So-hee
- Oh Jeong-suk
- Pak Tongjin
- Ahn Sook-sun
- Cho Su-Hwang

== See also ==
- Korean music
- Changgeuk
- Seopyeonje
