= Chunhyangga =

Traditional Korean musical story (pansori)

- Hangul: 춘향가
- Hanja: 春香歌
- Revised Romanization: Chunhyangga
- McCune–Reischauer: Ch'unhyangga

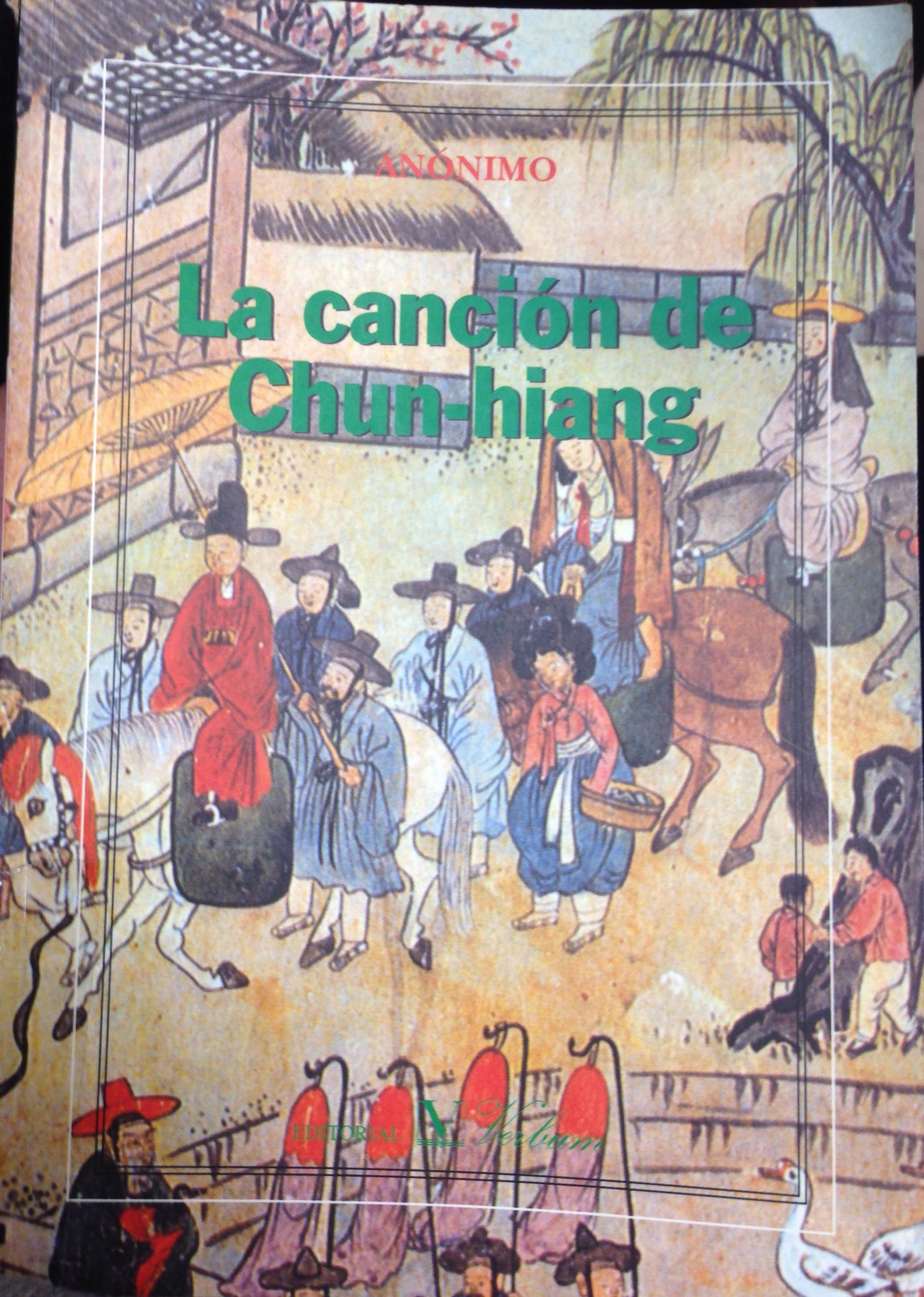
Book cover for La canción de Chun-hiang (Chunhyangga)

Chunhyangga (Korean: 춘향가) is a pansori folktale from Korea. Being a pansori, Chunhyangga is a narrative art form, and is traditionally performed by two people: a singer and drummer. There is also a story based on the Chunhyangga pansori called Chunhyangjeon.

It is now one of five surviving Pansoris in Korea, each focusing on one of the Five Confucian virtues. The other remaining stories are Simcheongga, Heungbuga, Jeokbyeokga and Sugungga.

Among these, Chunhyangga is the longest. In 1969, pansori master singer Park Dong-jin sang Chunhyangga for eight hours (surprising his audience). The original version of Chunhyangga was not that long, but has been greatly developed over time. The diverse pansori singers who have performed it have contributed famous deoneum, so it is valuable musically and historically.

There are no records confirming the exact time when Chunhyangga was written. Chunhyangga can be found in Manwhajip written by Yu Jin-han during the Joseon Dynasty, as well as in Mugeukhangrok of the same era written by Juik-Yang. Therefore, it supposed that Chunhyangga has existed since before Sukjong of Joseon (1661–1720).

== Plot ==
Set in Namwon in the Jeolla province, Chunhyangga tells the story of love between Chunhyang (춘향), the daughter of a kisaeng entertainer, and Yi Mongryong (이몽룡), the son of a magistrate. After the two are illegally married, Mongryong is forced to go to Seoul and live with his father. Since their marriage must remain a secret due to class constraints, Chunhyang must remain behind when a corrupt local magistrate, Byeon the vicious (변학도), attempts to force her to be his concubine. She refuses due to her love and loyalty to Mongryong, and is faced with death, but is rescued at the last minute by Mongryong returning in his new role as a secret royal inspector.

When performed, Chunhyangga is composed of seven parts, each with a different feeling conveyed by the singer:

1. Yi Mongryong and Chunhyang's first meeting at Gwang Hanru.
2. Mongryong and Chunhyang's love.
3. Mongryong and Chunhyang's parting.
4. Byeon's tyranny and Chunhyang's imprisonment.
5. Mongryong wins first place in a state examination and meets Chunhyang again.
6. Byeon is punished and Mongryong and Chunhyang live a long and happy life.
7. Mongryong is officially married to Chunhyang.

== Story Themes ==
Perhaps the most agreed-upon interpretation of Chunhyangga is a resistance to aristocracy. The Joseon Dynasty was heavily rooted in Confucian values. As such, the story deals with 2 of the 3 Fundamental Bonds within Confucian ideology: ruler to subject, and husband to wife. Chunhyang defies the command of her direct authority, the evil magistrate, in favor of remaining faithful to Mongryong. In the end, her loyalty is rewarded, and her marriage to someone of a higher class is legitimized- making this a tale that defies the societal norms of the time period.

Another theme present is that of Han, the concept of longstanding suffering and resentment in Korean people due to the group's history of oppression. Chunhyang is tortured by her oppressor and endures deep suffering, a euphemism for the Han that Koreans have faced throughout their existence.

== Modern adaptations ==
The story has been adapted into films, the most recent being Im Kwon-taek's Chunhyang in 2000. It was also the basis of the successful Korean romantic comedy series Sassy Girl Chun-hyang.

It has also been converted to a successful children's musical, performed in English by Theater Seoul entirely by children and youth. This show has been brought to the Edinburgh Fringe Festival twice, once to the Underbelly (2006) and once to C venues (2007).

Legend of Chun Hyang, a manga by Clamp, is loosely based on this story.

Sugar Rush Ride, a single by South Korean boy band Tomorrow x Together (Big Hit Music, 2023) borrows some of its lyrics from Chunhyangga.

The couple also appeared in the Korean/Japanese manhwa Shin angyo onshi adapting story parts of the original song.

== See also ==
- Korean folklore
- Korean literature
- Korean music
- Pansori
- Pansori gosu
- Culture of Korea
