= Kŭmo sinhwa =

15th century Korean novella collection

Kŭmo sinhwa (Korean: 금오신화; Hanja: 金鰲新話; lit. '"Tales of Mount Kŭmo", "New Stories of the Golden Turtle", "New Tales Written in Mount Kŭmo"') is a collection of novellas, written in Chinese characters by a Korean author Kim Sisŭp (who was born during the reign of Sejong the Great). Like most of the early literature of Korea it forms part of the Chinese-language literature of Korea.

The title comes from Kŭmo-san, the Mount of the Golden Turtle, today called Namsan (Gyeongju), which was the site of the Yongjang Temple where tradition records that Kim wrote the stories. The novel is written after the Chinese Jiandeng Xinhua (Tales while trimming the lampwick, 1378) of Qu You, but is not simply a pasticcio of the works contained in Jiandeng Xinhua.

There are five fantasy novellas (傳奇小說, chŏn'gi sosŏl) in this collection: Manboksa chŏp'o ki (萬福寺樗蒲記 Account of a chŏp'o game at Manbok Temple), Yi-saeng kyujang chŏn (李生窺墻傳 Biography of Scholar Yi who peered over the wall), Ch'wiyu pubyŏkchŏng ki (醉遊浮碧亭記 Travel record of a drunken excursion to Pubyŏk Pavilion), Namyŏmbuju chi (南炎浮洲志 Gazetteer of the southern continent Yŏmbu), and Yonggung puyŏn nok (龍宮赴宴錄 Story about an Invitation to a Feast in the Dragon Palace).

== Authorship ==
The author of Kŭmo sinhwa is Kim Sisŭp. His courtesy name is Yŏlgyŏng (悅卿), and he used pen names Ch'ŏnghanja (淸寒子), Maewŏltang (梅月堂), and Tongbongsanin (東峯山人). Born in a village to the north of the Sungkyunkwan, the foremost educational institution in Korea during the late Goryo and Joseon dynasties, Kim was an exceptionally bright child. He gained fame as a five-year-old who was able to read and comprehend the Great Learning and the Doctrine of the Mean. There is a well-known anecdote about King Sejong, who upon hearing about Kim's genius summoned Kim to the palace to grant him silk and encourage his talent.

In 1455, at the age of 17, Kim gave up his studies and became a Buddhist monk upon hearing that King Danjong abdicated the throne to his uncle Grand Prince Suyang. King Danjong came to the throne at the age of 12, and his uncle Grand Prince Suyang started a revolt (癸酉靖難 Kyeyu chŏngnan) in 1453 to eliminate the king’s close associates, seized power, and ultimately usurped the throne from King Danjong three years after he came to the throne. When this happened, Kim lost his will to enter government service. Instead, he pretended to be insane and led a life of a vagabond. After some time, six loyalist courtiers were killed for plotting to reinstate King Danjong to the throne, and, in one anecdote, Kim collected the corpses of the dead courtiers that people were too afraid to go near and buried them in Noryangjin. The six courtiers who were killed are known as Sayuksin, and Kim Sisŭp became one of the Saengyuksin (生六臣 six subjects who survived and stayed loyal to King Danjong).

After wandering from place to place and writing poetry and prose, Kim settled in Mount Kŭmo and lived as a Buddhist monk. He participated in the project for translating Buddhist scriptures that King Sejo started. It is assumed that Kim wrote Kŭmo sinhwa at this time, when Kim was between the ages of 31 and 36 (1465-1470).

After King Sejo died and was succeeded by King Seongjong, Kim began to study the Confucian Classics again in hopes of entering government service under the new king and contacted So Kojong, who was in a high government position at the time. However, unable to enter government service, he went into hiding once again to study Buddhism and Taoism and write poetry and prose. After years of wanderings, Kim fell ill at Muryang Temple in Mount Hong in 1493 and died at the age of 59.

== Plots ==
Kŭmo sinhwa contains five novellas written in Chinese characters. They are all fantasy stories about people experiencing supernatural or unrealistic events.

Manboksa chŏp'o ki is a story about a young man surnamed Yang, who is orphaned at an early age. While leading a solitary life at Manbok Temple, he wins a game of chŏp'o against the Buddha and marries a beautiful woman. But the woman is actually a ghost who died during an invasion and has to go to the underworld soon. After parting with his ghost wife, Yang mourns her and spends the rest of his life alone and unmarried.

Yi-saeng kyujang chŏn tells the love story of Yi and Lady Ch'oe. One day, on his way to study the Confucian Classics, Yi happens to look over a wall surrounding a house. He sees Lady Ch'oe and falls in love with her. The two exchange love poems and eventually marry. But soon after their marriage, Lady Ch'oe is killed during the Red Turban Rebellion. However, the dead Lady Ch'oe comes home to Yi, and even though Yi knows that she is a ghost he leads a happy life with her as before. After three or four years, Lady Ch'oe leaves this world, and several months later Yi falls ill and dies.

Ch'wiyu pubyŏkchŏng ki is a story about a young man surnamed Hong who visits Pyeongyang Castle, where he recites poetry in drunken happiness and meets a seonnyeo (fairy). The fairy tells him about herself: she is the daughter of the sage king Gija of Gojoseon, who when Wiman usurped the throne began to wander aimlessly and eventually became a fairy. She composes and recites poetry with Hong and leaves at daybreak. Afterward, Hong falls ill, longing to see the fairy again, and passes away, dreaming of becoming an immortal deity.

Namyŏmbuju chi is a story about a dream of a young man surnamed Pak, who was studying for the civil service examination during the reign of King Sejo. He is skeptical about the teachings of the Buddha and the existence of ghosts. Then one day, he dreams about going to South Yŏmbu, which is one of the Buddhist hells. There he meets Yŏmna, the King of the Underworld. After conversing with Pak about Buddhism, ghosts, politics, and a variety of other topics, Yŏmna is impressed by Pak's knowledge and passion and succeeds his throne to him. Pak wakes from his dream but soon falls ill and dies. After his death, immortal beings appear in the dreams of Pak's neighbors and tell them that Pak will be the next king of the Underworld.

Yonggung puyŏn nok tells a story about a young man surnamed Han who was known for his writing skills in the Goryeo Dynasty visiting the underwater Dragon Palace at the invitation of the Dragon King who lives at the Pakyŏn Falls. One evening, Han is led by two court officials to the Dragon Palace, where the Dragon King praises Han of his reputation and requests him to write a letter for ceremonies marking the completion of the foundations of a building (sangnyangmun). After writing the letter, Han enjoys a feast and has a tour of the palace. Upon returning home, he realizes that everything that happened was just a dream. Han then goes into the mountains and lives like a hermit.

== Features and significance ==
=== Chŏn'gi sosŏl (fantasy fiction) ===
Kŭmo sinhwa is an early Korean fiction, considered to have perfected the conventions of a chŏn'gi (fantasy) novel. Chŏn'gi (傳奇) is a genre of classical Chinese literature originating from Tang China. Chŏn'gi novels were and enjoyed in countries in the East Asian Sinosphere, such as Korea, Japan, and Vietnam. As it combines lyricism with narrative and is written in a variety of styles, it is fundamentally a literary genre appreciated by intellectuals of the time.

Korean intellectuals began to write chŏn'gi novels in the late Silla and early Goryeo dynasties. But as the genre was created in connection with sŏlhwa (folk narratives), early chŏn'gi fiction from this time period feels poorly written, as there is a strong sense of folk narratives in terms of the plot, character formation, and detailed descriptions. Using the grammar of chŏn'gi fiction, Kim revolutionized the genre conventions and aesthetics of chŏn'gi fiction in Kŭmo sinhwa. The conventional grammar of chŏn'gi fiction perfected in Kŭmo sinhwa underwent a big change in the 17th century, when the length of narratives increased and plots began to reflect social issues. However, the conventions of chŏn'gi novels in terms of form and social issues did not continue into the 18th and 19th centuries, and chŏn'gi novels from this time were no longer central to Korean literature.

Kŭmo sinhwa is a representative chŏn'gi fiction, and the grammar of the genre that was perfected in this work continued to influence later Korean literature, including Sin Kwanghan’s short story collection Kijae kii (Strange Stories of Kijae) from the 16th century, as well as 17th-century chŏn'gi novels such as Chusaeng chŏn (Tale of Student Chu), Unyŏng chŏn (雲英傳 Story of Unyeong), and Choe Cheok jeon (崔陟傳 Tale of Choe Cheok). It also influenced the writing of novels such as The Cloud Dream of the Nine.

Kŭmo sinhwa was also introduced to Japan, and adaptations of the stories in Kŭmo sinhwa were published in Otogibōko (伽婢子), a short story collection written in 1666.

=== Background ===
It is important to look at both domestic and overseas influences concerning the creation of Kŭmo sinhwa. In terms of domestic influences, Kŭmo sinhwa was created under Korea’s past literary traditions. It was influenced by various folk narratives that were passed down for generations, including folk narratives about ghosts, ghosts and humans falling in love, and virtuous women, as well as chŏn'gi fiction from the late Silla and early Goryeo dynasties such as Ch'oe Ch'iwŏn, and kajŏn (假傳, personified allegorical biography) written in Chinese characters.

In terms of overseas influences, Kŭmo sinhwa was greatly influenced by China’s Jiandeng xinhua (剪燈新話 New Tales for the Trimming of the Lamps). Kim Sisŭp praised Jiandeng xinhua and even wrote a review of the work. Kŭmo sinhwa shows strong influences of Jiandeng xinhua in terms of topics and plot structure, but it is not a simple imitation. Kim had a deep understanding of the aesthetics and characteristics of chŏn'gi fiction, and his exceptional literary talent and creativity culminated in the writing of Kŭmo sinhwa.

=== Features ===
Kŭmo sinhwa has the following characteristics. First, while many classical Korean fiction are set in China, the stories in Kŭmo sinhwa are set in Korea, such as Gojoseon, Goryeo, and Joseon dynasties. The characters are also Korean, and the time periods are also realistic. Second, there are unrealistic and fantastic elements, such as ghosts, Taoist immortals, Yŏmna, the Dragon King, Yeombuju, and the Dragon Palace, in the stories, which embody the sufferings and anguish of the underprivileged and solitary main characters. Third, the main characters who get a taste of the supernatural world often become weary of life and eventually pass away, and as a result the stories tend to be tragic in nature. Fourth, the main characters in the story maintain their integrity and fidelity even in the face of misfortunes. Such emphasis on integrity and fidelity is related to the author Kim Sisŭp's experience when King Sejo usurped the throne. Fifth, many inserted poems and the poetic writing style provide detailed descriptions of the characters’ psyche and also emphasize the lyrical nature of the work.

== Other ==
Modern retellings of Kŭmo sinhwa include Choi In-hun’s short story "Kŭmo sinhwa" (금오신화 New Tales from Mount Geumo) (1963) and four volumes of Sim Sang-dae’s Sin Geumo sinhwa (신금오신화 New Geumo sinhwa) (1999-2004). It was also adapted into performances such as: Jeopo nori (저포놀이 A Game of Jeopo), a play written by Lee Ha-ryun and performed in 1981; Yisaeng gyujang-jeon: eojireolsa kkonnipun damneomeo pigo (이생규장전-어지럴사 꽃잎은 담넘어 피고 Tale of Yi Looking Over the Wall: A Whirl of Flowers Blossom Over the Wall), a changgeuk (traditional Korean musical drama) performed by the National Changgeuk Company of Korea in 1993; Yeongwonhan sarang: Yisaeng gyujang-jeon (영원한 사랑-이생규장전 Eternal Love: Tale of Yi Looking Over the Wall), a musical performance of jeongga (right song), performed at the National Gugak Center in 2011 and 2012. Manboksa chŏp'o ki was also adapted into a changgeuk by Hwang Ui-seong and performed in Namwon in 2002. In addition, Yi-saeng kyujang chŏnwas also adapted into an animation of the same title by director Kim In-woong in 2016.

== Texts ==
Kŭmo sinhwa appears in several historical records from the 15th century, which suggests that it was widely read in the Joseon Dynasty. However, it seems to have become a rare book after the mid-Joseon Dynasty, as it is difficult to find records of Kŭmo sinhwa let alone copies of the book. Only the texts of Yi-saeng kyujang chŏn and Manboksa chŏp'o ki can be found today, as two of the nine stories transcribed by Kim Jip (金集, 1574-1656) in Sindokjae sutaekbon chŏn'gijip (愼獨齋手澤本傳奇集 Collection of Fantasy Fiction Revised by Sindokjae).

Kŭmo sinhwa was also introduced to Japan during the Japanese invasions of Korea from 1592 to 1598. It was privately owned and enjoyed until 1653, when it was published as woodblock prints. This edition became the original script that was reprinted in Japan in 1653, 1660, and 1673, and Kŭmo sinhwa became widely read throughout Japan. In 1884, a newly edited version of Kŭmo sinhwa was published along with several reviews in Tokyo. Choe Nam-seon, who saw a copy of the book, introduced Kŭmo sinhwa back to Korea in 1927 by publishing photoprints of the book in the magazine Gyemyeong volume 19. Until the 1990s, this edition of Kŭmo sinhwa was mainly circulated in Korea.

In 1999, an edition published by Yun Chun-nyeon (尹春年, 1514-1567) while he served as the Deputy Director of the Printing Office from 1546 to 1567 was discovered in the Dalian Library in China. Afterward, this edition was established as the best-preserved copy.

== Sources ==
- "Kŭmo sinhwa", Encyclopedia of Korean Culture, https://terms.naver.com/entry.nhn?docId=551022&cid=46644&categoryId=46644
- "Yi-saeng kyujang chŏn", Encyclopedia of Korean Culture, https://terms.naver.com/entry.nhn?docId=542252&cid=46644&categoryId=46644
- "Manboksa chŏp'o ki", Encyclopedia of Korean Culture, https://terms.naver.com/entry.nhn?docId=545241&cid=46644&categoryId=46644
- "Ch'wiyu pubyŏkchŏng ki", Encyclopedia of Korean Culture, https://terms.naver.com/entry.nhn?docId=529991&cid=46644&categoryId=46644
- "Namyŏmbuju chi", Encyclopedia of Korean Culture, https://terms.naver.com/entry.nhn?docId=532952&cid=46644&categoryId=46644
- "Yonggung puyŏn nok", Encyclopedia of Korean Culture, https://terms.naver.com/entry.nhn?docId=569193&cid=46644&categoryId=46644
- The original Classical Chinese text in Wikisource
