= Hwamongjip =

17th c. Chinese-language Korean story collection

Hwamongjip (화몽집 A Collection of Romance and Dream Journey Stories) is a story collection written in Korean. It contains nine stories:

- "Jusaengjeon" (周生傳 "The Tale of Jusaeng")
- "Unyeongjeon" (雲英傳 "The Tale of Unyeong")
- "Yeongyeongjeon" (英英傳 "The Tale of Yeongyeong")
- "Dongseonjeon" (洞仙傳 "The Tale of Dongseon") or "Dongseongi" (동선기 "The Record of Dongseon")
- "Mongyudalcheonnok" (夢遊㺚川錄 "The Dream Journey of Dalcheon Pyeongya") or "Dalcheonmongyurok" (달천몽유록 "The Dream Journey of Dalcheon")
- "Wonsaengmongyurok" (元生夢遊錄 "The Dream Journey of Scholar Won")
- "Pisaengmyeongmongnok" (皮生冥夢錄 "The Dream Journey of Gentleman Pi")
- "Geumhwayeonghui" (金華靈會 "The Meeting of Spirits at Heumhwasa Temple") or "Geumsansamongyurok" ("The Dreaming Journey Around Geumsansa Temple")
- "Gangnojeon" (姜虜傳 "The Tale of Gang Hong-rip")

Only six lines from "Pisaengmyeongmongnok" have survived to the present day, and one page of "Geumhwayeonghu" is missing.

== Authorship ==
The phrase "yakgeogigae sicheongyeyuk" (略擧其槪 時天啓六), which means “The works were compiled in the sixth year of Cheongye" (which corresponds to the 4th year of King Injo’s reign, or 1626), indicates that Hwamongjip was transcribed during the first half of the 17th century. But a new argument states that the passage refers to part of a different book, Choecheokjeon (The Tale of Choe Cheok). The identity of Hwamongjip's author is unknown, but, considering the fact that many of the novels feature stories related to war, the compiler may have been a person who was conscious of the realities of Joseon in the aftermath of the Japanese invasions of Korea (1592–1598) and the Qing invasion of Joseon in 1636.

== Summary ==
“Jusaengjeon," “Unyeongjeon," “Yeongyeongjeon," and "Dongseonjeon" can be categorized as Romance novels, whereas "Mongyudalcheonnok," “Wonsaengmongyurok," “Pisaengmyeongmongnok," and "Geumhwayeonghui" are thought to be mongyurok, or records of a dream journey. The title, Hwamongjip, may refer to this division, with hwa (flower) meaning romance novel and mong (dream) meaning mongyurok. "Gangnojeon" is an anomaly as it is considered a historical novel; however, the work still features characteristics of a romance novel.

“Jusaengjeon" is about a tragic love triangle between a young scholar named Juhoe and two women named Bae-do and Seon-hwa. The first half of the book depicts the love of Jusaeng and Bae-do, and the second half, that of Jusaeng and Seon-hwa. Notably, Jusaeng is portrayed as a character who abandons loyalty and pursues worldly desires. Set in the Sujeonggung Residence of Grand Prince Anpyeong, "Unyeongjeon" concerns the tragic love of palace woman Unyeong and scholar and literary licentiate Kim Jinsha. "Yeongyeongjeon" depicts the love of Scholar Kim, who is attending Seonggyungwan, the most prestigious royal academic institute, and palace woman Yeongyeong. "Dongseonjeon" is about a romantic relationship involving Seo Mun-jeok, his wife Lady Yu, and entertainer Dongseon. "Dongseonjeon" is unique; its first half can be considered a romantic novel as it depicts the relationship between Seo Mun-jeok and Dong-seon, but the second half is a family novel dealing with the collaborative efforts of Lady Yu and Dong-seon to rescue Seo Mun-jeok.

“Mongyudalcheonnok" illustrates how a man meets, in his dream, the spirits of patriots who sacrificed themselves during the Japanese invasions of Korea (1592–1598). It also discusses the loyalty and achievements of numerous commanders, including Admiral Yi Sun-sin. In "Wonsaengmongyurok," a dreamer meets King Danjong and his loyal subjects, thereby dealing with the politico-historical incident of King Sejo's usurpation of the throne from King Danjong. "Pisaengmyeongmongnok" tackles the subject of the funeral and burial of war victims in the aftermath of the Japanese invasions of Korea (1592–1598). "Geumhwayeonghui" features the founders of each Chinese dynasty, reflecting a Han Chinese-centered historical perspective. Finally, "Gangnojeon" depicts Gang Hong-rip's surrender to Qing China in a critical tone, reflecting the pro-Ming and anti-Qing attitude prevalent during the period of the Ming-Qing transition.

== Features and significance ==
Hwamongjip demonstrates the circumstances that surrounded the Korean classical novels of the early and mid-17th century. The book is a selective compilation of stories written in similar time periods that can be clearly distinguished by genre. Its existence suggests that a significant number of stories were being produced at the time, enough to enable the publication of a collection. The stories appearing in Hwamongjip are longer than their predecessors, their plots more complex, and their characters more diverse, indicating that dynamic shifts were taking place in Korean classical literature at the time. Furthermore, Hwamongjip tackles issues facing post-war Korean society. It can be considered a collection of post-war stories in that the works appearing in the book deal with the traumas associated with the Japanese invasions of Korea (1592–1598) and the Qing Invasion of Joseon in 1636.

== Texts ==
Hwamongjip is a collection of Korean-script stories transcribed during the late Joseon period. The work is housed at Kim Il-sung University in North Korea, a fact known to South Korean scholars through North Korean academic writings on the history of Korean classical literature. Photographic, annotated, and translated editions of the book have been published in South Korea and are now easily available.
