= Silvery World =

1908 Korean novel by Lee Injik

Silvery World (Korean: 은세계) is a Korean novel published by Lee Injik in 1908, categorized as Sinsoseol, or new novel. The novel depicts how a wealthy farmer is killed by a venal official and denounces the corrupt feudal system of the late Joseon dynasty. The author wrote it with a plan to adapt it into a play from the beginning, and it was performed in Wongaksa as the first Korean sinyeongeuk, or new play.

== Plot ==
=== Summary ===
The novel is set in Gangwon-do and revolves around Choi Byeong-do, a wealthy farmer who desires to reform the country under the intellectual influence of progressive politician Kim Ok-gyun. However, the greedy local governor arrests Choi in an attempt to extort his fortune. Choi refuses to comply with the bribe and is subsequently tortured to death.

Following his death, Choi's children, Ok-sun and Ok-nam, are raised by his friend Kim Jeong-su. The siblings eventually leave Korea to pursue higher education in the United States. Despite facing severe financial hardships abroad, they manage to continue their studies with the assistance of an American missionary.

In 1907, after reading the news article entitled "Grand Reform in Korea", the siblings return home. They arrive during a period of intense civil unrest, marked by protests from militia members and soldiers demobilized by the Japan-Korea Treaty of 1907, leading to riots among militia men. While visiting a temple with their mother to pray to Buddha, the siblings encounter a group of militia fighters. Ok-nam urges the fighters to disband, arguing that national development must take priority over armed resistance. Ultimately, Ok-nam is captured by the militia.

=== Discrepancy between the first and last part ===
Many critics of Silvery World point out the discrepancy between the first part and the last part. Whereas the first part shows a strong disapproval of Korean society at the time, in the last part, such criticism fades away.

Based on this discrepancy, some claim that it is a reworked version of "Choi byeongdu taryeong (최병두 타령, Song of Choi Byeongdu)." Specifically, they say that its first part is a rework of the traditional song, at the time performed by entertainers and master singers, and only its last part about what happens after the death of Choi is written by the author.

=== Main themes ===
==== Denunciation of the late Joseon ====
The first part of Silvery World depicts the heroic life of the rich farmer Choi Byeongdo who lives in Gangwon-do. He has accumulated his wealth with a clear purpose to make Joseon a "civilized country." But he cannot realize his ideal due to the widespread corruption of the late Joseon. It was common for officials to exploit the people to get a public post and maintain their status in those days when the corrupt feudal system was spread throughout the country. The first part of the novel criticizes and denounces the society that betrays the heroic figure.

==== Justification of the Japanese colonization ====
That being said, in the last part, the critical voice drastically loses its power. The 'grand reform in Korea,' presented as the reason for the siblings to return to their home country, refers to the Japan-Korea Treaty of 1907, which enabled Japan to dethrone Emperor Gojong and take over the commandership of the Korean military. However, the fiction does not have any criticism of the imperialistic invasion of Japan, but rather glamorizes it as 'grand reform,' justifying the Japanese colonization of Korea.

The author, Lee Injik, founded a press and claimed the necessity of enlightenment before he gradually turned to rationalize the Japanese colonization. Around the time he published Silvery World, he was already fraternizing with pro-Japanese politicians, such as Lee Wan-yong and Jo Jung-eung. They asserted that the corruption in Joseon was one of the bad practices of the feudal system, and to solve this problem, Japan, a more developed country, had to rule Korea.

== Critical reception and literary value ==
The critic Lim Hwa acclaimed Silvery World for breaking out of the abstract prose of traditional fictions and realistically depicting the situations of the contemporary period. Traditional fictions written before the 20th century are mostly set in China and advocate Confucian values, the ruling idea of the feudal times. On the contrary, this novel assumes a critical attitude towards the reality of the country and seeks how to solve its problems. Through the frustration and hardship that the protagonist Choi Byeongdo experiences, it successfully embodies the structure of the Korean society at the time.

It has also been commended for its modern use of the Korean language. Its first part contains a number of folk songs enjoyed by the people in those days. The farmers who appear in the novel express their lives with their own language and songs. Silvery World has a literary value as it captures the contemporary period with the language of the people, even though the concept of modern national literature was yet to be formed when it was published.

== Adaptations ==
=== New play Silvery World ===
The author wrote it with a plan to adapt it into a play from the beginning. In fact, a record of its performance in Wongaksa has been found. The play ran from November 15, 1908, but the date of its last performance is not known. There is a controversy over whether the play was in a modern or traditional style, but the truth is unknown as the original script is lost.

=== "Choi byeongdu taryeong" and Silvery World ===
Another question with regard to Silvery World is the relationship between the work and "Choi byeongdu taryeong." Some argue that "Choi byeongdu taryeong"—it falls under the category of Pansori, a Korean genre of musical storytelling—was enjoyed throughout Gangwon-do and the author wrote the first part of the novel based on this song. To support this argument, evidence of other works adapted from the song has to be provided. However, other than Silvery World, there is no confirmed reworked version inspired by the song. In addition, even its original text is yet to be found. Therefore, it is difficult to verify this assumption.

Still, the novel cannot be said to have been created solely by the author's imagination, as the master Pansori singers who actively performed in those days mention the aforementioned song in their memoirs, though its original text is lost. Also, it is highly likely that, given the times, people sang songs about a venal official oppressing and killing a rich farmer. The fact that Silvery World includes long excerpts of folk songs supports the argument that the work of fiction is related to the Pansori songs of the day.

== Bibliography ==
=== Editions ===
- 《은세계》, 동문사, 1908 / Eunsegye (Silvery World), Dongmunsa, 1908
- 《은세계/모란봉/빈선랑의 일미인》, 서울대학교출판부, 2003 / Eunsegye, moranbong, binseonrang-ui ilmi-in (Silvery World, Moranbong Mountain, A Poor Man and His Japanese Wife), Seoul University Press, 2003
- 《은세계》, 토지, 2018. (e-book) / Eunsegye (Silvery World), Toji, 2018. E-book.

=== Translation ===
- Silvery World and Other Stories, Cornell University East Asia Program, 2018.
