= Literary Chinese literature in Korea =

Hanmunhak or Literary Chinese literature in Korea (Korean: 한문학; Hanja: 漢文學) is Korean literature written in Literary Chinese, which represents an early phase of Korean literature and influenced the literature written in the Korean language.

== Classical Chinese in Korea ==
The role of the Literary Chinese or Hanmun (Korean: 한문; Hanja: 漢文) in Korea was akin to the same role as Kanbun in Japan and in Vietnam, Hán văn; a role which is broadly comparable to that of the Latin language in Europe. During this period the use of written Chinese language did not indicate that Korean literati were fluent in spoken Chinese.

== Korean literature ==
The role of Literary Chinese was so dominant that the history of Korean literature and Chinese language are almost contiguous till the 20th Century.

Korean works in Chinese are typically rendered in English according to modern Korean hangul pronunciations:

- Samguk Sagi (Korean: 삼국사기; Hanja: 三國史記) "Three Kingdoms History"
- Samguk Yusa (Korean: 삼국유사; Hanja: 三國遺事) "Memorabilia of the Three Kingdoms"
- Geumo sinhwa (Korean: 규모신화; Hanja: 金鰲新話) "New stories from Mount Geumo"

It is disputed whether Chinese or Korean was the original language of some works:

- Dream of Nine Clouds (Korean: 구운몽; Hanja: 九雲夢).
