= Korean literature =

Literature produced by Koreans

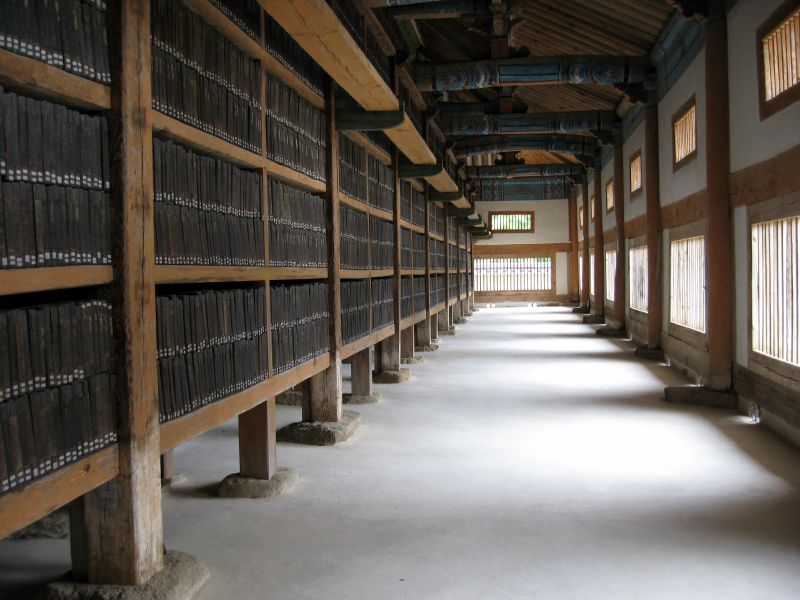
The Tripitaka Koreana

Korean literature is the body of literature produced by Koreans, mostly in the Korean language and sometimes in Classical Chinese. For much of Korea's 1,500 years of literary history, it was written in Hanja. It is commonly divided into classical and modern periods, although this distinction is sometimes unclear.

There are four major traditional poetic forms: hyangga ("native songs"); byeolgok ("special songs"), or changga ("long poems"); sijo ("current melodies"); and gasa ("verses"). Other poetic forms that flourished briefly include the kyonggi-style, in the 14th and 15th centuries, and the akchang ("words for songs") in the 15th century. The most representative akchang is Yongbi och'on ka (1445–47; Songs of Flying Dragons), a cycle compiled in praise of the founding of the Yi dynasty. Korean poetry originally was meant to be sung, and its forms and styles reflect its melodic origins. The basis of its prosody is a line of alternating groups of three or four syllables, which is probably the most natural rhythm to the language.

One famous earliest poetry or lyric song was the Gonghuin (Konghu-in) by Yeo-ok during Gojoseon.

== Hyangga ==
Hyangga (Korean: 향가; Hanja: 鄕歌) was written in Korean using modified hanja in a system that is called idu (이두; 吏讀; lit. 'clerk's writings'). Specifically, the variety of idu used to write hyangga was sometimes called "hyangchal". Idu was a system using hanja characters to express Korean. The key to the system was to use some hanja characters for their intended purpose, their meaning, and others for their pronunciation, ignoring their pictographic meaning. On the surface, it appears to be a complicated, even incomprehensible system, but after using the system one becomes comfortable with certain characters consistently standing for Korean words.

Hyangga was the first uniquely Korean form of poetry. It originally indicated songs that were sung in the Silla period. Only twenty five survive. The Samguk yusa contains 14 poems and the "Gyunyeojeon", a set of biographies of prominent monks, contains eleven poems. Both these classic works were written much after the Unified Silla, in the subsequent Goryeo dynasty, yet the poems in the Samguk yusa appear to be based on no-longer-extant records actually from the Silla period.

Hyangga are characterized by a number of formal rules. The poems may consist of four, eight or ten lines. The ten-line poems are the most developed, structured into three sections with four, four, and two lines respectively. Many of the ten-line poems were written by Buddhist monks, and Buddhist themes predominate the poems. Another dominant theme was "death". Many of the poems are eulogies to monks, to warriors, and to family members.

- Jemangmae-ga (Lament for My Sister; 제망매가; 祭亡妹歌) is a hyangga written by a Buddhist monk named Wolmyeong. Through this hyangga he mourns the death of his sister.
- Ode to Eternal Life (원왕생가; 願往生歌)

== Goryeo songs ==
The Goryeo period was marked by a growing use of hanja characters. Hyangga largely disappeared as a form of Korean literature, and "Goryeo gayo" (고려가요; lit. 'Goryeo songs') became more popular. Most of the Goryeo songs were transmitted orally and many survived into the Joseon period, when some of them were written down using hangul.

The poetic form of the Goryeo songs is known as byeolgok (별곡) or changga. It flourished during the middle and late Koryo dynasty. It is characterized by a refrain either in the middle or at the end of each stanza. The refrain establishes a mood or tone that carries the melody and spirit of the poem or links a poem composed of discrete parts with differing contents. The theme of most of these anonymous poems is love, the joys and torments of which are expressed in frank and powerful language. The poems were sung to musical accompaniments chiefly by women entertainers, known as kisaeng. There are two distinct forms: dallyeonche (단련체)and yeonjanche (연잔체). The former is a shorter form in which the entire poem was put into a single stanza, whereas the latter is a more extended form in which the poem is put into several stanzas. The Goryeo songs are characterized by their lack of clear form, and by their increased length. Most are direct in their nature, and cover aspects of common life.

== Sijo and Gasa ==
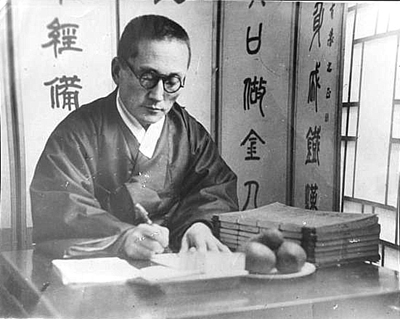
Representative Sijo writer Yi Gwangsu

Sijo and gasa are closely linked to the development of hangul in the early Joseon period. As hangul was created, akjang was developed as a way to note musical scores using the Korean script. King Sejong himself is credited with a compilation of Buddhist songs.

Sijo (literally current tune) was common in the Joseon period. Although its poetic form was established in the late Goryeo period, it did not become popular until the Joseon period. Many of the sijo reflected Confucian thought; the theme of loyalty is common. Sijo are characterized by a structure of three stanzas of four feet each. Each foot contains three to four syllables except on the third stanza, where the 1st foot is supposed to have 3 syllables and the 2nd foot can have as many as seven. Sijo are thought to have been popular with common people.

Gasa is a form of verse, although its content can include more than the expression of individual sentiment, such as moral admonitions. Gasa is a simple form of verse, with twinned feet of three or four syllables each. Some regard gasa a form of essay. Common themes in gasa were nature, the virtues of gentlemen, or love between man and woman.

== Prose ==
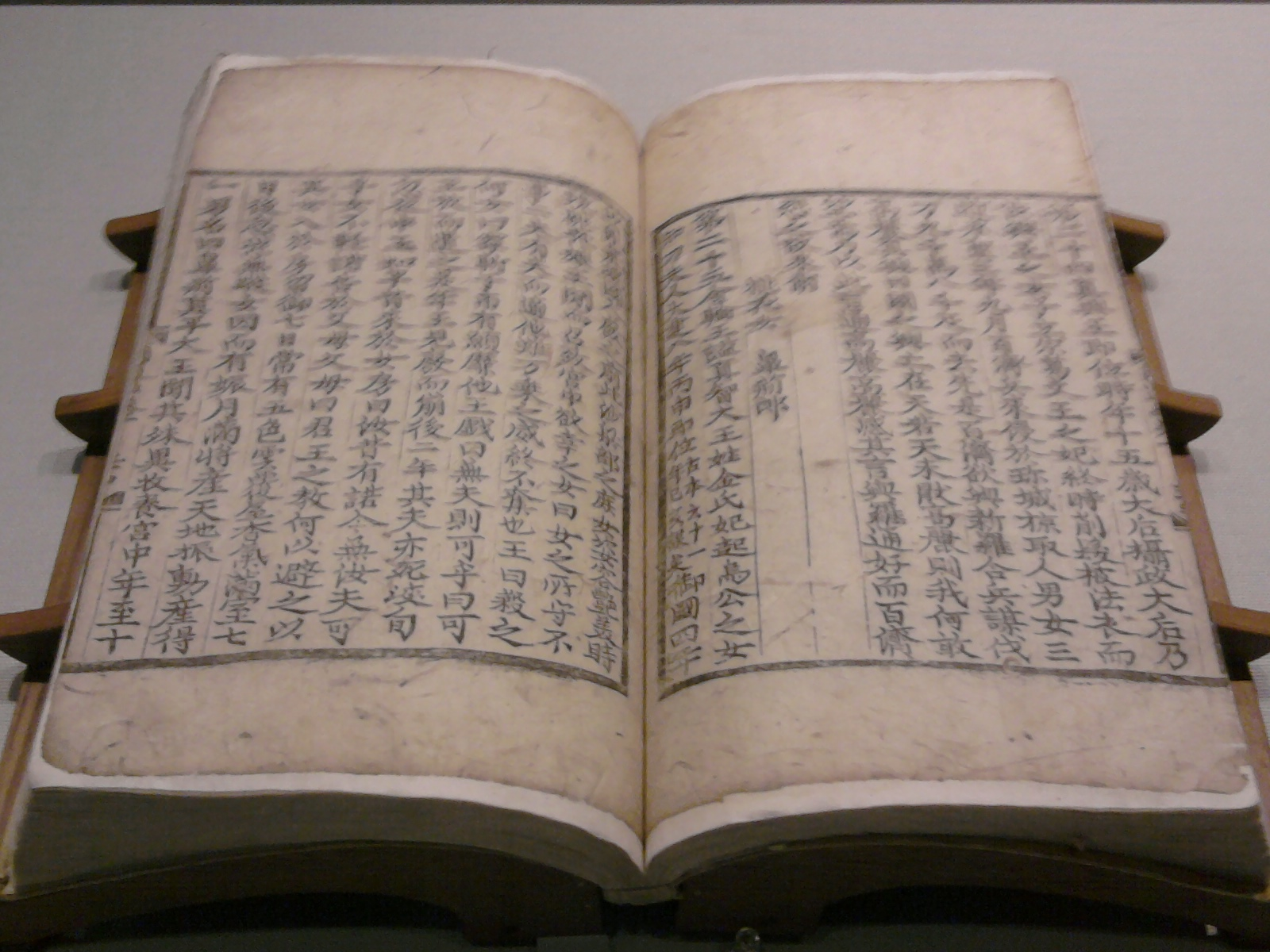
Samguk yusa

Korean prose literature can be divided into narratives, fiction, and literary miscellany. Narratives include myths, legends, and folktales found in the written records. The principal sources of these narratives are the two great historical records compiled in Classical Chinese during the Koryo era: Samguk sagi (1146; "Historical Record of the Three Kingdoms") and Samguk yusa (1285; "Memorabilia of the Three Kingdoms"). The most important myths are those concerning the Sun and the Moon, the founding of Korea by Tangun, and the lives of the ancient kings. The legends touch on place and personal names and natural phenomena. The folktales include stories about animals; ogres, goblins, and other supernatural beings; kindness rewarded and evil punished; and cleverness and stupidity. Because the compiler of the Samguk yusa was a Zen master, his collection includes the lives of Buddhist saints; the origin of monasteries, stupas, and bells; accounts of miracles performed by Buddhas and bodhisattvas; and other tales rich in shamanist and Buddhist elements. It also includes the 14 hyangga mentioned above. The compilations made in the Koryo period preserved the stories of prehistoric times, of the Three Kingdoms, and of the Silla dynasty and have remained the basic sources for such material. Later compilations made during the Yi dynasty served as a major source of materials for later Yi dynasty fiction.

=== Fiction ===
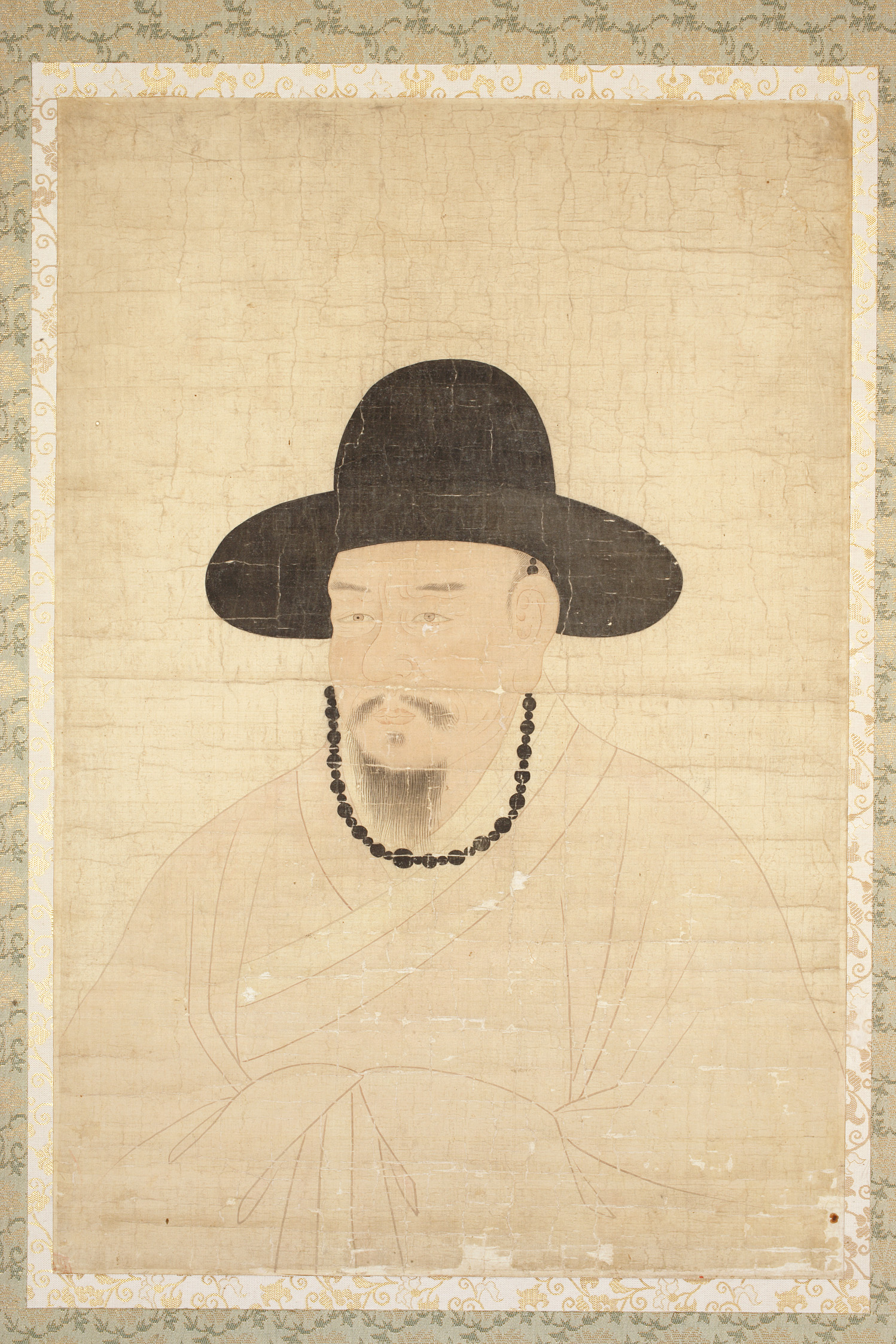
Kim Sisŭp, author of Kŭmo sinhwa

Korean fiction can be classified in various ways. First, there is Korean fiction written in Chinese and that written in Korean. Second, there are the short works of one chapter, "medium" works of about 10 chapters, and long works of more than 10 chapters. Third, there are works of yangban writers and those of common writers. In respect to the last classification, however, there is also a group of fictional works in which the viewpoints of the yangban and the commoner are combined. Most of this fiction was based on the narratives mentioned above, the author adding incidents and characters to the original story. It is not possible to assign definite dates or authors to most of these works. The stories are generally didactic, emphasizing correct moral conduct, and almost always have happy endings. Another general characteristic is that the narratives written by yangban authors are set in China, whereas those written by commoners are set in Korea.

The literary miscellany consists of random jottings by the yangban on four broad topics: history, biography, autobiography, and poetic criticism. Like fiction, these jottings were considered to be outside of the realm of officially sanctioned Chinese prose (e.g., memorials, eulogies, and records), but they provided the yangban with an outlet for personal expression. Thus, their portrayal of the customs, manners, and spirit of the times in which they were composed make these writings an essential part of Korean prose.

The first known classical work of Korean fiction is Kŭmo sinhwa (金鰲新話 금오신화 New stories from Mount Kŭmo) by Kim Sisŭp. It was written in Chinese. From the 17th century onwards, fiction became increasingly popular and more readily available through book rental schemes.

Pansori-based fiction was a particularly popular form of fiction, appearing in the late 17th and early 18th century, based on the five orally transmitted pansori (Chunhyangga, Simcheongga, Heungbuga, Jeokbyeokga and Sugungga). Although based on older traditional songs, it was composed in its present form in the 1870s by Shin Jae-hyo, a pansori writer, and was characterized by human stereotypes of ordinary people of the time.

In the mid-Joseon period, parable-like stories were published. By the end of the Joseon period, many writers had started to deviate from the orthodox conventions of classical Chinese literature, and literature about common people such as merchants, thieves, or gisaeng was commonplace.

- Kim Manjung (1637–1692) wrote The Cloud Dream of the Nine (구운몽).
- Tale of Hong Gildong (홍길동전)
- Chunhyangjeon is a kodae sosol (고대 소설) novel based on the pansori Chunhyangga.
- Several lives of the poet Ch'oe Ch'iwŏn have come down: In hanmun the Choegounjeon (최고운전) Choemunhonjeon (최문헌전), in hangul the Choechungjeon (최충전; 崔忠傳), The Story of Faithful Ch'oe.

=== Oral literature ===
Oral literature includes all texts that were orally transmitted from generation to generation until the invention of Hangul (han'gul)--ballads, legends, mask plays, puppet-show texts, and p'ansori ("story singing") texts.

Some song lyrics (e.g., Hyangga), which originated in oral tradition, were recorded using the hyangchal system, reflecting the highly developed literary activity from early in Korean history. These orally transmitted texts are categorized as ballads and are classified according to singer (male or female), subject matter (prayer, labour, leisure), and regional singing style (capital area, western, and southern). The songs of many living performers, some of whom have been designated as "intangible national treasures" by the South Korean government, are still being recorded.

Legends include all those folk stories handed down orally and not recorded in any of the written records. These legends were for long the principal form of literary entertainment enjoyed by the common people. They deal with personified animals, elaborate tricks, the participation of the gods in human affairs, and the origin of the universe. An example of a folktale orally passed is the Gyeonmyo jaengju which is about a journey a cat and a dog take to retrieve a lost marble out of gratitude toward their master.

The mask plays are found in Hahoe, Chinju, T'ongyong, Kimhae, and Tongnae in North and South Kyongsang provinces; Yangju in Kyonggi Province; Pongsan in Hwanghae Province; and Pukch'ong in south Hamgyong Province. The most representative plays are the sandae kuk genre of Yangju, the pyolsin kut of Hahoe, and the okwangdae nori (five-actor play) of Chinju. Although the origin of these plays is uncertain, they are generally presumed to have developed from primitive communal ceremonies. Gradually, the ceremonial aspect of the plays disappeared, and their dramatic and comic possibilities were exploited. The dialogue was somewhat flexible, the actors being free to improvise and satirize as the occasion demanded. The plays were not performed on a stage, and there were no precise limits as to the space or time in which the performances took place. The audience also traditionally responded vocally to the play as well as passively watching it. The organization of the mask plays—through repetition and variety—achieves a remarkable effect of dramatic unity. (see also dramatic literature)

Only two puppet-show texts are extant, Kkoktukaksi nori (also called Pak Ch'omjikuk; "Old Pak's Play") and Mansok chung nori. Both titles are derived from names of characters in the plays. No theory has been formulated as to the origin and development of these plays. The plots of the puppet plays, like those of the mask plays, are full of satiric social criticism. The characters—Pak Ch'omji, governor of P'yongam, Kkoktukaksi, Buddhist monk, and Hong Tongji—dance and sing, enacting familiar tales that expose the malfeasance of the ruling classes. (see also puppetry)

The final type of folk literature is found in the texts of p'ansori of the Yi dynasty. These texts were first recorded in the 19th century as verse, but the written forms were later expanded into p'ansori fiction, widely read among the common people. This transformation from poetry to narrative fiction was easily accomplished, since p'ansori were always narrative. Originally the entire p'ansori performance repertoire consisted of 12 madang ("titles"). Although all 12 remain as narrative fiction, only five of them are sung today. The texts evolved gradually from the legends, which provided their sources and were altered and expanded as they were passed from one performer to another.

== History ==
=== The early Joseon period ===
Yongbi eocheonga (용비어천가; 龍飛御天歌; lit. 'Songs of the Dragons Flying to Heaven'). It was compiled during the reign of Sejong the Great as an official recognition of the Joseon dynasty and its ancestral heritage as the forerunners of Joseon, the Golden Age of Korea. The Songs were composed through the efforts of a committee of Confucian philologists and literati in the form of 125 cantos.

This compilation was the first piece of Korean text to depart from a long history reliant on Chinese characters and be recorded in Hangul, the first and official alphabet of Korea. There are several underlying themes in addition to the establishment of the Joseon dynasty which are of significant importance to understanding the events that provoked the creation of these poems: linear events that took place in China, the apotheosis of virtuous kings proceeding the fall of the Goryeo dynasty, and Confucian political and philosophical ideologies of the era in rejection to Buddhism. Each of the poems included in the work convey deep-seated feelings of nationalism and a proud proclamation of cultural independence from the Mongol Empire.

=== The late Joseon period ===
Modern Korean literature developed against the background of the Joseon dynasty's fall. This first period of modern Korean literature is often called the "enlightenment". This period was to a large extent influenced by the 1894 Gabo Reforms which introduced Western-style schools and newspapers emerged. Many newspapers published sijo, gasa, or even serial novels and led to the emergence of professional writers. Sinchesi (신체시; lit. 'new poetry') was established, and contributed to the formation of modern free verse poetry which is called Jayusi (자유시). Sinchesi abandoned the fixed metaphor found in classical Korean poetry, influenced by the French vers libre.

Many biographical works were published in the late Joseon period where the main character was often depicted as a hero. These works cultivated patriotism and national consciousness.

== Modern literature ==
Modern Korean literature gradually developed under the influence of Western cultural contacts based on trade and economic development. The earliest modern Korean translation of a work of fiction was John Bunyan's Pilgrim's Progress (천로역정; Cheonno-yeokjeong), translated by James Scarth Gale and his wife Gibson (1895).

Christian religion found its way into Korea, culminating in the first complete edition of the Bible in Korean published in 1910. However, it was mostly Western aesthetic schools that influenced Korean literature. Music and classical poetry, formerly considered one as part of changgok, were increasingly perceived as old-fashioned and out of date.

Modern literature is often linked with the development of hangul, which helped increase working class literacy rates. Hangul reached its peak of popularity in the second half of the 19th century, resulting in a major renaissance. Sinsoseol, for instance, are novels written in hangul.

=== Korean Literature during Japanese rule ===
During the period of Japanese imperial rule (1910–1945), Japanese literature had deep connections with the establishment of modern literature in Korea due to some of the founders of modern literature in Korea having come from Korean students who had studied in Japan during the Meiji period. Their representatives are Choi Nam-seon and Yi Gwangsu. Many expressions of the late Joseon period, with their focus on self-reliance and independence, were no longer possible. Ernest Bethell's Taehan Maeil Shinbo (大韓每日申報) provided for Korean writers a brief opportunity of artistic expression free from censorship, from July 1904 till May 1909, but after control of the paper was seized by the Government-General uncensored Korean publishing became impossible.

Lee In-jik's New Novel: Bloody Tears (혈의 누; Hyeorui-nu), which was published in 1906 in Mansebo, later became a universal name for "New Novel". "New novel" refers to the works created for about 10 years before 1917. "New Novel" generally involved realistic problems as sanctions. Accordingly, it dealt with topics related to self-reliance, freedom of association, the promotion of new education, enlightenment, and the destruction of tradition and superstition, and the act of salvation of enlightenment.

With the Samil Movement in 1919 came a new form of Korean literature. Many writers exhibited a more positive attitude, trying to cope with the national situation at the time. Literature focused on self-discovery, and increasingly on concrete reality. Artistic endeavors were supported by new nationalist newspapers.

In 1919, Kim Tong-in and Kim Hyok founded a literary magazine, Changjo (창조 Creation) marking the starting point of contemporary Korean literature.This magazine and the magazines that followed after during the 1920s and 1930s were called Donginji (동인지 (同人志)), and it was a literary tradition influenced by the Doujin tradition in Japan, which reflected the initial founders' background as korean students in Tokyo. The magazine Changjo was followed in 1920 by GaeByeok (개벽), and Pyeho (폐허 廢墟 The Ruins, Hwang Song-u and Yom Sang-sop); in 1921 Changmichon (장미촌); in 1922 Baekcho (백조 White Tide, Yi Sang-hwa and Hyon Chin-gon); and in 1923 Geumsong (금성 Gold Star, of Yi Chang-hui and Yang Chu-dong). The literary magazines which appeared during the 1920s and 1930s laid the basis for the future development of modern Korean literature. Almost all of these magazines were ordered to discontinue publication in the 1940s as the Japanese tightened their grip with the spread of their aggressive war to the Pacific and all of Southeast Asia. The important task of the 1920s was to work out ways of introducing foreign elements into literary works dealing with the reality of colonial rule in Korea.

Many novels of the 1920s centered on themes of the suffering of intellectuals. The lives of farmers were often depicted as pathetic. As the Japanese government strengthened ideological coercion during the 1930s, Korean literature was directly affected. Many novels of the time experimented with new literary styles and techniques.

- Kang Kyeong-ae (강경애, 姜敬愛; 1907–1944): In'gan munje (인간문제 From Wonso Pond)
- Kim Tong-in (1900–1951): Pulgun San (붉은 산 Red Mountain)
- Shim Hun (1901–1936): Sangnoksu (상록수 Evergreen Tree, 1943 posthumously)
- Ri Ki-yong (리기영, 李箕永; 1895–1984): Kohyang (The Home Village, 1932), later a North Korean author
- Hong Myong-hui (1880–1968): Im Kkok-chong (Story of the bandit Im Kkok-chong)
- Choi Seo-hae (최서해, 崔曙海; 1901–1932): Hongyom (홍염)
- Yom Sang-seop (염상섭, 廉想涉; 1897–1963): Sam dae (Three Generations, 1932) Mansejon (만세전)
- Chae Man-shik (1902–1950): Thaepyong Chunha (태평천하 Peaceful Spring on Earth, 1937) and Tagryu (Muddy Stream, 1941)

Poets included: Han Yong-un, Buddhist reformer and poet: Nimui chimmuk (The Silence of My Beloved, 1925), Chang Man-yong, Chu Yo-han, Hwang Sok-woo (황석우), Kim Myeong-sun, Kim Sowol, Kim Yeong-nang, Pak Tu-jin, Yi Sang, Yi Sang-hwa (이상화; 李相和), Yu Chi-hwan, Yun Dong-ju, and Yi Yuk-sa (이육사, 李陸史; 1904–1944) tortured to death by the Japanese military police.

=== National division ===
After 1945, Korea soon found itself divided into North and South. The Korean War led to the development of literature centered on the wounds and chaos of war and tragedy.

North Korea (DPRK)

South Korea (ROK)

Much of the post-war literature in South Korea deals with the daily lives of ordinary people, and their struggles with national pain. The collapse of the traditional Korean value system is another common theme of the time. In the post-war period, a traditionalist movement emerged: going back to the roots of traditional rhythms and folk sentiments. Other poets are linked to an experimentalist movement, attempting to bring new experiences to Korean poetry.

In the 1960s many South Korean writers started to reject post-war literature as sentimental escapism. While some South Korean authors reflected traditional humanism, writings by many others reflect deep alienation and despair. They sought to engage the readers with the political reality of the time. This led poetry and literature in general to become an important means of political expression. Also remarkable for the development of literature in 1960s was the influence of Western modernism. The 1970s saw the emergence of literature that was anti-establishment and dealt with the concerns of rapid industrialization, such as the neglect of farmers.

At the same time, literature concerned with the national division (bundan soseol) became more popular. At the beginning of the twenty-first century, the national division is still a common theme, but classic stories are also popular. Some North Korean writers are very highly appreciated in the South and in 2005 writers from both Koreas held a joint literary congress.

== Korean literature abroad ==
In the Soviet Union, ethnic Korean Koryo-saram and left-leaning Koreans published and read literature through the Leninist Banner (now Koryo Ilbo), including poet Cho Ki-chon, who eventually moved to North Korea.

Until the 1980s Korean literature was largely ignored by non-Korean speakers. The diversity of the books translated and quality of translations have both improved. Flowers of Fire (1974) was one of the first anthologies of Korean literature published in English. In non-English-speaking countries there are fewer Korean works translated, though LTI Korea has also promoted translations in German, Spanish, French and Polish. The increased popularity of Korean film has increased interest in Korean mass market literature, particularly in Japan and China.

== See also ==
- Korean poetry
- Culture of Korea
- List of Korean-language poets
- List of Korean novelists
- Literature Translation Institute of Korea

== Bibliography ==
- Choe-Wall, Yang Hi (2003). Vision of a Phoenix: The Poems of Hŏ Nansŏrhŏn, Ithaca, New York, Cornell University. ISBN 1-885445-42-3 hc.
- Hyun, Theresa (2003). Writing Women in Korea: Translation and Feminism in the Early Twentieth Century. Honolulu: University of Hawaiʻi Press. ISBN 978-0-8248-2677-2
- Lee, Peter H. (2013). The Story of Traditional Korean Literature. Amherst, New York: Cambria Press. ISBN 978-1-60497-853-7
- Lee, Peter H. (1990). Modern Korean Literature: An Anthology. Honolulu: University of Hawaiʻi Press. ISBN 978-0-8248-1321-5
- Lee, Peter H. (1981). Anthology of Korean Literature: From Early Times to the Nineteenth Century. Honolulu: University of Hawaiʻi Press. ISBN 978-0-8248-0756-6
- Lee, Peter H. (2003). A History of Korean Literature, Cambridge University Press
- McCann, David R. (2000). Early Korean Literature: Selections and Introductions. New York: Columbia University Press. ISBN 978-0-231-11947-4
- Park, Si Nae (2020). The Korean Vernacular Story: Telling Tales of Contemporary Chosŏn in Sinographic Writing. Columbia University Press. ISBN 978-0231195423
- Pihl, Marshall R (1994). The Korean Singer of Tales. Cambridge, Mass.: Harvard University Press. ISBN 978-0-674-50564-3
