= Gasa (poetry) =

Medieval Korean poetry style

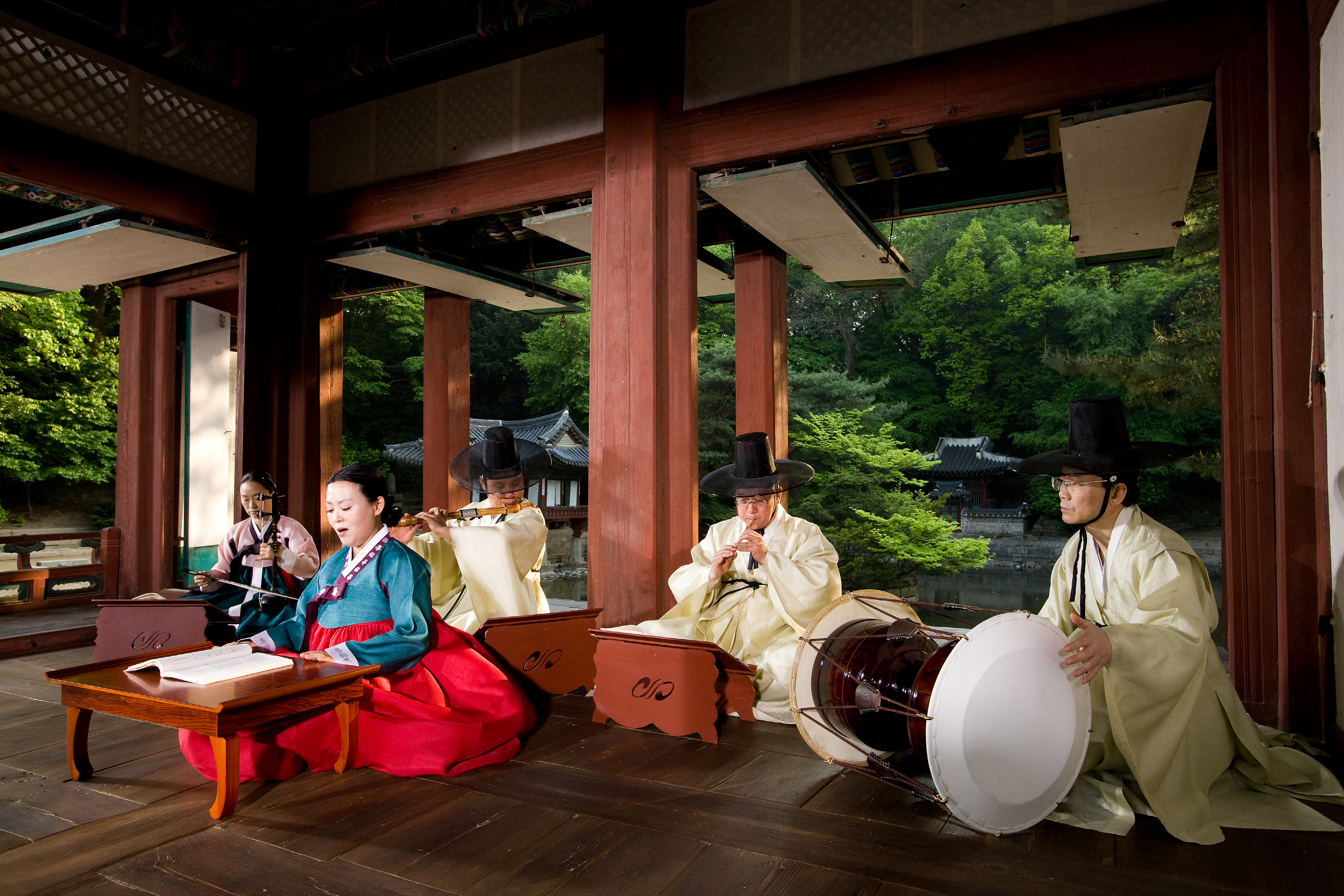
- A modern gasa performance (2008)

Korean name
- Hangul: 가사
- Hanja: 歌詞; 歌辭
- RR: gasa
- MR: kasa

Gasa (Korean: 가사; Hanja: 歌詞; 歌辭) or kasa was a form of poetry popular during the Joseon period in Korea. Gasas were commonly sung, and were popular among yangban women. Chŏng Ch'ŏl, a poet of the 16th century, is regarded as having perfected the form, which consisted of parallel lines, each broken into two four-syllable units. The form had first emerged during the Goryeo period. Gasa was a vocal genre that derived from Jeongga (정가), which consisted of three types of genre. Gagok and sijo were basically poems set to melodies, while gasa were a bit longer than sijo poems. Gasa emerged during Goryeo but became very prominent during the Joseon period. Based on relevant records, it is presumed that this form of verse started to be written after the reign of King Yeongjo (r. 1724–1776). At the very beginning, gasa was meant to be sung (as it means words to sing/words to be sung). Over time, they became longer and began to be recited instead. Some even consider them to be essays. A gasa can go on, as long as its composer stops writing. The narratives were typically long, and very rarely styled – so it is unclear as to how they were sung due to the different melodies and sounds.

The common themes in gasa were nature, and the love between man and woman. The history of the gasa is divided into two periods, one of the divisions being marked by the Japanese invasion of 1592–97. During the earlier period, gasa were generally about 100 lines long and dealt with such subjects as female beauty, war, and seclusion. A vast majority of gasa writers were usually Yangban. During the later period, gasas became longer and dealt with moral instruction, travel accounts, banishment, and the writer’s personal misfortunes. Unlike the earlier period, the later writers were usually commoners.

Gasa lyrics tend to be longer and include many Chinese characters, making it difficult to appreciate in modern times. Because of this, young Gugak musicians are trying to modernize gasa songs to suit listeners today. The Kasa (gasa) developed at about the same time as the sijo. In its developing stage, gasa borrowed the form of the Chinese tz’u (lyric poetry) or fu (rhymed prose). Either line of a couplet is divided into two groups, the first having three or four syllables and the second having four syllables. Some historians tend to exclude Korean literatures that include Chinese characters, as they believe that they are simply a form of Chinese literature, and not so much Korean literature.

Only twelve gasa pieces survive to this day. Some well-known gasa songs include “Suyangsanga 수양산가”, “Cheosaga 처사가,” and “Baekgusa 백구사.” A few of them are about love, like “Hwanggyesa 황계사,” which is about a woman’s longing for her loved one, along with “Maehwaga 매화가” or “Song of Plum Blossoms,” which is about the admiration of the plum blossoms that flower and blossom in the spring snow.

The predecessors of today’s K-pop idols were the Gagaek, or singers, of the late Joseon period. Gagaek are singers that were skillful in vocal music such as gasa, Sijo, and Gagok – their status was mainly middle-class. They were more notable during the Joseon period. This has evolved slowly and is seen in modern Korea, in a slightly different form. With the rise of kpop, we are starting to see this new profession come to light – and it is much different compared to singers in Western countries. Through rigorous training, many young South Koreans sacrifice so much in order to achieve their dreams and passions as singers. Gagaek singers were skillful in different vocal musics and style, just how K-pop idols today are trained to sing in different tones and styles – alongside singing, rapping, and dancing, all simultaneously.

In modern Korean, the word is also synonymous with "lyrics of a song" in the context of modern music, an etymology that is shared with Japanese and Chinese.

== See also ==
- Korean poetry
- Korean literature
- History of Korea
