= Korean heroic novels =

In classic Korean literature, a heroic novel (Korean: 영웅소설; RR: yeongung soseol) is a novel that tells the life story of a hero who is born of noble blood under unusual circumstances, is abandoned or leaves home and struggles in suffering circumstances, and eventually becomes a winner.

== Plot ==
Jo Dong-il argues that classic Korean novels stemmed from four different types of folktales: life and spirit (myeonghon) tales (about a man falling in love with a dead woman), dream (mongyu) tales (about what happened in a dream), unrecorded (ilsa) tales (about an extremely talented person who does not accomplish anything notable and ends up disappearing without a trace), and heroic (yeongung) tales (about the life of a hero). The four different types of Korean novels came to be: life and spirit (myeonghon) novels, dream (mongyu) novels, unrecorded (ilsa) novels, and heroic novels. Among them, heroic novels refer to works that are structured to tell life stories of heroes. A typical life story of a hero is developed in the following form: the hero 1) is of noble blood, 2) conceived or born under unnatural circumstances, 3) has great skills unlike other ordinary people, 4) is abandoned and nearly killed, 5) meets people who can raise him and thus avoids getting killed, 6) grows up and faces a crisis, and 7) struggles through the crisis to ultimately become the winner.

Jo believes that Korean heroic novels share the same structure as ancient myths about the lives of the founders of state, such as the Myth of Jumong. Stories that were passed down to younger generations became novels, starting with the Hong Gildong-jeon (洪吉童傳 The Story of Hong Gildong), which became the first Korean classic novel with a heroic narrative. Various heroic novels were written in the late Joseon dynasty, and they came to be at the heart of the history of Korean novels, according to Jo. Of the four different types of the early Korean novels, Jo argues that heroic novels—the life stories of heroes, which have long been passed down from the ancient myths—came to be central to Korean literature.

He asserts that the mythological ability of the self gradually came to an end, as we went from the myths of the founding of the state to Hong Gildong-jeon and later heroic novels. In other words, as myths became novels, the genre of heroic novels became more developed, replacing the “mythological characteristic of the self” with the idea of using ordinary people in our daily lives as the main character.

Jo classifies heroic novels into three groups depending on the degree of “mythical abilities” of the heroes. He estimated the first group to have been written in the mid-to the late-17th century, consisting of Geumbangul-jeon (金鈴傳 Tale of the Golden Bell), Yang Pung-jeon (楊豊雲傳 Tale of Yang Pung), Sukhyang-jeon (淑香傳 Tale of Sukhyang), Sodaeseong-jeon (蘇大成傳 Tale of Sodaeseong), and Kuunmong (九雲夢 Dream of the Nine Clouds). The second group consists of Jo Ung-jeon (趙雄傳 Tale of Jo Ung), Yu Chungryeol-jeon (劉忠烈傳 Tale of Yu Chungryeol), Hyeon Sumun-jeon (玄壽文傳 Tale of Hyeon Sumun), Hwang Un-jeon (黃雲傳 Tale of Hwang Un), and Yi Daebong-jeon (李大鳳傳 Tale of Yi Daebong), which were estimated to have been written between the late 17th century to the early 18th century. The last group, in which the “mythological ability” of heroes have nearly vanished, were estimated to have been written in mid-18th century or later and consists of Jang Pungun-jeon (張風雲傳 Tale of Jang Pungun), and Jang Gyeong-jeon (張敬傳 Tale of Jang Gyeong). In terms of time periods, Hong Gildong-jeon marks the very beginning of the heroic novels, and the time of creation of later heroic novels were estimated depending on the degree of the heroes’ “mythological abilities.”

== Features and Significance ==
Heroic novels account for a considerable portion of classic Korean novels, and the theory of heroic novels had a huge influence on the study of Korean literature as an important theory that supports the basic composition of the history of classic Korean novels. For instance, many scholars viewed Hong Gildong-jeon as an imitation of the Chinese novel Suho-jeon (水滸傳 Outlaws of the Marsh) in the past, but now it is generally considered the first Korean heroic novel. This is an interpretation that sees Hong Gildong-jeon as a link between the Korean founding myths and the heroic novels of the late Joseon dynasty.

Later scholars slightly changed the basic type of heroic novels or created subtypes that belong under the umbrella of the basic type to systematically categorize the numerous classic Korean novels. The concept of heroic novels is also closely linked to the heroic novels that feature female protagonists.

At first, heroic novels included a broad range of works including Kuunmong and Sukhyang-jeon, but the scope of the genre has narrowed gradually to focus on “heroes” that represent a group of people. Currently, there is a considerable overlap between war story (gundam) novels, such as Sodaeseong-jeon, Jo Ung-jeon, Yu Chungryeol-jeon, and heroic novels, and there have been active discussions on defining the concepts of heroic novels and of war story novels.
