= Chu Yo-han =

South Korean politician (1900–1979)

- Hangul: 주요한
- Hanja: 朱耀翰
- RR: Ju Yohan
- MR: Chu Yohan

Art name
- Hangul: 송아
- Hanja: 頌兒
- RR: Songa
- MR: Songa
- Japanese name: Matsumura Kōichi (松村紘一)

Chu Yo-han (Korean: 주요한; 5 December 1900 – 17 November 1979) was a twentieth-century Korean poet, journalist, businessman and politician. He came from the Shinan Chu clan (신안 주씨; 新安朱氏).

== Biography ==
=== Early life ===
Chu Yo-han was born in Pyongyang, under what was then the Joseon period. He attended elementary school in Pyongyang, and then middle school at the Meiji Academy and Dai-ichi High School in Japan. At that time, his father, Chu Gong-sam, was dispatched to Tokyo as a missionary toward Korean students studying in Japan. Taking this opportunity, he learned European poets and their poetry, and wrote many poems actively in a group with other Korean poets.

He was the editor of The Creation (창조; 創造), the first literary magazine in Korea and was one of the leading figures of the New Poetry movement. When the independence movement staged by Chu and other Korean students in Tokyo failed in 1919, he fled in exile to Shanghai in May 1919.

In association with Yi Gwangsu, he worked as a reporter for the provisional government newspaper The Independence (Dongnip Sinmun, 독립신문), He admired and followed Ahn Changho, the leader of the Korean government in exile. In Shanghai, he entered Hujiang University (호강대학; 沪江大学) to study Chemistry. He graduated from Huijang University in 1925.

=== Career ===
When he returned to Korea after graduation in 1925, he joined Dong-A Ilbo, nationalist newspaper, as a reporter. He was promoted to the editorial writer and then editor-in-chief. Later, he moved to a rival newspaper, Chosun Ilbo. He had a continuous relationship with Ahn Changho as a member of the Young Korean Academy ever since.

Towards the end of the Japanese occupation of Korea, he was tortured until he cooperated with the Japanese colonial government in enforcing its conscription and dispatching Korean soldiers to the Pacific battle fields. The Japanese colonial government forced him to change his name into Matsumura Kōichi (Hanja: 松村紘一). He has been criticized for writing propagandist pro-Japan poetry, and making speeches encouraging Korean young men to participate in the war.

After Korea was liberated from the Japanese rule in 1945, Chu worked hard as a businessman to establish and run Youngpoong Company with other partners. In the late 1950, he succeeded to turn into a politician when he was elected two times in a row to the National Assembly in downtown Seoul. Right after the April Revolution in 1960, he was appointed as the Minister of Commerce and Industry. After the May 16 coup in 1961, he retired from politics and became a businessman again to run a newspaper company (Daehan Ilbo, Hanja: 大韓日報) and a shipping company.

== Literary works ==
Chu was considered a representative poet of the 1920 and 30's and his work can be roughly divided into those poems composed before his exile in Shanghai and those written afterward. His earlier poems, written during his years in Japan, reflect the influence of modern Western and Japanese poetry. The influence of the French symbolist poet Paul Fort is especially evident in pieces such as "Fireworks" (Bullori): in a limpid, clear style he sensitively registers the minutest of impressions and manages to lend them a sensual immediacy.

You may sense such delicate impressions from two verses of the poem Bullori, which opened the age of modern poetry in Korea.

Ah, it's getting dark. The sky in the west is glowing with pink lights disappearing on the lonely river. Ah, in the evening after sunset, the night will come again when I'm crying in the shade of an apricot tree. Today, it's the eighth of April [Buddha's Birthday] when the joyful voices of people flow in and out in the streets. Why should I endure my tears in my heart alone?

Ah, it's dancing and swaying. A bright red fire ball is dancing. When I looked down at the top of a quiet castle gate, I could smell waters and sands below. As torches which were biting the night and the sky later bit off themselves as if something was running short, a young man with a depressed heart threw away his promising dreams in the past into the cold river. How could the cold-hearted river stop such shadow of dreams? - - - Ah, there is no flower which wouldn't wither when it is cut off. Even though I stay alive, my mind is dying when I think of the deceased lover. What the heck! I'd rather burn my heart with that fire and to cast away my sorrow. When I visited the tomb with painful footsteps, flowers, which withered during the winter, were in bloom. I wish the spring filled with love come again. I'd rather die in that water, then someone would feel sorry for myself. . . . At that time, tung, tak a paper fire cracker is fired flying sparks. When I am awakened, uproarious onlookers seem to laugh at or scold me. Ah, I'd like to live with stronger passion. I see the smoke of torches getting tangled. In the agony inside the breathless fire, I think unexpectedly with a pounding heart, I want to live a more passionate life.

Chu Yo-han's work as a whole more or less reflects a gradual turning away from styles and forms influenced by Western poetry toward traditional Korean poetry. Like Kim Eok, he was a major figure in Korean Literature who pioneered the move away from Western imitation to his literary roots. He articulates the reasons for this shift of inspiration in his critical piece, "To the One Who Would Write a Song" (Noraereul jieusillyeoneun iege), in which he places the highest value on the creation of beauty and vitality in the Korean language and move on to develop a complete theory of poetry. After 1930, Yohan concentrated on writing Sijo (Hanja: 時調), a traditional Korean poetic form, but continued to produce other verse and edited, with others, the poetry anthology Poetry of Three People (Samin sigajip) and an anthology of Sijo, "Garden Balsam Flower" (Bongsa kkot. 봉사꽃, 鳳仙花).

== Works in Korean (Partial) ==
=== Poems ===
- "Fireworks" (Bullori)
- "Shanghai Story" (Sanghae iyagi)
- "China Girl" (Jina sonyeo)
- "At the Park" (Gongwoneseo)
- "To the One Who Would Write a Song" (Noraereul jieusillyeoneun iege)

== Honors ==
To commemorate Chu Yo-han's dedication to the development of the Korean literature and industries, the South Korean government conferred on him posthumously honors of Rose of Sharon (무궁화장) in 1979. In addition that several hymns are composed by him, which contributed development church music of Korea.

== See also ==
- List of Korean-language poets
- Korean poetry
