= Korean metal-type print classical novels =

Old metal-type prints (guhwaljabon) appeared with the introduction of the soft-metal (lead) types (yeonhwalja) and the advancement of modern print technology. A variety of books were printed using old-metal types, including classical novels, modern novels, how-to books, religious publications, and translations. In the late 19th century, lead was considered a new type metal, and as a result, some scholars refer to old metal types as simply “metal types” or “new metal types.” However, considering that lead types were eventually replaced with copper types and computer typesetting in the 1980s, lead-type print is generally referred to as old metal-type print. In old metal-type prints, the sizes of the types are smaller than before, which reduced the gap between the types as well, therefore increasing the amount of information that can be contained within a page. The printing process sped up, and the number of copies increased exponentially. In addition, the topics of the printed books became diversified.

Among them, old metal-type print classical novels refer to the novels that were mass-produced by publishers for profits in the early 20th century. They consist of foreign and Korean novels, their adaptations, or narrative stories based on the classics or historical incidents. Peddlers and merchants supplied the books directly to the readers at low price. These books were also referred to as iyagichaek (story books), ttakjibon (paper tile books), yunjeonsoseol (six penny novels). Ttakjibon was a name given to the books due to the colorful covers, similar to the paper tiles (ttakji) used in games, and yukjeonsoseol was a name printed on the books published by Sinmungwan but came to be used to refer to old metal-type print classic novels in general.

== History ==
Modern metal-type printing in Joseon began with the publication of the newspaper Hanseong sunbo from the Ministry of Presswork and Publication (bangmunguk) in 1883. After 1905, private publishers began to be established, and novels began to be printed in 1906. Old metal-type classical novels were most vigorously printed and sold from 1915 to 1918. After 1927, they gradually declined in popularity and number, were occasionally published in the 1930s and onward, eventually coming to a full stop in 1978. Interestingly, publishers that were active in the 1920s are smaller in number compared to the 1910s. Some of these publishers continued to print classical novels even after the 1930s, but the percentage of classical novels among their publications was greatly reduced.

As mentioned above, old metal-type classical novels were most actively printed and distributed in the 1910s and 1920s. The publication of 328 classical novels can be confirmed, with over 2000 copies. Including the number of publications whose existence can be indirectly confirmed through advertisements, a total of 381 classical novels were printed over 3000 times. Among them, Chunhyang-jeon (The Tale of Chunhyang) has been confirmed to have been printed the most at 109 times, and estimated to have been printed over 167 times, based on including information from indirect sources, such as advertisements.

Old metal-type print classic novels included typeset print versions of handwritten books but were often adaptations of the original handwritten classic novels. Old metal-type print classic novels can be classified into three groups: 1. Typeset print versions of handwritten books; 2. Adaptations of handwritten novels; and 3. Completely new novels that are based on classical novels.

== Features and significance ==
Old type-set print classical novels were criticized for their low literary value compared to sinsoseol (modern fiction, literally “new fiction”), but they were far more popular compared to sinsoseol and widely distributed throughout the era. If the history of literature focuses on the readers’ acceptance of literature, old type-set print classical novels are at the center of Korea's early modern literary history.

The popularity of old type-set print classical novels is also related to the historical background of the time. With the abolition of the class system and the gradual expansion of educational opportunities, hangeul (Korean alphabet) began to be disseminated, which seems to have played an important role in the prevalence of novels written in hangeul. In addition, the censorship system seems to have played a part. Prior to the signing of the Japan-Korea Treaty of 1910, Japan tried to control the freedom of the press in Korea through the enactment of the Newspaper Act in 1907 and the Publication Act in 1909. Although the censorship system was put in place, classical novels were relatively freer from censorship compared to sinsoseol and began to be printed in full swing after 1912.

Publishing capital in early modern Korea adopted lead-type printing technology, which allowed them to mass-print books within a short period, and sold old metal-type print classical novels to make a huge profit. Compared to handwritten editions, printed editions required far lower less production costs, and this led to reduced prices of books as well as mass-production, distribution, and consumption of books. This production method enabled the repeated publication of popular works and solidified the popularity of novels in readers’ minds.
