= Gyeongbu =

Name for Seoul–Busan corridor in Korea

- Hangul: 경부
- Hanja: 京釜
- RR: Gyeongbu
- MR: Kyŏngbu

The name Gyeongbu refers to the Seoul–Busan corridor in South Korea. It is used as the name of the Gyeongbu railway line and Gyeongbu Expressway, both of which connect Seoul—the South Korean capital and largest city—to Busan—the largest port and second-largest city. The name "Gyeongbu" is formed from the first characters in the names "Gyeongseong" 경성 (京城) and "Busan" 부산 (釜山).

== See also ==
- Transportation in South Korea
