= Ch'oe Hae =

Korean writer (1901–1932)

- 최서해, 崔曙海
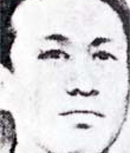
- Born: January 21, 1901; Sŏngjin, Korean Empire
- Died: July 9, 1932 (aged 31); Keijō, Keiki-dō, Korea, Empire of Japan
- Occupation: writer
- Writing career
- Language: Korean, Chinese, Japanese
- Years active: 1918–1932
- Genres: Fiction, Poetry, Essay

Ch'oe Hae (Korean: 최서해; Hanja: 崔曙海; 21 January 1901 – 9 July 1932) was a Korean poet and novelist during the Japanese colonial period. His real name is Choi Hak-song (崔鶴松) and his pseudonym is Seohae (曙海). In 1918, he made his debut as a poet through the poem Moonlight in Woohu Garden in Hakjigwang and debuted as a novelist in 1924 through the novel Homeland in Chosun Mundan.

== Career ==
He was born on 21 January 1901 in Sŏngjin, North Hamgyong Province, Korean Empire. His father was an oriental medicine doctor and Ch'oe learned Chinese from him when he was young. Around 1910, his father left the family and went to Manchuria. Ch'oe enrolled in Sŏngjin School and dropped out in the fifth grade. This was Ch'oe's last education. He loved to read novels since childhood. When he was 17, he was moved by reading "Insensitive" by Lee Kwang Soo and wrote a letter to Lee.

== Chronology ==
- Dropped out of Seongjin Primary School in North Hamgyeong, Korea
- Correspondent for Keijō Nippō (1919–1921)
- Shanghai Communist Party Party Committee Member (1921–1922)
- KAPF General Affairs Commissioner and Secretary (1925–1926)
- Correspondent for Sidae Ilbo (1926)
- Correspondent of Joongoe Ilbo's academic department (1926–1927)
- Deputy Director of the Arts Department of Joongoe Ilbo (1927–1928)
- Joongoe Ilbo Curatorial Director (1928–1929)
- Gyeongseong Maeil Shinbo Curatorial Director (1929–1931)

== Family and relatives ==
- Spouse: Jo Bun-nyeo (August 9, 1893 – September 23, 1982 (age 89), graduated from Yeonggwang Elementary School in Jeollanam-do, Korean Empire in 1906).
- Children: 2 sons and 1 daughter (The eldest daughter (first) passed away prematurely due to an illness (pneumonia).

== Literature ==
- Structure of Modern Korean Novels Kim Young-hwa, Taekwang Munhwasa (1977)
- Study of Korean Biography Writers (1980)
