= Choe Cheok jeon =

1621 Chinese-language Korean novel

Choe Cheok jeon (Korean: 최척전; Hanja: 崔陟傳; MR: Ch'oech'ŏkchŏn; lit. The Tale of Choe Cheok) is a classic Korean novel by Jo Wi-han. It is set in the late 16th and early 17th century in Joseon, Japan, China, and Vietnam, and depicts a family's diaspora and reunion during the turmoil of wars that swept East Asia. The protagonists Choe Cheok and Ok-yeong overcome the atrocities of war and reunite. The narrative is primarily written in Chinese and considered biographical.

== Authorship and publication ==
The novel is a classic Korean novel written by Jo Wi-han (趙緯韓, 1567–1649) and published in 1621. Jo served as an official during the reigns of Prince Gwanghae (r. 1608–1623) and King Injo (r. 1623–1649). During his tenure, he experienced a series of tumultuous, domestic, and international historical incidents, including the Japanese invasions of Korea (1592–1598), the Injo Restoration (1623), and the Qing invasion of Joseon (1636). Choe cheok jeon is said to have been written while Jo was staying in Namwon as a retiree from public service after he learned about Choe Cheok's troubled life. Jo was close friends with other prominent writers of the time, including Hŏ Kyun (1569–1618) and Gwon Pil (權韠, 1569–1612).

== Plot ==
Choe Cheok is from Namwon, Jeolla-do Province. He falls in love with Ok-yeong while studying at the home of one of his father's friends. He proposes to her, and after Ok-yeong persuades her parents to overlook his financial status, they become engaged. However, the Japanese invade Joseon days before their marriage. Choe Cheok joins the army and goes to war, and Ok-yeong's parents arrange her marriage with a rich man named Yang-saeng. After failing to persuade her parents, she attempts to take her own life by hanging herself, and stops her parents from insisting she marry Yang-saeng.

Choe Cheok and Ok-yeong get married, have a son, Mong-seok, and live a happy life together. The Japanese forces invade Namwon, and the family hides in Jirisan Mountain. While Choe Cheok is away from home searching for food, the Japanese come across their shelter. Ok-gyeong is captured by an old Japanese soldier named Don-u. Having lost his family, Choe Cheok experiences a mental breakdown and moves to Ming China, following Yeo Yu-mun (余有文), a Ming dynasty general. Meanwhile, Choe Cheok's father and Ok-yeong's mother survived the war and return home to take care of their grandson Mong-seok.

Don-u, who kidnapped Ok-yeong but takes good care of her, disguises her as a man and they become merchants sailing around foreign countries on a trade ship, while Choe Cheok frequently visits Vietnam on a trade ship with his friend Song-u (宋佑). One night, Choe Cheok plays a bamboo flute at a port in Vietnam. Ok-yeong hears the flute and recites a Chinese poem only she and her husband know about. The next day, Choe Cheok reunites with Ok-yeong, and they return home and have their second son Mong-seon, who later marries Hong-do (紅桃), daughter of Jin Wi-gyeong (陳偉慶), who is a Chinese soldier that was dispatched to Joseon during the Japanese invasions of Korea.

When the Later Jin invades the Ming dynasty in China, Choe Cheok is drafted again to the Ming forces, saddening Ok-yeong, who fears that her husband may not return home alive. The Ming forces suffer a great defeat and Choe Cheok becomes a prisoner of war. In the concentration camp, he encounters Mong-seok, who joined the Joseon forces (which entered the war following the request from Ming China) and become a prisoner of war after the defeat of his forces. With the help of a sympathetic Later Jin soldier, Choe Cheok and his son safely escape from the camp but face trouble when Choe Cheok develops abscesses on his back on the way to Namwon. They come across a Ming person named Jin Wi-gyeong who treats Choe Cheok well. Choe Cheok realizes that Jin is the father of Hong-do, his Chinese daughter-in-law, and he and his son return home with Jin, 20 years after leaving Namwon, and reunite with the rest of the family in Joseon.

Ok-yeong, who was separated from Choe Cheok and left Joseon, prepares to return home upon hearing the rumor that, although the Ming forces were defeated, many Joseon people survived and returned home. During the journey, Ok-yeong and her family are caught by a sea storm, become stranded on a deserted island, and lose their ship to pirates, but are soon rescued by a Joseon trade ship returning from Vietnam. Ok-yeong, along with Mong-seon and his wife, return to Namwon, reuniting with Choe Cheok. Likewise, Jin reunites with his daughter Hong-do in Joseon, and they live happily ever after.

== Features and significance ==
Among 17th-century Korean novels, Choe Cheok jeon is regarded as the most realistic representation of society at the time because it depicted atrocities of war that took place during the period of a hegemonic shift in East Asia associated with the Japanese invasions of Korea, the war between Ming China and Later Jin, and other wars. The novel is also significant in that it expanded the narrative space from Korea to China, Japan, and Vietnam; it created an archetype of an active and energetic woman through the protagonist Ok-yeong; and has a favorable view of international marriage (e.g. the marriage between Mong-seon and Hong-do) and foreigners.

Choe Cheok jeon is a rare work among classical Korean novels as its author and publication date are known despite the conservative ethos of the Joseon society that was critical of novels. The novel has been considered a Buddhist novel, a historical novel, or a romance novel as it combines diverse story elements. The short story Hong-do, (紅桃, The Tale of Hong-do) appearing in Eou yadam (於于野談, Eou's Unofficial Histories) and written by Yu Mong-in (柳夢寅, 1559–1623), has a plot that develops similarly to Choe Cheok jeon. Likewise, Gimyeongcheoljeon (김영철전, "The Tale of Kim Yeong-cheol") written by Hong Se-tae (洪世泰, 1653–1725) is often mentioned along with Choe Cheok jeon because it also deals with the issue of war and separated families.

== Texts ==
Five transcribed copies of Choe Cheok jeon (Seoul National University edition, Korea University edition, Kim Mo edition, and Gan Ho-yun edition), along with one transcribed copy of its Korean translation (Yonsei University edition) and five transcribed copies of the abbreviated versions of the novel, have survived to the present day. Among these, the most well-known is the Seoul National University edition. Its front cover says 奇遇錄, or "record of a bizarre meeting," and the first inner page says 崔陟傳, or "the tale of Choe Cheok". The book consists of 32 pages, with each page featuring nine lines containing up to 30 letters.
