= Sinsosŏl =

Korean literary genre

- Hangul: 신소설
- Hanja: 新小說
- RR: sinsoseol
- MR: sinsosŏl

Sinsosŏl (Korean: 신소설; Hanja: 新小說; lit. 'new novel') was a genre of Korean literature which began and grew during the Korean Empire, in the late 19th and early 20th century. It was sometimes referred to as kaehwagi sosŏl (개화기 소설; lit. 'enlightenment period fiction').

== Occurrence ==
The enlightenment period (개화기) changed Korean people's thoughts greatly. Some writers who wanted to enlighten people also appeared. Publishers imported modern printers so that they could sell many more books.

== Contents ==
Usually, the contents of sinsosŏl highlight enlightenment, or modernization. Encouragement of education, exploding old customs and superstitions, and criticism of corrupt officials are common themes of sinsosŏl.

== Major writers ==
- Yi In-jik (이인직): Hyeorui nu (혈의 누, Tears of blood), Gwiui seong (귀의 성, Ghost sound; 1906), Eunsegye (은세계, Silver world; 1908)
- Yi Hae-jo (이해조): Jayujong (자유종, Bell of liberty; 1910)
- Ahn Guk-sun (안국선): Geumsuhoeuirok (금수회의록, Proceedings of the animal meeting; 1908)

== Fall in popularity ==
Sinsosŏl was eventually replaced by modern novels.
