= The Cloud Dream of the Nine =

Korean novella (17th century)

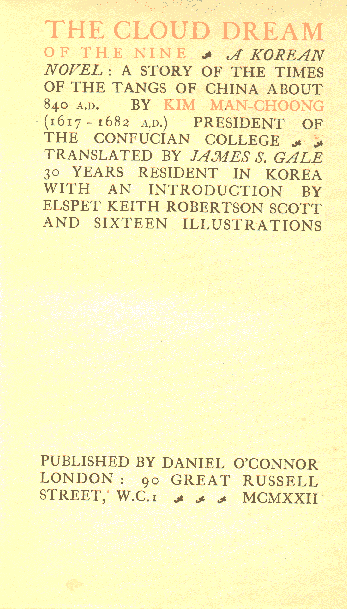
The title page of Gale's translation, The Westminster Press

The Cloud Dream of the Nine, also translated as The Nine Cloud Dream (Korean: 구운몽; Hanja: 九雲夢; RR: Kuunmong), is a 17th-century Korean novel set in the Chinese Tang dynasty. Although widely attributed to Kim Man-jung, there have been some arguments about whether he was the original author. However, as both a Hanmun and fantasy novel, it was not something a Korean scholar of the 17th century would own up to writing. The consensus of the Korean scholarly community is that Kim Man-jung was the author.

It has been called "one of the most beloved masterpieces in Korean literature." It was the first literary work from Korea to be translated into English, by James Scarth Gale in 1922. Richard Rutt's translation entitled A Nine Cloud Dream appeared in 1974. In 2019, Heinz Insu Fenkl published a new translation entitled The Nine Cloud Dream including his lengthy introduction with Penguin Classics which was hailed by The New York Times as one of the most anticipated books of 2019.

The Cloud Dream of the Nine is written by a scholar well versed in Classical Chinese literature and expresses Confucian, Taoist and Buddhist concepts, and could be called a Buddhist romance. The oldest existing text of the book was written in Classical Chinese.

== Plot ==
(The plot is translated from the German wikipage: Guunmong.)

The framework of the story is the education of the youngest monk, Seongjin, in the monastery on the Lotus Peak. He is sent to the Dragon King by his master Yookgwan. On the way back he meets eight fairies on a bridge. Since he cannot avoid them, he has a conversation with them, after which he is seen to have worldly desires. He is banished by his master to hell (the world of humans.) There he receives his punishment: he is reborn as the son of a hermit and his wife. This is how the story of Yang Soyu begins, who forgets his previous life as a Buddhist monk early in childhood.

His father leaves the family when Yang Soyu is ten years old. At the age of 14, Soyu says goodbye to his mother to take the civil service examination in the capital. On the journey to Jangan he meets Jin Chaebong, the daughter of an official, and is prevented from traveling any further due to war. A year later, in Nakyang, he meets Gye Seomwol, who is highly respected in a circle of poets. He travels on to the capital, where he takes first place in the civil service examination. In the capital, he disguises himself as a female musician in order to meet the daughter of Minister Jung, Gyeongpae, with whom he eventually becomes engaged. Due to his talent, the emperor sends him to wars in which Yang Soyu's tactics help the imperial troops to victory, and the emperor appoints him chancellor. He is supposed to marry the emperor's sister, Princess Nanyang, but this is only possible after his fiancée Gyeongpae has been adopted by the empress dowager. Yang Soyu is allowed to marry the two women and bring all the other female acquaintances from his previous journeys to court as concubines - these eight women are the fairies he met as Seongjin in front of the bridge.

After Yang Soyu retires after many years and with children and grandchildren, he becomes aware of how quickly the lives of great men pass and he wants to devote himself to Buddhism. At this point, a monk visits him and asks him if he no longer remembers him. It is his master Yookgwan who wakes him up again as Seongjin: he had dreamed it all.

== In popular culture ==
- Uhm Jung-hwa's 2017 studio album The Cloud Dream Of The Nine is named after the novel.
- In the Kdrama My Love from the Star, the male lead character Do Min-joon says he lives by this book.
