= Hanja =

Chinese characters used in Korean writing

- The Korean word Hanja (Chinese script) in Hanja (top) and Hangul (bottom).
- Script type: Logographic
- Period: 400 BC – present
- Languages: Korean, Classical Chinese

Related scripts
- Parent systems: Oracle bone script: Seal script; Clerical script; Regular script; Hanja
- Sister systems: Kanji, traditional Chinese, simplified Chinese, Khitan script, Chữ Hán, Chữ Nôm, Jurchen script, Tangut script

ISO 15924
- ISO 15924: Hani (500), Han (Hanzi, Kanji, Hanja)

Unicode
- Unicode alias: Han

Korean name
- Hangul: 한자
- Hanja: 漢字
- RR: Hanja
- MR: Hancha

Hanja (Korean: 한자; Hanja: 漢字; IPA: [ha(ː)ntɕ͈a]), alternatively spelled Hancha, are Chinese characters used to write the Korean language. (Note: In Korean, the term Hanja literally means "Han characters".) After characters were introduced to Korea to write Literary Chinese, they were adapted to write Korean as early as the Gojoseon period.

Hanjaeo (한자어; 漢字語) refers to Sino-Korean vocabulary, which can be written with Hanja, and hanmun (한문; 漢文) refers to Classical Chinese writing, although Hanja is also sometimes used to encompass both concepts. Because Hanja characters have never undergone any major reforms, they more closely resemble traditional Chinese and traditional Japanese characters, although the stroke orders for certain characters are slightly different. Such examples are the characters 教 and 敎, as well as 研 and 硏. Only a small number of Hanja characters were modified or are unique to Korean, with the rest being identical to the traditional Chinese characters. By contrast, many of the Chinese characters currently in use in mainland China, Malaysia and Singapore have been simplified, and contain fewer strokes than the corresponding Hanja characters.

Until the contemporary period, Korean documents, history, literature and records were written primarily in Literary Chinese using Hanja as its primary script. As early as 1446, King Sejong the Great promulgated Hangul (also known as Chosŏn'gŭl in North Korea) through the Hunminjeongeum. It did not come into widespread official use until the late 19th and early 20th century. Proficiency in Chinese characters is, therefore, necessary to study Korean history. Etymology of Sino-Korean words is reflected in Hanja.

Hanja were once used to write native Korean words, in a variety of systems collectively known as idu, but, by the 20th century, Koreans used hanja only for writing Sino-Korean words, while writing native vocabulary and loanwords from other languages in Hangul, a system known as mixed script. By the 21st century, even Sino-Korean words are usually written in the Hangul alphabet, with the corresponding Chinese character sometimes written next to it to prevent confusion if there are other characters or words with the same Hangul spelling. According to the Standard Korean Language Dictionary published by the National Institute of Korean Language (NIKL), approximately half (50%) of Korean words are Sino-Korean, mostly in academic fields (science, government, and society). Other dictionaries, such as the Urimal Keun Sajeon, claim this number might be as low as roughly 30%.

== History ==
=== Introduction of literary Chinese to Korea ===
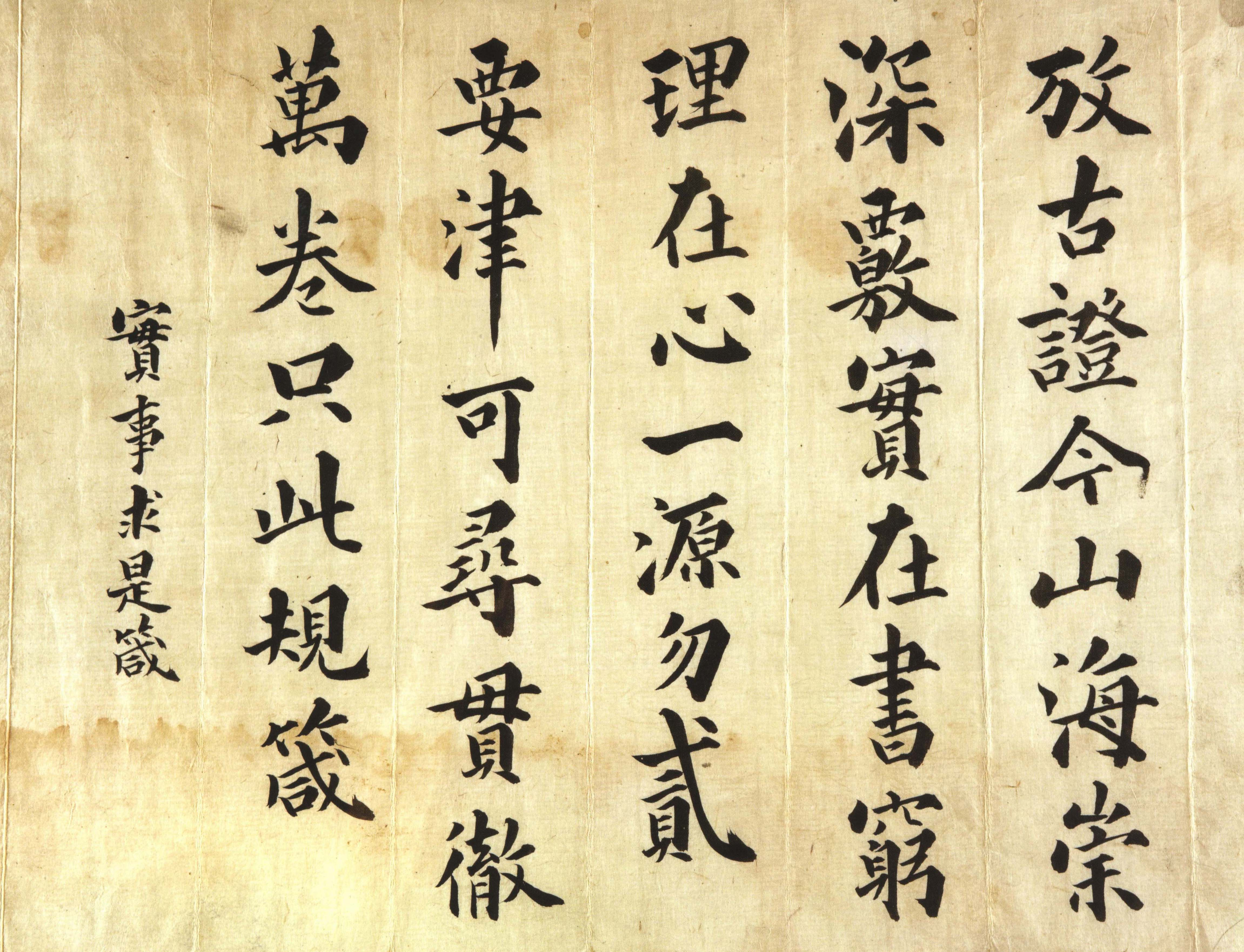
The calligraphy of Korean scholar, poet and painter Kim Chŏnghŭi (김정희; 金正喜) of the early nineteenth century. Like most educated Koreans from the Three Kingdom period until the fall of the Joseon dynasty in 1910, Gim Jeong-hui composed most of his works in hanmun or literary Chinese.

There is traditionally no accepted date for when literary Chinese (한문; 漢文; hanmun) written in Chinese characters (한자; 漢字; hanja) entered Korea. Early Chinese dynastic histories, the only sources for very early Korea, do not mention a Korean writing system. During the 3rd century BC, Chinese migrations into the peninsula occurred due to war in northern China and the earliest archaeological evidence of Chinese writing appearing in Korea is dated to this period. A large number of inscribed knife money from pre-Lelang sites along the Yalu River have been found. A sword dated to 222 BC with Chinese engraving was unearthed in Pyongyang.

From 108 BC to 313 AD, the Han dynasty established the Four Commanderies of Han in northern Korea and institutionalized the Chinese language. According to the Samguk sagi, Goguryeo had hanmun from the beginning of its existence, which starts in 37 BC. It also says that the king of Goguryeo composed a poem in 17 BC. The Gwanggaeto Stele, dated to 414, is the earliest securely dated relic bearing hanmun inscriptions. Hanmun became commonplace in Goguryeo during the 5th and 6th centuries and according to the Book of Zhou, the Chinese classics were available in Goguryeo by the end of the 6th century. The Samguk sagi mentions written records in Baekje beginning in 375 and Goguryeo annals prior to 600. Japanese chronicles mention Baekje people as teachers of hanmun. According to the Book of Liang, the people of Silla did not have writing in the first half of the 6th century but this may have been only referring to agreements and contracts, represented by notches on wood. The Bei Shi, covering the period 386–618, says that the writing, armour, and weapons in Silla were the same as those in China. The Samguk sagi says that records were kept in Silla starting in 545.

Some western writers claimed that knowledge of Chinese entered Korea with the spread of Buddhism, which occurred around the 4th century. Traditionally Buddhism is believed to have been introduced to Goguryeo in 372, Baekje in 384, and Silla in 527.

Another major factor in the adoption of hanmun was the adoption of the gwageo, copied from the Chinese imperial examination, open to all freeborn men. Special schools were set up for the well-to-do and the nobility across Korea to train new scholar officials for civil service. Adopted by Silla and Goryeo, the gwageo system was maintained by Goryeo until after the unification of Korea at the end of the nineteenth century. The scholarly elite began learning the hanja by memorizing the Thousand Character Classic (천자문; 千字文; Cheonjamun), Three Character Classic (삼자경; 三字經; Samja Gyeong) and Hundred Family Surnames (백가성; 百家姓; Baekga Seong). Passage of the gwageo required the thorough ability to read, interpret and compose passages of works such as the Analects (논어; 論語; Non-eo), Great Learning (대학; 大學; Daehak), Doctrine of the Mean (중용; 中庸; Jung-yong), Mencius (맹자; 孟子; Maengja), Classic of Poetry (시경; 詩經; Sigyeong), Book of Documents (서경; 書經; Seogyeong), Classic of Changes (역경; 易經; Yeokgyeong), Spring and Autumn Annals (춘추; 春秋; Chunchu) and Book of Rites (예기; 禮記; Yegi). Other important works include the Art of War (손자병법; 孫子兵法; Sonja Byeongbeop), Selections of Refined Literature (문선; 文選; Munseon), etc.

The Korean scholars were very proficient in literary Chinese. The craftsmen and scholars of Baekje were renowned in Japan, and were eagerly sought as teachers due to their proficiency in hanmun. Korean scholars also composed all diplomatic records, government records, scientific writings, religious literature and much poetry in hanmun, demonstrating that the Korean scholars were not just reading Chinese works but were actively composing their own. Well-known examples of Chinese-language literature in Korea include Samguk sagi, Samguk yusa, Kŭmo sinhwa, The Cloud Dream of the Nine, Akhak gwebeom, Hong Gildong jeon and Domundaejak.

=== Adaptation of hanja to Korean ===
The Chinese language, however, was quite different from the Korean language, consisting of terse, often monosyllabic words with a strictly analytic, SVO structure in stark contrast to the generally polysyllabic, very synthetic, SOV structure, with various grammatical endings that encoded person, levels of politeness and case found in Korean. Despite the adoption of literary Chinese as the written language, Chinese never replaced Korean as the spoken language, even amongst the scholars who had immersed themselves in its study.

The first attempts to make literary Chinese texts more accessible to Korean readers were hanmun passages written in Korean word order. This would later develop into the gugyeol (구결; 口訣) or 'separated phrases,' system. Chinese texts were broken into meaningful blocks, and in the spaces were inserted hanja used to represent the sound of native Korean grammatical endings. As literary Chinese was very terse, leaving much to be understood from context, the insertion of occasional verbs and grammatical markers helped to clarify the meaning. For instance, the hanja '爲' was used for its native Korean gloss whereas '尼' was used for its Sino-Korean pronunciation, and combined into '爲尼' and read hani (하니), 'to do (and so).' In Chinese, however, the same characters are read in Mandarin as the expression wéi ní, meaning 'becoming a nun'. This is a typical example of Gugyeol words where the radical '爲' is read in Korean for its meaning (hă—'to do'), whereas the suffix '尼', ni (meaning 'nun'), is used phonetically. Special symbols were sometimes used to aid in the reordering of words in an approximation of Korean grammar. It was similar to the kanbun (漢文) system developed in Japan to render Chinese texts. The system was not a translation of Chinese into Korean, but an attempt to make Korean speakers knowledgeable in hanja to overcome the difficulties in interpreting Chinese texts. Although it was developed by scholars of the early Goryeo Kingdom (918–1392), gugyeol was of particular importance during the Joseon period, extending into the first decade of the twentieth century, since all civil servants were required to be able to read, translate and interpret Confucian texts and commentaries.

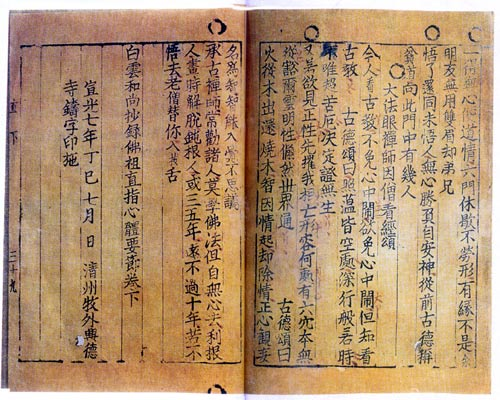
The Korean Baegun Hwasang Chorok Buljo Jikji Simche Yojeol (백운화상초록불조직지심체요절; 白雲和尙抄錄佛祖直指心體要節) or roughly 'Anthology of Great Buddhist Priests' Zen Teachings Copied by Monk Baegun' is the oldest example of a book printed with moveable type and was printed in Korea in 1377, but is written in literary Chinese.

The first attempt at transcribing Korean in hanja was the idu (이두; 吏讀), or 'official reading,' system that began to appear after 500 AD. In this system, the hanja were chosen for their equivalent native Korean gloss. For example, the hanja '不冬' signifies 'no winter' or 'not winter' and has the formal Sino-Korean pronunciation of '부동' budong, similar to Mandarin bù dōng. Instead, it was read as andeul '안들' which is the Middle Korean pronunciation of the characters' native gloss and is the ancestor to modern anneunda '않는다', 'do not' or 'does not.' The various idu conventions were developed in the Goryeo period but were particularly associated with the jung-in (중인; 中人), the upper middle class of the early Joseon period.

A subset of idu was known as hyangchal (향찰; 鄕札), 'village notes,' and was a form of idu particularly associated with the hyangga (향가; 鄕歌) the old poetry compilations and some new creations preserved in the first half of the Goryeo period when its popularity began to wane. In the hyangchal or 'village letters' system, there was free choice in how a particular hanja was used. For example, to indicate the topic of Princess Seonhwa, a daughter of King Jinpyeong of Silla was recorded as '善化公主主隱' in hyangchal and was read as (선화공주님은), seonhwa gongju-nim-eun where '善化公主' is read in Sino-Korean, as it is a Sino-Korean name and the Sino-Korean term for 'princess' was already adopted as a loan word. The hanja '主隱,' however, was read according to their native pronunciation but was not used for its literal meaning signifying 'the prince steals' but to the native postpositions '님' nim, the honorific marker used after professions and titles, and '은' eun, the topic marker. In mixed script, this would be rendered as '善化公主님은'.

Hanja was the sole means of writing Korean until King Sejong the Great invented and tried to promote Hangul in the 15th century. Even after the invention of Hangul, however, most Korean scholars continued to write in hanmun, although Hangul did see considerable popular use. Idu and its hyangchal variant were mostly replaced by mixed-script writing with hangul although idu was not officially discontinued until 1894 when reforms abolished its usage in administrative records of civil servants. Even with idu, most literature and official records were still recorded in literary Chinese until 1910.

=== Decline of Hanja ===
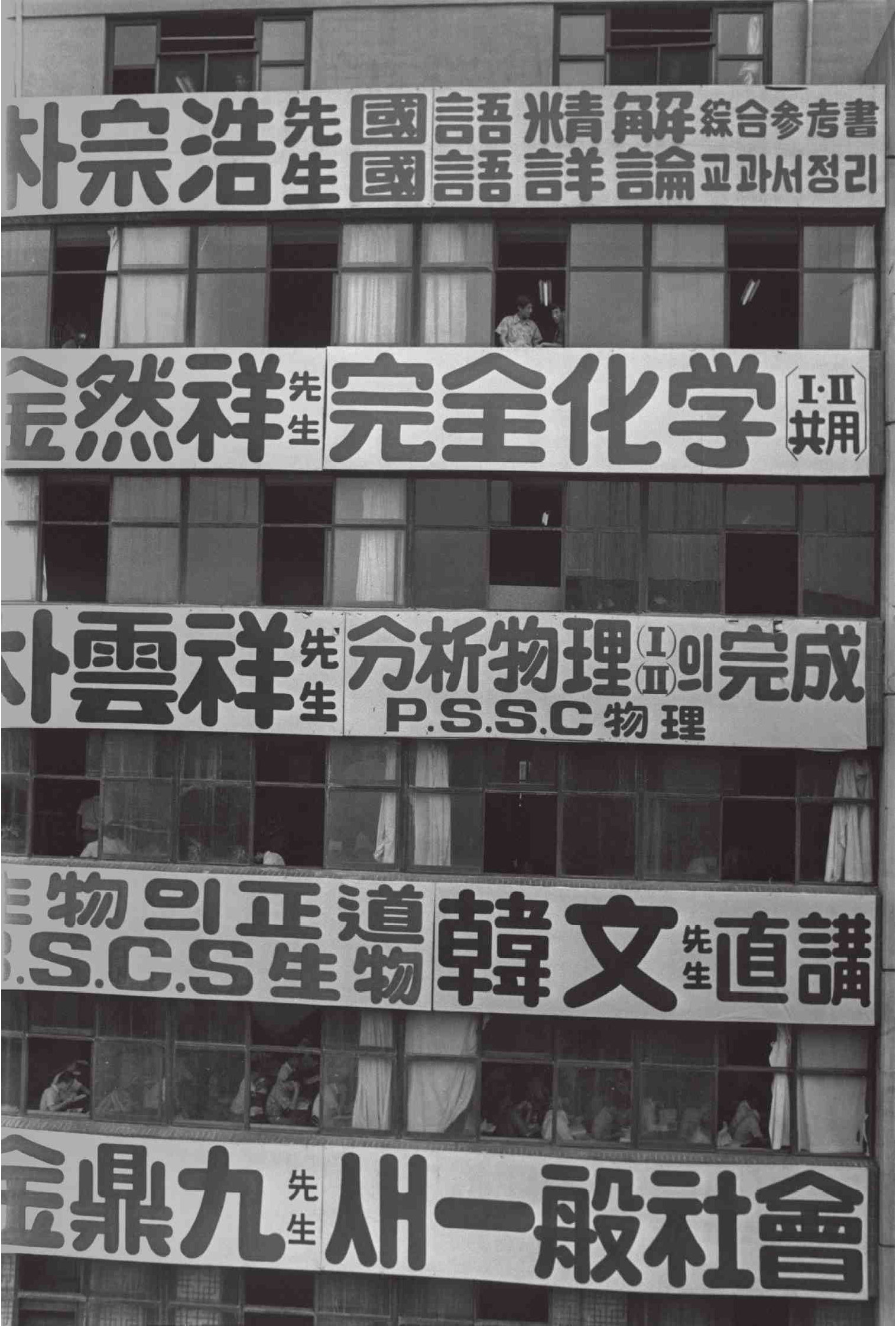
Advertisements for hagwons (cram schools) in Seoul in 1971. Most of the text is in hanja, before the decline in its use.

The Hangul-Hanja mixed script was a commonly used means of writing, and Hangul effectively replaced Hanja in official and scholarly writing only in the 20th century. Hangul-exclusive writing has been used in Korea after the decline of literary Chinese.

==== Decline in South Korea ====
The mixed script could be commonly found in non-fiction writing, newspapers, etc., until the enacting of President Park Chung Hee's 5-Year Plan for Hangul Exclusivity (한글전용 5개년 계획안; 한글專用 5個年 計劃案; Hangeuljeonyong Ogaenyeon Gyehoegan) in 1968 removed the use and teaching of Hanja in public schools and in the military, to eliminate Hanja in writing by 1972 through legislative and executive means. However, due to public backlash, in 1972, Park's government allowed for the teaching of Hanja as a subject, but upheld the removal on Hanja use in textbooks and other learning materials outside of the classes. This reverse step, however, was optional, so the availability of Hanja education was dependent on the school one went to.

Another reason for the decline is found in the Hangul typewriters and computer keyboards. The push for better Hangul typewriters mainly began in 1949, but as it was long before the Hanja ban, government institutions did not prefer typewriters altogether as they could not write in Hanja nor the mixed script. Kong Byung Wo's notable Sebeolsik type first appeared in March 1949, jointly winning second place in the Joseon Balmyong Jangryohoe's (조선발명장려회) Hangul type contest, and Kim Dong Hoon's typewriter winning joint 3rd. During the 50s and 60s, alongside the Korean government's support for typewriting, new Hangul typewriters were developed, distributed, and adopted. Hangul type with both horizontal writing and moa-sseugi (모아쓰기; the style of Hangul where Hangul consonants and vowels mix in together to form a full letter, which is the default style being used today) first appeared in the same period as government policy. With further adoption, during the 1970s, even when Hanja and mixed script were still used widely in society both as a writing system and as a style option, Koreans mostly gave up on mixed script at least in government documents and memorandums; The use of Hanja in type hindered the speed of writing and printing compared to only-Hangul usage, especially after the advent of the Sebeolsik layout (세벌식 자판; 세벌式 字板).

Park's Hanja ban was not formally lifted until 1992 under the government of Kim Young-sam. In 1999, the government of Kim Dae-jung actively promoted Hanja by placing it on signs on the road, at bus stops, and in subways. In 1999, Han Mun was reintroduced as a school elective and in 2001 the Hanja Proficiency Test (한자능력검정시험; 漢字能力檢定試驗; Hanja Neungnyeok Geomjeong Siheom) was introduced. In 2005, an older law, the Law Concerning Hangul Exclusivity (한글전용에 관한 법률; 한글專用에 關한 法律; Hangeuljeonyonge Gwanhan Beomnyul) was repealed as well. In 2013, all elementary schools in Seoul started teaching Hanja. However, the result is that Koreans who were educated in this period having never been formally educated in Hanja are unable to use them, and thus the use of Hanja has plummeted in writing until the modern day. Hanja is now very rarely used and is almost only used for abbreviations in newspaper headlines (e.g. 中 for China, 韓 for Korea, 美 for the United States, 日 for Japan, etc.), for clarification in text where a word might be confused for another due to homophones (e.g. 이 사장 (李 社長) vs. 이사장 (理事長)), or for stylistic use such as the 辛 (신라면; 辛拉麵) used on Shin Ramyun packaging.

==== Decline in North Korea ====
Since June 1949, Hanja has not officially been used in North Korea, and, in addition, most texts are now commonly written horizontally instead of vertically. Many words borrowed from Chinese have also been replaced in the North with native Korean words, due to the North's policy of linguistic purism. Nevertheless, a large number of Chinese-borrowed words are still widely used in the North (although written in Hangul), and Hanja still appear in special contexts, such as recent North Korean dictionaries. The replacement has been less total in South Korea where, although usage has declined over time, some Hanja remain in common usage in some contexts.

== Character formation ==
Each Hanja is composed of one of 214 radicals plus in most cases one or more additional elements. The vast majority of Hanja use additional elements to indicate the sound of the character, but a few Hanja are purely pictographic, and some were formed in other ways.

The historical use of Hanja in Korea has changed over time. Hanja became prominent in use by the elite class between the 3rd and 4th centuries by the Three Kingdoms. The use came from the Chinese that migrated into Korea. With them they brought the writing system Hanja. Thus the hanja being used came from the characters already being used by the Chinese at the time.

Since Hanja was primarily used by the elite and scholars, it was hard for others to learn, thus much character development was limited. Scholars in the 4th century used this to study and write Confucian classics. Character formation is also coined to the idu form which was a Buddhist writing system for Chinese characters. This practice was limited however, depending on whether the opinion of Buddhism was favorable or not at the time.

== Eumhun ==
To aid in understanding the meaning of a character, or to describe it orally to distinguish it from other characters with the same pronunciation, character dictionaries and school textbooks refer to each character with a combination of its sound and a word indicating its meaning. This dual meaning-sound reading of a character is called eumhun (음훈; 音訓; from 音 'sound' + 訓 'meaning,' 'teaching').

The word or words used to denote the meaning are often—though hardly always—words of native Korean (i.e., non-Chinese) origin, and are sometimes archaic words no longer commonly used.

== Education ==
=== South ===
South Korean primary schools ceased the teaching of Hanja in elementary schools in the 1970s, although they are still taught as part of the mandatory curriculum in grade 6. They are taught in separate courses in South Korean high schools, separately from the normal Korean-language curriculum. Formal Hanja education begins in grade 7 (junior high school) and continues until graduation from senior high school in grade 12.

A total of 1,800 Hanja are taught: 900 for junior high, and 900 for senior high (starting in grade 10). Post-secondary Hanja education continues in some liberal-arts universities. The 1972 promulgation of basic Hanja for educational purposes changed on 31 December 2000, to replace 44 Hanja with 44 others.

South Korea's Ministry of Education generally encourages all primary schools to offer Hanja classes. Officials said that learning Chinese characters could enhance students' Korean language proficiency. Initially announced as a mandatory requirement, it is now considered optional.

=== North ===
Though North Korea rapidly abandoned the general use of Hanja soon after independence, the number of Hanja taught in primary and secondary schools is actually greater than the 1,800 taught in South Korea. Kim Il Sung had earlier called for a gradual elimination of the use of Hanja, but by the 1960s, he had reversed his stance; he was quoted as saying in 1966, "While we should use as few Sinitic terms as possible, students must be exposed to the necessary Chinese characters and taught how to write them."

As a result, a Chinese-character textbook was designed for North Korean schools for use in grades 5–9, teaching 1,500 characters, with another 500 for high school students. College students are exposed to another 1,000, bringing the total to 3,000.

== Uses ==
Because many different Hanja—and thus, many different words written using Hanja—often share the same sounds, two distinct Hanja words (Hanjaeo) may be spelled identically in the phonetic Hangul alphabet. Hanja's language of origin, Chinese, has many homophones, and Hanja words became even more homophonic when they came into Korean, since Korean is not a tonal language, which is how Chinese distinguishes many words that would otherwise be homophonic. For example, while 道, 刀, and 島 are all phonetically distinct in Mandarin (pronounced dào, dāo, and dǎo respectively), they are all pronounced do (도) in Korean. For this reason, Hanja are often used to clarify meaning, either on their own without the equivalent Hangul spelling or in parentheses after the Hangul spelling as a kind of gloss. Hanja is often also used as a form of shorthand in newspaper headlines, advertisements, and on signs, for example the banner at the funeral for the sailors lost in the sinking of ROKS Cheonan (PCC-772).

=== Print media ===
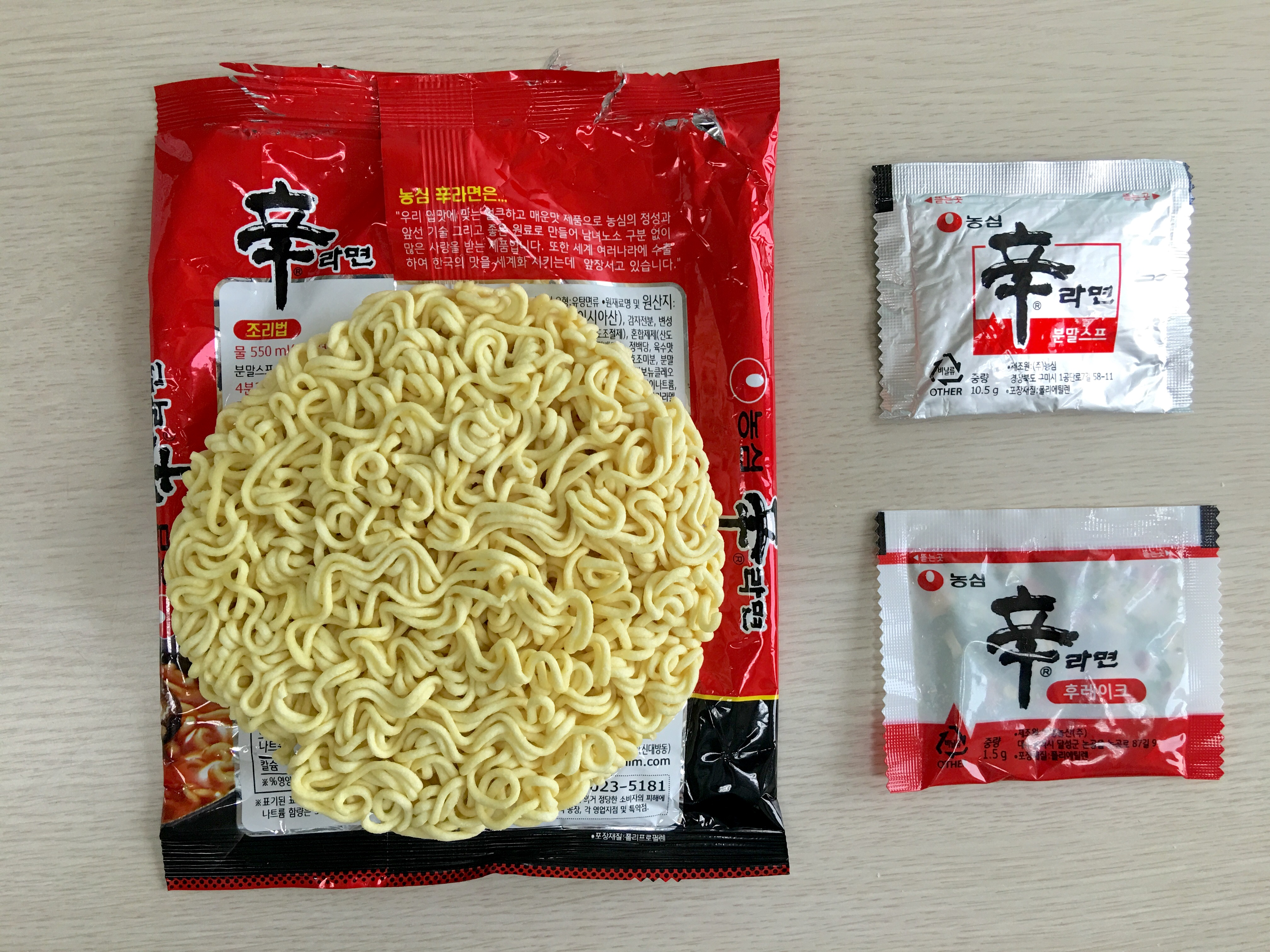
A packet of Shin Ramyun. The Chinese character 辛, meaning 'spicy', is prominently displayed.

In South Korea, Hanja is used most frequently in ancient literature, legal documents, and scholarly monographs, where they often appear without the equivalent Hangul spelling. Usually, only those words with a specialized or ambiguous meaning are printed in Hanja. In mass-circulation books and magazines, Hanja is generally used rarely, and only to gloss words already spelled in Hangul when the meaning is ambiguous. Hanja are also often used in newspaper headlines as abbreviations or to eliminate ambiguity.

In formal publications, personal names are also usually glossed in Hanja in parentheses next to the Hangul. Aside from academic usage, Hanja are often used for advertising or decorative purposes in South Korea, and appear frequently in athletic events and cultural parades, packaging and labeling, dictionaries and atlases. For example, the Hanja 辛 (sin or shin, meaning 'spicy') appears prominently on packages of Shin Ramyun noodles. In contrast, North Korea eliminated the use of Hanja even in academic publications by 1949 on the orders of Kim Il Sung, a situation that has since remained unchanged.

=== Dictionaries ===
In modern Korean dictionaries, all entry words of Sino-Korean origin are printed in Hangul and listed in Hangul order, with the Hanja given in parentheses immediately following the entry word.

This practice helps to eliminate ambiguity, and it also serves as a sort of shorthand etymology, since the meaning of the Hanja and the fact that the word is composed of Hanja often help to illustrate the word's origin.

As an example of how Hanja can help to clear up ambiguity, many homophones can be distinguished by using Hanja. An example is the word 수도 (sudo), which may have meanings such as:

1. 修道: spiritual discipline
2. 囚徒: prisoner
3. 水都: 'city of water' (e.g. Venice or Suzhou)
4. 水稻: paddy rice
5. 水道: drain, rivers, path of surface water
6. 隧道: tunnel
7. 首都: capital (city)
8. 手刀: hand knife

Hanja dictionaries for specialist usage – Jajeon (자전; 字典) or Okpyeon (옥편; 玉篇) – are organized by radical (the traditional Chinese method of classifying characters).

=== Personal names ===
Korean personal names, including all Korean surnames and most Korean given names, are based on Hanja and are generally written in it, although some exceptions exist. On business cards, the use of Hanja is slowly fading away, with most older people displaying their names exclusively in Hanja while most of the younger generation using both Hangul and Hanja. Korean personal names usually consist of a one-character family name (seong, 성; 姓) followed by a two-character given name (ireum, 이름). There are a few two-character family names (e.g. 남궁; 南宮, Namgung), and the holders of such names—but not only them—tend to have one-syllable given names. Traditionally, the given name in turn consists of one character unique to the individual and one character shared by all people in a family of the same sex and generation (see Generation name).

During the Japanese administration of Korea (1910–1945), Koreans were forced to adopt Japanese-style names, including polysyllabic readings of the Hanja, but this practice was reversed by post-independence governments in Korea. Since the 1970s, some parents have given their children given names that are simply native Korean words. Popular ones include Haneul (하늘)—meaning 'sky'—and Iseul (이슬)—meaning 'morning dew'. Nevertheless, on official documents, people's names are still recorded in both Hangul and Hanja.

=== Toponymy ===
Due to standardization efforts during the Goryeo and Joseon eras, native Korean placenames were converted to Hanja, and most names used today are Hanja-based. The most notable exception is the name of the capital, Seoul, a native Korean word meaning 'capital' with no direct Hanja conversion; the Hanja gyeong (경; 京; lit. ''capital'') is sometimes used as a back-rendering. For example, disyllabic names of railway lines, freeways, and provinces are often formed by taking one character from each of the two locales' names; thus,

- The Gyeongbu (경부; 京釜) corridor connects Seoul (gyeong, 京) and Busan (bu, 釜);
- The Gyeongin (경인; 京仁) corridor connects Seoul and Incheon (in, 仁);
- The former Jeolla (전라; 全羅) Province took its name from the first characters in the city names Jeonju (전주; 全州) and Naju (나주; 羅州) (Naju is originally Raju, but the initial "r/l" sound in South Korean is simplified to "n").

Most atlases of Korea today are published in two versions: one in Hangul (sometimes with some English as well), and one in Hanja. Subway and railway station signs give the station's name in Hangul, Hanja, and English, both to assist visitors (including Chinese or Japanese who may rely on the Hanja spellings) and to disambiguate the name.

=== Academia ===
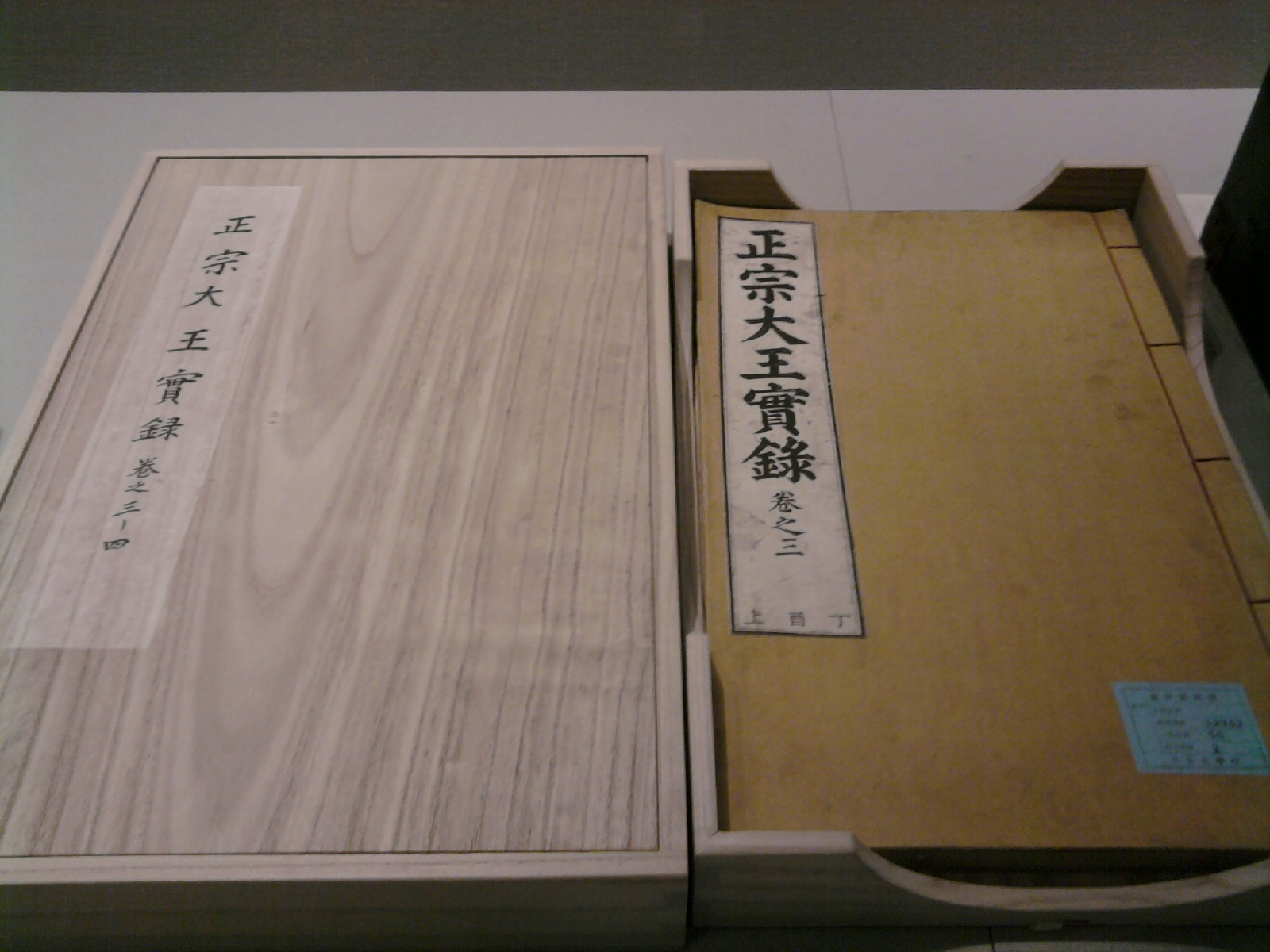
The Veritable Records of the Joseon Dynasty, an annual record of the Joseon dynasty throughout its entire history, was written in Classical Chinese.

Hanja are still required for certain disciplines in academia, such as Oriental Studies and other disciplines studying Chinese, Japanese or historic Korean literature and culture, since the vast majority of primary source text material are written in Hanzi, Kanji or Hanja.

=== Art and culture ===
For the traditional creative arts such as calligraphy and painting, a knowledge of Hanja is needed to write and understand the various scripts and inscriptions, as is the same in China and Japan. Many old songs and poems are written and based on Hanja characters.

On 9 September 2003, the celebration for the 55th anniversary of North Korea featured a float decorated with the scenario for welcoming Kim Il Sung, which included a banner with Kim Il Sung's name written in Hanja.

=== Popular usage ===
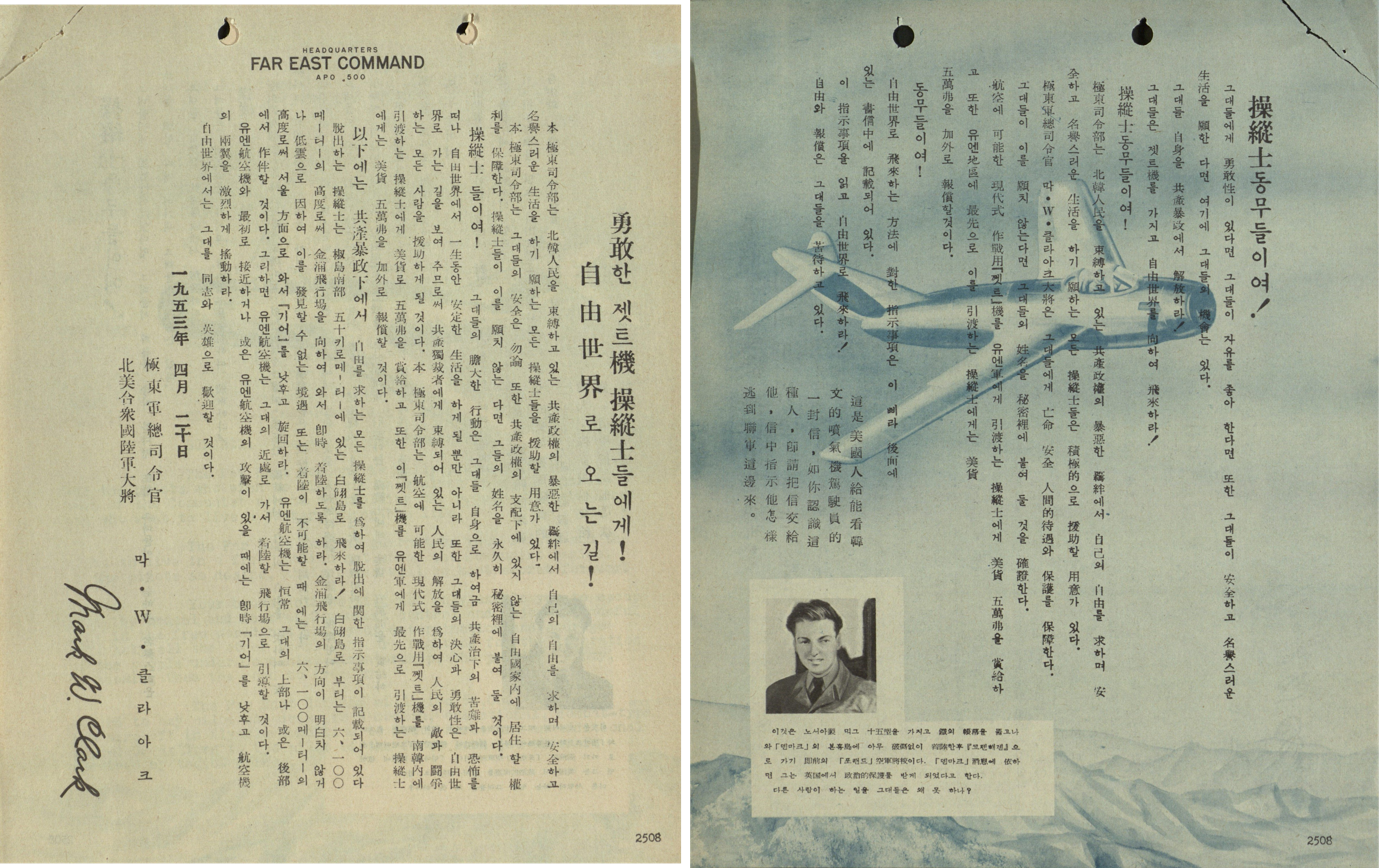
This Korean War propaganda leaflet created by the US Army as part of Operation Moolah uses Hangul–Hanja mixed script.

Opinion surveys in South Korea regarding the issue of Hanja use have had mixed responses in the past. Hanja terms are also expressed through Hangul, the standard script in the Korean language. Hanja use within general Korean literature has declined since the 1980s because formal Hanja education in South Korea does not begin until the seventh year of schooling, due to changes in government policy during the time.

In 1956, one study found mixed-script Korean text (in which Sino-Korean nouns are written using Hanja, and other words using Hangul) were read faster than texts written purely in Hangul; however, by 1977, the situation had reversed. In 1988, 65% of one sample of people without a college education "evinced no reading comprehension of any but the most common hanja" when reading mixed-script passages.

== Gukja ==
A small number of characters were invented by the Koreans themselves. These characters are called gukja (국자; 國字; lit. ''national characters''). Most of them are for proper names (place-names and people's names) but some refer to Korean-specific concepts and materials. They include 畓 (답; dap; 'paddy field'), 欌 (장; jang, 'wardrobe'), 乭 (돌; Dol, a character only used in given names), 㸴 (소; So, a rare surname from Seongju), and 怾 (기; Gi, an old name referring to Kumgangsan).

Further examples include 巭 (부 bu), 頉 (탈 tal), 䭏 (편 pyeon), 哛 (뿐 ppun), and 椧 (명 myeong). See Korean gukja characters at Wiktionary for more examples.

Compared to the parallel development in Japan of kokuji (国字), of which there are hundreds, many are rarely used. These were often developed for native Japanese plants and animals.

=== Yakja ===
Some Hanja characters have simplified forms (약자; 略字; yakja) that can be seen in casual use. An example is, which is a cursive form of 無 (meaning 'nothing').

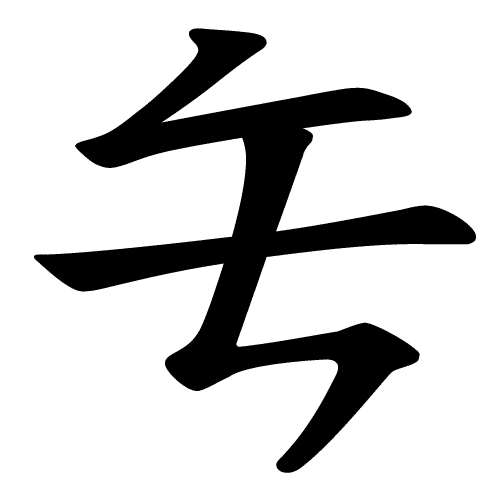
Yakja (약자, 略字) simplification of 無

== Pronunciation ==
Each Hanja character is pronounced as a single syllable, corresponding to a single composite character in Hangul. The pronunciation of Hanja in Korean is by no means identical to the way they are pronounced in modern Chinese, particularly Mandarin, although some Chinese dialects and Korean share similar pronunciations for some characters. For example, 印刷 "print" is yìnshuā in Mandarin Chinese and inswae (인쇄) in Korean, but it is pronounced inseh in Shanghainese (a Wu Chinese dialect).

One difference is the loss of tone from standard Korean while most Chinese dialects retain tone. In other aspects, the pronunciation of Hanja is more conservative than most northern and central Chinese dialects, for example in the retention of labial consonant codas in characters with labial consonant onsets, such as the characters 法 (법 beop) and 凡 (범 beom); labial codas existed in Middle Chinese but do not survive intact in most northern and central Chinese varieties today, and even in many southern Chinese varieties that still retain labial codas, including Cantonese and Hokkien, labial codas in characters with labial onsets are replaced by their dental counterparts.

Due to divergence in pronunciation since the time of borrowing, sometimes the pronunciation of a Hanja and its corresponding hanzi may differ considerably. For example, 女 ('woman') is nǚ in Mandarin Chinese and nyeo (녀) in Korean. However, in most modern Korean dialects (especially South Korean ones), 女 is pronounced as yeo (여) when used in an initial position, due to a systematic elision of initial n when followed by y or i. Additionally, sometimes a Hanja-derived word will have altered pronunciation of a character to reflect Korean pronunciation shifts, for example, mogwa 모과 木瓜 'quince' from mokgwa 목과, and moran 모란 牡丹 'Paeonia suffruticosa' from modan 모단.

There is some pronunciation correspondence between the onset, rhyme, and coda between Cantonese and Korean.

When learning how to write Hanja, students are taught to memorize the native Korean pronunciation of the Hanja's meaning and the Sino-Korean pronunciations (the pronunciation based on the Chinese pronunciation of the characters) for each Hanja respectively so that students know what the syllable and meaning is for a particular Hanja. For example, the name for the Hanja 水 is 물 수 (mul-su) in which 물 (mul) is the native Korean pronunciation for 'water', while 수 (su) is the Sino-Korean pronunciation of the character. The naming of Hanja is similar to if water, horse and gold were named "water-aqua", "horse-equus", or "gold-aurum" based on a hybridization of both the English and the Latin names. Other examples include 사람 인 (saram-in) for 人 'person/people', 클 대 (keul-dae) for 大 'big/large/great', 작을 소 (jageul-so) for 小 'small/little', 아래 하 (arae-ha) for 下 'underneath/below/low', 아비 부 (abi-bu) for 父 'father', and 나라이름 한 (naraireum-han) for 韓 'Han/Korea'.

== See also ==
- Chinese characters
- Chinese influence on Korean culture
- Chinese-language literature of Korea
- East Asian cultural sphere
- Chữ Hán - Chinese characters used for writing Vietnamese
- Kanji – Chinese characters used for writing Japanese (Japanese equivalent of Hanja)
- McCune–Reischauer
- Korean mixed script
- New Korean Orthography
- Revised Romanization of Korean
- Yale romanization of Korean
