= Society of Korean Poets Award =

South Korean poetry award

- Awarded for: Poetry
- Country: South Korea
- First award: 1957
- Website: website

- Korean name
- Hangul: 한국시인협회상
- Hanja: 韓國詩人協會賞
- Revised Romanization: Hanguk Siin Hyeophoesang
- McCune–Reischauer: Han'guk Siin Hyŏphoesang

The Society of Korean Poets Award (Korean: 한국시인협회상) is the oldest prize in Korean literature. The Society of Korean Poets reviews the annual collection of poems published and selects winners annually. The winner was named Kim Soo-young in the first year (1957), and Moon Hyo-chi was chosen by 2017. Since 2005, the Society of Korean Poets has given additional awards to young poets.

== Winners ==
Year	Poet	Work
1957	Kim Soo-young	生活, 동백, 폭포, 병풍, 눈
1958	Kim Chunsu	雨季, 부다페스트에서의 소녀의 죽음, 꽃 ,꽃을 위한 序詩, 소
1959	Jeon Bong-geon	꽃.천상의 악기.표범, 고전적인 속삭임 속의 III.IV.VI.VIII
1972	Jeong Han-mo	序章, 밤의 水路, 나비의 여행, 그저 댓 間쯤, 睡眠의 숲 누비는
1972	Huh Young-ja	감, 봄, 白磁 , 겨울햇볕, 긴 봄날
1973	Kim Kwang-lim	풍경, 갈등, 0, 壬子, 乞人
1974	Cho Byung-hwa	먼 외국에 떠날 때마다, 한번은 절에서, 1962 음력 6월3일, 그저 눈물이, 우린 서로 주소도 모르리
1975	Kim Nam-jo	사랑 草書 1.6.7.11.15.16.23.32.37.38.40.43.47.51.54.63.78.83.94.95
1975	Hong Yun-suk	他關의 햇살(1.麗日 2,가을.도시.入口에 3.내가 사는 마을), 情非, 당신은 오늘
1976	Park Jaesam	어떤 歸路, 엿장수의 가위소리, 그 기러기 마음을 나는 안다, 아기 발바닥에 이마 대고, 잠 못 드는 밤에
1977	Lee Hyeonggi	랑겔한스섬의 가문 날의 꿈, 폭포, 奇蹟, 사랑歌, 손가락
1977	Lee Yu-gyeong	보리, 嚴冬의 강물, 柏山소식, 明禮에서, 守山누나
1978	Kim Jong-sam	북치는 소, 民間人, 나의 本籍, 돌각담, 詩人學校
1979	Sung Chan-gyeong	나사1, 나사2, 나사3, 나사4, 나사5
1980	Chyung Jinkyu	오세요, 오세요, 집, 들판의 비인 집이로다, 峰雪, 곳곳에 가을이 당도하였으매
1981	Kim Yo-seob	이경희
1982	Kim Young-tae	여울묵 비오리
1982	Park Je-chun	律
1983	Gang Woo-sik	파도조
1983	Oh Sae-Young	가장 어두운 날 저녁에,
1984	Kim Yeo-jeong	어린 신에게
1984	Lee Tan	대장간 앞을 지나며
1985	Bak Ui-sang	비위는 저의 길을 가로막는다
1985	Cho Chang-hwan	나자로 마을의 새벽
1986	Gam Tae-jun	종로별곡
1986	Kim Cho-Hye	사랑굿
1987	Lee Seung-hoon	당신의 방
1988	Cho Jung-kwon	하늘이불
1989	Jang Ho	동경 까마귀
1990	Yi Seong-seon	새벽 꽃향기
1991	Bak Hui-jin	북한산 진달래
1992	Bak Seong-nyong	동백꽃
1993	Kim Hyeong-yeong	기다림이 끝나는 날에도
1994	Sin Jung-sin	바이칼호에 와서
1995	Kim Jong-hae	별똥별
1996	Yi Geon-cheong	코뿔소를 찾아서
1997	Beom Dae-sun	아름다운 가난
1998	Bak Sang-cheon	5679는 나를 불안하게 한다
1999	Noh Yang-nim	후투티가 오지 않는 섬
2000	Heo Man-ha	비는 수직으로 서서 죽는다
2001	Yi Suik	눈부신 마음으로 사랑했던
2002	Hong Sin-seon	자화상을 위하여
2003	Oh Takbeon	벙어리장갑
2004	Shin Dalja	이제야 너희를 만났다
2005	Choe Chang-gyun	백 자작나무 숲에 살자
2006	Sin Hyeon-jeong	자전거 도둑
2007	Han yeong-ok	아득한 얼굴
2008	Won Gusik	마돈나를 위하여
2009	Na Tae-joo	눈부신 속살
2010	Gang In-han	입술
2011	Heoh Hyeong-man	그늘이라는 말
2012	Yoo An-jin	둥근 세모꼴
2013	Kim Hu-ran	새벽, 창을 열다
2014	Lee Geunbae	추사를 훔치다
2015	Lee Myeong-soo	바람코지에 두고 간다
2016	Choi Moon-ja	파의 목소리
2017	Moon Hyo-chi	추사를 훔치다
