= Jeon Bonggeon =

South Korean poet

Jeon Bonggeon (Korean: 전봉건; 1928–1988) was a Korean poet. Along with Pak In-hwan, Kim Su-yeong and Kim Jongsam, he represents the post-war modernist movement.

== Biography ==
Jeon Bonggeon was born in 1928 in Anju, South Pyeongan Province. He became interested in literature after his brother Jeon Bongrae recommended that he read The Sorrows of Young Werther (German: Die Leiden des Jungen Werthers) when he was a middle school student.

Bonggeon said that the writers who impressed him the most were Rilke and Baudelaire. He wanted to be a novelist, but because of the illness he suffered from in his early teens, he became enervated and began to write poems instead. As he was taught in Japanese during the colonial period, he had difficulty writing in Korean right after Korea became independent. He debuted in 1950 through Munye (문예 Literature) with the help of Seo Jeong-ju and Kim Yeong-rang. When the Korean War broke out, he joined the military in December and was discharged after he was injured during the battle on the Middle East front in 1951. After the discharge, he started writing poems in Daegu. While he helped Hwang Hunheon with arranging records at the famous classical music hall, "Renaissance," he got acquainted with literary people. After the Korean War was over in 1953, he returned to Seoul.

He participated in establishing the Society of Korean Poets in 1957 and he edited and published the first issue of a magazine, Hyeondaesi (현대시 Modern Poetry). Along with Kim Kwang-lim and Kim Jongsam, he published a multi-authored poetry collection, titled, Jeonjaengkwa eumakkwa heemangkwa (전쟁과 음악과 희망과 With War, With Music, and With Hope) in 1957.

Kim Kwangrim, Kim Jongsam and Bonggeon wrote "With the War," "With Music," and "With Hope" respectively. In 1959, his first collection, Sarangeul wihan doipuli (사랑을 위한 되풀이 Repetition for Love) was published. In 1962, he joined a literary coterie, Hyeondaisi, and edited its magazine. He served as a chief editor for Munhakchunchu (문학춘추 Literature Spring and Autumn), founded in 1964. In addition, he started to write a radio play script and a historical play, Kkotsora (꽃소라 Flower Horned Turban), which was published in 1964. He launched a magazine, Hyondaesihak (현대시학 Modern Poetics) in 1969, and served as a chief editor until he died. He suffered from his chronic illness, diabetes, which got worse in 1987 and he died on June 13, 1988.

In October, 2015, the Modern Poetics established the Jeon Bonggeon Literary Award.

== Writing ==
=== Poetic language ===
His poems display vivid images and dynamic imagination which were rare in poetry in the 1950s. With his distinguished sense of language, he got nicknames such as a "language technician" or "language stylist." His extraordinary sense of language was associated with how he organized an image. One of his representative works is "Piano (피아노 Piano)" where music is transformed through the words like "fresh fish" or "knife blade" into a wide variety of senses.

=== War poetry in the 1950s ===
His poetry in the 1950s depicts the inhumane irrationality of the war and the desire for peace. The poems written based on the war do not show either an anti-communist ideology or superficial humanism. Instead of exaggerating cruelty, his poems describe human beings that become objects or convey determination to heal the wounds of the war.

=== Long poems and serial poetry in the 1960s ===
His poems released in the 1960s describe the inner world through surrealistic representations. Both Chunghayngyeonga (춘향연가 Chunhyang's Love Poem), a long poem published in 1967, and Sokui bada (속의 바다 The Ocean of the Inside), serial poetry, published in 1970, express a fantastically surreal atmosphere. Chunhyang's Love Poem borrows the situation of her in jail from the classic, The Tale of Chunhyang. This poem highlights erotic love saying that love is so powerful that it can overcome the irrationality of reality.

He continues to explore the power of Eros in The Ocean of the Inside where opposite themes are repeated such as male and female; fertility and sterility; and life and death. There is a conflict between a mythical and prototypical world and a sterile real world and the narrator dreams of the mythical world.

=== Piri (피리 Pipe; 1979) ===
Awarded the Korean Literary Award, Pipe well displays Bonggeon's characteristics of pursuing the spirituality and purity of fairy tales in the 1970s. His serial poetry, "Makaroni Westeon (마카로니 웨스턴 Macaroni Western)" describes rampant materialistic values and impoverished spiritual life that prevailed throughout the 1970s. With the repetitive image of death, it is as if life gives way to death. However, for him, it is the task of a poet to show resilient life, and in that way, Pipe represents hope, life and birth.

=== Poems in the 1980s ===
During the 1980s, Bonggeon pursued harmonious communication between self and the world. Another serial poetry, Dol (돌 Stones), starting to be released in 1981, was written based on his own experiences of collecting viewing stones around the Namhangang River. A stone in the poem "Stones" (1984) is not just a passive object but a living thing trying to express itself.

After the mid-1980s, he published a series of poems titled "6.25," based on the subject of the Korean War, but he could not finish it. This poetry deals with the matter of the North and the South Korea with the political ideology put aside.

=== Revision ===
Bonggeon has never written any poem at one sitting. For him, revision was pleasure and he repeated revision. He revised his own work that had been published in a literary magazine to publish it in a separate form and even revised a poem in a collection to republish it in an anthology. He also revised his review on a magazine to publish it in a book form.

=== Dispute with Kim Suyeong ===
In February, through "Sagiron (사기론 Fraud)" in Sedae (세대, Generation), Bonggeon criticized a review Kim Suyeong wrote in Sasanggye (사상계 The World of Thoughts) in December 1964. Bonggeon said that he gave credit for Kim but his theory was not applicable to his own poems and the poems he advocated were nonsense. To respond, Kim explained himself through "Munmaekeul moreuneun siindeul (문맥을 모르는 시인들 Poets Who Don't Know Context)" in the March issue of Sedae. After that, by publishing "Chamyeoraneungeot (참여라는 것 What It Means To Participate)" in Hyeondaemunhak (현대문학 Modern Literature) in November 1966, Bonggeon pointed out the contradictions of the kind of poetry that deals with socio-political matters.

== Works ==
=== Complete works ===
- 《전봉건 시전집》, 문학동네. 2008 / Jeonbonggeon sijeonjip (Jeon Bonggeon Poetry Collection), Munhakdongne, 2008.

=== Poetry collections ===
- 《사랑을 위한 되풀이》, 춘조사, 1959 / Sarangeul wihan doipuli (Repetition for Love), Chunjosa, 1959.
- 《춘향연가》, 성문각, 1967 / Chunhyangyeonka (Chunhyang's Love Poem), Seongmungak, 1967.
- 《속의 바다》, 문원사, 1970 / Sokui bada (The Ocean of the Inside), Munwonsa, 1970.
- 《피리》, 문학예술가, 1979 / Piri (Pipe), Munhakyesulga, 1979.
- 《꿈속의 뼈》, 근역서제, 1980 (시선집) / Kkumsokui bbye (Bone in Dream), Keunyeoksoeje, 1980 (Anthology).
- 《북의 고향》, 명지사, 1982 / Bukui kohyang (Hometown in North), Myeongjisa, 1982.
- 《새들에게》, 고려원, 1983 (시선집) / Saedeulege (To Birds), Koryowon, 1983 (Anthology).
- 《돌》, 현대문학사, 1984 / Dol (Stones), Hyeondainumhaksa, 1984.
- 《전봉건 시선》, 탐구당 1985 (시선집) / Jeonbonggeon siseon (Selected Poems of Jeon Bonggeon), Tamgudang, 1985 (Anthology).
- 《사랑을 위한 되풀이》, 혜진서관, 1985 (시선집) / Sarangeul wihan doipuli (Repetition for Love), Hyejinseokwan, 1985 (Anthology).
- 《트럼펫 천사》, 어문각, 1986 (시선집) / Trumpet cheonsa (Trumpet Angel), Eomungak, 1986 (Anthology).
- 《아지랭이 그리고 아픔》, 혜원출판사 1987 (시선집) / Ajirangi geurigo apeum (Haze and Pain), Heowon, 1987 (Anthology).
- 《기다리기》, 문학사상사, 1987 (시선집) / Gidarigi (Waiting), Munhaksasangsa, 1987 (Anthology).
- 《백 개의 태양》 깊은샘, 2008 (시선집) / Baek gaeui taeyang (A Hundred of the Suns), Kipeunsaem, 2008 (Anthology).
- 《전봉건문학선: 고독한 안개/꽃소라/모래와 산소/무영탑》, 문학선, 2013 (시선집) / Jeonbonggeonmunhakseon: godokhan angae/kkotsora/moraewa sanso/muyeongtap (Selected Literature: Lonely Fog/Flower Horned Turban/Sand and Oxygen/Muyeong Tower), Munhakseon, 2013 (Anthology).

=== Multi-authored poetry collections ===
- 김광림, 김종삼, 전봉건, 《전쟁과 음악과 희망과》, 자유세계사, 1957 / Kim Kwangrim, Kim Jongsam, Jeon Bonggeon. Jeonjaengkwa eumakkwa himangkwa (With War, With Music, and With Hope), Jayusegyesa, 1957.

=== Collections of poetics ===
- 《시를 찾아서》, 청운출판사, 1961 / Sireul chajaseo (In Pursuit of Poetry), Choengun, 1961.
- 《전봉건시론선: 詩를 찾아서/체험적 시론과 단상들/시 월평과 시론, 시집 서문과 후기, 편지글·기타/생애 및 작품연보》, 문학선, 2015 / Jeonbonggeonsironseon: sireulchajaseo/cheheomjeok sironkwa dansangdeul/si wolpyeongkwa siron, sijip seomunkwa hugi, pyeonjigeul·gita/saengae mit jakpumyeonbo (Selected Reviews of Jeon Bonggeon: In Pursuit of Poetry / Empirical Poetics and Thoughts / Monthly Poetry Reviews and Poetry Theories, Poetry Collections, Foreword and Afterword, Letters and Others/Bibliography and Chronological Listing of Author's Works), Munhakseon, 2015

=== Co-authored ===
- 《전봉건, 이승훈 대담시론》, 문학 선, 2011 / Jeonbonggeon, leeseunghun daedamsiron (Talks Between Jeon Bonggeon and Lee Seunghun on Poetics), Munhak seon, 2011

=== Works in translation ===
- 《한국문학특집호 20세기 한국 시》, Manoa, 2016 / The Colors of Dawn: Twentieth-Century Korean Poetry, Univ of Hawaii Press, 2016. ISBN 9780824866228.
- Hundert Sonnen, Peperkorn, 2007 / 《백개의 태양》, Wha Seon Roske-Cho 역, 깊은 샘, 2008. ISBN 9783929181791.

== Awards ==
- 1959, The 3rd Society of Korean Poets Award
- 1980, Korean Literature Award (Pipe)
- 1984, Korean Culture and Art Award
