= Honorary poets =

Part of the Society of Korean Poets

Honorary Poets are called 'Myung-ye Si-in' in Korea and are the honorary members of the Society of Korean Poets. Originally, the members of the Society of Korean Poets are subject to poets. However, if a person approves and respects the purpose of the association and contributes greatly to the advancement of Korean poet literature, he serves as an honorary member of the Society of Korean Poets. An Honorary Poets shall decide through the Board of Directors under the Society's Articles of Association.

The first honorary award was on November 1, 1987. It marks the first day of Poetry Day in Korea. Moreover, it is also the third day that 'Hurrah for the Poets', which became the beginning of the popular 'Si-nangsong'(poetry recitation).

Kim Sung-woo was chosen as the first Honorary Poet to earn recognition for his achievement that launched poetry recitation movement through 'Hurrah for the Poets'. Since then, Kim Soo-nam, Kim Yang-dong, Park Sung-hoon and Shin Chang-jae have been honored. There are only five Honorary Poets devoted by the Society of Korean Poets so far.

The 'Hurrah for the Poets' was a large-scale poetry recitation event in Korea. The first 'Hurrah for the Poets' was hosted by the 'Weekly Korea' in 1967 at the Sejong Center in Seoul. The event was held to mark the 60th anniversary of Korea's modern poetry. There were over 3,000 audience members and 32 poet members. The second poet was held in the Korea Literary & Arts Center in 1986 as the host of the 'Weekly Korea'. The event was broadcast on South Korean television, and it was the first time that the poetry recitation contest was broadcast. The third 'Hurrah for the Poets' was celebrated in 1987 for 80th anniversary of Korea's modern poetry, as mentioned earlier. The fourth anniversary was held to mark the 100th anniversary of Korea's modern poetry in 2008 as the host of the JEI Corporation and KBS.

== List of Honorary Poets ==
Year	Name	Profile
1987	Kim Sung-woo	The former managing editor of Hankook Ilbo
1987	Kim Soo-nam	The former president of Kids Hankook Ilbo
1987	Kim Yang-dong	Calligrapher
2007	Sung-hoon Park	Chairman of JEI Group
2017	Shin Chang-jae	Chairman of Kyobo Life

== See also ==
- Si-nangsong
- Society of Korean Poets
- Poetry reading
- World Poetry Day
