= Kim Sung-woo =

South Korean poet (born 1934)

- Born: 1934 (age 91–92); Tongyeong, Keishōnan-dō, Korea, Empire of Japan
- Citizenship: South Korean
- Writing career
- Language: Korean

- Korean name
- Hangul: 김성우
- Hanja: 金聖佑
- RR: Gim Seongu
- MR: Kim Sŏngu

Kim Sung-woo (Korean: 김성우; born 1934) is honorary poet and journalist of South Korea.

He was born in Yokjido, Tongyeong, Keishōnan-dō, Korea, Empire of Japan in 1934. He graduated from Seoul National University majoring in politics. He joined the Hankook Ilbo and served as a Paris correspondent, Managing editor and standing advisor. He is a journalist who has served in newspapers for 44 years.

He became the Korea's first Honorary Poet (Society of Korean Poets) for popularizing poetry recitation movements. He is also South Korea's only Honorary Actor (National Theater Association of Korea Inc.). Currently, he is serving as a permanent executive director of JEI Culture Foundation.

== Awards ==
- 1991 Culture Prize in Seoul
- 1992 Korean Culture & Arts Awards
- 1996 Order of Merit for France
- 1997 Samsung Press Awards
- 2010 Tongyeong Culture Awards
- 2016 The Bogwan Order of Culture Merit from the Korean Ministry of Culture and Tourism

== Works list ==
- 1991 Into the Forest of Birch(백화나무 숲으로)
- 1994 The age of culture(문화의 시대)
- 1997 The Literary Travels Around the World(세계의 문학기행)
- 1997 The Music Travels Around the World(세계의 음악기행)
- 2000 Intellect travels of Paris(파리 지성기행)
- 2007 Life is a question(인생은 물음이다)
- 2011 A returning ship(돌아가는 배)
- 2018 Beyond the horizon(수평선 너머에서)

== See also ==
- Si-nangsong
- Korean literature
- List of Korean-language poets
