= Kim Kyungrin =

South Korean poet (1918–2006)

- 김경린
- Born: 1918
- Died: 2006 (aged 87–88)

Kim Kyungrin (Korean: 김경린; 1918-2006) was a South Korean poet. In a changing world, he pursued poetry that embodied modern gazes and expressions. Along with Park In-hwan and Lee Bong-rae, Kim led the modern poetry movement in South Korea in the 1950s. When postmodernism became a global trend in the 1980s, he actively accepted and incorporated concrete poetry, projective verse, and minimalism in his poetry and poetics.

== Life ==
Kim Kyungrin was born in Jongseong, North Hamgyeong Province, in 1918. He first made his poetic debut in 1939 with the publication of poems “Chachang” (차창 Train Window), “Hwaan” (화안 An Eye for Paintings), and “Kkongcho” (꽁초 Cigarette Stub), but began actively writing after his study abroad in Japan. After he graduated from Gyeongseong Electric Technical High School (경성전기공업학교), he left for Japan and graduated from the Engineering School at Waseda University with a major in civil engineering in 1942. From 1939 to March 1940, Kim was active in the literary coterie magazine titled Maek hugi (맥(脈) 후기). During his time in Japan, he participated in modernism coteries VOU and Singisul (신기술), publishing his works in Singisul (신기술), Sinsiron (신시론), and Nabinhyeon (납인형 Lead Doll) and writing about modernist poetics. Through VOU, he also communicated with English, American, and French poetical circles, led by Ezra Pound, James Joyce, Pablo Picasso, and William Carlos Williams. After Korea’s liberation from the Japanese rule, Kim returned to Korea and participated in modernist coteries, such as Sinsiron (신시론) in 1948, Hubangi (후반기) in 1950, and afterward DIAL. In 1955, he enrolled in and completed a short-term program at a New York State university, and he joined a modern American poetry society at Ezra Pound’s recommendation. Starting in the 1960s, he stopped writing and served as the head of the Waterworks Division for the Seoul Metropolitan Government, head of Urban Planning Division in the Civil Engineering Bureau of the Ministry of the Interior, director of a training school for public servants in construction, director of construction at the Bureau of Yeongnam National Construction, and a board member for the Industrial Base Development Company. But in the 1980s, he picked up his pen again.

The first poetry collection Kim published upon his return to Korea is Saeroun dosiwa simindeurui hapchang (새로운 도시와 시민들의 합창 A New City and the Chorus of People) (1949), along with other members of Sinsiron, including Park In-hwan, Im Ho-gwon, Kim Soo-young, and Yang Byeongsik. From his first book of poetry, he emphasized the need for modernism in the Korean poetry scene. In Hyeondaeui ondo (현대의 온도 Temperature of Modern Times) (1957), published with the members of DIAL—Kim Won-tae, Kim Jeong-ok, Kim Cha-yeong, Kim Ho, Park Taejin, Lee Cheol-beom, and Lee Hwal—Kim radically demonstrated his urban sensibility and modern consciousness in postwar Korea. Afterward, following the global trend of minimalism, he attempted writing in new poetic forms of “poetic fiction” (시소설) and “conversational poetry” (대화시), which culminated in the publication of Hwayoirimyeon tteugeowojineun geu saram (화요일이면 뜨거워지는 그 사람 The Person Who Grows Hot on Tuesdays) (1994). In this book, Kim argued that Korean poetry should “take a step forward from Korean traditions toward global traditions,” which showed his consistent idea of keeping in line with a modernist view and the global trend. He also published an essay book about postmodernism written in the esquisse format titled Argi swiun poseuteumoderonijeumgwa geu iyagi (알기 쉬운 포스트모더니즘과 그 이야기 An Easy Take on Postmodernism and Its Story) (1994). His posthumous collection of poems Heureuneun hyeolmaekgwado gachi (흐르는 혈맥과도 같이 Like a Flowing Vein) was published in 2018.

In 1957, Kim was active as the first assistant administrator of the Society of Korean Poets. In 1983, he developed modernist theories as a member of the American Modern Poetry Association and received the Korean Critics Society Literary Award (평론가협회문학상) in 1986. In the same year, he served as the president of the New Korean Poetry Society (한국신시학회). He received the Korean Art Critics Council’s Best Artist in Literature Award in 1994 and the Sanghwa Poet’s Award in 1988.

== Writing ==
Kim Kyungrin is a poet who participated in literary coteries Sinsiron and Hubangi (후반기), which were at the forefront and the center of Korean modernist poetry. He saw poetry as an “undeniable fact that is developing toward a single historical ‘course’” and believed that “true modern poetry should be found in intellectual view of the world based on tradition and reality in the global simultaneity.” His poetic orientation remains consistent throughout the early literary modernism movement to the literary postmodernism movement.

=== Early Literary Modernism Movement ===
In Saeroun dosiwa simindeurui hapchang, which contains poems by other members of Sinsiron, including Park In-hwan, Im Ho-gwon, Kim Soo-young, and Yang Byeongsik in 1949, Kim published a set of poems, “Pajangcheoreom” (파장처럼 Like Ripples), “Mugeoun jichugeul” (무거운 지축을 The Heavy Axis of the Earth), “Nabukkineun gyejeol” (나부끼는 계절 Fluttering Season), “Seonhoehaneun gaeul” (선회하는 가을 Circling Autumn), and “Bitnaneun gwangseoni ol geoseul” (빛나는 광선이 올 것을 A Bright Beam of Light Will Come) under the heading “Maehogui yeondae” (매혹의 연대 Solidarity of Allurement). In these poems, Kim provides a conceptual depiction of the urban civilization, which is not limited to the contemporary reality in Korea but expanded to the global level. Words that appear repeatedly in the poems, such as “speed,” “time,” “trend,” “a beam of light,” and “international train” are in line with Kim’s poetic orientation of emphasizing a sense of urban life while opposing traditional lyricism. Furthermore, this pattern is in line with the common sensibility and criticism of civilization seen in the works of Park In-hwan and Kim Soo-young, who were also members of Sinsiron.

After his participation in Hubangi, Kim published a poetry anthology titled Hyeondaeui ondo with the members of DIAL, Kim Won-tae, Kim Jeong-ok, Kim Cha-yeong, Kim Ho, Park Taejin, Lee Cheol-beom, and Lee Hwal in 1957. His poems in the anthology were “Noesepo sogui sasildeul” (뇌세포 속의 사실들 Truths in the Brain Cells), “Taeyangi jikgageuro tteoreojineun Seoul” (태양이 직각으로 떨어지는 서울 Seoul Where the Sun Drops at a Right Angle), “Heureuneun gamseongeul wihayeo” (흐르는 감성을 위하여 For the Flowing Sensibility) “Bunsildoen jumareul wihayeo” (분실된 주말을 위하여 For the Lost Weekend), and “Gukjeyeolchaneun tajagicheoreom” (국제열차는 타자기처럼 An International Train Like A Typewriter). He was praised as a poet who used the deformation technique to depict a poet’s daily experiences through multilateral views on the real civilization and was considered a “poet who thoroughly experienced every stage of modernism.” During this early literature modernism movement, Kim illustrated optimistic prospects of modernity, unlike Park In-hwan, Kim Kyudong, and other member of Hubangi, who tended to criticize and resist against the crises and contradictions arising from the process of modernization.

=== Literary Postmodernism Movement ===
In Taeyangi jikgageuro tteoreojineun Seoul, which was published in 1985, Kim mentioned the emergence of postmodernism and wrote poems using terms from geometry and engineering. In his 1987 poetry collection Seoureun yasaengmacheoreom (서울은 야생마처럼 Seoul, Like a Wild Horse), Kim attempted to write projective verse, which involves the intent to deliver the energy gained from writing poetry to the readers. In 1988, he pursued a new type of poetry by focusing on the conversational quality of concrete poetry and the factual quality of minimalism in Geu naeiredo dangsineun Seourui bulsae (그 내일에도 당신은 서울의 불새 In That Tomorrow You Are the Firebird of Seoul). In Hwayoirimyeon tteugeowojineun geu saram, published in 1994, he proposed new poetry forms “poetic fiction,” which incorporated fictional elements in poetry and “conversational poetry,” which aimed to get away from the poetic abstruseness of modern poetry.

== Works ==
=== 1. Poetry Collections ===
《태양이 직각으로 떨어지는 서울》, 청담문화사, 1985 / Taeyangi jikgageuro tteoreojineun Seoul (Seoul Where the Sun Drops at a Right Angle), Cheongdammunhwasa, 1985.

《서울은 야생마처럼》, 문학사상사, 1987 / Seoureun yasaengmacheoreom (Seoul, Like a Wild Horse), Literature & Thought, 1987.

《그 내일에도 당신은 서울의 불새》, 경운, 1988 / Geu naeiredo dangsineun Seourui bulsae (In That Tomorrow You Are the Firebird of Seoul), Gyeongun, 1988.

《화요일이면 뜨거워지는 그 사람》, 문학사상사, 1994 / Hwayoirimyeon tteugeoowojineun geu saram (The Person Who Grows Hot on Tuesdays), Literature & Thought, 1994.

《흐르는 혈맥과도 같이》, 월간문학, 2018 / Heureuneun hyeolmaekgwado gachi (Like a Flowing Vein), Monthly Literature Wolganmunhak, 2018.

=== 2. Essay Collection ===
《알기 쉬운 포스트모더니즘과 그 이야기》, 앞선책, 1994 / Argi swiun poseuteumoderonijeumgwa geu iyagi (An Easy Take on Postmodernism and Its Story), Apseonchaek, 1994.

=== 3. Joint Poetry Collections ===
《새로운 도시와 시민들의 합창》, 청담문화사, 1949 / Saeroun dosiwa simindeurui hapchang (A New City and the Chorus of People), Cheongdammunhwasa, 1949.

《현대의 온도》, 도시문화사, 1957 / Hyeondaeui ondo (Temperature of Modern Times), Dosimunhwasa, 1957.

== Awards ==
The 5th Korean Literary Critics Society Literary Award (한국문학평론가협회 문학상) (1986)

The 3rd Sanghwa Poet’s Award (1988)

Korean Art Critics Council’s Best Artist in Literature Award (1994)
