= Park In-hwan =

Park In-hwan may refer to:

- Park In-hwan (author) (1926–1956), South Korean poet and author.
- Park In-hwan (actor) (born 1945), South Korean actor.
