= Jei =

Jei or JEI may refer to:

- Spanish: A colloquial interjection that means "hi", "hey there", or "hey"
- Mokilese: An intransitive verb that means "to paddle" or "to go by boat"
- Jane Castro (born 1982), American entertainer
- Journal of Electronic Imaging
- Yei language, spoken in Papua New Guinea
- Jei, member of South Korean girl group Fiestar
- JEI Corporation, a South Korean educational company
