= Yoonil Auh =

Korean-American educator

James Yoon-il Auh 어윤일
- Born: Seoul, South Korea

- Yoonil Auh
- Hangul: 어윤일
- Hanja: 魚允一
- RR: Eo Yunil
- MR: Ŏ Yunil

Yoon-il Auh is a Korean–American technologist, educator, and public intellectual whose work focuses on online learning systems, digital education infrastructure, and the societal implications of artificial intelligence. He has held academic and executive leadership roles in higher education in both the United States and South Korea, with an emphasis on large-scale public learning platforms, institutional innovation, and technology-mediated education.

== Professional background ==
Yoon-il Auh is a professor in the Department of Computer Information and Communications Engineering at Kyung Hee Cyber University in Seoul, South Korea. His academic work focuses on online learning systems, digital education infrastructure, and the societal implications of artificial intelligence.

Auh has played a leading role in the design and development of large-scale public online learning initiatives. He served as the principal designer of G-MOOC (gseek.kr), a lifelong learning platform developed for the residents of Gyeonggi Province, sponsored by the Office of the Governor of Gyeonggi-do. He is also recognized for his contributions to the conceptual design of MOOC 2.0, an alternative model to first-generation massive open online courses, and South Korea’s Military MOOC (M-MOOC), a national online learning initiative for military education and training.

In addition to his academic work, Auh contributes as a public intellectual on higher education and technology policy. He has published commentary in University World News on topics including artificial intelligence in higher education, digital transformation and academic governance, the evolution of online learning beyond traditional MOOCs, automation and institutional authority, post-pandemic university reform, and global higher education policy.

Yoon-il Auh has held multiple senior executive administrative positions at Kyung Hee Cyber University, the Global Campus of Kyung Hee University. His roles included Vice President of the University and Dean of the School of Integrated IT and Design. Prior to his appointment in Korea, he served as Vice President of the National Labor College of the AFL–CIO in Maryland from 2005 to 2012. He also served as a director at Central Michigan University, where he was responsible for distance and distributed education from 2001 to 2005. Auh served as director of research at the Music for One Foundation (INGO) at the Research Institute for Humanities Performing Arts since 2011. From 2013 ~ 2015, Auh was a visiting professor at Global Education Cooperation Program, Interdisciplinary Studies, College of Education at Seoul National University and served as Vice Chair of the South Korean Ministry of Education's Special Committee of the Future of Korean Education in 2015.

Auh received a Doctor of Education (Ed.D.) in instructional technology from Teachers College, Columbia University. His doctoral dissertation, "Designing and Creating an Interdisciplinary Learning Environment Using Cognitive Flexibility Theory", received the College President's Doctoral Dissertation Award in 2000. Prior to that, Auh received his MA in Cognition, Computing and Education and an Ed.M. in Music Education and Cognition from Columbia University and an MM and B.A from the Juilliard School. He is also an American Council on Education-certified curriculum reviewer.

== Music background ==
In addition to his academic career, Auh has been an active violinist, conductor, composer and author of music books. He received musical training from the Juilliard School under Dorothy DeLay for fourteen years. As a concert violinist, he has performed at American concert venues including Avery Fisher Hall, Alice Tully Hall in the Lincoln Center, and Carnegie Hall, where he gave his New York debut at the age of sixteen. He is also the founder of the International Web Concert Hall (IWCH) competition, which was launched in 1998 and continued until 2012. IWCH was the first of its kind in classical music to hold such events at a global level. The IWCH was reviewed in The New York Times He is actively involved in promoting community development via performing arts education at both a local and global level. At the global level, he has presented on the topics of performing arts education, community development through arts, lifelong learning, and online learning Paraguay apunta a mejorar la educación con ayuda de la tecnología. He is also an author of Harmony Nation Education System sponsored by Kyobo Life and Music for One Foundation. The Harmony Nation program and related activity has been sponsored by KOICA since 2013 and has been utilized for promoting education for development in South Korea, Myanmar, Tanzania, Cambodia, Panama, and Costa Rica. From 2012 to 2015, Auh served as a faculty member in the Global Leaders program at YOA Orchestra of the Americas an organization based in Washington, D.C.
