= Huh Young-ja =

South Korean poet (born 1938)

- Born: August 31, 1938 (age 87); Hamyang, South Korea
- Citizenship: South Korean
- Writing career
- Language: Korean

- Korean name
- Hangul: 허영자
- Hanja: 許英子
- RR: Heo Yeongja
- MR: Hŏ Yŏngja

Huh Young-ja (Korean: 허영자; born 1938) is a Korean female poet. She is called "The Poet of Love and Moderation," embodying Oriental lyricism such as han, love and waiting in a highly condensed beauty. She is regarded as a unique poet who combines traditional and modern sentiments.

== Biography ==
Huh was born on August 31, 1938, in Hamyang, South Gyeongsang Province. She graduated from Gyeonggi Girls' High School and Sookmyung Women's University. She had her childhood during the Korean War and began reading books as a way of overcoming harsh realities. She mainly read classical Korean literature, the collected works of world literature and Korean literature, etc. In 1961, she debuted with Dojeongyeonga (도정연가 Journey Sonata), published in Modern Literature at the recommendation of Park Mok-wol. She worked with Kim Seon-yeong and Kim Hu-ran in 1963 to organize a female poetry coterie Cheongmihoe (Blue Eyebrow Association). She published poetry collections Gaseumen deut nunen deut (가슴엔 듯 눈엔 듯 In My Heart, In My Eyes; 1966), Eoyeoppeumiya eojji kkotppunirya (어여쁨이야 어찌 꽃뿐이랴 Flowers, They Are Not the Only Beauty; 1977), Joyonghan seulpeum (조용한 슬픔 Quiet Sadness; 1990), Eunui mugemankeum (은의 무게만큼 By the Weight of Silver; 2007), Tumyeonge daehayeo oe (투명에 대하여 외 On Transparency and Others; 2017) and others. She also published sijo collection Somyeorui gippeum (소멸의 기쁨 The Joy of Extinction; 2003), essay collections Han songi kkotdo dangsin tteuseuro (한 송이 꽃도 당신 뜻으로 Do as You Please Even on a Flower; 1978) and Areumdaun salmeul hyanghayeo (아름다운 삶을 향하여 Towards a Beautiful Life; 1980) and literary studies Hankuk yeoseongsiui ihaewa gamsang (한국 여성시의 이해와 감상 Understanding and Appreciation of Korean Women's Poetry; 1997).

She served as a secondary school teacher at Gyeseong Girls' High School, a professor of Korean literature at Sungshin Women's University, the standing director of Korean Culture and Arts Foundation, and the chairman of the Society of Korean Poets and the Korean Women's Literature Association. She won the Society of Korean Poets Award in 1972, the Woltan Literary Prize in 1985, the Dongni·Mogwol Literary Prize in 2008, the Heo Nanseolheon Poetry Prize and the Republic of Korea's Okgwan Order of Cultural Merit in 2015.

== Writing ==
She is called "The Poet of Love and Moderation". The nickname derives from the beauty of form achieved through the implications of love and meaning, her works' main subject. The Oriental love song-style lyric poetry that uses the Korean concept of han as the main emotion and delicately depicts separation and longing of the beloved one is the biggest feature of her poetry.

Love in her poetry is not limited to erotic love between men and women, but is manifested in various forms, including parental and filial love and love for religious absolutes. Her poem regards "love" as the greatest value and reveals the multifaceted meaning of "love". Huh's "love" extends beyond the realm of emotion and into reality. Bundan – Sangsacho (분단 – 상사초 Division – Herb of Longing) sings of the sorrow of the national division by comparing it to Sangsacho whose flowers and leaves cannot meet.

Another feature of her poetry, "moderation", is expressed as a form of condensed beauty. The poet herself tried to make it contain the most meaning in as little language as possible. She described the value of acquiring rhythm, implications, polysemy, symbolism through temperance of language in the eight-line Muju (무제 Untitled·I). In Jasu (자수 Embroidery, the process of overcoming heartache and sorrow of losing a loved one by embroidering is described with restrained emotions and the poetic diction "riverside" expresses in a pithy way the state of equilibrium that was finally reached.

=== Diverse religiosity ===
Religiousness in her poems is not confined to a specific religion, but shows various facets such as Buddhism, Christianity, and pantheism. Her poetry Gwaneumbosallim (관음보살님 Avalokitesvara Bodhisattva) is tinged with Buddhism, using incense and kindles. Im (임 Thee) presents the pantheistic worldview in which all is God and Chakan moksu (착한 목수 Good Carpenter) eulogizes Jesus' sacrifice and love. This attitude goes beyond the religious meaning and extends to a saga of men who put the broken selves at the center of the world in her poetry collection Makdalla maria (막달라 마리아 Mary Magdalene; 2017). Multifaceted religiousness in her poems is seen to be attributable to a flexible attitude toward life and multilateral perspectives.

== Works ==
- 《가슴엔 듯 눈엔 듯》, 중앙문화사, 1966 / Gaseumen deut nunen deut (In My Heart, In My Eyes), Joonangmunhwasa, 1966
- 《친전》, 문원사, 1971 / Chinjeon (Personal), Munwonsa, 1971
- 《어여쁨이야 어찌 꽃뿐이랴》, 범문사, 1977 / Eoyeoppeumiya eojji kkotppunirya (Flowers, They Are Not the Only Beauty), Beommunsa, 1977
- 《빈 들판을 걸어가면》, 열음사, 1984 / Bin deulpaneul georeogamyeon (If You Walk Down an Empty Field), Yeoreumsa, 1984
- 《내 작은 사랑은》, 예전사, 1986 / Nae jageun sarangeun (My Little Love), Yejeonsa, 1986
- 《조용한 슬픔》, 문학세계사, 1990 / Joyonghan seulpeum (Quiet Sadness), Munhaksegyesa, 1990
- 《기타를 치는 집시의 노래》, 미래문화사, 1995 / Gitareul chineun jipsiui norae (The Song of Gypsy Who Plays the Guitar), Miraemunhwasa, 1995
- 《목마른 꿈으로써》, 마을, 1997 / Mongmareun kkumeurosseo (Thirsty Dream), Maeul, 1997
- 《무지개를 사랑한 걸 후회하지 말자》, 좋은날, 1998 / Mujigaereul saranghan geol huhoehaji malja (Let's Not Regret Loving the Rainbow), Joeunnal, 1998
- 《은의 무게만큼》, 마을, 2007 / Eunui mugemankeum (By the Weight of Silver), Maeul, 2007
- 《마리아 막달라》, 서정시학, 2017 / Maria makdalla (Mary Magdalene), Seojeongsihak, 2017
- 《투명에 대하여 외》, 황금알, 2017 / Tumyeonge daehayeo oe (On Transparency and Others), Goldegg, 2017

2. Sijo Collection

《소멸의 기쁨》, 문학수첩, 2003 / Somyeorui gippeum (The Joy of Extinction), Moonhak Soochup, 2003

3. Anthology

- 《이별하는 길머리엔》, 문학사상사, 1986 / Ibyeolhaneun gilmeorien (On the Verge of Breaking Up), Literature & Thought, 1986
- 《말의 향기》, 고려원, 1988 / Marui hyanggi (Fragrance of Words), Koreaone, 1988
- 《암청의 문신》, 미래사, 1991 / Amcheongui munsin (A Dark Blue Tattoo), Miraesa, 1991
- 《허영자 전시집》, 마을 1998 / Huh Young-ja jeonsijip (A Collection of Huh Young-ja's poems), Maeul, 1998
- 《얼음과 불꽃》, 시월, 2008 / Eoreumgwa bulkkot (Ice and Flame), Siwol, 2008
- 《모순의 향기》, 시인생각, 2013 / Mosunui hyanggi (Scent of Contradiction), Siinsaenggak, 2013

4. Essay

- 《한 송이 꽃도 당신 뜻으로》, 문학예술사, 1978 / Han songi kkotdo dangsin tteuseuro (Do as You Please Even on a Flower), Munhagyesulsa, 1978
- 《아름다운 삶을 향하여》, 문학세계사, 1980 / Areumdaun salmeul hyanghayeo (Towards a Beautiful Life), Munhaksegyesa, 1980
- 《내가 너의 이름을 부르면》, 학원사, 1984 / Naega neoui ireumeul bureumyeon (If I Call Your Name), Hakwonsa, 1984
- 《영혼을 노래하며 아픔을 나누며》, 학원사, 1985 / Yeonghoneul noraehamyeo apeumeul nanumyeo (Singing the Soul and Sharing the Pain), Hakwonsa, 1985
- 《사랑과 추억의 불꽃》, 자유문학사, 1987 / Saranggwa chueogui bulkkot (The Flame of Love and Memories), Jayumunhaksa, 1987
- 《내일 우리가 이별할지라도》, 청맥, 1988 / Naeil uriga ibyeolhaljirado (Even If We Say Good-bye Tomorrow), Cheongmaek, 1988
- 《우리 무엇을 꿈꾸었다 말하랴》, 백상, 1988 / Uri mueoseul kkumkkueotda malharya (What Did We Dream Of), Baeksan, 1988
- 《슬프지 않은 뒷모습은 없다》, 청맥, 1989 / Seulpeuji aneun dwinmoseubeun eopda (There Is No Such a Thing As the Back Without Heartaches), Cheongmaek, 1989
- 《가을 사진첩》, 청아, 1991 / Gaeul sajincheop (Autumn Photo Book), Cheonga, 1991
- 《휘발유 같은 여자이고 싶다》, 시학사, 1992 / Hwibaryu gateun yeojaigo sipda (I Want To Be a Woman Like Ethereal Oil), Sihaksa, 1992
- 《불로뉴 숲의 아침이슬》, 청산, 1993 / Bullonyu supui achimiseul (Morning Dew in Bois de Boulogne), Chungsan, 1993
- 《우리들의 사랑을 위하여》, 자유문학사, 1996 / Urideurui sarangeul wihayeo (For Our Love), Jayumunhaksa, 1996
- 《허영자 수필집》, 마을, 1998 / Huhyoungja supiljip (Huh Young-ja's Essays), Maeul, 1998
- 《사랑의 일곱 가지 빛깔》, 정민미디어, 2003 / Sarangui ilgop gaji bitkkal (The Seven Colors of Love), Jeongmin Media, 2003
- 《살아 있다는 것의 기쁨》, 을지출판공사, 2015 / Sara itdaneun geosui gippeum (The Joy of Being Alive), Euljichulpangongsa, 2015

5. Theoretical Books

- 《한국여성시의 이해와 감상》, 문학아카데미, 1997 / Hankuk yeoseongsiui ihaewa gamsang (Understanding and Appreciation of Korean Women's Poetry), Literature Academy, 1997 by Huh Young-ja et al. (Korean literature of Sungshin Women's University)
- 《한국문학 새로 읽기》, 성신여자대학교출판부, 1999 / Hangunkmunhak saero ikgi (New Reading on Korean Literature), Sungshin Women's University Press, 1999

6. Collections

- 《사랑은 스스로 선택하는 고통입니다》, 둥지, 2008 / Sarangeun seuseuro seontaekaneun gotongimnida (Love Is the Pain You Choose Yourself), Dungji, 2008 by Huh Young-ja, Yu An-jin, Mun Jeong-hui, I Hyang-a, Cheon Yang-hui, Park Hyeon-ryeong, Kim So-yeop, Kim Gyeong-hui, Seo Gyeong-on
- <동백 지다>, 이근배, 허영자 외 / Dongbaeng jida (Camellia Falls) by Lee Geun-bae, Huh Young-ja, et al.
- 《시, 우주를 채우다》, 현대시학사, 2019 / Si, ujureul chaeuda (Poetry Fills the Universe), Hyeondaesihaksa, 2019

7. Children's Poem

- 《어머니의 기도》, 신태양사, 1996 / Eomeoniui gido (Mother's Prayer), Sintaeyangsa, 1996

== Awards ==
- Society of Korean Poets Award (Prize winner – Persimmon and 4 poems; 1972)
- Woltan Literary Prize (Prize winner – The Light and Love of the Dark; 1985)
- National Literary Award (1998)
- Mogwol· Dongni Literary Prize (Prize winner – By the Weight of Silver; 2008)
- Heo Nanseolheon Poetry Prize (2015)
- Republic of Korea's Okgwan Order of Cultural Merit (2015)

== See also ==
- Korean literature
- List of Korean-language poets
- Society of Korean Poets
