= Kim Jong-chul (poet) =

South Korean writer (1947–2014)

- Hangul: 김종철
- Hanja: 金鍾鐵
- RR: Gim Jongcheol
- MR: Kim Chongch'ŏl

Kim Jong-chul (Korean: 김종철; 18 February 1947 – 5 July 2014) was a South Korean poet. He rose to fame in 1968 when he was awarded a prize by the Hankook newspaper for his poem Sound of a Loom. In 1970 Kim won another prize with the Seoul Daily newspaper for his poem Drowned Dreams. He is considered one of the most significant modern Korean poets.

Kim grew up in extreme poverty. He graduated with a degree in Korean Literature from Sorabol University of Arts in Seoul in 1970. In 1997 and 1998 he lectured poetry at PyeongTaek University. He is a member of the Society of Korean Poets and the Korean Writers Association. Among the many prizes Kim has won are the Dong-Joo Yoon Literary Prize (1990), the Nam-Myung Literary Prize (1992), the Pyun-Woon Literary Prize (1993) and the Jeong Jeong Jiyong Literature Prize (2001).

== Style ==
Kim's first publications generally explored basic human emotions. These are sometimes thought to be typical of Korean poetry. Basic emotions include: disappointment, sorrow, parting, illness, or grief. These emotions are considered basic since everyone naturally lives through these emotions as part of their life. This close relationship with everyday life, as well as the subtlety of the emotions are not only a characteristic of Korean poetry, but particularly of Kim Jong-Chul. Kim is considered exceptionally talented at moving the reader's heart when writing about these basic emotions. There are critics who argue that this talent can be explained with Kim's biography which includes extreme poverty and growing up in war time. Because he was poor, Kim joined the army to serve in the Vietnam War voluntarily.

He continuously showed an interest in themes such as desperation, death, or poverty. Kim distanced himself from these motifs in his second collection of poetry, which had a more light-hearted approach to life matters.

In his third collection, Kim returned to darker motifs. This can be explained by Korea's long experience of military dictatorships between the 1960s and 1980s. He describes this time as "a period of universal tragedy." With the coming of the 1990s, the political atmosphere in Korea changed. This was also reflected in some of Kim's poems. It seemed impossible to describe all life in terms of misery and tragedy. Kim continued to recognize the matter in trivial things. He frequently chooses the most mundane objects, such as a pumpkin, a nail or even a grain of rice.

His attitude is often linked with Kim's Roman Catholic faith. It is argued that this drives the author to search for the deeper meaning in everything, even if it appears trivial or insignificant. He hints at this in the preface of his fourth collection of poetry. There are some attempts to link his poems with Christian symbols, but this is frowned upon by others.

Kim gives profound meaning to everyday objects. It is this giving meaning to ordinary objects that some people regard as a special ability of Kim Jong-Chul. Kim argues that there is no meaning in the objects themselves: "If all humanity were to disappear from this earth, a diamond would be nothing but a stone." This involvement with philosophical questions, such as of meaning, is often considered a departure from his earlier works. However, this also helped Kim to be viewed as one of the finest Korean poets of recent times.

== Works ==
Kim has published a number of poetry collections:

- The Last Words of Seoul (1975)
- The Island of Wise Crows Island (1984)
- The Day Has Already Come (1990)
- Meditation on Nails (못에 관한 명상, 1992)
- Poetics of Nails (1998)

In collaboration with the literary group Hands and Fingers, Kim published a number of works:

- The Sea and the Four Seasons (1975)
- In the Sunshine of Grace (1976)
- My Wife Went Out to Somewhere (1979)
- Looking at a Picture of Birds (1980)
- Practice of Meeting in Dewdrops (1981)
- The Heavens Are Made (1982)
- The Sound of Pine Tree Needles (1983)

In collaboration with the literary group Poetic Spirits Group, Kim published a number of works:

- For Beautiful Sensitivity (1985)
- Poems from the Place of Sunrise (1986)
- For a Camel (1988)
- Farewell is Done in Both Ways (1989)
- There is No Sparrow (1990)
- Every Man Resembles Me (1991)

== See also ==
- List of Korean-language poets
