= Choi Dong-ho =

South Korean poet, critic, and professor

Choi Dong-ho (Korean: 최동호; born 26 August 1948) is a South Korean poet, critic, and professor. He studied Korean literature at Korea University at both the undergraduate and graduate levels. He taught Korean literature until his retirement at Korea University, where he is a professor emeritus. He published his first poetry collection in 1976 and debuted as a critic when his critical essay won the Joongang Ilbo New Writer's Contest in 1979. He has written a number of monographs on the spirit of poetry, Eastern poetics, and geukseojeongsi ("extreme lyric poetry"), a term he coined to describe short, easy to understand, and highly evocative poetry. He won the Park Dujin Literary Award in 2009 and the Yushim Award in 2013. Currently, he serves as the president of the Society of Korean Poets and Sisarang Arts and Culture Association.

== Life ==
Choi Dong-ho was born in Suwon, South Korea in 1948. He moved frequently in childhood because his father, being a civil servant, was stationed in various cities like Busan, Samcheonpo, Yeosu, and Mokpo. After starting high school, he took a great interest in literature, philosophy, and history. He enrolled in the Korean Literature program at Korea University in 1966 and received his master's and doctoral degrees there. In 1988, he became an associate professor of Korean literature at the school. He is now a professor emeritus at Korea University and chair professor at Kyungnam University.

In 1976, Hwangsa baram (황사 바람 Yellow Dust Wind), an edited version of a poetry notebook Choi kept since his undergraduate years, was published by Youlhwadang. Choi began working as a critic when his essay, "Kkot, geu sijeok hyeongsangui gujowa mihak." (꽃, 그 시적 형상의 구조와 미학 The Structure and Aesthetics of the Flower's Poetic Imagery), won the JoongAng Ilbo New Writer's Contest in 1979. He founded the literary journals Mireseojung and Lyric Poetry and Poetics.

He has served in a number of positions, including: the president of The Society of Korean Poets, Korean Literature Critics Association, Korean Society of Criticism, and Hwang Sun-Won Society; the director of LTI Korea and The Daesan Foundation; and a member of Arts Council Korea. In 1990, he created the Kim Daljin Literary Prize in honor of the first anniversary of the poet's death and headed the prize committee. In 1996, he organized the inaugural Kim Daljin Literary Festival in Jinhae, South Korea.

He is the winner of the Socheon Lee Heon-gu Literary Criticism Award (1991), Hyundae Buddhist Literary Award for Poetry (1996), Poetry and Poetics Award for Criticism (1996), Kim Hwan-tae Literary Criticism Award (1998), Pyeon-un Literature Award for Criticism (1999), Daesan Literary Award for Criticism (2006), Hyesan Park Dujin Literary Award (2009), and Gosan Yun Seon-do Literary Award for Modern Poetry (2009).

== Writing ==
Choi Dong-ho is a celebrated lyrical poet and poetry critic in South Korea. He has stressed the importance of spiritualism and geukseojeong ("extreme lyricism") in his critical essays. Lyrical poetry has been declining in the South Korean modern literary scene, perhaps due to industrialization and the spread of digital culture. Nevertheless, Choi argues that the value of lyric poetry does not decrease even if the times change. He is concerned with how literature and language can retain their vitality in the digital age and how art can connect emotionally with readers. He also writes about the significance of Eastern philosophy and ecologism in today's society and how to write poems that embody those ideologies. Such ruminations are reflected in his own poetry.

Choi's poetry continuously asks questions about existence and essence. His early works explore existence and the place of existence through sound and shadow. In particular, he examines the paradoxical relationship between existence and non-existence in his second poetry collection Achim cheksang (아침책상 Morning Desk), and probes the issue further in his third collection Ttakttagurineun eodie sumeoitneunga (딱따구리는 어디에 숨어있는가 Where Is the Woodpecker Hiding?). His subsequent works Gongnori haneun dalma (공놀이 하는 달마 Bodhidharma Playing Ball) and Eoreum eolgul (얼음얼굴 Ice Face) are regarded as inquiries into existence taken to the extreme. His later poetry collections link the issue of existence to basic tenets of Eastern philosophy. Choi evokes Buddhist thought on the void by referring to shadows, empty space, ghosts, and other intangibles. He describes empty space as not simply a space that contains nothing, but a place of creation and demise. Choi's poems, which perceive this empty space and the void, can thus be considered a culmination of spiritualist literature that deals with the beginning and end of existence.

== Works ==
Poetry Collections

1. 『황사바람』(열화당, 1976)

Yellow Dust Wind. Youlhwadang, 1976.

2. 『아침책상』(민음사, 1988)

Morning Desk. Minumsa, 1988.

3. 『딱따구리는 어디에 숨어 있는가』(민음사, 1995)

Where Is the Woodpecker Hiding? Minumsa, 1995.

4. 『공놀이 하는 달마』(민음사, 2002)

Bodhidharma Playing Ball. Minumsa, 2002.

5. 『불꽃 비단벌레』(서정시학, 2009)

The Spark of the Jewel Beetle. Lyric Poetry and Poetics, 2009.

6. 『얼음 얼굴』(서정시학, 2011)

Ice Face. Lyric Poetry and Poetics, 2011.

Critical Essay Collections and Monographs

1. 『시의 해석』(새문사, 1983)

The Interpretation of Poetry. Saemoon, 1983.

2. 『현대시의 정신사』(열음사, 1985)

The Spiritual History of Contemporary Poetry. Yeuleumsa, 1985.

3. 『불확정시대의 문학』(문학과 지성사, 1987)

Literature in Uncertain Times. Moonji, 1987.

4. 『한국현대시의 의식현상학적 연구』(고려대학교민족문화연구원, 1989)

Phenomenological Study of Contemporary Korean Poetry. Research Institute of Korean Studies (RIKS), Korea University, 1989.

5. 『80년대 젊은 시인들』(시민, 1990)

Young Poets of the 1980s. Simin, 1990.

6. 『새로운 비평 논리를 찾아서』(나남, 1990)

In Search of New Logic of Criticism. Nanam, 1990.

7. 『평정의 시학을 위하여』(민음사, 1991)

For the Poetics of Pacification. Minumsa, 1991.

8. 『남북한 현대문학사』(나남, 1995)

History of Contemporary Literature in North and South Korea. Nanam, 1995.

9. 『삶의 깊이와 시적 상상』(한국문학도서관, 1995)

The Depth of Life and Poetic Imagination. KLL, 1995.

10. 『하나의 도에 이르는 시학』(고려대학교 출판부, 1997)

Poetics as a Form of Enlightenment. Korea University Press, 1997.

11. 『시 읽기의 즐거움』(고려대학교 출판부, 1999)

The Joy of Reading Poetry. Korea University Press, 1999.

12. 『디지털 문화와 생태시학』(문학동네, 2000)

Digital Culture and Ecological Poetics. Munhakdongne, 2000.

13. 『인터넷 시대의 시창작론』(고려대학교 출판부, 2002)

Writing Poetry in the Internet Age. Korea University Press, 2002.

14. 『정지용 사전』(고려대학교 출판부, 2003)

Chong Chi-Yong Dictionary. Korea University Press, 2003.

15. 『한국현대시사의 감각』(고려대학교출판부, 2004)

Sensibilities of Contemporary Korean Poetry. Korea University Press, 2004.

16. 『진흙 천국의 시적 주술』(문학동네, 2006)

Poetic Magic in a Muddy Heaven. Munhakdongne, 2006.

17. 『한국 현대시와 물의 상상력』(서정시학, 2010)

Contemporary Korean Poetry and the Imagery of Water. Lyric Poetry and Poetics, 2010.

18. 『디지털 코드와 극서정시』(서정시학, 2012)

Digital Code and Extreme Lyric Poetry. Lyric Poetry and Poetics, 2012.

19. 『정지용 시와 비평의 고고학』(서정시학, 2013)

Chong Chi-Yong's Poetry and the Archaeology of Criticism. Lyric Poetry and Poetics, 2013.

20. 『황순원 문학과 인간 탐구』(서정시학, 2015)

Hwang Sun-Won's Works and their Exploration of People. Lyric Poetry and Poetics, 2015.

21. 『최동호 평론 선집』(지식을 만드는 지식, 2015)

Anthology of Critical Essays by Choi Dong-ho. Zmanz, 2015.

Works in Translation (partial)

1. Modern Korean Literature: 1945–1990 (English)

2. Сборник корейской поэзии (Russian)

3. СҮВОН ХОТЫН ӨМНӨД ХААЛГАНЫ ТОЛГОД (Mongolian)

== Awards ==
1. 1985: Republic of Korea Award for Criticism

2. 1991: Socheon Lee Heon-gu Literary Criticism Award

3. 1996: Inaugural Poetry and Poetics Award for Criticism

4. 1996: Inaugural Hyundae Buddhist Literature Prize

5. 1998: 10th Kim Hwan-tae Literary Criticism Award

6. 1999: 9th Pyeon-un Literature Award

7. 2009: 9th Gosan Yun Seon-do Literary Award for Poetry

8. 2009: 4th Hyesan Park Dujin Literary Award

9. 2013: 11th Yushim Award for Poetry
