= Chang Man-yong =

South Korean poet (1914–1977)

- Hangul: 장만영
- Hanja: 張萬榮
- RR: Jang Manyeong
- MR: Chang Manyŏng

Art name
- Hangul: 초애
- Hanja: 草涯
- RR: Choae
- MR: Ch'oae

Chang Man-yong (Korean: 장만영; January 25, 1914 – 1977) was a Korean poet and journalist associated with the modernist movement of the 1930s. He was born in Yeonbaek County, Kōkai Province, Korea, Empire of Japan. He attended Keijō High School in Seoul and later the Mijakki English School in Tokyo.

Considered a major representative of 1930s Korean modernism, he is distinct from other poets in that tradition in his embrace of pastoral lyricism. Nostalgic themes of rural life were used to reflect the difficulty and anguish of the times in which Chang lived; he continued to use these devices to reflect the hardship of life in early South Korea.

Chang served as editor of the Seoul Shinmun, and was also president of the Society of Korean Poets.

== See also ==
- Korean literature
- Korean poetry
- List of Korean-language poets
