= JEI Corporation =

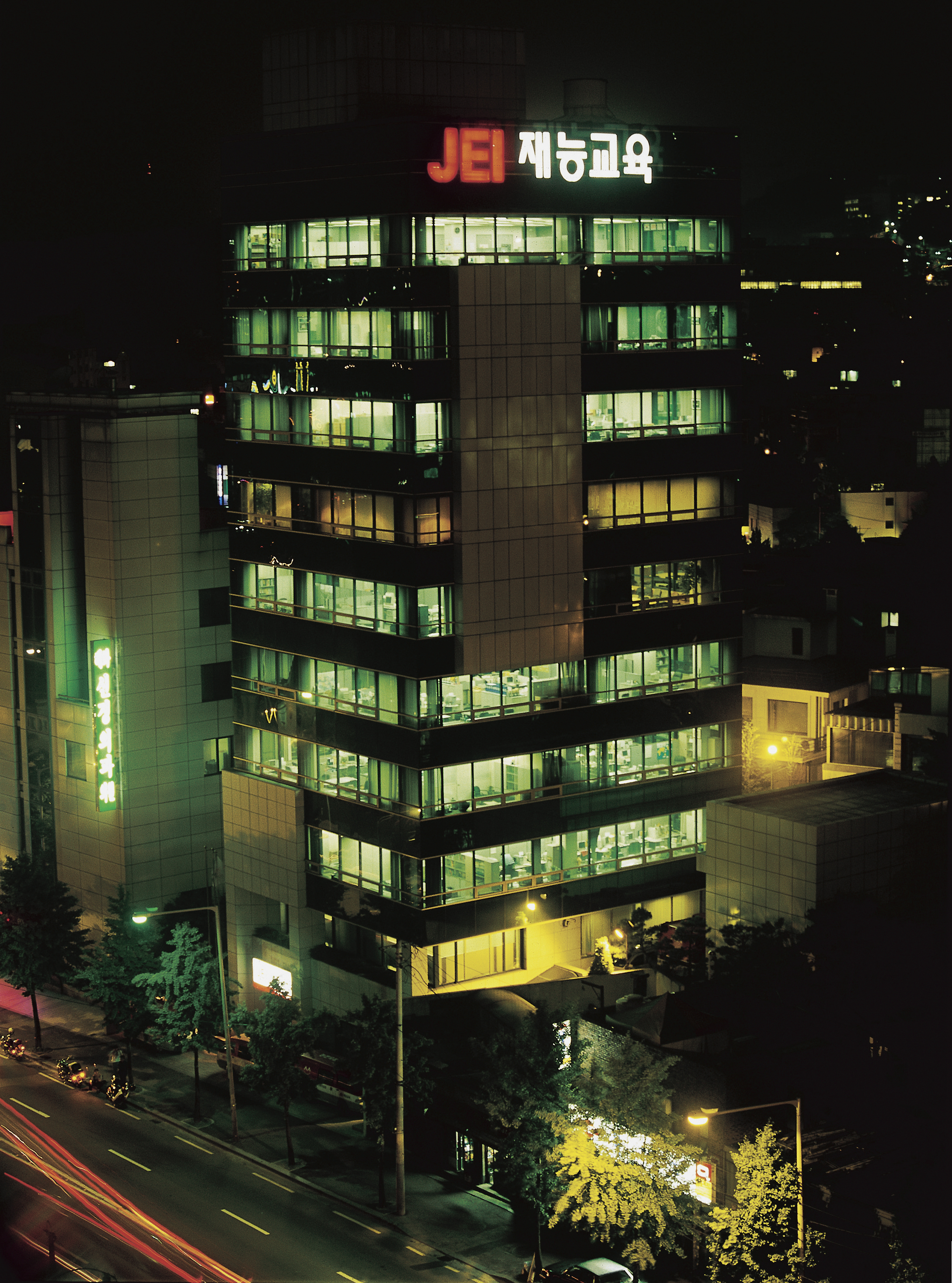
- JEI Corporation Building in Hyehwa-dong, Seoul
- Traded as: JEI Corporation
- Industry: Education
- Founded: May 5, 1977
- Founder: Sung-hoon Park
- Website: www.jei.com

- JEI Corporation
- Hangul: 재능교육
- Hanja: 才能敎育
- RR: Jaeneung gyoyuk
- MR: Chaenŭng kyoyuk

JEI Corporation (JEI: Jaeneung Educational Institute) is a Korean educational company founded in 1977. Currently, the headquarters is located at 293 Changgyeonggungro, Jongno-gu, Seoul. The company is known for its supplementary education programs for children and adults. JEI offers supplementary learning programs for home education, operating self-learning centers for children (JEI Learning Center) and establishes a general education network in various fields including publishing, broadcasting, IT, printing, distribution, culture and arts. In particular, the company has been supporting Si-nangsong(poetry recitation) for 27 years since 1991. The founder, Sung-hoon Park, was honored as an honorary poet at the Society of Korean Poets for his contribution to promote the 'Si-nangsong' in Korea. Also, the JCC Art Center located in Hyehwa-dong, recognized as the only work of renowned Japanese architect Tadao Ando in downtown Seoul, is owned and operated by JEI. Outside of S. Korea, JEI's learning program is offered in U.S., Canada, China, Japan, Australia and New Zealand exporting its ‘JEI’ brand globally.

== Learning Programs ==
- In Korea, JEI offers Self-Learning programs for students from age 3 to adults as following.
  - JEI SSRO Math, JEI SSRO Speed Math, Thinking Pizzaa, JEI SSRO Hangeul, JEI SSRO Korea, JEI SSRO Little English, JEI SSRO English, JEI SSRO Little Hanja, JEI SSRO Chinese, JEI SSRO Japanese, JEI SSRO Social Studies, JEI SSRO Science, Thinking Cookie Book
- In countries outside of Korea, JEI offers total of 9 Self-Learning programs adapted for overseas local environment. These are available in English, Chinese and Korean.
  - In English: JEI Math, JEI Problem Solving Math, JEI English, Critical & Creative Thinking, JEI Reading & Writing
  - In Chinese: JEI 才能数学, JEI 才能Little英語, JEI 才能英語, 思考的比萨

== Cultural activities ==
- JEI Poetry Recitation Contest (1991~): It is jointly hosted with the Society of Korean Poets and awarded the certificate of 'Si-nangsong-ga' to the winner of the competition.
- Jaenenung Poetry Recitation Association (1994~) : It is an organization that promotes the poetry recitation centering on 'Si-nangsong-ga'.
- JEI Storytelling Contest (2001~)

== See also ==
- Society of Korean Poets
- Si-nangsong
- Honorary Poets
- JCC (Jaeneung Culture Center)
