= Shin Seok Cho =

South Korean poet (1909–1975)

Shin Seok-cho
- Born: 8 May 1909
- Died: 8 March 1975 (aged 65)
- Citizenship: South Korean
- Writing career
- Language: Korean

- Shin Seok Cho
- Hangul: 신석초
- Hanja: 申石艸
- RR: Sin Seokcho
- MR: Sin Sŏkch'o

Shin Seok-cho (1909–1975) was a Korean poet and journalist. He was born in Seocheon, Chungcheongnam-do, in 1909. Involved with socialism, he joined Korean Artist Proletarian Federation (KAPF) but subsequently withdrew. In 1935, he met Yi Yuk-sa and became a close acquaintance.

He published poems such as "Bara dance", "Snakes", and "Pacho". He also served as the president of the Society of Korean Poets, and worked as a writer for the Hankook Ilbo.

== Works list ==
- "Bara dance"
- "The song of the storm"
- "Cheo-yong says"

== See also ==
- Society of Korean Poets
- Seocheon County
