= Jaeneung Culture Center =

JCC (Jaeneung Culture Center)

General information
- Type: art center, art museum
- Location: 35-29 Changgyeonggung-ro, Jongro-gu, Seoul, South Korea 03076, Seoul, South Korea
- Opened: 2015
- Client: JEI Culture Foundation
- Owner: JEI Corporation

Design and construction
- Architect: Tadao Ando

Website
- Official Website

The JCC, Jaeneung Culture Center, is a multi purpose complex for education and culture designed by Ando Tadao, a renowned Japanese architect. It is located in Hyehwa-dong, Seoul, South Korea and consists of two buildings, JCC Art Center and JCC Creative Center. The JCC Art Center has a concert hall and a museum (JCC Museum) in the main building. The JCC Creative Center has an auditorium and a creative studio along with a roof garden.
