= Society of Korean Poets =

Poet organization in South Korea

- 한국시인협회
- Formation: 1957
- President: Choi Dong-ho
- Website: www.koreapoet.com

Korean name
- Hangul: 한국시인협회
- Hanja: 韓國詩人協會
- RR: Hanguk siin hyeophoe
- MR: Han'guk siin hyŏphoe

The Society of Korean Poets (Korean: 한국시인협회) is a literary organization established in 1957. It is the oldest active poetry organization in South Korea.

Every year, the organization awards the Society of Korean Poets Award, and holds the National High School Students' Literary Prize.

Today it has 1,500 members. The current president is Choi Dong-ho. The current office is located at Unni-dong 65–1, Jongno-gu, Seoul.

The past presidents are Yu Chi-hwan, Cho Chi-hun, Chang Man-yong, Shin Seok Cho, Park Mok-wol, Jung Han Mo, Cho Byung-hwa, Kim Nam-jo, Kim Chunsu, Kim Jong-gil, Hong Yun-suk, Kim Kwang-lim, Lee Hyeonggi, Sung Chan-gyeong, Chyung Jinkyu, Huh Young-ja, Lee Geunbae, Kim Jong-hae, Oh Sae-Young, Oh Takbeon and Kim Jong-chul.

== Event activities ==
- Society of Korean Poets Award
- National High School Student Essay Contest
- Si-nangsong (poetry recitation) event
  - JEI Poetry Recitation Contest (joint hosting: JEI Corporation)

== See also ==
- Honorary Poets
- Si-nangsong
