= Lee Geunbae =

South Korean poet (born 1940)

- Born: March 1, 1940 (age 86); Dangjin, Chungcheongnam-do, South Korea
- Writing career
- Language: Korean

Korean name
- Hangul: 이근배
- Hanja: 李根培
- RR: I Geunbae
- MR: I Kŭnbae

Lee Geunbae (Korean: 이근배; born 1 March 1940) is a South Korean sijo poet. He is known for his compositions on Korea's traditions and indigenous environments. He is one of the major contemporary sijo poets. In 2002, he was chosen as chairman of the Society of Korean Poets. He has served as the director of the Korean Headquarters of the International PEN. He is currently a creative writing professor at JEI University.

== Biography ==
Lee Geunbae was born on March 1, 1940, in Dangjin, Chūseinan Province, Korea, Empire of Japan. His pen name is Sacheon. In 1958 he started studying creative writing at Seorabeol Art College and practiced poetry. Before his literary debut, he had already published in 1960 his first collection Sarangeul yeonjuhaneun kkotnamu (사랑을 연주하는 꽃나무 The Flower Tree That Sings Love). He began his literary career in 1961 when he won the Kyunghyang Daily News New Writer's Award with sijo Myobimyeong (묘비명 The Epitaph), as well as the Seoul Shinmun New Writer's Contest with Byeok (벽 The Wall). And until 1964 he also had sijo as well as children's poems selected for contests from Chosun Ilbo and Don-A Ilbo. He is the only writer in Korea to have won a new writer's contest four times. He was also the publisher and editor-in-chief of Hankook Munhak, and editor-in-chief of Minjokgwa munhak. He has served as the president of the Association of Korean Sijo Poets, the president of the Society of Korean Poets, the deputy director of the Korean Writers Association, and the director of the Korean Headquarters of the International PEN. He has taught poetry writing and theory on poetry at Seoul Institute of the Arts, Chugye University for the Arts, and Chung-Ang University. He is currently serving as the president of the Jiyonghoe (지용회) and the Association for Commemoration of Gong Cho, and he is a creative writing professor at JEI University. He has won the New Artist Award, the Garam Sijo Literary Award, the Republic of Korea Writer Award, the Joongang Sijo Grand Prize, the Hyundae Buddhist Literature Prize, the Cheong Chi-Yong Literature Prize, and the Manhae Literature Prize.

== Writing ==
Lee Geunbae's early sijos expressed affection for the mother country, his spiritual home country. By revealing the spirit of freedom based on humanism, he also displayed how sijo is a free verse form of a certain type, one that reaches the life's inner sides with emotions and rules. In the 1960s when he had debuted, there were too many poems in Korea that overemphasized on social commentary or were difficult to understand. In such a time, Lee Geunbae's works contributed towards the revival of traditional lyricism.

Also, his later works often used historical figures as subject matter, laying out 'historical imagination' with lyrical melody. For example, in Chusareul humchida (추사를 훔치다 Stealing Chusa), by poetizing Kim Chŏnghŭi and Kim Byeong-yeon, two greats figures from the Joseon dynasty, he summoned the long gone tradition and beauty of the past.

He attempts to have the spirit of a seonbi, possessing morality and generosity in a corrupt world. However, his ultimate goal is to have a poetic spirit like a sinseon's (a Taoist hermit with mystical powers), that "listens with the eyes, sees with the nose, and talks with the ears." As such, through his tranquil sijo, he has visualized the emptiness of the world, and the nature of humanity. His works are considered as literary instances where modern society and inner humanity were explored through the traditional form of sijo.

== Works ==
=== Poetry collections ===
- Sarangeul yeonjuhaneun kkotnamu (사랑을 연주하는 꽃나무 The Flower Tree That Sings Love), 1960.
- Noraeyeo noraeyeo (노래여 노래여 A Song, a Song), MunhakSegyeSa, 1981
- Hangang (한강 Han River), Goryeowon, 1985
- Saramdeuli saega doego sipeun kkadalgeul anda (사람들이 새가 되고 싶은 까닭을 안다 I Know Why People Want to be Birds), MunhakSegyeSa, 2004
- Jongsorineun kkeuteopsi saebyeokeul kkaeunda (종소리는 끝없이 새벽을 깨운다 The Bells Endlessly Awaken the Dawn), Donghaksa, 2006.
- Chusareul humchida (추사를 훔치다 Stealing Chusa), Moonhak Soochup, 2013.

== Awards ==
- 1983 Garam Sijo Literary Award
- 1987 Republic of Korea Writer Award
- 1987 Joongang Sijo Grand Prize,
- 1997 Yukdang Literature Prize
- 1999 Wolha Literature Prize
- 2000 Pyeon-un Literature Prize
- 2010 Gosan Literature Prize
- 2011 Manhae Prize
- 2015 Jeong Jiyong Literature Prize
