= Cho Byung-hwa =

South Korean writer (1921–2003)

- Died: March 8, 2003 (aged 81)
- Citizenship: South Korean
- Education: Tokyo Teachers College
- Writing career
- Language: Korean

- Korean name
- Hangul: 조병화
- Hanja: 趙炳華
- RR: Jo Byeonghwa
- MR: Cho Pyŏnghwa

Cho Byung-hwa (Korean: 조병화; May 2, 1921 – March 8, 2003) was a major South Korean poet, critic and essayist, known for the accessibility of his writing. As well as his work as a writer and academic, he was also an amateur athlete and painter.

== Life ==
Cho Byung-hwa was born in Anseong, Korea, Empire of Japan. He graduated from Keijō Normal School in Keijō (Seoul), and in 1945 he completed his studies at Tokyo Teachers College with a major in physics. He then taught at Inchon Middle School and Seoul High School. Cho's academic career began with his 1959 appointment to Kyunghee University, where he rose to become dean of the graduate school of education. In 1981 he left to become head of the literary faculty at Inha University, and later became dean of the graduate school there. Cho occupied leading positions in such organizations as the Korean Poets' Association, the Korean Writers' Association, the Korea Arts Council and the Korean Academy of Arts and Letters. He was also president of the 4th World Congress of Poets, held in Seoul in 1979. In 1999 he was given an honorary degree at the Victoria University, Australia.

== Work ==
Cho officially entered the literary world in 1949 with his book of poems, The Heritage I Want to Disown (1949), which was soon followed by more collections. His early works were written in standard form and rhythm, and expressed the love, joys and sorrow of modern man. His later works gives an insight into the existence and fate of humanity. He was an extraordinarily prolific poet, using a frank conversational style, although often employing fragmented grammar and broken phrases. One finds it, for example, punctuating the simple couplets that describe the humdrum tourist scene in "The Toksu Palace":

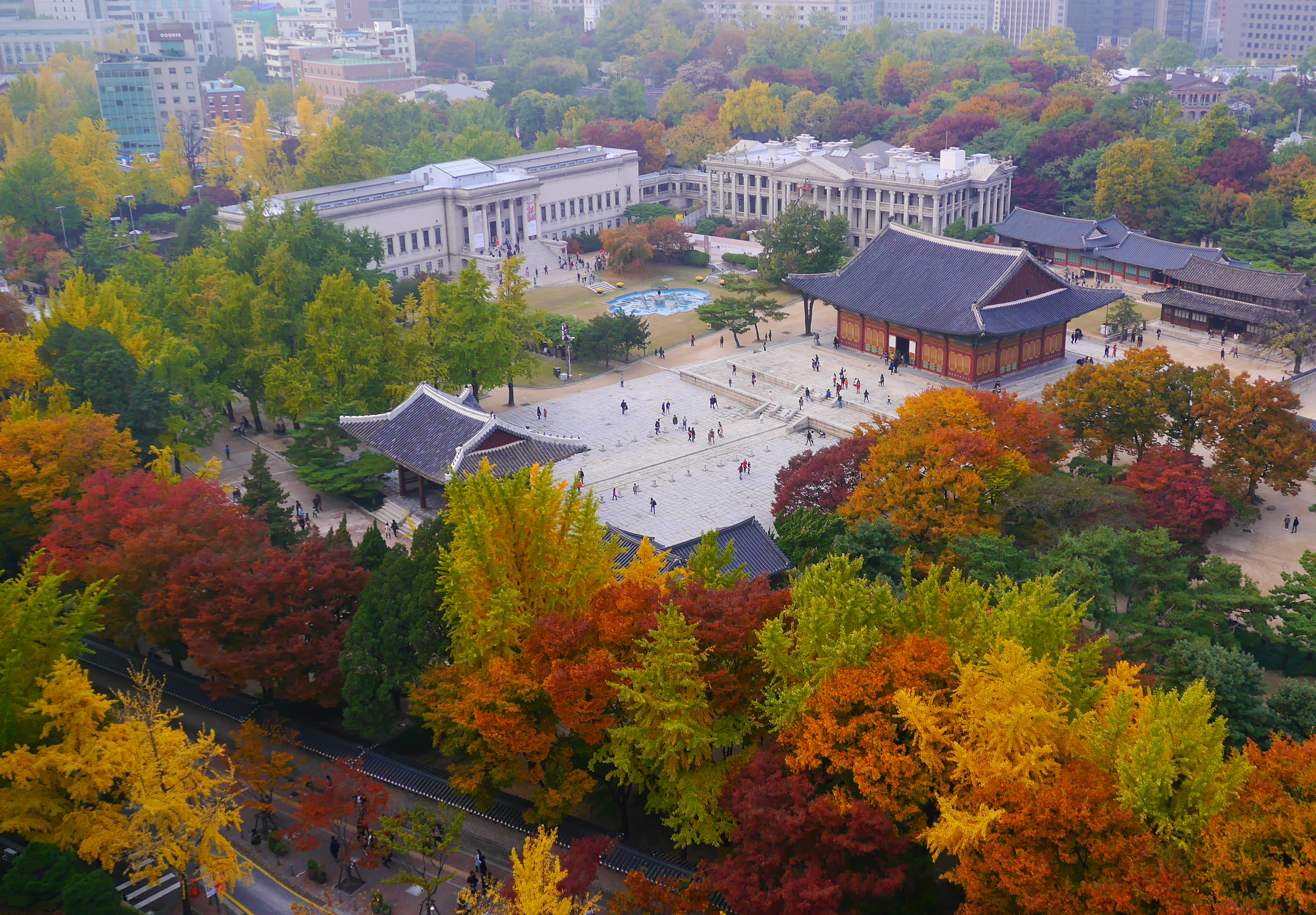
Tourists at the palace

A butterfly reels away
from the trampled lawn by the lake.

A bronze seal spouts water from its mouth
in the garden of the marble building.

A tramp is taking a fitful nap
in the shadow of wisteria vines.

Wastepaper, cigarette butts, chewing gum
strewn on the ground by the Sunday crowd.

With dull movements
a weary old widow cleans up the mess.

Fading azaleas.
Disillusion.

A dreary feeling weighs upon
the peony garden in the Toksu palace.

The trampled lawn by the lake
- little lances of gleaming light.

Cho has been lauded as a poet who tore down the notion that modern poetry must be obscure and won the sympathy of many readers by his candid expression in everyday language of the sentiments and experiences of his own life. For some critics, however, his vision is too self-centered and pays scant attention to the social or political dimensions underlying the realities he describes. Thus the critical reception of his poetry divides between admiration of its harmony while noting that it lacks innovation or much striving after aesthetic quality for its own sake. The sheer volume of his published work, which includes 44 poetry collections among his 130 books, coupled with a lack of much variety or overall dramatic development there, has probably done him a disservice.

Besides poetry, he published four books of poetic theory, including If Night Goes, Morning Comes (Bami gamyeon achimi onda), and nearly thirty collections of essays, including A Poet's Notebook (Siinui bimangnok), as well as albums of his paintings.

== Works in translation ==
- Dröm (꿈)
- un soleil infini (조병화 시선-무수한 태양)

== Works in Korean (partial) ==
- Comfort for Just a Day (Harumanui wian)
- Seashell Chamber (Paegagui Chimsil)
- Before Love Leaves (Sarangi gagi jeone),
- Seoul, Those Who Live Waiting (Gidarimyeo saneun saramdeul)
- The Reason for Coexistence (Gongjonui iyu)
- Searching for Time's Abode (Siganui suksoreul deodeumeoseo)
- Somewhere Tomorrow (Naeil eoneu jarieseo),
- Napping Lamp (Gasugui laempeu)
- Between Dust and Wind (Meonjiwa baram sai)
- From Inside the Window to Outside (Chang aneseo chang bakke)
- The Road to Fog (Angaero ganeun gil)
- Distant Promise (Meonameon yaksok),
- Star Appearing Even on a Dark Night (Eoduun bamedo byeoreun tteoseo)
- On the Way By (Jinaganeun gire)
- Unregretted Solitude (Huhoe eomneun godok)
- Cry of the Camel (Nagtaui ureumsori)
- Small Wild Flower Blooming in a Foreign Land (Tahyange pin jag-eun deulkkot).

== Awards ==
- Asian Liberty Literature Prize, 1960
- Grand Prize of the Second World Poets' Conference, 1973
- Seoul City Cultural Award, 1981
- Korea Arts Council Award, 1985
- Samil Prize, 1990
- Literature Prize of the Republic of Korea, 1992

== See also ==
- Korean poetry
- Korean literature
- Society of Korean Poets
