= Kim Chunsu =

South Korean poet (1922–2004)

- Born: November 25, 1922
- Died: November 29, 2004 (aged 82)
- Citizenship: South Korean
- Writing career
- Language: Korean

- Kim Chunsu
- Hangul: 김춘수
- Hanja: 金春洙
- RR: Gim Chunsu
- MR: Kim Ch'unsu

Kim Chunsu (Korean: 김춘수; Hanja: 金春洙; November 25, 1922 – November 29, 2004) was one of the leading South Korean poets of the late twentieth century. He won numerous literary awards and was a professor of Korean Literature. His works have been translated into English, German and Spanish.

== Biography ==
Kim was born in Chungmu (present-day Tongyeong) on November 25, 1922. He studied literature at Nihon University in Japan from 1940 to 1943, at which time he was expelled and jailed for speaking against the Japanese Empire. After his release seven months later, he returned to Korea and taught in middle and high schools. He began to publish poetry in 1946. He joined the faculty of Kyungpook National University in 1965, and became Dean of the Department of Literature at Yeungnam University in 1978. In 1981, he was elected to the National Assembly. Kim died on November 29, 2004.

== Work ==
He made his debut with the publication of his poem "The Hothouse" in the eighth volume of Bamboo Shoots and release of his collection of poems, Clouds and Roses, the same year. After the introduction of his work in the late forties, however, Kim's career as a poet spanned almost four decades, and his writing evolved and transformed itself with the times. His work can be roughly divided into four periods. The first, which includes his works such as "A Flower" and "An Introductory Poem for a Flower", focuses on the fundamental role of language and linguistics in attaining consciousness of any particular object's existence. The second period, which encompassed the late 1950s to the late 1960s, was filled with works that used description-oriented narrative images, imagery and aesthetic metaphor purely for imagery's sake. Word play, such as that in "Ballad Tone" (Tareongjo), was also prominent in Kim's works during these years.

The poem "The Heartbreak of Cheoyong" (Cheoyong danjang) signaled the beginning of the third period and a radical break with from his previous work. The poems of this period, rather than centering on the chimerical world of images that were the subject of his previous poetry, emphasized the other worldly, the plane beyond images. His fourth period of poetry, which encompasses his work 1970's until the early 1980s, was marked by Kim's musings and reflections on art and religion, into which he sought insight into their purpose for humanity and their relevance to the earthly life.

Kim won numerous awards including the second Korean Poets' Association Prize, the seventh Asia Freedom Literature Prize, the Art Academy Prize, and the Culture Medal. In 2007, he was listed by the Korean Poets' Association among the ten most important modern Korean poets.

== Works in translation ==
English

- The Snow Falling on Chagall's Village (김춘수 시선 <샤갈의 마을에 내리는 눈>)

Spanish

- Poemas (김춘수 시선)
- Razón de las sinrazones (김춘수 시선)

German

- Blätter des Indong (김춘수 시선집 <인동초>)

French

- Prélude au poème pour une fleur (김춘수 시선)

Japanese

- 韓国三人詩選 (한국 현대 시선)
- 鏡の中の天使 (거울 속의 천사)

== Works in Korean (partial) ==
Poetry Collections

- The Swamp (Neup)
- Flag (Gi)
- Sketch of a Flower (Kkochui somyo
- Death of a Girl in Budapest (Budapeseuteueseoui sonyeoui jugeum)
- Ballad Tone and Others (Tareongjo gita), Cheoyong
- Selected Poems of Kim Chunsu, Namcheon
- A Rain-Soaked Moon
- After Cheoyong
- The Heartbreak of Cheoyong (Cheoyong danjang)
- The Sleep Standing Forest (Seoseo jamdeuneun sup)

Academic Works

- The Morphology of Modern Korean Poetry
- Understanding Poetry
- Meaning and Meaninglessness
- The Countenance of Poetry (Siui Pyojeong)

== Awards ==
- Second Korean Poets' Association Prize
- Seventh Asia Freedom Literature Prize
- Art Academy Prize
- Culture Medal
- Inchon Award

== Bibliography ==
Kim Ch'un-Su, The Snow Falling on Chagall's Village: Selected Poems. Translated from Korean into English by Kim Jong-Gil. Cornell East Asia Series, 93. Ithaca, NY: East Asia Program, Cornell University, 1998.

== See also ==
- List of Korean-language poets
- Korean poetry
- Korean culture
- Society of Korean Poets
