= Hong Yun-Sook =

South Korean writer (1925–2015)

- Born: 1925
- Died: 12 October 2015 (age 90)
- Citizenship: South Korean
- Spouse: Yang Han Mo
- Writing career
- Pen name: Yeosa
- Language: Korean
- Notable awards: Samil Prize

Korean name
- Hangul: 홍윤숙
- Hanja: 洪允淑
- RR: Hong Yunsuk
- MR: Hong Yunsuk

Hong Yun-Sook (Korean: 홍윤숙; 1925 – 12 October 2015) was considered one of the leading Korean female poets of her generation. She is also known by her pen name YeoSa (Beautiful Story).

== Biography ==
Hong was born in 1925 in Chongju, Heianhoku Province, Korea, Empire of Japan. She lived in Seoul most of her life. Upon graduating from DongDuk Girls' School and Seoul Women's Teachers College (경성 여자 사범학교, 1944), she worked as a teacher for a few years before beginning her studies at the Seoul National University College of Education. She was an active member of the Theater Club at the college, acted as the first secretary, and played many roles on stage as well as writing plays. She was unable to finish her education, however, due to the outbreak of the Korean War. Hong Yunsuk later served as president of Korean Women Writers' Association (Hangug-yeoryu-munhag-inhoe) and Korean Poets Society (Hangugsi-inhyeobhoe). Her literary and political foundations were established during this period of post WWII and pre-Korean War. Throughout her life, she worked as a teacher, reporter, and a lecturer at Sangmyung Women's College.

== Work ==
Hong Yun-Sook first published a poem "Fall" in Literary Times (Mun Ye ShinBo) in 1947. In the same time frame, her play was selected in the prestigious "New Spring Literary Debut" by ChoSun IlBo. Much of her earlier work from this period was lost during the Korean War. Her first poetry book, "YeoSa ShiJip," was published in 1962. Since then she has published 17 volumes of original poetry as well as numerous collections of essays, plays, and poetic plays.

According to the specialist on Korean poetry, Brother Anthony, "Her vision of life is deeply affected by the suffering brought by the Korean War and the lasting division of Korea. Her poetic universe is often dark and inclined to pessimism. Perhaps the fact that she is unable to visit her native region in the North helps to explain the many images of life as an unending journey found in her work. The themes of individual solitude and of the emptiness of modern life are expressed in many poems. When she tackles more public themes, the longing for the reunification of Korea dominates her concerns."

== Works in translation ==
- Sunligh In A Distance Place: Selected Poems by Hong Yunsook. Translated by Brother Anthony of Taize; Edited with Introduction and Commentary by Chan E. Park. Publication of the Ohio State University, 2013. ISBN 978-0-87415-380-4
- Sunlight on the Land Far from Home: Collected Poems by Hong Yun-Sook. Translated by Lee Dong-Jin; Revised by Cornelia Oefelein. Interdisciplinary Center for Comparative Studies, University of Siena (Italy). Printed in Germany, Hubert & Co, Gȍttingen, 2004. ISBN 3-929181-64-9
- Some of her translated poems are in Modern Korean Poetry, selected and translated with an introduction by Jaihiun J. Kim; Asian Humanities Press: Fremont, California, 1994.

== Works in Korean (partial) ==
- The Daily Sound of a Clock (Ilsang-ui sigyesoli)
- Yeosasijib
- A Windmill (Pungcha)
- Theory of Decoration (Jangsignon),
- The Daily Sound of a Clock (Ilsang-ui sigyesori)
- Sunlight In A Distant Place (Tagwan-ui haes-sal),
- Rules of Life (Saneun beob)
- A village Beyond the Sun (Tae-yang-ui geonneoma-eul)
- A long Poetry On a Short Night (Jjalb-eun bam-e gin sileul)

== Awards ==
She has received various awards and is a member of National Academy of Arts. Her continued literary endeavors were most recently recognized in 2012 when she received the 4th Ku Sang Literary Award. Her contemporary poets include Ku Sang, Ko Un, and Kim Nam-Jo. In 2001, she won the Samil Prize.

== See also ==
- List of Korean-language poets
- Society of Korean Poets
