= Shin Chang-jae =

South Korean businessman (born 1953 or 1954)

- Born: 1953 or 1954 (age 72–73)
- Education: Seoul National University
- Occupations: Chairman and CEO, Kyobo Life Insurance Company
- Children: 2

Shin Chang-jae (Korean: 신창재; born 1953 or 1954) is a South Korean businessman. He is the chairman and CEO of Kyobo Life Insurance Company.

He is among the richest people in South Korea. In April 2024, Forbes estimated his net wealth at US$1.09 billion and ranked him 34th richest in the country.

He is the son of Shin Yong-ho, who founded Kyobo Life Insurance Company in 1958. Shin received a doctorate from Seoul National University.

Kyobo Life Insurance Building, Seoul

He trained as an obstetrician and worked as a professor at the Seoul National University medical school. He has been chairman and CEO of Kyobo Life Insurance Company since 2000. In June 2015, Forbes estimated his net worth at US$2.3 billion.

He is married with two sons and lives in Seoul, South Korea.
