= Si-nangsong =

Style of poetry recitation in Korea

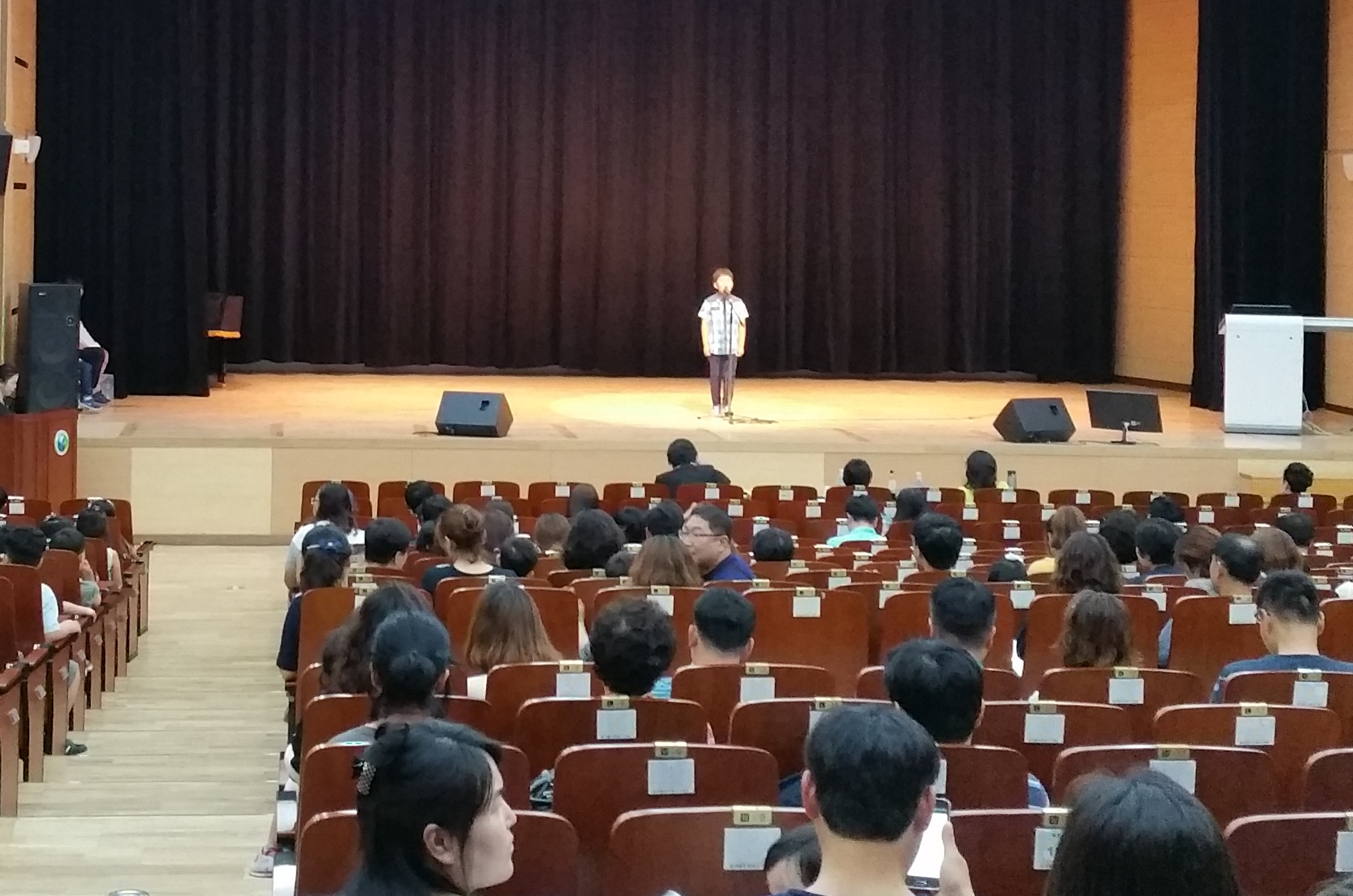
Si-nangsong (poetry recitation) contest

Si-nangsong (Korean: 시낭송; Hanja: 詩朗誦) refers to the Korean poetry recitation style, which conveys emotions by memorizing poems.

== History ==
In South Korea, it began to be known to the public through a festival called 'Hurrah for the Poets' in 1967. At that time, many poets participated in the festival, and the poetry recitation contest for the general public was held for the first time. Since then, there have been many poetry recitation contest and groups in South Korea. Even now, there are many contest participating in the competition.

== Si-nangsong-ga ==
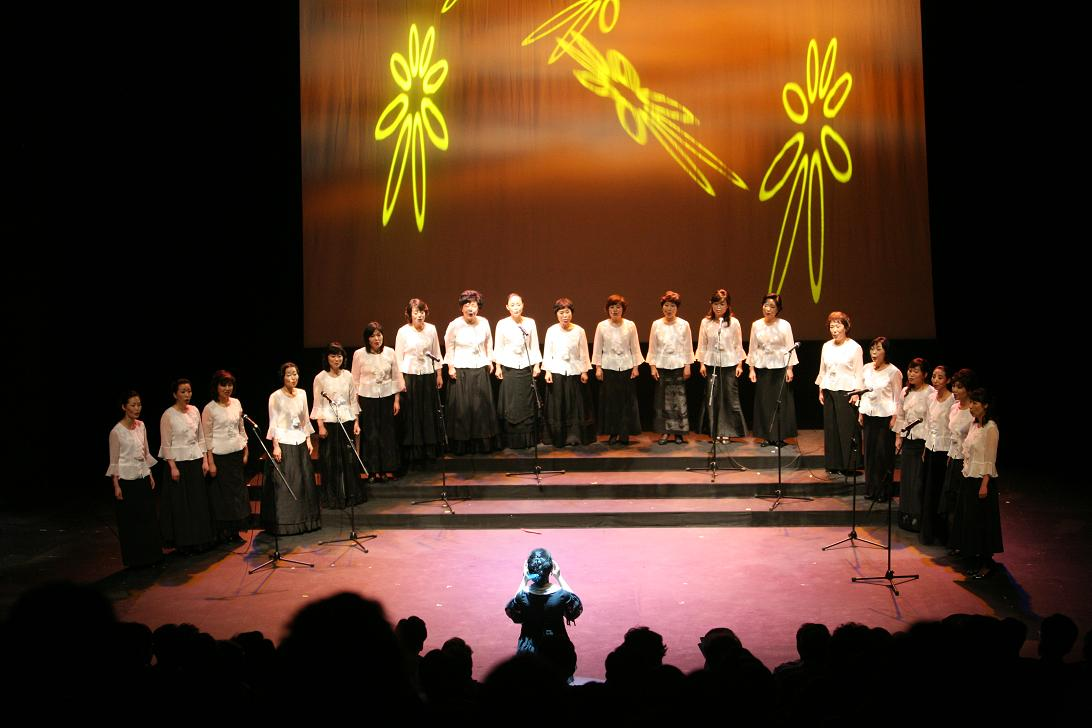
Performance of the Jaeneung Poetry Recitation Association

Si-nangsong-ga refers to a Korean poetry recitation expert. Usually, it is awarded to the winner of the contest. Currently, the title Si-nangsong-ga, which is certified by the Society of Korean Poets, is awarded only to the winner of the JEI poetry recitation contest.

In South Korea, groups of organizations centering around these Si-nangsong-ga are conducting poetry recitation activities. Currently, the largest group of Si-nangsong-ga in South Korea is the Jaeneung Poetry Recitation Association.

== List of poetry recitation contests ==
- JEI Poetry Recitation Contest (founded 1991): hosted jointly by the Society of Korean Poets & JEI Corporation
- Geoje Art Festival poetry recitation contest (founded 1994): hosted by the Geoje branch of the Korea Federation of Arts and Culture Organizations
- National Youth and Adult Poetry Recitation Contest (founded 1999): hosted by the Poem Reciter Association of Korea

== See also ==
- Poetry reading
- Honorary Poets
