= JEI Learning =

JEI Learning Center

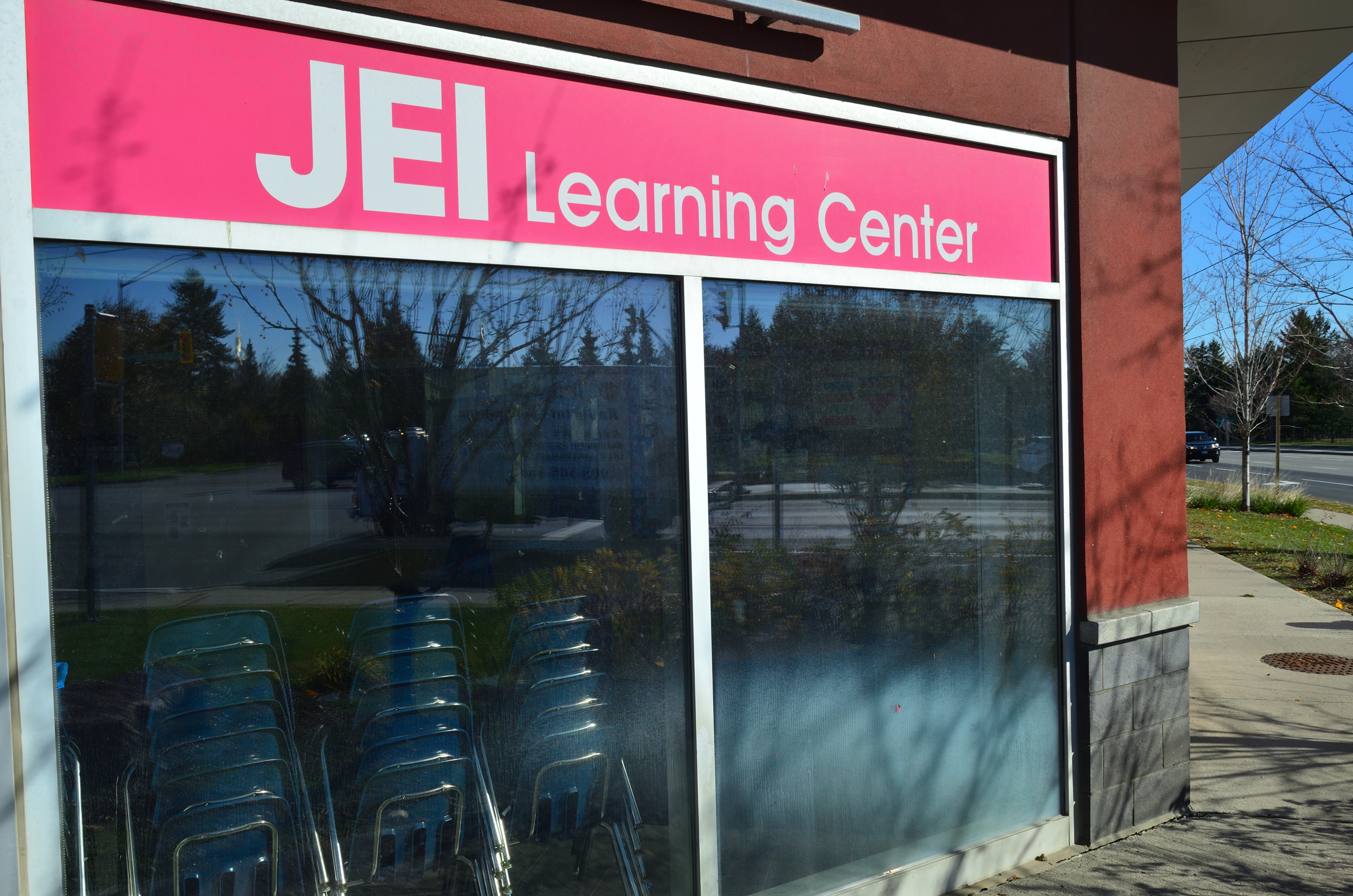
- JEI Learning Center in North America
- Company type: Private
- Industry: Education
- Founded: 1977
- Headquarters: Seoul, Korea (Global HQ); Los Angeles, CA (North America HQ)
- Products: JEI Math; JEI Problem Solving Math; JEI English; JEI Reading & Writing; JEI Brain Safari
- Website: us.jeilearning.com

JEI Learning Center or JEI Education is a company that runs tutoring centers for students aged four to fourteen, covering subjects such as reading and mathematics. There are typically five or fewer students per session, though the students do not necessarily learn the same lesson. Some learning centres offer 1 to 1 classes with the teacher coming to the student's home. The curriculum offered by JEI Self-Learning Method leans heavily on workbooks. It is designed to help pre-kindergarten to 9th grade students learn math and language concepts step-by-step, aligned with Common Core State Standards. JEI Learning Center provides a diagnostic test and track record system that pinpoints fundamental strengths and weaknesses in subject comprehension.

== History ==
The JEI Learning Center was established in 1977 by Sung Hoon Park in Seoul, Korea. Sung Hoon Park and a team of education researchers developed the JEI Self Learning Method for students seeking supplementary education in mathematics and language concepts. In 1992, Sung Hoon Park brought the JEI Method to the United States, Canada, the UAE, Hong Kong, China, Australia, and New Zealand. The company has over 500 locations worldwide.

== Programs ==
=== JEI Math ===
JEI Math offers a comprehensive program for pre-K through 9th grade. There are approximately 36 weekly workbooks per grade level, and each weekly workbook consists of 16 pages. At the end of each weekly workbook is an interim test on the material learnt throughout the week. JEI Math curriculum is aligned with Common Core State Standards.

=== JEI English ===
JEI English is designed to build a strong foundation in grammar, vocabulary, and reading skills. Curriculum is aligned to the National Council of Teachers of English (NCTE) Standards.

=== JEI Reading & Writing ===
JEI Reading & Writing is a literature-based program focused on comprehension as well as writing. Accompanied with full novel reading list, the curriculum is targeted for advanced level students or for those needing an extra challenge.

=== JEI Problem Solving Math ===
JEI Problem Solving Math develops critical and analytical skills, with math problems presented in styles similar to those found in Math Olympiad. Curriculum focuses on word problems and critical thinking-related questions.

=== Brain Safari ===
Brain Safari strengthens logical and analytical skills, enhances creativity and memory proficiency, and increase overall intelligence by focusing on the 9 different learning domains of critical thinking.

== Diagnostic System ==
First, the student takes JEI's diagnostic test appropriate to student's level which is determined after teacher interacts with the student, which then JEI's diagnostic system comprehensively analyses each student's test results and assigns them an individualized learning program. JEI Learning Center provides the Individual Progress Prescription Report (IPPR), a detailed computer analysis of a student's learning needs and performance during the curriculum.

== Structure ==
JEI lessons typically take place after school or on weekends. Students attend classes once weekly.

== Awards ==
In 2014, Entrepreneur and Business Insider ranked JEI Learning Center #191 in the Franchise 500® and #119 in America's Top Global. In 2015, JEI Learning Center ranked #198 in the Franchise 500® and #45 in America's Top Global.

== See also ==
- Storefront school
