= Kim Namjo =

South Korean poet (1927–2023)

- 김남조
- Born: 25 September 1927; Daegu, Korea, Empire of Japan
- Died: 10 October 2023 (aged 96)
- Citizenship: South Korean
- Writing career
- Language: Korean

Korean name
- Hangul: 김남조
- Hanja: 金南祚
- RR: Gim Namjo
- MR: Kim Namjo

Kim Namjo (Korean: 김남조; 25 September 1927 – 10 October 2023) was a South Korean poet.

== Biography ==
Kim Namjo was born on 25 September 1927, in Daegu, Korea, Empire of Japan. She attended a girls' school in Kyushu, Japan, and graduated from Seoul National University's College of Education in 1951 with a degree in Korean Language Education. Kim made her official literary debut in 1950 while still in college, publishing the poetry collection Constellations. Kim taught at Masan High School and Ewha Girls' High School. She became a professor at Sookmyung Women's University in 1954 and was a professor emerita there. Kim served as chairperson of Society of Korean Poets and was later a member of the Korean Academy of Arts.

Kim died on 10 October 2023, at the age of 96.

== Work ==
Kim Namjo's poetry features a dynamic use of sensual language and vibrant imagery to portray the subtlety of human emotions. Kim's work follows in the tradition of Mo Yunsuk and Noh Cheonmyeong. Kim's main theme was love, but not simply the love shared by a man and woman, but also the love shared between a human and the "Absolute Being.

The poems in her first poetry collection, Life (Moksum), offer both an affirmation of humanity and a passion for the vitality of life. These poems also present a harmonious balance between Catholic piety and an ardent human voice. The poems in Kim's second collection, Naadeuui hyangyu, and third collection place an increasingly heightened emphasis on religious faith, focusing much attention on the exploration of Christian humanism and ethics. Her later poems discard passion for restraint and perseverance as part of an ongoing religious self-examination. In the collection Winter Ocean (Gyeoul Bada), the poet describes a world in which human emotions have attained absolute purity.

== Works in translation ==
- Selected Poems of Kim Namjo – English (Kim Namjo Siseon), translated by David R. McCann and Hyunjae Yee Sallee
- Windtaufe – German (Baram serye)
- Песни сегодняшнего и завтрашнего дня – Russian (Oneul geurigo naeil-ui norae)
- Antologia poética – Spanish (Kim Namjo Siseonjib)
- Rain, Sky, Wind, Port - English (Codhill Press, 2014), translated by Hillel Schwartz and Sunny Jung

== Works in Korean (partial) ==
- Life (정념의 기)
- A Heart's Flag (정념의 기)
- Love's Cursive (사랑초서)
- Music of the Pine Woods (송림의 음악)
- For a While, and Forever (잠시, 그리고 영원히)
- The Poems of Kim Namjo (김남조 시집)
- The Complete Poems of Kim Namjo (김남조 시전집)

== Awards ==
Kim received the following awards:

- First Annual Association of Free Literature Prize (1958)
- May Literary Prize (1963)
- Prize for Poetry of Korean Poets Association (1974)
- The Culture and Arts Prize of the Republic of Korea (1988)
- Seoul City Cultural Award (1990)
- Samil Prize (1991)
- National Order of Merit (1993)
- Proud Artist Award - Contributions (2000)
- Manhae Prize (2007)
- Jeong Jiyong Literature Prize (2017)

== See also ==
- Korean literature
- List of Korean-language poets
- Society of Korean Poets
