= O Seyeong =

South Korean poet, critic, and educator (born 1942)

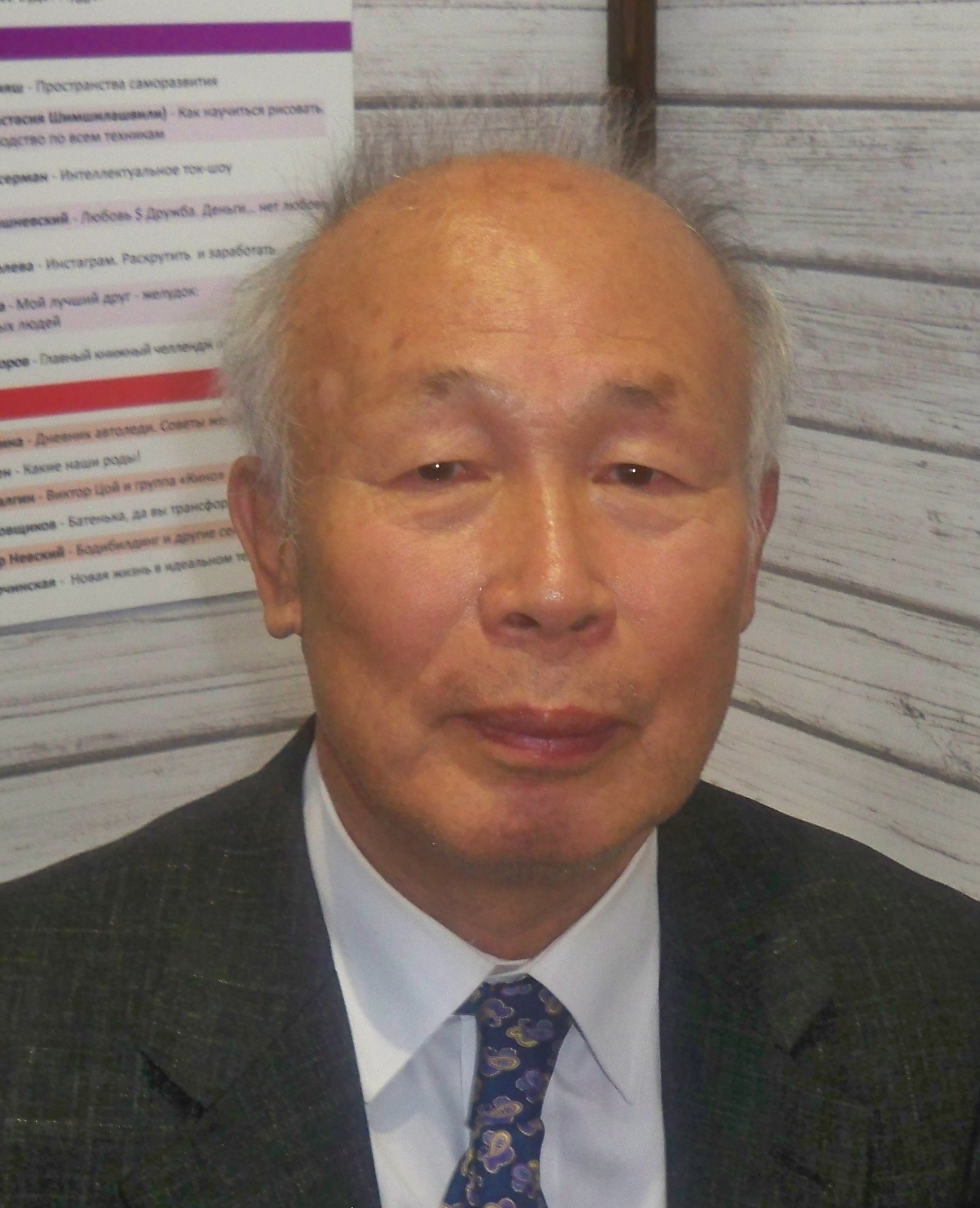
- O Seyeong at the Moscow International book fair, 2017
- Born: O Seyeong; 2 May 1942 (age 84); Yeonggwang County, Zenranan Province, Korea, Empire of Japan
- Education: Seoul National University
- Occupation: Writer
- Writing career
- Genre: Poetry

- O Seyeong
- Hangul: 오세영
- Hanja: 吳世榮
- RR: O Seyeong
- MR: O Seyŏng

O Seyeong (Korean: 오세영, born 2 May 1942) is a South Korean poet, critic, educator, and professor at Seoul National University. He has been awarded the Korean Poets' Association Prize, the Nokwon Literary Award, the Cheong Chi-Yong Literature Prize, the Pyun-Woon Literary Prize, the Gong Cho Literary Award, and the Manhae Literature Prize in Poetry.

== Life ==
O Seyeong was born in Yeonggwang County, Zenranan Province, Korea, Empire of Japan in 1942. He graduated from Seoul National University, and became a high school language teacher. He started his literary career in 1968 by publishing in the literary magazine Hyundae Munhak. In 1970 he published his first poetry collection, Rebelling Light (반란하는 빛). In 1972 he was published in the literary magazine Hyundae Poetry. In 1974 he was appointed as a full-time lecturer at Chungnam National University, and graduated with a doctorate degree in Korean literature from Seoul National University in 1980. In 1982 he participated in the inaugural assembly of the Asian Poets' Association. In 1983 he published two collections of essays, The Lyrical Truth (서정적 진실) and Modern Poetry and Its Practical Criticism (현대시와 실천비평).

In 1987 O Seyeong was awarded the inaugural Sowol Poetry Prize, and was accepted into the IOWA International Writing Program. In 1994 he participated in the writing of a volume on literature as part of the Korean Studies Book Series, Lectures on Korean Literature, published by Story Brook University's Center for Korean Studies. In the same year he became a full professor at Seoul National University. He was a guest lecturer at the University of California, Berkeley in 1995, discussing Korean literature for the Department of East Asian Languages. He was awarded the Manhae Literature Prize in 2000, and published translated versions of two of his poetry collections in Germany. O Seyeong participated in the Berkeley Art Museum's 2006 poetry festival, Speak Pacific: 100 Years of Modern Korean Poetry, sponsored by U.C. Berkeley's Department of East Asian Languages.

O Seyeong's volume Night-Sky Checkerboard was translated into English in 2016, published in the United States and listed by the Chicago Review of Books as one of the twelve best poetry collections of 2016.

== Writing ==
O Seyeong's early works contained significant amounts of "deconstructive" poetry, leading him to be classified as a modernist poet. However, he did not simply stay fixed on linguistic experiments. He gradually became fascinated with Eastern philosophies, and based on that, he worked on lyrical depiction of humanity's existential agony. Through poetry, he shows eternity and infinity, which should be naturally sought after when one is in a state of namelessness. He attempts to show the proper way of life that people with enlightened sense of existence must strive for. 'Namelessness' is a Buddhist word that describes a state when the mind has not yet reached intrinsic enlightenment, but rather captured by desires and ego.

Today O Seyeong is described as a poet who has lyrical sense, philosophical intellect, and sophisticated linguistic awareness. He writes as he bores into the double-sidedness and hypocrisy of existence. One of his major works, Bird (새), depicts birds that soar into the sky toward the truth and freedom, but ultimately must fall, showing humanity's fateful burden. Like how if a poem flies higher, the distance back to the ground get further, this work contains the insight that though humans strive endlessly for the ideal, they are ultimately fatalistic beings that must return to the ground.

The Chicago Review of Books said that O Seyeong's "attention to detail, and his ability to shift back and forth between scopes both grand and minuscule, provide a sense that his poems are inextricably linked to something larger," noting that his poetry collections "work very much obsessed with existence, the building and destruction of nature, business, war, and industry. He unexpectedly examines merit, plays with worth, while lingering on the edge of past and present."

== Works ==
=== Poetry collections ===
- Rebelling Light (반란하는 빛, 1970)
- The Evening of the Darkest Day (가장 어두운 날 저녁에, 1982)
- The Soil of Contradiction (모순의 흙, 1985)
- Nameless Beginning of the Year (무명연시, 1986)
- The Burning Water (불타는 물, 1988)
- The Other Side of Love (사랑의 저쪽, 1990)
- Flowers Long for Stars (꽃들은 별을 우러르며 산다, 1990)
- Darkness Exists Even in God's Heaven (신의 하늘에도 어둠은 있다, 1991)
- Foolish Hegel! (어리석은 헤겔, 1994)
- The Tearful Shadow in the Sky (눈물에 어리는 하늘 그림자, 1994)
- Because You Are Not There (너 없음으로, 1997)
- American Psalms (아메리카시편, 1997)
- The Light of Death (적멸의 불빛, 2001)
- Wind's Shadow (바람의 그림자, 2009)
- Night-Sky Checkerboard (밤하늘의 바둑판, 2011)
- Wind's Sons (바람의 아들들, 2014)
- The Sound of Autumn Rain (가을 빗소리, 2016)

=== Research papers ===
- "Study on Romantic Korean Poetry." (한국낭만주의시 연구) Il Ji Sa, 1980.
- "Methodology for Cultural Studies." (문화연구방법론) I-uchulpansa, 1998.
- "Analytical Reading of Modern Korean Poetry." (한국현대시 분석적 읽기) Korea University Press, 1998.
- "Study on 20th-Century Korean Poetry." (20세기 한국시 연구) Saemoon Books, 1989.
- "Theories on Contemporary Korean Literature and Contemporary Poetry." (한국근대문학론과 근대시) Minumsa, 1996.
- "Study on Modern Korean Poets." (한국현대시인연구) Worin Publishing, 2003.
- "Theory of Literature." (문학과 그 이해) Kookhak, 2003.
- "Theory of 20th-Century Korean Poets." (20세기 한국시인론) Worin Publishing, 2005.
- "Writing Poetry." (시 쓰기의 발견) Seojeongsihak, 2013.
- "Theory of Poetry." (시론) Seojeongsihak, 2013.

=== Essay collections ===
- The Lyrical Truth (서정적 진실), Minjokmunhwasa, 1983.
- Modern Poetry and Its Practical Criticism (현대시와 실천비평), I-uchulpansa, 1983.
- Where Is Modern Poetry Now? (한국현대시의 행방), Jongro Books, 1988.
- Creativity and Logic (상상력과 논리), Minumsa, 1991.
- The Age of Revolution and Modern Korean Poetry (변혁기와 한국 현대시), Saemi, 1996.

=== Works in translation ===
- Тысячелетний сон (Russian)
- Night-Sky Checkerboard (English)
- Songe de la falaise : Suivi d'un choix de poèmes (French)
- 詩集 時間の丸木舟 (Japanese)
- Světlo vyhasnutí (Czech)
- Flowers long for stars (English)
- アントニオ・コレア (Japanese)
- Buja's Diary (English)
- Más allá del amor (Spanish)
- Sueños del barranco (Spanish)
- Gedichte jenseits der Liebe: Gefäß-Zyklus (German)
- Liebesgedichte eines Unwissenden (German)
- Das ferne Du (German)

== Awards ==
- 1983 Korean Poets' Association Prize
- 1984 Nokwon Literary Award for Literary Criticism
- 1986 Sowol Poetry Prize
- 1992 Cheong Chi-yong Literature Prize
- 1992 Pyun-Woon Literary Prize for Literary Criticism
- 2000 Manhae Prize
- 2012 Mogwol Literature Prize
