= Kyobo Life Insurance =

South Korean insurance company

Kyobo Life Insurance Co., Ltd.

- Kyobo Life Insurance Building
- Native name: 교보생명보험 주식회사
- Formerly: Daehan Kyoyuk Insurance
- Industry: Financial services
- Founded: 7 August 1958; 68 years ago
- Founder: Shin Yong-ho
- Headquarters: Seoul, South Korea
- Key people: Shin Chang-jae (Chairman)
- Website: www.kyobo.co.kr

Kyobo Life Insurance Co., Ltd. (Korean: 교보생명보험 주식회사; Hanja: 敎保生命保險 株式會社; RR: Gyobo Saengmyeong Boheom Jusik Hoesa) is a South Korean life insurance company headquartered in Seoul, South Korea, formerly known as Daehan Kyoyuk Insurance (대한교육보험; 大韓敎育保險; Taehan Kyoyukbohŏm). Kyobo Life is one of the big 3 life insurance companies in South Korea.

The company was founded in 1958 by Shin Yong-ho, and his son Shin Chang-jae has been chairman and CEO since 2000.

== See also ==
- Kyobo Book Center
