= Lee Hyeonggi =

- Born: January 6, 1933
- Died: February 2, 2005 (aged 72)
- Citizenship: South Korean
- Education: B.A.
- Alma mater: Dongguk University
- Writing career
- Language: Korean

Korean name
- Hangul: 이형기
- Hanja: 李炯基
- RR: I Hyeonggi
- MR: I Hyŏnggi

Lee Hyeonggi (Korean: 이형기; January 6, 1933 – February 2, 2005) was a modern South Korean poet.

== Life ==
Lee Hyeonggi was born January 6, 1933, in Jinju South Gyeongsang Province, Korea, Empire of Japan. Lee attended Dongguk University, at the base of Namsan, from which he earned a B.A. in Buddhism in 1956. Lee worked as a reporter for the United Press, Seoul Shinmun, Daehan Ilbo, and as Editor in Chief and Editorial Writer for the Kukje Shinmun. Lee was also a professor of Korean at Dongguk University.

Lee died on February 2, 2005.

== Work ==
The poetic career of Lee Hyeonggi can be divided into three distinct periods. The first period, best represented by his poetry anthology Isolated Nature, reflects the maturing thoughts of a man who has come to realize the fundamental solitude of life and the emptiness of the world. The poems dating from this period are heavily infused with the sentiment of the futility of life. His poems, however, are not simple expressions of bitterness or anger, but are characterized instead, by a bold confrontation with this futility. The poet also removes himself worldly considerations and involvement, thus purifying himself from the transient waves of existence and unveiling aspects of transcendence in harmony with nature.

The second period of the poet's career includes works dating from the 1970s and after, which unburdens itself from the transparent and restrained emotion of his previous poetry to better express the poet's intense aestheticism. The central characteristics of this period are the desperate resistance shown by even strong men in the face of the death, and the essential futility of mankind magnified by such resistance, and the dramatic expression of human life through the negative influence of superficial vitality.

After the mid-1980s, his poetry displays a freedom of spirit that can withdraw and objectively examine the futility of life. He coolly examines the changes within reality and the horror of the world, with a calm composure that boldly accepts these observations.

== Works in Korean (Partial) ==
Collaborative Anthology

- Prayer Before the Sun Goes Down (Hae neom-eo gagi jeon-ui gido) with poets such as Lee Sangro and Lim Gwansik.

Poetry Collections

- Isolated Nature (Jeogmaggangsan)
- The Song of the Stone Pillow (Dolbegae-ui si)
- The Heart of a Balloon (Pungseon simjang).

Criticism

- The Logic of Sensitivity (Gamseong-ui nonli)
- A Reconsideration of Korean Literature (Hangugmunhag-ui banseong).

== Awards ==
- Korean Literary Men Association Prize in 1956
- Ministry of Culture and Education Literary Art Prize in 1966
- Korean Poets Association Prize in 1978
- Busan Culture Award in 1983
- Korean Literature Award in 1990
