= Park In-hwan (author) =

South Korean writer (1926–1956)

- Park in 1954
- Born: August 15, 1926; Inje, Japanese Korea
- Died: March 20, 1956 (aged 29); Seoul, South Korea
- Writing career
- Language: Korean

Korean name
- Hangul: 박인환
- Hanja: 朴寅煥
- RR: Bak Inhwan
- MR: Pak Inhwan

Park In-hwan (August 15, 1926 – March 20, 1956) was a Korean poet and author.

== Life ==
Park In-hwan was born in Inje, Gangwon-do, Korea during the period of Japanese rule. He graduated from Kyunggi High School in 1945 and entered Pyeongyang Medical School.(평양의전 平壤醫專). Once Korea was liberated from Japanese rule, he quit school and started a small bookstore named 'Mariseosa' in Jongno, Seoul. Park had been interested in poetry ever since his early teens and in 1946 published his first poem entitled "Street" (거리) in the Kukje Shinmun Newspaper. In 1949, he co-authored a poetry book titled 'New city and unison of citizens,' together with Kim Gyeong-rin (김경린 金璟麟) and Kim Su-yeong (김수영 金洙暎). This book put him in the spotlight and gave him a reputation as a modernist poet. Park was an active journalist in 1949 for the Kyunghyang Sinmun Daily and later became their war correspondent in 1951. In 1955, he traveled to the United States by ship and in the same year published the Park In-hwan Poetry Collection. These poems were known for their depiction of the Bohemian experience and propensity.

Park died in March 1956, at the age of 29. He died from heart failure after he drank in Myeongdong and came back home. One week before he died, he wrote a poem titled 'If times flow,' which became popular all over Korea.

== Work ==
The Korean Literature Translation Institute summarizes Park's contributions to Korean literature:

Park Inhwan’s poetry and his work can be described as continual surveillance of the phenomena of modernization; his is a body of work that strives to reflect the unintended consequences which civilization unleashes even as man is constantly evolving and progressing. His poetry captures the harsh realities of contemporary urbanization, the tragedy and bloodshed of international warfare, and a general sense of anomie and despair that is evoked in an environment of the temporary. However, Park’s poetry cannot be classified as unadulterated realism; with a few notable exceptions, much of his work is nuanced abstract acknowledgment of the foreign world, a plane that is on the periphery of contemporary reality and which provides an escape from the discontent that modernization breeds.

Park's first work began in reaction to the old school techniques, such as those of the "Blue Deer" (Cheongnok), a school of sentimentalism that celebrated the affinity between nature and man. Though there are no extant copies of his first major literary work, the coterie journal New Poetics (Sinsiron), which he published with fellow poets such as Kim Gyeongrim, Yang Byeongsik, Kim Suyeong, Lim Hogwon, and Kim Byeonguk. The general tone of the journal promoted the mission of the poet to observe and then re-construct the contemporary world with his words. His anthology, A New City and a Chorus of Citizens (Saeroun dosi wa simindeurui hapchang), further rejected the traditional sentimentalism of previous poets. The anthology, published in conjunction with Kim Gyeongrin and Kim Suyeong, initiated a revolutionary new school of literature that sought to create a new language through which to depict the burgeoning reality of urbanization. His work during the Korean War marked a significant shift in the tone of his work. As witness to the death and despair that was wreaked by the fighting, Park published poems such as "Signal Flare" (Sinhotan), "Going Home" (Gohyange gaseo), and "Problem" (Munjedeoneun geot), which expressed a profound sense of sorrow in the face of bloodshed, a sorrow that is not localized but rather a fundamental characteristic of the human condition.

Some of Park's other poetry, such as "Unfortunate God" (Bulhaenghan sin), "O black God" (Geomeun siniyeo), and "Final dialogue" (Choehuui hoehwa), are dark works expressing the discontent and the sense of hopelessness that are particular to the modern world. Park has been criticized, however, for not wholly confronting the despair expressed in his observations of contemporary society. With the exception of "To my baby daughter" (Eorin ttarege) and "Without tears" (Hanjulgi nunmuldo eopsi), Park is criticized for resorting to the fantastical and the foreign as means through which one can find a solution to the problems of modernity, rather than finding an answer in reality.

== Works in translation ==
- Puisi buat Rakyat Indonesia (한국 현대시선)

== Works in Korean (partial) ==
Collections of Poetry

- New Poetic Theory (1948)
- Chorus of the New City and Citizens (1955)
- Park In-hwan Poetry Collection (박인환선시집 朴寅煥選詩集, 1955)
- A Rocking Horse and a Lady (1976)
- The Collected Works of Park In-hwan (1986)

== See also ==
- Korean poetry
- Korean literature
- Gangwon
