= Oh Takbeon =

South Korean writer and critic (1943–2023)

- Born: 3 July 1943; Jecheon, Chūseinan-dō, Korea, Empire of Japan
- Died: 15 February 2023 (aged 79)
- Education: Korea University
- Writing career
- Language: Korean

Korean name
- Hangul: 오탁번
- Hanja: 吳鐸蕃
- RR: O Takbeon
- MR: O T'akpŏn

Oh Takbeon (Korean: 오탁번; 3 July 1943 – 15 February 2023) was a South Korean writer, poet, and critic.

== Life ==
Oh Takbeon was born 3 July 1943, in Jecheon, Chūseinan-dō, Korea, Empire of Japan. He attended Korea University, where he studied Korean literature and worked as a professor in the Department of Korean Education, also at Korea University.

Oh died on 15 February 2023, at the age of 79.

== Work ==
The Literature Translation Institute of Korea summarizes Oh's contributions to Korean literature:

The first work of his to be published was a children’s tale; “Cheori and His Father” (Cheoriwa abeoji) was awarded a prize in the New Year’s Literary Contest sponsored by the Dong-a Ilbo in 1966. The value of innocence associated with childhood has remained a persistent concern in Oh Takbeon’s work. The idealization of the natural state of grace in which a child lives heightens the sense of loss that must accompany the onset of adulthood; Oh Takbeon’s adult characters struggle against the depraved reality through impulsive behavior that flouts conventional norms or by embracing the healing power of maternal imagination. With concise and witty sentences, concrete imagery, and spirited tone characteristic of children’s tales, Oh Takbeon mirrors the ingenuousness of a child in his writing style as well.

Oh was known both for fiction and poetry, having won Korean awards in both arenas. He authored several works of criticism concerned with Modern Korean poetry and literary history.

== Works in Korean (partial) ==
Poems

- This Resplendent, Silvery Morning (Suneuni binnaneun i achim, 1967)
- The Land of Execution (Cheohyeongui ttang, 1967)
- Snowfall (Gangseol, 1969)
- Petty Official" (Hagwan, 1983)

Fiction

- Gadeung Temple (Gadeungsa, 1970)
- The Wedding (Hollye, 1971)
- Returning Home (Guiro, 1972)
- How to Turn the Key (Yeolsoereul dollineun beop, 1981)
- The Tomb of Language (Eoneoui myoji, 1983)
- Moon-Welcoming Flower (Dalmaji kkot, 1984)

== Awards ==
- Joongang Literary Award (1967)
- Hanguk Munhak Literary Award (1987)
- Dongseo Literary Award (1994)
- Korean Poets Association Award (2003)
- Kim Sakkat Literature Award (2010)
