= Kim Kwang-lim =

South Korean poet (1929–2024)

Kwang-lim Kim
- Born: 21 September 1929; Wonsan, Kankyōnan Province, Korea, Empire of Japan
- Died: 9 June 2024 (aged 94)

Korean name
- Hangul: 김광림
- Hanja: 金光林
- RR: Gim Gwangrim
- MR: Kim Kwangnim

Kim Kwang-lim (Korean: 김광림; 21 September 1929 – 9 June 2024) was a South Korean early-modern poet.

== Biography ==
Kim was born on 21 September 1929, in Wonsan, Kankyōnan Province, Korea, Empire of Japan. Kim graduated from Korea University with a degree in Korean literature and later served as a professor at Jangan College and as the president of the Society of Korean Poets.

Kim died on 9 June 2024, at the age of 94.

== Work ==
The early poems of Kim Kwang-lim, included in his poetry collection Sorrow of a Grafted Tree (Sangsimhaneun jeommok) published by Baekjasa in 1959, overflow with the raw pain and suffering endured as a result of the Korean War. After the armistice in 1953, Kim's poems evince a diminished attention to issues pertaining to the war or Korean society in general and a growing interest in describing phenomena, with a focus on visual imagery.

Following his second collection of poems, Bright Shadow of an Image (Simsangui balgeun geurimja ), published by Joongang Culture Company (Joongang munhwasa) in 1962, Kim's artistic endeavor focused on the conception of a perfect, pure image. Kim thus eliminated all abstraction from his works, and sought an aesthetic that would isolate the image and remove all external semantic associations from it.

In the 1970s, Kim's poetry began to incorporate elements of Seon Buddhism, crowning the poet's endeavor to eliminate prosaic elements and abstraction from his poetry and to isolate the bare, unobstructed image. Kim's fixation on realizing the perfect poetic depiction of an image and establishing a profound awareness of this image elevated his work and language to a new, transcendental plane. In fact, underlying his works is the development of a new poetic sensibility vis-a-vis external phenomena, the realization of the lucidity of language, and the creation of poetic expression through the construction of the image. Following the publication of Bird Made of Language (Eoneoro mandeun sae) in 1979, Kim rekindled his efforts to breach the limits of language and to stretch it to its extremes, through radical simplification of language by self-restraint akin to the practices of Seon or Zen Buddhism.

Kim was essentially an imagist and his poems often seem like quick glimpses of life in which human concern meets with tight poetic control. While Kim was cognizant of the role of materialism in modern society, his poetry seeks to overcome this with tolerance and forgiveness.

== Works in Korean (Partial) ==
Collections of Poetry

- Sorrow of a Grafted Tree (Sangsimhaneun jeommok 1959)
- Bright Shadow of an Image (Simsangui balgeun geurimja 1962)
- Casting a Net in the Morning (Ojeonui tumang 1965)
- Fall of the Crane (Hagui churak 1971)
- Agony (Galdeung 1973)
- Mid-Winter Stroll (Hangyeourui sanchaek 1976)
- Bird Made of Language (Eoneoro mandeun sae 1979)
- The Top Cries when it Stands (Baro seol ttae paengi-neun unda 1982)
- Heavenly Flower (Cheonsangui kkot 1985)
- A Stupid Man (Meongcheonghan sanae 1988)
- In the Desert of Language (Marui samageseo 1989)
- Straightforward (Gotigotdaero 1993)
- Midday Lantern (Daenat-ui deungbul 1996)
- Sick Man (Alh-neun sanae 1998)
- A Lost Hoop (Notchin gulleongsoe 2001)

== Awards ==
- Korean Poets' Association Prize (1966)
- Republic of Korea Literature Prize (1966)

== See also ==
- Korean Literature
- List of Korean-language poets
- Society of Korean Poets
