= Kim Su-yeong =

Korean writer (1921–1968)

Kim Suyeong
- Born: November 27, 1921; Keijō, Korea, Empire of Japan
- Died: June 16, 1968; Seoul, South Korea
- Occupation: Poet
- Writing career
- Language: Korean

Korean name
- Hangul: 김수영
- Hanja: 金洙暎
- RR: Gim Suyeong
- MR: Kim Suyŏng

Kim Suyeong (Korean: 김수영; November 27, 1921 – June 16, 1968) was a Korean poet.

== Biography ==
Kim Soo-young was a Korean poet and translator whose poetry explored love and freedom as poetic and political ideals. Kim was born in Gwancheol-dong, Seoul on November 27, 1921. After graduating from the Sunrin Commercial High School, Kim departed for Japan to study at the Tokyo University of Commerce. He returned to Korea in 1943 to avoid the conscription of student soldiers in Japan. A year later, he moved to Jilin, Manchuria with his family and taught at the Jilin High School. At this time, Kim was also heavily involved in theatre work. Upon Korea's Independence in 1945, Kim returned to Seoul to work as interpreter and eventually transferred to the Department of English at Yonhui University as a senior though he eventually turned down this position. He was conscripted by the North Korean Army and became a prisoner of war. He was eventually released to the Geojedo Island Prisoner-of-War Camp in 1952, where he worked as an interpreter for the director of the hospital, and for the U.S 8th Army. Kim, who taught English at Sunrin Commercial High School later in life, began working for Weekly Pacific (Jugan taepyeongyang) and Pyeonghwa Newspaper after returning to Seoul in 1954. The following year, Kim retired from his work and began a poultry farming operation from his home, in order to devote himself to poetry, translation and literary criticism. He published a poetry collection entitled Play of the Moon (Dallaraui Jangnan), for which he received the first Poet's Association Award. He died on June 16, 1968, after being struck by a bus while in Seoul.

== Work ==
Kim's literary orientation became clear when he led other young Korean poets in "The Second Half," a group dedicated to redirecting Korean poetry away from the traditionalism and lyricism of the early 1950s, and confronting social concerns by using language in a new way. Among the innovations were the use of surrealism, abstraction, prose, slang and profanity in Kim's poems. Kim's early poems were in a Modernist style, though later he changed directions, using everyday language in addressing social issues. Many are political, either overtly or by hidden implication.

According to the scholar of Korean literature, Brother Anthony of Taizé, Kim's significance and impact only really took place after his death. He only published one volume of poetry (in 1959). Shortly before his death, he wrote a theoretical article which sparked a lively debate.

Perhaps his best-known poem is "Grass". The Kim Soo-young Contemporary Poetry Award is named in his honor.

== Publications ==
- Dalnara-ui jangnan (A Game Played in the Moon), published in 1959, was the only book of poetry he produced in his lifetime.
- The Complete Works of Kim Su-young, Vol.1 (Poems). Minumsa Publishing Group 2003, 394p, ISBN 9788937407147.

=== Translated works ===
- Kim Su-yeong (1995). The Great Root 거대한 뿌리. Minumasa Publishing Co., Ltd. ISBN 89-374-0601-2.
- Kim Soo-Young (2005) Jenseits des Rausches. Gedichte.

(translated by Kang Yeo-Kyu and Uwe Kolbe) Edition Peperkorn: Thunum.

- Kim Soo-Young (2001) Der Wächter der Wolke: ausgewählte Gedichte. (translated by Kim Miy-He and Sylvia Bräsel) Edition Peperkorn: Thunum.
- Brother Anthony <of Taizé>, translator and editor (2001) Variations: Three Korean Poets. Cornell East Asia series; 110.

== Works in Korean (Partial) ==
- Grass (poet)
- One day while leaving the old palace
- waterfall

== Awards ==
- The Society of Korean Poets Award for Poetry, 1958 (first recipient)
- The Kim Suyeong Literary Award was established 1981 in his honor
- In 2007, he was listed by the Korean Poets' Association among the ten most important modern Korean poets.

== See also ==
- Korean literature

== Bibliography ==
- Variations: Three Korean Poets - Kim Su-Young, Shin Kyong-Nim, Lee Si-Young. Translated by Brother Anthony of Taizé and Young-Moo Kim. Cornell East Asia Series, No. 110. 2001 Bilingual CEAS Edition, 328 pages. 1-885445-10-5.
- Kim Su-Yong, Cent poèmes, translated into French and introduced and annotated by Kim Bona; introduction by Laurent Grisel; preface by Jean-Paul Michel. William Blake & Co. Edit., 2000. 192 pp. ISBN 2-84103-095-4.
- Paik Nak-chung, "The Poetry of Kim Su-yong; The Living Kim Su-yong," Korea Journal, winter 1999.
