= Devosia geojensis =

Scientific classification
- Domain: Bacteria
- Kingdom: Pseudomonadati
- Phylum: Pseudomonadota
- Class: Alphaproteobacteria
- Order: Hyphomicrobiales
- Family: Devosiaceae
- Genus: Devosia
- Species: D. geojensis

Binomial name
- Devosia geojensis Ryu et al. 2008

Type strain
- BD-c194, DSM 19414, KCTC 22082

Species of bacterium

Devosia geojensis is a Gram-negative, aerobic, motile bacteria from the genus of Devosia with a single polar flagella which was isolated from diesel-contaminated soil in Geoje in the Republic of Korea.
