= Paradevosia shaoguanensis =

Scientific classification
- Domain: Bacteria
- Kingdom: Pseudomonadati
- Phylum: Pseudomonadota
- Class: Alphaproteobacteria
- Order: Hyphomicrobiales
- Family: Devosiaceae
- Genus: Paradevosia
- Species: P. shaoguanensis

Binomial name
- Paradevosia shaoguanensis Geng et al. 2015

Type strain
- CGMCC 1.12430, J5-3, LMG 27409

Species of bacterium

Paradevosia shaoguanensis is a Gram-negative, rod-shaped and aerobic bacteria from the family of Paradevosia with a single polar flagellum which has been isolated from coking wastewater in China.
