= Devosia subaequoris =

Scientific classification
- Domain: Bacteria
- Kingdom: Pseudomonadati
- Phylum: Pseudomonadota
- Class: Alphaproteobacteria
- Order: Hyphomicrobiales
- Family: Devosiaceae
- Genus: Devosia
- Species: D. subaequoris

Binomial name
- Devosia subaequoris Lee 2007

Type strain
- HST3-14, JCM 14206, KCTC 12772

Species of bacterium

Devosia subaequoris is a Gram-negative, oxidase- and catalase-positive, non-spore-forming, motile bacteria from the genus of Devosia which was isolated from a sediment sample from the Hwasun Beach in Jeju in the Republic of Korea.
