= Devosia psychrophila =

Scientific classification
- Domain: Bacteria
- Kingdom: Pseudomonadati
- Phylum: Pseudomonadota
- Class: Alphaproteobacteria
- Order: Hyphomicrobiales
- Family: Devosiaceae
- Genus: Devosia
- Species: D. psychrophila

Binomial name
- Devosia psychrophila Zhang et al. 2012

Type strain
- CGMCC 1.10210, CIP 110130, Cr7-05, DSM 22950

Species of bacterium

Devosia psychrophila is a psychrophilic, aerobic, Gram-negative, rod-shaped bacteria from the genus of Devosia which was isolated from the Pitztaler Jöchl glacier in the Oetztaler Alps in Tyrol in Austria.
