= Devosia enhydra =

Scientific classification
- Domain: Bacteria
- Kingdom: Pseudomonadati
- Phylum: Pseudomonadota
- Class: Alphaproteobacteria
- Order: Hyphomicrobiales
- Family: Devosiaceae
- Genus: Devosia
- Species: D. enhydra

Binomial name
- Devosia enhydra (Staley 1968) Park et al. 2016

Type strain
- ATCC 23634, JCM 21106, NBRC 102409

Synonyms
- Prosthecomicrobium enhydrum

Species of bacterium

Devosia enhydra is a bacterium from the genus of Devosia.
