= Devosia insulae =

Scientific classification
- Domain: Bacteria
- Kingdom: Pseudomonadati
- Phylum: Pseudomonadota
- Class: Alphaproteobacteria
- Order: Hyphomicrobiales
- Family: Devosiaceae
- Genus: Devosia
- Species: D. insulae

Binomial name
- Devosia insulae Yoon et al. 2007

Type strain
- DS-56, DSM 17955, KCTC 12821

Synonyms
- Pseudodevosia insulae

Species of bacterium

Devosia insulae is a Gram-negative, non-spore-forming motile bacteria from the genus of Devosia with a single flagellum. It was first isolated from soil samples collected in Dokdo, in the Republic of Korea.
