= Devosia epidermidihirudinis =

Scientific classification
- Domain: Bacteria
- Kingdom: Pseudomonadati
- Phylum: Pseudomonadota
- Class: Alphaproteobacteria
- Order: Hyphomicrobiales
- Family: Devosiaceae
- Genus: Devosia
- Species: D. epidermidihirudinis

Binomial name
- Devosia epidermidihirudinis Galatis et al. 2013

Type strain
- CCM 8398, CIP 110375, E84, LMG 26909

Species of bacterium

Devosia epidermidihirudinis is a Gram-negative, rod-shaped bacteria from the genus of Devosia.
