= Cucumibacter marinus =

Scientific classification
- Domain: Bacteria
- Kingdom: Pseudomonadati
- Phylum: Pseudomonadota
- Class: Alphaproteobacteria
- Order: Hyphomicrobiales
- Family: Devosiaceae
- Genus: Cucumibacter
- Species: C. marinus

Binomial name
- Cucumibacter marinus Hwang and Cho 2008

Type strain
- CL-GR60, DSM 18995, KCCM 90027

Species of bacterium

Cucumibacter marinus is a Gram-negative, strictly aerobic, rod-shaped bacteria from the genus of Cucumibacter which was isolated from coastal seawater from the Sea of Japan from near the city Busan in Korea. Cucumibacter marinus is the only known species of this genus.
