= Devosia submarina =

Scientific classification
- Domain: Bacteria
- Kingdom: Pseudomonadati
- Phylum: Pseudomonadota
- Class: Alphaproteobacteria
- Order: Hyphomicrobiales
- Family: Devosiaceae
- Genus: Devosia
- Species: D. submarina

Binomial name
- Devosia submarina Romanenko et al. 2013

Type strain
- JCM 18935, KMM 9415, NRIC 0884

Species of bacterium

Devosia submarina is a Gram-negative, aerobic, motile bacterium in the genus Devosia which was isolated from the Sea of Japan.
