= Devosia ginsengisoli =

Scientific classification
- Domain: Bacteria
- Kingdom: Pseudomonadati
- Phylum: Pseudomonadota
- Class: Alphaproteobacteria
- Order: Hyphomicrobiales
- Family: Devosiaceae
- Genus: Devosia
- Species: D. ginsengisoli

Binomial name
- Devosia ginsengisoli Moreira, I.S., Castro, P.M.L.

Type strain
- Gsoil 326

Species of bacterium

Devosia ginsengisoli is a bacterium from the genus of Devosia.
