= Devosia mishustinii =

Scientific classification
- Domain: Bacteria
- Kingdom: Pseudomonadati
- Phylum: Pseudomonadota
- Class: Alphaproteobacteria
- Order: Hyphomicrobiales
- Family: Devosiaceae
- Genus: Devosia
- Species: D. mishustinii

Binomial name
- Devosia mishustinii (Vasil'eva et al. 2009) Park et al. 2016

Synonyms
- Prosthecomicrobium mishustinii, Vasilyevaea mishustinii, Vasilyevea mishustinii

Species of bacterium

Devosia mishustinii is a bacterium from the genus of Devosia.
