= Arsenicitalea aurantiaca =

Scientific classification
- Domain: Bacteria
- Kingdom: Pseudomonadati
- Phylum: Pseudomonadota
- Class: Alphaproteobacteria
- Order: Hyphomicrobiales
- Family: Devosiaceae
- Genus: Arsenicitalea
- Species: A. aurantiaca

Binomial name
- Arsenicitalea aurantiaca Mu et al. 2016

Type strain
- CCTCC AB 2014325, 42-50, KCTC 42835

Synonyms
- Arsenicitalea cugensis

Species of bacterium

Arsenicitalea aurantiaca is an arsenic-resistant bacteria from the family of Devosiaceae which has been isolated from high-arsenic sediments from the Jianghan Plain in China.
