= Devosia hwasunensis =

Scientific classification
- Domain: Bacteria
- Kingdom: Pseudomonadati
- Phylum: Pseudomonadota
- Class: Alphaproteobacteria
- Order: Hyphomicrobiales
- Family: Devosiaceae
- Genus: Devosia
- Species: D. hwasunensis

Binomial name
- Devosia hwasunensis Lee, J., Lee, D.W., Lee, S.D.

Species of bacterium

Devosia hwasunensis is a bacterium from the genus of Devosia.
