= Devosia confluentis =

Scientific classification
- Domain: Bacteria
- Kingdom: Pseudomonadati
- Phylum: Pseudomonadota
- Class: Alphaproteobacteria
- Order: Hyphomicrobiales
- Family: Devosiaceae
- Genus: Devosia
- Species: D. confluentis

Binomial name
- Devosia confluentis Park et al. 2016

Type strain
- HJR-2, KCTC 52211, NBRC 112271

Synonyms
- Devosia acticola

Species of bacterium

Devosia confluentis is a Gram-negative and aerobic bacteria from the genus of Devosia which has been isolated from the Sea of Japan (East Sea) on Korea.
