= Devosia terrae =

Scientific classification
- Domain: Bacteria
- Kingdom: Pseudomonadati
- Phylum: Pseudomonadota
- Class: Alphaproteobacteria
- Order: Hyphomicrobiales
- Family: Devosiaceae
- Genus: Devosia
- Species: D. terrae

Binomial name
- Devosia terrae Yang, D.-C

Type strain
- DCY11

Species of bacterium

Devosia terrae is a bacterium from the genus of Devosia.
