= Devosia euplotis =

"Candidatus Devosia euplotis"

Scientific classification (Candidatus)
- Domain: Bacteria
- Kingdom: Pseudomonadati
- Phylum: Pseudomonadota
- Class: Alphaproteobacteria
- Order: Hyphomicrobiales
- Family: Devosiaceae
- Genus: Devosia
- Species: "Ca. D.euplotis"

Binomial name
- "Candidatus Devosia euplotis" Vannini et al. 2004

Species of bacterium

"Candidatus Devosia euplotis" is an endosymbiont candidatus bacteria from the genus Devosia.
