= Devosia crocina =

Scientific classification
- Domain: Bacteria
- Kingdom: Pseudomonadati
- Phylum: Pseudomonadota
- Class: Alphaproteobacteria
- Order: Hyphomicrobiales
- Family: Devosiaceae
- Genus: Devosia
- Species: D. crocina

Binomial name
- Devosia crocina Verma et al. 2009

Type strain
- CCM 7425, IPL20, MTCC 8590

Species of bacterium

Devosia crocina is a Gram-negative, aerobic, non-spore-forming motile bacteria from the genus of Devosia with a single polar flagellum.
