= Devosia limi =

Scientific classification
- Domain: Bacteria
- Kingdom: Pseudomonadati
- Phylum: Pseudomonadota
- Class: Alphaproteobacteria
- Order: Hyphomicrobiales
- Family: Devosiaceae
- Genus: Devosia
- Species: D. limi

Binomial name
- Devosia limi Vanparys et al. 2005

Type strain
- ABILEt1, CIP 109005, DSM 17137, LMG 22951, R-21940

Species of bacterium

Devosia limi is a Gram-negative, non-spore-forming, rod-shaped bacteria from the genus of Devosia which was isolated from commercial nitrifying inoculum in Belgium.
