= Devosia soli =

Scientific classification
- Domain: Bacteria
- Kingdom: Pseudomonadati
- Phylum: Pseudomonadota
- Class: Alphaproteobacteria
- Order: Hyphomicrobiales
- Family: Devosiaceae
- Genus: Devosia
- Species: D. soli

Binomial name
- Devosia soli Yoo et al. 2006

Type strain
- DSM 17780, GH2-, KACC 11509

Species of bacterium

Devosia soli is a Gram-negative, obligately aerobic, non-spore-forming, rod-shaped bacteria from the genus of Devosia which was isolated from greenhouse soil where lettuce (Lactuca sativa) grew, in the Daejeon City in the Republic of Korea.
