= Devosia honganensis =

Scientific classification
- Domain: Bacteria
- Kingdom: Pseudomonadati
- Phylum: Pseudomonadota
- Class: Alphaproteobacteria
- Order: Hyphomicrobiales
- Family: Devosiaceae
- Genus: Devosia
- Species: D. honganensis

Binomial name
- Devosia honganensis Zhang et al. 2016

Type strain
- ACCC 19737, NSL10, KCTC 42281

Species of bacterium

Devosia honganensis is a Gram-negative and strictly aerobic bacteria from the genus of Devosia which has been isolated from soil from a chemical factory in Hongan in China.
