= Devosia humi =

Scientific classification
- Domain: Bacteria
- Kingdom: Pseudomonadati
- Phylum: Pseudomonadota
- Class: Alphaproteobacteria
- Order: Hyphomicrobiales
- Family: Devosiaceae
- Genus: Devosia
- Species: D. humi

Binomial name
- Devosia humi Du et al. 2016

Type strain
- CCTCC AB 2015121, THG-MM1, KACC 18281

Species of bacterium

Devosia humi is a Gram-negative, aerobic, rod-shaped and non-motile bacteria from the genus of Devosia which has been isolated from soil near a pine (Pinus koraiensis) in Yongin on Korea.
