= Devosia glacialis =

Scientific classification
- Domain: Bacteria
- Kingdom: Pseudomonadati
- Phylum: Pseudomonadota
- Class: Alphaproteobacteria
- Order: Hyphomicrobiales
- Family: Devosiaceae
- Genus: Devosia
- Species: D. glacialis

Binomial name
- Devosia glacialis Zhang et al. 2012

Type strain
- CGMCC 1.10691, Cr4-44, LMG 26051

Species of bacterium

Devosia glacialis is a psychrophilic Gram-negative, aerobic, motile bacteria from the genus of Devosia with a polar flagella which was isolated from a glacier in the Hohe Tauern in Austria.
