= Riboflavinase =

Class of enzymes

Identifiers
- EC no.: 3.5.99.1
- CAS no.: 9024-79-7

Databases
- BRENDA: enzyme data
- ExPASy: NiceZyme view
- KEGG: enzyme entry
- MetaCyc: metabolic pathway
- Rhea: reactions
- PDB structures: RCSB PDB PDBe PDBsum
- Gene Ontology: AmiGO / QuickGO
Search
- PMC: articles
- PubMed: articles
- NCBI: proteins

Riboflavinase (EC 3.5.99.1) is an enzyme characterised from the soil bacterium, Pseudomonas riboflavina, that catalyzes the hydrolysis of riboflavin to ribitol and lumichrome:

riboflavin

H_{2}O

ribitol

+

lumichrome

The reaction is the first step in the catabolism of riboflavin.

This enzyme is a hydrolase, one acting on carbon-nitrogen bonds other than peptide bonds. The systematic name of this enzyme class is riboflavin hydrolase.
