= Devosia pacifica =

Scientific classification
- Domain: Bacteria
- Kingdom: Pseudomonadati
- Phylum: Pseudomonadota
- Class: Alphaproteobacteria
- Order: Hyphomicrobiales
- Family: Devosiaceae
- Genus: Devosia
- Species: D. pacifica

Binomial name
- Devosia pacifica Jia et al. 2014

Species of bacterium

Devosia pacifica is a Gram-negative, strictly aerobic, motile bacteria from the genus of Devosia with a single lateral flagellum which was isolated from sediments of the South China Sea.
