= Devosia chinhatensis =

Scientific classification
- Domain: Bacteria
- Kingdom: Pseudomonadati
- Phylum: Pseudomonadota
- Class: Alphaproteobacteria
- Order: Hyphomicrobiales
- Family: Devosiaceae
- Genus: Devosia
- Species: D. chinhatensis

Binomial name
- Devosia chinhatensis Kumar et al. 2008

Type strain
- CCM 7426, IPL18, MTCC 8593

Species of bacterium

Devosia chinhatensis is a Gram-negative, rod-shaped non-spore-forming motile bacteria from the genus of Devosia.
