= Maritalea porphyrae =

Scientific classification
- Domain: Bacteria
- Kingdom: Pseudomonadati
- Phylum: Pseudomonadota
- Class: Alphaproteobacteria
- Order: Hyphomicrobiales
- Family: Devosiaceae
- Genus: Maritalea
- Species: M. myrionectae

Binomial name
- Maritalea myrionectae Fukui et al. 2012

Type strain
- LCM-3, LMG 25872, NBRC 107169

Species of bacterium

Maritalea porphyrae is a Gram-negative, aerobic, motile bacterium from the genus Maritalea which was isolated from the alga Porphyra yezoensis.
