= Maritalea mobilis =

Scientific classification
- Domain: Bacteria
- Kingdom: Pseudomonadati
- Phylum: Pseudomonadota
- Class: Alphaproteobacteria
- Order: Hyphomicrobiales
- Family: Devosiaceae
- Genus: Maritalea
- Species: M. mobilis

Binomial name
- Maritalea mobilis Fukui et al. 2012

Type strain
- CGMCC 1.7002, E6, JCM 15144

Synonyms
- Zhangella mobilis

Species of bacterium

Maritalea mobilis is a Gram-negative, non-spore-forming bacterium from the genus Maritalea with a single polar flagellum, which was isolated from coastal seawater in Tianjin in China. Zhangella mobilis was transferred to Maritalea mobilis
