= Devosia yakushimensis =

Scientific classification
- Domain: Bacteria
- Kingdom: Pseudomonadati
- Phylum: Pseudomonadota
- Class: Alphaproteobacteria
- Order: Hyphomicrobiales
- Family: Devosiaceae
- Genus: Devosia
- Species: D. yakushimensis

Binomial name
- Devosia yakushimensis Bautista et al. 2010

Type strain
- DSM 21277, KCTC 22147, LMG 24299, NBRC 103855, Yak96B

Synonyms
- Devosia yakushimanensis

Species of bacterium

Devosia yakushimensis is a Gram-negative, obligately aerobic, motile bacteria from the genus of Devosia with a polar flagellum which was isolated from the plant Pueraria montana var. lobata in Japan.
