= New World (South Korean TV series) =

South Korean reality show

- Hangul: 신세계로부터
- Hanja: 新世界路부터
- RR: Sinsegyerobuteo
- MR: Sinsegyerobut'ŏ
- Genre: reality show
- Created by: Cho Hyo-jin; Go Min-seok
- Starring: Lee Seung-gi; Eun Ji-Won; Kim Hee-chul; Jo Bo-ah; Park Na-rae; Kai
- Country of origin: South Korea
- No. of seasons: 1
- No. of episodes: 8

Original release
- Network: Netflix
- Release: 20 November 2021

New World (Korean: 신세계로부터) is a reality show produced by Netflix starring Lee Seung-gi, Eun Ji-Won, Kim Hee-chul, Jo Bo-ah, Park Na-rae, Kai. It was released by Netflix on November 20, 2021.

== Synopsis ==
The show is a simulation variety show, portraying a utopia. Unpredictable events occur semi-regularly.

The members of the show will be facing various survival tasks, duels and twist. Six variety entertainers were invited to come to the imaginary world to realize their dreams, incorporating mysterious concepts that can only be found in movies or fairy tales.

== Filming ==
The crew was spotted filming the show starting from May 27, 2021, and it lasted for six days.

The filming took place on an island in Geoje, South Gyeongsang Province. The entire island is famous for its garden, Oedo Botania Park.

== Release ==
On September 25, 2021, the first teaser for the show was released along with the announcement that it will premiere on November 20.

== Reception ==
The series entered the Top 10 most viewed Netflix shows in 6 countries. It ranked 8th in South Korea, and 5th in Indonesia, Singapore and Malaysia. In addition, it ranked 6th in Vietnam and 7th in Hong Kong, proving the global popularity of 'From the New World'.

== Awards ==
Award ceremony	Year	Category	Nominee	Result	Ref.
Blue Dragon Series Awards	2022	Best New Male Entertainer	Kai	Won	
