= Pelagibacterium halotolerans =

Scientific classification
- Domain: Bacteria
- Kingdom: Pseudomonadati
- Phylum: Pseudomonadota
- Class: Alphaproteobacteria
- Order: Hyphomicrobiales
- Family: Devosiaceae
- Genus: Pelagibacterium
- Species: P. halotolerans

Binomial name
- Pelagibacterium halotolerans Xu et al. 2011

Type strain
- B2, CGMCC 1.7692, DSM 22347, JCM 15775

Species of bacterium

Pelagibacterium halotolerans is a Gram-negative, aerobic and motile bacterium from the genus of Pelagibacterium which has been isolated from sea water from the East China Sea in China.
