= Devosia albogilva =

Scientific classification
- Domain: Bacteria
- Kingdom: Pseudomonadati
- Phylum: Pseudomonadota
- Class: Alphaproteobacteria
- Order: Hyphomicrobiales
- Family: Devosiaceae
- Genus: Devosia
- Species: D. albogilva

Binomial name
- Devosia albogilva Verma et al. 2009

Type strain
- CCM 7427, IPL15, MTCC 8594

Species of bacterium

Devosia albogilva is a Gram-negative, aerobic, rod-shaped non-spore-forming bacteria from the genus of Devosia with a single polar flagellum which was isolated from a hexachlorocyclohexane dump site in India.
