= Maritalea myrionectae =

Scientific classification
- Domain: Bacteria
- Kingdom: Pseudomonadati
- Phylum: Pseudomonadota
- Class: Alphaproteobacteria
- Order: Hyphomicrobiales
- Family: Devosiaceae
- Genus: Maritalea
- Species: M. myrionectae

Binomial name
- Maritalea myrionectae Hwang et al. 2009

Type strain
- CL-SK30, DSM 19524, KCCM 90060

Species of bacterium

Maritalea myrionectae is a Gram-negative, rod-shaped, strictly aerobic bacterium from the genus Maritalea which was isolated from the protist Mesodinium rubrum in Kunsan in the Republic of Korea.
