= Methyloterrigena soli =

Scientific classification
- Domain: Bacteria
- Kingdom: Pseudomonadati
- Phylum: Pseudomonadota
- Class: Alphaproteobacteria
- Order: Hyphomicrobiales
- Family: Devosiaceae
- Genus: Methyloterrigena
- Species: M. soli

Binomial name
- Methyloterrigena soli Kim et al. 2016

Type strain
- M48, JCM 30821, KEMB 224-262

Species of bacterium

Methyloterrigena soli is a Gram-negative, aerobic, short rod-shaped, methanol-utilizing and motile bacteria from the family of Methyloterrigena which has been isolated from soil.
