= Pelagibacterium lixinzhangensis =

Scientific classification
- Domain: Bacteria
- Kingdom: Pseudomonadati
- Phylum: Pseudomonadota
- Class: Alphaproteobacteria
- Order: Hyphomicrobiales
- Family: Devosiaceae
- Genus: Pelagibacterium
- Species: P. lixinzhangensis

Binomial name
- Pelagibacterium lixinzhangensis

Species of bacterium

Pelagibacterium lixinzhangensis is a Gram-negative, non-spore-forming and rod shaped bacterium from the genus of Pelagibacterium which has been isolated from desert soil from the Xinjiang province in China.
