= List of botanical gardens in South Korea =

Botanical gardens in South Korea have collections consisting entirely of South Korea native and endemic species; most have a collection that include plants from around the world. There are botanical gardens and arboreta in all states and territories of South Korea, most are administered by local governments, some are privately owned.

- Chollipo Arboretum Foundation, Taean-gun, Chunchongnam-do (www.chollipo.org)
- Hwadam Botanic (화담숲), Gyeonggi-do
- Bunjae Artpia, Jeju-do
- Namsan Botanical Garden (남산식물원) open 1968–2006)
- Namsan Outdoor Botanical Garden (남산야외식물원), aka Namsan Botanical Garden
- Oedo
- Seoul Grand Park Botanical Garden
- Uchi Park, Gwangju
- Yeomiji Botanical Garden
