= Devosia neptuniae =

Scientific classification
- Domain: Bacteria
- Kingdom: Pseudomonadati
- Phylum: Pseudomonadota
- Class: Alphaproteobacteria
- Order: Hyphomicrobiales
- Family: Devosiaceae
- Genus: Devosia
- Species: D. neptuniae

Binomial name
- Devosia neptuniae Rivas et al. 2003

Species of bacterium

Devosia neptuniae is a nitrogen-fixing bacteria that nodulates Neptunia natans. It is Gram-negative, strictly aerobic short rod-shaped and motile by a subpolar flagellum. The type strain of D. neptuniae is LMG 21357^{T} (CECT 5650^{T}).
