= Youhaiella tibetensis =

Scientific classification
- Domain: Bacteria
- Kingdom: Pseudomonadati
- Phylum: Pseudomonadota
- Class: Alphaproteobacteria
- Order: Hyphomicrobiales
- Family: Devosiaceae
- Genus: Youhaiella
- Species: Y. tibetensis

Binomial name
- Youhaiella tibetensis Wang et al. 2015

Type strain
- CGMCC 1.12719, F4, JCM 19854

Species of bacterium

Youhaiella tibetensis is a gram-negative bacteria from the family of Youhaiella which has been isolated from the Qiangtang Basin permafrost in China.
