= Yu Chi-hwan =

Korean poet (1908–1967)

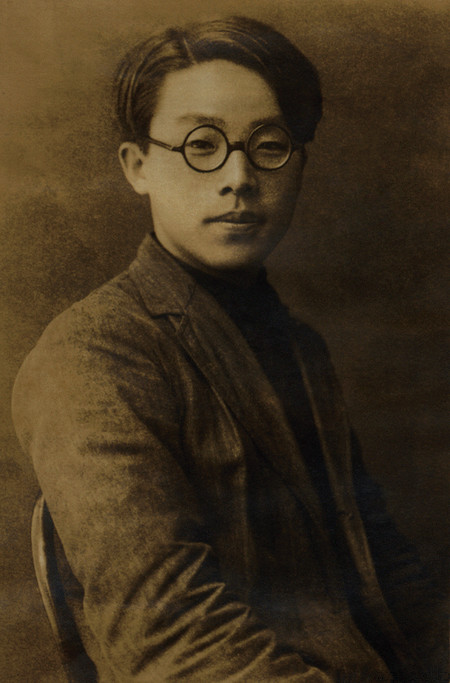
- Yu Chi-hwan in 1930
- Born: July 14, 1908; Geoje, South Gyeongsang Province, Joseon
- Died: February 13, 1967 (aged 58)
- Writing career
- Language: Korean

Korean name
- Hangul: 유치환
- Hanja: 柳致環
- RR: Yu Chihwan
- MR: Yu Ch'ihwan

Art name
- Hangul: 청마
- Hanja: 靑馬
- RR: Cheongma
- MR: Ch'ŏngma

Yu Chi-hwan (Korean: 유치환; 1908–1967), also known by his art name Cheongma (청마), was a leading twentieth-century Korean poet.

== Biography ==
Yu was born in South Gyeongsang Province. He published at least ten volumes of poetry. The poet collaborated with the occupation forces during Japanese colonial years. In 2005, a plaza with a bust of the poet and five monuments, each inscribed with a poem he wrote, were dedicated at the poet's tomb in Bangha-ri, Dundeok-myon, Geoje, South Gyeongsang Province.

Yu attended Toyoyama Middle School in Japan for four years, then returned to Korea to graduate from Dongrae High School. He entered the Humanities Division of Yonhi College (now Yonsei) in 1927 but withdrew after a year. In 1937 he managed the coterie journal Physiology (Saengni). In April 1940 he moved to Manchuria. He returned to Korea in June 1946, at which time he established the Tongyeong Cultural Association (Tongyeong munhwa hyeophoe) and joined several other groups as well and. In 1952 he joined the Poetry and Poetics (Siwa siron) circle in Daegu, and in 1955 he oversaw the publication of Green Barley (Cheongmaek), a journal produced by a circle of Gyeongsangnam-do writers. In 1957, he founded the Society of Korean Poets.

His awards include the Seoul Culture Award, Korean Academy of the Arts Distinguished Service Award (Yesurwon gongnosang), and Busan Culture Award. He died on February 13, 1967.

== Work ==
The Korea Literature Translation Institute describes Yu:

He began his career in poetry with the publication of "Tranquillity" (Jeongjeok) in Literary Arts Monthly (Munye wolgan) in December 1931. The publication of his first poetry collection, Poems of Yoo Chihwan (Cheongmasicho), in 1939 was followed by some ten further volumes of poetry, including The Chapter of Life (Saengmyeong-ui Seo), The Isle of Ulung (Ulleungdo), Journey of a Dragonfly (Cheongnyeong ilgi), as well as a book based on his experiences in the army during the Korean War, Together with the Infantry (Bobyeonggwa deobureo). How Happy to Have Loved(Saranghaesseumeuro haengbokhayeonnera), published posthumously, is a selection of two hundred love letters that he wrote to the sijo poet Lee Yeongdo. The poet’s works are colored by a will to overcome death and nothingness, the fundamental fate of human existence. This will is linked with the poet's own spiritual pilgrimage and thus has a variety of connotations in his poetry. On one hand, within the historical dimension represented by the extreme circumstances of the late years of Japanese Imperialism, there appears a masochistic rage and a savage will, while on the other we find, within the death predestined for humanity, a compassion and pathos for existence. These parallel portraits of the life-force and pathos are aptly illustrated in one of his best-known poems, “Flag” (Gitbal). The flag is the sentimental mind that, by simultaneously encountering compassion for humanity and a longing for a utopia, symbolized by the image of a blue sea, cannot in the end arrive at this Utopia. Because of his endeavor, based on this violent love of the life-force, to overcome by strong force of will the essence of nothingness, Yoo Chihwan is known as a poet of the "life-force" or "life" schools; and because of his poems' smooth recitation of sublime poetic themes, the critics see in his works a masculine poetic world rarely viewed in modern Korean poetry.

== Works in translation ==
- Imágenes del tiempo, translated by Kim Hyun Chang. Verbum: Madrid, 2005
- The Wind and the Waves: Four Modern Korean Poets; Translated and Introduced by Sung-Il Lee. Asian Humanities Press: Berkeley, Cal., 1989.
- Blue Stallion: Poems of Yu Chi-whan, translated by Sung-Il Lee. Homa & Sekey Books, 2011.
- Korean Literature Today: "Yu Chi-Hwan Poems: 'Evening Glow'" etc. Vol. 2. No. 2 P. 11;
- Yu Chi-Hwan Poems: 'Daffodil'" etc. Vol. 4. No. 4 P. 6; "Yu Chi-Hwan Poems: 'Cliff'" etc. Vol. 6. No. 1 P. 11

== Works in Korean (partial) ==
Poetry collections

- Poems of Yoo Chihwan (Cheongmasicho, 1939)
- The Chapter of Life (Saengmyeong-ui Seo)
- The Isle of Ulung (Ulleungdo)
- Journey of a Dragonfly (Cheongnyeong ilgi)

Assorted

- How Happy to Have Loved (Saranghaesseumeuro haengbokhayeonnera), published posthumously, is a selection of two hundred love letters that he wrote to the sijo poet Lee Yeongdo.

== Awards ==
- Seoul Culture Award
- Korean Academy of the Arts Distinguished Service Award (Yesurwon gongnosang)
- Busan Culture Award

== See also ==
- List of Korean-language poets
- Korean literature
- Korea under Japanese rule
- Society of Korean Poets
