= Pelagibacterium =

Scientific classification
- Domain: Bacteria
- Kingdom: Pseudomonadati
- Phylum: Pseudomonadota
- Class: Alphaproteobacteria
- Order: Hyphomicrobiales
- Family: Devosiaceae
- Genus: Pelagibacterium; Xu et al. 2011

Type species
- Pelagibacterium halotoleran

Species
- P. halotolerans P. lixinzhangensis P. luteolum P. nitratireducens

Genus of bacteria

Pelagibacterium is a bacteria genus from the family Hyphomicrobiaceae.
