= Youhaiella =

Scientific classification
- Domain: Bacteria
- Kingdom: Pseudomonadati
- Phylum: Pseudomonadota
- Class: Alphaproteobacteria
- Order: Hyphomicrobiales
- Family: Devosiaceae
- Genus: Youhaiella; Wang et al. 2015

Type species
- Youhaiella tibetensis

Species
- Y. tibetensis

Genus of bacteria

Youhaiella is a genus of bacteria from the family of Hyphomicrobiaceae with one known species (Youhaiella tibetensis).
