= Cucumibacter =

Scientific classification
- Domain: Bacteria
- Kingdom: Pseudomonadati
- Phylum: Pseudomonadota
- Class: Alphaproteobacteria
- Order: Hyphomicrobiales
- Family: Devosiaceae
- Genus: Cucumibacter; Hwang and Cho 2008

Type species
- C. marinus

Species
- C. marinus

Genus of bacteria

Cucumibacter is a genus in the phylum Pseudomonadota (Bacteria).

== Etymology ==
The name Cucumibacter derives from:
Latin noun cucumis, cucumber; Neo-Latin masculine gender noun, a rodbacter, nominally meaning "a rod", but in effect meaning a bacterium, rod; Neo-Latin masculine gender noun Cucumibacter, a cucumber-like rod.

== Species ==
The genus contains a single species, namely C. marinus ( Hwang and Cho 2008, (Type species of the genus).; Latin masculine gender adjective marinus, referring to the sea, from where the type strain was isolated.)

== See also ==
- Bacterial taxonomy
- Microbiology
