= Gohyeon-dong, Geoje =

Neighborhood of Geoje, South Korea

Coordinates: 37°33′N 127°25′E

Gohyeon-dong
- Interactive map of Gohyeon-dong
- Country: South Korea
- Region: Yeongnam

Area
  - Total: 5.14 km^{2} (1.98 sq mi)

Population (2011)
  - Total: 40,400
  - Density: 7,860/km^{2} (20,400/sq mi)
  - Dialect: Gyeongsang
- Website: geoje.go.kr

Korean name
- Hangul: 고현동
- Hanja: 古縣洞
- RR: Gohyeon-dong
- MR: Kohyŏn-dong

Gohyeon-dong (Korean: 고현동) is a dong (neighborhood) in Geoje, South Korea.

It contains the Geoje POW Camp and Gohyeon fortress.
