= Paul De Vos =

Belgian microbiologist

Paul De Vos is a Belgian microbiologist. He is an emeritus professor of the University of Ghent, where he was also head of the biochemistry and microbiology department. He was editor of Bergey's Manual of Systematic Bacteriology, Volume 3: The Firmicutes, published in 2009.

The Devosia genus of bacteria is named after him.
