= Maritalea =

Scientific classification
- Domain: Bacteria
- Kingdom: Pseudomonadati
- Phylum: Pseudomonadota
- Class: Alphaproteobacteria
- Order: Hyphomicrobiales
- Family: Devosiaceae
- Genus: Maritalea; Hwang et al. 2009

Type species
- Maritalea myrionectae

Species
- Maritalea mobilis Maritalea myrionectae Maritalea porphyrae

Synonyms
- Zhangella Wang et al. 2015

Genus of bacteria

Maritalea is a genus of Gram-negative, strictly aerobic, oxidase- and catalase-positive, rod-shaped, motile bacteria with peritrichous flagella from the family Devosiaceae.
