= Jangpyeong-dong =

- Panoramic view of Jangpyeong-dong
- Interactive map of Jangpyeong-dong
- Country: South Korea
- Region: Geoje city, Gyeongsangnamdo

Area
  - Total: 6.98 km^{2} (2.69 sq mi)
- Elevation: 50 m (160 ft)

Population (2011.6)
  - Total: 29,867
  - Density: 4,279/km^{2} (11,080/sq mi)

Korean name
- Hangul: 장평동
- Hanja: 長坪洞
- RR: Jangpyeong-dong
- MR: Changp'yŏng-dong

Jangpyeong-dong (Korean: 장평동) is a dong (neighborhood) of Geoje, South Gyeongsang Province, South Korea. It has an area of 5.86 km^{2}, and a population of 29,867 people consisting of 11,057 households. From 1979 it has been the home of the Samsung Heavy Industries complex (삼성중공업).

== History ==
- 1414AD (King Taejong's 14th year (태종14년)): Geochang and Geoje are unified under the name of Geojehyeon (거제현).
- 1423AD (Sejong's 5th year (세종5년)): Geoje's town fortress (거제읍성), commonly referred to as Gohyeon fortress(고현성), was constructed.
- 1663AD (Hyeongjong's 4th year (현종4년)): The town fortress was renamed as Gohyeon township (고현면).
- 1953.01.01AD: Geoje is named a county within Tongyeong county.
- 1963.01.01AD: Ilunmyeon's(일운면) local office is elevated to the status of Shinhyeon township (면), (신현면).
- 1979.05.01AD: Shinhyeonmyeon (신현면) is elevated to the status of town (읍).
- 1995.01.01AD: Jangseungpo city and Geoje county are unified into Geoje city.
- 2008.07.01AD: Shinhyeon township is divided into 4 neighborhoods (동) Jangpyeong, Gohyeon, Sangmun and Suyang. (장평동, 고현동, 상문동, 수양동)
- 2011.11.05AD: Jangpyeongdong citizen's center (장평동주민센터) and library is established.

Before Samsung Heavy Industries was established in 1979, it was a typical farming and fishing village. After the shipbuilding industry started and began producing some of the world's finest industrial ships, it became the center of Geoje's economic development. On July 1, 2008, Shinhyeon town was divided up into 4 neighborhoods, one of which became Jangpyeong.

== Geography ==
Jangpyeongdong is located to the east of Sadeung township (사등면) and west of Gohyeon-dong within Geoje city (고현동, 거제시). It is located to the north of Gyeryong Mountain (계룡산), and south of Samsung Heavy Industries complex (삼성중공업).

== Education ==
- Jangpyeong Elementary (장평초등학교)
- Jangpyeong Middle School (장평중학교)
- Yangji Elementary (양지초등학교)
