= Devosia riboflavina =

Scientific classification
- Domain: Bacteria
- Kingdom: Pseudomonadati
- Phylum: Pseudomonadota
- Class: Alphaproteobacteria
- Order: Hyphomicrobiales
- Family: Devosiaceae
- Genus: Devosia
- Species: D. riboflavina

Binomial name
- Devosia riboflavina (ex Foster 1944); Nakagawa et al. 1996

Synonyms
- Pseudomonas riboflavina Foster 1944

Species of bacterium

Devosia riboflavina is a Gram-negative soil bacterium. The species Pseudomonas riboflavina was transfer to Devosia riboflavina
