= Paradevosia =

Scientific classification
- Domain: Bacteria
- Kingdom: Pseudomonadati
- Phylum: Pseudomonadota
- Class: Alphaproteobacteria
- Order: Hyphomicrobiales
- Family: Devosiaceae
- Genus: Paradevosia; Geng et al. 2015

Type species
- Paradevosia shaoguanensis

Species
- P. shaoguanensis

Genus of bacteria

Paradevosia is a genus of bacteria from the family of Hyphomicrobiaceae with one known species (Paradevosia shaoguanensis).
