= Methyloterrigena =

Scientific classification
- Domain: Bacteria
- Kingdom: Pseudomonadati
- Phylum: Pseudomonadota
- Class: Alphaproteobacteria
- Order: Hyphomicrobiales
- Family: Devosiaceae
- Genus: Methyloterrigena; Kim et al. 2016

Type species
- Methyloterrigena soli

Species
- M. soli

Genus of bacteria

Methyloterrigena is a genus of bacteria from the family of Devosiaceae with one known species (Methyloterrigena soli).
