= Devosia =

Scientific classification
- Domain: Bacteria
- Kingdom: Pseudomonadati
- Phylum: Pseudomonadota
- Class: Alphaproteobacteria
- Order: Hyphomicrobiales
- Family: Devosiaceae
- Genus: Devosia; Nakagawa et al. 1996

Type species
- Devosia riboflavina

Species
- D. albogilva; D. confluentis; D. chinhatensis; D. crocina; D. enhydra; D. epidermidihirudinis; "Ca. D. euplotis"; D. geojensis; D. ginsengisoli; D. glacialis; D. honganensis; D. humi; D. hwasunensis; D. insulae; D. limi; D. mishustinii; D. neptuniae; D. pacifica; D. psychrophila; D. riboflavina; D. soli; D. subaequoris; D. submarina; D. terrae; D. yakushimensis

Synonyms
- Vasilyevaea Yee et al. 2010

Genus of bacteria

Devosia is a genus of Gram-negative soil bacteria. It is named after the Belgian microbiologist Paul De Vos. They are motile by flagella, the cells are rod-shaped.
