= Arsenicitalea =

Scientific classification
- Domain: Bacteria
- Kingdom: Pseudomonadati
- Phylum: Pseudomonadota
- Class: Alphaproteobacteria
- Order: Hyphomicrobiales
- Family: Devosiaceae
- Genus: Arsenicitalea; Mu et al. 2016

Type species
- Arsenicitalea aurantiaca

Species
- A. aurantiaca

Genus of bacteria

Arsenicitalea is a genus of bacteria from the family of Devosiaceae with one known species (Arsenicitalea aurantiaca).
