= Oedo =

Island in South Korea

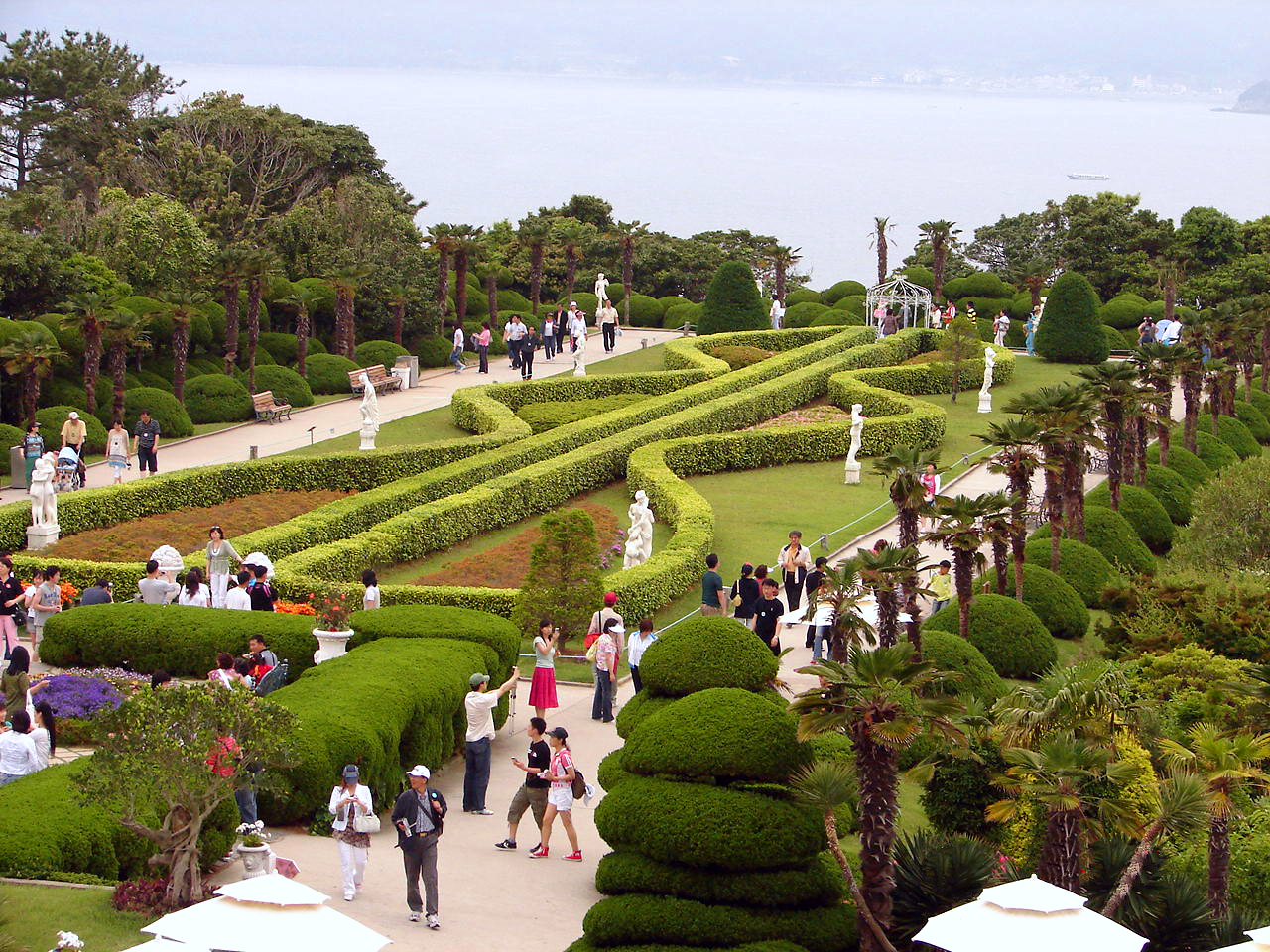
- Part of the botanical garden on the island (2006)
- Interactive map of Oedo

Geography
- Coordinates: 34.7683°N 128.7133°E

Administration
- South Korea
- Province: South Gyeongsang Province
- City: Geoje

Korean name
- Hangul: 외도
- Hanja: 外島
- RR: Oedo
- MR: Oedo

Oedo (Korean: 외도) is an island of Geoje, South Gyeongsang Province, South Korea. Currently, the entire island is a marine western-style botanical garden in Hallyeohaesang National Park. The garden was built by Lee Chang-ho and his wife when they settled on the island in 1969.

It is now a popular tourist attraction. It was the setting of the 2021 Netflix reality show New World.

== Description ==
In the past, Oedo was just an isolated, barren, rocky island with no electricity or telephone services. Only eight households lived in Oedo, due to its difficult access and lack of a dock in the early years of an independent South Korea.

Mr. Lee and his wife, Choi Ho Suk, gradually created the entire garden. At first, they grew tangerines and bred swine. However, when that failed the two decided to create a botanical garden.

In 1976, their plan was approved to cultivate 1,601,235 ft^{2} of space, growing rare plant species such as Agave americana, windmill palms, and Peruvian cactus. Oedo has a coastal climate with mild and a bit subtropical weather.

The island is home to more than 3,000 plant species including many subtropical plants, such as cactus, palm tree, gazania, sunshine, eucalyptus, bottlebrush bush, New Zealand flax, and agave. It is considered Geojedo's busiest tourist attraction.

Transport by ferry is required to access Oedo. These are available for a fee at several ports within the Hallyeohaesang National park and usually include a professional tour guide and a discussion of the area. To minimize congestion, there are eight paths to the island and the access fee to the island is included in the ferry ride. The ferries typically allow tourists to stay at the island for about 1.5 hours.

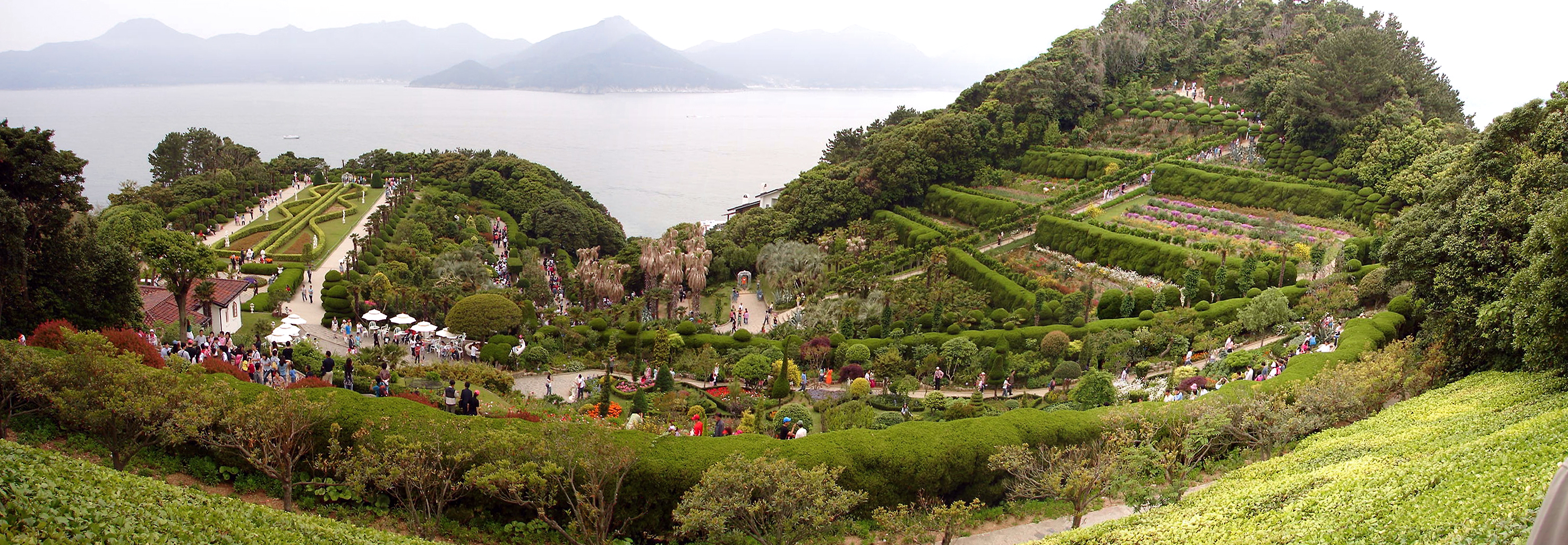
Panoramic view of the island

== Gallery ==
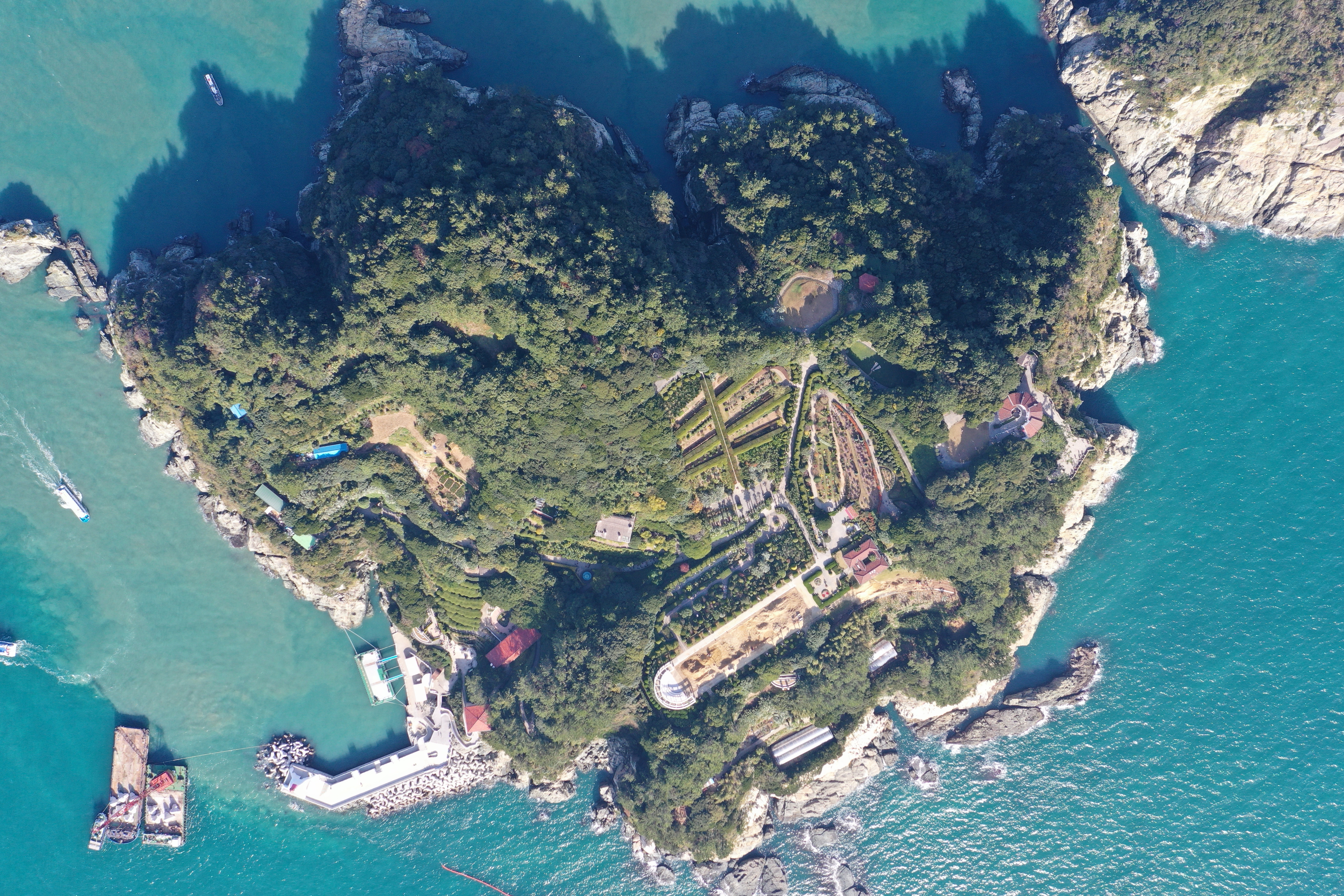
Aerial view of the island

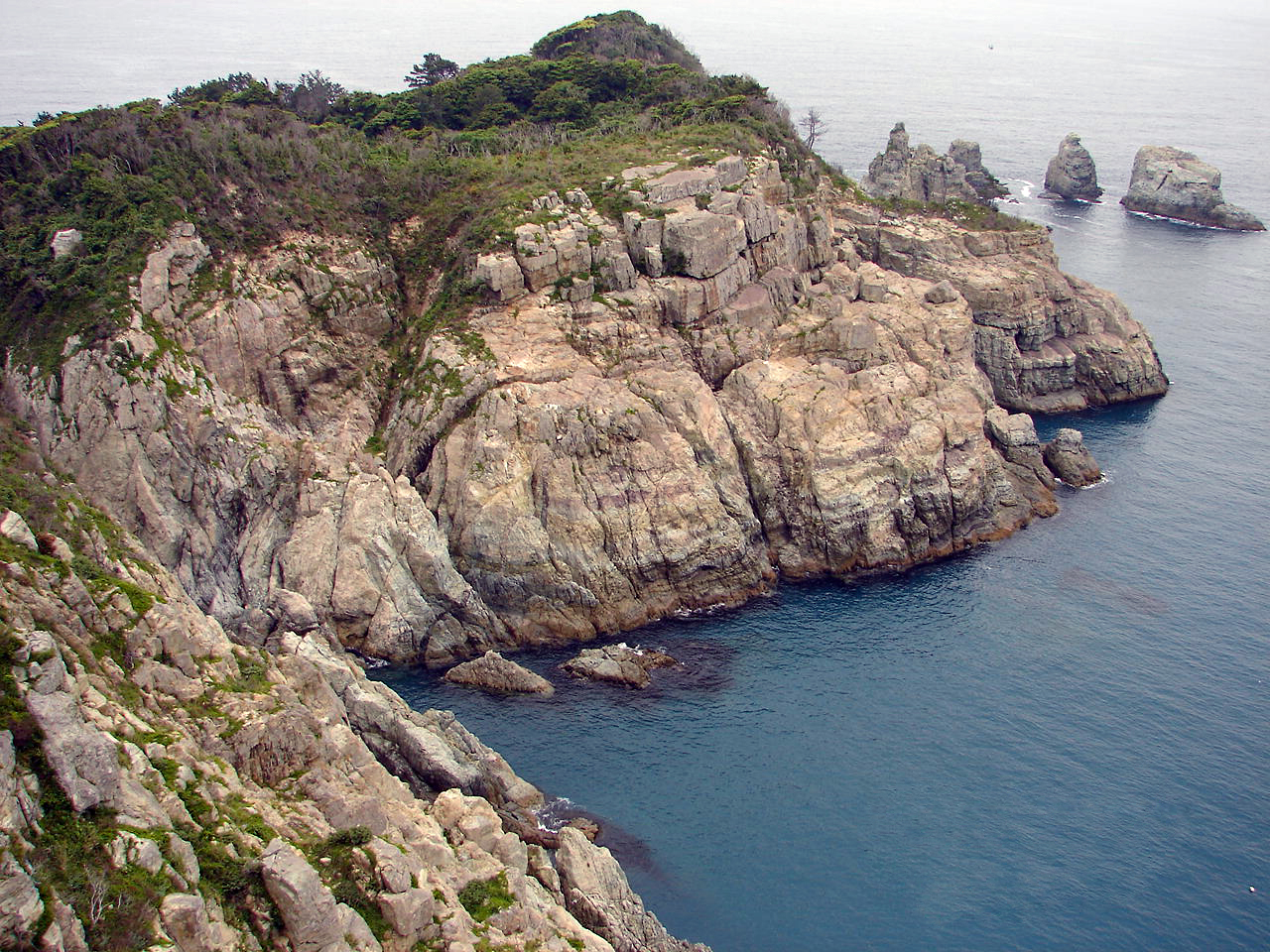
Hallyeo Haesang National Park

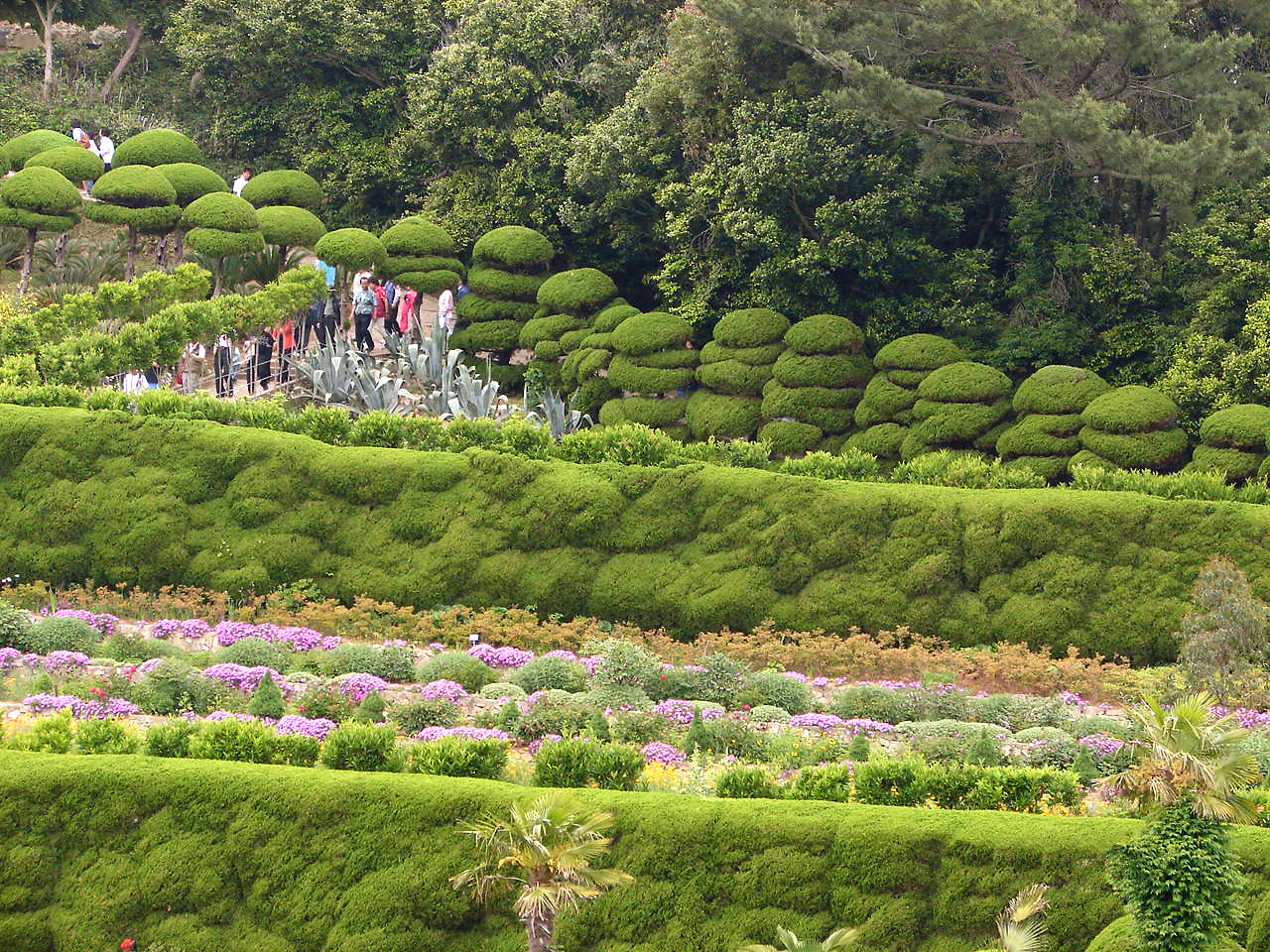
Botanic Garden

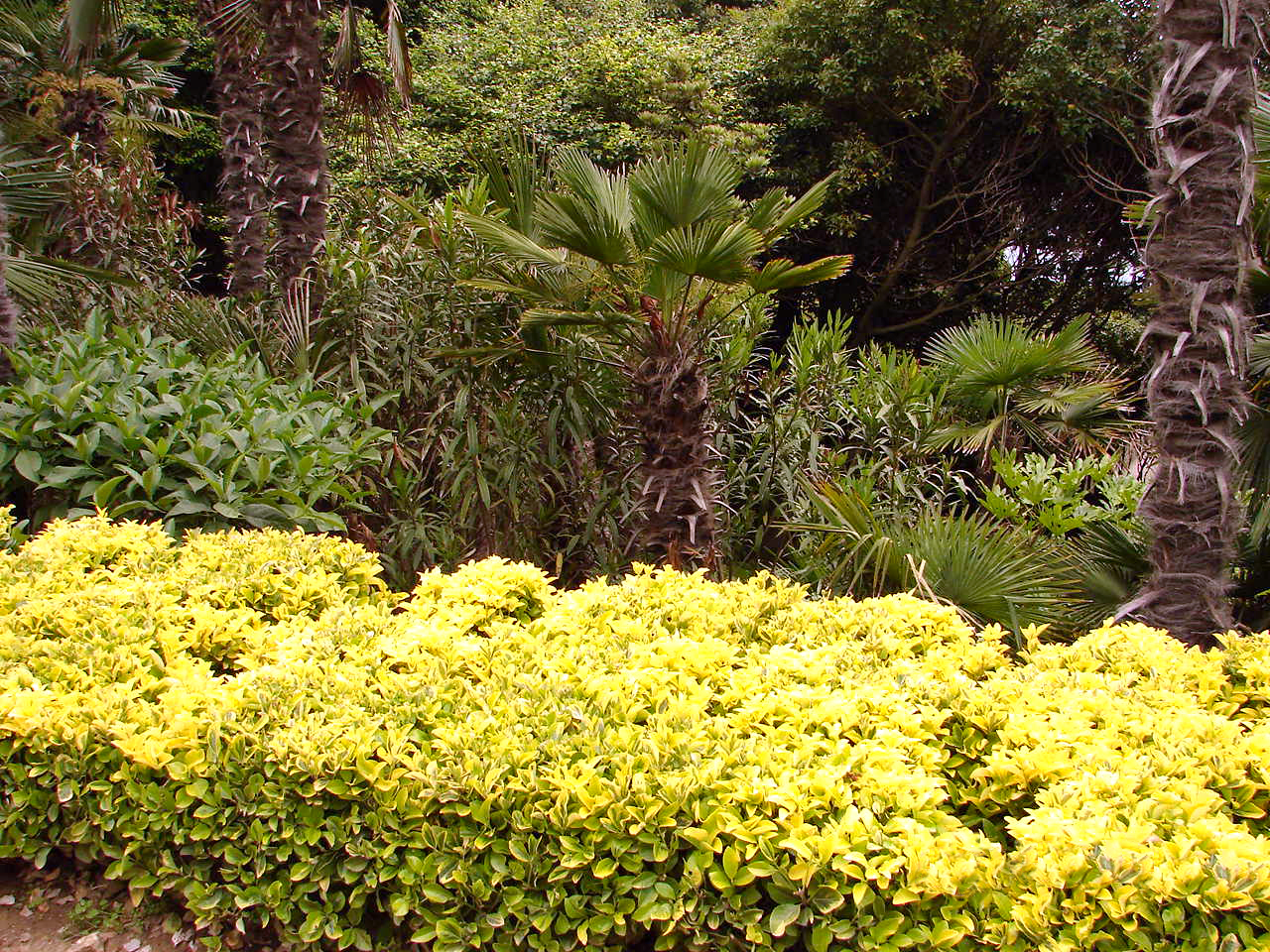
Botanic Garden2

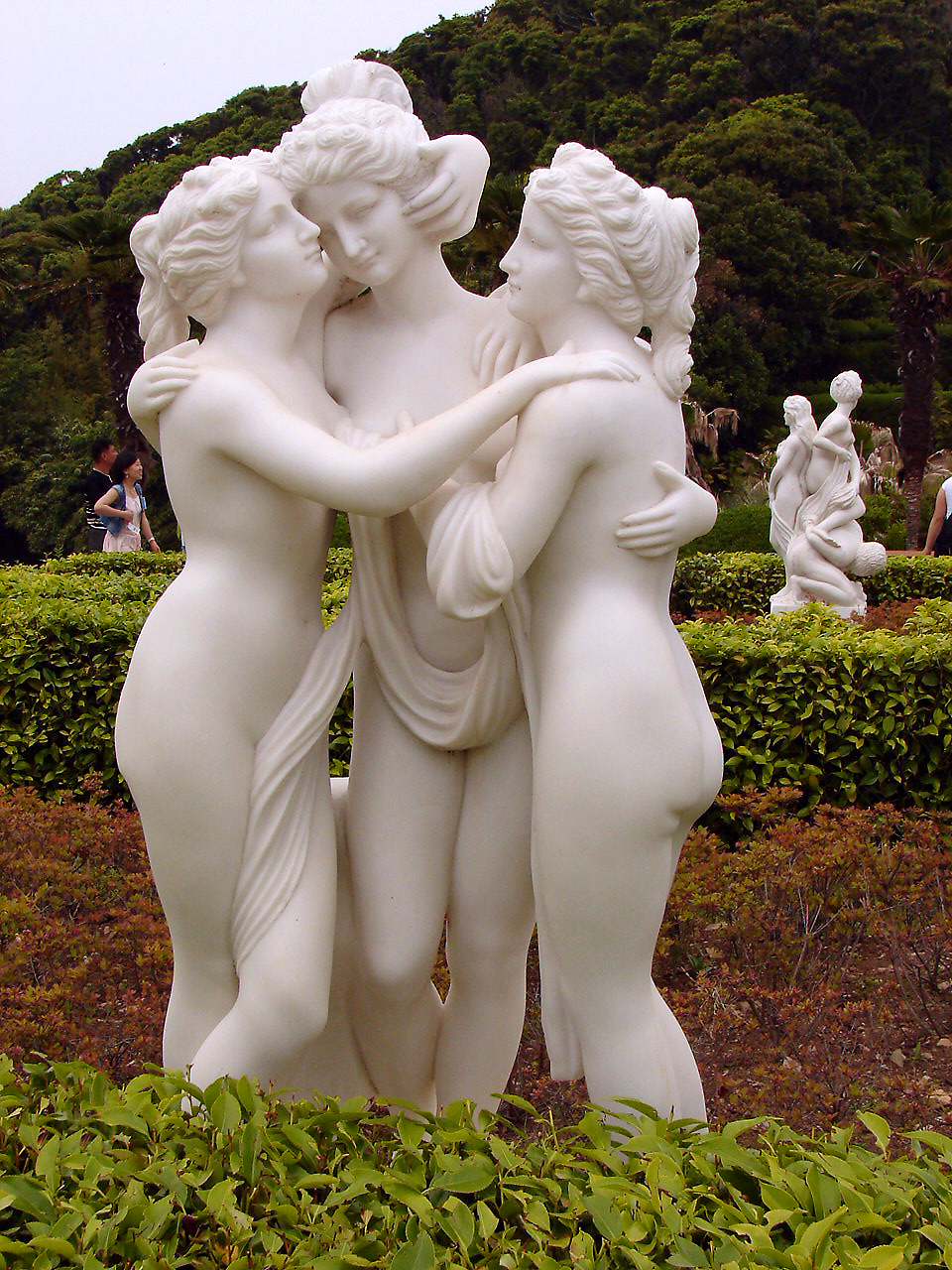
Sculpture

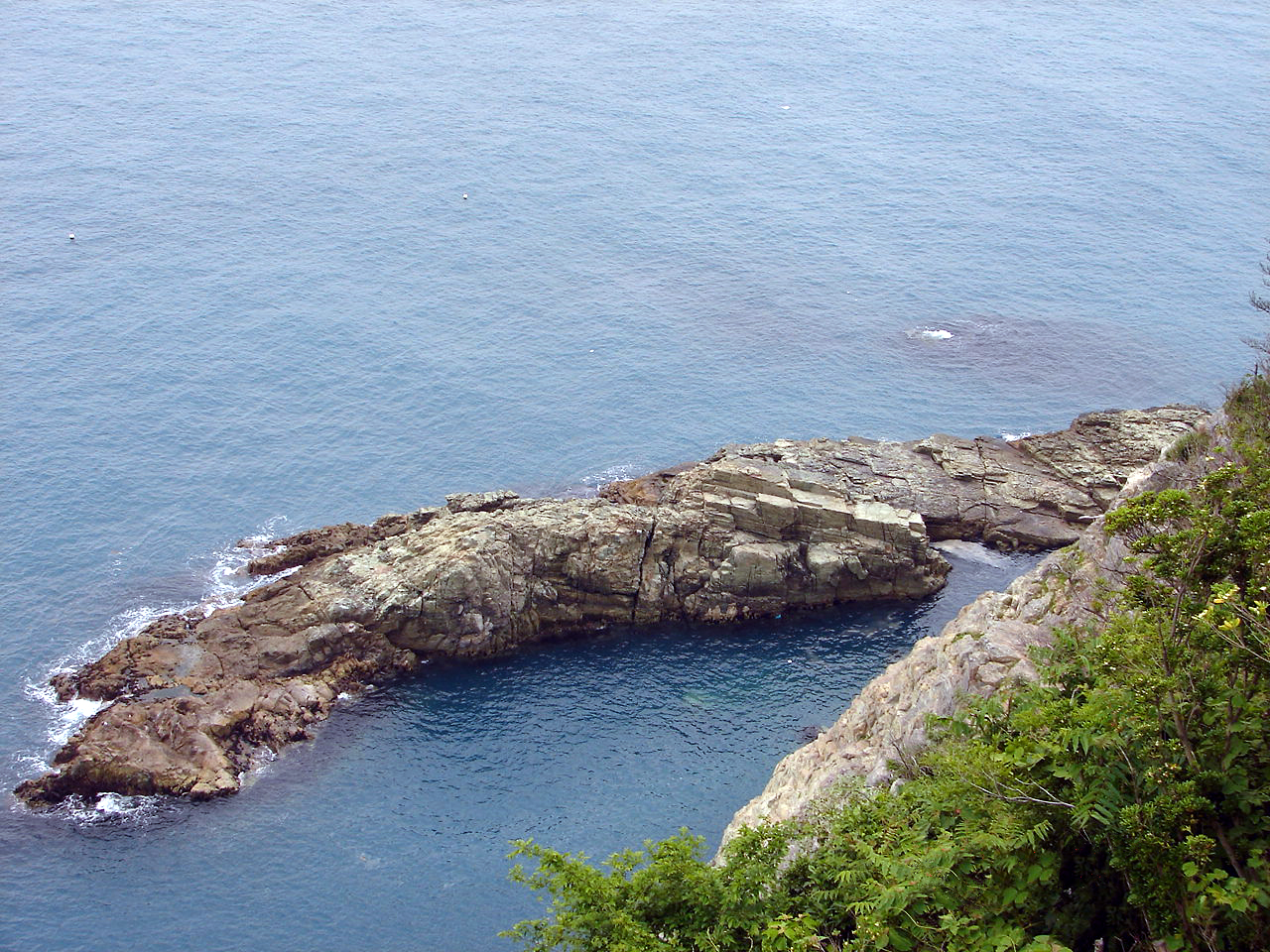
Hallyeo Haesang National Park

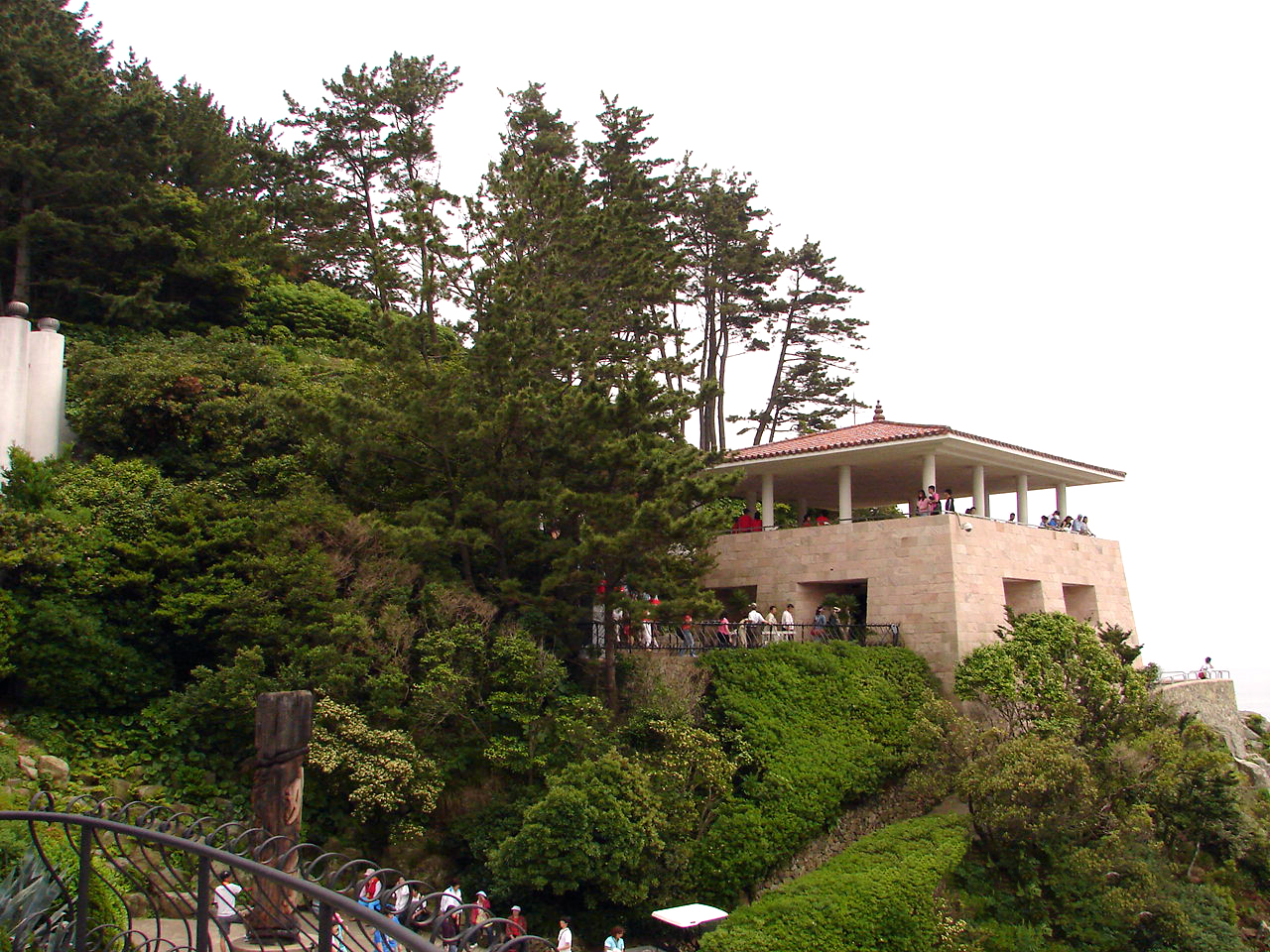
Outlook
