= Geoje =

City in South Gyeongsang, South Korea

Coordinates: 34°51′N 128°35′E

- Municipal city
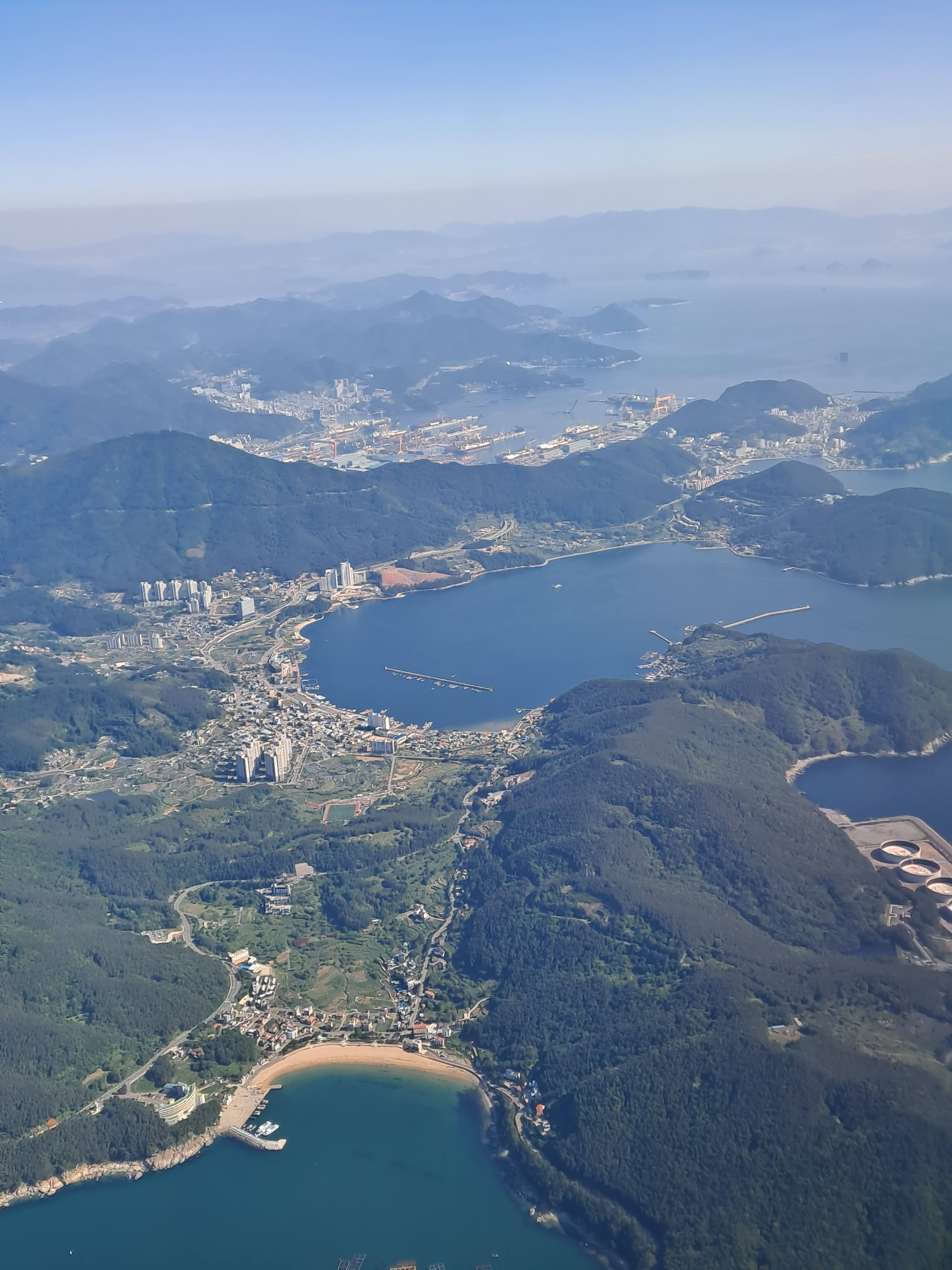
- View overlooking Okpodong and harbor in Geoje

- Flag Emblem of Geoje
- Nickname: Blue City Geoje
- Location in South Korea
- Country: South Korea
- Province: South Gyeongsang
- Administrative divisions: 9 myeon, 10 dong

Government
  - Mayor: Byeon Gwang Yong (Democratic)

Area
  - Total: 402.3 km^{2} (155.3 sq mi)

Population (September 2024)
  - Total: 232,921
  - Density: 547/km^{2} (1,420/sq mi)
  - Dialect: Gyeongsang
- Demonym: Geojeite
- Website: Geoje City Website

Korean name
- Hangul: 거제시
- Hanja: 巨濟市
- RR: Geoje-si
- MR: Kŏje-si

Geoje (Korean: 거제; Korean pronunciation: [kʌ.dʑe]) is a city located in South Gyeongsang Province, South Korea. It is located near Busan. Hanwha Ocean in Okpo and Samsung Heavy Industries (SHI) in Gohyeon are both located on Geoje Island. The city also offers a wide range of tourist sights. The city is made up of a number of islands, of which by far the largest is Geoje Island. There are multiple dong in the city: Jangpyeongdong, Okpo-dong and Gohyeon.

== Etymology ==
Geoje is Korean for "great rescue", from the syllables geo (Korean: 거; Hanja: 巨) meaning great, and je (제; 濟) meaning rescue.

== History ==
Geoje has a history stretching back thousands of years. Various artifacts dating back to the Neolithic era have been found at archaeological digs on Naedo, Sandaldo, and Isudo. While no written history can be found from this era, the digs show evidence of numerous small establishments along the coasts. The first written mention of Geoje appears as, Geoje being one of two main divisions of the Dokro kingdom, a member of the Byeonhan confederacy (circa 0-300 AD). The Byeonhan confederacy slowly gave way to the Gaya confederacy(42-562 AD). The Gaya eventually submitted to the Kingdom of Silla.

In 757, Gyeongdeok of Silla classified the island as "Geoje-gun" "거제군" (Geoje county). Modern Geoje is classified as a "si" (시) (city). In 1170, Uijong of Goryeo secretly escaped to Geoje when Chŏng Chung-bu raised a rebellion against him, instating his brother, Myeongjong as king. Geoje served as a strategic location in preparation of the naval forces for the Gihae Eastern Expedition (기해동정) of Tsushima Island in 1419 by the Korean general Yi Chongmu. At the time of the Seven-Year War in 1592, admiral Yi Sun-sin gained a great naval victory against Japanese invaders near the town of Okpo in Geoje. Since then. Yi was referred to by his noble title, "Chung Mu Gong," which roughly translates into English as "Earner of Great National Respect."

In the Korean War (1950–53), the military government of General Douglas MacArthur used the island as a place for the settlement for 170,000 POWs, and a Prisoner of war camp measuring at 11.8 square kilometres (4.6 mi^{2}) was established during these years. The prison was rife with human rights abuses, including summary execution and the widespread use of torture against prisoners by Canadian and American troops. British journalist Alan Winnington and Australian journalist Wilfred Burchett conducted extensive research to document these human rights abuses, and jointly published their findings in 1952. After the war, a portion (23,000 m^{2}) was converted into a tourist attraction.

During the last few decades Geoje has emerged as leader in the shipbuilding industries. Due to the continued industry, Geoje largely escaped the negative impacts of the Asian market crash of 1997.

Some notable people from Geoje include:

- Former President Kim Young-sam
- Poet Yu Chi-hwan, better known by his pen-name Cheongma.
- Former President Moon Jae-in
- Woni from the K-Pop group Rescene

== Demographics ==
According to the whitebook published by Geoje City in May 2014, Geoje had a population of 243,736, 12,240 of which are foreigners (non-Koreans). A significant portion of the population depends on shipbuilding to support their livelihood, and this can be evidenced by the fact that nearly 33% of workers are employed in the shipbuilding industry.

The population of Geoje Island is 232,807 as of October 2024.

== Tourism ==
Geoje offers a variety of attractions, including Haegeumgang island, Oedo, a marine western-style botanical garden in Hallyeo-Haesang National Park, built by Lee Chang-ho and his wife when they settled on the island in 1969. Visitors visit by ferry boat from the harbor neighboring the islands.

Tourists also visit Jisim-do for trekking. Jisim is known for its Camellia vegetation. However, the Maemi typhoon in 2003 severely affected the island's plant life. Another popular tourist attraction at Haegeumgang-do (located southeast of Geoje) is the Sipja Donggul Cave. Buddhist and Shamanist sculptures can be found in the cave.

Geoje is the second largest island in Korea, so discovering these locations is most easily done using a tourist map.

Geoje Tourist Map

=== Historic and cultural Sites ===
==== Geoje POW Camp ====
Geoje POW Camp (거제도포로수용소) was a prisoner of war detention camp for captured North Koreans established during the Korean War from (1951). It was the site of a prison riot on May 8, 1952, which is the topic of Chinese-American writer Ha Jin's fictional War Trash.

==== Gohyeon Castle ====
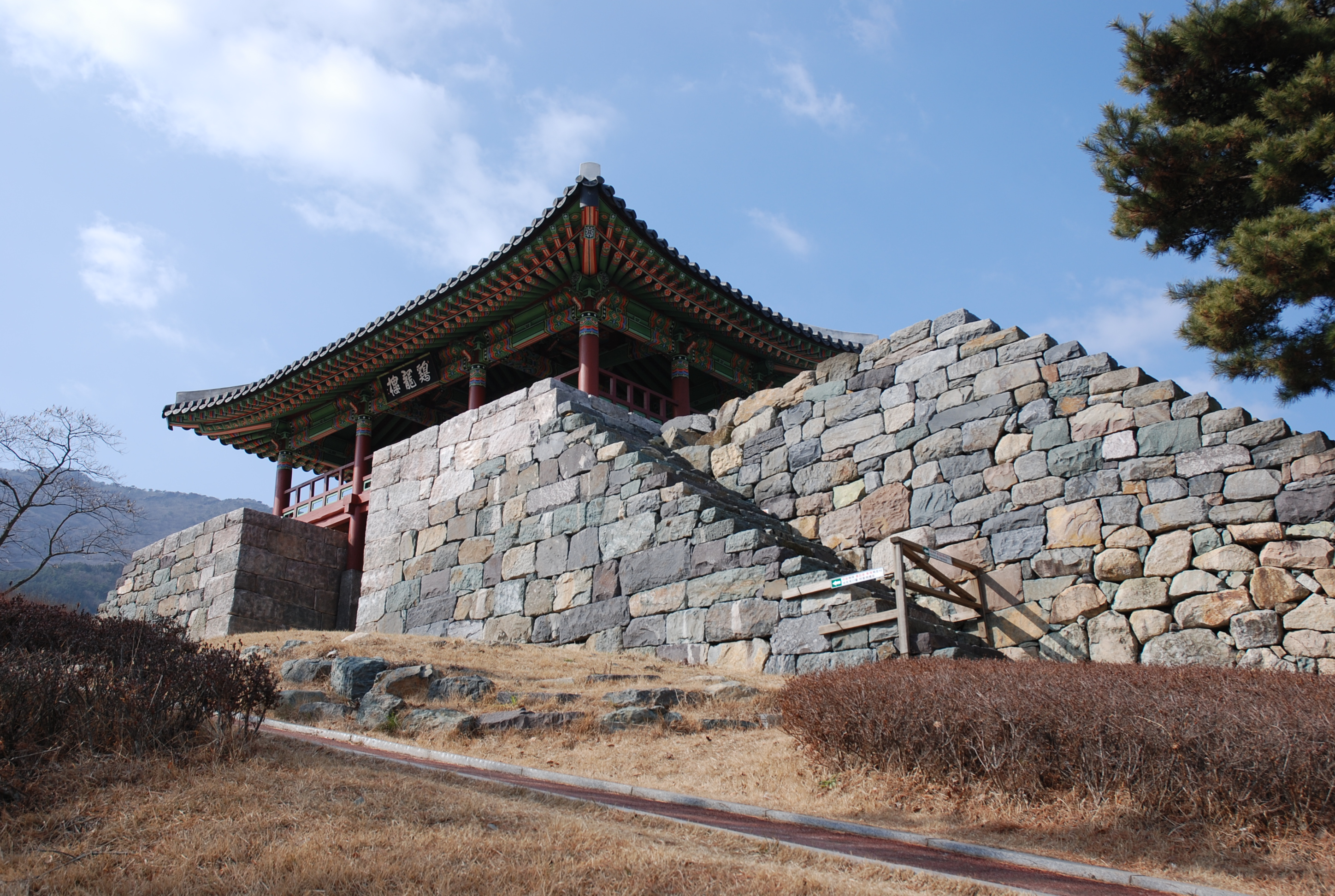
Geoje Gohyeon Castle

Gohyeon Castle is named the 46th national treasure of South Gyeongsang Province. Gohyeon Castle (고현성) and is located in Gohyeondong, Geoje. It was established during the Joseon period in 1451.

In the famous Joseon era geography book, Donggukyeojiseungram (동국여지승람), it was recorded that the Gohyeon castle had a circumference of 3,038 Cheok (척) (equivalent to about 9.2 km or 5.7 mi), and had a height of 13 Cheok (3.93 m (12.9 ft)). It was considered the largest castle in the South Sea.

==== Geoje Township Government Office ====
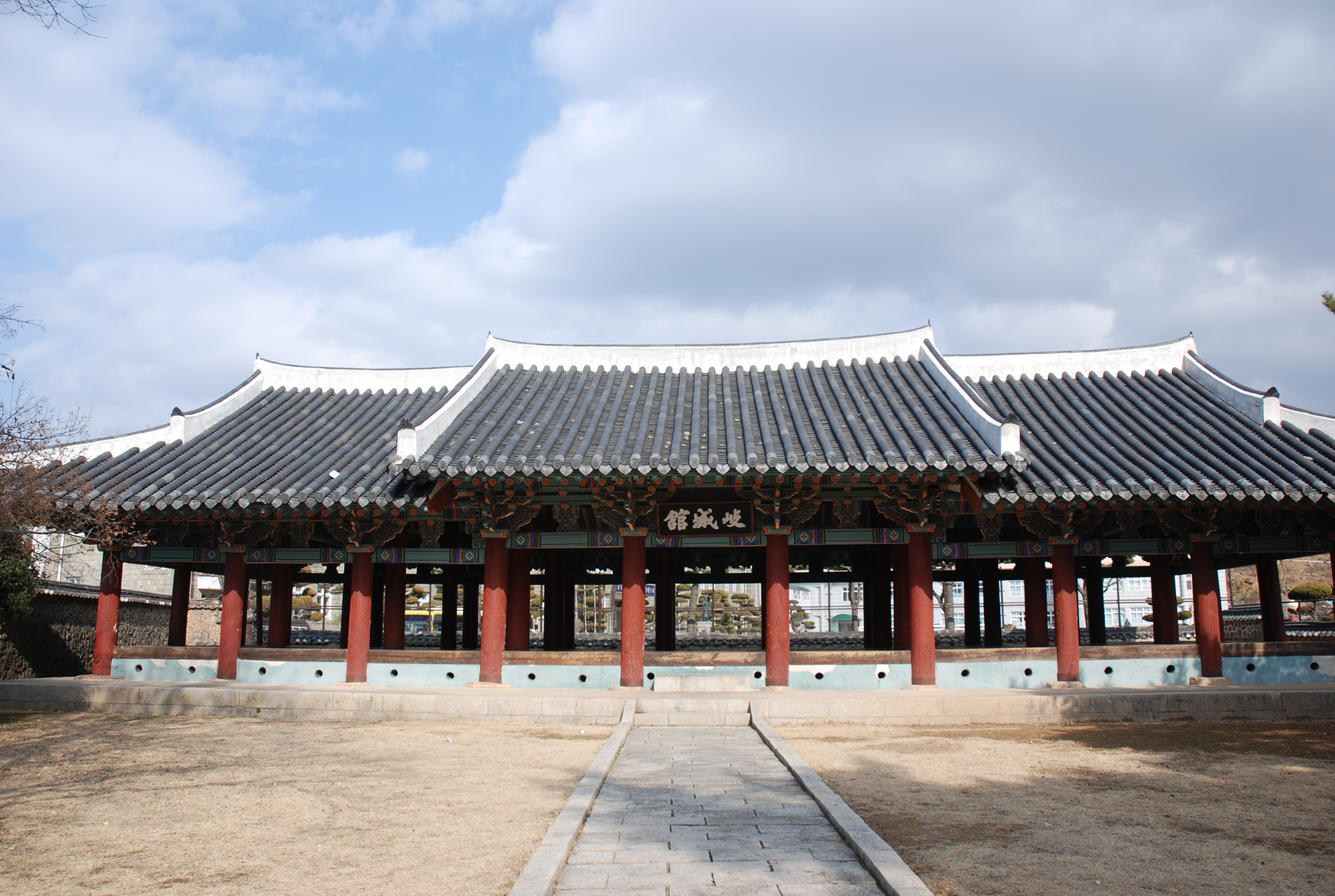
Geoje Government Office

The Geoje Township Government Office is regarded as Korea's 84th cultural treasure. During the time of the Japanese invasions, the office was established in 1470 to administer all military and shipbuilding plans.

==== Oksangeum Fortress Area ====
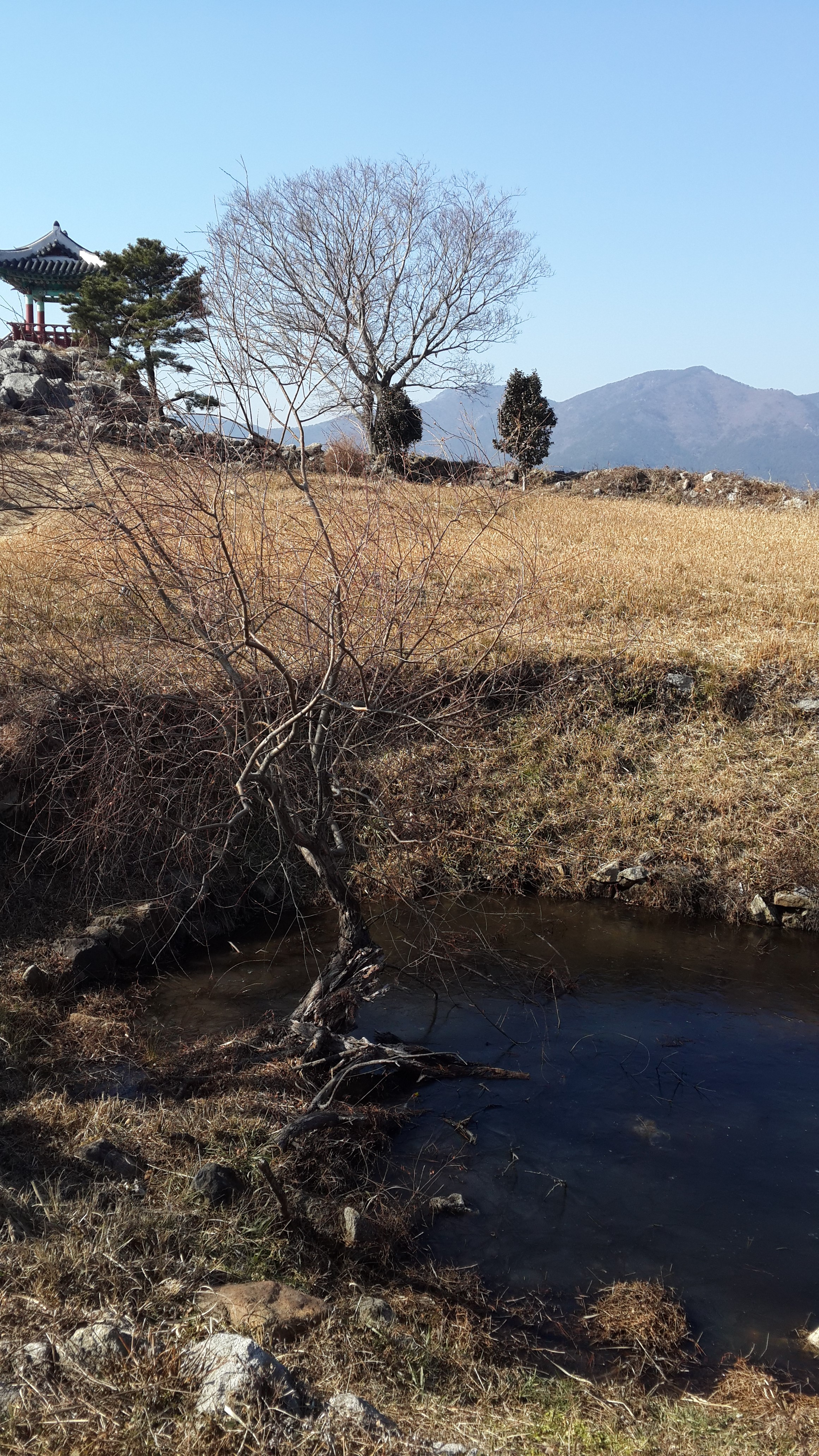
Oksangeum Fortress

The Oksangeum Fortress Area (옥산금성지) was an unsanctioned fortress built on the Sujeong peak to defend against Japanese invasion. Due to the strain it placed on the people during the building, the magistrate responsible was dismissed. Oksangeum Fortress is regarded as the South Gyeongsang Province's 10th cultural treasure.

==== Pyewang Fortress ====
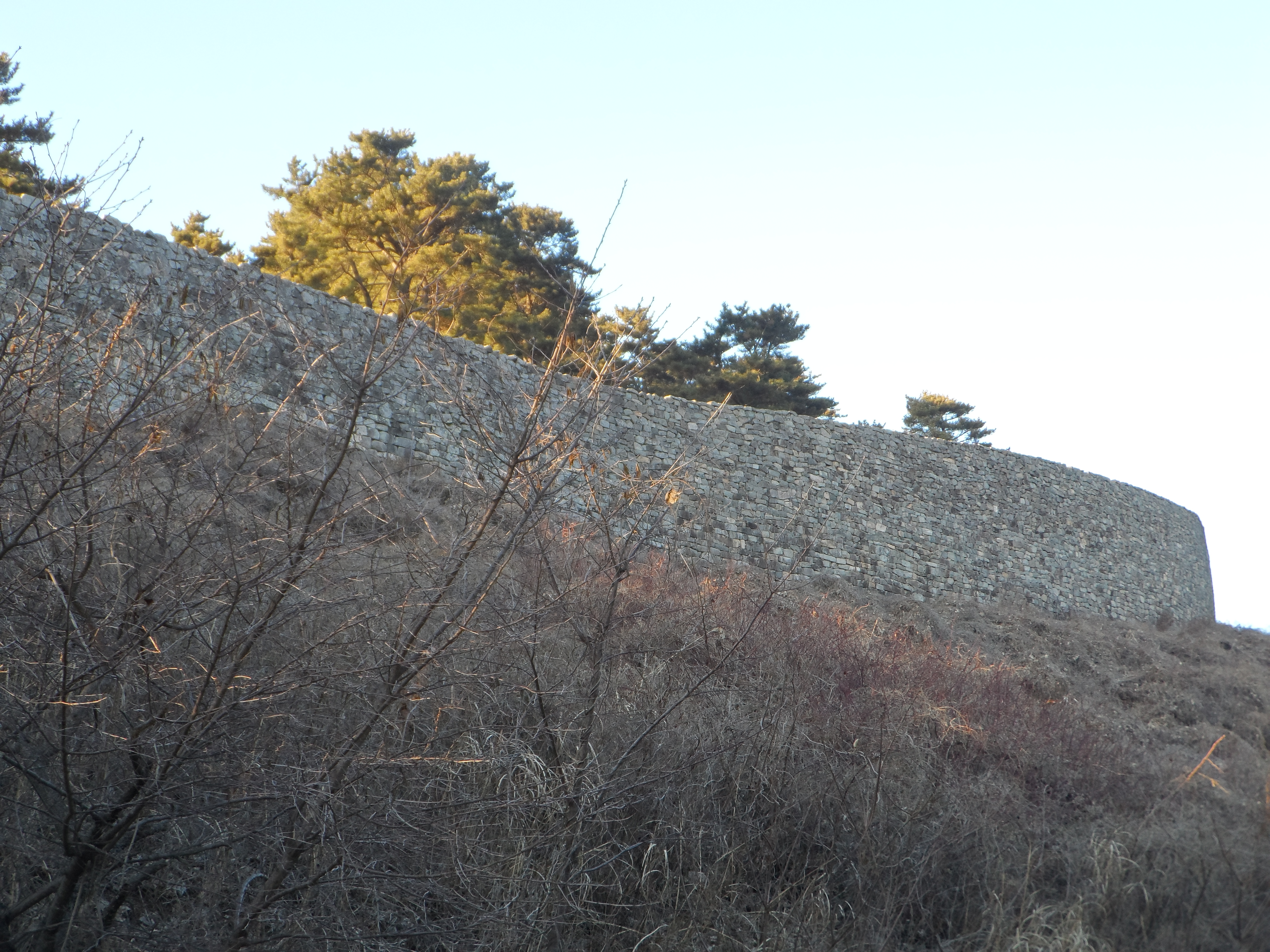
Pyewangseong in Dundeok is the oldest fortress in Geoje.

Pyewang Fortress (폐왕성) is the oldest surviving fortress in Geoje. First built during the Silla Dynasty, Pyewang fortress later served the fortress refuge for the King Uijong the 18th king of the Goryeo dynasty, while escaping from a military coup. Pyewang fortress is located in Dundeok-myeon. Pyewang fortress is regarded as the South Gyeongsang Province's 11th cultural treasure, and National Historical Site no. 509.

==== Okpo Great Victory Park ====
Okpo Great Victory Park is located in Okpo2Dong within Geoje. It commemorates the great victory over the invading Japanese navy by the honored general Yi Sun-sin on May 7, 1592.

==== Blue Horse (Poet) Museum ====
The Blue Horse (Cheongma, 청마) is a cultural exhibition and preserved birthplace museum of the poet "Blue Horse". It is located in Bangha village, Dundeokmyeon.

==== Jisimdo ====
Jisimdo (지심도) is an island of the east coast of Geoje. It is visited primarily for its vast amount of Camellia vegetation. Although damaged by Maemi typhoon, the camellias have mostly returned. It is also a site of a Japanese military installation, from the occupation of the early 20th century.

=== Museums ===
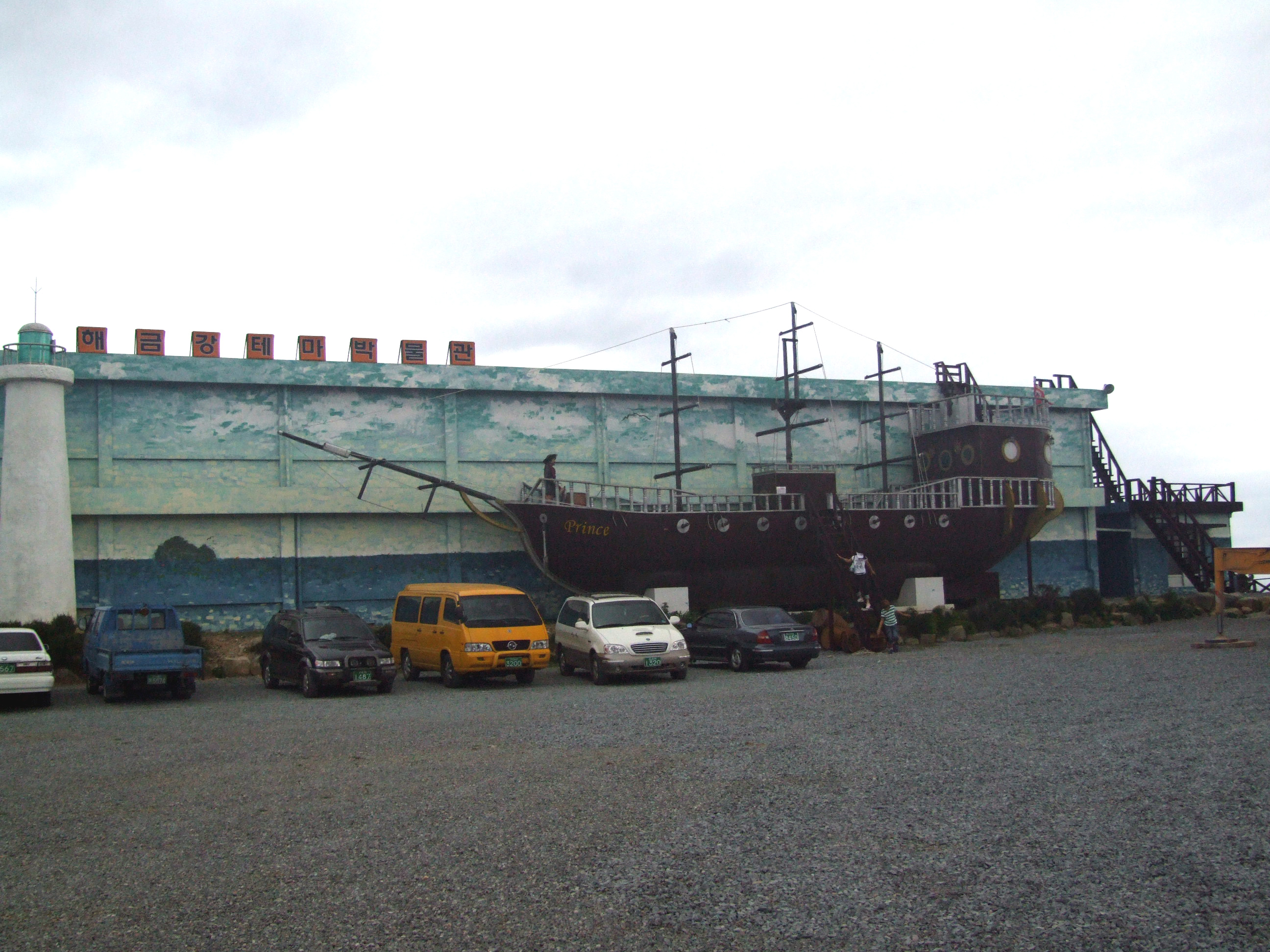
Geoje Themepark Museum

==== Haegeumgang Theme Museum ====
Haegeumgang Theme Museum (해금강테마박물관) is a museum of travel during the 1950s to the 1970s. It is located in Galgot village, Nambumyeon (거제시 남부면 갈곶리).

==== Geoje Shipbuilding Marine Cultural Center ====
The Geoje Shipbuilding Marine Cultural Center is an independently established combination of a Fishing Village Folk Museum and Shipbuilding Theme park museum located in Jisepo village, Ilunmyeon (지세포리, 일운면).

The Fishing Village Folk Museum covers two floors, including 4 exhibits: "The living sea/Traditions of the sea" and "Ocean experience/Renaissance of the sea".

Shipbuilding Theme park museum also covers two floors, including 5 exhibits: "Children's Shipbuilding yard/Dock 1" The history of sailing vessels/Dock 2 Shipbuilding technology/Dock 3 The future of the oceans/ Movie theatre

==== Geoje Museum ====
Geoje Museum (거제박물관) is located in Okpo. It features local artifacts used over the centuries by the people of Geoje.

=== Natural Attractions ===
==== Hill of Wind ====
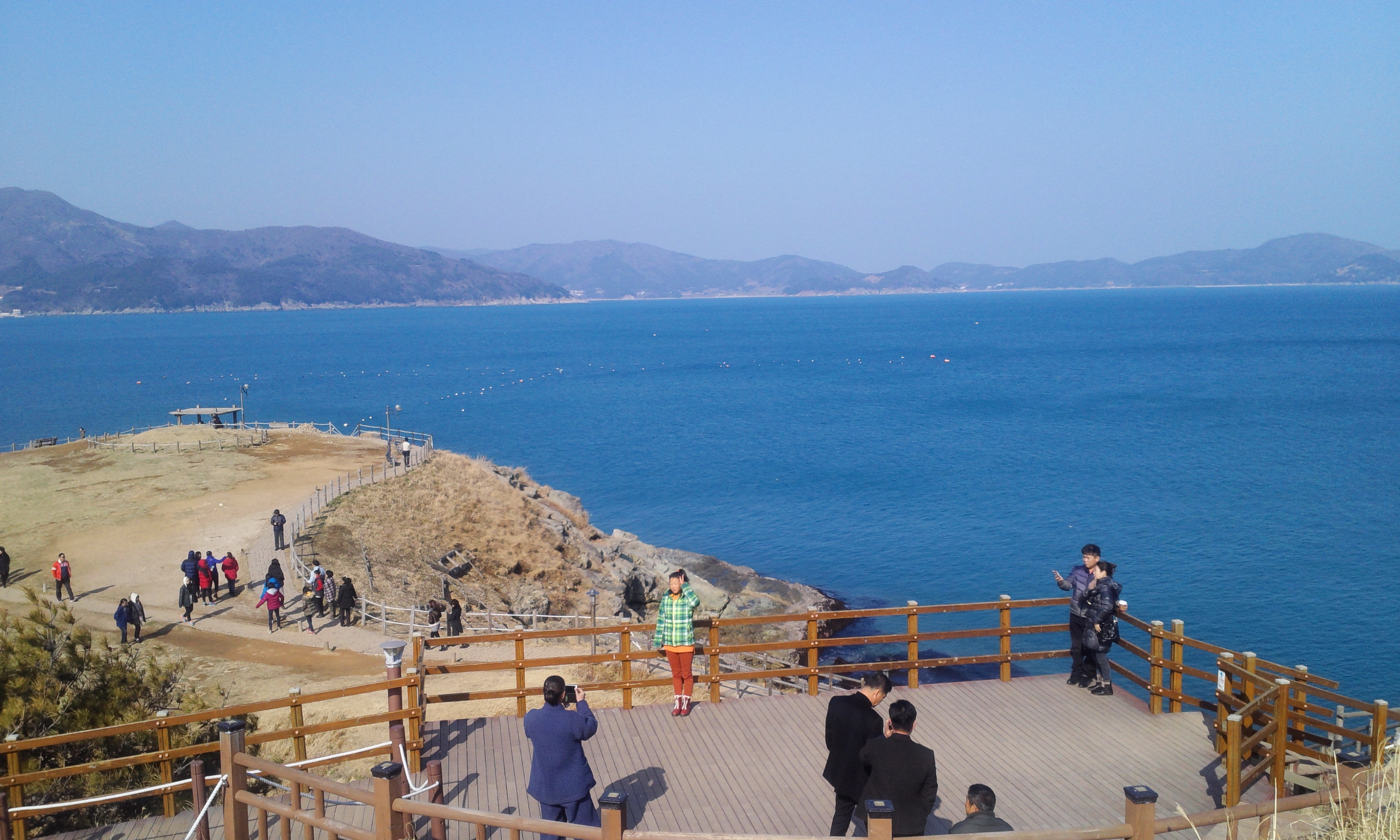
Hill of Wind overlooking South Sea

The Hill of Wind (바람의 언덕) is located in Galgot village, Nambumyeon (거제시 남부면 갈곶리). It overlooks South Sea and there is a strong wind. A windmill is set on top of hill. It became famous after 2 Days & 1 Night, where one of the most popular Korean TV shows was filmed.

==== Haegeumgang ====
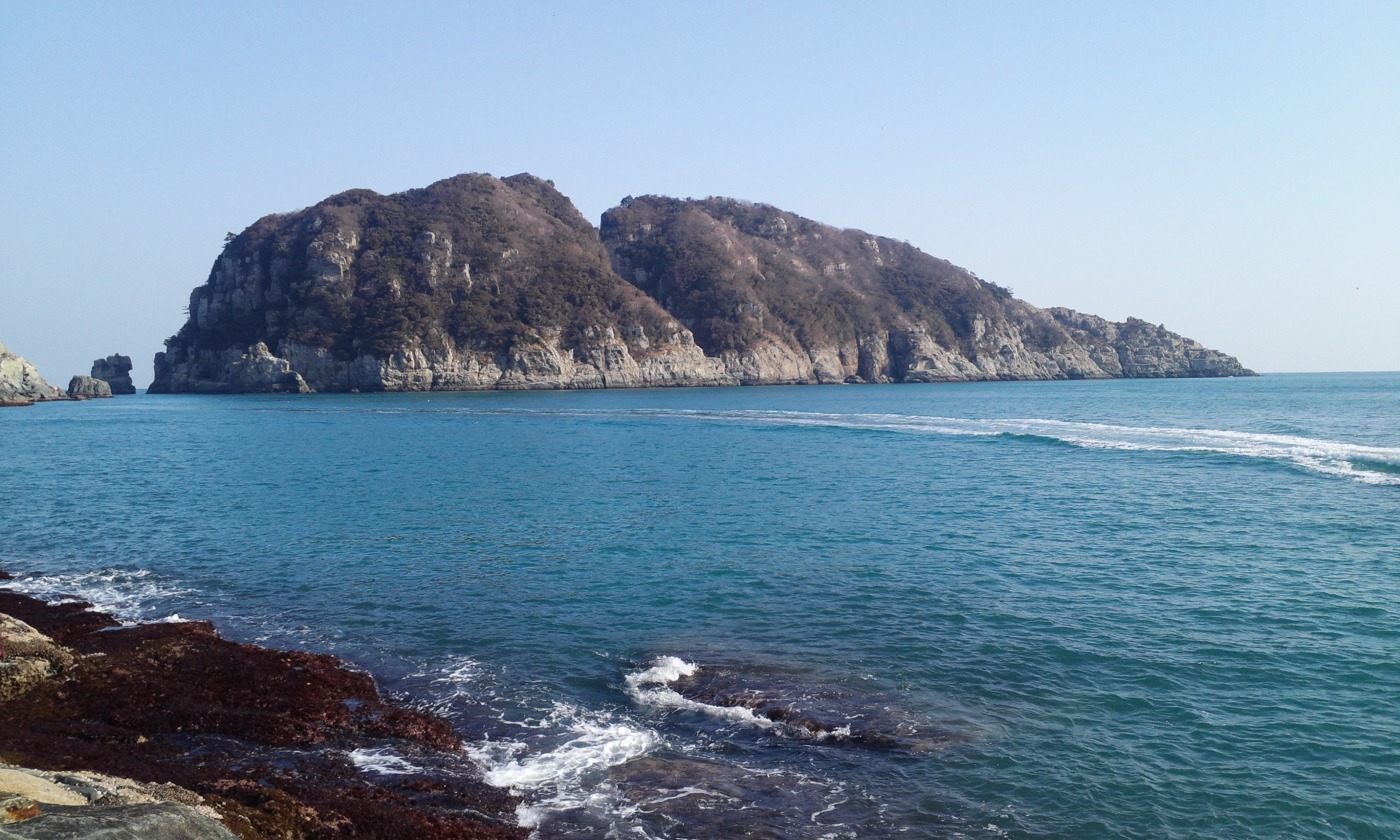
Haegeumgang (해금강)

Haegeumgang (해금강) is named for resemblance of the Haegeum mountain in North Korea. It is a primary tourist destinations in all of Geoje.

==== Oedo and Naedo ====
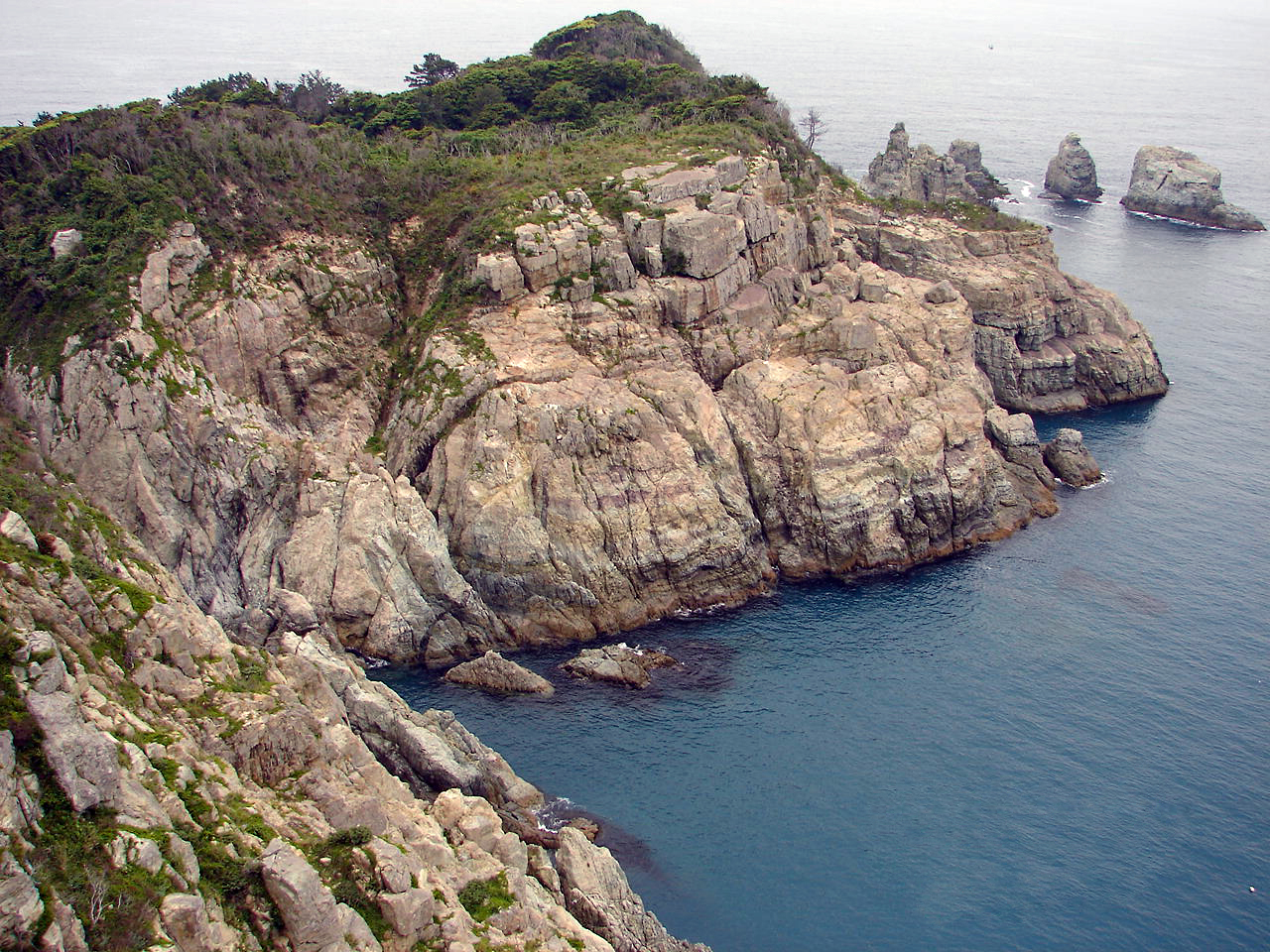
Oedo Island (외도)

Oedo (외도) and Naedo (내도) are two islands located in the southeast of Geoje island and of the two, Oedo hosts the second most visited attraction in all of Geoje, the expansive botanical gardens of Botania.

==== Sanbangsan Botanical Garden ====
Sanbangsan Botanical Garden (산방산비원) is a botanical garden in Sanbang-ri. This garden has many flower and tree varieties. Due to its remote location, it is much less busy than other botanical gardens.

==== Mundong Waterfall ====
Mundong Waterfall (문동폭포) is a small waterfall located above the Mundong Reservoir. It features trails and picnic areas at this location.

==== Gonggoji ====
Gonggoji (공곶이) is a mountain side garden located opposite Naedo island. It features Camellia trees, and daffodil fields. Due to there being no road access, you must walk to get to this location.

=== Beaches ===
- Gujora Beach 구조라 해수욕장
- Myeongsa Beach 명사 해수욕장
- Hakdong Pebble Beach학동 흑진주 몽돌해변
- Yeocha Pebble Beach 여차몽돌 해수욕장
- Heungnam Beach 흥남 해수욕장
- Wahyeon Sand Forest와현 모래숲해변
- Hwangpo Beach 황포 해수욕장
- Guyeong Beach 구영 해수욕장
- Hammok Beach 함목 해수욕장
- Jukrim Beach 죽림 해수욕장
- Deokpo Beach 덕포 해수욕장
- Nongso Pebble Beach 농소몽돌 해수욕장
- Mulan Beach 물안 해수욕장

=== Shipbuilding ===
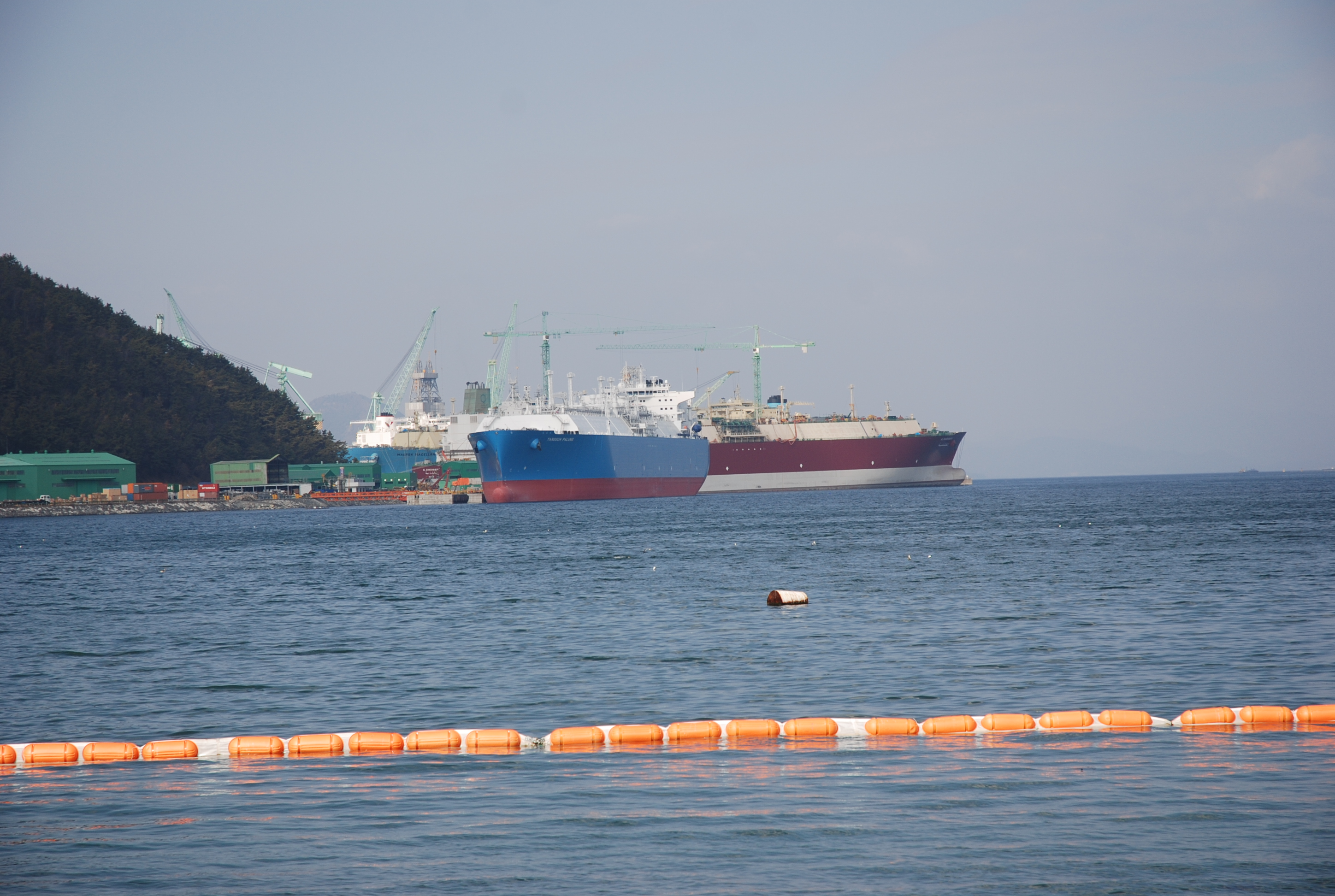
Shipbuilding in Gohyeon 고현의 삼성조선소

There are various shipbuilding docks which provide tours from the Daewoo and Samsung corporation located in both Gohyeon and Okpo.

=== Resorts ===
==== Daemyeong Resort ====
Daemyeong Resort is located in Ilun-myeon. It has various rooms. It offers a choice of several restaurants, karaoke rooms, billiards, table tennis and other entertainment options. There also the Ocean Bay Water Park on location, and the Marina Bay offers yacht and motor boat rentals.

=== Other Recreational Activities ===
Geoje offers an abundance of trails that can be used to hike, cycle, and some are suitable for ATV use.

== Administrative divisions ==
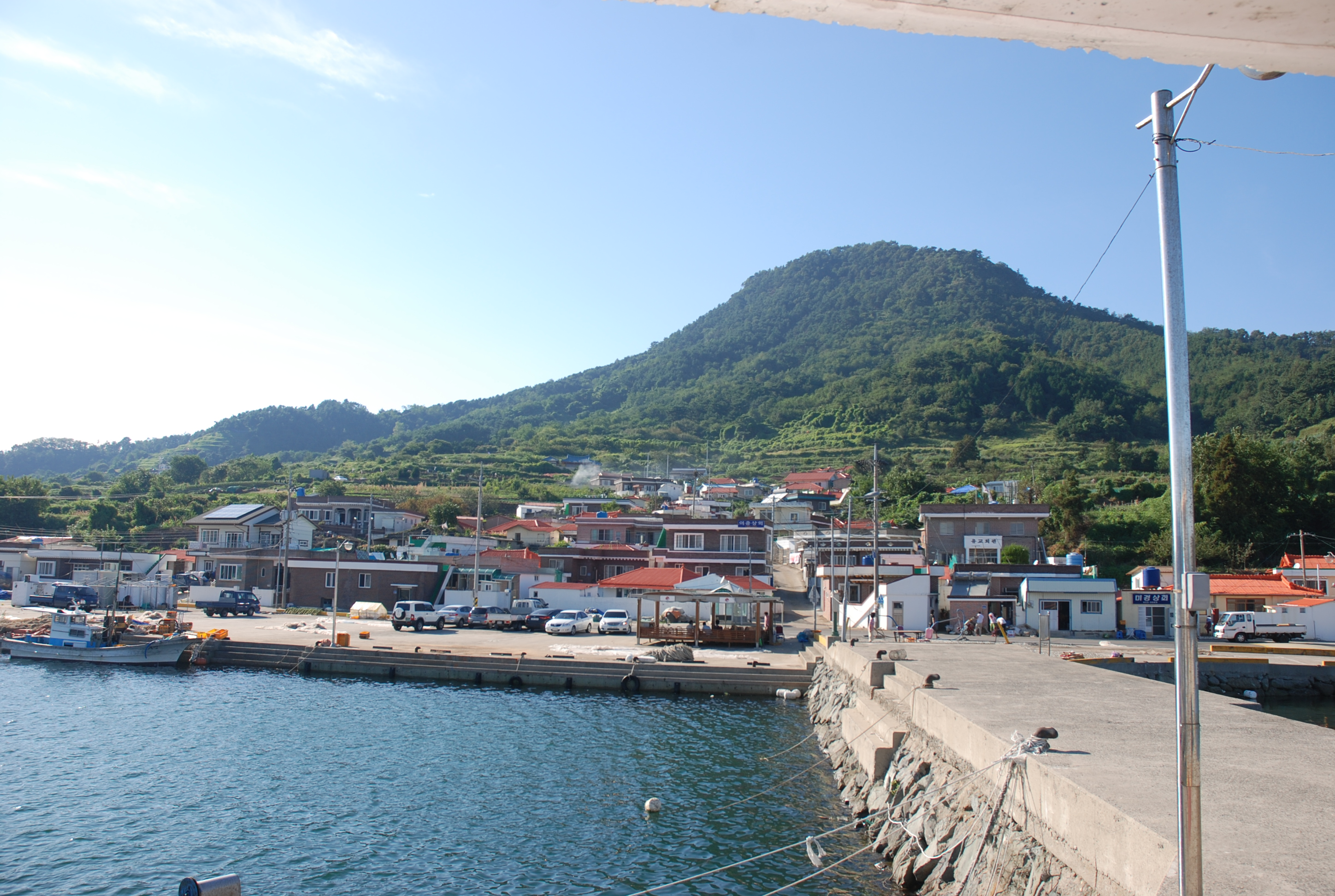
Yugyo Fishing port

According to a 2014 study, Geoje's Korean population was 243,736, and the foreign national population was 12,240. Although Gohyeon-dong is the fifth smallest of the dongs, it is the largest in population at 40,400. The cumulative area of Geoje is 402.3 km^{2}, with Dongbu-myeon (동부면) being the widest, and Majeon-dong (마전동) being the narrowest.

In 2008 Shinhyeon-eup (신현읍) was abolished, and in its place a new town was installed. It now divided into the separate dongs of Gohyeon-dong, Jangpyeong-dong, Sangmundong-dong, and Suyang-dong

The industrial area of Geoje has the highest man to women worker ratio in South Gyeongsang.

Myeon·Dong	Hangeul	Hanja	Area(km^{2})	Population	Map
Geoje-myeon	거제면	巨濟面	37.30	7,114	Map of Geoje in Korean
Nambu-myeon	남부면	南部面	31.87	1,945	Map of Geoje in Korean
Dongbu-myeon	동부면	東部面	52.50	3,682	Map of Geoje in Korean
Dundeok-myeon	둔덕면	屯德面	33.78	3,693	Map of Geoje in Korean
Sadeung-myeon	사등면	沙等面	34.69	9,578	Map of Geoje in Korean
Yeoncho-myeon	연초면	延草面	40.14	10,038	Map of Geoje in Korean
Ilun-myeon	일운면	一運面	30.50	7,468	Map of Geoje in Korean
Jangmok-myeon	장목면	長木面	36.89	5,410	Map of Geoje in Korean
Hacheong-myeon	하청면	河淸面	29.10	5,148	Map of Geoje in Korean
Gohyeon-dong (Geoje city proper)	고현동	古縣洞	5.14	40,400	Map of Geoje in Korean
Sangmun-dong (Geoje city proper)	상문동	上門洞	20.97	21,783	Map of Geoje in Korean
Suyang-dong (Geoje city proper)	수양동	水良洞	11.15	14,433	Map of Geoje in Korean
Jangpyeong-dong (Geoje City proper)	장평동	長坪洞	6.98	29,867	Map of Geoje in Korean
Neungpo-dong	능포동	菱浦洞	3.21	12,816	Map of Geoje in Korean
Aju-dong	아주동	鵝州洞	12.45	13,557	Map of Geoje in Korean
Okpo 1-dong	옥포1동	玉浦1洞	2.26	10,560	Map of Geoje in Korean
Okpo 2-dong	옥포2동	玉浦2洞	8.61	30,250	Map of Geoje in Korean
Jangseungpo-dong	장승포동	長承浦洞	2.15	4,409	Map of Geoje in Korean
Majeon-dong (Jangseungpo southside)	마전동	麻田洞	1.92	5,673	Map of Geoje in Korean

== Geography ==
Geoje covers an area of 401.63 square kilometres (155.07 sq mi), encompassing Geoje-do (383.44 square kilometres (148.05 sq mi)) and 60 other small islets, of which 10 are inhabited. The main island is joined to land by two bridges from nearby Tongyeong. It is also connected via a series of bridges and underwater tunnels to Gadeokdo, then Busan, named the Busan–Geoje Bridge. A proposal has been made to connect Geoje to Masan by another set of bridges and tunnels named Yi Sun-sin Great Bridge (이순신대교).

=== Climate ===
Geoje experiences a humid subtropical climate (Köppen: Cfa/Cwa), and temperatures reaching below zero degrees Celsius in winter are frequent during December to February. However, the island is kept relatively warm by the influence of warm ocean currents.

Typhoon Hinnamnor made landfall over the city. The eye centre directly passed over the city as a category 2 at 5:50 AM on September 6, 2022, leaving severe destruction around, including flooding.

Climate data for Geoje (1991–2020 normals, extremes 1972–present)
Month	Jan	Feb	Mar	Apr	May	Jun	Jul	Aug	Sep	Oct	Nov	Dec	Year
Record high °C (°F)	19.3 (66.7)	19.4 (66.9)	24.2 (75.6)	27.9 (82.2)	34.4 (93.9)	33.5 (92.3)	38.6 (101.5)	37.4 (99.3)	34.2 (93.6)	29.9 (85.8)	25.8 (78.4)	19.4 (66.9)	38.6 (101.5)
Mean daily maximum °C (°F)	7.3 (45.1)	9.4 (48.9)	13.5 (56.3)	18.6 (65.5)	23.1 (73.6)	25.8 (78.4)	28.3 (82.9)	29.9 (85.8)	26.5 (79.7)	22.0 (71.6)	15.7 (60.3)	9.5 (49.1)	19.1 (66.4)
Daily mean °C (°F)	2.6 (36.7)	4.4 (39.9)	8.4 (47.1)	13.4 (56.1)	17.9 (64.2)	21.2 (70.2)	24.8 (76.6)	26.0 (78.8)	22.0 (71.6)	16.7 (62.1)	10.6 (51.1)	4.7 (40.5)	14.4 (57.9)
Mean daily minimum °C (°F)	−1.4 (29.5)	−0.2 (31.6)	3.5 (38.3)	8.3 (46.9)	13.0 (55.4)	17.4 (63.3)	22.1 (71.8)	22.9 (73.2)	18.2 (64.8)	12.2 (54.0)	6.1 (43.0)	0.4 (32.7)	10.2 (50.4)
Record low °C (°F)	−10.4 (13.3)	−10.1 (13.8)	−8.0 (17.6)	−1.4 (29.5)	4.8 (40.6)	8.2 (46.8)	13.8 (56.8)	12.4 (54.3)	8.6 (47.5)	1.0 (33.8)	−5.2 (22.6)	−8.9 (16.0)	−10.4 (13.3)
Average precipitation mm (inches)	40.4 (1.59)	60.5 (2.38)	112.2 (4.42)	177.2 (6.98)	203.0 (7.99)	237.1 (9.33)	367.6 (14.47)	330.4 (13.01)	209.5 (8.25)	96.4 (3.80)	59.0 (2.32)	37.0 (1.46)	1,930.3 (76.00)
Average precipitation days (≥ 0.1 mm)	4.8	5.4	7.8	9.2	9.0	10.6	14.3	11.9	9.0	5.0	6.1	4.5	97.6
Average relative humidity (%)	54.0	54.4	58.5	60.0	65.3	73.4	79.5	76.6	73.3	67.6	63.4	56.8	65.2
Mean monthly sunshine hours	169.9	178.0	204.0	217.4	233.2	182.7	153.4	182.1	168.5	195.1	165.3	166.4	2,216
Percentage possible sunshine	52.0	57.8	54.2	55.3	53.5	43.1	33.4	43.9	46.4	58.8	53.4	55.0	49.5
Source: Korea Meteorological Administration (percent sunshine 1981–2010)

== Produce ==
Due to Geoje's coastal sub-tropical location, the area grows and harvests several different crops, some of which are uncommon in most of Korea. Some of these crops include yuja, pineapples, and mushrooms.

Being an island also provides an abundance of seafood that is collected locally.

== Islands of Geoje ==
- Geoje (거제도; 巨濟島)
- Oedo
- Galgotdo (Haegeumgang)
- Chilcheondo
- Jisimdo
- Gajodo
- Haegando
- Sandaldo
- Hawdo

== Education ==
There is an international school, International School of Koje (거제국제외국인학교).

== Transport ==
The city does not have its own airport. The nearest airport is Gimhae International Airport, located 60 km (37 mi) north east of Geoje.

== Sister cities ==
- Longjing, Jilin, China
- Qinhuangdao, Hebei, China
- Qidong, Jiangsu, China
- Guam, United States
- Yame, Fukuoka, Japan

=== Domestic ===
- Gurye County, South Jeolla Province
- Hadong County, South Gyeongsang Province

== See also ==
- List of cities in South Korea
- Geography of South Korea
- Geoje POW camp
