= Devosiaceae =

Scientific classification
- Domain: Bacteria
- Kingdom: Pseudomonadati
- Phylum: Pseudomonadota
- Class: Alphaproteobacteria
- Order: Hyphomicrobiales
- Family: Devosiaceae; Hördt et al. 2020

Genera
- Arsenicitalea Mu et al. 2016; Cucumibacter Hwang and Cho 2008; Devosia Nakagawa et al. 1996; Maritalea Hwang et al. 2009; Methyloterrigena Kim et al. 2016; Paradevosia Geng et al. 2015; Pelagibacterium Xu et al. 2011; Youhaiella Wang et al. 2015

Synonyms
- "Devosiaceae" Yarza et al. 2014

Family of bacteria

Devosiaceae is a family of Alphaproteobacteria.

== Phylogeny ==
The currently accepted taxonomy is based on the List of Prokaryotic names with Standing in Nomenclature (LPSN). The phylogeny is based on whole-genome analysis.

- - Devosiaceae
    - - Cucumibacter
      - Maritalea
    - - Pelagibacterium
      - - Arsenicitalea
        - - Youhaiella
          - - - Paradevosia
              - Methyloterrigena
            - Devosia
  - outgroup
    Aurantimonadaceae
