= List of the most popular given names in South Korea =

This is a list of the most popular given names in South Korea, by birth year and gender for various years in which data is available.

Aside from newborns being given newly popular names, many adults change their names as well, some in order to cast off birth names they feel are old-fashioned. Between 2000 and 2010, a total of 844,615 people (about 1 in every 60 South Koreans) applied to change their names; 730,277 were approved. In 2010, 552 men changed their name to Min-jun, and 1,401 women changed their name to Seo-yeon.

== 2021 ==
Boys
Common spelling	Hangul	RR	MR	Count
I-jun	이준	Ijun	Ijun	2,833
Seo-jun	서준	Seojun	Sŏjun	2,396
Ha-jun	하준	Hajun	Hajun	2,227
Do-yun	도윤	Doyun	Toyun	2,199
Eun-woo	은우	Eunu	Ŭnu	1,931
Si-woo	시우	Siu	Siu	1,831
Ji-ho	지호	Jiho	Chiho	1,606
Ye-jun	예준	Yejun	Yejun	1,455
Yu-jun	유준	Yujun	Yujun	1,380
Su-ho	수호	Suho	Suho	1,360

Girls
Common spelling	Hangul	RR	MR	Count
Seo-ah	서아	Seoa	Sŏa	2,340
Ha-yoon	하윤	Hayun	Hayun	2,064
I-seo	이서	Iseo	Isŏ	2,023
Ji-an	지안	Jian	Chian	1,670
Jia	지아	Jia	Chia	1,651
Seo-yun	서윤	Seoyun	Sŏyun	1,524
A-rin	아린	Arin	Arin	1,509
A-yun	아윤	Ayun	Ayun	1,453
Ha-rin	하린	Harin	Harin	1,437
Ha-eun	하은	Haeun	Haŭn	1,380

== 2019 ==
Boys
Common spelling	Hangul	RR	MR	Count
Seo-jun	서준	Seojun	Sŏjun	1,292
Ha-joon	하준	Hajun	Hajun	1,206
Do-yun	도윤	Doyun	Toyun	1,105
Eun-woo	은우	Eunu	Ŭnu	1,046
Si-woo	시우	Siu	Siu	1,046
Ji-ho	지호	Jiho	Chiho	915
Ye-jun	예준	Yejun	Yejun	872
Yu-jun	유준	Yujun	Yujun	819
Joo-won	주원	Juwon	Chuwŏn	811
Min-jun	민준	Minjun	Minjun	787

Girls
Common spelling	Hangul	RR	MR	Count
Ji-an	지안	Jian	Chian	1,140
Ha-yoon	하윤	Hayun	Hayun	1,029
Seo-ah	서아	Seoa	Sŏa	990
Ha-eun	하은	Haeun	Haŭn	952
Seo-yun	서윤	Seoyun	Sŏyun	894
Ha-rin	하린	Harin	Harin	860
Ji-yoo	지유	Jiyu	Chiyu	832
Ji-woo	지우	Jiu	Chiu	807
Soo-ah	수아	Sua	Sua	794
Ji-a	지아	Jia	Chia	728

== 2017 ==
Boys
Common spelling	Hangul	RR	MR	Count
Do-yun	도윤	Doyun	Toyun	2,120
Ha-joon	하준	Hajun	Hajun	2,084
Seo-jun	서준	Seojun	Sŏjun	1,891
Si-woo	시우	Siu	Siu	1,786
Min-jun	민준	Minjun	Minjun	1,771
Ye-jun	예준	Yejun	Yejun	1,658
Joo-won	주원	Juwon	Chuwŏn	1,637
Yu-jun	유준	Yujun	Yujun	1,488
Ji-ho	지호	Jiho	Chiho	1,458
Joon-woo	준우	Junu	Chunu	1,339

Girls
Common spelling	Hangul	RR	MR	Count
Ha-yoon	하윤	Hayun	Hayun	1,946
Seo-yun	서윤	Seoyun	Sŏyun	1,871
Seo-yeon	서연	Seoyeon	Sŏyŏn	1,659
Ha-eun	하은	Haeun	Haŭn	1,594
Ji-yoo	지유	Jiyu	Chiyu	1,582
Ji-woo	지우	Jiu	Chiu	1,469
Ha-rin	하린	Harin	Harin	1,441
Soo-ah	수아	Sua	Sua	1,416
Ji-a	지아	Jia	Chia	1,371
Seo-ah	서아	Seoa	Sŏa	1,289

== 2015 ==
Boys
Common spelling	Hangul	RR	MR	Count
Min-jun	민준	Minjun	Minjun	3,741
Seo-jun	서준	Seojun	Sŏjun	3,422
Ha-joon	하준	Hajun	Hajun	3,007
Do-yun	도윤	Doyun	Toyun	2,782
Joo-won	주원	Juwon	Chuwŏn	2,664
Ye-jun	예준	Yejun	Yejun	2,635
Joon-woo	준우	Junu	Chunu	2,174
Ji-ho	지호	Jiho	Chiho	2,095
Ji-hu	지후	Jihu	Chihu	1,968
Jun-seo	준서	Junseo	Chunsŏ	1,930
Total births of boys				222,854

Girls
Common spelling	Hangul	RR	MR	Count
Seo-yun	서윤	Seoyun	Sŏyun	3,048
Seo-yeon	서연	Seoyeon	Sŏyŏn	2,936
Ji-woo	지우	Jiu	Chiu	2,668
Ji-yoo	지유	Jiyu	Chiyu	2,468
Ha-yoon	하윤	Hayun	Hayun	2,356
Seo-hyeon	서현	Seohyeon	Sŏhyŏn	2,212
Min-seo	민서	Minseo	Minsŏ	2,209
Ha-eun	하은	Haeun	Haŭn	2,161
Ji-a	지아	Jia	Chia	2,140
Da-eun	다은	Daeun	Taŭn	2,000
Total births of girls				211,403

== 2013 ==
Boys
Common spelling	Hangul	RR	MR
Min-jun	민준	Minjun	Minjun
Seojun	서준	Seojun	Sŏjun
Joo-won	주원	Juwon	Chuwŏn
Ye-jun	예준	Yejun	Yejun
Si-woo	시우	Siu	Siu
Jun-seo	준서	Junseo	Chunsŏ
Do-yun	도윤	Doyun	Toyun
Hyun-woo	현우	Hyeonu	Hyŏnu
Gun-woo	건우	Geonu	Kŏnu
Ji-hun	지훈	Jihun	Chihun

Girls
Common spelling	Hangul	RR	MR
Seo-yeon	서연	Seoyeon	Sŏyŏn
Seo-yun	서윤	Seoyun	Sŏyun
Ji-woo	지우	Jiu	Chiu
Seo-hyeon	서현	Seohyeon	Sŏhyŏn
Min-seo	민서	Minseo	Minsŏ
Yun-seo	윤서	Yunseo	Yunsŏ
Chae-won	채원	Chaewon	Ch'aewŏn
Ha-yoon	하윤	Hayun	Hayun
Ji-a	지아	Jia	Chia
Eunseo	은서	Eunseo	Ŭnsŏ

== 2011 ==
Boys
Common spelling	Hangul	RR	MR
Min-jun	민준	Minjun	Minjun
Joo-won	주원	Juwon	Chuwŏn
Jun-seo	준서	Junseo	Chunsŏ
Si-woo	시우	Siu	Siu
Ye-jun	예준	Yejun	Yejun
Seo-jun	서준	Seojun	Sŏjun
Ji-hu	지후	Jihu	Chihu
Ji-hoon	지훈	Jihun	Chihun
Hyun-woo	현우	Hyeonu	Hyŏnu
Do-hyun	도현	Dohyeon	Tohyŏn

Girls
Common spelling	Hangul	RR	MR
Seo-yeon	서연	Seoyeon	Sŏyŏn
Seo-hyeon	서현	Seohyeon	Sŏhyŏn
Min-seo	민서	Minseo	Minsŏ
Seo-yun	서윤	Seoyun	Sŏyun
Ji-woo	지우	Jiu	Chiu
Ji-min	지민	Jimin	Chimin
Yun-seo	윤서	Yunseo	Yunsŏ
Ha-eun	하은	Haeun	Haŭn
Ji-yoon	지윤	Jiyun	Chiyun
Eun-seo	은서	Eunseo	Ŭnsŏ

== 2010 ==
Boys
Common spelling	Hangul	RR	MR	Count
Min-jun	민준	Minjun	Minjun	3,096
Ji-hu	지후	Jihu	Chihu	2,159
Ji-hoon	지훈	Jihun	Chihun	1,929
Jun-seo	준서	Junseo	Chunsŏ	1,876
Hyun-woo	현우	Hyeonu	Hyŏnu	1,841
Ye-jun	예준	Yejun	Yejun	1,747
Kun-woo	건우	Geonu	Kŏnu	1,727
Hyun-jun	현준	Hyeonjun	Hyŏnjun	1,681
Min-jae	민재	Minjae	Minjae	1,509
Woo-jin	우진	Ujin	Ujin	1,506

Girls
Common spelling	Hangul	RR	MR	Count
Seo-yeon	서연	Seoyeon	Sŏyŏn	3,474
Min-seo	민서	Minseo	Minsŏ	2,972
Seo-hyeon	서현	Seohyeon	Sŏhyŏn	2,678
Ji-woo	지우	Jiu	Chiu	2,493
Seo-yun	서윤	Seoyun	Sŏyun	2,476
Ji-min	지민	Jimin	Chimin	2,435
Su-bin	수빈	Subin	Subin	2,208
Ha-eun	하은	Haeun	Haŭn	2,156
Ye-eun	예은	Yeeun	Yeŭn	1,993
Yun-seo	윤서	Yunseo	Yunsŏ	1,921

== 2007 ==
Boys
Common spelling	Hangul	RR	MR	Count
Min-jun	민준	Minjun	Minjun	1,924
Ji-hoon	지훈	Jihun	Chihun	1,422
Hyun-woo	현우	Hyeonu	Hyŏnu	1,289
Jun-seo	준서	Junseo	Chunsŏ	1,279
Min-jae	민재	Minjae	Minjae	1,208
Hyun-jun	현준	Hyeonjun	Hyŏnjun	1,198
Jun-hyeok	준혁	Junhyeok	Chunhyŏk	1,173
Seung-min	승민	Seungmin	Sŭngmin	1,100
Dong-hyun	동현	Donghyeon	Tonghyŏn	1,072
Kun-woo	건우	Geonu	Kŏnu	1,069

Girls
Common spelling	Hangul	RR	MR	Count
Seo-yeon	서연	Seoyeon	Sŏyŏn	2,201
Min-seo	민서	Minseo	Minsŏ	2,059
Ji-min	지민	Jimin	Chimin	1,884
Seo-hyeon	서현	Seohyeon	Sŏhyŏn	1,606
Min-ji	민지	Minji	Minji	1,592
Ji-won	지원	Jiwon	Chiwŏn	1,574
Yun-seo	윤서	Yunseo	Yunsŏ	1,538
Ye-eun	예은	Yeeun	Yeŭn	1,507
Ji-yoon	지윤	Jiyun	Chiyun	1,505
Su-bin	수빈	Subin	Subin	1,499

== 2004 ==
Boys
Common spelling	Hangul	RR	MR	Count
Min-jun	민준	Minjun	Minjun	2,641
Ji-hoon	지훈	Jihun	Chihun	2,185
Hyun-woo	현우	Hyeonu	Hyŏnu	1,943
Jun-seo	준서	Junseo	Chunsŏ	1,908
Woo-jin	우진	Ujin	Ujin	1,811
Kun-woo	건우	Geonu	Kŏnu	1,722
Ye-jun	예준	Yejun	Yejun	1,704
Hyun-jun	현준	Hyeonjun	Hyŏnjun	1,636
Do-hyun	도현	Dohyeon	Tohyŏn	1,572
Dong-hyun	동현	Donghyeon	Tonghyŏn	1,571

Girls
Common spelling	Hangul	RR	MR	Count
Seo-yeon	서연	Seoyeon	Sŏyŏn	3,270
Min-seo	민서	Minseo	Minsŏ	2,881
Ji-min	지민	Jimin	Chimin	2,792
Seo-hyeon	서현	Seohyeon	Sŏhyŏn	2,625
Seo-yun	서윤	Seoyun	Sŏyun	2,514
Ye-eun	예은	Yeeun	Yeŭn	2,323
Ha-eun	하은	Haeun	Haŭn	2,109
Ji-woo	지우	Jiu	Chiu	2,107
Su-bin	수빈	Subin	Subin	2,069
Yun-seo	윤서	Yunseo	Yunsŏ	1,980

== 1990 ==
Boys
Common spelling	Hangul	RR	MR
Ji-hoon	지훈	Jihun	Chihun
Hyun-woo	현우	Hyeonu	Hyŏnu
Sung-min	성민	Seongmin	Sŏngmin
Sung-hyun	성현	Seonghyeon	Sŏnghyŏn
Min-soo	민수	Minsu	Minsu
Jun-young	준영	Junyeong	Chunyŏng
Joon-ho	준호	Junho	Chunho
Min-kyu	민규	Mingyu	Min'gyu
Dong-hyun	동현	Donghyeon	Tonghyŏn
Seung-hyun	승현	Seunghyeon	Sŭnghyŏn

Girls
Common spelling	Hangul	RR	MR
Ji-hye	지혜	Jihye	Chihye
Ji-eun	지은	Jieun	Chiŭn
Eun-ji	은지	Eunji	Ŭnji
Min-ji	민지	Minji	Minji
Hye-jin	혜진	Hyejin	Hyejin
Soo-jin	수진	Sujin	Sujin
Yu-jin	유진	Yujin	Yujin
Seul-ki	슬기	Seulgi	Sŭlgi
Ji-hyun	지현	Jihyeon	Chihyŏn
Ji-young	지영	Jiyeong	Chiyŏng

== 1980 ==
Boys
Common spelling	Hangul	RR	MR
Ji-hoon	지훈	Jihun	Chihun
Sung-min	성민	Seongmin	Sŏngmin
Jung-hoon	정훈	Jeonghun	Chŏnghun
Joon-ho	준호	Junho	Chunho
Hyun-woo	현우	Hyeonu	Hyŏnu
Sung-hoon	성훈	Seonghun	Sŏnghun
Jin-ho	진호	Jinho	Chinho
Dong-hyun	동현	Donghyeon	Tonghyŏn
Min-ho	민호	Minho	Minho
Jun-young	준영	Junyeong	Chunyŏng

Girls
Common spelling	Hangul	RR	MR
Ji-hye	지혜	Jihye	Chihye
Hye-jin	혜진	Hyejin	Hyejin
Ji-young	지영	Jiyeong	Chiyŏng
Ji-eun	지은	Jieun	Chiŭn
Soo-jin	수진	Sujin	Sujin
Eun-jung	은정	Eunjeong	Ŭnjŏng
Ji-yeon	지연	Jiyeon	Chiyŏn
Eun-young	은영	Eunyeong	Ŭnyŏng
Sun-young	선영	Seonyeong	Sŏnyŏng
Hyun-jung	현정	Hyeonjeong	Hyŏnjŏng

== 1970 ==
Boys
Common spelling	Hangul	RR	MR
Jung-hoon	정훈	Jeonghun	Chŏnghun
Sung-ho	성호	Seongho	Sŏngho
Sung-jin	성진	Seongjin	Sŏngjin
Ji-hoon	지훈	Jihun	Chihun
Sung-hoon	성훈	Seonghun	Sŏnghun
Joon-ho	준호	Junho	Chunho
Jung-ho	정호	Jeongho	Chŏngho
Sung-min	성민	Seongmin	Sŏngmin
Sang-hoon	상훈	Sanghun	Sanghun
Young-jin	영진	Yeongjin	Yŏngjin

Girls
Common spelling	Hangul	RR	MR
Ji-young	지영	Jiyeong	Chiyŏng
Hyun-jung	현정	Hyeonjeong	Hyŏnjŏng
Eun-jung	은정	Eunjeong	Ŭnjŏng
Hyun-joo	현주	Hyeonju	Hyŏnju
Eun-young	은영	Eunyeong	Ŭnyŏng
Eun-ju	은주	Eunju	Ŭnju
Mi-kyung	미경	Migyeong	Migyŏng
Eun-kyung	은경	Eungyeong	Ŭn'gyŏng
Sun-young	선영	Seonyeong	Sŏnyŏng
Mi-young	미영	Miyeong	Miyŏng

== 1960 ==
Boys
Common spelling	Hangul	RR	MR
Sung-ho	성호	Seongho	Sŏngho
Young-soo	영수	Yeongsu	Yŏngsu
Young-ho	영호	Yeongho	Yŏngho
Jung-ho	정호	Jeongho	Chŏngho
Young-chul	영철	Yeongcheol	Yŏngch'ŏl
Young-jin	영진	Yeongjin	Yŏngjin
Sung-soo	성수	Seongsu	Sŏngsu
Jin-ho	진호	Jinho	Chinho
Sang-hoon	상훈	Sanghun	Sanghun
Jung-hoon	정훈	Jeonghun	Chŏnghun

Girls
Common spelling	Hangul	RR	MR
Mi-kyung	미경	Migyeong	Migyŏng
Mi-sook	미숙	Misuk	Misuk
Kyung-hee	경희	Gyeonghui	Kyŏnghŭi
Young-sook	영숙	Yeongsuk	Yŏngsuk
Kyung-sook	경숙	Gyeongsuk	Kyŏngsuk
Jung-hee	정희	Jeonghui	Chŏnghŭi
Mi-young	미영	Miyeong	Miyŏng
Hyun-sook	현숙	Hyeonsuk	Hyŏnsuk
Young-hee	영희	Yeonghui	Yŏnghŭi
Young-mi	영미	Yeongmi	Yŏngmi

== 1950 ==
Boys
Common spelling	Hangul	RR	MR
Young-soo	영수	Yeongsu	Yŏngsu
Young-ho	영호	Yeongho	Yŏngho
Sung-soo	성수	Seongsu	Sŏngsu
Young-chul	영철	Yeongcheol	Yŏngch'ŏl
Jung-ho	정호	Jeongho	Chŏngho
Sung-ho	성호	Seongho	Sŏngho
Young-sik	영식	Yeongsik	Yŏngsik
Byung-chul	병철	Byeongcheol	Pyŏngch'ŏl
Young-hwan	영환	Yeonghwan	Yŏnghwan
Sang-chul	상철	Sangcheol	Sangch'ŏl

Girls
Common spelling	Hangul	RR	MR
Young-sook	영숙	Yeongsuk	Yŏngsuk
Jung-sook	정숙	Jeongsuk	Chŏngsuk
Young-hee	영희	Yeonghui	Yŏnghŭi
Jung-hee	정희	Jeonghui	Chŏnghŭi
Myung-sook	명숙	Myeongsuk	Myŏngsuk
Hyun-sook	현숙	Hyeonsuk	Hyŏnsuk
Kyung-sook	경숙	Gyeongsuk	Kyŏngsuk
In-sook	인숙	Insuk	Insuk
Kyung-hee	경희	Gyeonghui	Kyŏnghŭi
Kyung-ok	경옥	Gyeongok	Kyŏngok

== 1945 ==
Boys
Common spelling	Hangul	RR	MR
Young-su	영수	Yeongsu	Yŏngsu
Young-ho	영호	Yeongho	Yŏngho
Young-sik	영식	Yeongsik	Yŏngsik
Jung-woong	정웅	Jeongung	Chŏngung
Young-gil	영길	Yeonggil	Yŏnggil
Young-il	영일	Yeongil	Yŏngil
Jung-soo	정수	Jeongsu	Chŏngsu
Jung-nam	정남	Jeongnam	Chŏngnam
Kwang-su	광수	Gwangsu	Kwangsu
Joong-soo	중수	Jungsu	Chungsu

Girls
Common spelling	Hangul	RR	MR
Young-ja	영자	Yeongja	Yŏngja
Jeong-ja	정자	Jeongja	Chŏngja
Soon-ja	순자	Sunja	Sunja
Chun-ja	춘자	Chunja	Ch'unja
Kyung-ja	경자	Gyeongja	Kyŏngja
Ok-ja	옥자	Okja	Okcha
Myung-ja	명자	Myeongja	Myŏngja
Sook-ja	숙자	Sukja	Sukcha
Jung-soon	정순	Jeongsun	Chŏngsun
Hwa-ja	화자	Hwaja	Hwaja

== 1940 ==
Boys
Common spelling	Hangul	RR	MR
Young-ho	영호	Yeongho	Yŏngho
Jong-soo	종수	Jongsu	Chongsu
Byung-ho	병호	Byeongho	Pyŏngho
Young-gi	영기	Yeonggi	Yŏnggi
Il-sung	일성	Ilseong	Ilsŏng
Young-sik	영식	Yeongsik	Yŏngsik
Kyung-soo	경수	Gyeongsu	Kyŏngsu
Young-chul	영철	Yeongcheol	Yŏngch'ŏl
Sung-ki	성기	Seonggi	Sŏnggi
Jong-yul	종열	Jongyeol	Chongyŏl

Girls
Common spelling	Hangul	RR	MR
Young-ja	영자	Yeongja	Yŏngja
Young-sook	영숙	Yeongsuk	Yŏngsuk
Kyung-ja	경자	Gyeongja	Kyŏngja
Jung-sook	정숙	Jeongsuk	Chŏngsuk
Sook-ja	숙자	Sukja	Sukcha
Jeong-ja	정자	Jeongja	Chŏngja
Soon-ja	순자	Sunja	Sunja
Soon-hee	순희	Sunhui	Sunhŭi
Jung-soon	정순	Jeongsun	Chŏngsun
Chun-ja	춘자	Chunja	Ch'unja

== See also ==
- List of Korean given names
