= Sook-ja =

- Hangul: 숙자
- RR: Sukja
- MR: Sukcha

Sook-ja, also spelled Suk-ja, is a Korean given name. According to South Korean government data, it was the fifth-most popular name for newborn girls in 1940. Typically, "ja" is written with the hanja meaning "child" (子). It is one of a number of Japanese-style names ending in "ja", like Young-ja and Jeong-ja, that were popular when Korea was under Japanese rule, but declined in popularity afterwards. By 1950 there were no names ending in "ja" in the top ten. The characters used to write this name can also be read as a number of different Japanese female given names, including Yoshiko and Toshiko.

People with this name include:

- Kim Sook-ja (1926–1991), South Korean pansori musician
- Hong Sook-ja (born 1933), South Korean diplomat and writer
- Sue Kim Bonifazio, birth name Kim Sook-ja, South Korean-born American singer
- Oh Sook-ja (born 1941), South Korean composer
- Shin Suk-ja (born 1942), South Korean prisoner of conscience in North Korea
- Yoon Sook-ja (born 1948), South Korean cooking researcher and professor
- Im Sook-ja (born 1966), South Korean former tennis player
- Park Suk-ja (born 1970), South Korean athlete
- Lee Sook-ja (born 1980), South Korean volleyball player

== See also ==
- List of Korean given names
