= Kyung-ja =

- Hangul: 경자
- RR: Gyeongja
- MR: Kyŏngja

Kyung-ja, also spelled Kyong-ja, Kyoung-ja or Gyeong-ja, is a Korean given name. Typically, "ja" is written with the hanja meaning "child" (子). The characters used to write this name can also be read as a Japanese female given name Keiko.

Kyung-ja is one of a number of Japanese-style names ending in "ja", like Young-ja and Jeong-ja, that were popular when Korea was under Japanese rule, but declined in popularity afterwards. According to South Korean government data, it was the third-most popular name for newborn girls in 1940. However, by 1950 there were no names ending in "ja" in the top ten.

People with this name include:

- Kyung-ja Chun (1924–2015), South Korean painter
- Choi Kyong-ja (born 1930s), South Korean table tennis player who won several medals between 1957 and 1964
- Na Moon-hee (born Na Kyung-ja, 1941), South Korean actress
- Yi Kyoung-ja (born 1948), South Korean writer
- An Gyeong-ja (born 1950), South Korean volleyball player
- Byon Kyung-ja (born 1956), South Korean former volleyball player
- Lee Kyung-ja (born 1964), South Korean speed skater
- Moon Gyeong-ja (born 1965), South Korean former basketball player
- Kim Gyeong-ja (born 1970), one of the hostages in the 2007 South Korean hostage crisis in Afghanistan
- Cho Kyung-ja, South Korean table tennis player

== See also ==
- List of Korean given names
