= Jiyun (disambiguation) =

The Jiyun is a Chinese rime dictionary published in 1037 during the Song dynasty.

Jiyun, Ji-yun, or Ji Yun may also refer to:

- Ji Yun (1724–1805), Chinese scholar during the Qing dynasty
- Revised Romanisation spelling of the Korean name Ji-yoon
- Alternative customary spelling of the Korean name Ji-yeon (name)
