= Ji-young =

- Hangul: 지영
- RR: Jiyeong
- MR: Chiyŏng
- IPA: [tɕijʌŋ]

Ji-young, also spelled Jee-young, Ji-yeong, or Chi-young, is a Korean given name. It was the most popular name for baby girls born in South Korea in 1970, falling to third place in 1980 and tenth place in 1990.

People with this name include:

== Athletes ==
- Mo Ji-yeong (born 1964), South Korean male field hockey player
- Pearl Sinn (born Sinn Ji-young, 1967), South Korean-born American female golfer
- Lee Ji-young (field hockey) (born 1971), South Korean female field hockey player
- Lee Jee-young (born 1985), South Korean female golfer
- Lee Ji-young (baseball) (born 1986), South Korean male baseball player
- Oh Ji-young (born 1988), South Korean female volleyball player
- Oh Ji-young (golfer) (born 1988), South Korean female golfer
- Lee Ji-young (swimmer) (born 1989), South Korean female swimmer

== Entertainers ==
- Kim Ji-young (actress, born 1938), South Korean actress
- Park Ji-young (actress) (born 1969), South Korean actress
- Kim Ji-young (actress, born 1974), South Korean actress
- Baek Ji-young (born 1976), South Korean female pop and ballad singer
- Kim Ji-yeong (voice actress) (born 1976), South Korean voice actress
- Kahi (singer) (born Park Ji-young, 1980), South Korean pop singer and actress
- Seo Ji-young (born 1981), South Korean pop singer, member of girl group Sharp
- Lee Hae-in (actress) (born Lee Ji-young, 1986), South Korean actress
- Kang Ji-young (born 1994), South Korean female idol singer, member of girl group Kara
- Ahn Ji-young (born 1995), South Korean female singer, member of duo Bolbbalgan4
- Kim Ji-young (actress, born 2005), South Korean actress
- Rhee Ji-yeong (fl. 2000s), South Korean voice actress

== Others ==
- Chung Ji-young (born 1949), South Korean male novelist
- Gong Ji-young (born 1963), South Korean female novelist
- Boo Ji-young (born 1971), South Korean female filmmaker
- Jeannie Chi-Young Suk (born 1973), South Korean-born American female law professor
- Ji-Young Kim (born 1978), South Korean ballerina
- JeeYoung Lee (born 1983), South Korean female visual artist
- Lim Ji-young (born 1995), South Korean female violinist
- Jiyeong Mun (born 1995), South Korean female classical pianist
- Chi-young Kim, South Korean-born American male literary translator

== Fictional characters ==
- Kim Ji-young, the title character of the 2016 novel Kim Ji-young, Born 1982
- Na Ji-young, the title character of the 2017 television series Individualist Ms. Ji-young
- Ji-yeong, a recurring character in the 2021 television series Squid Game
- Ji-Young, a Sesame Street Muppet introduced in 2021

== See also ==
- List of Korean given names
