= Mi-young =

- Hangul: 미영
- RR: Miyeong
- MR: Miyŏng

Mi-young, also spelled as Mee-young, Mi-yeong, and Mi-yong is a Korean given name. It was the seventh-most popular name for newborn girls in South Korea in 1960, falling to tenth place by 1970.

== People ==
People with this name include:

=== Entertainers ===
- Lee Mi-young (actress) (born 1961), South Korean actress
- Tiffany Hwang (Korean name Hwang Mi-young, born 1989), American-born singer in South Korea, member of Girls' Generation

=== Sportspeople ===
- Go Mi-young (1967–2009), South Korean mountaineer
- Lee Mi-young (handballer) (born 1969), South Korean handballer
- Song Mi-young (born 1975), South Korean handballer
- Gang Mi-yeong (born 1978), South Korean speed skater
- Lee Mi-young (athlete) (born 1979), South Korean shot putter
- Park Mi-young (table tennis) (born 1981), South Korean table tennis player
- Kim Mi-yong (born 1983), North Korean table tennis player
- Kim Min-seo (badminton) (born Kim Mi-young, 1987), South Korean badminton player

=== Other ===
- Ryu Mi-yong (born 1921), chairwoman of North Korea's Chondoist Chongu Party
- Toni Ko (Korean name Ko Mi-young; born 1973), South Korean-born American cosmetics businesswoman
- Angela Hur (Korean name Hur Mi-young; born 1980), American writer of Korean descent
- Miyong Kim, South Korean-born American professor of nursing
- Mi-Young Park (born 1948), Korean-American violinist

== See also ==
- List of Korean given names
