= Choi Eun-yeong =

Choi Eun-yeong (최은영) may refer to:

- Choi Eun-young (born 1984), South Korean novelist
- Choi Eun-young (field hockey) (born 1985), South Korean field hockey player
- Eunyoung Choi, South Korean animator
