= Chunja =

Chunja or Chun-ja may refer to:

- Chunja, Rapti, village in Nepal
- Chunja (singer), South Korean singer
- Chun-ja (name), Korean given name
