= Kim Min-seo (disambiguation) =

Kim Min-seo (born 1984) is a South Korean actress.

Kim Min-seo (Korean: 김민서) may also refer to:

- Kim Min-seo (badminton) (born 1985 as Kim Mi-young), South Korean female badminton player
- Kim Min-seo (born 1996) better known by stage name Minseo, South Korean singer
- Kim Min-seo (born 1997) better known by stage name Saya, South Korean singer
- Kim Min-seo (actress, born 2009), South Korean child actress
- Kim Min-seo (singer, born 2004), known mononymously as Minseo, South Korean singer and dancer, member of Wooah

== See also ==
- Kim (Korean surname)
- Min-seo, a Korean given name
