= Kim Jun-ho =

Kim Jun-ho (Korean: 김준호) is a Korean name consisting of the family name Kim and the given name Joon-ho, and may also refer to:

- Kim Jun-ho (comedian) (born 1975), South Korean comedian
- Kim Jun-ho (sport shooter) (born 1959), North Korean sports shooter
- Juno (singer) (born 1986), South Korean singer
- Kim Jun-ho (fencer) (born 1994), South Korean fencer
- Kim Jun-ho (speed skater) (born 1995), South Korean speed skater
- Kim Jun-ho (footballer) (born 2002), South Korean footballer
