= Son Jun-ho =

Son Jun-ho (Korean: 손준호) is a Korean name consisting of the family name Son and the given name Jun-ho, and may also refer to:

- Son Jun-ho (actor) (born 1983), South Korean actor
- Son Jun-ho (footballer) (born 1992), South Korean footballer
