= Seo Ji-hoon =

Seo Ji-hoon or Seo Ji-hun (Korean: 서지훈) is a Korean name consisting of the family name Seo and the given name Ji-hoon, and may refer to:

- Seo Ji-hun (gamer) (born 1985), South Korean video game player
- Seo Ji-hoon (actor) (born 1997), South Korean actor
