= Kim Sun-young =

- Hangul: 김선영
- RR: Gim Seonyeong
- MR: Kim Sŏnyŏng

Kim Sun-young, Kim Seon-young or Kim Seon-yeong (Korean: 김선영) is a Korean name consisting of the family name Kim and the given name Sun-young, and may also refer to:

- Kim Sun-young (actress, born 1976), South Korean actress
- Kim Seon-young (judoka) (born 1979), South Korean judoka
- Kim Sun-young (actress, born 1980), South Korean actress
- Kim Seon-yeong (curler) (born 1993), South Korean curler
