= Haeun =

Haeun can refer to:

- Haeun (Jeungsando), a principle of the Jeungsando faith.
- Ch'oe Ch'iwŏn, a Silla philosopher sometimes known by his pen name Haeun
- Haeundae-gu, Busan
- Kim Hae-woon (born 1973), South Korean footballer
- Ha-eun, Korean given name
