= Park Jung-soo =

Park Jung-soo (Korean: 박정수) is a Korean name consisting of the family name Park and the given name Jung-soo, and may also refer to:

- Park Jung-soo (actress) (born 1953), South Korean actress
- Park Jung-soo (footballer) (born 1987), South Korean footballer
- Park Jung-soo, birth name of the singer Leeteuk in the South Korean band Super Junior
