= Kyung-hee =

- Hangul: 경희
- RR: Gyeonghui
- MR: Kyŏnghŭi

Kyung-hee, also spelled Kyong-hui or Gyong-hui, is a Korean given name. Kyung-hee was the ninth-most popular name for baby girls in South Korea in 1950, rising to third place by 1960.

People with this name include:

== Arts and entertainment ==
- Hong Kyung-hee (born 1954), South Korean sculptor
- Lee Kyung-hee (born 1969), South Korean television screenwriter
- Grace Lee (Korean name Lee Kyung-hee; born 1982), South Korean television host in the Philippines

== Sport ==
- Lee Gyeong-hui (born 1958), South Korean speed skater
- Choi Kyung-hee (born 1966), South Korean basketball player
- Li Gyong-hui (cross-country skier) (born 1967), North Korean skier
- Yang Gyeong-hui (born 1971), South Korean sprinter
- Li Gyong-hui (born 1972), North Korean gymnast
- Yang Kyong-hui (born 1978), North Korean football defender
- Choi Gyeong-hui (born 1981), South Korean long-distance runner who competed at the 2004 Summer Olympics
- Lim Kyung-hee (born 1982), South Korean long-distance runner who competed at the 2012 Summer Olympics
- Jon Kyong-hui (born 1986), North Korean long-distance runner

== Other ==
- Kim Kyong-hui (born 1946), North Korean politician, younger sister of Kim Jong-il

== Fictional characters ==
- Kim Gyeong-hui, in 2002 South Korean film Lovers' Concerto
- Do Kyung-hee, played by Kim Ji-min, is the younger sister of lead male Do Kyung-seok, played by Cha Eun-woo, in 2018 South Korean television series Gangnam Beauty

== See also ==
- List of Korean given names
