= Jeon Hye-jin =

Jeon Hye-jin (Korean: 전혜진) is a Korean name consisting of the family name Jeon and the given name Hye-jin, and may also refer to:

- Jeon Hye-jin (actress, born 1970) (born 1970), South Korean actress
- Jeon Hye-jin (actress, born 1976) (born 1976), South Korean actress
- Jeon Hye-jin (actress, born 1988) (born 1988), South Korean actress
