= Eun-young =

- Hangul: 은영
- RR: Eunyeong
- MR: Ŭnyŏng
- IPA: [ɯnjʌŋ]

Eun-young, also spelled Eun-yeong is a Korean given name. It was the eighth-most popular name for baby girls born in South Korea in 1980.

People with this name include:

== Sportspeople ==
- Nam Eun-young (born 1970), South Korean team handball player
- Cho Eun-young (born 1972), South Korean sport shooter
- Lee Eun-young (field hockey) (born 1974), South Korean field hockey player
- Lee Eun-young (taekwondo) (fl. 1987–1989), South Korean taekwondo athlete

== Entertainers ==
- WoongSan (born Kim Eun-young, 1973), South Korean jazz musician
- Cheetah (rapper) (born Kim Eun-young, 1990), South Korean rapper
- Ben (South Korean singer) (born Lee Eun-young, 1991), South Korean singer

== Other ==
- Choi Eun-young (born 1984), South Korean writer

== Fictional characters ==
- Eun-yeong, lead character of the 2008 South Korean film Beautiful
- Ahn Eun-young, titular character of the 2020 South Korean drama The School Nurse Files
- Eun-yeoung Baek, secondary main character of the manhwa No Home

== See also ==
- List of Korean given names
