= Kim Ji-young =

- Hangul: 김지영
- RR: Gim Jiyeong
- MR: Kim Chiyŏng

Kim Ji-young or Kim Ji-yeong is a Korean name and may refer to:

== People ==
- Kim Ji-young (actress, born 1938) (1938–2017), South Korean actress
- Kim Ji-young (actress, born 1974), South Korean actress
- Kim Ji-yeong (voice actress) (born 1976), South Korean voice actress
- Ji-young Kim (born 1978), South Korean ballerina
- Kim Ji-young (actress, born 2005), South Korean actress
- Kim Ji-young (gymnast), South Korean gymnast
- Chi-young Kim, Korean English literary translator

== Works ==
- Kim Ji-young, Born 1982, a 2016 South Korean novel
  - Kim Ji-young, Born 1982 (film), a 2019 South Korean film based on the novel
