= Chun-ja (name) =

- Hangul: 춘자
- RR: Chunja
- MR: Ch'unja

Chun-ja is a Korean given name.

== Hanja and meaning ==
Chun-ja is one of a number of Japanese-style names ending in "ja" (子), like Young-ja and Jeong-ja, that were popular when Korea was under Japanese rule, but declined in popularity afterwards. According to South Korean government data, Chun-ja was the fourth-most popular name for newborn girls in 1945, with nine out of the top ten names for girls that year ending in "ja". However, by 1950 there were no names ending in "ja" in the top ten.

== People ==
People with this name include:

- Ryom Chun-ja (born 1942), North Korean volleyball player
- Ryoo Choon-za (born 1943), North Korean speed skater
- Yu Chun-ja (born 1945), South Korean volleyball player
- Chunja (singer), (born Hong Su-yeon, 1979), South Korean singer
- Lee Chae-won (born Lee Chun-ja, 1981), South Korean cross country skier

== See also ==
- List of Korean given names
- Chunja's Happy Events, 2008 South Korean television series
