= Hyun-jun =

- Hangul: 현준
- RR: Hyeonjun
- MR: Hyŏnjun
- IPA: [çʌndʑun]

Hyun-jun, also spelled Hyun-joon, Hyeon-jun, Hyeon-joon, Hyon-jun, or Hyon-joon, is a Korean given name. It previously ranked as the eighth-most popular name for newborn boys in South Korea, with 1,636 being given the name in 2008 and 1,681 in 2009.

People with this name include:

== Entertainers ==
- Shin Hyun-joon (actor) (born 1968), South Korean actor
- Nam Hyun-joon (born 1979), South Korean rapper
- June (singer) (born Joo Hyun-joon, 1987), South Korean singer
- Hur Hyun-jun (born 2000), South Korean singer and actor

== Sportspeople ==
- Kim Hyun-jun (1960–1999), South Korean basketball player
- Son Hyun-jun (born 1972), South Korean football player
- Shin Hyun-joon (footballer) (born 1983), South Korean football player
- Lim Hyun-jun (born 1988), South Korean baseball player
- Suk Hyun-jun (born 1991), South Korean football player
- Kim Hyeon-jun (born 1992), South Korean sport shooter
- Ku Hyun-jun (born 1993), South Korean football player
- Hwang Hyeon-jun (born 1997), South Korean curler

== Others ==
- Shin Hyun-joon (general) (1915–2007), South Korean general
- Han Hyun-jun (born 1960), South Korean businessman
- Dimo Hyun Jun Kim (born 1991), South Korean theatre director and producer
- Sebastian Seung (born Seung Seung Hyeon-jun), American physicist and neuroscientist

== Fictional characters ==
- Kim Hyun-jun, in 2009 South Korean television series Iris
- Park Hyun-joon, in 2013 South Korean television series Pots of Gold
