= Ji-hye =

- Hangul: 지혜
- RR: Jihye
- MR: Chihye
- IPA: [tɕihe]

Ji-hye, also spelled Jee-hye, or Ji-hae, is a Korean given name. It was the most popular name for newborn girls in South Korea in 1980, 1988, and 1990.

== People ==
People with this name include:

- Ryu Ji-hye (born 1976), South Korean table tennis player
- Yoon Ji-hye (born 1979), South Korean actress
- Lee Ji-hye (born 1980), South Korean singer and actress
- Han Ji-hye (born 1984), South Korean actress
- Lim Ji-hye (born 1985), South Korean weightlifter
- Seo Ji-hye (born 1984), South Korean actress
- Ji-Hae Park (born 1985), German-born South Korean violinist
- Wang Ji-hye (born 1985), South Korean actress
- Ahn Ji-hye (born 1987), South Korean actress
- Yun Ji-hye (taekwondo) (born 1997), South Korean taekwondo practitioner

== Fictional characters ==
Fictional characters with this name include:

- Choe Ji-hye, in 1992 South Korean film Marriage Story
- Ji-hye, in 2003 South Korean film The Classic
- Song Ji-hye, in 2013 South Korean television series Goddess of Marriage
- Lee Jihye, in 2018 South Korean web-novel Omniscient Reader's Viewpoint

== See also ==
- List of Korean given names
