= Jung-soon =

- Hangul: 정순
- RR: Jeongsun
- MR: Chŏngsun

Jung-soon, also spelled Jong-sun or Jeong-soon, is a Korean given name. According to South Korean government data, Jung-soon was the ninth-most popular name for newborn girls in Korea in 1945. It was the only one of the top ten names for girls not ending in "ja".

People with this name include:

- Yang Jeong-soon, South Korean tennis player, bronze medalist in Tennis at the 1966 Asian Games
- Song Jong-sun (born 1981), North Korean football defender

== See also ==
- List of Korean given names
