= Soon-ja =

- Hangul: 순자
- RR: Sunja
- MR: Sunja

Soon-ja, also spelled Sun-ja, is a Korean given name. According to South Korean government data it was the seventh-most popular name for baby girls in 1940. It is one of a number of Japanese-style names ending in "ja", like Young-ja and Jeong-ja, that were popular when Korea was under Japanese rule, but declined in popularity afterwards. By 1950 there were no names ending in "ja" in the top ten. The same characters correspond to a number of Japanese female given names, including the on'yomi reading Junko and the kun'yomi readings Ayako, Masako, Michiko, Nobuko, and Yoshiko.

People with this name include:

- Soon Ja Du (born 1940), South Korean-born American convenience store owner
- Jeong Sun-ja (born 1947), South Korean diver
- Kim Sun-ja (athlete) (born 1966), South Korean sprinter
- Lee Soon-ja (born 1939), South Korean former first lady, wife of Chun Doo-hwan
- Lee Sun-ja (born 1978), South Korean sprint canoer
- Park Soon-ja (born 1966), South Korean former field hockey player

== See also ==
- List of Korean given names
