= Sung-ho =

- Hangul: 성호
- RR: Seongho
- MR: Sŏngho

Sung-ho, also spelled Seong-ho, is a Korean given name. It was the sixth-most popular name for baby boys in South Korea in 1950, rising to first place in 1960, but was displaced from the top spot in 1970 by Ji-hoon.

People with this name include:

Entertainers

- Sung Kang (Korean name Kang Sung-ho, born 1972), American actor of Korean descent
- Park Seong-ho (comedian), (born 1974), South Korean comedian
- Park Sung-ho (Singer), (born 2003), South Korean Singer

Footballers

- Hong Sung-ho (born 1954), South Korean football goalkeeper
- Park Sung-ho (footballer) (born 1982), South Korean football forward
- Choo Sung-ho (born 1987), South Korean football defender

Other sportspeople

- Kim Seong-ho (born 1964), South Korean modern pentathlete
- Nam Sung-ho (born 1975), South Korean sprint canoer
- Jang Sung-ho (baseball) (born 1977), South Korean baseball first baseman and outfielder
- Jang Sung-ho (judoka) (born 1978), South Korean judoka
- No Sung-ho (born 1989), South Korean baseball pitcher

Other

- Kim Sung-Hou (born 1937), Korean-born American mathematician
- Seongho Cha, South Korean ballet dancer
- Sung-ho Choi, South Korean-born American artist
- Ji Seong-ho, North Korean defector

== See also ==
- List of Korean given names
