= Seo-hyeon =

- Hangul: 서현
- RR: Seohyeon
- MR: Sŏhyŏn
- IPA: [sʌçʌn]

Seo-hyun, also spelled Seo-hyeon, is a Korean given name. It was the 2nd-most popular name for baby girls in South Korea in 2011, and among the top 5 most popular name in 2008, 2009, 2011 and 2013 (see List of the most popular given names in South Korea).

People with this name include:

- Lee Seo-hyun (born 1973), South Korean Businesswoman, Chairman of Samsung Welfare Foundation
- Seo-hyun (born Seo Ju-hyun, 1991), South Korean singer and actress
- Katie Kim (born Kim Seo-hyeon, 1993), South Korean-born American singer
- Ahn Seo-hyun (born 2004), South Korean actress

== See also ==
- List of Korean given names
