= Seo-yeon =

- Hangul: 서연
- RR: Seoyeon
- MR: Sŏyŏn
- IPA: [sʌjʌn]

Seo-yeon, also spelled Seo-yun or Seo-yon, is a Korean given name. It was the 1st-most popular name for baby girls in South Korea in 2005, 2006, 2008, 2009, 2011, 2013, 2nd-most popular name in 2015 and 3rd-most popular name in 2017 (see List of the most popular given names in South Korea).

== People ==
People with this name include:

- Shim Seo-yeon (born 1989), South Korean football defender
- Lee Seo-yeon (born 2000), South Korean singer
- Yoon Seo-yeon (born 2003), South Korean singer, member of girl group TripleS
- Ji Seo-yeon (born 2005), South Korean figure skater

== Fictional characters ==
Fictional characters with this name include:

- Kim Seo-yeon, in 2009 South Korean television series Cain and Abel
- Lee Seo-yeon, in 2011 South Korean television series A Thousand Days' Promise
- Yang Seo-yeon, in 2012 South Korean film Architecture 101
- Jin Seo-yeon, antagonist in Korean MMORPG Blade & Soul

== See also ==
- List of Korean given names
