= Ji-woo =

- Hangul: 지우
- RR: Jiu
- MR: Chiu
- IPA: [tɕiu]

Ji-woo, also spelled Ji-u, or Ji-oo, is a Korean given name. In 2008, Ji-woo was the eighth-most popular name for newborn girls in South Korea, with 2,107 being given the name; it rose to fifth place in 2011, and subsequently to third place in 2013 and 2015.

== People ==
People with this name include:

- Hwang Ji-u (born 1952), South Korean poet
- Jung Ji-woo (born 1968), South Korean film director
- Choi Ji-woo (born Choi Mi-hyang, 1975), South Korean actress
- Park Ji-woo (born 1980), South Korean dancer
- Kim Ji-woo (born Kim Jeong-eun, 1983), South Korean actress
- Jeon Ji-woo (born 1996), South Korean singer and rapper, member of the co-ed group Kard
- Song Ji-woo (born 1997), South Korean actress
- Ji Woo (born Choi Ji-woo, 1997), South Korean actress
- Park Ji-woo (speed skater) (born 1998), South Korean speed skater
- Chuu (born Kim Ji-woo, 1999), South Korean singer, former member of the girl group Loona
- Jiwoo (born Kim Ji-woo, 2005), South Korean singer and rapper, member of the girl group Nmixx
- Lee Ji-woo (born 2005), South Korean singer, member of the girl group TripleS
- Jiwoo (born Choi Ji-woo, 2006), South Korean singer and rapper, leader of the girl group Hearts2Hearts

== Fictional characters ==
Fictional characters with this name include:

- Ji-woo, character in 2010 South Korean television series The Fugitive: Plan B
- Hwang Ji-woo, character in 2020 South Korean television series Men Are Men
- Han Ji-Woo, the original main protagonist of the Korean localization of Pokémon the Series, known in English as Ash Ketchum.

== See also ==
- List of Korean given names
