= Si-woo =

- Hangul: 시우
- RR: Siu
- MR: Siu
- IPA: [ɕiu]

Si-woo, also spelled Shi-woo, is a Korean given name. It was among the top 5 most popular name for newborn boys in South Korea in 2011, 2013 and 2017 (see List of the most popular given names in South Korea).

== People ==
People with this name include:

- Song Si-woo (born 1993), South Korean football midfielder
- Lee Si-woo (born 1994), South Korean volleyball player
- Kim Si-woo (born 1995), South Korean golfer
- Choi Si-woo (born 1996), South Korean sledge hockey player
- Kim Si-woo (born 1997), South Korean footballer
- Lee Si-woo (born 1997), South Korean actress and model
- Lee Si-woo (born 1999), South Korean actor

== Fictional characters ==
Fictional characters with this name include:

- Jung Shi-woo, in 2009 South Korean television series Soul
- Lee Si-woo, in 2012 South Korean television series Dream High 2
- Shi-woo, in 2013 South Korean television series The Blade and Petal
- Shi-woo, in 2014 South Korean television series My Lovely Girl
- Yoon Shi-woo, in 2016 South Korean television series Moorim School
- Hong Shi-woo, in 2020 South Korean television series 18 Again

== See also ==
- List of Korean given names
