= Yun-seo =

- Hangul: 윤서
- RR: Yunseo
- MR: Yunsŏ
- IPA: [junsʌ]

Yun-seo, also spelled Yun-suh, or Yoon-seo, Yoon-suh, is a Korean given name. It was among the top 10 most popular name for newborn girls in South Korea in 2008, 2009, 2011 and 2013 (see List of the most popular given names in South Korea).

People with this name include:

- Kim Yoon-seo (born 1986), South Korean actress
- Jo Yun-seo (born 1993), South Korean actress sometimes credited mononymously as Yoon Seo
- Roh Yoon-seo (born 2000), South Korean actress

Fictional characters with this name include:

- Kim Yoon-seo, in 2006 South Korean film Forbidden Quest
- Jung Yoon-seo, in 2010 South Korean television series Gloria
- Kang Yoon-seo, in 2011 South Korean television series Baby Faced Beauty
- Cha Yoon-seo, in 2013 South Korean television series Good Doctor

== See also ==
- List of Korean given names
