= Eun-seo =

- Hangul: 은서
- RR: Eunseo
- MR: Ŭnsŏ
- IPA: [ɯnsʌ]

Eun-seo, also spelled Eun-suh, or Eun-so, Un-seo, is a Korean given name. It was the 10th-most popular name for baby girls born in South Korea in 2011, 2013 (see List of the most popular given names in South Korea).

== People ==
- Son Eun-seo (born 1986), South Korean actress
- Oh Eun-seo (born 2017), South Korean actress

=== Fictional ===
- Choi Eun-suh, in 2000 South Korean television series Autumn in My Heart
- Park Un-seo, in 1999 South Korean film The Ring Virus
- Oh Eunseo, in a 2016 - 2019 South Korean Comic Killing Stalking

== See also ==
- List of Korean given names
