= Jung-nam =

- Hangul: 정남
- RR: Jeongnam
- MR: Chŏngnam
- IPA: [t͡ɕʌŋnam]

Jung-nam, also spelled Jeong-nam or Jong-nam, is a Korean given name. According to South Korean government data, Jung-nam was the eighth-most popular name for newborn boys in 1945.

== People ==
People with this name include:

=== Entertainers ===
- Bae Jung-nam (born 1983), South Korean model and TV personality

=== Sportspeople ===
- Baek Jeong-nam (1936–2005), South Korean basketball player
- Kim Jung-nam (born 1943), South Korean football manager
- Kim Jeong-nam (rower) (born 1963), South Korean rower
- Go Jung-nam (born 1975), South Korean fencer
- Yoo Jung-nam (born 1983), South Korean swimmer
- Hong Jeong-nam (born 1988), South Korean footballer

=== Other ===
- Son Jong-nam (1958–2008), North Korean defector and Christian missionary
- Jang Jong-nam (born 1960s), North Korean general
- Kim Jong-nam (1971–2017), eldest son of former North Korean leader Kim Jong-il
- Mun Jong-nam, North Korean diplomat

== See also ==
- List of Korean given names
