= Myung-sook =

- Hangul: 명숙
- RR: Myeongsuk
- MR: Myŏngsuk

Myung-sook, also spelled Myeong-sook or Myong-suk, is a Korean given name. Myung-sook was the fifth-most popular name for newborn girls in South Korea in 1950.

People with this name include:

- Han Myeong-sook (born 1944), South Korea's first female prime minister
- Kim Myong-suk (born 1947), North Korean volleyball player
- Paek Myong-suk (born 1954), North Korean volleyball player
- Kimshin Myongsuk (born 1961), South Korean feminist activist
- Jong Myong-suk (born 1993), North Korean wrestler

Fictional characters with this name include:

- Myung-sook, character portrayed by Bang Eun-hee in 2004–2005 South Korean television series Precious Family

== See also ==
- List of Korean given names
