= Seo-jun =

- Hangul: 서준
- RR: Seojun
- MR: Sŏjun
- IPA: [sʌdʑun]

Seo-jun, also spelled Seo-joon, or Suh-jun, Suh-joon, is a Korean given name. It was the 6th-most popular name for baby boys in South Korea in 2011, 2nd-most popular name in 2013, 2015, and 3rd-most popular name in 2017 (see List of the most popular given names in South Korea).

People with this name include:

- Park Seo-joon (born 1988), South Korean actor
- Kim Seo-jun (footballer) (born 1989), South Korean footballer

== See also ==
- List of Korean given names
