= Ha-joon =

- Hangul: 하준
- RR: Hajun
- MR: Hajun

Ha-joon is a Korean given name. It was the third-most popular name for newborn boys in South Korea in 2015, with 3,007 being given the name, and rose to second place in the first nine months of 2017, with 2,084 being given the name.

Notable people with this name include:

- Ha-Joon Chang (born 1963), South Korean economist
- Seo Ha-joon (born Son Jong-su, 1989), South Korean actor
- Wi Ha-joon (born 1991), South Korean actor
- Lee Ha-joon (born 1994), member of indie rock band The Rose

== See also ==
- List of Korean given names
