= Dong-hyun =

- Hangul: 동현
- RR: Donghyeon
- MR: Tonghyŏn

Dong-hyun, also spelled Dong-hyeon, is a Korean given name. It has been a popular name for a few decades. In 1980, Dong-hyun was the eighth-most popular name for baby boys in South Korea, while in 1990 it came in ninth place. In the early 2000s it rose even higher in popularity, but then fell back down again. In 2008, 1,571 South Korean baby boys were given the name "Dong-hyun", making it the tenth-most popular name.

== People ==
People with this name include:

=== Entertainers ===
- MC Mong (born Shin Dong-hyun, 1979), South Korean entertainer
- Kim Dong-hyun (actor) (born 1989), South Korean actor and singer, member of boy band Boyfriend
- Samuel Seo (born Seo Dong-hyeon, 1991), South Korean singer
- Gong Myung (born Kim Dong-hyeon, 1994), South Korean actor
- Lee Do-hyun (born Lim Dong-hyun, 1995), South Korean actor
- MC Gree (born Kim Dong-hyeon, 1998), South Korean rapper
- Kim Dong-hyun (singer, born 1998), South Korean singer, member of boy band AB6IX
- Kim Donghyun (born 2004), stage name Leehan, South Korean singer, member of BoyNextDoor
- Lee Donghyeon (born 2007), South Korean singer, member of KickFlip

=== Footballers ===
- Cho Dong-hyun (born 1951), South Korean football manager
- Kim Dong-hyun (footballer, born 1984), South Korean football player
- Seo Dong-hyeon (born 1985), South Korean football player
- Yang Dong-hyun (born 1986), South Korean football player
- Lee Dong-hyun (footballer) (born 1989), South Korean football player
- Hong Dong-hyun (born 1991), South Korean football player
- Do Dong-hyun (born 1993), South Korean football player

=== Other sportspeople ===
- Dong Hyun Kim (born 1981), South Korea mixed martial artist
- Lee Dong-hyun (born 1983), South Korean baseball player
- Kim Dong-hyun (bobsleigh) (born 1987), South Korean bobsledder
- Jung Dong-hyun (born 1988), South Korean alpine skier
- Im Dong-hyun (born 1989), South Korean archer
- Shin Dong-hyen (born 1989), South Korean artistic gymnast
- Kim Dong-hyeon (luger) (born 1991), South Korean luger

=== Other ===
- Yun Tong-hyon, North Korean politician

== See also ==
- List of Korean given names
