= Seong-su =

- Hangul: 성수
- RR: Seongsu
- MR: Sŏngsu

Sung-soo, also spelled as Seong-soo, Seong-su, or Song-su, is a Korean given name. It was the third-most popular name for baby boys in South Korea in 1950, falling to seventh place in 1960.

People with this name include:

- Kim Seong-su (1891–1955), Korean independence activist
- Kim Sung-su (director) (born 1961), South Korean film director
- Doha Kang (born Kang Seong-su, 1969), South Korean manhwa artist
- Park Sung-soo (born 1970), South Korean archer
- Kim Sung-soo (actor) (born 1975), South Korean actor
- Kim Seong-soo (footballer) (born 1992), South Korean football midfielder (K League 2)
- Hwang Song-su (born 1987), Zainichi Korean football midfielder and forward (J1 League)
- Eun Seong-soo (born 1993), South Korean football midfielder (K League 1)
- Park Seong-su (born 1996), South Korean football goalkeeper (J2 League)

== See also ==
- List of Korean given names
