= Do-hyun =

- Hangul: 도현
- RR: Dohyeon
- MR: Tohyŏn

Do-hyun, also spelled Do-hyeon, is a Korean given name. Do-hyun was the ninth-most popular name for newborn boys in South Korea in 2008, fell out of the top ten in 2009, and returned to tenth place in 2011.

People with this name include:

- Ahn Do-hyun (born 1961), South Korean poet
- Yoon Do-hyun (born 1972), South Korean singer, member of rock band YB
- Kim Do-hyun (born 1994), South Korean football player
- Oh Do-hyun (born 1994), South Korean football player
- Lee Do-hyun (born 1995), South Korean actor
- Pine (gamer) (born Kim Do-hyeon, 1997), South Korean professional Overwatch player

== See also ==
- List of Korean given names
