= Seo-yun =

- Hangul: 서윤
- RR: Seoyun
- MR: Sŏyun
- IPA: [sʌjun]

Seo-yun, also spelled Seo-yoon, Suh-yoon, or Suh-yun, is a South Korean given name. It was the 1st-most popular name for baby girls in South Korea in 2015, 2nd-most popular name in 2013 and 2017, and it was among the top 5 most popular name for newborn girls in 2008, 2009 and 2011 (see List of the most popular given names in South Korea).

Notable people with the name include:

- Annie Moon (Moon Seo-yoon, born 2002), South Korean singer and rapper

== See also ==
- List of Korean given names
