= Mi-kyung =

- Hangul: 미경
- RR: Migyeong
- MR: Migyŏng

Mi-kyung or Mi-kyoung, also spelled Mi-gyeong or Mi-gyong is a Korean given name. It was South Korea's most popular name for baby girls in 1968.

== People ==
People with this name include:

Artists and writers

- Jung Mikyung (born 1960), South Korean novelist
- Yun Mi-kyung (born 1980), South Korean manhwa artist
- Mikyoung Kim, American landscape architect of Korean descent

Entertainers

- Won Mi-kyung (born 1960), South Korean actress
- Yang Mi-kyung (born 1961), South Korean actress
- Kim Mi-kyung (born 1963), South Korean actress
- Mikyung Sung (born 1993), South Korean classical musician

Sportspeople

- Kim Mi-gyeong (athlete) (born 1967), South Korean long-distance runner
- Lim Mi-kyung (born 1967), South Korean team handball player
- Yun Mi-gyeong (born 1968), South Korean sprinter
- Lee Mi-kyung (sport shooter) (born 1969), South Korean sport shooter
- Chang Mi-kyung (born 1973), South Korean fencer
- Chun Mi-kyung (born 1973), South Korean fencer
- Park Mee-kyung (born 1975), South Korean volleyball player
- Ri Mi-gyong (born 1990), North Korean table tennis player
- Kim Mi-gyong (born 1991), North Korean long-distance runner
- Lee Mi-gyeong (handballer) (born 1991), South Korean handball player

== See also ==
- List of Korean given names
