= Soon-hee =

- Hangul: 순희
- RR: Sunhui
- MR: Sunhŭi

Soon-hee, also spelled Sun-hui, is a Korean given name. According to South Korean government data, it was the ninth-most popular name for newborn girls in Korea in 1940.

People with this name include

- Han Sun-hi (born 1955), North Korean archer
- Boo Soon-hee (born 1967), South Korean sport shooter
- Kim Soon-hee (born 1977), South Korean weightlifter
- Kye Sun-hui (born 1979), North Korean judoka
- Ho Sun-hui (born 1980), North Korean football midfielder and referee
- Soon Hee Newbold, South Korean-born American composer, conductor, musician, and actress

Fictional characters with this name include:

- Kim Soon-hee, female protagonist in 1980s North Korean film series Unsung Heroes

== See also ==
- List of Korean given names
