= Ji-min =

- Hangul: 지민
- RR: Jimin
- MR: Chimin

Ji-min, also spelled Jee-min, is a unisex Korean given name. Ji-min was South Korea's third-most popular name for baby girls in 2008, with 2,792 being given the name.

People with this name include:

== Actresses ==
- Yoon Ji-min (born Yoon Ji-young, 1977), South Korean actress
- Han Ji-min (born 1982), South Korean actress
- Kim Ji-min (comedian) (born 1984), South Korean comedian and actress
- Kwak Ji-min (born Kwak Sun-hee, 1985), South Korean actress
- Kim Ji-min (actress) (born 2000), South Korean actress

== Musicians ==
- J-Min (born Oh Ji-min, 1988), South Korean singer
- Shin Ji-min (born 1991), South Korean rapper
- Jimin (born Park Ji-min, 1995), South Korean singer and dancer, member of boy band BTS
- Jamie (born Park Ji-min, 1997), South Korean singer
- Karina (born Yu Ji-min, 2000), South Korean singer, member of girl group Aespa

== Sportspeople ==
- Kang Ji-min (born 1980), South Korean golfer
- Lee Ji-min (born 1983), South Korean football player
- Kim Ji-min (footballer, born 1984), South Korean football player
- Ha Jee-min (born 1989), South Korean sailor
- An Ji-min (born 1992), South Korean speed skater
- Kim Ji-min (footballer, born 1993), South Korean football player
- Park Ji-min (footballer) (born 2000), South Korean football player

== See also ==
- List of Korean given names
