= Soo-bin =

- Hangul: 수빈
- RR: Subin
- MR: Subin

Soo-bin, also spelled Su-bin, is a Korean given name. In 2008, Soo-bin was the 9th-most-popular given name for baby girls in South Korea, with 2,069 being given the name.

== People ==
People with this name include:

=== Entertainers ===
- Bae Soo-bin (born 1976), South Korean actor
- Chae Soo-bin (born 1994), South Korean actress
- Chung Su-bin (born 1998), South Korean actress
- Ha Soo-bin (born 1973), South Korean singer
- Park Subin (born 1994), South Korean singer
- Yang Soobin (born 1994), South Korean entertainer
- Soobin (born 2000), South Korean singer, member of boy group Tomorrow X Together

=== Sportspeople ===
- Choi Su-bin (born 1988), South Korean football player
- Choi Su-bin, South Korean female volleyball player
- Jung Soo-bin (born 1990), South Korean baseball player

=== Other ===
- Lee Soo-bin (born 1939), South Korean businessman
- Soovin Kim (born 1976), Korean American violinist

== See also ==
- List of Korean given names
- Chua Soo Bin (Chinese: 蔡斯民; pinyin: Cài Sīmín; born 1932), Singaporean photographer
- Soobin Hoàng Sơn (born September 10, 1992), Vietnamese singer
