= Young-soo =

- Hangul: 영수
- RR: Yeongsu
- MR: Yŏngsu

Young-soo, also spelled Young-su or Yeong-su, is a Korean given name. It was the second-most popular name for newborn boys in South Korea in 1960; this was part of a broader trend of giving boys names starting with the syllable "young" in the 1940s through the 1960s.

People with this name include:

- Kim Eung-hwan (1742–1789), courtesy name Yeongsu, Joseon Dynasty painter
- O Yeong-su (1909–1979), South Korean writer
- Yuk Young-soo (1925–1974), wife of South Korean dictator Park Chung-hee
- John Choi Young-su (1942–2009), South Korean Archbishop of the Roman Catholic Archdiocese of Daegu
- Yun Young-su (born 1952), South Korean female writer
- Chun Young-soo (born 1963), South Korean football player
- An Young-su (born 1964), South Korean amateur boxer
- YoungSoo Kim (born 1978), South Korean chemist
- Im Yong-su (born 1980), North Korean weightlifter
- Bae Young-soo (born 1981), South Korean baseball pitcher (Korea Baseball Organization)
- Shin Young-soo (born 1982), South Korean volleyball player

== See also ==
- List of Korean given names
