= Kyung-soo =

- Hangul: 경수
- RR: Gyeongsu
- MR: Kyŏngsu

Kyung-soo, also spelled Kyoung-soo, is a Korean given name. According to South Korean government data, Kyung-soo was the seventh-most popular name for baby boys born in 1940.

People with this name include:

- Choi Gyeong-su (born 1945), South Korean wrestler
- Byun Kyung-soo (born 1958), South Korean sport shooter
- Kim Kyoung-soo (born 1967), South Korean politician
- Park Kyung-soo (born 1969), South Korean television screenwriter
- Lee Kyung-soo (born 1973), South Korean football defender
- Lee Gyeong-su (born 1979), South Korean volleyball player
- Ko Kyung-soo (born 1985), South Korean handball player
- D.O. (entertainer) (born Doh Kyung-soo, 1993), South Korean singer and actor, member of boy band Exo

Fictional characters with this name include:

- Kim Kyung-soo, in 2001 South Korean film Volcano High

== See also ==
- List of Korean given names
