= Jung-hee =

- Hangul: 정희
- RR: Jeonghui
- MR: Chŏnghŭi

Jung-hee, also spelled as Jeong-hee, Jeong-hui, Chung-hee, or Jong-hui, is a Korean given name. Jung-hee was the fourth-most popular name for newborn girls in South Korea in 1950, falling to sixth place by 1960.

People with this name include:

== Artists, scholars, and writers ==
- Kim Jeong-hui (1786–1856), Joseon dynasty male calligrapher
- Choe Jeong-hui (1912–1990), South Korean female writer
- Moon Chung-hee (born 1947), South Korean female poet
- Oh Jung-hee (born 1947), South Korean female writer
- Cheon Jung-hee, South Korean male mathematician
- Chunghee Sarah Soh, South Korean-born American sociocultural anthropologist

== Entertainers ==
- Yoon Jeong-hee (born Son Mi-ja, 1944), South Korean actress
- Jang Jung-hee (born 1958), South Korean actress
- Moon Jeong-hee (born 1976), South Korean actress
- Yoon Jung-hee (born 1980), South Korean actress
- Lee Jung-hee (born 1981), stage name Lee Jung, South Korean singer
- Lim Jeong-hee (born 1981), South Korean female R&B singer

== Politicians ==
- Park Chung Hee (1917–1979), South Korean male general and politician, leader of South Korea from 1963 until his death
- Lee Jung-hee (born 1969), South Korean female lawyer and politician

== Sportspeople ==
- Lee Jung-hee (born 1965), South Korean female gymnast
- Park Jeong-hui (born 1966), South Korean male judoka
- Park Jung-hee (sport shooter) (born 1967), South Korean male sport shooter
- Park Chung-hee (handballer) (born 1975), South Korean female handball player
- Ri Jong-hui (born 1975), North Korean female football goalkeeper
- Ji Jung-hee (born 1985), South Korean female volleyball player
- Cho Jung-hui (fl. 1980s), North Korean female table tennis player

== Others ==
- Lee Jeonghee (born 1963), South Korean female abacus master
- Chun Jung-hee (born 1983), South Korean male professional computer game player

== Fictional characters ==
- Ryeon Jung-hee, female character portrayed by Jeon Ji-hyun in 2013 South Korean film The Berlin File

== See also ==
- List of Korean given names
- Choi Jung-hui (최중희; born 1951), South Korean female speed skater
- Lee Chung-hee (basketball) (이충희; born 1959), South Korean male basketball player
- Lee Chung-hee (swimmer) (이충희; born 1981), South Korean male swimmer
- Kim Jong-hui (born 1980), North Korean female speed skater
- Yu Jong-hui (born 1986), North Korean female football defender
