= Sang-cheol =

- Hangul: 상철
- RR: Sangcheol
- MR: Sangch'ŏl

Sang-cheol, Sang-chul, or Sang-chol is a Korean given name. It was the 10th-most popular name for newborn boys in South Korea in 1950.

People with this name include:

== Sportspeople ==
- Lee Sang-cheol (born 1935), South Korean long-distance runner
- Seo Sang-cheol (judoka) (born 1944), South Korean judo practitioner
- Sang-chul Lee (taekwondo) (born 1948), South Korean-born American Taekwondo grandmaster
- Yoon Sang-chul (born 1965), South Korean football player
- Yoo Sang-chul (1971–2021), South Korean football player
- Park Sang-cheol (born 1984), South Korean football player

== Other ==
- Sang Chul Lee (1924–2017), United Church of Canada leader
- Suh Sang-chul (1935–1983), South Korean economist, educator and administrator

== See also ==
- List of Korean given names
