= Toshiko =

- Gender: Female

Origin
- Origin: Japanese
- Meaning: Different meanings depending on the kanji used

Toshiko is a feminine Japanese given name.

== Written forms ==
Forms in kanji can include:

- 敏子 "agile/clever, child"
- 俊子 "genius, child"
- 淑子 "graceful/polite, child"
- 寿子 "longevity, child"
- 年子 "year/age, child"
- 歳子 "age/time, child"
- 稔子 "humble, child"

The name can also be written in hiragana (としこ) or katakana (トシコ).

== People with the name ==
- Toshiko Abe (阿部 俊子; born 1959), Japanese politician
- Toshiko Akiyoshi (龝吉 敏子; born 1929), Japanese musician (jazz pianist, composer, arranger, bandleader)
- Toshiko D'Elia (1930–2014), American Masters athletics long-distance runner
- Toshiko Ezaki (江崎 とし子), Japanese singer and songwriter
- Toshiko Fujita (藤田 淑子; 1950–2018), Japanese voice actress
- Toshiko Hamayotsu (浜四津 敏子; born 1945–2020), Japanese politician of the New Komeito Party
- Toshiko Haruoka (春岡 淑子; born 1959), Japanese swimmer
- Toshiko Hayashi (林 紀子; 1940–2020), Japanese communist politician
- Toshiko Higashikuni (東久邇 聡子; 1896–1978), aka Princess Yasu aka Princess Toshiko, 9th daughter of the Japanese Emperor Meiji
- Toshiko Hirata (平田 俊子; born 1955), Japanese writer (poet)
- Toshiko Ishihara (石原 利子; born 1948), known as Nana Ozaki Japanese actress
- Toshiko Karasawa (柄沢 とし子; 1911–2013), Japanese politician
- Toshiko Kishida (岸田 俊子; 1863-1901), aka Toshiko Nakajima, Japanese feminist, writer (under the pen-name Shōen)
- Toshiko Kobayashi (小林 トシ子; 1932–2016), Japanese actress
- Toshiko Kobayashi (小林 トシ子; 1932–2016), Japanese actress
- Toshiko Kohno (born 1953 or 1954), Japanese flautist
- Toshiko Koshijima (こしじま としこ; born 1980), Japanese singer and member of Capsule
- Toshiko Kowada (小和田 敏子; born 1949), Japanese athlete (table tennis world champion, 1969)
- Toshiko MacAdam (born 1940), Japanese textile artist
- Toshiko Matsuo (松尾 トシ子; 1907–1993), Japanese politician
- Toshiko Mayeda (1923–2004) Japanese American chemist
- Toshiko Miyamoto (宮本 敏子; born 1954), Japanese gymnast
- Toshiko Mori (森 俊子; born 1951), Japanese-born American architect
- Toshiko Okanoue (岡上 淑子; born 1928), Japanese artist
- Toshiko Ono (小野 登志子; born 1944), Japanese Politician
- Toshiko Sade (born 1947), Japanese former professional tennis player
- Toshiko Sawada (沢田 敏子; born 1936), Japanese voice actress
- Toshiko Sekiya (関屋 敏子; 1904–1941), Japanese singer and composer
- Toshiko Shirasu-Aihara (白須-相原 俊子; born 1939), Japanese gymnast and 1964 Olympic medalist
- Toshiko Taira (平良 敏子; 1921–2022), Japanese textile artist
- Toshiko Takaezu (トシコ タカエズ; 1922–2011), Japanese American ceramic artist
- Toshiko Takeya (竹谷 とし子; born 1969), Japanese Senator
- Toshiko Tamura (田村 俊子; 1884–1945), Japanese novelist
- Toshiko Uchima (内間 俊子; 1918-2000), Japanese-American artist
- Toshiko Ueda (上田 トシコ; 1917–2008), Japanese manga artist
- Toshiko Yonekawa (米川 敏子; born 1955), Japanese musician (koto), Living National Treasure
- Toshiko Yuasa (湯浅 年子; 1909–1980), Japanese nuclear physicist

== Fictional characters ==
- Toshiko Kasen, a character in the Grand Theft Auto: Liberty City Stories video game
- Toshiko Sato, a protagonist in the television series Torchwood and briefly appeared in Doctor Who
