= Ji-ho =

- Hangul: 지호
- RR: Jiho
- MR: Chiho

Ji-ho, also spelled Chi-ho or Jie-ho, is a Korean given name. Ji-ho was the eighth-most popular name for newborn boys in South Korea in 2015, with 2,095 being given the name.

People with this name include:

Entertainers

- Kim Ji-ho (born 1974), South Korean actress
- Oh Ji-ho (born 1976), South Korean actor
- Choi Ji-ho (born 1980), South Korean actor
- Shim Ji-ho (born 1981), South Korean actor
- Song Ji-ho (born 1992), South Korean actor
- Zico (rapper) (born Woo Ji-ho, 1992), South Korean rapper, member of boy group Block B

Sportspeople

- Park Ji-ho (born 1970), South Korean football player
- Cha Ji-ho (born 1983), South Korean football player
- Ahn Ji-ho (footballer) (born 1987), South Korean football player
- Han Ji-ho (born 1988), South Korean football player
- Park Ji-ho (diver) (born 1991), South Korean diver

Other

- Shin Ji-ho (born 1963), South Korean politician
- Jieho Lee (born 1973), American filmmaker
- Jiho Lee (born 1985), South Korean model
- Chi-Ho Han (born 1992), South Korean pianist

== See also ==
- List of Korean given names
