= Choi Jung-hui =

South Korean speed skater

Personal information
- Full name: 최중희,崔重喜
- Nationality: South Korean
- Born: 2 December 1951 (age 73)

Sport
- Sport: Speed skating

Choi Jung-hui (born 2 December 1951) is a South Korean speed skater. She competed in three events at the 1972 Winter Olympics.
