= Miyong Kim =

American nurse researcher and academic

- Occupation(s): Nurse researcher and academic
- Employer: University of Texas at Austin

Korean name
- Hangul: 김미영
- RR: Gim Miyeong
- MR: Kim Miyŏng

Miyong Kim is an American nurse researcher and academic. She is the La Quinta Centennial Endowed Professor in the School of Nursing at the University of Texas at Austin.

== Biography ==
Kim was born in South Korea and came to the United States with her two sons when her husband, "Kim" Byung-tae Kim, began a Ph.D. in psychology at the University of Arizona. After earning a Ph.D. at the University of Arizona, Miyong Kim was on the faculty of the Johns Hopkins School of Nursing. She was named a fellow of both the American Heart Association and the American Academy of Nursing.

A 2005 alumna of the Robert Wood Johnson Foundation Executive Nurse Fellows program. Kim was promoted to full professor at Johns Hopkins in 2007. She directed the Center of Excellence for Cardiovascular Health of Vulnerable Populations at Johns Hopkins. In 2012, she was inducted into the Sigma Theta Tau International Nurse Researcher Hall of Fame.

In 2013, Kim was named the La Quinta Centennial Endowed Professor in the School of Nursing at the University of Texas at Austin, as well as the Associate Vice President for Community Health Engagement. In September 2014, Kim was selected to lead the school's NIH-funded Center in Self Management of Chronic Illness. She utilizes community-based participatory research (CBPR) to investigate health disparities among ethnic minorities.
