= Lim Hyun-jun =

South Korean baseball player (born 1988)

Lim Hyun-Jun
- Relief pitcher
- Born: December 21, 1988 (age 37)
- Batted: Left Threw: Left

KBO debut
- April 2, 2011, for the Samsung Lions

Last KBO appearance
- 2021, for the Samsung Lions

KBO statistics
- Win–loss record: 5–4
- Earned run average: 4.13
- Strikeouts: 106
- Stats at Baseball Reference

Teams
- Samsung Lions (2011, 2014–2021)

Lim Hyun-Jun (Korean: 임현준; Hanja: 林玄埈; born December 21, 1988, in Daegu) is a South Korean former relief pitcher who played for the Samsung Lions of the KBO League. He bats and throws left-handed. Lim is currently the only left-handed sidearm pitcher in the league.

== Amateur career ==
Lim played college baseball at Kyungsung University in Busan. As a freshman in 2007 he earned MVP honors at the President's Flag Championship, tossing a complete game shutout victory in the final game. Lim finished his first collegiate season with a record of 8–1 and an ERA of 1.61 in 67 innings pitched.

In April 2008, Lim was named to the preliminary 66-man South Korea national baseball team roster for the 2008 Beijing Olympic Games. He was one of the only six amateur players in the preliminary roster.

Lim fell into a slump due to injuries from 2008-2009 season. However, Lim bounced back in 2010 when he posted a record of 8–2 and an ERA of 2.58 in 104.2 innings pitched. Lim hurled 6 complete game (1 shutout) victories out of his 8 wins with 68 strikeouts, and helped his team to win the titles at the President's Flag Championship and the National Collegiate Championship, named MVP in both of the competitions.

== Professional career ==
Lim was drafted with the 29th overall pick of the 2011 KBO Draft by the Samsung Lions. As a rookie, he was selected for the Lions' Opening Day 26-man roster to replace Lions' top setup man Kwon Hyuk, who had been sidelined with injuries prior to the season. Lim made his pro league debut against the KIA Tigers on April 2, 2011, when Lim racked up his first win, pitching 1/3 of a scoreless inning. In April, Lim posted a 1.17 ERA, appearing in 13 games as a left-handed specialist. In May, however, Lim lost command of his pitches and the ERA dipped to over 3.00. In early June, Lim was finally demoted to the Lions' second-tier team as Kwon Hyuk came back from a disabled list.

=== Notable international careers ===
Year	Venue	Competition	Team	Individual Note
2011	Panama	Baseball World Cup	6th	0-1; 27.00 ERA (2 G, 0.2 IP, 2 ER, 0 K)
