= Rhee Ji-yeong =

South Korean voice actress

- Occupation: Voice actress
- Employer: On-Media

Korean name
- Hangul: 이지영
- RR: I Jiyeong
- MR: I Chiyŏng

Rhee Ji-young (Korean: 이지영) is a South Korean voice actress. She joined On-Media's voice acting division in 1995.

== Role ==
=== Broadcast TV ===
- Ouran High School Host Club (Korea TV Edition, Tooniverse) - Haruhi Fujioka
- Ashita no Nadja (Korea TV Edition, Tooniverse) - Nadja Applefield
- Fushigiboshi no Futagohime (Korea TV Edition, Tooniverse) - Rein
- Magical Girl Lyrical Nanoha (Korea TV Edition, Tooniverse) - Fate Testarossa
- Mr. Bogus (Korea Edition) - Tommy's Mom and Additional Voices
- Full Metal Panic? Fumoffu (Korea TV Edition, Tooniverse) - Teletha Tessa Testarossa
- Gals! (Korea TV Edition, Tooniverse) - Aya Hoshino
- Great Teacher Onizuka (Korea TV Edition, Tooniverse) - Azusa Fuyutsuki
- Midori Days (Korea TV Edition, Tooniverse) - Midori Kasugano
- Chrono Crusade (Korea TV Edition, Tooniverse) - Rosette Christopher
- Pita-Ten (Korea TV Edition, Tooniverse) - Shia
- Rockman EXE (Korea TV Edition, Tooniverse) - Rockman
- Air Master (Korea TV Edition, Tooniverse) - Mina Nakanotani
- UFO Baby (Korea TV Edition, Tooniverse) - Miyu Kōzuki
- Sugar Sugar Rune (Korea TV Edition, Tooniverse) - Cinnamon Meilleure
- Shugo Chara! (Korea TV Edition, Tooniverse) - Tadase Hotori
- Mahojin Guru Guru (Korea TV Edition, Tooniverse) - Juju / Toma
- To Heart (Korea TV Edition, Tooniverse) - Aoi Matsubara
- Fushigi Yuugi (Korea TV Edition, Tooniverse) - Soi
- Taruto (Korea TV Edition, Animax) - Chitose
- Widget (Korea TV Edition) - Christine, Additional Voices
- My Little Pony: Friendship Is Magic (Korea TV Edition Tooniverse) - Fluttershy

== See also ==
- On-Media Voice Acting Division
