= Hyun-sook =

- Hangul: 현숙
- RR: Hyeonsuk
- MR: Hyŏnsuk

Hyun-sook, also spelled Hyon-suk or Hyeon-sook, is a Korean given name. Hyun-sook was the sixth-most popular name for newborn girls in South Korea in 1950, falling to eighth place by 1960.

People with this name include:

- Chung Hyun-sook (born 1952), South Korean table tennis player
- Han Hyun-sook (born 1970), South Korean handball player
- Lee Hyeon-sook (born 1971), South Korean comics artist
- Kim Hyun-sook (born 1978), South Korean actress and comedian
- Ko Hyon-suk (born 1985), North Korean speed skater
- Pak Hyon-suk (born 1985), North Korean weightlifter
- Ri Hyon-suk (born 1989), North Korean volleyball player
- Goo Hyun-sook, South Korean television writer

== See also ==
- List of Korean given names
