= Jeong-ho =

- Hangul: 정호
- RR: Jeongho
- MR: Chŏngho

Jeong-ho, Jung-ho, or Jong-ho is a Korean given name. Jung-ho was a popular name for baby boys in South Korea in the mid-20th century, coming in fifth place in 1950, rising to fourth place in 1960, and falling to seventh place in 1970.

People with this name include:

- Kim Jeong-ho (1804–1866?), Joseon Dynasty geographer and cartographer
- Jung-Ho Pak (born 1962), American symphony conductor
- Hong Jeong-ho (born 1974), South Korean handball player
- Lee Jung-ho (born 1981), South Korean football player
- Kang Jung-ho (born 1987), South Korean baseball player
- Hong Jeong-ho (born 1989), South Korean football player

== See also ==
- List of Korean given names
