= Jung-hoon =

- Hangul: 정훈
- RR: Jeonghun
- MR: Chŏnghun

Jung-hoon, also spelled Jung-hun or Jeong-hun, is a Korean given name. It was a popular name for baby boys in South Korea in the mid-to-late 20th century, coming in tenth place in 1960, first place in 1970, and third place in 1980.

Notable people with this name include:

- Kim Jong-hun (footballer, born 1956), North Korean footballer
- Kang Jung-hoon (born 1976), South Korean footballer
- Yeon Jung-hoon (born 1978), South Korean actor
- Kim Jeong-hoon (born 1980), South Korean singer and actor
- Park Jung-hoon (footballer) (born 1988), South Korean footballer
- Kim Jung-hoon (footballer, born 1989), South Korean footballer
- Im Jung-hoon (born 1990), stage name J-Hoon, South Korean singer, member of B.I.G
- Kim Jeong-hoon (footballer, born 1991), South Korean football player
- Lee Jung-hoon (born 1991), stage name Yoon So-ho, South Korean actor
- Wang Jeung-hun (born 1995), South Korean golfer
- Moon Jung-hoon, South Korean paralympic athlete
- Lee Jung-hoon (born 2000), South Korean singer, former member of 1TEAM
- Han Jung-hoon (born 2000), formerly known as J-Kid, South Korean singer, former member of ENOi, current member of Omega X
- Kim Jung-hoon (born 2005), South Korean singer, current member of Xikers

== See also ==
- List of Korean given names
