= Chae-won =

- Hangul: 채원
- RR: Chaewon
- MR: Ch'aewŏn
- IPA: [tɕʰɛwʌn]

Chae-won is a Korean given name. It was the seventh-most-popular name for newborn girls in South Korea in 2013.

== People ==
People with this name include:

- Lee Chae-won (born 1981), South Korean cross-country skier
- Moon Chae-won (born 1986), South Korean actress
- So Chae-won (born 1997), South Korean archer
- Kim Chaewon (born 2000), South Korean singer, member of LE SSERAFIM
- Park Chaewon (born 2000), South Korean singer and actress, member of LOONA and former member of Loossemble
- Kim Chaewon (born 2007), South Korean singer, member of girl group TripleS

== Fictional characters ==
Fictional characters with this name include:

- Min Chae-won, in 2013 South Korean television series A Hundred Year Legacy

== See also ==
- List of Korean given names
