= Young-chul =

- Hangul: 영철
- RR: Yeongcheol
- MR: Yŏngch'ŏl

Young-chul, also spelled as Yeong-cheol or Yong-chol, is a Korean given name. According to South Korean government data, it was the eighth-most popular name for baby boys born in 1940, rising to fourth place by 1950.

== People ==
People with this name include:

=== Sportspeople ===
- Park Young-chul (born 1954), South Korean judoka
- Cha Young-chul (born 1959), South Korean sport shooter
- Lim Young-chul (born 1960), South Korean handball coach
- Jang Yeong-cheol (born 1964), South Korean sprint canoer
- Shin Young-chul (born 1964), South Korean volleyball player
- Park Yeong-cheol (born 1969), South Korean swimmer
- Kim Young-chul (footballer) (born 1976), South Korean football defender (K3 League)
- Back Young-chul (born 1978), South Korean football midfielder
- Cui Yongzhe (Korean name Choe Yeong-cheol, born 1987), Chinese football midfielder of Korean descent
- Jo Yong-chol (born 1987), North Korean sport shooter

=== Entertainers ===
- Kim Yeong-cheol (actor) (born 1953), South Korean actor
- Kim Young-chul (comedian) (born 1974), South Korean comedian
- Jang Young-chul (fl. 1994–present), South Korean television screenwriter

=== Other ===
- Kim Yong-chol (born 1946), North Korean general
- Hyon Yong-chol (1949–2015), North Korean general
- Yoo Young-chul (born 1970), South Korean serial killer who served as basis for the film The Chaser

== See also ==
- List of Korean given names
