= Kun-woo =

- Hangul: 건우
- RR: Geonu
- MR: Kŏnu

Kun-woo, also spelled Keon-woo or Gun-woo, is a Korean given name. It was the sixth-most popular name for baby boys born in South Korea in 2008, with 1,722 being given the name.

People with this name include:

- Lee Kunwoo (born 1955), South Korean engineer and academic
- Cho Gun-woo (born 1988), South Korean badminton player
- Kim Kun-woo (born 1980), South Korean track and field athlete
- Kim Kwon (born Kim Keon-woo, 1989), South Korean actor
- Lee Geon-u (born 2000), South Korean bobsledder
- Lee Gun-woo (born 1989), South Korean singer and actor, member of boy band Myname
- Kun-Woo Paik (born 1946), South Korean pianist
- Park Gun-woo (born 1981), South Korean Olympic sailing team member
- Park Keon-woo (born 1991), South Korean track cyclist

Fictional characters with this name include:

- Kang Gun-woo, in 2008 South Korean television series Beethoven Virus
- Min Gun-woo, in 2008 South Korean television series Temptation of Wife

== See also ==
- List of Korean given names
