= Jun-seo =

- Hangul: 준서
- RR: Junseo
- MR: Chunsŏ
- IPA: [tɕunsʌ]

Jun-seo, also spelled Joon-seo, or Joon-suh, Jun-suh, is a Korean given name. It was the fourth-most popular name for newborn boys in South Korea in 2008 and 2009.

== Singers ==
- Nakyoung (born Kim Jun-seo, 2002), South Korean singer, member of girl group TripleS

== See also ==
- List of Korean given names
