= Min-jun =

- Hangul: 민준
- RR: Minjun
- MR: Minjun
- IPA: [min.d͡ʑun]

Min-jun, also spelled Min-joon, is a Korean given name. It became the most popular name for baby boys in South Korea in 2004, and has held that position in most years since then. In 2008, a total of 2,641 baby boys were given this name. It was again most popular name for baby boys in South Korea in 2009, 2011, 2013, and 2015. One report attributed its ongoing popularity to characters named Min-jun in South Korean television drama series, in particular the 2013–2014 series My Love from the Star, where Kim Soo-hyun played a character named Do Min-jun. In addition, in 2010 it was also the most popular new name for adult men changing their names: there were 552 men who changed their names to Min-jun, especially from names which they felt were too old-fashioned.

People with this name include:

- Kim Min-jun (born 1976), South Korean actor and DJ
- Jun. K (born 1988), civil name Kim Min-jun, South Korean male singer, lead vocalist of boy band 2PM
- Hanseul (born 2001), civil name Park Min-jun, South Korean male singer, member of boy band Myteen

Fictional characters with this name include:

- Min-jun, in 2006 South Korean film Seducing Mr. Perfect
- Do Min-joon, in 2013–2014 South Korean series My Love from the Star
- Park Min-joon, in 2015 South Korean series Who Are You: School 2015

== See also ==
- List of Korean given names
