= Jun-hyeok =

- Hangul: 준혁
- RR: Junhyeok
- MR: Chunhyŏk

Jun-hyeok, Joon-hyuk, or Jun-hyok is a Korean given name.

People with this name include:

- Yang Joon-hyuk (born 1969), South Korean former baseball player and television personality
- Lee Jun-hyeok (actor, born 1972), South Korean actor
- Lee Joon-hyuk (actor, born 1984), South Korean actor
- Park Jun-hyuk (born 1987), South Korean footballer
- Jeon Jun-hyeok (born 2003), South Korean actor
- Kwak Jun-hyeok, South Korean political scientist
- Lim Junhyeok (born 1993) South Korean singer and keyboardist, formerly a member of Day6

== See also ==
- List of Korean given names
- Cho Jun-hyuk (born 1960), South Korean politician, whose given name is spelled Jeon-hyeok (전혁) in Revised Romanisation
