= Eun-ju =

- Hangul: 은주
- RR: Eunju
- MR: Ŭnju
- IPA: [ɯndʑu]

Eun-ju, also spelled Eun-joo or Un-joo, Un-ju, is a Korean given name. It was the sixth-most popular name for baby girls born in South Korea in 1970.

People with this name include:

== Sportspeople ==
- Im Eun-ju (runner) (born 1961), South Korean long-distance runner
- Im Eun-ju (born 1966), South Korean football referee and sports administrator
- Lee Eun-ju (sport shooter) (born 1970), South Korean sport shooter
- Ha Eun-ju (born 1986), South Korean swimmer
- Jung Eun-ju (born 1988), South Korean short track speed skater
- Kim Un-ju (born 1989), North Korean weightlifter
- Son Eun-ju (born 1990), South Korean track cyclist
- Choe Un-ju (born 1991), North Korean football player
- Kim Un-ju (footballer, born 1992), North Korean footballer
- Kim Un-ju (footballer, born 1993), North Korean footballer
- Kang Un-ju (born 1995), North Korean recurve archer
- Lee Eun-ju (gymnast) (born 1999), South Korean gymnast

== Entertainers ==
- Lee Eun-ju (1980–2005), South Korean actress
- Cho Eun-ju (born 1983), South Korean beauty pageant titleholder
- Go Joon-hee (born Kim Eun-joo, 1985), South Korean actress
- Jung Hye-sung (born Jung Eun-joo, 1991), South Korean actress
- Chyung Eun-ju (born 1993), South Korean beauty pageant titleholder

== Other ==
- Michelle Eunjoo Park Steel (born 1955), South Korean-born American politician

== Fictional characters ==
- Kim Eun-joo, in 2000 South Korean film Il Mare
- Heo Eun-joo, in 2003 South Korean film A Tale of Two Sisters
- Kim Eun-joo, in 2012 South Korean television series Missing You

== See also ==
- List of Korean given names
- People with the name spelled in Revised Romanization as Eon-ju (언주):
  - Lee Un-ju (born 1972), South Korean politician and lawyer
  - Lee Eun-ju (basketball) (born 1977), South Korean basketball player
