= Hyun-joo =

- Hangul: 현주
- RR: Hyeonju
- MR: Hyŏnju

Hyun-joo, also spelled Hyun-ju, is a Korean given name. Hyun-joo was the fourth-most popular name for baby girls born in South Korea in 1970.

People with this name include:

Sportspeople

- Sin Hyeon-ju (born 1934), South Korean sport shooter
- Lee Hyeon-ju (born 1953), South Korean figure skater
- Bang Hyun-joo (born 1966), South Korean sport shooter
- Lee Hyun-joo (volleyball) (born 1976), South Korean volleyball player
- Choi Hyeon-ju (born 1984), South Korean archer
- Kim Hyun-joo (swimmer) (born 1986), South Korean swimmer
- Jo Hyun-joo (born 1992), South Korean artistic gymnast
- Ri Hyon-ju (born 1996), North Korean diver

Entertainers

- Son Hyun-joo (born 1965), South Korean actor
- Kim Hyun-joo (born 1977), South Korean actress
- Han Ga-in (born Kim Hyun-joo, 1982), South Korean actress
- Gong Hyun-joo (born 1984), South Korean actress
- Jessi (musician) (born Ho Hyun-ju, 1988), American singer
- Lee Hyun-joo (actress) (born 1998), South Korean female actress and singer

Other

- Juju Chang (born Hyunju Chang, 1965), South Korean-born American female television journalist
- Grace Jung (born Jung Hyeon-ju, 1987), Korean-American writer

== See also ==
- List of Korean given names
