= Ha-yoon =

- Hangul: 하윤
- RR: Hayun
- MR: Hayun
- IPA: [hajun]

Ha-yoon is a Korean given name. Ha-yoon was the fifth-most popular name for newborn girls in South Korea in 2015, with 2,356 being given the name, and rose to first place in the first nine months of 2017.

People with this name include:

- Song Ha-yoon (born 1986), South Korean actress
- Ji Ha-yoon (born 1995), South Korean actress and model

== See also ==
- List of Korean given names
