= Byeong-cheol =

- Hangul: 병철
- RR: Byeongcheol
- MR: Pyŏngch'ŏl

Byeong-cheol, or Byung-chul, Pyong-chol is a Korean given name. It was the eighth-most popular name for baby boys born in South Korea in 1950.

People with this name include:

- Kim Byong-cheol, South Korean taekwondo practitioner
- Ri Pyong-chol (born 1948), North Korean marshal
- Choi Byung-chul (born 1981), South Korean foil fencer
- Byung-Chul Han (born 1959), South Korean philosopher and cultural theorist
- Byung Chul Kim (born 1974), South Korean artist
- Kim Byung-chul (actor) (born 1974), South Korean actor
- Lee Byung-chul (1910–1987), South Korean businessman
- Park Byung-chul (born 1954), South Korean former football player

== See also ==
- List of Korean given names
