= Yang Soobin =

South Korean entertainer (born 1993)

- Born: Seoul, South Korea
- Agent: Star E&M

Korean name
- Hangul: 양수빈
- RR: Yang Subin
- MR: Yang Subin

Yang Soobin (Korean: 양수빈; born November 19, 1993) is a South Korean entertainer known for her mukbang eating shows. She is under contract with CJ E&M.

== Career ==
Yang rose to social media fame through hosting social eating shows in which she consumes the cuisines of various cultures.

Yang has gained a fan following in Southeast Asian countries especially. She has had several high-turnout fan meetings in Thailand in collaboration with KFC.

== Filmography ==
Year	Broadcaster	Title	Role	Source
2015	Naver TV	The Flatterer	Misook	
2016	MBC Dramanet	Beauty Plus	Panel	
