= Lee Jung-ja =

South Korean volleyball player (born 1951)

Personal information
- Born: March 28, 1951 (age 75); South Korea

Korean name
- Hangul: 이정자
- RR: I Jeongja
- MR: I Chŏngja

Lee Jung-ja (Korean: 이정자; born 28 March 1951) is a South Korean former volleyball player who competed in the 1972 Summer Olympics.
