= Yong-gil =

- Hangul: 영길
- RR: Yeonggil
- MR: Yŏnggil

Yong-gil (Korean: 영길), also spelled Yeong-gil, Yong-gill, Yŏnggil, Young-ghil, Young-gil, Young-kil, or Yung-kil, is a Korean given name. Notable people with the name include:

- An Young-gil (born 1980), South Korean go player
- Choi Young-kil (born 1942), South Korean wrestler
- Kim Yeong-gil (born 1965), South Korean long distance runner
- Kim Young-gil (born 1939), founder of Handong Global University
- Kim Yung-kil (born 1944), North Korean footballer
- Kwon Young-ghil (born 1941), South Korean politician, journalist, and trade unionist
- Ri Yong-gil (born 1952), North Korean military officer
- Song Young-gil (born 1963), South Korean politician
- Yu Yŏnggil (1538–1601), Joseon dynasty scholar-official

== See also ==
- Lee Yong-gill (이용길), South Korean politician
