= Joo-won =

- Hangul: 주원
- RR: Juwon
- MR: Chuwŏn
- IPA: [tɕuwʌn]

Joo-won is a Korean given name. It was the second-most popular name for newborn boys in South Korea in 2011, and came in fifth place in 2015.

People with this name include:

- Kim Chuwŏn (fl. 780), Silla male nobleman
- Chun Joo-weon (born 1972), South Korean female basketball player
- Kim Joo-won (born 1977), South Korean prima ballerina
- Go Joo-won (born 1981), South Korean male actor
- Moon Joo-won (born 1983), South Korean male football player

== See also ==
- List of Korean given names
