= Ji-hu =

- Hangul: 지후
- RR: Jihu
- MR: Chihu

Ji-hu, also spelled Ji-hoo, is a Korean given name. Ji-hu was the second-most common name for newborn boys in South Korea in 2009, with 2,159 being given the name; by 2015, it had fallen to ninth place, with 1,968 being given the name.

People with this name include:

- Park Ji-hu (born 2003), South Korean actress
- Moon Ji-hoo (born 1991), South Korean actor and model
- Yeon Woo-jin (born 1984), South Korean actor, former stage name Seo Ji-hoo
- Han Ji-hoo, South Korean singer, former member of Supernova

Fictional characters with this name include:

- Yoon Ji-hoo, in 2009 South Korean television series Boys Over Flowers (based on Hanazawa Rui)
- Jeon Ji-hoo, in 2013 South Korean television series Incarnation of Money

== See also ==
- List of Korean given names
