= Yi Kyoung-ja =

South Korean author (born 1948)

Yi Kyoung-Ja
- Born: January 28, 1948 (age 78)
- Writing career
- Language: Korean

Korean name
- Hangul: 이경자
- RR: I Gyeongja
- MR: I Kyŏngja

Yi Kyoung-ja (Korean: 이경자; born January 28, 1948) is a South Korean author whose work focuses on the position of women in Korean society.

== Life ==
Yi Kyoung-ja was born on January 28, 1948, in Yangyang, Gangwan-do, Korea. Yangyang is famous for its beautiful scenery and this gave Yi a strong attachment to nature from an early age. She graduated from Sorabol College of the Arts (Today Chung-Ang University) and began submitting her writing to annual spring literary contests at age 19, but not winning until 1973 when she won the Seoul Daily annual spring literary contest.

Lee's writing was intimately connected to her personal life and when she married a banker many people, including the author herself, worried if this would adversely affect her ability to write. Her marriage was a bit of a surprise as she had always planned to not get married and instead concentrate on writing. In the end, however, marriage and children did not affect Yi's ability to write and her strong dedication to writing helped to bring many contradictions in the state of Korean women to light.

== Work ==
One of the salient features of Lee's works is the flowing style of her sentences, which makes her writing fast-paced and readable whether it's a short story or full-length novel. It is within internal character dialogue, however, where her lively prose really shines. Lee often uses such dialogue as a means of revealing characters' conflicts and anguish. In these internal conversations, she uses authentic and colloquial language without excessive embellishment. Her novels feel genuine to readers due to the reality effect created by her natural use of everyday language. Even during the 1980s, when ideological discourse dominated literature, author Lee Kyung-ja's prose offered a sentimental view of women's experiences. It is misguided, however, to focus on the mere fact that she is a female author writing about women.

It isn't easy to sum up her universe of published works including short story collections and full-length novels. Nevertheless, there are some keywords that can provide insight into her works. One of the most important themes Lee is interested in is the caged life of women, similar to that depicted by Guy de Maupassant in Une Vie. In her works concerned with female transformation, two major types can be identified.

One of her novels begins by introducing a married female protagonist who is fretting over the institution of marriage and her husband's indifference. The heroine ultimately ends her marriage after meeting another man, her true love. In Lee's works, most women domesticated under the institution of marriage but later reborn as 'warriors of love,' are originally middle-class housewives enjoying comfortable lives. Lee's full-length novel, [Waking up Alone in the Morning] (1993), is a work of this type.

Lee has also used the biographical format in her novels. In one of Lee's works, the reader is introduced to a heroine who had once been full of hope as a little girl, before being cast into tragedy and suffering after marriage, a transformation that Lee describes in minute detail. In the oral tradition that existed before the modern literary era, women verbally recounted their life stories. In the same fashion, narrators in Lee Kyung-ja's works tell us tales from long lives centered on marriage, birth, unfaithful husbands, family feuds, and other critical events. Lee's acclaimed and prize-winning works such as [Love and Hurt] (1998) and [Affection Never Withers] (1999) are good examples of the kind of work described above. Such stories present personal life history in a form that sheds light on modern Korean history magically interwoven with the individual.

Yi has won several awards including the 4th annual Han Mu-sook Literature prize in 1999, the 4th Goh-Jung-hee Literature Prize 2011, and in 2004 the Beautiful Writer's Prize which is awarded to older writers by younger ones.

== Works in translation ==
- Une Fille nommée Deuxième garçon (여성 단편선 <둘남이>)

== Works in Korean (partial) ==
Story collections

- Incident at Halmiso
- Survival
- Hunchback's Love

Serial novels

- Half a Failure

Full-length novels

- Castle of Betrayal
- Waking Up Alone in the Morning
- Rapturous Rebellion
- Love and Hurt
- Affection Never Withers
- Who'll Untie the Knot?
- Cassia Flower

== Awards ==
- 4th annual Han Mu-sook Literature prize in 1999
- Beautiful Writer's Prize 2004
- 4th Goh-Jung-hee Literature Prize 2011
