= Min-ji =

- Hangul: 민지
- RR: Minji
- MR: Minji

Min-ji, also spelled Min-jee, is a Korean given name. Min-ji was the fourth-most popular name for baby girls born in South Korea in 1990.

== Notable people ==
People with this name include:

=== Entertainers ===
- Minzy (born Gong Min-ji, 1994), South Korean singer, member of girl group 2NE1
- Kim Min-ji (actress) (born 1992), South Korean actress
- Minji (singer) (born Kim Min-ji, 2004), South Korean singer, member of girl group NewJeans
- Lee Min-ji (actress, born 1988), South Korean actress
- Lee Min-ji (Miss Korea) (born 1991), South Korean beauty pageant titleholder
- Park Min-ji (born 1989), South Korean actress
- Anda (singer), (born Won Min-ji, 1991), South Korean singer
- Yeon Min-ji (born Lee Min-ji, 1984), South Korean actress

=== Sportspeople ===
- Ji Min-ji (born 1999), South Korean pair skater
- Kim Min-jee (speed skater) (born 1986), South Korean speed skater, gold medallist at the 2003 Asian Winter Games
- Kim Min-ji (sport shooter) (born 1989), South Korean sport shooter
- Kim Min-ji (volleyball) (born 1995), South Korean volleyball player
- Kim Min-ji (curler) (born 1999), South Korean curler
- Minjee Lee (born 1996), Australian golfer of Korean descent
- Oh Min-ji (born 1985), South Korean speed skater
- Shim Min-ji (born 1983), South Korean swimmer
- Um Min-ji (born 1991), South Korean curler
- Yeo Min-ji (born 1993), South Korean football player

== See also ==
- List of Korean given names
