= Jong-soo =

- Hangul: 종수
- RR: Jongsu
- MR: Chongsu

Jong-soo is a Korean given name. According to South Korean government data, it was the second most-popular name for newborn boys in Korea under Japanese rule in 1940.

People with this name include:

- Jong Soo Park (born 1941), South Korean-born Canadian taekwondo master
- Augustinus Kim Jong-soo (born 1956), South Korean Roman Catholic priest
- Chung Jong-soo (born 1961), South Korean former international footballer
- Lee Jong-soo (born 1976), South Korean actor
- Ko Jong-soo (born 1978), South Korean football coach
- Kim Jong-soo (born 1986), South Korean footballer

== See also ==
- List of Korean given names
