= Ji-eun =

- Hangul: 지은
- RR: Jieun
- MR: Chiŭn
- IPA: [tɕiɯn]

Ji-eun, also spelled Jee-eun, Ji-un or Jee-un, is a Korean given name. It was the fourth most popular name for baby girls in South Korea in 1980, rising to second place in 1988, where it remained in 1990.

== People ==
People with this name include:

Entertainers

- Im Ji-eun (born 1973), South Korean actress
- Park Ji-eun (born 1976), South Korean screenwriter
- Kang Ye-won (born Kim Ji-eun, 1980), South Korean actress
- Oh Ji-eun (born 1981), South Korean actress
- Han Ji-eun (born 1987), South Korean actress
- Song Jieun (born 1990), South Korean singer, member of girl group Secret
- IU (entertainer) (born Lee Ji-eun, 1993), South Korean singer and actress
- Kim Ji-eun (born 1993), South Korean actress

Sportspeople

- Lee Ji-eun (footballer) (born 1979), South Korean footballer
- Grace Park (golfer) (born Park Ji-eun, 1979), South Korean professional golfer
- Um Ji-eun (born 1987), South Korean freestyle wrestler
- Choi Ji-eun (born 1988), South Korean figure skater
- Lee Ji-eun (swimmer) (born 1989), South Korean swimmer
- Kang Gee-eun (born 1990), South Korean sport shooter
- Song Ji-eun (handballer) (born 1996), South Korean handballer

== See also ==
- List of Korean given names
