= Eun Seong-soo =

South Korean footballer

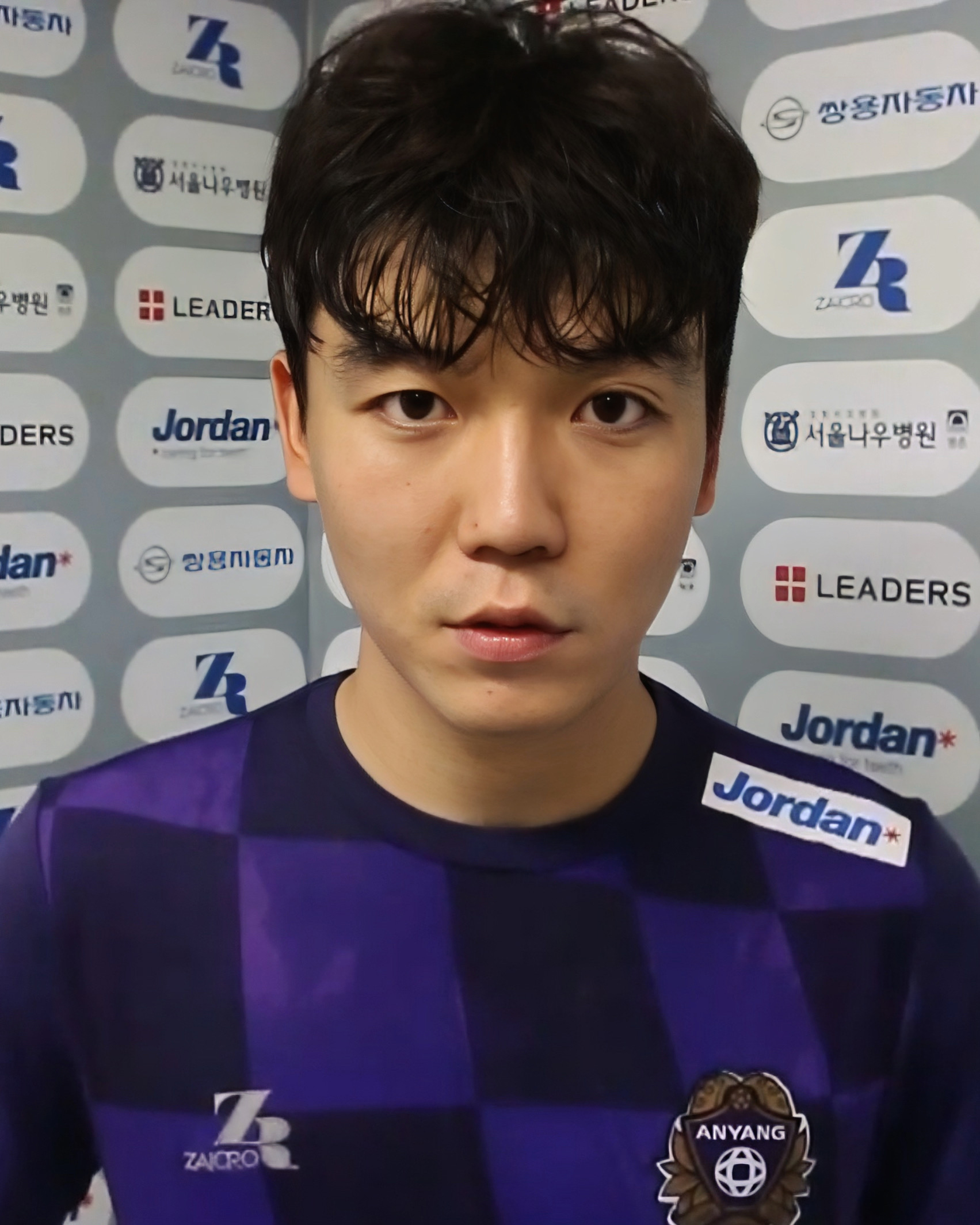
- Eun with FC Anyang in 2018

Personal information
- Full name: Eun Seong-soo
- Date of birth: 22 June 1993 (age 33)
- Place of birth: South Korea
- Height: 1.82 m (6 ft 0 in)
- Position: Midfielder

Team information
- Current team: Dangjin Citizen FC
- Number: 8

Youth career
- –2015: Soongsil University

Senior career*
Years	Team	Apps	(Gls)
2016–2017	Suwon Samsung Bluewings	0	(0)
2018–2019	FC Anyang	14	(1)
2020	Jinju Citizen FC		
2021	FC Namdong		
2022	Goyang KH FC		
2023–	Dangjin Citizen FC		
Korean name
Hangul	은성수
Hanja	殷成洙
RR	Eun Seongsu
MR	Ŭn Sŏngsu
- * Club domestic league appearances and goals as of 12 November 2023

Eun Seong-soo (Korean: 은성수; Hanja: 殷成洙; born 22 June 1993) is a South Korean football midfielder who plays for Dangjin Citizen FC in K League 4.

== Club career ==
Eun joined Suwon Samsung Bluewings in 2016 and made his professional debut against Gamba Osaka in AFC Champions League on 24 February 2016.

== Club career statistics ==
Club performance			League		Cup		continental		Total	
Season	Club	League	Apps	Goals	Apps	Goals	Apps	Goals	Apps	Goals
South Korea			League		KFA Cup		Asia		Total	
2016	Suwon Samsung Bluewings	KL Classic	0	0	0	0	1	0	1	0
Total	South Korea		0	0	0	0	1	0	1	0
Career total			0	0	0	0	1	0	1	0
