= Yeong-gi =

- Hangul: 영기
- RR: Yeonggi
- MR: Yŏnggi

Yeong-gi, also spelled Yeong-ki, Young-gi, Young-ki, Young-kee, or Yong-gi, is a Korean given name. According to South Korean government data, it was the fourth-most popular name for baby boys born in 1940.

People with this name include:

- Choi Yeong-gi (1925–2004), South Korean track and field athlete
- An Yong-gi (born 1929), North Korean spy, one of South Korea's unconverted long-term prisoners
- Kim Yeong-gi (basketball) (born 1936), South Korean basketball player
- Young-Kee Kim (born 1962), South Korean-born American physicist
- Verbal (rapper) (born Ryu Young-gi, 1975), Zainichi Korean rapper, member of hip-hop duo m-flo
- Min Young-ki (born 1976), South Korean football defender (K-League Challenge)
- Kim Yeong-gi (born 1985), Zainichi Korean footballer (J.League)
- Son Young-ki (born 1985), South Korean foil fencer

== See also ==
- List of Korean given names
- Oh Young-ki (오용기; born 1965), South Korean former handball player
- Young Gi Han (한영지; born 1984), South Korean artist
