= Hyun-woo =

- Hangul: 현우
- RR: Hyeonu
- MR: Hyŏnu
- IPA: [çʌnu]

Hyun-woo, also spelled Hyeon-woo, or Hyeon-wu, Hyon-woo, is a Korean given name. It has been a popular name for baby boys in South Korea for more than two decades, coming in third place in 1988 and fourth place in 1998. In 2008, a total of 1,943 baby boys were given this name, making it the third-most popular name that year.

Notable people with this name include:

== Entertainers ==
- Lee Hyun-woo (born 1966), Korean-American singer and actor
- Ha Hyun-woo (born 1981), South Korean singer-songwriter
- Ji Hyun-woo (born Joo Hyung-tae, 1984), South Korean actor and musician
- Hyun Woo (born Kim Hyun-woo, 1985), South Korean actor
- Shownu (born Son Hyun-woo, 1992), South Korean singer and actor, member of boy band Monsta X
- Lee Hyun-woo (born 1993), South Korean actor and singer
- Muzin (born Kim Hyun-Woo, 2001), South Korean singer, member of boy band BAE173

== Sportspeople ==
- Ryu Hyun-woo (golfer) (born 1981), South Korean golfer
- Lim Hyun-woo (born 1983), South Korean football player
- Nam Hyun-woo (field hockey) (born 1987), South Korean field hockey player
- Kim Hyeon-woo (born 1988), South Korean wrestler
- Kim Hyun-woo (footballer, born 1989), South Korean football player
- Joo Hyeon-woo (born 1990), South Korean football player
- Jo Hyeon-woo (born 1991), South Korean football player
- Chae Hyun-woo (born 2004), South Korean football player

== Other ==
- Ryu Hyun-woo (diplomat), North Korean diplomat
- Gong Hyeon-U (born 1959), Chinese diplomat

== Fictional characters ==
- Kim Hyun-woo, in 2016 South Korean animated television series The Haunted House
- Baek Hyun-woo, in 2024 South Korean television series Queen of Tears
- Hyun-woo, a character from the Korean animated webseries Alien Stage
