= Ji-yoon =

- Hangul: 지윤
- RR: Jiyun
- MR: Chiyun

Ji-yoon, also spelled Jee-yoon, Ji-yun, or Ji-youn, is a Korean given name. Ji-yoon was the ninth-most popular name for newborn girls in South Korea in 2011.

People with this name include:

- Kim Ji-yoon (basketball) (born 1976), South Korean basketball player
- Park Ji-yoon (born 1982), South Korean singer
- Hwang Ji-yoon (born 1983), South Korean football player
- Jeon Ji-yoon (born 1990), South Korean singer

== See also ==
- List of Korean given names
