= Soo-ah =

- Hangul: 수아
- RR: Sua
- MR: Sua
- IPA: [sʰua]

Soo-ah, also spelled Su-a, is a Korean given name. It was the eighth-most popular name for newborn girls in South Korea in the first nine months of 2017, with 1,416 out of 137,528 girls born during that period being given the name.

People with this name include:

- Bae Suah (born 1965), South Korean writer
- Su-a Lee (born 1970s), South Korean cellist
- Hong Soo-ah (born 1986), South Korean actress
- Park Soo-ah (born Park Soo-young, 1994), South Korean singer, former member of After School
- Moon Sua (born 1999), South Korean singer, member of girl group Billlie

Fictional characters with this name include:

- Oh Soo-ah, in 2005 South Korean television series Green Rose
- Min Soo-ah, in 2011 South Korean film Blind
- Im Soo-ah, in 2012 South Korean television series Shut Up Flower Boy Band
- Hyun Soo-A, in 2018 South Korean television series Gangnam Beauty
- Oh Soo-ah, in 2020 South Korean television series Itaewon Class
- Choi Soo-ah, in 2020 South Korean television series True Beauty
- Cha Soo-ah, in 2020 South Korean Netflix adaptation Sweet Home (TV series)

== See also ==
- List of Korean given names
