= Lee Gyeong-hui =

South Korean speed skater (born 1958)

Personal information
- Nationality: South Korean
- Born: 9 March 1958 (age 67)

Sport
- Sport: Speed skating

Lee Gyeong-hui (born 9 March 1958) is a South Korean speed skater. She competed in two events at the 1972 Winter Olympics.
