= Hyun-jung =

- Hangul: 현정
- RR: Hyeonjeong
- MR: Hyŏnjŏng
- IPA: [çʌndʑʌŋ]

Hyun-jung, also spelled Hyun-jeong, or Hyeon-jung, Hyeon-jeong, Hyun-jong, Hyon-jong, Hyon-jeong is a Korean given name. It was the second-most popular name for baby girls born in South Korea in 1970, falling to tenth place by 1980.

== People ==
People with this name include:

Entertainers

- Go Hyun-jung (born 1971), South Korean actress
- Big Mama King (born Kim Hyun-jung, 1973), South Korean singer
- Kim Hyun-jung (singer) (born 1976), South Korean singer
- Seola (singer) (born Kim Hyun-jung, 1994), South Korean singer and actress
- Jo Hyeon-jeong (born 1979), South Korean voice actress
- Vivian Cha (born Cha Hyun-jung, 1993), South Korean fashion model
- Eom Hyeon-jeong, South Korean voice actress
- Niki Yang (born Yang Hyun-jeong, 1985), South Korean animator and voice actress

Sportspeople

- Woo Hyun-jung (born 1977), South Korean field hockey player
- Yang Hyun-jung (born 1977), South Korean football coach
- Joo Hyun-jung (born 1982), South Korean archer
- Na Hyun-jung (born 1990), South Korean volleyball player
- Kim Hyeon-jung (figure skater) (born 1992), South Korean figure skater
- Chi Hyun-jung (born 1971), South Korean figure skater

== See also ==
- List of Korean given names
