= Kyung-ok =

- Hangul: 경옥
- RR: Gyeongok
- MR: Kyŏngok

Kyung-ok, also spelled Kyong-ok, is a Korean given name. Kyung-ok was the tenth-most popular name for baby girls born in South Korea in 1950.

People with this name include:

- Kang Kyung-ok (born 1965), South Korean manhwa artist
- Kim Kyung-ok (born 1983), South Korean judoka
- Kim Kyong-ok, North Korean politician, member of the Central Military Commission of the Workers' Party of Korea
- Ri Kyong-ok, North Korean judoka, represented North Korea at the 2004 Summer Olympics

== See also ==
- List of Korean given names
