= Kimshin Myongsuk =

South Korean journalist (born 1961)

- Hangul: 김신명숙
- RR: Gimsin Myeongsuk
- MR: Kimsin Myŏngsuk

Kimshin Myongsuk (김신명숙, born March 5, 1961) is a South Korean feminism activist and human rights activist, journalist and reporter for If News, a liberal feminist Korean news journal.

In her early years Kim worked as a Dong-a Ilbo journalist. In the 1990s she supported feminism movements. She worked for KBS, MBC and other TV broadcasts. In the 2000s she joined If News. Kimshin Myongsuk was appointed as an editor and director there. In 1999, she made controversial appearances on KBS.

She is known for obtaining the first doctoral degree in the field of 'A theory of Feminine God' in South Korea.
