= Eun-jung =

- Hangul: 은정
- RR: Eunjeong
- MR: Ŭnjŏng
- IPA: [ɯndʑʌŋ]

Eun-jung, also spelled Eun-jeong or Eun-jong, Un-jong, is a Korean given name. It was the third-most common name for baby girls in South Korea in 1970, falling to sixth place in 1980.

== People ==
People with this name include:

Entertainers

- Shin Eun-jung (born 1974), South Korean actress
- Han Eun-jung (born 1980), South Korean actress
- Hahm Eun-jung (born 1988), South Korean actress and singer, member of girl group T-ara

Sportspeople

- Chang Eun-jung (born 1970), South Korean field hockey player
- Cho Eun-jung (born 1971), South Korean field hockey player
- Shim Eun-jung (born 1971), South Korean badminton player
- Lee Eun-jung (born 1981), South Korean long-distance runner
- Yi Eun-jung (born 1988), South Korean golfer
- Hong Un-jong (born 1989), North Korean artistic gymnast
- Kim Eun-jung (curler) (born 1990), South Korean curler

== See also ==
- List of Korean given names
- People with the name 은중, which may also be spelled "Eun-jung" in English, but has a different hangul vowel in the second syllable:
  - Kim Eun-jung (writer) (born 1972), South Korean female writer
  - Kim Eun-jung (footballer) (born 1979), South Korean male footballer
