= Ye-jun =

- Hangul: 예준
- RR: Yejun
- MR: Yejun

Ye-jun is a Korean given name. It was the seventh-most popular name for newborn boys in South Korea in 2008, rising to sixth place in 2009 and remaining at sixth place in 2015.

Notable people with the name include:

- Kim Ye-jun (born 2007), South Korean actor

== See also ==
- List of Korean given names
