= Jung-soo =

- Hangul: 정수
- RR: Jeongsu
- MR: Chŏngsu

Jung-soo, also spelled Jeong-soo or Jong-su, is a Korean given name. According to South Korean government data, Jung-soo was the seventh-most popular name for newborn boys in 1945.

== People ==
People with this name include:

Entertainers

- Park Jung-soo (actress), (born 1952), South Korean actress
- Yoon Jung-soo (born 1972), South Korean comedian
- Han Jung-soo (born 1973), South Korean actor
- Byun Jung-soo (born 1974), South Korean actress
- Park Jeong-su (born 1983), stage name Leeteuk, South Korean singer, member of Super Junior

Sportspeople

- Yun Jong-su (born 1962), North Korean football coach
- Jung Jeong-soo (born 1969), South Korean football midfielder (K3 League)
- Shim Jeong-soo (born 1975), South Korean baseball outfielder (Korea Baseball Organization)
- Kim Jong-su (born 1977), North Korean sport shooter
- Lee Jung-soo (born 1980), South Korean football centre-back (K-League Classic)
- Park Jung-soo (footballer) (born 1987), South Korean football midfielder (K-League Challenge)
- Lee Jung-su (born 1989), South Korean speed skater

== See also ==
- List of Korean given names
