= Lee Dong-hyun =

South Korean baseball player

LG Twins – No. 18
- Relief pitcher
- Born: January 12, 1983 (age 43)
- Bats: Right Throws: Right

KBO debut
- April 6, 2001, LG Twins

KBO statistics (through 2018 season)
- Win–loss record: 53–47
- Saves: 41
- Earned run average: 4.09

Teams
- LG Twins (2001–2019)

- Lee Dong-hyun
- Hangul: 이동현
- RR: I Donghyeon
- MR: I Tonghyŏn

Lee Dong-hyun (Korean: 이동현; born January 12, 1983) is a South Korean relief pitcher who plays for the LG Twins in the Korea Baseball Organization.

== Amateur career ==
He was born in Ulsan, and attended Kyunggi High School in Seoul, South Korea.

Upon graduation from the school in 2000, he was selected by the LG Twins with the 1st pick in the 1st round of the 2001 KBO Draft.
