= Young-ho =

- Hangul: 영호
- RR: Yeongho
- MR: Yŏngho
- IPA: [jʌŋβo]

Young-ho, also spelled Yong-ho, is a Korean given name. Young-ho was a highly popular name in the mid-20th century: according to South Korean government data, it was the most common name for newborn boys in 1940, falling to second place by 1950 and third place in 1960.

People with this name include:

== Entertainers ==
- Kim Young-ho (actor) (born 1967), South Korean actor
- Flash (gamer) (born Lee Young-ho, 1992), South Korean professional StarCraft player
- Seo Young-ho (singer) (born John Jun Seo, 1995), Korean-American singer

== Sportspeople ==
- Go Yeong-ho (born 1966), South Korean freestyle wrestler
- Kim Young-ho (fencer) (born 1971), South Korean foil fencer
- Jung Young-ho (born 1982), South Korean freestyle wrestler
- Kwon Young-ho (born 1992), South Korean football defender (K2 League)

== Other ==
- Ri Yong-ho (general) (born 1942), North Korean military officer
- Thae Yong-ho (born 1962), North Korean diplomat who defected to South Korea in 2016
- Yoo Young-ho (born 1965), South Korean sculptor
- Heo Young-ho (born 1986), South Korean professional Go player
- "Young ho", an online term that garnered popularity across social media platforms in 2026

== See also ==
- List of Korean given names
