= Jung-sook =

- Hangul: 정숙
- RR: Jeongsuk
- MR: Chŏngsuk

Jung-sook, also spelled Jeong-sook or Jong-suk, is a Korean given name. According to South Korean government data, Jung-sook was the fourth-most popular name for newborn girls in 1940, rising to second place by 1950.

People with this name include:

- Ho Jong-suk (1908–1991), Korean independence activist, later a North Korean politician
- Kim Jong-suk (1917 or 1919–1949), Korean anti-Japanese guerrilla, first wife of North Korean leader Kim Il-sung
- Oh Jeong-suk (1935–2008), South Korean pansori musician
- Kim Jung-sook (born 1954), South Korean classical vocalist, wife of South Korean president Moon Jae-in
- Yun Jeong-suk (born 1966), South Korean fencer
- Lee Jeong-sook (born 1971), South Korean fencer
- Lim Jeong-sook (born 1972), South Korean field hockey player
- Jung Jung-suk (1982–2011), South Korean football player

Fictional characters with this name include:

- Yoon Jung-sook, in 2004 South Korean television series Sweet 18

== See also ==
- List of Korean given names
