= Min-jae =

- Hangul: 민재
- RR: Minjae
- MR: Minjae

Min-jae is a Korean given name. Min-jae was the ninth-most-popular name for newborn boys in South Korea in 2009.

People with this name include:

== Entertainers ==
- Kim Min-jae (actor, born 1979), South Korean actor
- Kim Min-jae (actor, born 1996), South Korean actor

== Sportspeople ==
- Kim Min-jae (baseball) (born 1973), South Korean third base coach and former shortstop (Korea Baseball Organization)
- Jeon Min-jae (born 1977), South Korean Paralympic athlete
- Kim Min-jae (weightlifter) (born 1983), South Korean weightlifter
- Kang Min-jae (born 1985), South Korean racing driver
- Kim Min-jae (footballer) (born 1996), South Korean footballer
- Min-jae Kwak (born 2000), South Korean footballer

== Fictional characters ==
- Kang Min-jae, in 2004 South Korean television series My 19 Year Old Sister-in-Law

== See also ==
- List of Korean given names
