= Kyung-sook =

- Hangul: 경숙
- RR: Gyeongsuk
- MR: Kyŏngsuk

Kyung-sook, also spelled Gyeong-suk, Kyung-suk or Kyong-suk, is a Korean given name. Kyung-sook was the seventh-most popular name for baby girls in South Korea in 1950, rising to fifth place by 1960.

People with this name include:

- Pak Kyong-suk (1921–2020), North Korean politician
- Jeong Gyeong-suk (born c. 1945), South Korean flight attendant, one of the unreturned victims of the 1969 Korean Air Lines YS-11 hijacking
- Mun Gyeong-suk (born 1945), South Korean volleyball player
- Shin Kyung-sook (born 1963), South Korean writer
- Kim Gyeong-suk (born 1967), South Korean cyclist
- Ri Kyong Suk (North Korean singer) (born 1970), North Korean singer
- Won Gyeong-suk (born 1975), South Korean sport shooter
- Jin Gyeong-suk (1980–2005), North Korean defector
- Hong Kyung-suk (born 1984), South Korean football player
- Park Kyung-suk (taekwondo), South Korean taekwondo athlete

== See also ==
- List of Korean given names
