= Young-sik =

- Hangul: 영식
- RR: Yeongsik
- MR: Yŏngsik

Young-sik, also spelled Young-shik or Yong-sik, is a Korean given name. According to South Korean government data, Young-sik was the sixth-most popular name for baby boys in 1940, falling to seventh place in 1950.

People with this name include:

- Young Shik Rhee (1894–1981), South Korean pastor, founder of Daegu University
- Jang Young-sik (born 1935), South Korean economist
- Kim Young-sik (born 1953), South Korean Kim Jong-il impersonator
- Kim Yong-sik (wrestler) (born 1967), North Korean wrestler
- Lee Young-Sik (born 1973), South Korean sport shooter
- Jung Young-Sik (born 1992), South Korean table tennis player
- Pak Yong-sik, North Korean politician
- Johan Pahk Yeong-sik, South Korean academic, President of the Catholic University of Korea
