= Min-soo =

- Hangul: 민수
- RR: Minsu
- MR: Minsu

Min-soo, also spelled Min-su, is a Korean given name. It was the fifth-most popular name for baby boys in South Korea in 1990.

People with this name include:

Entertainers

- Choi Min-soo (born 1962), South Korean male actor
- Jo Min-su (born 1965), South Korean actress
- Yoon Min-soo (born 1980), South Korean male singer and television personality

Sportspeople

- Han Min-su (born 1970), South Korean male sledge hockey player
- Park Min-su (born 1970), South Korean male cyclist
- Kim Min-soo (judoka) (born 1975), South Korean male judoka
- Kim Min-soo (footballer) (born 1984), South Korean male football player
- Kang Min-soo (born 1986), South Korean male football player
- Jeong Min-su (born 1991), South Korean male volleyball player
- Lee Min-soo (born 1992), South Korean male football player
- Park Min-soo (born 1994), South Korean male gymnast

Others

- Jimmy Cha (born Cha Min-su, 1951), South Korean male professional go player
- Minsoo Kang (born 1967), South Korean-born American male history professor
- Don Spike (born Kim Min-soo, 1977), South Korean male composer
- Bang Min-su (born 1991), South Korean male
