= Sun-young =

- Hangul: 선영
- RR: Seonyeong
- MR: Sŏnyŏng

Sun-young, also spelled Seon-young or Seon-yeong, is a Korean given name. It was the ninth-most popular name for baby girls born in South Korea in 1970, and held the same rank in 1980.

== People ==
People with this name include:

=== Entertainers ===
- Kim Sun-young (actress, born 1976), South Korean actress
- Park Sun-young (actress) (born 1976), South Korean actress
- Kim Sun-young (actress, born 1980), South Korean actress
- Hyomin (born Park Sun-young, 1989), South Korean female singer, member of T-ara
- Luna (South Korean singer) (born Park Sun-young, 1993), South Korean female singer, member of f(x)
- Bak Seon-yeong (voice actress), South Korean voice actress

=== Sportspeople ===
- Kim Seon-young (judoka) (born 1979), South Korean female judo practitioner
- Lee Sun-young (announcer) (born 1982), South Korean female sports announcer
- Lee Sun-young (born 1984), South Korean female long-distance runner
- Yoo Sun-young (born 1986), South Korean female professional golfer on the LPGA tour
- Lim Sun-young (born 1988), South Korean male footballer
- Noh Seon-yeong (born 1989), South Korean female speed skater

=== Other ===
- Lee Sun-young (born 1970), hostage in the 2007 South Korean hostage crisis in Afghanistan
- Sun Yung Shin (born 1974), South Korean-born American female writer

== See also ==
- List of Korean given names
