= Young-sook =

- Hangul: 영숙
- RR: Yeongsuk
- MR: Yŏngsuk

Young-sook, also spelled Yong-suk, is a Korean given name. Names starting with "Young" were popular for South Korean babies of both sexes born in the 1940s and 1950s, and Young-sook was the most common of these for baby girls. In 2012, there were more than forty thousand South Koreans with the name Kim Young-sook, making it the most common full name in the country.

People with this name include:

Artists and writers

- Han Young-suk (1920–1990), South Korean traditional dancer
- Kang Young-sook (born 1967), South Korean writer

Sportspeople

- Kim Young-sook (born 1965), South Korean field hockey player
- Yun Young-sook (born 1971), South Korean archer
- Huh Young-sook (born 1975), South Korean handball player
- Kim Yong-suk (born 1979), North Korean figure skater
- Jo Yong-suk (born 1988), North Korean sport shooter
- Park Young-sook (born 1988), South Korean table tennis player

Others

- Kim Young-sook (born 1947), first wife of North Korean leader Kim Jong-il
- Kim Young-sook, stage name Maya (singer) (born 1979), South Korean singer
