= Ji-yeon =

- Hangul: 지연
- RR: Jiyeon
- MR: Chiyŏn
- IPA: [tɕijʌn]

Ji-yeon (Korean: 지연), also spelled Ji-yun, Ji-yon, Ji-yean, Jee-yeon, Jee-yon, Chee-yun, Chi-yun, Chi-yon is a Korean given name. It was the seventh-most popular name for baby girls born in South Korea in 1980.

People with this name include:

== Entertainers ==
- Myung Ji-yun (born 1975), South Korean actress
- Gummy (singer) (born Park Ji-yeon, 1981), South Korean singer
- Lina (South Korean singer) (born Lee Ji-yeon, 1984), South Korean musical actress and singer, member of girl group The Grace
- Park Ji-yeon (actress, born 1988), South Korean musical theatre actress
- Lim Ji-yeon (born 1990), South Korean actress
- Park Ji-yeon (born 1993), South Korean singer and actress, member of girl group T-ara
- Kei (singer) (born Kim Ji-yeon, 1995), South Korean singer, member of girl group Lovelyz and El7z Up
- Bona (singer) (born Kim Ji-yeon, 1995), South Korean singer, member of girl group Cosmic Girls

== Sportspeople ==
- Hong Ji-yeon (born 1970), South Korean volleyball player
- Nam Jie-youn (born 1983), South Korean volleyball player
- Kim Ji-yeon (fencer) (born 1988), South Korean sabre fencer
- Ji Yeon Kim (fighter) (born 1988), South Korean mixed martial artist
- Seo Ji-yeon (born 1993), South Korean sabre fencer
- Choi Ji-yeon (born 1998), South Korean ice hockey player

== Others ==
- Melissa Lee (born Lee Jiyun, 1966), South Korean-born New Zealand politician
- Kim Chee-yun (born 1970), South Korean violinist
- Jeanne You (born You Ji-yeoun, 1978), South Korean classical pianist
- Ji-Yeon Yuh, American reporter, writer, editor and professor

== Fictional characters ==
- Kwon Ji Yeon, in American television series Lost, for whom the episode Ji Yeon (Lost) is named
- Jee-Yun Buckley Han, in American television series 9-1-1

== See also ==
- List of Korean given names
