= Yoshiko =

Yoshiko is a feminine Japanese given name.

== Written forms ==
The name Yoshiko can have a variety of different meanings depending on which kanji characters are used to write it. Over 200 possible variations of the name exist. Some of the most common variations of Yoshiko include:

- 良子; good, child
- 佳子; agreeable, child
- 美子; beautiful, child
- 義子; moral and just, child
- 吉子; fortunate, child
- 悦子; joyful, child
- 祥子; auspicious, child
- 芳子; fragrant, child
- 慶子; jubilant, child
- 好子; fond and pleasing, child

== Japanese royalty ==
- Yoshiko, daughter of Emperor Saga (786–842)
- Fujiwara no Yoshiko (died 807), consort of Emperor Kanmu
- Yoshiko (1122–1133), daughter of Emperor Toba
- Princess Yoshiko (Go-Mizunoo), daughter of Emperor Go-Mizunoo (1633 - 1696)
- Yoshiko, daughter of Emperor Reigen (1654–1732)
- Princess Yoshiko (Kōkaku) (1779–1846), empress consort of Emperor Kōkaku
- Princess Yoshiko (Arisugawa-no-miya) – Japanese princess (1804–1893)
- Yoshiko Kawashima – Qing dynasty royal and Japanese spy (1907–1948)

== Others ==
- Princess Kishi (929–985), also known as Yoshiko Joō, Japanese poet
- Yoshiko Akiyama (秋山 芳子; born 1949), Japanese archer
- Yoshiko Fujinaga (藤永 佳子; born 1981), Japanese long-distance runner
- Yoshiko Ichikawa (市川 良子; born 1976), Japanese long-distance runner
- Yoshiko Inoue (井上 佳子; born 1988), Japanese sport wrestler
- Yoshiko Ito (伊藤 佳子; born 1962), Japanese sport shooter
- Yoshiko Iwamoto Wada (born 1944) American textile artist, author
- Yoshiko Kakudo (1934–2016), Japanese-American curator, philanthropist
- Yoshiko Kuga (久我 美子; born 1931), Japanese actress
- Yoshiko Mibuchi (三淵 嘉子; 1914–1984), Japanese lawyer
- Yoshiko Mita (三田 佳子; born 1941), Japanese actress
- Yoshiko Miya (宮淑子; 1945–2015), Japanese writer and social critic
- Yoshiko Morizane (森実 芳子; born 1948), Japanese swimmer
- Yoshiko Nishitani (西谷 祥子; born 1943), Japanese manga artist
- Yoshiko Ohtani (1918–2000), Japanese religious leader
- Yoshiko Sakakibara (榊原 良子; born 1956), Japanese voice actress
- Yoshiko Sakurai (櫻井 よしこ; born 1945), Japanese journalist
- Yoshiko Shibaki (芝木 好子; 1914–1991), Japanese novelist
- Yoshiko Shigekane (重兼 芳子; 1927–1993), Japanese writer
- Yoshiko Shiotani (潮谷 義子; born 1939), Japanese politician
- Yoshiko Shirata (白田 佳子; born 1952), Japanese accounting scholar
- Yoshiko Takamatsu (高松 好子; born 1938), Japanese swimmer
- Yoshiko Takano (鷹野 淑子; born 1942), Japanese speed skater
- Yoshiko Tamura (田村 欣子; born 1976), Japanese professional wrestler
- Yoshiko Tanaka (田中 好子; 1956–2011), Japanese actress
- Yoshiko Tanaka (table tennis) (田中 良子), Japanese table tennis player
- Yoshiko Watanabe (渡辺 佳子; born 1973), Japanese manga artist, illustrator and animator
- Yoshiko Yamaguchi (山口 淑子; 1920–2014), Japanese singer, actress and politician
- Yoshiko Yonekura (米倉 よし子; born 1958), Japanese badminton player

== Fictional characters ==
- Yoshiko Fujisawa, a fictional character from Captain Tsubasa
- Yoshiko Hanabatake, a fictional character from the Japanese manga series Aho Girl
- Yoshiko Koizumi, a fictional character from manga Little Ghost Q-Taro
- Yoshiko Kunieda, a fictional character from The Brave Fighter of Sun Fighbird
- Yoshiko Nishizawa, a fictional character from the anime/manga series Strike Witches
- Yoshiko Nonomiya, a fictional character from Natsume Soseki’s novel Sanshirō
- Yoshiko Tsushima, a fictional character from the Japanese multimedia project Love Live! Sunshine!!
- Yoshiko, a fictional character from Osamu Dazai's novel No Longer Human.
- Yoshiko Tajimi, a fictional character from the Japanese tokusatsu Kamen Rider Build

== See also ==
- "Yoshiko (song)", a 1964 American pop song performed by The J's with Jamie
- Yoshiko (wrestler) (born 1993), Japanese professional wrestler
