= Hye-jin =

- Hangul: 혜진
- RR: Hyejin
- MR: Hyejin
- IPA: [çed͡ʑin]

Hye-jin is a Korean given name. It was the second-most popular name for baby girls born in South Korea in 1980, falling to fifth by 1990.

== People ==
People with this name include:

=== Entertainers ===
- Jang Hye-jin (singer) (born 1965), South Korean singer
- Shim Hye-jin (born Shim Sang-gun, 1967), South Korean actress
- Jang Hye-jin (actress) (born 1975), South Korean actress
- Kim Hye-jin (actress) (born 1975), South Korean actress
- Jeon Hye-jin (actress, born 1976), South Korean actress
- Han Hye-jin (actress) (born 1981), South Korean actress
- Han Hye-jin (model) (born 1983), South Korean model
- Jeon Hye-jin (actress, born 1988), South Korean actress
- Hwasa (born Ahn Hye-jin, 1995), South Korean singer, member of girl group Mamamoo

=== Sportspeople ===
- Cho Hey-jin (born 1973), South Korean basketball player
- Lee Hye-jin (sport shooter) (born 1985), South Korean sport shooter
- Chang Hye-jin (born 1987), South Korean archer
- Choi Hye-jin (born 1991), South Korean golfer
- Lee Hye-jin (born 1991), South Korean track cyclist
- Kim Hye-jin (swimmer) (born 1994), South Korean swimmer
- Cho Hye-jin (field hockey) (born 1995), South Korean field hockey player

== See also ==
- List of Korean given names
