= Choi Eun-young =

South Korean novelist

Choi Eun-young (born March 3, 1984) is a South Korean writer. She began her literary career in 2013, when her short story “Shokoui miso” (쇼코의 미소; Shoko's Smile) was selected for the quarterly literary magazine Writer's World's New Writer's Award. With the same work, she received the 5th Munhakdongne Young Writer's Award in 2014. She was awarded the 8th Heo Gyun Writer's Award in 2016, and was awarded the 8th Munhakdongne Young Writer's award in 2017.

== Life ==
Choi Eun-young was born on March 3, 1984, in Gwangmyeong, Gyeonggido. Her writing was influenced much by her relationship with her father, who was a teacher. Her father, who was a member of the Korean Teachers and Educations Workers Union, had a very critical view of social issues, but was conservative when it came to his views on gender and other related issues. Choi Eun-young fundamentally agreed with her father's views, but grew up resisting his views on gender.

In 2002, she entered Korea University and studied Korean Literature. She attended university during a time when there were still lingering effects from Korea's 1997 financial crisis. During her undergraduate studies she always maintained a critical stance on various social issues, such as issues regarding temporary positions. This was also a time when Korea's liberal political faction was in power. At the time in Korea, Kim Dae-jung and Roh Moo-hyun consecutive served as presidents. Afterwards, as she lived through the years of Lee Myung-bak and Park Geun-hye, Choi Eun-young came to think that the past was a much happier time. When she was a university student, she was always interested in social issues, and she also participated in making a feminist school magazine.

Having debuted in 2013, Choi Eun-young's first short story collection Shokoui miso (쇼코의 미소; Shoko's Smile) was published in August 2016. This book has been sold widely, having been printed 12 times until March 2017. It was also selected as “2016’s Best Fiction Selected by 50 Writers”.

== Writing ==
In the 2014 spring issue of the quarterly Munhakdongne, in the Reviews & Discussions corner, which was the first critical response to her debut work “Shokoui miso” (쇼코의 미소; Shoko's Smile), there is a section on “Shokoui miso” (쇼코의 미소; Shoko's Smile) with a subtitle of ‘A Barefaced Story of Growth’. Also, a review of her collection Shokoui miso (쇼코의 미소; Shoko's Smile), which is a collection of all the short stories she had published in the 3 years since her debut, has evaluated that Choi Eun-young's works have a ‘narrative strength that is pure and clean’.

Choi Eun-young's works often gain popularity from her writing style, which does not show much literary finesse “Bimil” (비밀; The Secret) is one of her works that showcases her style. “Bimil” (비밀; The Secret) is a story about the death of an absent protagonist Jimin who is a temporary teacher. The story does not tell of Jimin's death, but as the story comes to its conclusion, readers become aware of this secret. And at that moment they also become aware that this is a work dedicated to the two temporary teachers that have died in the 2014 Sewol Ferry disaster. It is a story that is communicating the subject not by telling it, but via forming a sophisticated structure around it.

Another characteristic of Choi Eun-young's writing is her interest in political and social issues. Other than “Bimil” (비밀; The Secret), “Michaela” (미카엘라) also deals with the issue of the Sewol Ferry disaster. “Eonni naui jakeun sunae eonni” (언니 나의 작은 순애 언니; Big Sister, My Small Big Sister Sunae) talks about the Inhyukdang incident, and “Ssinjjao ssinjjao” (씬짜오 씬짜오) talks about issues regarding South Korea’s participation in the Vietnam War. “Hanjiwa yeongju” (한지와 영주; Hanji and Yeongju), and “Meongoteseo on norae” (먼 곳에서 온 노래; A Song From Far Away) are works that show the author's interests in feminism.

== Works ==
- Shokoui miso (쇼코의 미소; Shoko's Smile), 2016.

== Awards ==
- Munhakdongne Young Writer's award, 2017.
- Heo Gyun Writer's Award, 2016.
- Munhakdongne Young Writer's Award, 2014.
