= Min-seo =

- Hangul: 민서
- RR: Minseo
- MR: Minsŏ

Min-seo is a Korean given name.

In 2008 it was the 2nd-most popular given name for baby girls in South Korea, with 2,881 being given the name.

People with this name include:

- Kim Minseo (born 2002), South Korean musical artist in group Drippin
- Kang Min-seo (born 2001), South Korean singer in group Fantasy Boys
- Chae Min-seo (born Jo Soo-jin, 1981), South Korean actress
- Kim Min-seo (born 1984), South Korean actress
- Kim Min-seo (badminton) (born 1987), South Korean badminton player
- Minseo (singer, born 1996) (born Kim Min-seo, 1996), South Korean singer and actress, member of band 90 project
- Jeon Min-seo (born 2003), South Korean actress
- Kim Min-seo (singer, born 2004), South Korean singer, dancer, and member of Wooah

== See also ==
- List of Korean given names
