= Kim Ji-yeong (voice actress) =

South Korean voice actress (born 1976)

- Born: October 26, 1976 (age 49)
- Occupation: Voice actress
- Employer: Munhwa Broadcasting Corporation

Korean name
- Hangul: 김지영
- RR: Gim Jiyeong
- MR: Kim Chiyŏng

Kim Ji-yeong (Korean: 김지영; born October 26, 1976) is a South Korean voice actress who joined the Munhwa Broadcasting Corporation's Voice Acting Division in 1999.

== Roles ==
=== Broadcast TV ===
- E-Mark (narration, MBC)
- Magical DoReMi (Korea TV Edition, MBC)
- Digimon Frontier (Korea TV Edition, Tooniverse)
- Atlantis King (MBC)
- Fairy Adventure (MBC)

=== Film dubbing ===
- Creyon Shin Chan (Movie, Korea TV Edition, MBC)
- I Still Know What You Did Last Summer (replacing Karla Wilson, Korea TV Edition, MBC)
- Bring It On (replacing Gabrielle Union, Korea TV Edition, MBC)
- Star Wars: Episode I – The Phantom Menace, (replacing Natalie Portman, Korea TV Edition, MBC)
- True Lies (replacing Eliza Dushku, Korea TV Edition, MBC)

== See also ==
- Munhwa Broadcasting Corporation
- MBC Voice Acting Division
