= Ha-eun =

- Hangul: 하은
- RR: Haeun
- MR: Haŭn
- IPA: [haɯn]

Ha-eun, also spelled Ha-un, is a Korean given name. It was the eighth-most popular name for newborn girls in South Korea in 2011.

People with this name include:

- Kim Ha-eun (born 1984), South Korean actress
- Haeun (born Kim Ha-eun, 1994), South Korean singer, member of the R&B group 4Men
- Yang Ha-eun (born 1994), South Korean table tennis player
- Na Haeun (born 2009), South Korean singer and member of girl group Unchild

Fictional characters:

- Jung Ha-eun, a character in South Korean film Soulmate (2023 film)

== See also ==
- List of Korean given names
