= Ji-hoon =

- Hangul: 지훈
- RR: Jihun
- MR: Chihun

Ji-hoon, also spelled Ji-hun, is a Korean given name. Ji-hun has been a popular name for South Korean baby boys for several decades, coming in fourth place in 1970, first place in 1980, and first place again in 1990. In 2008 it was the second-most popular name for baby boys, with 2,158 given the name.

People with this name include:

== Entertainers ==
- Kim Ji-hoon (singer) (1973–2013), South Korean singer
- Lee Ji-hoon (entertainer) (born 1979), South Korean singer and actor
- Kim Ji-hoon (actor, born 1981), South Korean actor
- Ju Ji-hoon (born 1982), South Korean actor
- Rain (entertainer) (born Jung Ji-hoon, 1982), South Korean singer and actor
- Lee Ji-hoon (actor, born 1988), South Korean actor
- Roh Ji-hoon (born 1990), South Korean singer
- P.O (born Pyo Ji-hoon, 1993), South Korean singer and actor, member of boy band Block B
- Woozi (born Lee Ji-hoon, 1996), South Korean singer, member of boy band Seventeen
- Seo Ji-hoon (actor) (born 1997), South Korean actor
- Shin Ji-hoon (born 1998), South Korean singer and figure skater
- Park Ji-hoon (born 1999), South Korean singer and actor
- Kim Ji-hoon (actor, born 2000), South Korean actor and singer, member of boy band TRCNG

== Sportspeople ==
- Chae Ji-hoon (born 1974), South Korean short track speed skater
- Ham Ji-hoon (born 1984), South Korean basketball player
- Kim Ji-hoon (gymnast) (born 1984), South Korean gymnast
- Baek Ji-hoon (born 1985), South Korean football player
- Kim Ji-hoon (sailor) (born 1985), South Korean sailor
- Kim Ji-hoon (boxer) (born 1987), South Korean boxer
- Hong Ji-hoon (born 1988), South Korean badminton player
- Yoo Ji-hoon (born 1988), South Korean football player
- Lee Ji-hoon (sledge hockey) (born 1989), South Korean ice sledge hockey player
- Cho Ji-hun (born 1990), South Korean football player
- Kim Ji-hun (wrestler) (born 1992), South Korean Greco-Roman wrestler
- Kang Ji-hoon (born 1997), South Korean football player
- To Ji-hun (born 2003), South Korean figure skater

== Other ==
- Jo Jihun (1920–1968), Korean poet and activist
- Kim Ji-hoon (director) (born 1971), South Korean director
- Rim Ji-hoon (born 1980), South Korean businessman
- Seo Ji-hun (born 1985), South Korean professional StarCraft player

== See also ==
- List of Korean given names
