= Jeong-ja =

- Hangul: 정자
- RR: Jeongja
- MR: Chŏngja

Jeong-ja, also spelled Jung-ja, Jong-ja, or Chung-ja, is a Korean given name.

Typically, "ja" is written with the hanja meaning "child" (子). In Japan, where this character is read ko, it was originally used as suffix for the names of girls in the aristocracy. The practice of adding -ko to girls' names spread to the lower classes following the 1868 Meiji Restoration. Jeong-ja is one of a number of Japanese-style names ending in "ja", along with Young-ja and Soon-ja, that were popular when Korea was under Japanese rule from 1910 to 1945, but declined in popularity afterwards. According to South Korean government data, it was the sixth-most popular name for baby girls in 1940. By 1950 there were no names ending in "ja" in the top ten.

== People ==
People with this name include:

- Ho Jong-suk (born Ho Jong-ja; 1908–1991), Korean independence activist and North Korean politician
- Lee Jung-ja (born 1951), South Korean former volleyball player
- Sin Jung-ja (born 1980), South Korean basketball player

== See also ==
- List of Korean given names
