= Joon-ho =

- Hangul: 준호
- RR: Junho
- MR: Chunho

Joon-ho, also spelled Jun-ho, is a Korean given name. Joon-ho was a popular name for baby boys in South Korea for several decades, coming in sixth place in 1970, rising to fourth place in 1980, and falling to seventh place in 1990.

People with this name include:

Entertainers

- Huh Joon-ho (born 1964), South Korean actor
- Bong Joon-ho (born 1969), South Korean filmmaker
- Jung Joon-ho (born 1970), South Korean actor
- Kim Joon-ho (comedian) (born 1975), South Korean comedian and singer
- Son Jun-ho (actor) (born 1983), South Korean actor
- Juno (singer) (born Kim Junho, 1986), South Korean singer
- Lee Jun-ho (singer) (born 1990), South Korean singer, member of boy band 2PM

Sportspeople

- Kang Joon-ho (1928–1990), South Korean boxer
- Lee Joon-ho (speed skater) (born 1965), South Korean short track speed skater
- Jeon Jun-ho (born 1969), South Korean baseball player
- Kang Chun-ho (born 1971), South Korean football player
- Cho Jun-ho (footballer) (born 1973), South Korean football player
- Cho Jun-ho (judoka) (born 1988), South Korean judo practitioner
- Lee Jun-ho (footballer) (born 1989), South Korean football player
- Son Jun-ho (footballer) (born 1992), South Korean football player
- Hong Joon-ho (born 1993), South Korean football player
- Hwang Jun-ho (skier) (born 1993), South Korean cross-country skier
- Kim Jun-ho (speed skater) (born 1995), South Korean speed skater

Others

- Kenneth Bae (born Pae Jun-ho, 1968), South Korean-born American missionary
- Jeon Joonho (born 1969), South Korean artist
- Hwang Jun-ho, a major character from the Netflix series Squid Game (played by Wi Ha-joon)

== See also ==
- List of Korean given names
