= Young-ja =

- Hangul: 영자
- RR: Yeongja
- MR: Yŏngja

Young-ja, also spelled Yeong-ja, is a Korean given name. According to South Korean government data, it was the most popular name for baby girls born in 1940.

The syllable "ja" is generally written using a hanja meaning "child" (子). In Japan, where this character is read ko, it was originally used as suffix for the names of girls in the aristocracy. The practice of adding -ko to girls' names spread to the lower classes following the 1868 Meiji Restoration. Names containing this character, such as Soon-ja and Jeong-ja, became popular when Korea was under Japanese rule from 1910 to 1945, but declined in popularity afterwards. By 1950 there were no names ending in "ja" in the top ten.

== People ==
People with this name include:

- Young-ja Lee (composer) (born 1936), South Korean music educator and composer
- Jung Hye-sun (born Jung Young-ja, 1942), South Korean actress
- Kim Young-ja (born 1949), South Korean volleyball player
- Young-ja Cho (born 1951), South Korean sculptor
- Lee Young-ja (handballer) (born 1964), South Korean team handball player and Olympic medalist
- Yang Young-ja (born 1964), South Korean table tennis player
- Lee Young-ja (comedian) (born 1968), South Korean comedian
- Park Yeong-ja (born 1975), South Korean rower
- Chang Yeong-ja, South Korean financier, one of the principals in the 1982 Lee–Chang scandal

Fictional characters with this name include:

- Yeong-ja, the titular character of the 1975 South Korean film Yeong-ja's Heydays

== See also ==
- List of Korean given names
