= Lee Sang-hun =

- Hangul: 이상훈
- RR: I Sanghun
- MR: I Sanghun

Lee Sang-hun or Lee Sang-hoon (Korean: 이상훈) is a Korean name consisting of the family name Lee and the given name Sang-hun, and may also refer to:

- Lee Sang-hun (athlete) (born 1938), South Korean Olympic runner
- Lee Sang-hoon (baseball) (born 1971), South Korean baseball player
- Lee Sang-hun (basketball), South Korean Olympic basketball
- Lee Sang-hoon (executive), CEO of ABL Bio
- Lee Sang-hun (footballer) (born 1975), South Korean footballer
- Lee Sang-hoon (justice) (born 1956), member of the Supreme Court of Korea
- Lee Sang-hun (musician) (born 2003), trainee of Big Hit Entertainment.
- Lee Sang-hoon (general) (born 1958), 33rd Commandant of the Republic of Korea Marine Corps
- Lee Sang-hoon (tennis) (born 1972), South Korean tennis player

== See also ==
- Lee Sang-heon (disambiguation)
