= Kim Gye-hwan =

South Korean general (born 1968)

36th Commandant of the Marine Corps
- In office 7 December 2022 – 6 December 2024
- President: Yoon Suk Yeol; Han Duck-soo (acting); Choi Sang-mok (acting)
- Preceded by: Kim Tae-sung
- Succeeded by: Ju Il-seok

Personal details
- Born: 1968 (age 57–58) Wonju, Kangwon Province, South Korea
- Education: Korea Naval Academy

Military service
- Allegiance: South Korea
- Branch/service: Republic of Korea Marine Corps
- Years of service: 1986–present
- Rank: Lieutenant general
- Commands: Commandant of the Marine Corps

Kim Gye-hwan (Korean: 김계환; born 1968) is a Republic of Korea Marine Corps lieutenant general who was the 36th Commandant of the Marine Corps from 2022 to 2024.

== Career ==
Kim was born in 1968 in Wonju, Kangwon Province. He entered the Korea Naval Academy and graduated in the 44th class in 1990. After graduated from Naval Academy, he commissioned as Second Lieutenant in the Marine Corps. In 2021, he was promoted to major general and became the commander of the 1st Marine Division. In 2022, he became the Commandant of the Republic of Korea Marine Corps.

== Effective dates of promotion ==
Promotions
Insignia	Rank	Year
	Lieutenant general	2022
	Major general	2021
