= Sang-hoon =

- Hangul: 상훈
- RR: Sanghun
- MR: Sanghun

Sang-hoon, also spelled Sang-hun, is a Korean given name. It was the ninth-most popular name for baby boys in South Korea in 1960 and 1970.

== People ==
People with this name include:

=== Sportspeople ===
- Lee Sang-hun (athlete) (born 1938), South Korean long-distance runner
- Lee Sang-hoon (baseball) (born 1971), South Korean baseball pitcher
- Kim Sang-hoon (born 1973), South Korean football coach and former defender (K League 1)
- Han Sang-hun (born 1980), South Korean baseball infielder
- Han Sang-hoon (born 1984), South Korean badminton player
- Yu Sang-hun (born 1985), South Korean football goalkeeper (K League 1)
- Jeon Sang-hoon (born 1989), South Korean football full back (K League 2)
- Ma Sang-hoon (born 1993), South Korean football defender (Thai League 2)
- Park Sang-hoon (cyclist) (born 1993), South Korean cyclist

=== Fictional ===
- Han Sang-hoon from 2016 television series W (TV series)

=== Others ===
- Kwak Sang-hoon (1896–1980), South Korean politician, Speaker of the National Assembly of South Korea in 1960
- Lee Sang-hoon (general) (born 1958), South Korean general, commandant of the Marine Corps (2015–2017)
- Maeng Sang-hoon (born 1960), South Korean actor
- Choe Sang-hun (born 1962), South Korean journalist
- Jung Sang-hoon (born 1978), South Korean actor

== See also ==
- List of Korean given names
