= Lee Sang-heon =

- Hangul: 이상헌
- RR: I Sangheon
- MR: I Sanghŏn

Lee Sang-heon (Korean: 이상헌) is a Korean name consisting of the family name Lee and the given name Sang-heon, and may also refer to:

- Lee Sang-hun (footballer) (born 1975), South Korean footballer
- Lee Sang-heon (footballer, born 1998), South Korean football midfielder
- Lee Sang-Heon (actor, born 1996), South Korean actor

== See also ==
- Lee Sang-hun (disambiguation)
