= Commandant of the Republic of Korea Marine Corps =

Head of the South Korean marines

- 대한민국의 해병대사령관
- Flag of the Commandant of the Marine Corps
- Incumbent; Lt. Gen. Ju Il-seok since December 6, 2024
- Republic of Korea Marine Corps
- Inaugural holder: Shin Hyun-joon
- Formation: April 15, 1949

The Commandant of the Republic of Korea Marine Corps (Korean: 대한민국의 해병대사령관) is the highest-ranking officer of the South Korean marines. The current commandant is Ju Il-seok, starting from 6 December 2024.

== History ==
The first commandant was Shin Hyun-joon, serving from April 1949 to October 1953. The billet of commandant was disbanded in 1973 and re-established in 1987. The commandant typically holds the rank of lieutenant general (Korean: 중장).

== List ==
No.	Portrait	Commandant of the Marine Corps	Took office	Left office	Time in office	Ref.
Commandant of the Marine Corps
1	Shin Hyun-joon	Major General (Note: Later promoted to lieutenant general.); Shin Hyun-joon (1915–2007)	15 April 1949	15 October 1953	4 years, 183 days	
2	Kim Seok-beom [ko]	Major General; Kim Seok-beom (1915–1998)	15 October 1953	4 September 1957	3 years, 324 days	
3	Kim Dae-shik [ko]	Lieutenant General; Kim Dae-shik (1918–1999)	4 September 1957	24 June 1960	2 years, 294 days	
4	Kim Seung-un [ko]	Lieutenant General; Kim Seung-un (1918–1999)	24 June 1960	1 July 1962	2 years, 7 days	
5	Kim Du-chan	Lieutenant General; Kim Du-chan	1 July 1962	11 July 1964	2 years, 10 days	
6	Gong Jeong-sik [ko]	Lieutenant General; Gong Jeong-sik (1925–2019)	11 July 1964	1 July 1966	1 year, 355 days	
7	Gang Gicheon [ko]	General; Gang Gicheon (1927–2019)	1 July 1966	1 July 1969	3 years, 0 days	
8	Jeong Gwang-ho [ko]	General; Jeong Gwang-ho (1922–2020)	1 July 1969	1 July 1971	2 years, 0 days	
Second Vice Chief of Naval Operations
9	Kim Yeon-sang	Lieutenant General; Kim Yeon-sang	10 October 1973	10 July 1975	1 year, 273 days	
10	Lee Dong-yong [ko]	Lieutenant General; Lee Dong-yong	10 July 1975	31 August 1977	2 years, 52 days	
11	Jeong Tae-seok	Lieutenant General; Jeong Tae-seok	31 August 1977	26 September 1979	2 years, 26 days	
12	Kim Jeong-ho	Lieutenant General; Kim Jeong-ho (1931–2013)	26 September 1979	16 March 1981	1 year, 171 days	
13	Choi Ki-duk [ko]	Lieutenant General; Choi Ki-duk (1930–2016)	16 March 1981	28 December 1982	1 year, 287 days	
14	Park Hee-jae [ko]	Lieutenant General; Park Hee-jae (1932–2020)	28 December 1982	4 September 1984	1 year, 251 days	
15	Seong Byeong-mun	Lieutenant General; Seong Byeong-mun	4 September 1984	3 September 1986	1 year, 364 days	
16	Park Koo-il	Lieutenant General; Park Koo-il (1934–2020)	3 September 1986	31 October 1987	1 year, 58 days	
Commandant of the Marine Corps
(16)	Park Koo-il	Lieutenant General; Park Koo-il (1934–2020)	31 October 1987	3 September 1988	308 days	
17	Choi Gap-jin	Lieutenant General; Choi Gap-jin	3 September 1988	3 September 1990	2 years, 0 days	
18	Jo Gi-yeop	Lieutenant General; Jo Gi-yeop	3 September 1990	30 June 1992	1 year, 301 days	
19	Lim Jong-rin	Lieutenant General; Lim Jong-rin	30 June 1992	30 June 1994	2 years, 0 days	
20	Lee Sang-mu	Lieutenant General; Lee Sang-mu	30 June 1994	29 June 1996	1 year, 365 days	
21	Jeon Do-bong [ko]	Lieutenant General; Jeon Do-bong (born 1942)	29 June 1996	8 April 1998	1 year, 283 days	
22	Lee Gap-jin	Lieutenant General; Lee Gap-jin	8 April 1998	18 October 1999	1 year, 193 days	
23	Kim Myung-hwan	Lieutenant General; Kim Myung-hwan	18 October 1999	11 October 2001	1 year, 358 days	
24	Lee Chul-woo	Lieutenant General; Lee Chul-woo	11 October 2001	22 April 2003	1 year, 193 days	
25	Kim In-sik	Lieutenant General; Kim In-sik	22 April 2003	2 May 2005	2 years, 10 days	
26	Kim Myung-gyun [ko]	Lieutenant General; Kim Myung-gyun	2 May 2005	28 April 2006	361 days	
27	Lee Sang-ro [ko]	Lieutenant General; Lee Sang-ro	28 April 2006	8 April 2008	1 year, 346 days	
28	Lee Hong-hee	Lieutenant General; Lee Hong-hee	8 April 2008	23 June 2010	2 years, 76 days	
29	Yoo Nak-jun	Lieutenant General; Yoo Nak-jun	23 June 2010	18 October 2011	1 year, 117 days	
30	Lee Ho Yeon	Lieutenant General; Lee Ho Yeon	18 October 2011	28 September 2013	1 year, 345 days	
31	Lee Yeong-ju [ko]	Lieutenant General; Lee Yeong-ju (born 1957)	28 September 2013	13 April 2015	1 year, 197 days	
32	Lee Sang-hoon	Lieutenant General; Lee Sang-hoon (born 1959)	13 April 2015	13 April 2017	2 years, 0 days	
33	Jun Jin-goo [ko]	Lieutenant General; Jun Jin-goo (born 1962)	13 April 2017	12 April 2019	1 year, 364 days	
34	Lee Seung-doo [ko]	Lieutenant General; Lee Seung-doo	12 April 2019	13 April 2021	2 years, 1 day	
35	Kim Tae-seong	Lieutenant General; Kim Tae-seong (born 1966)	13 April 2021	7 December 2022	1 year, 238 days	
36	Kim Gye-hwan	Lieutenant General; Kim Gye-hwan (born 1968)	7 December 2022	6 December 2024	1 year, 365 days	
37	Ju Il-seok [ko]	Lieutenant General; Ju Il-seok (born 1969)	6 December 2024		1 year, 275 days	

== Sources ==
- Durand, James (2017). "General Shin Hyun-joon: Father of the Marine Corps" (PDF). International Journal of Korean Studies. XXI.
