= Richard De Wert =

Richard David De Wert
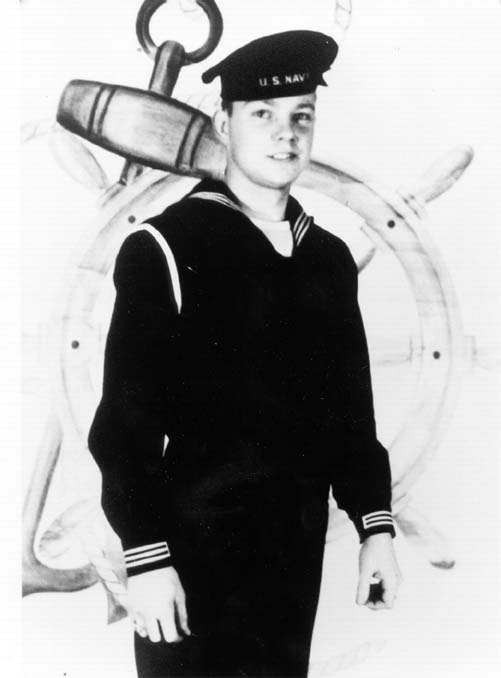
- De Wert in c. 1950
- Born: November 17, 1931; Taunton, Massachusetts
- Died: April 5, 1951 (aged 19); Korea
- Burial place: Massachusetts National Cemetery
- Military career
- Allegiance: United States
- Branch: United States Navy
- Service years: 1948–1951
- Rank: Hospitalman third class
- Unit: 2nd Battalion, 7th Marine Regiment
- Conflicts: Korean War; Battle of Inchon; UN September 1950 counteroffensive; Second Battle of Seoul; UN offensive into North Korea; Battle of Wonsan; Second Phase Offensive; Battle of Chosin Reservoir; Hungnam evacuation; Pohang Operation; Operation Rugged (DOW)
- Awards: Medal of Honor; Purple Heart

Richard David De Wert (November 17, 1931 – April 5, 1951) was a United States Navy hospital corpsman who was killed in action during the Korean War while serving with a Marine Corps rifle company. He was posthumously awarded the nation's highest military decoration for valor, the Medal of Honor, for heroic actions "above and beyond the call of duty" on April 5, 1951, in South Korea.

== Biography ==
Richard De Wert was born on November 17, 1931, in Taunton, Massachusetts.

De Wert enlisted in the United States Navy in December 1948. Following recruit training and Hospital Corps training at Naval Station Great Lakes, Illinois, he was assigned to the Naval Hospital at Portsmouth, Virginia, during 1949–1950. In July 1950, he joined the Fleet Marine Force and soon sailed for the Far East to take part in the Korean War. Landing with the 1st Marine Division at Inchon in September 1950, Hospitalman De Wert participated in operations to liberate the city of Seoul. During the rest of 1950, he was involved in the landing at Wonsan, the Chosin Reservoir Campaign and the Hungnam evacuation.

In 1951, De Wert served with the Marines in anti-guerilla operations and as they helped drive the enemy beyond the 38th Parallel. On April 5, 1951, while with the 2nd Battalion, 7th Marines during an attack on People's Volunteer Army forces during Operation Rugged, De Wert persistently, and in spite of his own wounds, moved through fire-swept ground to aid fallen Marines. He was killed in action while administering first aid to an injured comrade.

== Namesake ==
The frigate USS De Wert was named in honor of Hospitalman De Wert.

A clinic in Newport, Rhode Island, was named after DeWert on September 17, 2004.

The clinic at the Marine Cold Weather Base in Bridgeport, California, was named for DeWert in October 2004.

A scholarship fund at Pepperdine University has been named for DeWert.

Dewert Ave in Taunton, MA is named in his honor.

== Medal of Honor citation ==
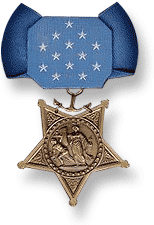

For conspicuous gallantry and intrepidity at the risk of his life above and beyond the call of duty while serving as a[n] HC, in action against enemy aggressor forces. When a fire team from the point platoon of his company was pinned down by a deadly barrage of hostile automatic weapons fire and suffered many casualties, HC Dewert rushed to the assistance of 1 of the more seriously wounded and, despite a painful leg wound sustained while dragging the stricken marine to safety, steadfastly refused medical treatment for himself and immediately dashed back through the fireswept area to carry a second wounded man out of the line of fire. Undaunted by the mounting hail of devastating enemy fire, he bravely moved forward a third time and received another serious wound in the shoulder after discovering that a wounded marine had already died. Still persistent in his refusal to submit to first aid, he resolutely answered the call of a fourth stricken comrade and, while rendering medical assistance, was himself mortally wounded by a burst of enemy fire. His courageous initiative, great personal valor, and heroic spirit of self-sacrifice in the face of overwhelming odds reflect the highest credit upon HC Dewert and enhance the finest traditions of the U.S. Naval Service. He gallantly gave his life for his country.

== Awards and Decorations ==
De Wert's military awards and decorations include:

1st row	Medal of Honor		
2nd row	Purple Heart	Combat Action Ribbon Retroactively Awarded, 1999	Navy Presidential Unit Citation with 1 Service star
3rd row	Navy Good Conduct Medal	National Defense Service Medal	Korean Service Medal with Fleet Marine Force Insignia and 3 Campaign stars
4th row	Korean Presidential Unit Citation	United Nations Service Medal Korea	Korean War Service Medal Retroactively Awarded, 2003

A display of the Medal of Honor and more information about Richard DeWert is on display at the Old Colony Historical Society, in Taunton, Massachusetts.

== See also ==
- List of Korean War Medal of Honor recipients
