= Shin Hyun-joon =

- Hangul: 신현준
- RR: Sin Hyeonjun
- MR: Sin Hyŏnjun

Shin Hyun-joon may refer to:

- Shin Hyun-joon (general) (1915–2007)
- Shin Hyun-joon (actor) (born 1968)
- Shin Hyun-joon (footballer) (born 1983): played in Indonesia and Malaysia.
- Shin Hyoun-jun (born 1986): played for Gangwon FC
- Shin Hyun-jun (footballer) (born 1992) played for Bucheon FC 1995
