= Son Hyun-jun =

South Korean footballer (born 1972)

Son Hyun-Jun
Personal information
- Full name: Son Hyun-Jun
- Date of birth: March 20, 1972 (age 54)
- Place of birth: Saha-gu, Busan, South Korea
- Height: 1.75 m (5 ft 9 in)
- Position: Defender

Team information
- Current team: Gimhae FC (manager)

Youth career
- Dong-A University

Senior career*
Years	Team	Apps	(Gls)
1995–1998	LG Cheetahs / Anyang LG Cheetahs	69	(1)
1999	Busan Daewoo Royals	10	(0)
2000–2003	Anyang LG Cheetahs	40	(0)

Managerial career
- 2004–2005: FC Seoul Reserves (coach)
- 2007–2011: Daegu FC (Chief scout and coach)
- 2012–2014: Gimhae City (coach)
- 2015–2016: Daegu FC (coach)
- 2016: Daegu FC (caretaker)
- 2017: Daegu FC
- 2018–2019: Chuncheon FC
- 2020: Gyeongju Citizen
- 2021–2022: Gimpo FC (Assistant manager)
- 2024–: Gimhae FC
- * Club domestic league appearances and goals

Son Hyun-Jun (Korean: 손현준, born March 20, 1972, in South Korea) is a retired South Korean footballer, who played most of his club football for the Anyang LG Cheetahs. He later managed several football teams, including Daegu FC. He is currently the manager of Gimhae FC.

== Playing career ==
- 1995–1998 : LG Cheetahs / Anyang LG Cheetahs
- 1999 : Pusan Daewoo Royals
- 2000–2003 : Anyang LG Cheetahs

== Managerial career ==
He was the FC Seoul reserve team coach in 2005 and was appointed Daegu FC scouter in December 2006. From 2016 to 2017 he was manager of Daegu FC, initially in a caretaker capacity.

In 2024, Son Hyun-jun was appointed manager of Gimhae FC.

In 2025, led by Son Hyun-jun, the club became champions of K3 League.

== Honours ==
=== Manager ===
Gimhae FC 2008

- K3 League: 2025

Sporting positions
Preceded by Lee Sang-Hun	Anyang LG Cheetahs captain 2001.05–2001	Succeeded by Choi Yoon-Yeol
