= USS De Wert =

United States Navy guided-missile frigate

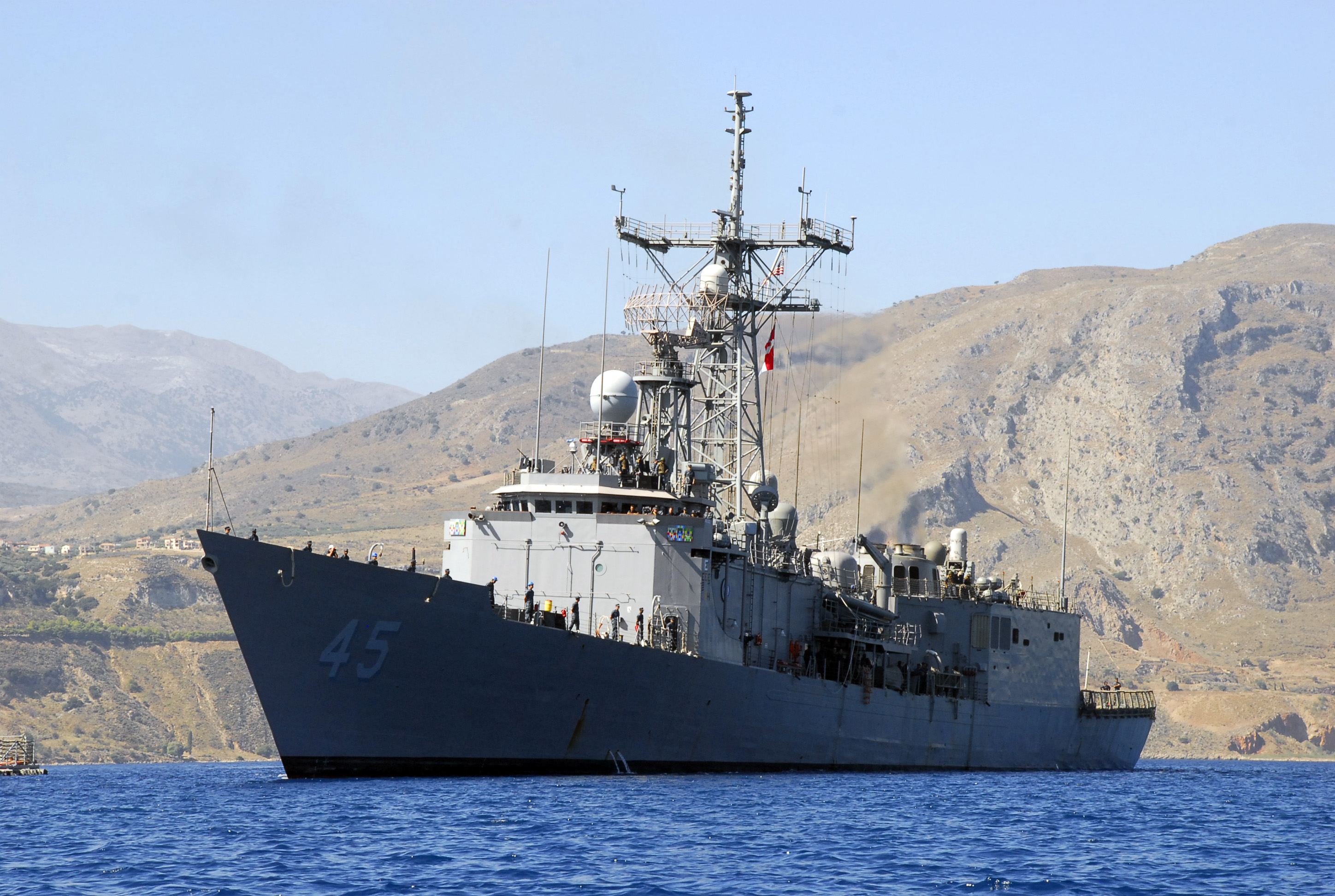
- USS De Wert

History

U.S.
- Name: De Wert
- Namesake: Hospitalman Richard De Wert
- Awarded: 28 April 1980
- Builder: Bath Iron Works, Bath, Maine
- Laid down: 14 June 1982
- Launched: 18 December 1982
- Commissioned: 19 November 1983
- Decommissioned: 4 April 2014
- Stricken: 4 April 2014
- Identification: Hull symbol:FFG-45; Code letters:NRDW
- Motto: "Daring, Dauntless, Defiant"
- Status: Stricken, to be disposed of
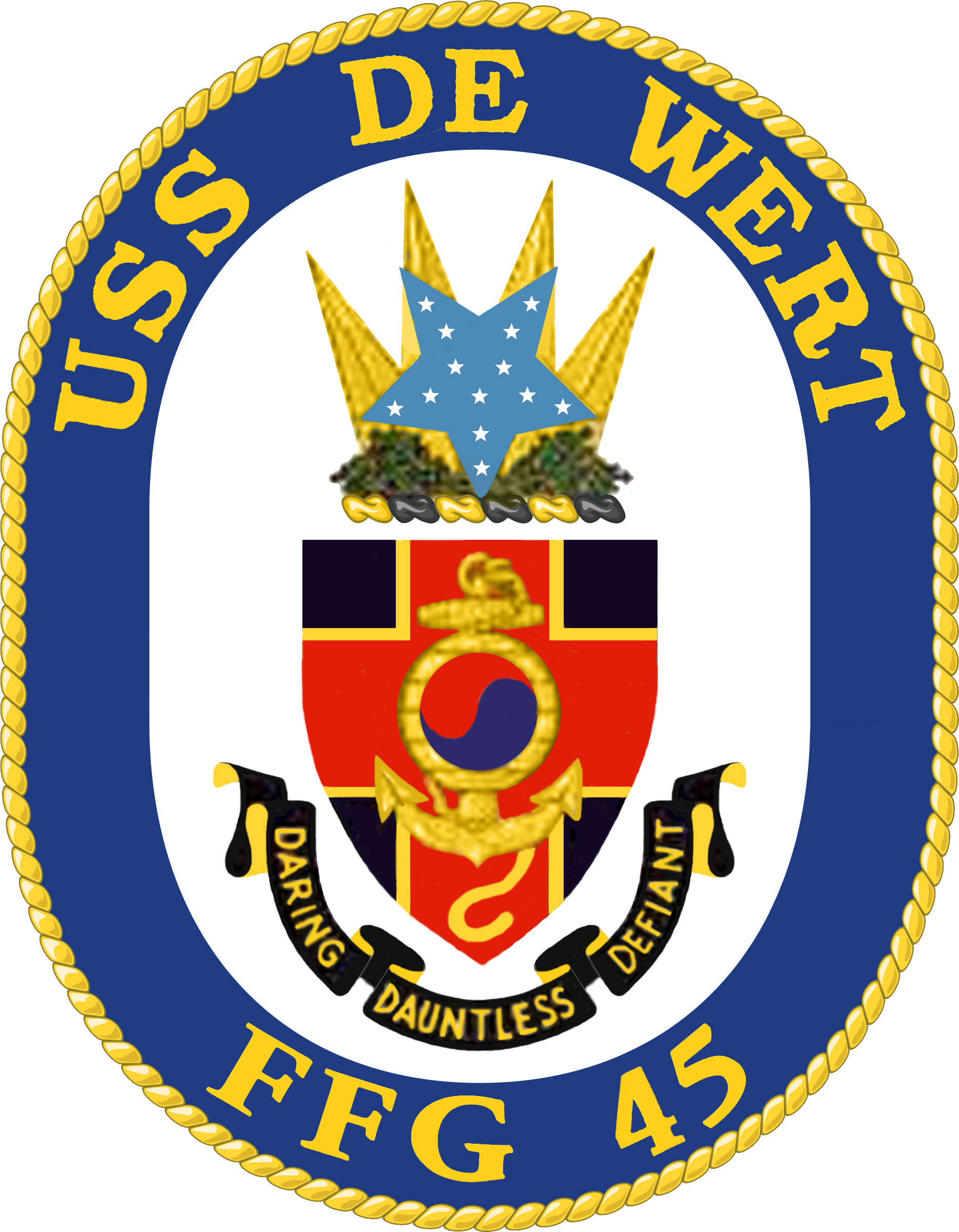
- Badge

General characteristics
- Class & type: Oliver Hazard Perry-class frigate
- Displacement: 4,100 long tons (4,200 t), full load
- Length: 453 feet (138 m), overall
- Beam: 45 feet (14 m)
- Draft: 22 feet (6.7 m)
- Propulsion: 2 × General Electric LM2500-30 gas turbines generating 41,000 shp (31 MW) through a single shaft and variable pitch propeller; 2 × Auxiliary Propulsion Units, 350 hp (260 kW) retractable electric azimuth thrusters for maneuvering and docking.
- Speed: over 29 knots (54 km/h)
- Range: 5,000 nautical miles at 18 knots (9,300 km at 33 km/h)
- Complement: 15 officers and 190 enlisted, plus SH-60 LAMPS detachment of roughly six officer pilots and 15 enlisted maintainers
- Sensors & processing systems: AN/SPS-49 air-search radar; AN/SPS-55 surface-search radar; CAS and STIR fire-control radar; AN/SQS-56 sonar.
- Electronic warfare & decoys: AN/SLQ-32
- Armament: As built: 1 × OTO Melara Mk 75 76 mm/62 caliber naval gun; 2 × Mk 32 triple-tube (324 mm) launchers for Mark 46 torpedoes; 1 × Vulcan Phalanx CIWS; 4 × .50-cal (12.7 mm) machine guns.; 1 × Mk 13 Mod 4 single-arm launcher for Harpoon anti-ship missiles and SM-1MR Standard anti-ship/air missiles (40 round magazine); Note: As of 2004, Mk 13 systems removed from all active US vessels of this class.
- Aircraft carried: 2 × SH-60 LAMPS III helicopters
- Aviation facilities: 2 × hangars; RAST helicopter hauldown system

USS De Wert (FFG-45) is a decommissioned Oliver Hazard Perry-class frigate of the United States Navy. She was named for Hospitalman Richard De Wert (1931–1951). De Wert posthumously received the Medal of Honor for his heroism while serving with the 7th Marines during the Korean War.

De Wert was laid down on 14 June 1982 by the Bath Iron Works, in Bath, Maine; launched on 18 December 1982, sponsored by Reta C. Kennedy; and commissioned on 19 November 1983 at Bath.

Commander Destroyer Squadron Six conducted a Command Administration Inspection 24–26 August 1985. The ship got underway with an air detachment embarked 13 August through 7 September to participate in a Readiness Exercise (READEX 3-85), along with fifteen surface ships, two (2) submarines of the United States Atlantic Fleet and one unit of the Royal Netherlands Navy.

The ship got underway on 2 October for its first major overseas deployment. De Wert joined the Sixth Fleet on 14 October and participated in Operation Display Determination 85, under the command of Commander Task Force 60 with two aircraft carriers embarking 130 aircraft and 16 other warships of the Sixth Fleet. This exercise proved to be predominately an anti-aircraft and anti-submarine warfare exercise. On 24 October De Wert switched deployments with USS Scott (DD 996) from I/O 1-86 to MED 3-85 to enhance the USS Coral Sea battle group's ASW and surface surveillance capability.

- 30Jan86-2Feb86 Freedom of Navigation Operations (Operation Display Dertermination I) in the vicinity of Libya
- 9-14Feb86 Freedom of Navigation Operations (Operation Display Dertermination II) in the vicinity of Libya
- 24Mar86 Freedom of Navigation Operations (Operation Display Dertermination III) in the vicinity of Libya
- 15Apr86 Participated in Libyan Air Strike Operations (Operation El Dorado Canyon)
- 5Nov86-3Dec86 Law Enforcement Operations in the Caribbean (Operation Hat Trick III), resulting in 4 boats and over 50 tons of marijuana seized.

On 16 February 2007, De Wert was awarded the 2006 Battle "E" award.

On 23 May 2008, De Wert departed her homeport at Naval Station Mayport, Florida, for a counter-drug deployment to the Eastern Pacific Ocean. During that deployment she made port visits at Roatán Island, Honduras; Panamá City, Panamá; Salaverry, Perú; Panamá City, Panamá; Curaçao, Netherlands Antilles; and Key West, Florida. She returned to homeport on 6 October 2008.

In 2011, De Wert was awarded the 2010 Battle "E" award, having earned all command excellence awards in calendar year 2010.

On 11 October 2011, De Wert, along with the British Royal Fleet Auxiliary vessel RFA Fort Victoria, rescued the Italian vessel Montecristo after it was boarded by Somali pirates, while on joint anti-piracy operations in the Indian Ocean.

De Wert was decommissioned on 4 April 2014.

== Ship's badge ==
The crest commemorates Richard De Wert's conspicuous gallantry, for which he was awarded the Medal of Honor, represented by the reversed light blue star. The four rays, for hope, represent the four times De Wert courageously exposed himself to enemy fire to save his wounded shipmates. The small stars represent valor; the sprigs of oak, strength. The ship's motto "Daring, Dauntless, Defiant" expresses the courageous sacrifice of De Wert, and serves as an inspiration to the men who man the warship named in his honor. The shield's dark blue and gold are the colors of the Navy. The scarlet cross, edged in gold, represents De Wert's service as a Hospitalman with the United States Marine Corps. The anchor and globe are adapted from the Marine Corps emblem, and also symbolize the world-wide mission of the ship. The taeguk superimposed thereon denotes De Wert's service in Korea, where he gave his life.
