= 1st Marine Division (South Korea) =

Unit of the Republic of Korea Marine Corps

1st Marine Infantry Division
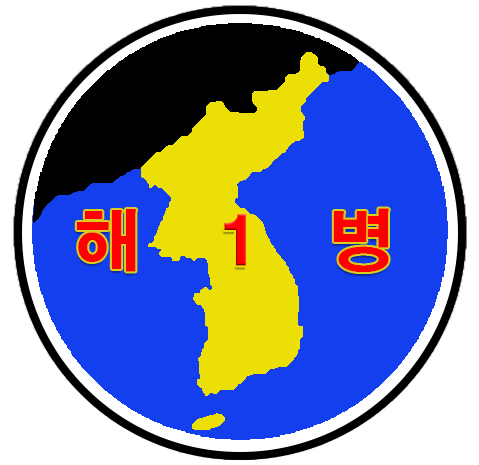
- 1st Marine Infantry Division insignia
- Active: 15 January 1955 – present (71 years, 6 months)
- Country: South Korea
- Branch: Republic of Korea Marine Corps
- Type: Infantry Division
- Size: Division
- Part of: ROK Marine Corps Headquarters
- Garrison/HQ: Pohang, North Gyeongsang Province
- Nickname: Haeryong (Sea Dragon)

The 1st Marine Infantry Division (Korean: 제1해병사단; Hanja: 第1海兵師團), also known as Sea Dragon Division (Korean: 해룡부대; Hanja: 海龍部隊), is an infantry division of the Republic of Korea Marine Corps.

== History ==
In September, before the Inchon Landing, ROKMC regiment size unit was formed and attached to USMC 1st Marine Division. At that time, 1st Marine Division called this unit the ROKMC 1st Marine Regiment for convenience' sake.

On 20 December 1950, ROKMC 1st Marine Regiment was founded and this regiment is one of the parent organization of 1st Marine Division

On 1 February 1954, reorganized into as the ROKMC 1st Marine Brigade.

On 15 January 1955, reorganized into as the ROKMC 1st Marine Division.

== Organization ==
- Headquarters Battalion
- Quick Maneuver Force
- 2nd Marine Brigade (Yellow-Dragon)
  - 21st Marine Battalion
  - 22nd Marine Battalion
  - 23rd Marine Battalion
- 3rd Marine Brigade (King-Kong)
  - 31st Marine Battalion
  - 32nd Marine Battalion
  - 33rd Marine Battalion
- 7th Marine Brigade (Warthog)
  - 71st Marine Battalion
  - 72nd Marine Battalion
  - 73rd Marine Battalion
- 1st Marine Artillery Brigade (Phoenix): equipped with K55/K9A1
  - 2nd Marine Artillery Battalion
  - 3rd Marine Artillery Battalion
  - 7th Marine Artillery Battalion
  - 11th Marine Artillery Battalion
- 1st Tank Battalion: equipped with K1 Main Battle Tank
- 1st Assault Amphibian Vehicle Battalion: equipped with KAAV7A1
- 1st Reconnaissance Battalion
- 1st Engineer Battalion
- 1st Signal Battalion
- 1st Supply Battalion
- 1st Maintenance Battalion

== See also ==
- Republic of Korea Marine Corps
- 2nd Marine Division
