= Lee Sang-hoon (executive) =

South Korean businessman (born 1963)

- 이상훈
- Born: 1963; South Korea
- Education: Seoul National University (BS, MS); Ohio State University (PhD)
- Occupation: Business executive
- Years active: 2016–present
- Title: CEO of ABL Bio

Lee Sang-hoon (Korean: 이상훈; born January 1963) is a South Korean biologist and business executive. He is the founder and CEO of ABL Bio.

In November 2025, Forbes estimated his net worth at US$1.5 billion.

== Early life and education ==
From 1982 to 1989, Lee studied biology at Seoul National University, where he earned a Bachelor of Science, followed by a Master’s degree in developmental biology. In 1994, he completed a Ph.D. in Molecular, Cellular and Developmental Biology at the Ohio State University. Lee completed postdoctoral fellowships at Harvard Medical School, University of California, San Francisco, and Stanford Medical School.

== Career ==
He led research at several companies, including AstraZeneca, Genentech, and Exelixis.

In 2008, Lee co-founded PharmAbcine. He then served as head of the biotech division at Hanwha Solutions.

In 2016, Lee founded ABL Bio. The company listed on the KOSDAQ in 2018.

He became a billionaire in 2025 after ABL Bio signed a licensing and research deal with Eli Lilly.
