= Han Sang-hun =

South Korean baseball player

- Infielder
- Born: June 3, 1980 (age 45); Seoul
- Batted: Left Threw: Right

KBO debut
- April 11, 2003, for the Hanwha Eagles

Last appearance
- October 3, 2015, for the Hanwha Eagles

KBO statistics
- Batting average: .239
- Hits: 606
- Home runs: 12
- RBI: 216
- Stats at Baseball Reference

Teams
- Hanwha Eagles (2003–2015)

- Han Sang-hun
- Hangul: 한상훈
- Hanja: 韓尙勳
- RR: Han Sanghun
- MR: Han Sanghun

Han Sang-hun (born June 3, 1980) is a South Korean former professional baseball infielder who played for the Hanwha Eagles of KBO League.
