= Jeon Sang-hoon =

South Korean footballer (born 1989)

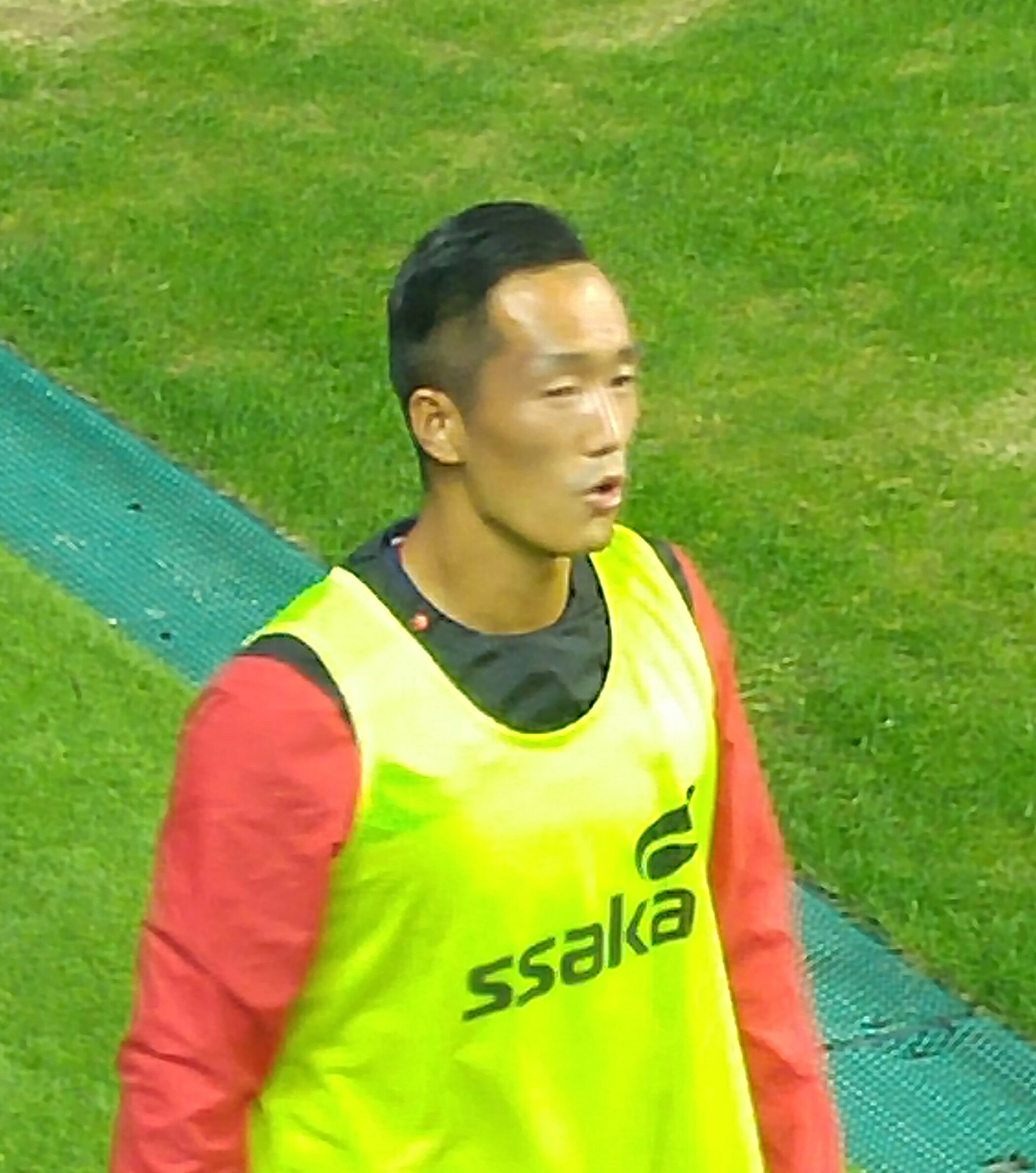

Personal information
- Full name: Jeon Sang-hoon
- Date of birth: 10 September 1989 (age 37)
- Place of birth: South Korea
- Height: 1.75 m (5 ft 9 in)
- Position: Full-back

Team information
- Current team: Daejeon Citizen

Youth career
- 2008–2010: Yonsei University

Senior career*
Years	Team	Apps	(Gls)
2011–2013	Daejeon Citizen	0	(0)
2012–2013	→ Police FC (army)		
2014–2017	Gyeongnam FC	35	(0)
2017–	Daejeon Citizen	16	(0)
- * Club domestic league appearances and goals as of 1 January 2019

Jeon Sang-hoon (Korean: 전상훈; born 10 September 1989) is a South Korean footballer who plays as full-back for Daejeon Citizen in K League 2.

== Career ==
Jeon Sang-hoon was selected by Daejeon Citizen in 2011 K League draft.
