= Shin Hyun-joon (general) =

South Korean general (1915–2007)

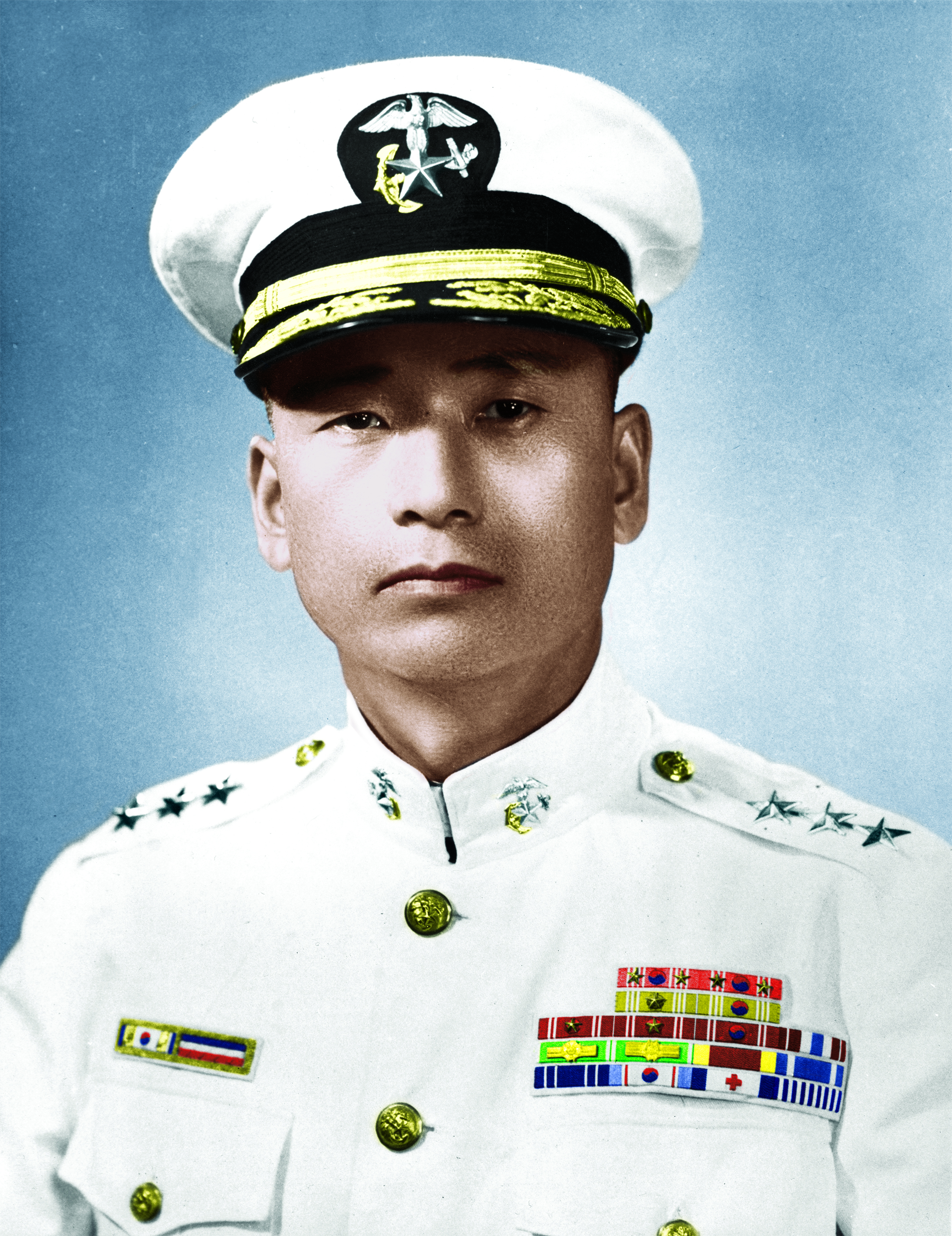

Ambassador of South Korea to the Holy See
- In office 1974–1980

Secretary General of World Anti-Communist League
- In office 1971–1974

Ambassador of South Korea to the Kingdom of Morocco
- In office 1963–1970

Study Abroad in the United States
- In office 1961–1962

Advisor to the Joint Chiefs of Staff and the Department of Defense of ROK
- In office 1953–1961

First Commandant of the Republic of Korea Marine Corps
- In office 1949–1953
- Preceded by: Office established

Personal details
- Born: October 23, 1915 Kinsen, Keishōhoku-dō, Japanese Korea (now Gimcheon, South Korea)
- Died: October 14, 2007 (aged 91) Niceville, Florida, U.S.
- Awards: see Awards and Decorations

Military service
- Allegiance: Manchukuo (1937–1945); South Korea (1946–1961)
- Branch/service: Manchukuo Imperial Army; ROK Marine Corps
- Rank: Lieutenant general
- Commands: Commandant of the Republic of Korea Marine Corps
- Battles/wars: Second Sino-Japanese War; Second World War; Korean War; Battle of Inchon

Shin Hyun-Joon (Korean: 신현준; Hanja: 申鉉俊; October 23, 1915 – October 14, 2007) was the first Commandant of the Republic of Korea Marine Corps. Shin is known as the "Father of the Marine Corps." He is South Korea's longest-serving general, as well as the nation's longest-serving ambassador.

== Early life and education ==
General Shin was born on October 23, 1915, in Geumneung, North Gyeongsang Province, Korea, during the colonial rule of the Empire of Japan over Eastern Asia, which encompassed Korea and China. His family relocated to Manchuria, a province of China, in 1919. Immersed in Chinese culture and educated in Japanese, he attained fluency in Korean, Japanese, and Chinese.

After graduating from Fengtian Military School in 1937, Shin joined the Manchukuo Imperial Army as an officer, marking the beginning of his military career. He served as an instructor in Japanese-administered military schools and in various military units until 1945, when the end of World War II brought a close to 35 years of Japanese colonial rule.

== Creation of the ROK Marine Corps ==
At the end of World War II in 1945, Korea was divided into two occupational zones — the United States occupying the South and the Soviet Union occupying the North. In 1946, Shin joined the South Korean Coast Guard, the predecessor to the Republic of Korea Navy. Following the establishment of the Republic of Korea in August 1948, the Yeosu Rebellion occurred, and Shin was assigned to suppress the uprising. In its aftermath, he recommended the formation of a dedicated unit capable of conducting amphibious landing operations within the Navy — the first step toward the creation of the Korean Marine Corps.

== Korean War ==
On February 1, 1949, Shin was appointed Commandant of the Marine Corps by Admiral Son Won-il, Chief of Naval Operations. The Republic of Korea Marine Corps was formally established on April 15, 1949. Shin commanded the Korean Marines throughout the Korean War (1950–1953).

In September 1950, Shin led the Korean Marines during the Inchon Landing under the command of General Douglas MacArthur, an operation that resulted in the liberation of the South Korean capital, Seoul. In recognition of his role, the U.S. government awarded him the Silver Star medal.

The ROK Marine Corps earned a reputation for rigorous training and ferocity in combat during the Korean War and beyond, giving rise to widely used epithets such as "Ghost-Catching Marines", "Invincible Marines", and "Myth-Making Marines", which remain in use today.

== Pos- Korean War (1953–1962) ==
Following his tenure as Commandant, Shin remained in uniform and organized and led the newly established 1st ROK Marine Brigade and the Marine Education Base. He subsequently served as an advisor to the Chairman of the Joint Chiefs of Staff and the Minister of National Defense. He also pursued further education during this period, including a period of study in the United States.

Shin received seven military awards and decorations from the South Korean government during and after the Korean War.

== Diplomatic career (1963–1980) ==
President Park Chung-hee appointed Shin as South Korea's first Ambassador to the Kingdom of Morocco, with additional accreditation to Liberia. He subsequently served as Secretary General of the World Anti-Communist League.

A landmark in Ambassador Shin's diplomatic career was his appointment as the first resident Ambassador to the Holy See. He was notably accredited during the pontificates of three popes: Pope Paul VI, Pope John Paul I, and Pope John Paul II.

== Later life and death ==
After completing 14 years as an ambassador, Shin and his wife, Hae-ryong, traveled and spent extended periods of time with their children and grandchildren.

Revered as the "Father of the Marine Corps", Shin's frequent visits to Korea were marked by honor guards and gathering of living commandants. In 1999, Shin was presented with a bust in recognition of his leadership during the pivotal moments in Korean history as the first Commandant and the "Father of the Republic of Korea Marine Corps". This bust of General Shin is located at the ROKMC Headquarters in South Korea. On the Corps' 55th Anniversary in 2004, Shin initiated a scholarship for the Marines by donating his modest savings to fund it.

Following the passing of his wife, Hae-ryong, in 2001, Shin moved to Florida to live with his son. There he continued in his passion for learning by further expanding his knowledge in the English language. He passed away peacefully on October 14, 2007 in Florida. His remains were flown to Korea where he received a full military salute at the Marine Corps HQ, followed by a formal procession to the burial site. He was buried with full military honors at the Daejeon National Cemetery in South Korea. Shin had two sons, Ong-mok Shin and Ong-in Shin and four daughters, Cecilia LaForet, Soon-mi Shin, Soon-wha Shin and Maria Abbott, all of whom have settled in different parts of the world.

== Awards and decorations ==
Date	Awards and Decorations
October 1950	Silver Star Medal (United States)
August 1951	Legion of Merit, Degree of Commander (United States)
October 1951	Order of Military Merit, Ulchi with Gold Star
October 1952	Order of Military Merit, Taeguk with Silver Star
December 1952	Order of Military Merit, Chungmu with Gold Star
June 1953	Order of Military Merit, Chungmu
October 1953	Order of Military Merit, Taeguk with Silver Star
February 1954	Legion of Merit, Degree of Chief Commander (United States)
November 1954	Order of Military Merit, Ulchi with Gold Star
December 1962	Order of Military Merit, Chungmu with Silver Star
December 1963	Diplomatic Service Award
January 1964	Great Band (President Tubman of Liberia)
July 1970	Grand Cordon (King Hassan of Morocco)
June 1976	Grand Cross of the Order of Pope Pius IX (Pope Paul VI)
