= Pohang Operation =

Battle of the Korean War

Coordinates: 36.332°N 129.01°E

- Part of the Korean War
Date	10 January – 11 February 1951
Location	near Pohang, Korea
Result	UN victory

Belligerents
United Nations: United States; South Korea	North Korea

Commanders and leaders
General Oliver P. Smith	General Lee Ban Nam

Units involved
(United States) 1st Marine Division (First Republic of Korea) 1st Korean Marine Corps Regiment	10th Division

Casualties and losses
26 killed 10 missing	UN estimate 3,000 casualties

The Pohang Operation was an anti-guerilla operation during the Korean War between United Nations Command (UN) and North Korean forces near Pohang from 10 January to 11 February 1951.

== Background ==
Following their withdrawal from the Battle of the Chosin Reservoir and their evacuation from North Korea in December 1950, the US 1st Marine Division began a period of rest, reorganization and rehabilitation at Masan, South Korea about 200 miles (320 km) south of the UN's Main line of resistance.

When the Chinese People's Volunteer Army (PVA) launched their Third Phase Campaign on 31 December 1950, the Korean People's Army (KPA) simultaneously attacked in eastern Korea breaking through the positions held by the Republic of Korea Army (ROKA). As part of the KPA assault the 10th Division attacked towards Andong. The US Eighth Army alerted the 1st Marine Division to be ready to move 65 miles (105 km) northeast to Pohang, a fishing village about a third of the way up Korea's east coast, in order to protect Eighth Army lines of communication and backstop some shaky ROKA divisions. The Pohang area had great strategic importance because it included a significant stretch of the Eighth Army main supply route (National Route 29), housed several key road junctions, included the only protected port on the east coast still in ROKA/UN hands, and was the site of K-3 one of the few modern airfields in eastern Korea. This mission was confirmed on 8 January, but it had by then been modified to include the entire 1st Marine Division which was not assigned to a corps, but would instead be directly under Eighth Army operational control. The division staff cut orders on 9 January, and the Marines began moving out the next day with the maneuver elements going by truck and the support units by air, rail, and ship.

== Operation ==
The operation began with a week-long movement from Masan to Pohang starting with the departure of the 1st Marine Regiment organized as a regimental combat team, on 10 January. A motor convoy carried elements of the 1st Marines; the division Reconnaissance Company; the 2nd Battalion, 11th Marines; Company C, 1st Engineers; and Company D, 1st Medical Battalion, on a 10-hour journey from Masan to Yongchon. Upon arrival at Uisong the next day, the regimental combat team began patrolling a 30 miles (48 km) section of road. Two days later, the reinforced 1st Battalion, moved 15 miles (24 km) north to occupy Andong. A key crossroads about 40 miles (64 km) inland from the sea, it was the site of US X Corps' rear headquarters as well as two dirt airstrips (one of which was long enough to handle cargo planes, but the other able only to service light observation aircraft and helicopters). With the arrival of the division's two other regimental combat teams, the 5th Marine Regiment patrolled the coast from Pohang to Yongdok and defended K-3, while the 7th Marine Regiment occupied centrally located Topyong-dong. The last Marine units disembarked from LSTs at Pohang on 17 January.

Although there was some limited discussion about small-scale amphibious operations by Eighth Army commander General Matthew Ridgway when he visited the 1st Marine Division command post at Pohang, these never came to fruition. Instead, he ordered the Marines to defend an east-west line just north of the Andong-Yongdok Road and to simultaneously protect the north-south-running Eighth Army main supply route. General Oliver P. Smith faced a dilemma because he was at first uncertain about which of these assignments should receive the highest priority. Should he deploy to guard against an all-out attack on the main line of resistance by PVA/KPA regular forces from the north or be prepared for counter-guerrilla operations against small groups of infiltrators? Intelligence reports indicated that the latter was the most likely course of action. Small KPA bands had already proved extremely troublesome by intermittently cutting supply lines and occasionally attacking outposts between Wonju and Taegu so continued guerrilla actions were considered probable. Smith was well aware that the Marines would not be manning an exposed position. Several ROKA divisions screened the Marine northern flank, the Sea of Japan protected his eastern flank, and hilly terrain made the western approaches inaccessible to armor. Smith, therefore, decided to emphasize mobile security operations and made linear defense a secondary mission.

The enemy threatening Pohang was believed to consist of about 6,000 light infantry troops from Major general Lee Ban Nam's 10th Division. Although a division in name, the 10th was short of personnel and lacked artillery, armor, and motor transport. Its only support weapons were a few heavy mortars and some heavy machine guns. These shortfalls limited Lee's tactical options to hit-and-run raids, roadblocks, and ambushes. The 10th Division was, therefore, expected to conduct low-intensity operations remaining under cover during the day and attacking only in darkness. Lee's troops seeped south through a hole in the fluid ROKA lines east of the Hwacheon Reservoir in central Korea during the UN retreat from North Korea in late-December 1950, and the division's lead elements were thought to be just arriving in the Pohang area in mid-January.

The 1st Marine Division zone of action was roughly 40 miles (64 km) square, an area composed of 1,600 square miles of extremely rugged interior terrain enclosed by a semicircular road network joining the coastal villages of Pohang and Yongdok with the inland towns of Andong and Yongchon. 75 miles (121 km) miles of the vital Eighth Army main supply route were located inside the Marine zone. That part of the supply route ran north from Kyongju to Yongchon then bent about 25 miles (40 km) westward until it once again turned north to pass through Andong. A secondary road (Route 48) joined Andong in the northwest corner with centrally located Chinbo and Yongdok on the coast. The valley lowlands were dotted with small villages whose adjoining terraced rice paddies edged roadways and agricultural flat lands. The center of the Marine area of responsibility consisted of snow-capped mountains traversed only by a series of winding trails and narrow pathways that worked their way up and down the steep ridges. The weather was generally cold and often damp with frequent snow flurries, but with little accumulation. The occasional high winds and overcast hindered flight operations and limited visibility.

On 16 January, Smith opened a forward command post at Sinhung, about 5 miles (8.0 km) southeast of Pohang. Division Operations Order 3-51 assigned the Marines three missions. One was to protect the Kyongju-Pohang-Andong portion of the main supply route. A second was to secure the village of Andong and the two nearby airstrips. The third mission was to prevent penetration in force of the Andong-Yongdok defense line. The long-service veterans of the 1st Marine Division were well aware of the travails of guerrilla warfare. A few senior officers and veteran sergeants had fought local insurgents during the Banana Wars, some others had fought Chinese guerrillas in North China after World War II, and most field grade officers had closely studied the Small Wars Manual at Quantico. These veteran campaigners knew that counter-guerrilla operations were primarily small unit actions that tested individual stamina and required strong leadership at the fire team, squad, and platoon levels. Accordingly, Smith decentralized operations, he created five defensive areas, formed mechanized task forces to patrol the roads, and saturated the hilly terrain with infantry patrols to keep the KPA constantly on the move. The 1st Marines, at Andong, was assigned Zone A in the northwest; the 5th Marines manned Zone B from Yongchon in the southwest quadrant; the 7th Marines operated out of Topyong-dong in Zone C, a centrally located 20 miles (32 km) by 25 miles (40 km) corridor running north from Pohang; the 11th Marine Regiment held a narrow coastal strip north of Pohang known as Zone D; and the 1st Tank Battalion operated in Zone E southeast of Pohang. The light utility aircraft of VMO-6 were in general support.

Anti-guerrilla doctrine called for constant vigilance by static units and aggressive action by mobile forces. A commander's primary concern was force protection, and the best way to accomplish that was to keep the enemy off balance. Guerrillas had to be located, engaged, rendered ineffective, and relentlessly pursued to do this. For large units (regiments or battalions) the favored tactics were "raking" operations and encirclements. Smaller infantry units relied upon saturation patrols to find, fix, and eliminate the enemy. Most of these so-called "rice paddy patrols" consisted of fire teams and squads operating from platoon or company patrol bases. The 5th Marines was particularly aggressive and once had 29 such patrols in the field at the same time. Ambushes were an effective way to keep the enemy off balance by hindering movement and destroying small units piecemeal. Squad and platoon-sized ambushes set up nightly along mountain trails or fanned out to cover likely avenues of approach to nearby villages. Motorized road patrols consisted of machine gun-mounted jeeps that roved the main supply route at irregular intervals. Convoys were escorted by gun trucks, tanks, or self-propelled guns. The anti-guerilla campaign placed a heavy burden on the firing batteries of the 11th Marines. Once the patrols had tracked down groups of KPA, the regiment's batteries had to fire on short notice and in any direction.

The constant patrols harried the KPA and kept it on the run. Lee's troops were forced to break up into ever-shrinking groups just to survive. Soon, hard-pressed guerrilla bands were reduced to foraging instead of fighting. The first contact with the KPA in the Pohang zone occurred on the afternoon of 18 January. A patrol from 3rd Battalion, 1st Marines, discovered an unknown number of KPA east of Andong. The KPA quickly fled, but three were captured. These prisoners from the 27th Regiment confirmed their parent unit was the 10th Division and reported that elements of that division's 25th and 29th Regiments were also in the area. Four days later a patrol from the 1st Marines discovered an estimated KPA battalion near Mukkye-dong south of Andong just before sunset and promptly got the best of a one-sided exchange of small arms and mortars. Company C suffered no casualties while the KPA lost about 200 killed or wounded. Nightfall prevented full pursuit and the KPA escaped under cover of darkness by breaking into squad and platoon-sized exfiltration groups. On 24 January, the 7th Marines began a three-day raking operation to clear the KPA from its zone of action. The KPA retaliated by hitting the regimental command post at Topyong-dong and the 1st Battalion 3 miles (4.8 km) to the northwest, but both attacks by the KPA 25th Regiment failed. On the 26th, 1st Battalion, 7th Marines isolated a KPA company atop Hill 466 that held the attackers at bay with mortars, small arms and hand grenades. The Marines answered with their own artillery, mortars, and automatic weapons. The outgunned KPA quickly abandoned the position after suffering an estimated 50 dead and about twice that many wounded. That same afternoon, 2nd Battalion, 7th Marines repulsed a KPA counterattack and counted 44 KPA dead in the aftermath. During the entire operation, the 7th Marines reported KPA losses at about 250 killed and 500 wounded with a dozen prisoners taken. As a consequence of these losses Lee ordered his troops to cease offensive operations until they could withdraw into the mountains to regroup. The actions at Pohang thus far typified the frustrations of anti-guerrilla warfare. On every occasion the Marines hammered their opponents but were unable to pin down the elusive KPA so decisive action could be affected. 7th Marines commander Colonel Homer Litzenberg said "It became a game, we would find them about 14:00 in the afternoon, get our artillery on them, air on them, and then they would disappear. The next day we would have to find them again." This pattern continued throughout January and February 1951, much as it had in the Moro Rebellion in the Philippines at the turn of the century and would again in the Vietnam War little more than a decade later. But as Litzenburg noted, "the operations in this area constituted a very, very successful field exercise from which we derived great benefit." Smith's aide de camp said "It was excellent training for the new replacements, it gave them the opportunity of getting a conditioning, and an experience of the hardest type of warfare, mountainous warfare, and fast moving situations. They also had the opportunity to utilize supporting fire of all types, including naval gunfire."

In late January Colonel Kim Sung Eun's 1st Korean Marine Corps Regiment (KMC) joined the 1st Marine Division. The KMC brought four rifle battalions (1st, 2nd, 3rd and independent 5th). The original Korean Marines had trained under the tutelage of the 5th Marines while en route to Inchon the previous September. They fought well beside the 1st Marine Division during the liberation of Seoul before being detached for other duties. The Korean Marines were attached administratively to the 1st Marine Division on 21 January, but were not trucked up from Chinhae until about a week later. On 29 January the KMC command post was in place at Yongdok. Smith created a new sector in the northeast to accommodate the new arrivals. This area, Zone F, included Yongdok, Chaegok-tong and Chinandong. The 1st, 2nd and 3rd Battalions patrolled subsectors in Zone F while the 5th Battalion worked with the 1st Marines. The US Marines provided combat and logistics support for their South Korean counterparts. The KMC acquitted themselves well at Pohang and the KMC 1st Regiment would become the 1st Marine Division's fourth rifle regiment for the remainder of the war.

KPA prisoners confirmed signal intercepts and agent reports that the 10th Division had been ordered to leave Pohang to rejoin the KPA II Corps. Concurrently, aerial observers noted a general movement to the west out of the 7th Marines' Zone C into Zones A and B (1st and 5th Marines, respectively). The resulting attempts to slip out of the Marine noose resulted in several very one-sided clashes during the first week of February. On the night of 31 January-1 February, a company-sized patrol from the 1st Battalion, 1st Marines, engaged an estimated KPA battalion near Sanghwa-dong. The KPA suffered about 50 casualties and three KPA were captured along with several mortars and small arms. A few days later 2nd Battalion, 1st Marines and 3rd Battalion, 1st Marines pushed fleeing KPA troops into blocking positions manned by the KMC 22nd Company during a successful "hammer-and-anvil" combined operation. In the 7th Marines zone of action, 3rd Battalion, 7th Marines killed about 45 KPA in a sharp action northwest of Wolmae-dong, and 2nd Battalion, 7th Marines overcame fierce resistance to take Hill 1123. To the southwest, 3rd Battalion, 5th Marines destroyed four roadblocks, killed 30 KPA, and captured three more in the vicinity of Yongchon. 2nd Battalion, 5th Marines occupied Hill 930 after ejecting some stubborn KPA defenders. Along the northern coast, the KMC took Paekchadong and forced its defenders to scatter. A unique approach was tried on 4 February when a loudspeaker-equipped Marine R4D Skytrain transport plane broadcast appeals to surrender. About 150 individuals answered the call, but most of them turned out to be South Korean laborers who had been forced into service by the KPA. F4U Corsairs from VF-323 then dropped bombs, rockets and Napalm upon the remaining KPA. The last major action of the guerrilla hunt occurred when two battalions of the 1st Marines routed an estimated battalion of the KPA 27th Regiment, south of Samgŏ-ri. More than 75 KPA were killed, and an unknown number were seriously wounded by the time the KPA fled the field of battle on 5 February. Only scattered resistance by diehard individuals or small groups was reported to headquarters from then until the Marines departed Pohang. KPA deserters told interrogators that disease and low morale took a heavy toll. They reported a KPA battalion commander had been shot for desertion and that Lee was immobilized by severe depression. Other indicators of KPA desperation were that women were increasingly being drafted to serve as porters and combat troops were donning captured American clothing to cover their escape. Although the 10th Division still could muster about 1,000 men, captured dispatches indicated PVA headquarters ordered the remaining KPA to break out of the Marine encirclement.

Smith's situation report to Eighth Army headquarters on 11 February stated that the KPA had been appreciably reduced and declared "the situation in the Division area is sufficiently in hand to permit the withdrawal of the Division and the assignment of another mission." Armed with this knowledge, intelligence officers at Eighth Army rated the 10th Division as combat ineffective, and Ridgway decided the 1st Marine Division could be put to better use elsewhere.

== Aftermath ==
Marine losses during the period 12 January to 15 February numbered 26 dead, 148 wounded and 10 missing in action. There were also a large number of non-battle casualties, primarily the result of frostbite or minor injuries, most returned to their units. KPA casualties and non-combat losses were estimated at more than 3,000 men.

The Pohang Operation had proven useful for training and physical conditioning of the 1st Marine Division. Constant movement over rough terrain ensured the Marines were in good shape, rifle squads and mortar sections developed into coherent and tactically proficient units, and most of the 3,387 Marine replacements got at least a brief taste of combat conditions.

On 12 February 1951, Smith received a warning order to prepare the 1st Marine Division to move to Chungju in south-central Korea on 24 hours' notice at any time after 07:00, 14 February. Beginning on 16 February, the Marines mounted out from Pohang by regimental combat teams for Chungju. By that time the PVA and KPA were being pounded by air and artillery until their attacks ran out of steam north of Wonju. Thus, when the Marines finally arrived at Chungju, they could be used to spearhead a UN counteroffensive, Operation Killer.

The assessment of the status of the KPA 10th Division would prove to be incorrect; the division had maintained a formal organization of a headquarters and three regiments and with a surviving strength of about 2,000 and had managed by the opening of Operation Ripper on 7 March 1951 to slip north through the Taebaek Mountains to the Irwol Mountain region, 30 miles (48 km) northeast of Andong. Easily withstanding further efforts of the ROKA 2nd Infantry Division to eliminate it, the division by 13 March reached the Chungbong Mountain area, about 25 miles (40 km) miles south of Gangneung. The remnants of the division, approximately 1,000 men eventually returned to KPA lines on 23 March 1951, however the division would not see frontline action again.
