= Republic of Korea Marine Corps =

Amphibious warfare branch of South Korea's military

- 대한민국 해병대 大韓民國 海兵隊; Daehanminguk Haebyeongdae
- Seal of the Republic of Korea Marine Corps
- Founded: 15 April 1949
- Country: South Korea
- Type: Maritime land force
- Role: Amphibious warfare
- Size: 29,000 men (2026)
- Part of: Republic of Korea Navy
- Headquarters: HQ Republic of Korea Marine Corps Hwaseong, Gyeonggi, South Korea
- Nicknames: 무적해병 ('Invincible Marines'); 귀신 잡는 해병대 ('Ghost Killers'); 신화를 남긴 해병대 ('Legend Makers')
- Mottos: 정의와 자유를 위하여 ('For Justice and Freedom'); 필승 ('Certain Victory')
- March: "나가자 해병대" (English: Let's Go Marine Corps)
- Mascot: Jindo Dog
- Anniversaries: 15 April
- Engagements: Korean War; Vietnam War; Global War on Terrorism; 2010 Yeonpyeongdo bombardment
- Website: rokmc.mil.kr

Commanders
- President: Lee Jae-Myung
- Minister of National Defense: Kang Shin-chul
- Chief of Naval Operations: Admiral Kang Dong-gil
- Commandant of the Marine Corps: Lieutenant General Ju Il-Seok
- Assistant Commandant of the Marine Corps: Major General

Insignia
- Flag

The Republic of Korea Marine Corps (ROKMC; Korean: 대한민국 해병대; Hanja: 大韓民國 海兵隊; RR: Daehanminguk Haebyeongdae), also known as the ROK Marine Corps, ROK Marines or South Korean marines, is the naval infantry of South Korea. The ROKMC is a branch of the Republic of Korea Navy responsible for amphibious operations, and also functions as a rapid reaction force and a strategic reserve.

The ROKMC was initially founded in 1949 under Imperial Japanese Army military doctrine as a suppression operations force against communist partisans. The ROKMC fought extensively throughout the Korean War and in combat operations during the Vietnam War. In modern times, the ROKMC has been involved in coalition military operations in the Persian Gulf War, the Iraq War, and the War in Afghanistan.

The ROK Marine Corps, with 29,000 personnel, is organized into two divisions and two separate brigades under the Headquarters ROK Marine Corps. The ROK Marine Corps has about 300 tracked vehicles including assault amphibious vehicles, main battle tanks, and self-propelled artillery.

== History ==
=== Founding years ===
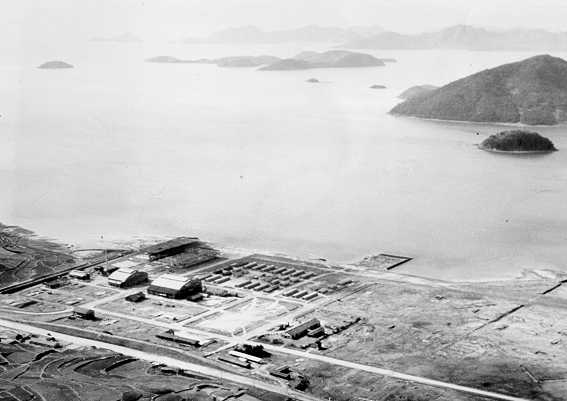
Deoksan airfield (present-day Jinhae naval airfield) circa 1950

On April 15, 1949, the Republic of Korea Marine Corps (ROKMC) was founded at Deoksan airfield in Chinhae with an initial strength of 380 men. Lieutenant colonel Shin Hyun-joon was appointed to lead as the first Commandant of the newly formed Marine Corps and he was promoted to colonel on July 1, 1949. The ROKMC consisted of two rifle companies and a headquarters company equipped with many secondhand weapons from the Imperial Japanese Army (IJA) used during World War II, including the 7.7 millimeters (0.30 in) Type 99 Light Machine Gun. It was soon reorganized into an infantry battalion with three rifle companies. Initially no United States Marine Corps (USMC) or United States Army advisers were attached to the unit and its doctrine and training was based on that of the IJA.

In September 1949 two rifle companies were sent to Jinju on anti-guerilla operations and in December the entire battalion was sent to Jeju-do for anti-guerilla operations following the Cheju rebellion. A 37 mm anti-tank platoon was added to the battalion in this period.

=== Korean War ===
During the Korean War, ROK Marine Corps earned the nickname of the '귀신 잡는 해병대' which means 'Marine Corps the Ghost Killers'.

Following the start of the Korean War on 25 June 1950, the Ko Kil-hun Unit (Marine Rifle Battalion) landed Gunsan on 16 July and Kim Sung-un Unit (Marine Rifle Battalion) landed Tongyong peninsula on 17 August where they delayed the advance of the Korean People's Army (KPA) forces, The Marines were rapidly expanded to three battalions and took part in fighting at Mokpo, Changhang, Chindongri, Jinju, Namwon and Masan.

On 23 August the Marines landed on Kueje Island and fought a KPA force there until 15 September.

Before the Inchon Landing, ROKMC regiment size unit was formed and attached to USMC 1st Marine Division. At that time, 1st Marine Division called this unit as the ROKMC 1st Marine Regiment for convenience' sake. (Officially, ROKMC ROKMC 1st Marine Regiment was founded on 20 December 1950.)

On 5 September operational control of the Regiment was passed to the USMC 5th Marine Regiment and after undergoing further training by Korean Military Advisory Group (KMAG) advisers at Pusan the regiment was embarked on USS Pickaway on 12 September and sailed for Inchon.

On the afternoon of 15 September the regiment landed at Red Beach, Inchon and was assigned the task of mopping up KPA forces in Inchon. The next day the USMC 5th Marine Regiment and 1st Marine Regiment were ordered to move along the Inchon-Seoul highway and capture Kimpo Air Base. The ROKMC 3rd Battalion was assigned to protect the 5th Marines left flank and capture high ground near Ascom City west of Kimpo. On the morning of 17 September the ROKMC 3rd Battalion began clearing Ascom City, a two square mile maze of huts in which many KPA had taken shelter. The Ascom City area was eventually secured on 18 September On 19 September after advancing to the Han River near Seoul the 5th Marines were ordered to cross the Han River near Haengju-dong, seize Hill 125 and then move southeast along the railway lines. The ROKMC 2nd Battalion crossed the Han on Amphibious Tractors and occupied Hill 95 overlooking the crossing site. Meanwhile, the ROKMC 3rd Battalion at Kimpo called in airstrikes against a KPA unit forming up to try to retake the airfield. On 22 September the ROKMC 1st Battalion with the 3rd Battalion, 5th Marines and 1st Battalion, 5th Marines began advancing into Seoul, meeting heavy KPA resistance the ROKMC 1st was forced to retreat to its starting point. On 23 September the ROKMC 1st Regiment renewed their attack but were met by heavy fire losing 32 killed and 68 wounded. The Regiment 1st Regiment was withdrawn into reserve and replaced by the ROKMC 2nd Battalion, while the 5th Marines eventually overran the KPA strongpoint on Hill 105S. On 25 September the USMC began their final assault on Seoul with the ROKMC 2nd Regiment assigned to the 1st Marines to move through the central city to the northeast while the ROKMC 1st Regiment assigned to the 5th Marines would seize the Capital Building and the northwest of the city. Meeting a stubborn defense from entrenched KPA forces the 7th Marine Regiment joined the battle on 26 September. By the afternoon of 28 September the center of the city had been cleared of KPA troops and on 29 September despite ongoing fighting in the suburbs the Government of Korea was formally reinstated in Seoul. The Regiment less the 1st and 3rd Battalions was deployed 18 miles (29 km) east of Seoul to block the KPA retreat but encountered only scattered resistance.

On 18 October the ROKMC three battalions were embarked on ships for the landing at Wonsan, eventually going ashore there on 25 October. On 2 November the Regiment was given responsibility for the zone south of the 39th Parallel. In late November the Regiment was attached to the U.S. 3rd Infantry Division. Following the attacks by the Chinese People's Volunteer Army (PVA) in the Battle of Chosin Reservoir the Regiment withdrew to Wonsan to cover the evacuation of United Nations Command (UN) Forces. Between 7 and 9 December the 1st and ROKMC 3rd Battalions were evacuated from Wonsan by ship, while on 15 December the 2nd and ROKMC 5th Battalions were evacuated by air from Hungnam. The Regiment reformed at Jinhae in mid-December.

After a period of rest and refitting, including training by USMC advisers, the Regiment was assigned to the 1st Marine Division in mid-January 1951. On 24 January the Regiment joined the 1st Marine Division which was conducting anti-guerilla operations against the KPA 10th Division. On 12 February the Regiment, less the 5th Battalion, was attached to the Republic of Korea Army (ROK) Capital Division at Samcheok. The 5th Battalion meanwhile was sent to Inchon and then occupied the Kimpo peninsula, it would operate independently from the Regiment until March 1952.

On 17 March 1951 as they participated in Operation Ripper the Regiment was permanently attached to the 1st Marine Division and the 3rd Battalion, 11th Marines was assigned to provide artillery support to the Regiment. Ripper was followed immediately by Operation Rugged and then Operation Dauntless in which the Regiment crossed the Bukhan River and captured the Hwacheon Dam. The Chinese Spring Offensive which started on 22 April was met with a strong defence by the 1st and ROKMC 2nd Battalions and the 5th Marines and by 23 April they had successfully repelled the PVA attacks. However, with neighbouring units withdrawing the Marines were ordered back to the high ground between the Soyang and Hongcheon Rivers. With the PVA offensive blunted by 20 May the UN launched its May–June 1951 counteroffensive and on 22 May the Regiment made its initial advance to take objectives 3 miles (4.8 km) north of the front. The advance made rapid progress and by the end of May the Regiment was on the south bank of the Hwacheon Reservoir where it was relieved on 2 June by the ROK 3rd Regiment.

On 4 June 1951 the Regiment was brought out of reserve to join the 1st Marine Division in an assault on the PVA/KPA main line of resistance along a mountain range extending from Yanggu to Hill 1316 (Daeamsan). The area was defended by a regiment of the KPA 12th Division with orders to hold the position until death. from 4 to 9 June the Regiment fought the KPA making limited progress. Finally on 10 June the Regiment commander Colonel Kim Tae Shik decided to make a night attack on the KPA positions. Launched at 02:00 on 11 June the attack caught the KPA unprepared and the Marines quickly overran Hill 1122 and the rest of the ridgeline. Following the capture of Daeamsan the Marines continued to push against the PVA/KPA to obtain better positions. On 15 June the ROKMC 2nd Battalion attacked north to Hill 1304 which it captured the next day. The ROKMC 3rd Battalion moved northwest and captured Dusol-san (38.24°N 128.096°E) following which they dug in. On 7 July the Regiment was ordered to take Daeusan (38.268°N 128.077°E), beginning their attack on 8 July. After suffering over 220 casualties the attack was called off on 12 July.

The Regiment and the 1st Marine Division went into reserve and the Regiment received intensive training from USMC advisers. At the end of this period it was organized like a USMC regiment with three infantry battalions, a regimental headquarters, a 4.2-inch mortar company and a 75 mm recoilless rifle platoon. Lieutenant Colonel Kim Dong Ha, who replaced the wounded Colonel Kim Tae Shik as Regiment commander.

On 27 August the 1st Marine Division and the Regiment returned to the frontline to lead the Battle of the Punchbowl ultimately gaining control of the line of hills north of the Punchbowl by 21 September.

Following the Battle of the Punchbowl the fighting stabilized into static warfare with numerous foot patrols far into PVA/KPA territory and company-strength tank-infantry raids. Throughout the remainder of 1951, the 1st Marine Division continued to occupy the eastern portion of the X Corps defense sector in east-central Korea. From left to right the ROKMC 1st Regiment, 7th Marines and 1st Marines held the main line of resistance with two battalions each. The 5th Marines remained in reserve until 11 November when it relieved the 1st Marines, which went into reserve. As Marines continued patrols and efforts to improve their defenses, the ROKMC added its own artillery support, the 1st Korean Artillery Battalion consisting of two medium (155 mm) and two light (105 mm) howitzer batteries.

In early 1952 the ROKMC 2nd Regiment, commanded by Lieutenant Colonel Kim Doo Chan, was organized as were engineer and medical companies. In the spring of 1952, the 1st Marine Division, along with the ROKMC 1st Regiment, received orders to move across the peninsula to western Korea. The regiment was the first unit to move to its new positions along the extreme left flank of the Eighth Army, where it was given the mission of guarding the approaches to Seoul along the Jamestown Line. By 24 March, the 1st Marine Division and ROKMC 1st Regiment had relieved elements of the ROK 1st Division along the left sector of the main line of resistance, adjacent to the 1st Commonwealth Division, and were in position to continue sector outpost security and ground defense in what had become a war of attrition.

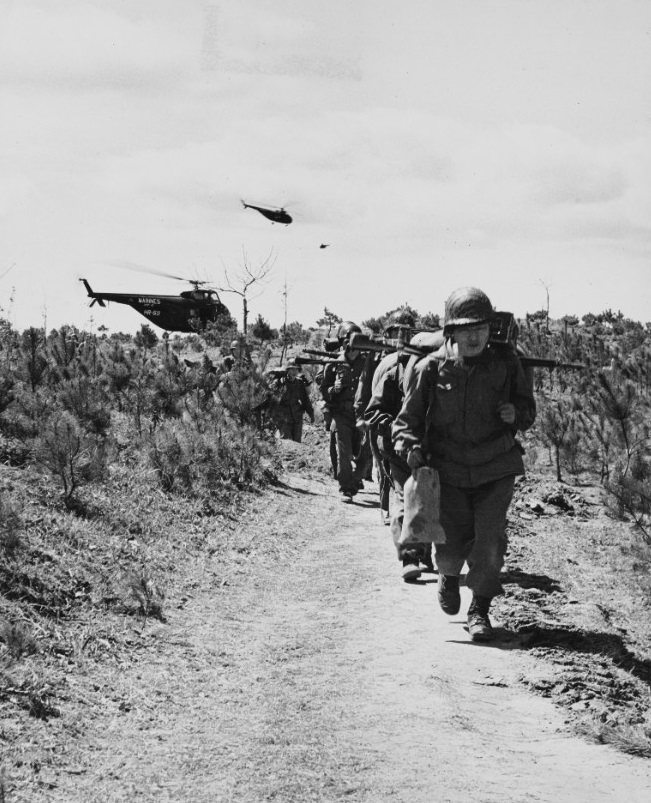
U.S. Marine Sikorsky HRS helicopters disembarking South Korean marines in April 1952

On 20 March 1952 the ROKMC 1st Regiment assumed responsibility for its portion of the Jamestown Line between the Kimpo Provisional Regiment and the 1st Marines (replaced by the 5th Marines on 29 March. From 25 to 31 March the PVA made five separate probing attacks against the ROKMC 1st Regiment. On 1 April the KPA launched an attack on the ROKMC 1st Regiment positions in an attempt to capture the Freedom Gate Bridge over the Imjin River but were pushed back by dawn on 2 April. On 12–13 April the PVA increased their attacks by fire and infantry probes of the 1st Marine Division sector and on the night of 17 April launched an attack on the ROKMC 1st Regiment positions but this was beaten back with small arms and artillery fire with the ROKMC 1st Regiment losing two dead while the PVA lost 36 killed. On 23 and 24 April the 1st Marine Division withdrew from most of its outpost line reducing the vulnerability of these isolated positions and strengthening the main line of resistance.

On 5 May 1952, the Korean Marine Corps Tank Company was formed consisting of 181 men with 17 M4 Sherman tanks and one tank retriever. The company received its training in combat under the direction of USMC Company A, 1st Tank Battalion. The entire company was committed on 12 July to relieve Company A in support of the ROKMC 1st Regiment. Following a period of small unit actions along the main line of resistance, starting in August the ROKMC 1st Regiment participated in the Battle of Bunker Hill. On the night of 31 October 1952 as the ROKMC 5th Battalion was relieving the ROKMC 3rd Battalion on the right of the Regiment's position the PVA attacked the positions. Both Battalions held their positions and the PVA withdrew before dawn on 1 November leaving more than 295 dead.

In early May 1953 the ROKMC 1st Regiment went into reserve, returning to the frontline in July when it defended its positions against PVA probes during the Battle of the Berlin Outposts and Boulder City.

With the end of the war on 27 July 1953 the Korean Marines had killed an estimated 22,070 PVA/KPA while suffering 2,529 casualties.

In 1955, the 1st Marine Division was established.

=== Vietnam War and the 1970s ===
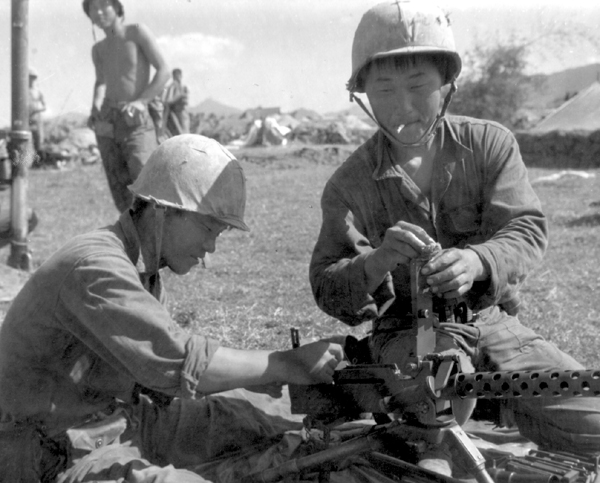
South Korean marines prepare defensive positions near Tuy Hòa, South Vietnam circa 1965

South Korean President Park Chung Hee asked to participate in the Many Flags program and sent military units to South Vietnam, despite opposition from both the Assembly and the public. In exchange, the United States agreed to reimburse additional military budgets to South Korea to help modernize its armed forces, totaling about a billion dollars.

The three main units deployed to Vietnam were the ROKMC's 2nd Marine Brigade (Blue Dragon Brigade) (Korean: 청룡부대; Hanja: 靑龍部隊; Cheongryeong Budae.), Republic of Korea Army (ROKA) Capital Division (Fierce Tiger Division, 맹호부대) and the 9th Infantry Division (White Horse Division, 백마부대). Various South Korean special forces units were also deployed. The ROKA's Tactical Area of Responsibility was the southern half of the I Corps. The ROKMC was deployed with the I Corps, alongside the U.S. Marines.

In 1974, Commander Lee Dong-Yong of the 1st Marine Division modified the 1st Division's infantry regiment to specialize each of its three battalions to Airborne/Amphibious Infiltration/Ranger. This system distinguishes the 1st Marine Division from other ROKMC divisions and brigades.

=== 1980s ===
In 1982, ROKMC established the "812th 'Hammer' Unit"; their mission was to perform retaliation operations against KPA forces. The unit's motto was "Kill 'em all, Let God sort 'em out." Their training included a 10 kilometres (6.2 mi) ruck march in an hour with full combat gear, and carrying a 100 kg IBS(Inflatable Boat Small) overhead. Training also included 12 km continuous sea swimming.

In November 1987, the Headquarters Republic of Korea Marine Corps was re-established; it was disbanded in October 1973 due to budgetary constraints.

=== 2010s ===
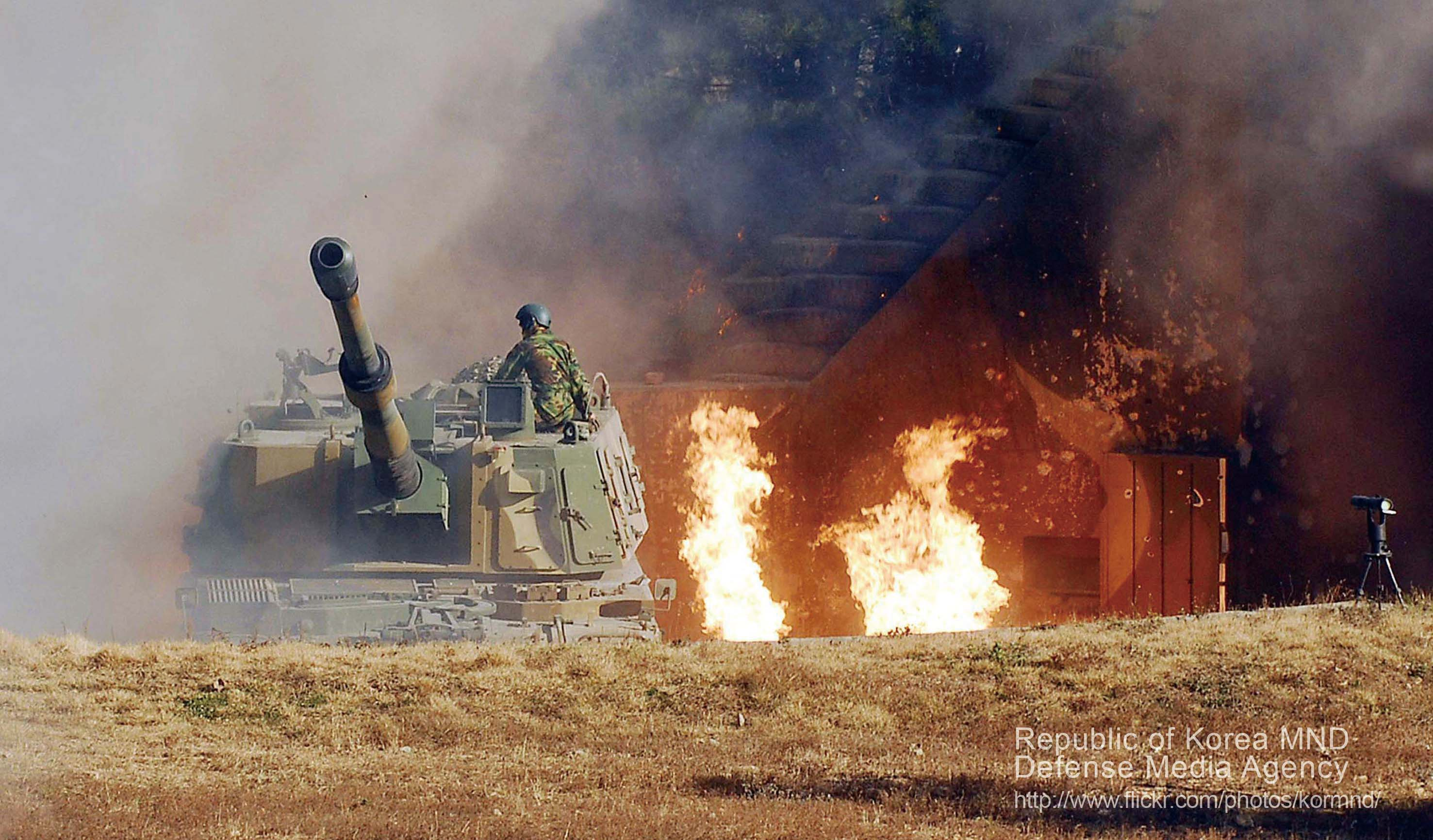
ROKMC K9 self-propelled howitzer preparing a counterattack after the initial attack from North Korea

On November 23, 2010, the Bombardment of Yeonpyeong incident occurred. There was a rigorous engagement between the North Korean Army and a South Korean Marine Corps YP unit. As a result of this event, the South Korean government cancelled its Military Reform Plan 2020 which was to downsize the number of Marine Corps personnel deployed in North-West islands. Instead, the South Korean government established the Military Reform Plan 307 (Plan 307).

Plan 307 affected ROKMC by deploying new ARTHUR artillery hunting radar to North-West islands until February 2012.

With Plan 307, Northwest Islands Defense Command (NWIDC) was established on June 15, 2011. ROKMC Commandant holds an additional position as NWIDC commander. With NWIDC, ROKMC Commandant can command Army, Navy, Airforce under NWIDC branch in actual combat situation.

Plan 307 also includes a plan to fortify all 5 islands in the North-West area until 2015 by constructing bunkers for tanks, K-9 Thunder, K-10 ARV and civilians, digging trenches, establishing Guided-Missile unit which is equipped with 60 Spike missiles and 4 launchers, deploying the Hostile Artillery Locating System (HALO) which is manufactured by the Selex Galileo company, creating an AH-1S Cobra unit under the 6th Marine Brigade in Baengnyeongdo, increasing size of artillery units in Yeonpyeong from company to battalion which changed their number of K-9 Thunder from 6 to 18, deploying the K-SAM Chunma and the K-136 multiple rocket launcher to North-West islands and increasing numbers of marines in North-West islands by more than 1000. On June 23, 2011, the South Korean National Assembly legislated a law that states the right that personnel management can be exercised by the ROKMC Commandant instead of the ROKN Chief of Naval Operations (Until 2011, the CNO exercised the latter), legislating the ROKMC Deputy Commandant, dividing and specifying ROKMC's main operation as 'amphibious operations' from ROKN 'naval operations', including the ROKMC Commandant as a formal member of the joint chiefs of the staff council, legislating the ROKMC Commandant as a member of the Defense Project Promotion Committee, giving him rights to select the uniform from CNO to the ROKMC Commandant and making the latter exercise the rights of the Management of Military Supplies of the ROKMC.

By dividing the ROKMC's main operation from ROKN, ROKMC made a stepping-stone to become a National Strategic Mobile Force.

On October 15, 2011, The law mentioned above took effect. ROKMC retrieved their record of service back from ROKN on October 13. ROKMC started issuing new uniforms since October 1. The ROKMC used to wear their own distinct uniforms before 1973, but after the ROKMC HQ were dissolved, South Korean marines had to wear uniforms similar to those used by the South Korean navy (sans the sailor caps). This new uniform is different from the new uniform of the ROKA, ROKN and the ROKAF (these 3 forces use same uniform). The new uniform was designed to camouflage marine personnel for amphibious operations by using colors of beach, sand and seaweed.

On June 4, 2012, Ministry of National Defense confirmed a plan to distribute 32 amphibious mobile helicopters to ROKMC. The ROKMC scheduled to activate an aviation group between 2017 and 2020 with 2 amphibious mobile helicopter battalions and 1 attack helicopter battalion with Colonel in chief.

=== 2020s ===
On November 21, 2023, the Marine Corps of the Armed Forces of the Republic of Korea held first exercises in last 5 years in the city of Pohang, in which about 3,400 marines, more than 30 amphibious assault vehicles and 10 Navy ships took part. During the exercises, amphibious landings in the coastal zone were practiced using amphibious ships, transport aircraft and helicopters, while Navy ships and attack helicopters provided cover for the troops. In late 2025, the Minister of National Defense Ahn Gyu-back announced plans to reform the Marine Corps including the promotion of the Marine Corps Commandant to four star rank and to review the creation of a separate Marine Corps operations command.

== Organization ==
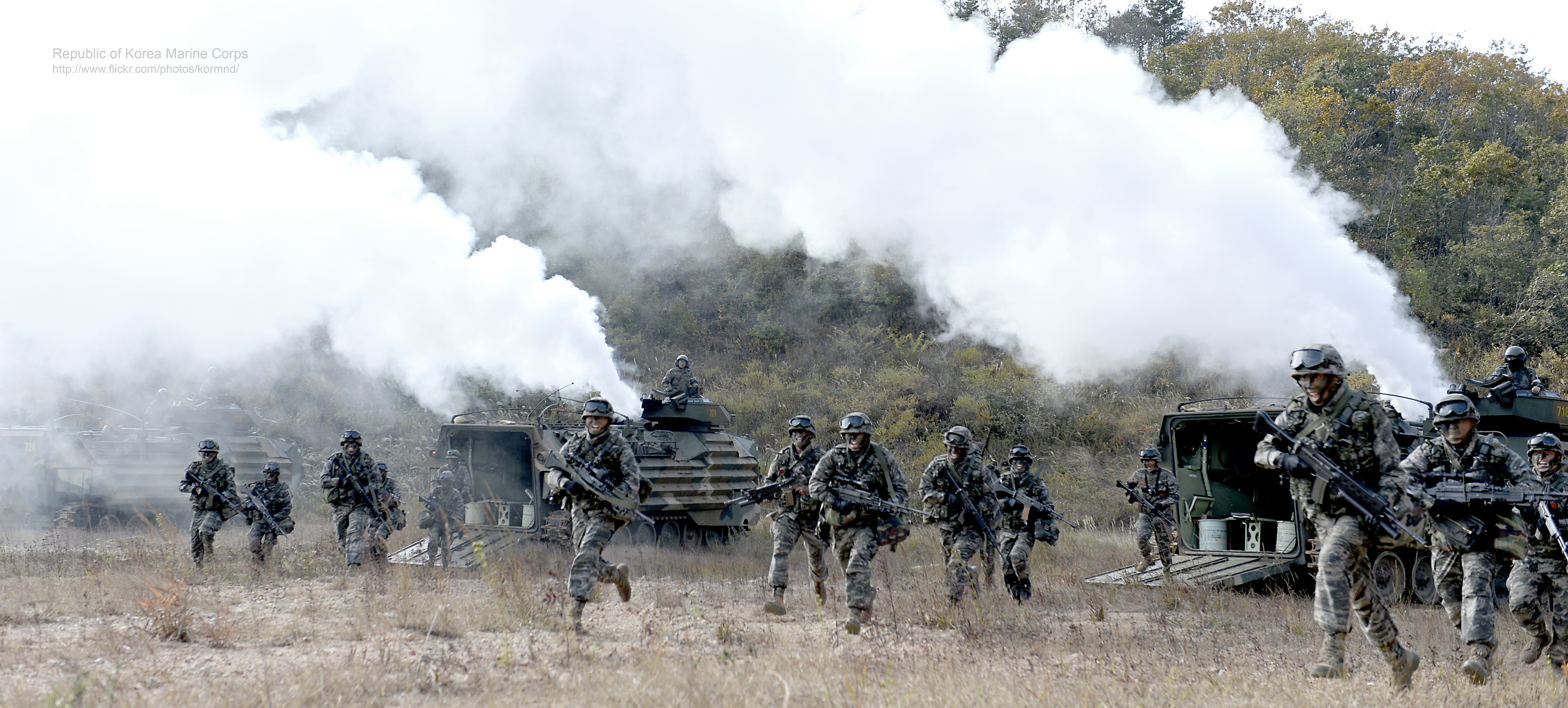
ROK Marines conducting Northwest Islands defense training

The marine corps, with 29,000 personnel, is organized into two divisions and two brigades under the Headquarters Republic of Korea Marine Corps. The Commandant of the Republic of Korea Marine Corps is a three-star general. After the bombardment of Yeonpyeong, the Commandant of the ROKMC also holds the commander position of the NWIDC (Northwest Islands Defense Command). The 1st Marine Division can operate in sea, air, land, with specializing its three infantry battalions under a single regiment to Airborne/Amphibious Assault/Ranger. Furthermore, the ROKMC's Recon units (two Reconnaissance Battalions and one Reconnaissance Company) hold various special warfare trainings such as scuba and parachuting.

The ROKMC relies on the ROK Navy for medical treatment of its wounded, as specially trained Navy medics are to some extent integrated into the Marine Corps' units and also instructing fundamental first-aid techniques to new recruits (similar to the US Navy's Corpsmen).

=== Quick Maneuver Force ===
In March 2016, the South Korean defense ministry announced the formation of a Quick Maneuver Force (nickname: "Spartan 3000", size - regiment consisting of 3,000 of South Korean marines.) The unit will be combat ready to be deployed in any part of the Korean Peninsula within 24 hours in case of an attack from the DPRK forces and will be responsible for targeting high priority targets in North Korea including nuclear facilities. This new announcement also aims to make the ROK deployment strategy more efficient as it aims to be able to deploy a ROKMC regiment within 24 hours instead of the current 48 hours.

On 2 May 2016, Quick Maneuver Force was launched with the official name: "ROK Navy·Marine Corps Quick Maneuver Force" (대한민국 해군·해병대 신속기동부대) and official nickname: "Jeseung Unit" (제승부대, 제승(制勝) means guarantee victory).

Currently, official name is "ROK Marine Corps Quick Maneuver Force" (대한민국 해병대 신속기동부대) and 2 brigades in the 1st Marine Division undertake a task of the Quick Maneuver Force in turn.

- Confusion with ROK Army 13th Special Mission Brigade (Decapitation Unit)

On 4 September 2017, South Korean Minister of National Defense, Song Young-moo announced that "Decapitation Unit (참수부대)" would be established in December 2017.

Some western news outlets misunderstood and announced that the unit called "Spartan 3000" with the task of "Decapitation Unit (참수부대)" would be established by the end of the 2017.

"Spartan 3000" was a nickname of the ROK Marine Corps Quick Maneuver Force and this unit was already fully formed in March 2016.

13th Special Forces Brigade was reorganized into as the 13th Special Mission Brigade with the task of "Decapitation Unit (참수부대)" for Supreme Leader of North Korea - "Kim Jong Un" on 1 December 2017.

=== Order of battle ===
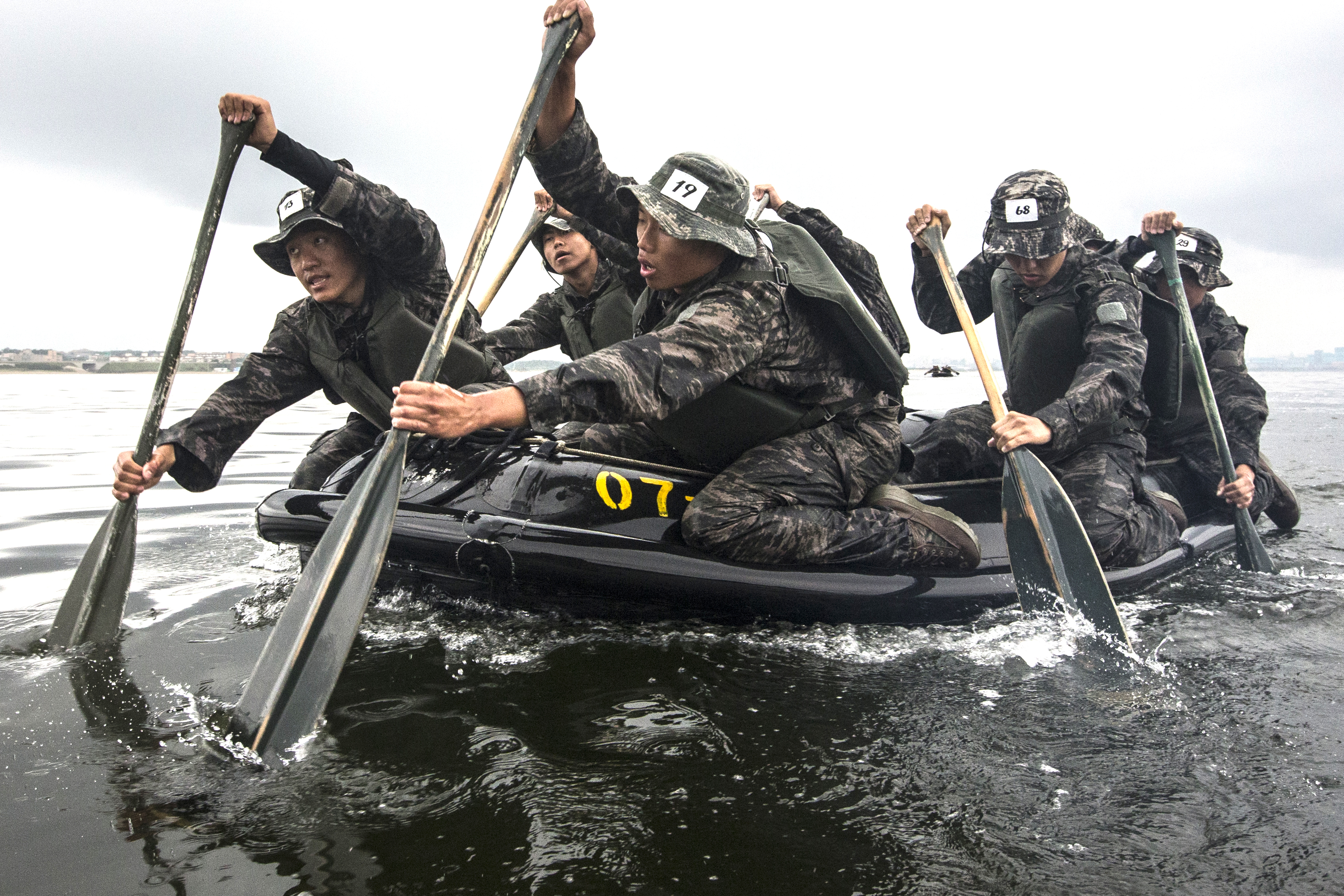
ROKMC Recon Trainees conducting Small-Unit IBS Amphibious Raid

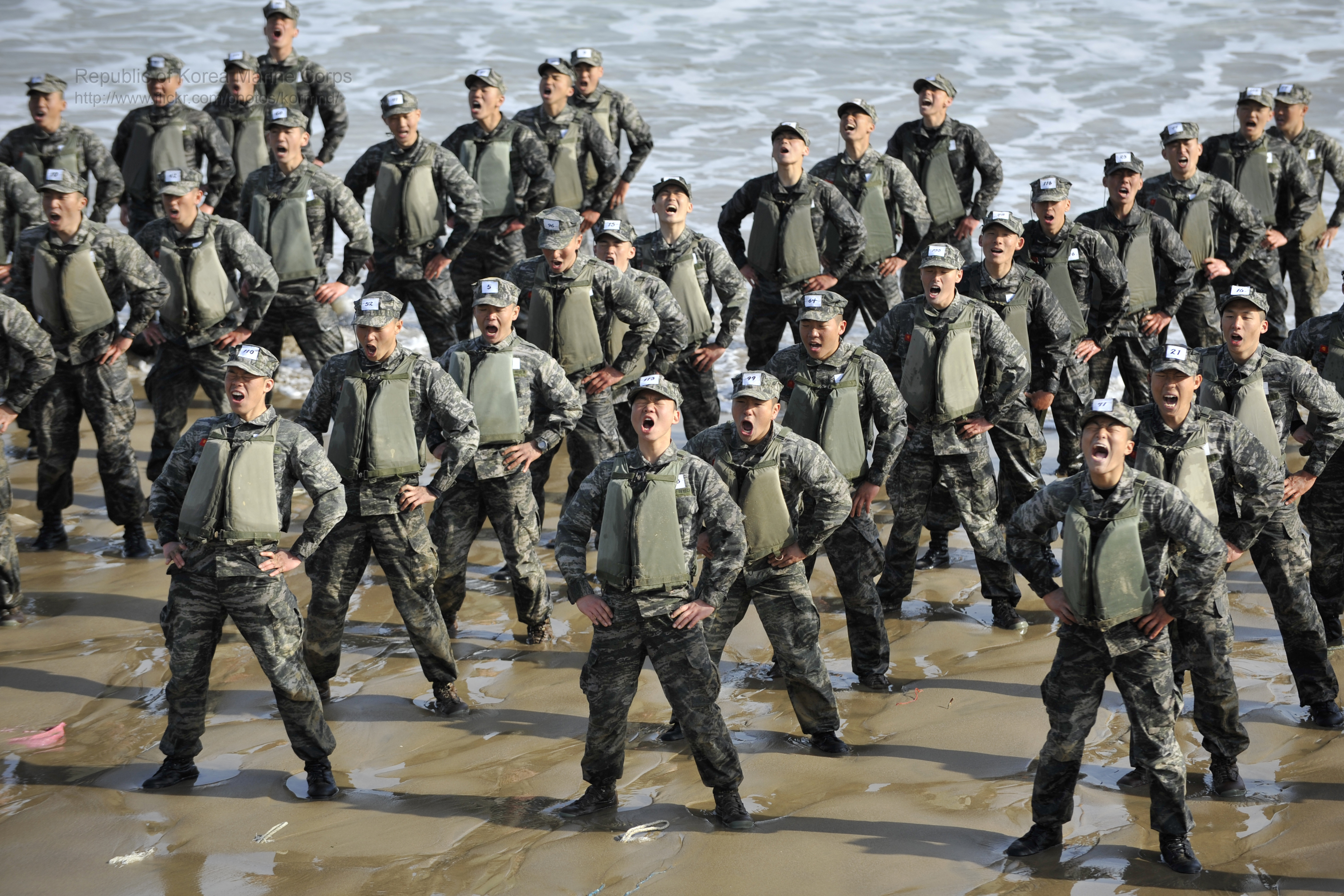
Marine Recon Trainees during Recon School (BRC)

- Republic of Korea Marine Corps Headquarters (대한민국 해병대사령부, ROKMC HQ)
    - Special Force Reconnaissance Battalion (특수수색대대) (Located in 1st ROKMARDIV)
    - Headquarters Battalion
    - Information and Communications Battalion
    - Military Police Command
    - Marine Corps Safety Command
    - Marine Corps Investigation Command
    - Combat Simulation Analysis Center
    - Cyber Operations Center
    - Sexual Harassment Prevention & Response Center
    - Leadership Center
    - Marine Corps Military Research Institute
  - 1st Marine Division (Sea-Dragons, 제1해병사단, 1st ROKMARDIV)
    - 1st Headquarters Battalion
    - Quick Maneuver Force
    - 2nd Marine Brigade (Yellow-Dragon)
      - 21st Marine Battalion (Airborne)
      - 22nd Marine Battalion (Amphibious Raid)
      - 23rd Marine Battalion (Ranger)
    - 3rd Marine Brigade (King-Kong)
      - 31st Marine Battalion (Airborne)
      - 32nd Marine Battalion (Amphibious Raid)
      - 33rd Marine Battalion (Ranger)
    - 7th Marine Brigade (Warthog)
      - 71st Marine Battalion (Ranger)
      - 72nd Marine Battalion (Amphibious Raid)
      - 73rd Marine Battalion (Airborne)
    - 1st Marine Artillery Brigade (Phoenix): equipped with K55/K9A1
      - 2nd Marine Artillery Battalion
      - 3rd Marine Artillery Battalion
      - 7th Marine Artillery Battalion
      - 11th Marine Artillery Battalion
    - 1st Reconnaissance Battalion
    - 1st Tank Battalion: equipped with K1 Main Battle Tank
    - 1st Amphibious Assault Vehicle Battalion: equipped with KAAV7A1
    - 1st Engineer Battalion
    - 1st Chemical, Biological, and Radiological Defense Battalion
    - 1st Intelligence Battalion
    - 1st Information and Communications Battalion
    - 1st Medical Battalion
    - 1st Support Battalion
    - 1st Military Police Company
    - 1st Low Altitude Air Defense Battery
    - 16th Reserve Forces Management Regiment
  - 2nd Marine Division (Blue-Dragons, 제2해병사단, 2nd ROKMARDIV)
    - 2nd Headquarters Battalion
    - 1st Marine Brigade
      - 11th Marine Battalion
      - 12th Marine Battalion
      - 13th Marine Battalion
    - 5th Marine Brigade
      - 51st Marine Battalion
      - 52nd Marine Battalion
      - 53rd Marine Battalion
    - 8th Marine Brigade
      - 81st Marine Battalion (Rhino)
      - 82nd Marine Battalion (Hornet)
      - 83rd Marine Battalion (Bat)
    - 2nd Marine Artillery Brigade: equipped with K55/K9 Thunder
      - 1st Marine Artillery Battalion
      - 5th Marine Artillery Battalion
      - 8th Marine Artillery Battalion
      - 22nd Marine Artillery Battalion
      - 2nd Low Altitude Air Defense Battery
    - 2nd Reconnaissance Battalion
    - 2nd Tank Battalion: equipped with K1 Main Battle Tank
    - 2nd Amphibious Assault Vehicle Battalion: equipped with KAAV7A1
    - 2nd Engineer Battalion
    - 2nd Chemical, Biological, and Radiological Defense Battalion
    - 2nd Information and Communications Battalion
    - 2nd Intelligence Battalion
    - 2nd Support Battalion
    - 2nd Medical Company
    - 2nd Military Police Company
    - 1st Reserve Forces Management Battalion
    - 2nd Reserve Forces Management Battalion
- North West Islands Defense Command (서북도서방위사령부, NWIDC)
  - 6th Marine Brigade (Black-Dragons, 제6해병여단, 6th BDE) on Baengnyeongdo island
    - 6th Headquarters Battalion
    - 61st Marine Battalion
      - Headquarters Company
      - 1st Company
      - 2nd Company
      - 3rd Company
      - Weapons Company
    - 62nd Marine Battalion
      - Headquarters Company
      - 5th Company
      - 6th Company
      - 7th Company
      - Weapons Company
    - 63rd Marine Battalion
      - Headquarters Company
      - 9th Company
      - 10th Company
      - Weapons Company
      - Tank Company
    - 65th Marine Battalion
      - Headquarters Company
      - 13th Company
      - 15th Company
      - 17th Company
      - Weapons Company
    - 6th Marine Artillery Battalion: equipped with K9 Thunder/K10 ARV
      - Headquarters Artillery Battery
      - Observation Artillery Battery
      - 1st Artillery Battery
      - 2nd Artillery Battery
      - 3rd Artillery Battery
      - 5th Artillery Battery
      - MLRS Battery
      - Guided Missiles Battery
    - 6th Marine Low Altitude Air Defense Battalion
      - Headquarters Company
      - 1st Low Altitude Air Defense Battery
      - 2nd Low Altitude Air Defense Battery
    - 6th Support Battalion
      - Headquarters Company
      - 6th Maintenance Company
      - 6th Supply & Transport Company
    - 6th Reconnaissance Company
    - 6th Engineer Company
    - 6th Chemical, Biological, and Radiological Defense Company
    - 6th Information and Communications Company
    - 6th Intelligence Company
    - 6th Medical Company
  - Yeon-Pyeong Unit (Bone-Dragons, 연평부대, YP-Unit) on Yeonpyeong island
    - Headquarters Company
    - 90th Marine Battalion
      - Headquarters Company (Black Lion)
      - 1st Company (White Tiger)
      - 2nd Company (Lighting)
      - 3rd Company (Phoenix)
      - Weapons Company (Eagle)
    - 9th Marine Artillery Battalion: equipped K9 Thunder/K10 ARV
      - Headquarters Company (Sea of Blood)
      - Observations Company (Eagle Eye)
      - 6th Artillery Company (Vanguard)
      - 7th Artillery Company (Biryong)
      - 8 Artillery Company (Black Turtle-Snake)
      - Guided Missiles Company
      - MLRS Company
    - U-do Garrison Unit
    - Engineer Company
    - Information and Communications Company
    - Intelligence Company
    - Logistics Support Company
    - Medical Company
    - Low Altitude Air Defense Battery
    - Tank Platoon
- 9th Marine Brigade (White-Dragons, 제9해병여단, 9th BDE) on Jeju island
  - Headquarters Battalion
  - 9th Rapid Response Battalion
  - 91st Marine Battalion
  - 92nd Marine Battalion
  - 93rd Marine Battalion
  - Military Police Company
    - Special Duty Team
  - Marine Artillery Company: equipped with K55/KH179
  - 9th Engineer Company
  - Information and Communications Company
- Marine Air Group (항공단) (MAG)
  - Headquarters Squadron
  - 1st Squadron
  - 2nd Squadron
  - Aviation Maintenance Squadron
  - Training Squadron
  - 2ROKMARDIV Detachment
- Marine Corps Logistics Support Group (군수단) (LSG)
  - Headquarters Company
  - Transport Battalion
  - Supply Battalion
  - Maintenance Battalion
  - Amphibious Support Battalion
  - Information and Communications Company
- Marine Corps Education and Training Group (교육훈련단) (ETG)
  - Education and Training Group Headquarters Battalion
  - 15th Marine Training Regiment
    - Officer Training Battalion
    - Non-Commissioned Officer Training Battalion
    - Recruit Training Battalion
      - 1st Recruit Training Company
      - 2nd Recruit Training Company
      - 3rd Recruit Training Company
      - 5th Recruit Training Company
    - Training Support Group
  - Amphibious Warfare Training Battalion
    - Reconnaissance & IBS (Inflatable Boat Small) Training Company
    - Airborne Training Company
    - Ranger Training Company
    - Supply/Logistics Training Company
    - Artillery/Mortars Training Battery
    - Information and Communications Training Company
    - Amphibious Assault Vehicles Training Company
    - Marksmanship Training Unit
  - Mobilization Support Group
    - 16× Mobilization Support Battalions

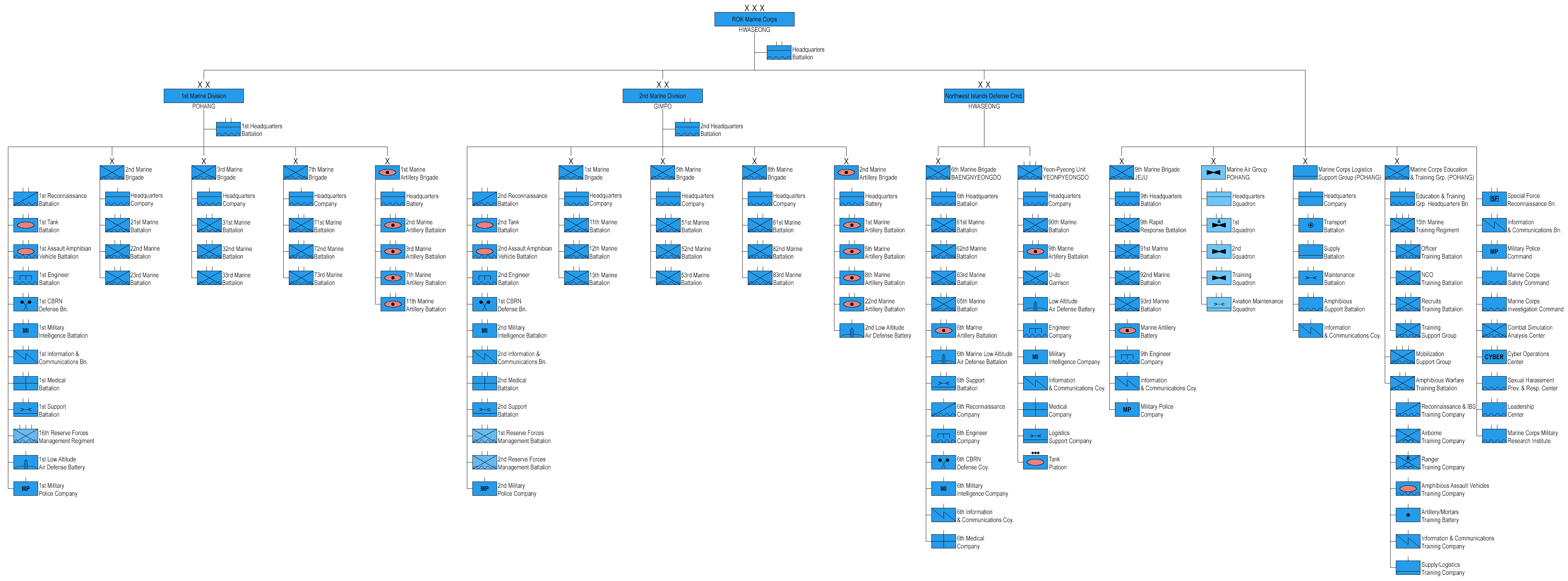
Republic of Korea Marine Corps organization 2025

== Personnel ==
=== Ranks ===
In the South Korean armed forces, ranks fall into one of four categories: commissioned officer, warrant officer, non-commissioned officer, and junior enlisted (Byeong), in decreasing order of authority.

- Commissioned officer

Commissioned officer ranks are subdivided into Jangseong-level (general) officers, Yeonggwan-level (field-grade) officers, and Wigwan-level (company-grade) officers.

Rank group	General officers				Field officers			Junior officers
Republic of Korea Marine Corps
Republic of Korea Marine Corps	대장; Daejang	중장; Jungjang	소장; Sojang	준장; Junjang	대령; Daeryeong	중령; Jungnyeong	소령; Soryeong	대위; Daewi	중위; Jungwi	소위; Sowi

- Warrant officer

All branches of the South Korean armed forces maintain a single Warrant Officer rank known as Junwi. Warrant Officers fall in between non-commissioned and commissioned officers. The rank is denoted by a gold-colored Sowi insignia.

Rank group	Warrant officer
Republic of Korea Marine Corps
Republic of Korea Marine Corps	준위; Junwi

- Enlisted

Every year about 12,000 new recruits are trained by the Marine Corps Education and Training Group at Pohang.

In the South Korean armed forces, personnel with ranks of Hasa through Wonsa are considered non-commissioned officers. There are enlisted ranks called "Corporal" and "Sergeant" in English, but they are not considered non-commissioned officer ranks, though they are treated as one if they hold an NCO position. Ideungbyeong (Korean: 이등병; Hanja: 2等兵), Ildeungbyeong (Korean: 일등병; Hanja: 1等兵), and Sangdeungbyeong (Korean: 상등병; Hanja: 上等兵) are commonly referred to as Ibyeong, Ilbyeong, and Sangbyeong respectively.

Rank group	Non-commissioned officer				Enlisted
Republic of Korea Marine Corps
Republic of Korea Marine Corps	원사; Wonsa	상사; Sangsa	중사; Jungsa	하사; Hasa	병장; Byeongjang	상등병; Sangdeungbyeong	일등병; Ildeungbyeong	이등병; Ideungbyeong

== Equipment ==
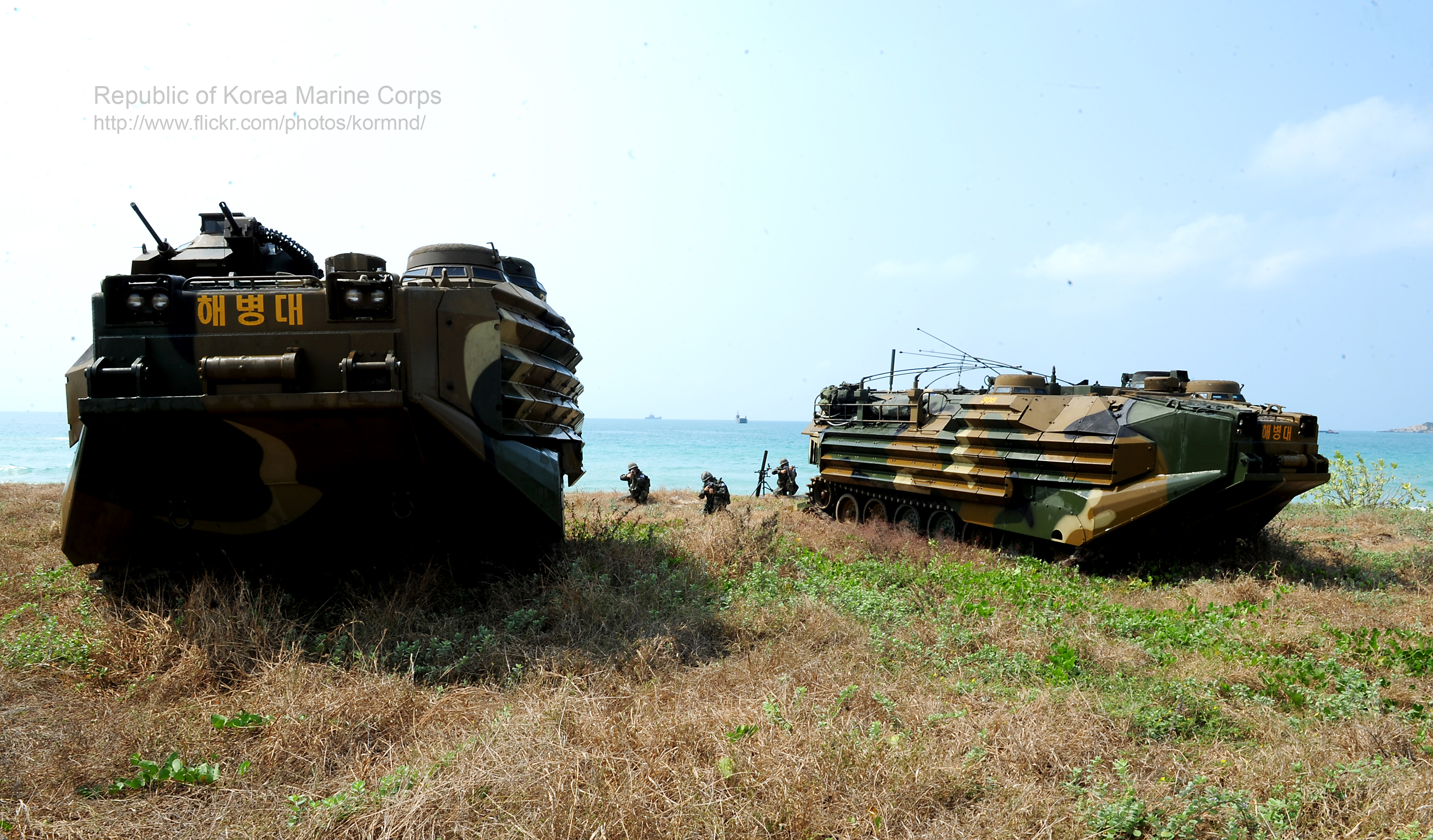
KAAV7A1 assault amphibious vehicles of the ROKMC at Cobra Gold 2014 in Thailand, with applique armor kits installed on the hull.

The ROKMC's acquisition plans are intrinsically tied to the ROK Army's procurement and focus on increasing tactical mobility, firepower, and command and control.

Until the mid-1990s, the ROKMC fleet of Amphibious Vehicles consisted of 61 Landing Vehicles Tracked (LVT) and 42 AAV7A1. In the early 1980s all amphibious tractors in ROKMC service were modified to LVTP7A1 standard, but the original variant remained for many more years in service. In an effort to replace the LVTs, the ROKMC undertook a 57 AAV7A1 co-production contract, later increased with an additional 67 AAV7A1 vehicles. Since 1998, South Korea had deployed these 124 new vehicles to enhance its defense against North Korea as well as replacing its current fleet consisting of obsolete vehicles.

The Marine Corps has no aircraft of its own, thus relying on aerial support from the Army and Navy. The service plans to create an aviation brigade with transport and KAI Surion attack helicopters by 2015. To strengthen its intelligence-gathering and surveillance capabilities, the service also is considering deploying unmanned aerial vehicles for reconnaissance.

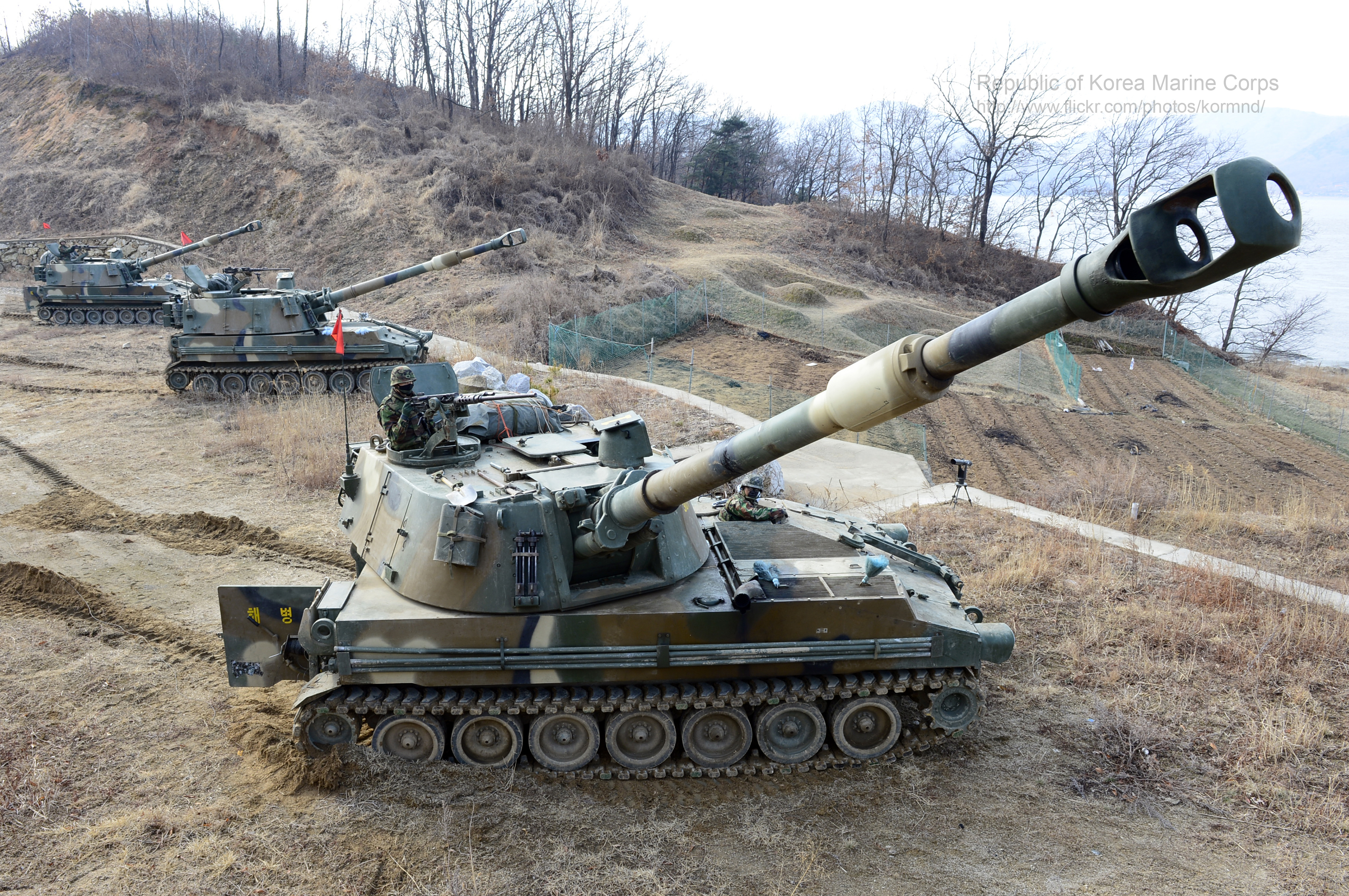
K-55 self-propelled howitzers of the ROKMC

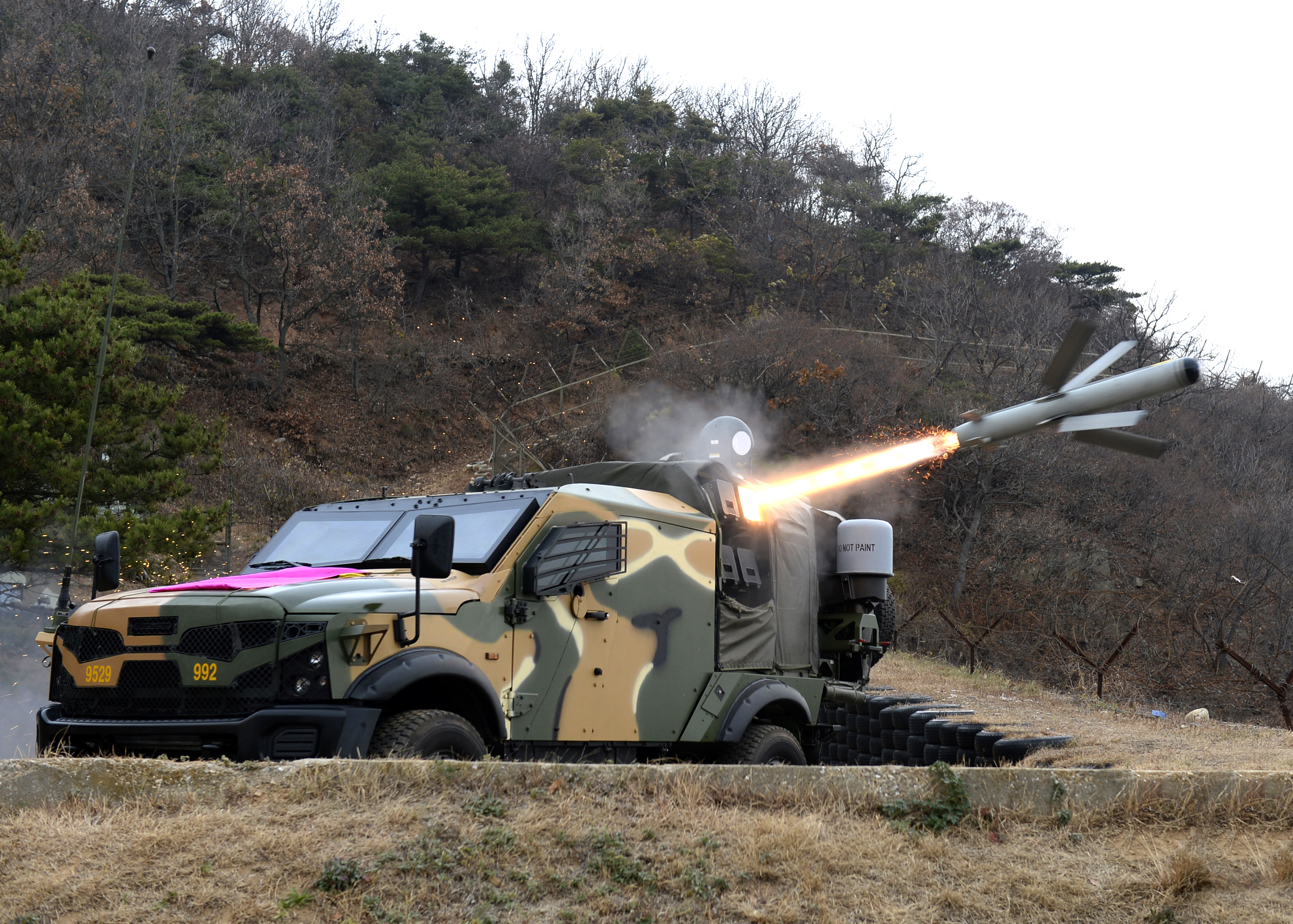
ROKMC Plasan Sand Cat fires a Spike NLOS in 2014

The former M48A3K Main Battle Tanks are fully replaced by around 50 to 60 K1 tanks. To support the force, K55, K9 Thunder self-propelled howitzers and KH179 towed howitzers are used.

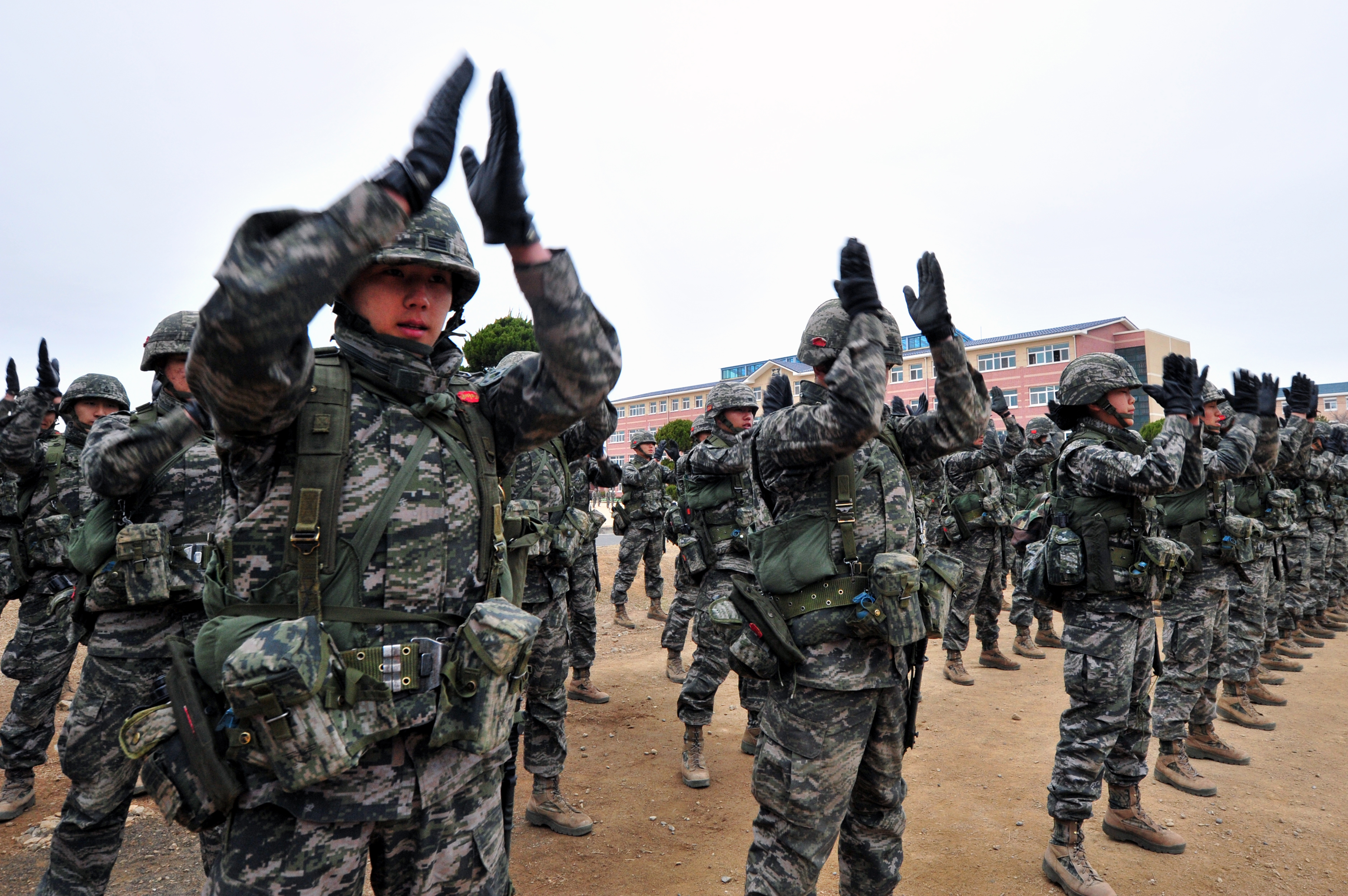
ROKMC Combat members are doing physical training with their camo pattern

The individual equipment may vary. The old ERDL type camouflage is still in use with training units, although it has been phased out largely by the ROKMC's new digital camouflage. The M-1956 load-carrying equipment, alongside large backpacks (similar to the ALICE backpacks) are still used, though most units now have been issued newer, updated LCE gear or combat vests and often also body-armor/plate-carriers and modern rucksacks with MOLLE webbing. The helmets in use are of the traditional steel-type (similar to the M1 and M80) and Kevlar helmets. Some units, such as Recon units, prefer the use of boonie hats.

In 2013, the ROKMC procured four Plasan Sandcat light protected vehicles with 67 Spike NLOS guided missiles.

By the end of 2017, ROK Marine Corps forces are to deploy the Bigung (flying arrow) guided rocket system near the Northern Limit Line (NLL) along the western sea border to protect the islands of Baengnyeong and Yeonpyeong from assault by North Korean hovercraft. The Bigung is a truck-mounted launcher that uses the LOGIR guided rocket, which is 2.75 in (70 mm) in diameter, 1.9 m (6.2 ft) long and weighs 15 kg (33 lb) with a range of 5–8 km (3.1–5.0 mi). Each system is capable of engaging multiple craft, with target acquisition and designation sights (TADS) and an uncooled infrared detector that can independently detect and track multiple targets simultaneously. Compared to coastal artillery, the system is more mobile and versatile, and can fire up to 36-40 rockets at once. The Agency for Defense Development partnered with LIG Nex1 for development and production.

=== Firearms ===
- Daewoo K1A Carbine, issued to tank/helicopter/vehicle crews, some elite-units use K1As with aftermarket handguards, rail-systems and sights.
- Daewoo K2/K2C1 Standard-issue assault rifle, often used in conjunction with the K201 40 mm grenade launcher, Picatinny RIS issued to all Reconnaissance units, top-mounted Picatinny rails being issued to all active units
- Daewoo K3 Standard-issue LMG
- Daewoo K5 Standard handgun, issued to tank/helicopter crews and high-ranking officers
- Daewoo K7 Silenced SMG in use with some special units
- Daewoo K14 Sniper rifle in use with Recon units
- Steyr SSG 69 Sniper rifle used by some elite units
- Accuracy International AWM Sniper rifle used by some elite units
- Colt M16A1 Assault rifle, license-produced by (Daewoo) S&T Precision, used by some training units alongside the K2
- M1 Garand Semi-automatic battle rifle, used by honor guard only

== See also ==
- Military of South Korea
