= Lee Sang-hun (footballer) =

South Korean footballer (born 1975)

Lee Sang-Hun 이상헌
Personal information
- Full name: Lee Sang-Hun
- Date of birth: October 11, 1975 (age 51)
- Place of birth: Incheon, South Korea
- Height: 1.85 m (6 ft 1 in)
- Position: Defender

Team information
- Current team: Singal High School

Youth career
- 1994–1997: Dongguk University

Senior career*
Years	Team	Apps	(Gls)
1998–2003	Anyang LG Cheetahs	55	(1)
2004–2006	Incheon United	35	(3)
2009	Yongin Citizen		

International career^{‡}
1995–1996	South Korea U-23	12	(1)
1997–2003	South Korea	17	(0)

Managerial career
- 2009–: Singal High School (Coach)
- * Club domestic league appearances and goals as of 28 April 2007 ‡ National team caps and goals as of 25 March 2007

Lee Sang-Hun (born October 11, 1975) is a South Korean football player.

He played mostly for FC Seoul, then knowns as Anyang LG Cheethas. He played for the South Korea national football team and was a participant at the 1998 FIFA World Cup.

== Club career statistics ==
Club performance			League		Cup		League Cup		Continental		Total	
Season	Club	League	Apps	Goals	Apps	Goals	Apps	Goals	Apps	Goals	Apps	Goals
South Korea			League		KFA Cup		League Cup		Asia		Total	
1998	Anyang LG Cheetahs	K-League	2	0	?	?	1	0	-			
1999	Anyang LG Cheetahs	K-League	10	0	?	?	9	0	?	?		
2000	Anyang LG Cheetahs	K-League	21	0	?	?	10	2	?	?		
2001	Anyang LG Cheetahs	K-League	1	0	?	?	0	0	?	?		
2002	Anyang LG Cheetahs	K-League	1	0	?	?	0	0	?	?		
2003	Anyang LG Cheetahs	K-League	20	1	1	0	-		-		21	1
2004	Incheon United	K-League	17	1	1	0	3	0	-		21	1
2005	Incheon United	K-League	8	1	0	0	0	0	-		8	1
2006	Incheon United	K-League	10	1	1	0	1	0	-		12	1
Total	South Korea		90	4			24	2				
Career total			90	4			24	2				

Sporting positions
Preceded by Kim Gwi-Hwa	Anyang LG Cheetahs captain 2001–2001.05	Succeeded by Son Hyun-Jun
