= Lee Sang-hoon (general) =

Republic of Korea Marine Corps officer (born 1959)

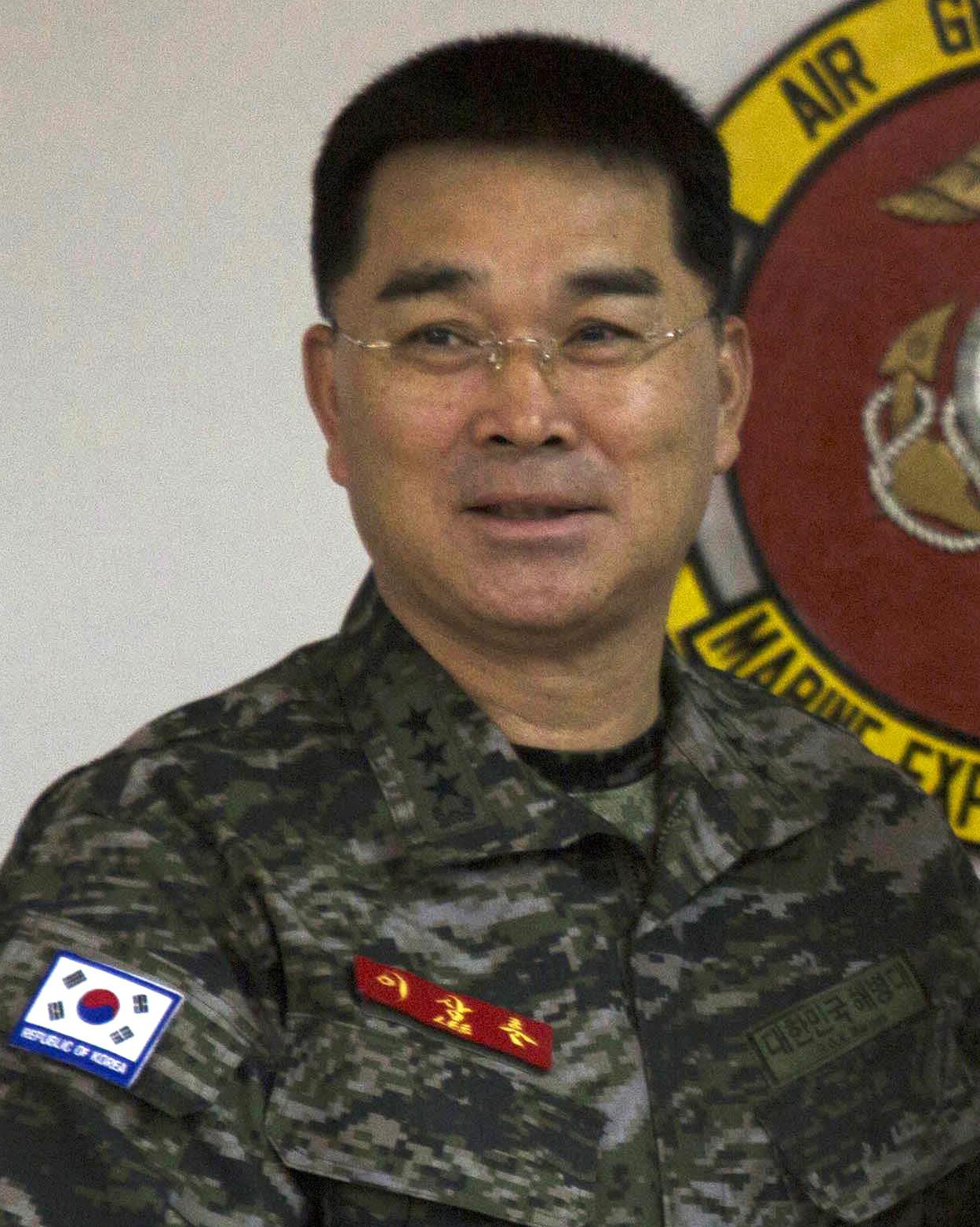

Lee Sang-hoon (Korean: 이상훈; born 1959) is a Republic of Korea Marine Corps officer who served as the Commandant of the Corps from 2015 April 13 to 2017 April 13.

He is a 1982 graduate of the Republic of Korea Naval Academy and attained a master's degree in government from the University of Suwon in 2001.
