= List of South Korean women artists =

Yong-joo Choi (-Marbot) (active since 1987), Western & Oriental Painter

This is a list of women artists who were born in South Korea or whose artworks are closely associated with that country.

== A ==
- Jun Ahn (active since 2006), fine arts photographer

== B ==
- Bang Hai Ja (1937–2022), abstract painter, stained-glass artist and calligrapher
- Lee Bul (born 1964), installation artist

== C ==
- Mina Cheon (born 1973), new media artist
- Young-ja Cho (born 1951), sculptor
- Jung Hee Choi (active since 1999), artist, musician, based in New York
- Choi Kyung-ah (born 1969), manhwa artist
- Kyung-hwa Choi-ahoi (born 1967), graphic artist and academic based in Hamburg
- Chunghi Choo (born 1938), jewellery designer, metalsmith

== G ==
- Goh Gyong-Sook (born 1972), children's writer and illustrator

== H ==
- Kyungah Ham (born 1966), multimedia artist
- Young Gi Han (born 1984), contemporary artist
- Kyung-hee Hong (born 1954), sculptor
- Ran Hwang (born 1960), mixed media artist working with buttons, pins and thread
- Hyewon Yum (born 1976), children's book writer and illustrator

== K ==
- Kang Kyung-ok (born 1965), manhwa artist
- Kim Yik-yung (born 1935), ceramist
- Kimsooja (born 1957), multidisciplinary artist
- Koo Jeong-a (born 1967), installation artist
- Kyung Hye-won (born 1981), children's book author, illustrator

== L ==
- Lee Bul (born 1964), sculptor, installation artist
- Chang-Jin Lee, visual artist
- JeeYoung Lee (born 1983), contemporary artist
- Lee Hyeon-sook (born 1971), manhwa artist
- Lee Myung-ae (born 1976), children's book writer and illustrator
- Lee So-young (artist) (born 1973), manhwa artist
- Lee Young-you (born 1977), manhwa artist
- Minouk Lim (born 1968), multimedia artist

== M ==
- massstar (active since 2014), webtoon artist
- Jiha Moon (born 1973), contemporary artist
- Moon Kyungwon (born 1969), painter, video artist
- Kang Myung-sun (born 1974), design artist working with mother-of-pearl

== N ==
- Na Hye-sok (1896–1948), painter, writer
- Noh In-kyung (born 1980), children's book writer and illustrator

== P ==
- Park Naehyeon (1920–1976), painter

== R ==
- Seund Ja Rhee (1918–2009), painter, printmaker, ceramist
- Jewyo Rhii (born 1971), artist, writer
- Rhim Ju-yeon (born 1976), manhwa artist

== S ==
- Shin Saimdang (1504–1551) writer, painter, calligraphist
- SEO (artist) (born 1977), painter, based in Berlin
- Sanghee Song (born 1970), animator, video artist

== W ==
- Won Soo-yeon (born 1961), manhwa artist

== Y ==
- Haegue Yang (born 1971), artist working with household objects
- Niki Yang (active since 2008), animator, voice actress
- Yoon Kang-mi (1965), illustrator
- Younhee Yang (born 1977), painter
- Anicka Yi (born 1971), conceptual artist working with fragrances
- Taeeun Yoo (fl 2000s), children's book writer and illustrator
- Jayoung Yoon (born 1979), visual artist
- Yoon Mi-sook (born 1969), illustrator
- Yun Mi-kyung (born 1980), manhwa artist
