= Miss Trot =

South Korean television series

- Promotional poster for Season 1
- Hangul: 내일은 미스트롯
- Lit.: Tomorrow Is Miss Trot
- RR: Naeireun Miseu Teurot
- MR: Naeirŭn Misŭ T'ŭrot
- Presented by: Kim Sung-joo
- Opening theme: Season 1: Amor Fati (Kim Yeon-ja); Season 2: Girl Next Door (Jang Yoon-jeong)
- Ending theme: Season 1: Amor Fati (Kim Yeon-ja); Season 2: Girl Next Door (Jang Yoon-jeong)
- Country of origin: South Korea
- Original language: Korean
- No. of seasons: 2
- No. of episodes: 22 + 5 specials

Production
- Production location: South Korea
- Running time: 160 minutes per episode
- Production company: Golden Eight Media

Original release
- Network: TV Chosun
- Release: February 28, 2019 – March 4, 2021

Miss Trot

Compilation album by Various artists
- Released: Miss Trot DEATH MATCH; March 30, 2019; Miss Trot DEATH MATCH II; April 5, 2019; Miss Trot LEGEND MISSION; April 19, 2019; Miss Trot LEGEND MISSION II; April 26, 2019; Miss Trot FINAL STAGE; May 3, 2019
- Length: 18:50 (Miss Trot DEATH MATCH); 10:13 (Miss Trot DEATH MATCH II); 19:28 (Miss Trot LEGEND MISSION); 24:21 (Miss Trot LEGEND MISSION II); 38:00 (Miss Trot FINAL STAGE)
- Language: Korean
- Label: Soribada

Miss Trot 2

Compilation album by Various artists
- Released: Miss Trot 2 Preliminary Best Part 1; December 18, 2020; Miss Trot 2 Preliminary Best Part 1; December 25, 2020; Miss Trot 2 Preliminary Best Part 1; January 1, 2021; Miss Trot 2 Team Mission Best; January 8, 2021; Miss Trot 2 Death Match Part 1; January 15, 2021; Miss Trot 2 Death Match Part 2; January 22, 2021; Miss Trot 2 Medley Team Mission Group; January 29, 2021; Miss Trot 2 Medley Team Mission Ace Match; February 5, 2021; Miss Trot 2 Legendary Mission Best Semi-Final 1; February 12, 2021; Miss Trot 2 Legendary Mission Best Semi-Final 2; February 19, 2021; Miss Trot 2 Final Songwriter Mission; February 26, 2021
- Length: 23:31 (Miss Trot Preliminary Best Part 1); 19:38 (Miss Trot Preliminary Best Part 2); 10:53 (Miss Trot Preliminary Best Part 3); 34:19 (Miss Trot 2 Team Mission Best); 46:02(Miss Trot 2 Death Match Part 1); 44:36(Miss Trot 2 Death Match Part 2); 52:21(Miss Trot 2 Medley Team Mission Group); 22:22(Miss Trot 2 Medley Team Mission Ace Match); 33:01(Miss Trot 2 Legendary Mission Best Semi-Final 1); 40:15(Miss Trot 2 Legendary Mission Best Semi-Final 2); 24:33(Miss Trot 2 Final Songwriter Mission)
- Language: Korean
- Label: Kakao M

Miss Trot (Korean: 내일은 미스트롯) is a South Korean reality television show. It was aired on TV Chosun every Thursday starting from February 28 and ended on June 1, 2019.

The show had a male version spin-off, Mr Trot, premiered on January 2, 2020.

The second season of Miss Trot premiered on December 17, 2020 and ended on March 3, 2021.

The third season of Miss Trot premiered on December 21, 2023. However, unlike the previous seasons, there will only be 72 contestants competing in the preliminary round and the competition format had also been revamped to make it more competitive.

== Synopsis ==
Miss Trot is a trot audition program where 100 female contestants compete. The winner wins a prize money and also a chance to record a single. In every episode, twelve music masters act as judges.

== Main host ==
=== Season 1 and 2 ===
- Kim Sung-joo

== Masters ==
=== Season 1 ===
- Jang Yoon-jeong
- Noh Sa-yeon
- Cho Yeong-soo
- Lee Moo-song
- Park Myeong-su
- Jang Young-ran
- Shin Ji
- Kim Jong-min
- Boom
- Woohyun (Infinite)
- Kim So-hee
- Kim Yeon-ja
- Christian Burgos

=== Season 2 ===
- Jang Yoon-jeong
- Cho Yeong-soo
- Jin Sung
- Shin Ji
- Boom
- Kim Jun-su
- Jang Yong-ran
- Park Sun-joo
- Son Jun-ho
- Lim Young-woong
- Jang Minho
- Young Tak
- Lee Chan-won
- Kim Hee-jae (singer)
- Jeong Dong-won
- Kim Young-ok
- Kim Yong-im

=== Season 3 ===
- Jang Yoon-jeong
- Kim Yeon-woo
- Kolleen Park
- Jin Sung
- Boom
- Jang Minho
- Tsuki (Billlie)
- Hwang Bo-ra
- Eunhyuk (Super Junior)
- A.Coma (Note: Though there is 2 judges in this group, however they will only represent one heart. Only if the both of them agreed to press the heart, the heart will then lighted up)
- Ahn Sung-hoon
- Park Ji-hyeon

== Changes in time slot ==
Season	Air Date	Air Time (KST)	Running Time	Episode(s)
1	Air on Every Thursday			
1	28/2/2019 – 2/5/2019	22.00 – 00.40	160 Minutes	1–10
1	9/5/2019 – 16/5/2019	22.00 – 00.00	120 Minutes	11–12
1	Air on Every Saturday			
1	18/5/2019 – 1/6/2019	22.00 – 00.30	150 Minutes	13–15
2	Air on Every Thursday			
2	17/12/2020 – 3/3/2021	22.00 – 00.30	150 Minutes	1–present

== Contestants ==
=== Season 1 ===
Season 1

Initial Groups 1-5
Group Name	대학부	현역부A	현역부B	고등부A	직장부A
Group Entrance Order	1	2	3	4	5
Contestant Names (Hangul)	Kang Seung-yeon (강승연)	Jang Seo-young (장서영)	Han Ga-bin (한가빈)	Park Min-yi (박민이)	Gong So-won (공소원)
Contestant Names (Hangul)	Ahn Yoon-jin (안윤진)	Sook Haeng (숙행) (Note: Sook Haeng appeared as a challenger on Season 1, Episode 10 (Baek Jiyoung's Episode) and Season 4, Episode 6 (So Chan-Whee's Episode) of Hidden Singer.)	Kim Yang (김양) (Note: Kim Yang had previously debuted as a trot singer in 2008 with the song 우지 마라 (Uljimara, trans Don't Cry).)	Noh Yoon-hee (노윤희)	Kim Bo-yeon (김보연)
Contestant Names (Hangul)	Lee Sa-sha (이사샤)	Yoyomi (요요미)	Second (세컨드) (Note: Eun-byul was previously active as a member of early 2000s girl group LUV.) [Hong Ye-na (홍예나), Jo Eun-byul (조은별), Rani (라니), & Eunpyo (은표)]	Kim Yu-bin (김유빈)	Kim So-yu (김소유)
Contestant Names (Hangul)	Hong Da-hyun (홍다현)	Han Dam-hee (한담희)	Naya (나야)	Yoo Esther (유에스터)	Pyun Hyun-young (편현영)
Contestant Names (Hangul)	Kang Ye-seul (강예슬)	Jiwoni (지원이) (Note: Jiwoni had previously debuted as a trot singer.)	Park Min-ju (박민주)	Kim Min-seo (김민서)	Kim Na-hee (김나희)
Contestant Names (Hangul)	Jung Da-kyung (정다경)	Kang Ja-min (강자민)	Kang Su-bin (강수빈)	Bang Seo-hyun (방서현) (Note: Bang Seo-hyun is the daughter of singer Mister Bang.)	Kim Jung-hwa (김정홤)
Contestant Names (Hangul)	Lee So-yoon (이소윤)	Hong Ja (홍자)	Kim Chu-ri (김추리)	Kang Hye-min (강혜민) (Note: Kang Hye-min is the granddaughter of trot singer Kang Min-ju.) * (Note: Because there are two contestants named Kang Hye-min, an asterisk (*) will be used to demarcate them. If an asterisk is present, it signifies that the contestant listed is from 고등부A. If no asterisk is present, it signifies that the contestant listed is from 직장부B.)	Nam Hee-jung (남희정)
Contestant Names (Hangul)	Ahn So-ye (안소예)	Soo Kyung-yi (수경이)	Han Yeo-reum (한여름)	Seo Ji-yeon (서지연)	Lee Go-woon (이고운)
Contestant Names (Hangul)	Yoo Min-ji (유민지)	Song Ga-in (송가인)	Seol Ha-soo (설하수)	Song Byul-yi (송별이)	Lee Seo-hyun (이서현)
Contestant Names (Hangul)	Seo Ji-hee (서지희)	Ha Eum (하음)	Jeon Min-kyung (전민경)	Song Byul-yi (송별이)	Lee Seo-hyun (이서현)

Initial Groups 6-10
Group Name	현역부C	걸그룹부	마미부	직장부B	고등부B
Group Entrance Order	6	7	8	9	10
Contestant Names (Hangul)	Shin Na-ra (신나라)	Jo Seo-eun (조서은)	Ha Yu-bi (하유비)	Kim Malk-eum (김맑음)	Woo Hyun-jung (우현정)
Contestant Names (Hangul)	Trot Girl (트롯걸) [Oh Soo-a (오수아), Kim Eun-yeong (김은영), Sin Eun-mi (신은미)]	DooRi (두리) (Note: DooRi is a member of girl group GBB.)	Ha Yu-bi (하유비)	Lee Chae-bi (이채비)	Lee Seung-yeon (이승연) (Note: Lee Seung-yeon appeared as a challenger on Season 5, Episode 7 (Hong Jin-young's Episode) of Hidden Singer.)
Contestant Names (Hangul)	I.Q. (아이큐)	Hyeme (혜미) (Note: Hyeme was a member of girl group Rania.)	Sung Hae-ri (성해리)	Park Ga-eun (박가은)	Choi Yoon-young (최윤영)
Contestant Names (Hangul)	Baek Soo-jung (백수정)	Hwang In-sun (황인선) (Note: Hwang In-sun is a former member of girl group Smile.G. She also appeared on the first season of Produce 101, where she placed 27th.)	Sung Hae-ri (성해리)	Ma Jeong-mi (마정미)	Park Jin-ju and Park Geum-ju (박진주 & 박금주)
Contestant Names (Hangul)	Yoo Cho-rong (유초롱)	Noh Yeon-soo (노연수)	Ahn So-mi (안소미)	Kim Eui-young (김의영)	Sung Min-ji (성민지)
Contestant Names (Hangul)	Jeon Sol-mi (전솔미)	Jang Ha-on (장하온)	Ahn So-mi (안소미)	Jo Hye-rin (조혜린)	Sung Min-ji (성민지)
Contestant Names (Hangul)	Geom Ji (검지)	Park Sung-yeon (박성연)	Kim Yoo-sun (김유선)	Anya Floris (안야 프로리스)	Kim Eun-bin (김은빈)
Contestant Names (Hangul)	Yoo Kyung (유경)	Jeon Ye-im (전예임)	Kim Yoo-sun (김유선)	Kim Hee-jin (김희진)	Um Jae-won (엄재원)
Contestant Names (Hangul)	Lee Chae-yoon (이채윤)	Park Ha-yi (박하이) (Note: Park Ha-yi appeared on the first season of Produce 101, where she placed 51st.)	Hong Yoo-jin (홍유진)	Kim Su-na (김수나)	Jang Ye-ju (장예주)
Contestant Names (Hangul)	Lee Chae-yoon (이채윤)	Hwang Yeon-kyung (황연경)	Hong Yoo-jin (홍유진)	Kang Hye-min (강혜민)	Jang Ye-ju (장예주)
Contestant Names (Hangul)	Lee Chae-yoon (이채윤)	Lee Ji-won (이지원)	Jung Mi-ae (정미애) (Note: Jung Mi-ae appeared as a challenger on Season 3, Episode 1 (Lee Sun-hee's Episode) of Hidden Singer.)	Moon Ji-hyun (문지현)	Jang Ye-ju (장예주)
Contestant Names (Hangul)	Lee Chae-yoon (이채윤)	Hana (한아)	Jung Mi-ae (정미애)	Moon Ji-hyun (문지현)	Jang Ye-ju (장예주)

=== Season 2 ===
Season 2

Group Name	직장부A	Idol Group Category (아이돌부)	Kid Category (초등부)	Twin Category (쌍둥이부)	왕년부	Other Genre Category (타장르부)	직장부B
Group Entrance Order							
Contestant Names (Hangul)	Han Cho-im (한초임)	Taeha (태하) (Note: Taeha is a former member of girl group Momoland.)	Hwang Seung-ah (황승아)	Sisters (누이들)	Chae Eun-jung (채은정)	Oh Seo-young (오서영)	Kim Soo-yeon (김수연)
Contestant Names (Hangul)	Han Cho-im (한초임)	Huh Chan-mi (허찬미)	Kim Tae-yeon (김태연)	Sisters (누이들)	Oh Seung-eun (오승은)	Oh Seo-young (오서영)	Kim Soo-yeon (김수연)
Contestant Names (Hangul)	Rooney Kim (뤼니 킴)	Sorn (손)	Lim Seo Won (임서원)	Twin Girls (트윈걸스)	Kim Yeon-ji (김연지)	Song Ha-yea (송하예)	Kang Yae-bin (강예빈)
Contestant Names (Hangul)	Rooney Kim (뤼니 킴)	Sorn (손)	Kim Ji-yool (김지율)	Twin Girls (트윈걸스)	Kim Seong-eun (김성은)	Song Ha-yea (송하예)	Kang Yae-bin (강예빈)
Contestant Names (Hangul)	Bubbly Dia (버블디아)	Kim Sa-eun (김사은)	Kim Soo-bin (김수빈)	Chan Mi Chan Song (찬미찬송)	Lee Jae-eun (이재은)	Bang Sae-ok (방세옥)	Lee Hee-min (이희민)
Contestant Names (Hangul)	Bubbly Dia (버블디아)	Kim Sa-eun (김사은)	Kim Soo-bin (김수빈)	Chan Mi Chan Song (찬미찬송)	Navi (나비)	Bang Sae-ok (방세옥)	Lee Hee-min (이희민)
Contestant Names (Hangul)	Choi Seul-hwa (최설화)	Hong Ji-yoon (홍지윤)	Kim Da-hyun (김다현)	Artwins (아트윈스)	Kim Hyun-jung (김현정)	Eun Ga-eun (은가은)	Lee Hee-min (이희민)
Contestant Names (Hangul)	Choi Seul-hwa (최설화)	Hong Ji-yoon (홍지윤)	Kim Da-hyun (김다현)	Artwins (아트윈스)	Young Ji (영지)	Eun Ga-eun (은가은)	Kim Myeong-sun (김명선)
Contestant Names (Hangul)	Ha Seo-jung (하서정)	Hwang Woo-rim (황우림) (Note: Hwang Woo-rim is a member of girl group Playback.)	Lee So-won (이소원)	Miss Dong-yi (미스둥이)	Yoon Hee (윤희)	Choi Hyung-seon (최형선)	Kim Myeong-sun (김명선)
Contestant Names (Hangul)	Ha Seo-jung (하서정)	Hwang Woo-rim (황우림)	Lee So-won (이소원)	Miss Dong-yi (미스둥이)	Heo Yoon-ah (허윤아)	Choi Hyung-seon (최형선)	Kim Myeong-sun (김명선)

Group Name	Re-challenge Category (재도전부)	Working Category B (현역부B)	University Category (대학부)	Middle and High School Category (중고등부)	Working Category A (현역부A)	Mother Category (마미부)
Group Entrance Order						
Contestant Names (Hangul)	Kim So-yoo (김소유)	Kang Hye-yeon (강혜연) (Note: Kang Hye-yeon is a former member of girl groups EXID and Bestie.)	Oh Hee-sun (오희선)	Jeon Yoo-jin (전유진)	Soyumi (소유미) (Note: Soyumi is a former member of girl group Kiss&Cry.)	Park Seul-gi (박슬기) (Note: Park Seul-gi appeared as a challenger on Season 1, Episode 1 (Lena Park's Episode) of Hidden Singer.)
Contestant Names (Hangul)	Jang Ha-on (장하온)	Yoon Tae-hwa (윤태화)	Oh Hee-sun (오희선)	Song Yoo-jin (송유진)	Jin Dal-rae (진달래)	Baek Jang-mi (백장미)
Contestant Names (Hangul)	Jang Ha-on (장하온)	Byul Sa-rang (별사랑)	Oh Hee-sun (오희선)	Lee Ye-eun (이예은)	Jang Tae-hee (장태희)	Ga Ya-song (가야송)
Contestant Names (Hangul)	Gong So-won (공소원)	Ha Yi-rang (하이량)	Maria (마리아) (Note: Maria appeared as a challenger on Season 6, Episode 11 (Kim Wan-sun's Episode) of Hidden Singer.)	Pastel Girls (파스텔걸스)	Jung Hae-jin (정해진)	Yang Ji-eun (양지은)
Contestant Names (Hangul)	Gong So-won (공소원)	Ha Yi-rang (하이량)	Maria (마리아)	Pastel Girls (파스텔걸스)	Kim Da-na (김다나) (Note: Kim Da-na appeared as a challenger on Season 6, Episode 10 (Jang Yoon-jeong's Episode) of Hidden Singer.)	Kang Yoo-jin (강유진) (Note: Kang Yoo-jin appeared as a challenger on Season 6, Episode 1 (Kim Yeon-ja's Episode) of Hidden Singer.)

=== Season 3 ===
Season 3

== Episodes ==
=== Season 1 ===
Season 1

==== Episodes 1-3: Introduction and 100-Contestant Master Audition ====
Each contestant performs in front of a panel of 12 judges. Each judge is able to award the contestant a "heart", signified by lighting up a heart-shaped display next to their chair. If a contestant receives hearts from all 12 judges, she automatically advances in the competition. After all members in a group have performed, the judges deliberate, and decide if there are any contestants who did not receive 12 hearts who should still advance in the competition. All aired auditions are listed in the table below.

Bold = Contestant received all 12 hearts and advanced to the next round.

Italic = Contestant did not receive all 12 hearts, but was selected by the judges to advance to the next round.

Underline = Contestant's audition was not aired in full during the episode.

Episode 1: Audition Performances
Group	Performance Order	Contestant Name	Song Performed	Number of Hearts Awarded
대학부	1	Kang Ye-seul	Street of Love (사랑의 거리) _{[Orig. Moon Hee-ok]}	11
대학부	1	Kang Seung-yeon	Berry (찔레꽃) _{[Orig. Baek Nan-A]}	11
대학부	1	Ahn Yoon-jin	Island Village Teacher (섬마을 선생님) _{[Orig. Lee Mi-ja]}	8
대학부	1	**Jung Da-kyung**	I Like You (당신이 좋아) _{[Orig. Nam Jin & Jang Yun-jeong]}	12
대학부	1	**Lee So-yoon**	Night Fog (밤안개) _{[Orig. Hyun Mi]}	12
대학부	1	**Yoo Min-ji**	I Saw You Again (또 만났네요) _{[Orig. Joo Hyun-mi]}	12
고등부B	2	Um Jae-won	수덕사의 여승 _{[Orig. Song Choon-hee]}	7
고등부B	2	Choi Yoon-young	Love is Good (사랑이 좋아) _{[Orig. Hong Jin-young]}	7
고등부B	2	**Woo Hyun-jung**	Ring Ring (따르릉) _{[Orig. Hong Jin-young]}	12
고등부B	2	Park Jin-ju & Park Geum-ju	얼쑤 _{[Orig. Wink]}	8
고등부B	2	**Kim Eun-bin**	Love (사랑님) _{[Orig. Kim Yong-im]}	12
고등부B	2	Lee Seung-yeon	First Marriage (초혼) _{[Orig. Jang Yun-jeong]}	Unknown, not shown
고등부B	2	Sung Min-ji	Yes Sir (바로 내 남자) _{[Orig. Baek Soo-jung]}	Unknown, not shown
현역부B	3	Han Ga-bin	Chan, Chan, Chan! (찬찬찬) _{[Orig. Pyun Seung-yeob]}	11
현역부B	3	**Seol Ha-soo**	Love Twist (사랑의 트위스트) _{[Orig. Seol Woon-do]}	12
현역부B	3	Kim Chu-ri	Ignorance (무시로) _{[Orig. Na Hoon-a]}	11
현역부B	3	Second	Honey (자기야) + Pure (순정) + Unconditional (무조건) _{[Orig. Park Ju-hee, Koyote, Park Sang-chul]}	10
현역부B	3	**Kim Yang**	Ujimara (우지마라) _{[Orig. Kim Yang]}	12

Episode 2: Audition Performances
Group Name	Performance Order	Contestant Name	Song Performed	Number of Hearts Received
직장부B	4	Lee Chae-bi	Pretty Fox (예쁜 여우) _{[Orig. Kim Hye-yeon]}	11
직장부B	4	Anya Floris	Goodbye (잘가라) _{[Orig. Hong Jin-young]}	11
직장부B	4	**Kim Eui-young**	It Was Great (정말 좋았네) _{[Orig. Joo Hyun-mi]}	12
직장부B	4	**Kim Mal-keum**	Fishbone (어부바) _{[Orig. Jang Yun-jeong]}	12
직장부B	4	**Ma Jeong-mi**	Ujimara (우지마라) _{[Orig. Kim Yang]}	12
직장부B	4	**Kim Hee-jin**	A Pack (만원 한 장) _{[Orig. On Hee-jung]}	12
직장부B	4	**Kang Hye-min**	?	12
마미부	5	Kim Yoo-sun	A Late Regret (뒤늦은 후회) _{[Orig. Choi Jin-hee]}	11
마미부	5	**Ha Yu-bi**	Brother (오라버니) _{[Orig. Geum Jan-di]}	12
마미부	5	**Jung Mi-ae**	It Is Not (훨훨훨) _{[Orig. Kim Yong-im]}	12
마미부	5	Ahn So-mi**	Millenium Rock (천녀 바위) _{[Orig. Park Jung-sik]}	10
걸그룹부	6	Hyeme	No One (누구 없소) _{[Orig. Han Young-ae]}	11
걸그룹부	6	Park Ha-yi	About Romance (낭만에 대하여) _{[Orig. Choi Baek-ho]}	9
걸그룹부	6	Hwang In-sun	My Love (사랑아) _{[Orig. Jang Yun-jeong]}	9
걸그룹부	6	Park Sung-yeon	A Girl From Heuksan Island (흑산도 아가씨) _{[Orig. Lee Mi-ja]}	10
걸그룹부	6	Jang Ha-on	Manly (남자답게) _{[Orig. Ji Won-yi]}	11
걸그룹부	6	**DooRi**	The Princess (공주는 위로워) _{[Orig. Kim Ja-ok]}	12
걸그룹부	6	**Hana**	Springtime Goes (봄날은 간다) _{[Orig. Baek Seol-hee]}	12
현역부C	7	Baek Soo-jung	Yellow Shirt Man Linedance (노란 셔츠의 사나이) _{[Orig. Han Myeong-sook]}	8
현역부C	7	Shin Na-ra	Stop + (방그레 방그레) _{[Self-composed]}	7
현역부C	7	Lee Chae-yoon	Third (삼삼하게) _{[Self-composed]}	Unknown, not shown
현역부C	7	Jeon Sol-mi	A Touch of Love (사랑의 접촉사고) _{[Self-composed]}	Unknown, not shown
현역부C	7	Trot Girl	?	Unknown, not shown
현역부C	7	Yoo Kyung	Shin-sa-dong Person (신사동 그사람) _{[Self-composed]}	Unknown, not shown
현역부C	7	Yoo Cho-rong	Is There Nothing Like Me? (나 같은 건 없는 건가요) _{[Orig. Chu Ga-Yeol]}	Unknown, not shown
현역부C	7	Geom Ji	Jjan Jjan (짠 짠) _{[Self-composed]}	7

Episode 3: Audition Performances
Group Name	Performance Order	Contestant Name	Song Performed	Number of Hearts Received
고등부A	8	**Song Byul-yi**	Crush (짝사랑) _{[Orig. Joo Hyun-mi]}	12
고등부A	8	Bang Seo-hyun	Hot Love (뜨거운 사랑) _{[Orig. Mr Bang]}	9
고등부A	8	Park Min-i **	I Am 17 Years Old (나는 열일곱 살이예요) _{[Orig. New Canary (신카나리아)]}	7
고등부A	8	**Kang Hye-min**	Hoelyongpo (회룡포) _{[Orig. Kang Min-ju]}	12
직장부A	9	Gong So-won	(낭만에 대하여) _{[Orig. Choi Baek-ho]}	11
직장부A	9	Kim Na-hee	First Love (첫사랑) _{[Orig. Jang Yun-jeong]}	11
직장부A	9	**Kim So-yoo**	(신사랑 고개) _{[Orig. Geum Jan-di]}	12
현역부A	10	**Song Ga-in**	(한 많은 대동강) _{[Orig. Son Min-ho]}	12
현역부A	10	Kang Ja-min	(서울 대전 대구 부산) _{[Orig. Kim Hye-yeon]}	
현역부A	10	Soo Kyung-yi	(따르릉 REMIX) _{[Orig. Jang Yun-jeong]}	
현역부A	10	Jang Seo-young	(그 겨울의 찻집) _{[Orig. Sim Soo-bong]}	12
현역부A	10	Hong Ja	(상사화) _{[Orig. Ahn Ye-eun]}	12
현역부A	10	Ji Won-yi	(남자답게) _{[Self-composed]}	11
현역부A	10	Sook Haeng	(솔로 + 하여가) _{[Orig. Jaena and Seo Taiji and Boys]}	11

==== Episodes 4-5: Death Match Mission 1: Group Mission ====
Episode 4: Group Performances
Group Name	Performance Order	Style of Trot	Contestant Names	Song Performed	Hearts Received (Out of 7)
현정이와 큐티뽕짝 [Team Leader: Woo Hyun-jung]	1	Dance Trot	Woo Hyun-jung; Kim Eun-bin; Lee Seung-yeon	Shy Shy (부끄부끄) _{[Orig. Wink]}	7
나희쓰 [Team Leader: Kim Na-hee]	2	Jeong-Tong Trot	Kim So-yu; Gong So-won; Kim Na-hee	(봉선화 연정) _{[Orig. Hyun Cheol]}	7
한아걸스 [Team Leader: Hana]	3	Jeong-Tong Trot	Duri*; Hana; Park Sung-yeon*; Jang Ha-on**	(갈무리) _{[Orig. Na Hoon-a]}	6
맘마미애 [Team Leader: Jung Mi-ae]	4	Semi Trot	Ha Yu-bi; Jung Mi-ae; Kim Yoo-sun; Ahn So-mi	(우연히) _{[Orig. Woo Yeon-yi]}	7
숙행쓰 [Team Leader: Sook Haeng]	5	Rock Trot	Jang Seo-young; Song Ga-in; Hong Ja; Han Dam-hee; Ji Won-yi; Sook Haeng	(황홀한 고백) _{[Orig. Yoon Soo-il]}	7
민지대 트로트학과 19학번 [Team Leader: Yoo Min-ji]	6	Old Trot	Jung Da-kyung*; Lee So-yoon; Yoo Min-ji; Kang Seung-yeon**; Kang Ye-seul*	(빨간 구두 아저씨) _{[Orig. Nam Il-hae]}	3
Episode 5: Group Performances
진희진진자라 [Team Leader: Kim Hee-jin]	7	Ballad Trot	Kang Hye-min; Ma Jeong-mi*; Kim Malk-eum; Kim Eui-young; Kim Hee-jin*	(갈색추억) _{[Orig. Han Hye-jin]}	5
민이언즈 [Team Leader: Park Min-yi]	8	Jeong-Tong Trot	Seo Ji-yeon; Song Byul-yi; Kang Hye-min; Park Min-yi	(안동역에서) _{[Orig. Jin Sung]}	2
하수의 무리수 [Team Leader: Seol Ha-soo]	9	Elegy Trot	Seol Ha-soo; Kim Yang*; Second; Han Ga-bin*	(동백아가씨) _{[Orig. Lee Mi-ja]}	6

– Team Received 7 Hearts

All Member's from team received 7 Hearts Advanced to Next Round

(*) Contestant chosen by the master to advance the next round (chosen after team performance)
(**) Contestant chosen by the master to advance the next round (chosen after ALL team perform)

===== Episode 5-6: Death Match Mission 2: 1 VS 1 =====
– Contestant won.
– Contestant lost.

Episode 5: 1 VS 1 Match
Contestants			Performance Order	Song Performed		Number of Hearts Received	
Lee Seung-yeon*	VS	Jung Da-kyung	1	(짠짜라) _{[Orig. Jang Yoon-jung]}	(열두줄) _{[Orig. Kim Yong-im]}	2	9
Kim Na-hee	VS	Kang Ye-seul*	2	(벤치) _{[Orig. Seo Ju-kyung]}	(러브레터) _{[Orig. Joo Hyun-mi]}	7	4
Sook Haeng	VS	Jang Ha-on*	3	(날 보러와요) _{[Orig. Bang Mi]}	(커피한 잔) _{[Orig. Pearl Sisters]}	7	4
Song Ga-in*	VS	Hong Ja	4	(용두산 엘레지) _{[Orig. Go Bong-san]}	(비나리) _{[Orig. Sim Soo-bong]}	8	3
Episode 6: 1 VS 1 Match
Ahn So-mi	VS	Ha Yu-bi	5	(황진이) _{[Orig. Park Sang-cheol]}	(소양강 처녀) _{[Orig. Kim Tae-hee]}	4	7
Kim Hee-jin	VS	Han Ga-bin*	6	(아모레미오) _{[Orig. Yoo-mi]}	(몇 미터 앞에 두고) _{[Orig. Kim Sang-bae]}	8	3
Gong So-won	VS	Kang Seung-yeon	7	(뜨거운 안녕) _{[Orig. Johnny Lee]}	(팔베개) _{[Orig. LPG]}	7	4
Kim Eun-bin	VS	Woo Hyun-jung	8	(눈물의 부르스) _{[Orig. Joo Hyun-mi]}	(날 봐 귀순) _{[Orig. Tae Seong]}	5	6
Han Dam-hee*	VS	DooRi	9	(보고싶은 얼굴) _{[Orig. Min Hae-kyung]}	(애가 타) _{[Orig. Jang Yun-jeong]}	5	6
Ji Won-yi	VS	Park Sung-yeon*	10	(보릿고개) _{[Orig. Jin Seong]}	(옆집누나) _{[Orig. Jang Yun-jeong]}	6	5
Kim So-yu	VS	Jang Seo-young	11	(오래오래 살아주세요) _{[Orig. Song Hyun-seop]}	The 2 Line Bridge (2차선 다리) _{[Orig. Cha Tae-hyun]}	7	4
Jung Mi-ae	VS	Kim Yang	12	(쓰리랑) _{[Orig. Yoo Ji-na]}	(잡초) _{[Orig. Na Hoon-a]}	6	5
Kim Yoo-sun	VS	Ma Jeong-mi	Not Shown	(연인의 길) _{[Orig. Patti Kim]}	(서울여자) _{[Orig. Kim Soo-hee]}		

Number of heart is received from 11 masters
winning contestant automatically goes to next round, and losing contestant became "elimination candidate"
*losing contestants chosen by the master to advance the next round

==== Episode 6-8: 3rd Mission ====
1st Round Group Match

Episode 6-7: Group Match
Group Name	Performance Order	Contestants	Song Performed	Score			Ranking
Group Name	Performance Order	Contestants	Song Performed	Master	Audience	Total	Ranking
트롯여친	1	Ha Yu-bi; Sook Haeng; Song Ga-in; Kim Hee-jin	(트로트 메들리) _{[Orig. Mi Sang]} (쓰러집니다) _{[Orig. Seo Ju-kyung]} Yes I am (나로 말할것 같으면) _{[Orig. Mamamoo]} You're Not My Style (봉숙이) _{[Orig. Rose Motel]}	854	461	1315	5
PX	2	Han Ga-bin; Han Dam-hee; Woo Hyun-jung; Jung Da-kyung	(질풍가도) _{[Orig. Yoo Jung-seok]} (한잔해) _{[Orig. Yang Gi]} Cheer Up (산다는 건) _{[Orig. Hong Jin-young]} (땡벌) _{[Orig. Kang Jin]}	885	440	1325	4
4공주와 포상휴가	3	Jang Ha-on; Duri; Kim So-yu; Gong So-won	(얄미운 사랑) _{[Orig. Kim Ji-ae]} (사랑의 초인종) _{[Orig. LPG]} (남자는 여자를 귀찮게 해) _{[Orig. Moon Ju-ran]} Gashina (가시나) _{[Orig. Sunmi]} Love Battery EDM.Ver (사랑의 배터리 EDM.Ver) _{[Orig. Hong Jin-young]}	939	437	1376	3
되지	4	Jung Mi-ae; Ma Jeong-mi; Kim Na-hee; Lee Seung-yeon	(정열의 꽃) _{[Orig. Kim Soo-hee]} (달타령) _{[Orig. Kim Bu-ja]} Shanghai Romance (샹하이 로맨스) _{[Orig. Orange Caramel]} Dear Mother (어머님께) _{[Orig. G.o.d]}	922	473	1395	1
미스뽕뽕사단	5	Hong Ja; Ji Won-yi; Kang Ye-seul; Park Sung-yeon	Up and Down (위아래) _{[Orig. EXID]} Wa (와) _{[Orig. Lee Jung-hyun]} I Will Show You (보여줄게) _{[Orig. Ailee]} Bomba _{[Orig. Jessy Matador]} (무조건) _{[Orig. Park Sang-Cheol]}	928	464	1392	2

2nd Round Group Match

Episode 7-8: Group Match
Group Name	Performance Order	Contestants	Song Performed	Score			Ranking
Group Name	Performance Order	Contestants	Song Performed	Master	Audience	Total	Ranking
되지	1	Kim Na-hee	(불나비) _{[Orig. Jang Yun-jeong]} Round and Round (빙글빙글) _{[Orig. Na-mi]}	926	384	1310	3
PX	2	Jung Da-kyung	The Love I Committed (내가 저지른 사랑) _{[Orig. Im Chang-jung]}	930	463	1393	2
4공주와 포상휴가	3	Jang Ha-on	Dalla Dalla (달라달라) _{[Orig. ITZY]} Oh My Goodness Remix (어머나 Remix) _{[Orig. Jang Yun-jeong]}	865	342	1207	5
트롯여친	4	Song Ga-in	Tears _{[Orig. So Chan-whee]}	957	467	1424	1
미스뽕뽕사단	5	Ji Won-yi	(첫잔) _{[Orig. Skylark]} (불티) _{[Orig. Jeon Yang-rok]}	909	384	1293	4

Final Result for 3rd Mission
Group Name	Score				Total	Ranking	Advanced Contestant	Eliminated Contestant
Group Name	Round 1		Round 2		Total	Ranking	Advanced Contestant	Eliminated Contestant
Group Name	Masters	Soldier	Masters	Soldier	Total	Ranking	Advanced Contestant	Eliminated Contestant
트롯여친	854	461	957	467	2739	1	Ha Yu-bi; Sook Haeng; Song Ga-in; Kim Hee-jin	None
PX	885	440	930	463	2718	2	Jung Da-kyung	Han Ga-bin; Han Dam-hee; Woo Hyun-jung
4공주와 포상휴가	939	437	865	342	2583	5	DooRi; Kim So-yu	Jang Ha-on; Gong So-won
되지	922	473	926	384	2705	3	Jung Mi-ae; Kim Na-hee	Ma Jeong-mi; Lee Seung-yeon
미스뽕뽕사단	928	464	909	384	2685	4	Hong Ja; Kang Ye-seul; Park Sung-yeon	Ji Won-yi

==== Episode 8-9: Semi-Finals Missions ====
1st Round Individual Match

Episode 8-9: Individual Match
Contestants	Performance Order	Song Performed	Score			
Contestants	Performance Order	Song Performed	Online	Master	Audience	Total
Kim So-yu	1	(십분 내로) _{[Orig. Kim Yeon-ja]}	200	613	282	1095
Kim Na-hee	2	(송인) _{[Orig. Jang Yun-jeong]}	270	616	235	1121
Park Sung-yeon	3	(마음이 고와야지) _{[Orig. Nam Jin]}	210	571	219	1000
Sook Haeng	4	(나야 나) _{[Orig. Nam Jin]}	250	614	225	1089
Kang Ye-seul	5	(트위스트) _{[Orig. Jang Yun-jeong]}	220	568	135	923
Song Ga-in	6	(영동 부르스) _{[Orig. Kim Yeon-ja]}	300	627	245	1172
Jung Da-kyung	7	(가슴 아프게) _{[Orig. Nam Jin]}	240	640	250	1130
Hong Ja	8	(사랑 참) _{[Orig. Jang Yun-jeong]}	290	653	246	1189
Duri	9	(밤 열차) _{[Orig. Kim Yeon-ja]}	280	599	227	1106
Ha Yu-bi	10	(블란서 영화처럼) _{[Orig. Jang Yun-jeong]}	230	601	198	1029
Kim Hee-jin	11	(빈 잔) _{[Orig. Nam Jin]}	190	613	244	1047
Jung Mi-ae	12	(수은등) _{[Orig. Kim Yeon-ja]}	260	658	278	1196

2nd Round 1 VS 1

Episode 9: 1 VS 1 Match
Contestants			Performance Order	Song Performed	Score			
Contestants			Performance Order	Song Performed	Hearts Received		Audience	
Jung Mi-ae	VS	DooRi	1	(천하장사 2013 ver) _{[Orig. Kim Yeon-ja]}	4	3	133	140
Kang Ye-seul	VS	Ha Yu-bi	2	(이따 이따요) _{[Orig. Jang Yun-jeong]}	6	1	207	89
Sook Haeng	VS	Jung Da-kyung	3	(미워도 다시한번) _{[Orig. Nam Jin]}	7	0	160	135
Hong Ja	VS	Kim Na-hee	4	(콩깍지) _{[Orig. Jang Yun-jeong]}	0	7	127	168
Park Sung-yeon	VS	Kim Hee-jin	5	(님과 함께) _{[Orig. Nam Jin]}	3	4	107	189
Song Ga-in	VS	Kim So-yu	6	(진정 인가요) _{[Orig. Kim Yeon-ja]}	5	2	204	92

Hearts Received From Masters but not affect total score

Final Result for 4th Mission
Contestants Name	Score				Total	Ranking
Contestants Name	Round 1			Round 2	Total	Ranking
Contestants Name	Online	Master	Audience	Audience	Total	Ranking
Song Ga-in	300	627	245	204	1376	1
Jung Mi-ae	260	658	278	133	1329	2
Hong Ja	290	653	246	127	1316	3
Kim Na-hee	270	616	235	168	1289	4
Jung Da-kyung	240	640	250	135	1265	5
Sook Haeng	250	614	225	160	1249	6
Duri	280	599	227	140	1246	7
Kim Hee-jin	190	613	244	189	1236	8
Kim So-yu	200	613	282	92	1187	9
Kang Ye-seul	220	568	135	207	1130	10
Ha Yu-bi	230	601	198	89	1118	11
Park Sung-yeon	210	571	219	107	1107	12

– Contestants advances to FINAL MISSIONS

==== Episode 10: Final Missions ====
1st Round: Composer Mission

Episode 10: Composer Mission
Contestants	Performance Order	Song Performed	Score			
Contestants	Performance Order	Song Performed	Master	Online	Audience	Total
Jung Da-kyung	1	(사랑의 신호등) _{[Composer Duble Sidekick]}	625	260	173	1058
Kim Na-hee	2	(까르보나라) _{[Composer Duble Sidekick]}	644	280	211	1135
Hong Ja	3	(여기요) _{[Composer Duble Sidekick]}	625	290	215	1130
Jung Mi-ae	4	(라밤바) _{[Composer Brave Brothers]}	642	270	237	1149
Song Ga-in	5	(무명배우) _{[Composer Yoon Myeong-seon]}	648	300	211	1159

===== 2nd Round: My Life Song Mission =====
Episode 10: My Life Song Mission
Contestants	Performance Order	Song Performed	Score		Total
Contestants	Performance Order	Song Performed	Masters	Audience	Total
Jung Da-kyung	1	(약손) _{[Orig. Song Dae-kwan, Jeon Yong-rang]}	660	242	902
Kim Na-hee	2	(곡예사의 첫 사랑) _{[Orig. Park Kyung-ae]}	643	175	818
Hong Ja	3	(열애) _{[Orig. Yoon Si-nae]}	645	195	840
Jung Mi-ae	4	(장녹수) _{[Orig. Jeon Mi-kyung]}	646	Not Shown	646(+)
Song Ga-in	5	(단장의 미아리 고개) _{[Orig. Lee Hae-yeon]}	659	Not Shown	659(+)

Final Result
Contestants	Score		Total	Ranking	Title
Contestants	Round 1	round 2	Total	Ranking	Title
Song Ga-in	1159	659(+)	1818(+)	1st	진(眞)
Jung Mi-ae	1149	646(+)	1795(+)	2nd	선(善)
Hong Ja	1130	840	1970	3rd	미(美)
Jung Da-kyung	1058	902	1960	4th	None
Kim Na-hee	1135	818	1953	5th	None

=== Season 2 ===
Season 2

==== Episodes 1-3: Introduction and 121-Contestant Master Audition ====
Each contestant performs in front of a panel of 17 judges. Each judge is able to award the contestant a "heart", signified by lighting up a heart-shaped display next to their chair.

If contestant received 15 hearts, they will automatically proceed to next round. In addition, if contestant received 9 to 14 hearts, they will be given a pass only. However, if contestant received less than 9 heart, they will be out immediately.

Episode 1-3: Audition Performances
Number of Hearts Awarded	Contestant Name
15	Maria, Hwang Seung-ah, Kim Tae-yeon, Kim Soo-bin, Kang Hye-yeon, Yoon Tae-hwa, Butterfly, Kim Hyun-jung, Kim Yeon-ji, Hong Ji-yoon, Huh Chan-mi, Sung Min-ji, Joo Mi, Park Joo-hee, Young Ji, Kim Eui-young, Jeon Yoo-jin, Twin Girls, Lee Bo-kyung, Kang Yoo-jin, Yang ji-eun, Kim Ji-yool
14	Lee Seung-yeon, Im Seo-won, Ha A-rang, Kim Sa-eun, Lee ye-eun, Eun Ga-eun, Jin Dal-rae, Kim Eun-bin, Byul Sa-rang
13	Hwang Woo-rim
12	Bang Soo-jung, Lee So-won, So Yoo-mi, Kim Myeong-sun, Han Cho-im, Park Seul-gi
11	Song Ha-ye, Jang Hyang-hee
10	Kim So-yoo, Jung Hae-jin, Yoon Hee, Song Yoo-jin, Lee Jae-eun
9	Bubbly Dia
8	Chae Eun-jung, Lee Hee-min
7	Sisters
5	Jung Eun-ju

== Ratings ==
Season 1

=== Season 1 ===
Miss Trot : South Korea viewers per episode (millions)

Season	Episode number										Average
Season	1	2	3	4	5	6	7	8	9	10	Average
1	1.053	1.398	1.356	1.490	1.778	2.129	2.457	2.594	2.760	3.653	2.067

Source: Audience measurement performed nationwide by Nielsen Media Research.

Average TV viewership ratings
Ep.	Original broadcast date	Average audience share (AGB Nielsen)	
Ep.	Original broadcast date	Nationwide	
Ep.	Original broadcast date	Part 1	Part 2
1	February 28, 2019	5.889%	5.731%
2	March 7, 2019	4.250%	3.653%
2	March 7, 2019	7.337%	6.977%
3	March 14, 2019	4.094%	4.067%
3	March 14, 2019	7.743%	7.849%
4	March 21, 2019	5.263%	5.114%
4	March 21, 2019	8.357%	8.250%
5	March 28, 2019	6.054%	5.783%
5	March 28, 2019	9.421%	8.526%
6	April 4, 2019	7.382%	7.364%
6	April 4, 2019	11.185%	11.007%
7	April 11, 2019	8.733%	8.069%
7	April 11, 2019	11.880%	11.547%
8	April 18, 2019	9.741%	9.513%
8	April 18, 2019	12.879%	12.308%
9	April 25, 2019	11.786%	10.617%
9	April 25, 2019	14.433%	13.499%
10	May 2, 2019	15.050%	14.080%
10	May 2, 2019	18.114%	17.756%
Average		9.452%	9.038%
Specials
11	May 9, 2019	7.544%	7.733%
12	May 16, 2019	10.118%	9.643%
13	May 18, 2019	4.131%	2.783%
14	May 25, 2019	3.448%	3.728%
15	June 1, 2019	2.689%	2.767%
In the table above, the blue numbers represent the lowest ratings and the red numbers represent the highest ratings.; Ratings do not include commercial time, which regular ratings usually do.

Season 2

=== Season 2 ===
Miss Trot 2 : South Korea viewers per episode (millions)

Season	Episode number												Average
Season	1	2	3	4	5	6	7	8	9	10	11	12	Average
2	5.826	5.938	5.720	5.506	6.335	5.719	5.932	6.277	5.910	6.301	6.720	6.670	6.071

Source: Audience measurement performed nationwide by Nielsen Media Research.

Average TV viewership ratings
Ep.	Original broadcast date	Average audience share (AGB Nielsen)					
Ep.	Original broadcast date	Nationwide			Seoul		
Ep.	Original broadcast date	Part 1	Part 2	Part 3	Part 1	Part 2	Part 3
1	December 17, 2020	25.497%	28.649%	—N/a	24.050%	27.302%	—N/a
2	December 24, 2020	24.925%	28.506%	—N/a	23.038%	26.482%	—N/a
3	December 31, 2020	24.192%	27.042%	22.314%	22.388%	24.937%	20.701%
4	January 7, 2021	26.145%	26.729%	—N/a	24.174%	24.384%	—N/a
5	January 14, 2021	26.205%	29.763%	—N/a	23.398%	26.834%	—N/a
6	January 21, 2021	26.095%	26.977%	—N/a	23.760%	24.892%	—N/a
7	January 28, 2021	26.796%	28.291%	—N/a	24.340%	26.133%	—N/a
8	February 4, 2021	27.653%	29.985%	—N/a	26.380%	28.321%	—N/a
9	February 11, 2021	23.871%	27.239%	—N/a	22.392%	26.288%	—N/a
10	February 18, 2021	28.678%	30.984%	—N/a	26.462%	29.574%	—N/a
11	February 25, 2021	29.674%	32.042%	—N/a	27.659%	30.191%	—N/a
12	March 4, 2021	30.037%	32.859%	—N/a	27.891%	30.691%	—N/a
In the table above, the blue numbers represent the lowest ratings and the red numbers represent the highest ratings.; Ratings do not include commercial time, which regular ratings usually do.

Season 3
