= Lee Ji-young =

Lee Ji-young may refer to:

- Lee Ji-young (field hockey) (born 1971), South Korean former field hockey player
- Lee Jee-young (born 1981), South Korean golfer
- JeeYoung Lee (born 1983), South Korean artist
- Lee Ji-young (baseball) (born 1986), South Korean baseball player
- Lee Ji-young (swimmer) (born 1989), South Korean swimmer
- Rhee Ji-yeong (fl. 2000s), South Korean voice actress
