= Yanghyun Prize =

Artist award in South Korea

- Hangul: 양현미술상
- Hanja: 洋賢美術賞
- Revised Romanization: Yanghyeon-misulsang
- McCune–Reischauer: Yanghyŏn-misulsang

The Yanghyun Prize is an annual award for artistic achievement. It was created in 2008 following the wishes of Sooho Cho who promoted various cultural activities with the ultimate goal of bringing Korean art to the world stage.

The Prize, awarded each year to an artist for his or her significant achievement, rewards a cash prize of KRW 100,000,000 (approximately $90,000) and a chance to showcase a full exhibition at one of the world's most renowned galleries or museums of the winner's choice within 3 years of receiving the prize.

== Prize Winners ==
The prize winners, known as laureates, were as follows:

- 2008: Cameron Jamie
- 2009: Isa Genzken
- 2010: Jewyo Rhii
- 2011: Akram Zaatari
- 2012: Abraham Cruzvillegas
- 2013: Rivane Neuenschwander
- 2014: Apichatpong Weerasethakul
- 2015: Otobong Nkanga
- 2016: Hito Steyerl
