= Yun-hui =

- Hangul: 윤희
- RR: Yunhui
- MR: Yunhŭi

Yun-hui, also spelled Yoon-hee or Yun-hee, is a Korean given name.

== People ==
People with this name include:

=== Entertainers ===
- Jeong Yun-hui (born 1954), South Korean actress
- Yu Ji-in (born Lee Yun-hui, 1956), South Korean actress
- Jo Yoon-hee (born 1982), South Korean actress
- Ri Yun-hui, North Korean drummer, member of Moranbong Band

=== Sportspeople ===
- Chang Yoon-hee (born 1970), South Korean volleyball player
- Choi Yun-hui (born 1967), South Korean swimmer
- Lee Yun-hui (born 1980), South Korean volleyball player
- Chung Yun-hee (born 1984), South Korean long-distance runner and marathon race specialist
- Seo Yoon-hee (born 1984), South Korean badminton player
- Choi Yun-hee (born 1986), South Korean pole vaulter
- Lee Yun-hui (rower) (born 1986), South Korean rower

=== Other ===
- Younhee Yang (born 1977), South Korean painter

== Fictional characters ==
Fictional characters with this name include:

- Kim Yoon-hee, in 2010 South Korean television series Sungkyunkwan Scandal
- Cha Yoon-hee, in 2012 South Korean television series My Husband Got a Family
- Seo Yoon-hee, in 2012 South Korean film The Tower
- Kim Yoon-hee, in 2012 South Korean television series Love Rain
- Oh Yoon-hee, in 2020 South Korean television series The Penthouse: War in Life

== See also ==
- List of Korean given names
