= Howard McCalebb =

American abstract sculptor (born 1947)

- Born: May 13, 1947 (age 79); Indianola, Mississippi
- Education: California State University, Hayward, Cornell University
- Known for: Sculpture

Howard McCalebb (born May 13, 1947, in Indianola, Mississippi) is an American abstract sculptor.

== Early life and education ==
He received his M.F.A. in sculpture from Cornell University in 1972, and his B.A. in sculpture from California State University, Hayward in 1970. In 1971, he participated in the Hobart School of Welding Technology, 5th Annual Sculpture Workshop in Troy, Ohio.

== Career ==
Howard McCalebb, Butterfly, 2008

McCalebb has taught fine art at San Jose State University in California; the University of Massachusetts Amherst and Amherst College; the University of North Carolina at Greensboro; Rutgers University in Newark, New Jersey; Hunter College, Cornell University, the Graduate School of Pratt Institute, and the Parsons School of Design, in New York City.

McCalebb's art has been exhibited internationally in Austria, Denmark, Germany, Hong Kong, Poland, and the United Arab Emirates. His art has been exhibited in numerous galleries and museums in the United States, including the San Francisco Museum of Modern Art and the San Jose Museum of Art in California; the Modern Art Museum of Fort Worth, Texas; and the Herbert F. Johnson Museum of Art, in Ithaca, New York; and The New Museum, Exit Art, Artist Space, Art in General, Socrates Sculpture Park, Sculpture Now, Inc., and The Studio Museum in Harlem in New York City.

Howard McCalebb, Conjoined Icon, 2005

In 1993 McCalebb was a featured artist in the film Manhattan City Scape, director by Steen Møller Rasmussen, a Plagiet Film, produced in cooperation with the Danish Film Institute Workshop. In 1981, he appeared in the film “Bearden Plays Bearden,” produced by the Philip Morris Corporation.

In 2000, McCalebb's sculpture was featured in the historic “Welded Sculpture of the Twentieth Century” exhibition at the Neuberger Museum of Art in Purchase, New York along with Julio González, Pablo Picasso, Anthony Caro, and David Smith.

In May 2001, he traveled to the People's Republic of China, and lectured at the China Academy of Art in Hangzhou.

In April 2003, McCalebb was one of the American artists representing the United States at the Sharjah Biennial, in the United Arab Emirates. He also lectured at the American University of Sharjah School of Architecture and Design.

In the summer of 2005, McCalebb he did a series of public sculpture projects in Balchik, Bulgaria; Borhaug, Norway; and Alytus, Lithuania.

In 2008 Howard McCalebb participated in the “Intrude: Art & Life 366” exhibition. organized by Shanghai Zendai Museum of Modern Art.

In 2009 Howard McCalebb founded the fine art gallery DadaPost Galerie in Berlin, Germany.

McCalebb is African-American.

== Publications ==
- 2009, Apoplexy: the Furor over Kara Walker, Essay in the book: Kara Walker No/ Kara Walker Yes/ Kara Walker ?
- 2012 Silent Pictures; The Paintings of Younhee Yang.
- 2013 Autobiography as Critique.
