= Kyung Hye-won =

South Korean author and illustrator

- Occupation: illustrator, picture book author
- Language: Korean
- Genre: Picture books

Kyung Hye-won (Korean: 경혜원) is a South Korean picture book author and illustrator. Her representative works include Elevator, Dinosaur X-Ray, Bigger Than You, I’m a Lion, and My Big, Secret Friend. She won the Taiwan Open Book Award in 2018 for Dinosaur X-Ray.

== Career ==
Kyung has worked as an illustrator since 2004, mainly providing illustrations for children's books. She published her first picture book, Special Friends, in 2014. Her representative works include Elevator, Dinosaur X-Ray, Bigger Than You, I’m a Lion, and My Big, Secret Friend. Since many of her picture books are dinosaur-themed, she is also known as a "dinosaur author" to children in Korea.

Her work with Dinosaur X-Ray won the Taiwan Open Book Award for Best Children's Book in 2018. Bigger than You (2018) was first published by HarperCollins, an American publisher, and then exported back to Korea.

== Works ==
- 2022 Me, the T-Rex, and Christmas (Munhakdongne)ISBN 9788954692496
- 2022 My Big, Secret Friend (Changbi)ISBN 9788936455934
- 2021 I'm a Lion (BIR)ISBN 9788949102566
- 2020 Thump, Thump (Sigong Junior)ISBN 9791165793760
  - 2022 冬冬 (Kanghao, Taiwan)ISBN 9786269606405
- 2020 The Candle Book (Woongjin Junior)ISBN 9788901245294
  - 2021 蟠燭書 (Kanghao, Taiwan)ISBN 9789869949552
- 2020 Go Back Inside the Egg! (Hanlim)ISBN 9788970940113
  - 2021 到你的劉壽負裡! (Kanghao, Taiwan)
- 2019 I'm Taller Than You! (BIR)ISBN 9788949105130
  - 2020 化你更高! (Kanghao, Taiwan)ISBN 9789869694179
  - 2020 Je suis plus grand que toi! (Rue du Monde, France)ISBN 9782355046315
- 2018 Bigger Than You (HarperCollins)ISBN 9780062683120
  - 2018 Bigger Than You (Hallim, Korea) from the USA original Bigger Than YouISBN 9788970945071
- 2017 Just One Bite (Hanlim)ISBN 9788970945750
  - 2018 給我吃一口! (Kanghao, Taiwan)ISBN 9789869501460
- 2017 Dinosaur X-Ray (Hanlim)ISBN 9788970949635
  - 2018 恐龍X光 (Kanghao, Taiwan)ISBN 9789869501484
  - 2020 L’hôpital des dinosaures (Éditions Versant Sud, Belgium)ISBN 9782930938165
  - 2020 ДИНОЗАВРЫ НА РЕНТТЕН! (Rosman, Russia)ISBN 9785353095873
  - 2024 きょうりゅうレントゲンびょういん (PIE International, Japan)ISBN 9784756258915
- 2016 Elevator (Sigong Junior)ISBN 9788952782588
  - 2016 Elevador (Océano Travesía, Mexico)ISBN 9786075277578
  - 2017 電梯 (Kanghao, Taiwan)ISBN 9789869501422
- 2014 Special Friends (Sigong Junior)ISBN 9788952780676
  - 2018 特別的朋友們 (Kanghao, Taiwan)ISBN 9789869501439

== Activities ==
- 2022 Participated in "Korean Picture Books: Fantasy in Everyday Life” seminar for Hong Kong primary and secondary school students at the Hong Kong Book Fair
- 2022 Participated in "Meet Author Kyung Hye-won" held at Mu Kuang English School in Kwun Tong, under the aegis of the Korean Cultural Center in Hong Kong
- 2022 Collaborated in the Mighty Wonders exhibition with ceramic artists
- 2017 53rd Group Exhibition at the Amway Museum of Art, Picture Books at the Museum (Exhibiting artists: Kyung Hye-won, Kim Myeong-seok, Lee Gi-hun, Lee Myung-ae, Lee Seok-gu, Jung Jinho)
