= Otobong Nkanga =

Nigerian artist (born 1974)

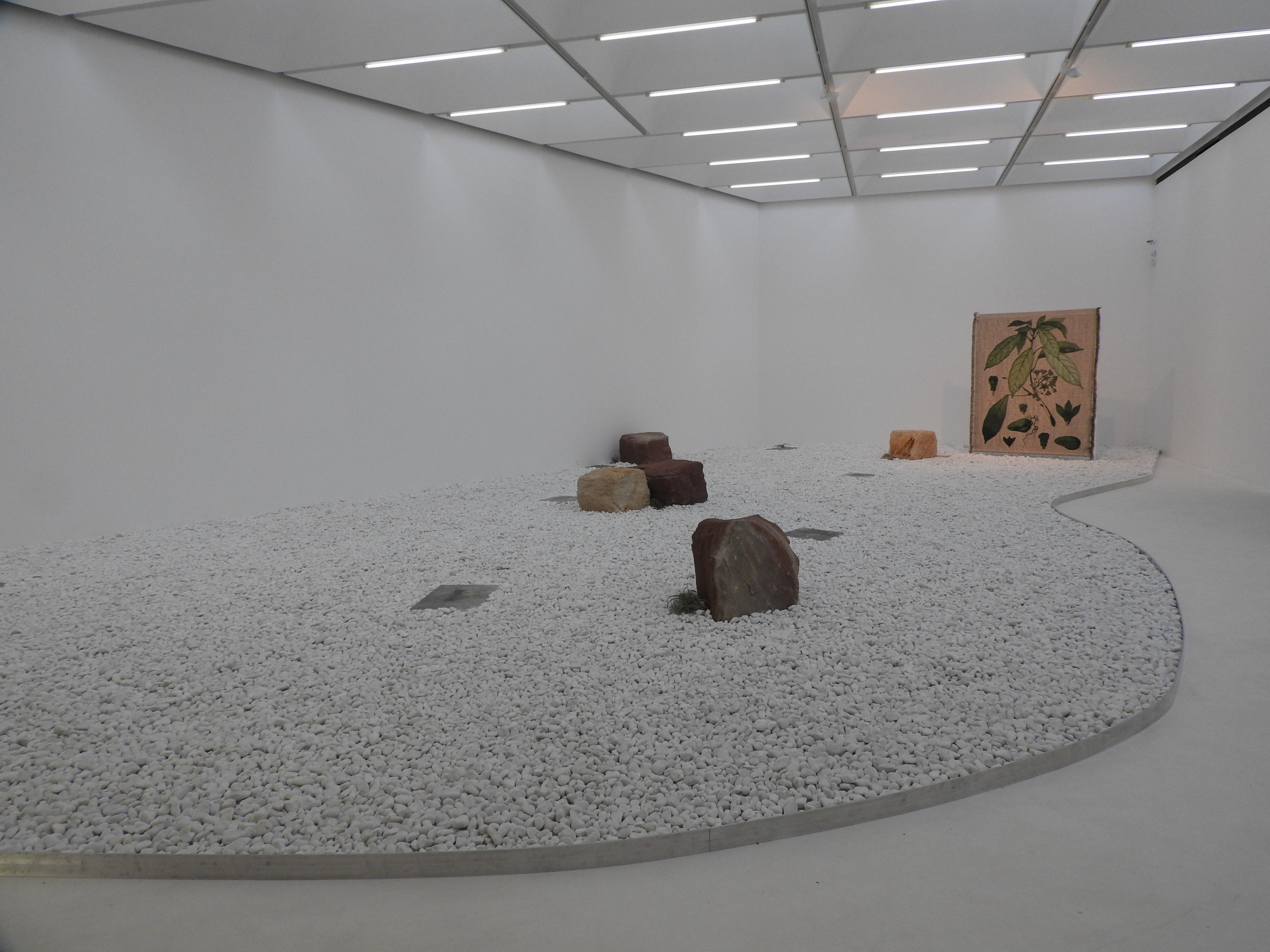
- Taste of a Stone. Ikǫ
- Born: 1974 (age 51–52); Kano, Nigeria
- Awards: Yanghyun Prize

Otobong Nkanga (born 1974) is a Nigerian-born visual artist, tapestry maker and performance artist, based in Antwerp, Belgium. In 2015, she won the Yanghyun Prize.

In her work she explores the social and topographical changes of her environment, observes their inherent complexities and understands how resources such as soil and earth, and their potential values, are subject to regional and cultural analysis. Her work has been featured in many institutions including the Tate Modern the KW Institute (Berlin), the Stedelijk Museum and the biennale of Sharjah. She also took part in the 20th Biennale of Sydney.

== Early life and education ==
Otobong Nkanga was born in Kano, Nigeria, in 1974 and spent the majority of her childhood in Lagos. Her interest in art and the environment developed during her childhood when she would collect minerals and draw images with mica on the pavements of Lagos. Her mother was a polytechnic teacher. Her father died when she was seven. Her mother then had to provide for Nkanga and her three siblings. During her teenage years her family relocated to Paris, France, due to her mother's work. Nkanga studied art at Obafemi Awolowo University in Ile-Ife and continued her studies at Ecole des Beaux-Arts in Paris. Her mother died in a car accident just when she started her university studies. She then went on to get a master's degree in Performing Arts at Dasarts, Amsterdam, in the Netherlands in 2008. She currently lives and works in Antwerp, Belgium.

== Work and career ==
=== Themes and materials ===
Throughout her work, Nkanga explore themes of neocolonialism, ecological violence, and environmental protection. For example, in The Weight of Scars she depicts the scars of mineral extraction. Also Nkanga's first US survey exhibition, To Dig a Hole That Collapses Again, sends a cautionary message about the world having an insatiable hunger for material resources and doing anything to obtain them. In Pursuit of Bling relays the same message by drawing attention to extractivism and the world's desire to obtain rare minerals and metals. In these ways, there is a site specificity to her work, as she states: "My work is interconnected with the places I've lived. What happens in one affects another. This is true for nature too."

Nkanga uses many forms of media such as drawings, photographs, painting, textiles, videos, and sculptures, however she is mostly known for her installations. As the writer and art critic Devon Van Houten Maldonado observes: "One foundation of her work involves breaking down and separating resources from the earth into piles, sculptures, and symbols – her focus is largely on the gross material." Some signature elements found in her art include "material emotionality," which is the idea that objects can feel, think, and remember; she uses this idea to communicate the experiences of natural materials in her installations. Body fragmentation – such as disembodied arms and legs – is another element that shows up in her works and it implies a lack of sense of a true whole. Using objects from ethnographic collections such as the Weltkulturen Museum in Frankfurt am Main, Nkanga explores, according to the artist, curator and writer Yvette Mutumba, "the relationship between the present context of the artefacts in the museum's Africa collection and their original cultural setting."

=== Career ===
Her first personal exhibition, Classicism & Beyond, took place in 2002 in the non-profit organization, Project Row Houses in Houston. In 2007 to 2008, in response to the work Baggage (1972 – 2007/2008) by American artist Allan Kaprow, Nkanga has designed a performance for the Kunsthalle Bern. The initial work that was based on issues of movement of goods from one point of the planet to another, Nkanga introduces a post-colonial dimension. As evidenced the artist in an interview, the concepts of identity, cultural specificities are again at the centre of her artistic gesture of re-appropriation.

Also, in 2008, the project Contained measures of Land used soil both as a symbol of the territory and competition and conflict. A year later, during her residence at Pointe-Noire, in the Congo, she has collected eight different colours of Earth. Pointe-Noire was colonized by the Portuguese and the French. Art critic Philippe Pirotte wrote that Nkanga comes to create a kind of vehicle for the presentation and the transportation which does not define the use value in an era where everyone is obsessed with the transformation of natural tools resources which serve humanity.

Her project, Contained Measures of Tangible Memories that started in 2010, from her first trip to the Morocco, she explores the practices of dyeing. She essentially transform objects in circulation to objets d'art.

In 2012, she has created a device for a performance, or rather an installation entitled Contained Measures of Kolanut with two photos, one of a tree called adekola and one with two girls imitating trees. Nkanga explained that the Kola tree is important for its culture and is a symbol of spirituality to its culture. After she suggested eating a brown nut (Cola acuminata) or a cream (Cola nitida). These elements existed for preparing a conversation. This type of performance can last for hours and requires a lot of concentration.

The same year, she proposed a performance for the Tate programme "Politics of Representation" in which she invited visitors to explore the concepts of identity, perception, and memory.

=== Awards ===
- 2015: Yanghyun Prize
- 2025: Nasher Prize

== Other activities ==
Nkanga was part of the jury which selected Gaëlle Choisne as winner of the Marcel Duchamp Prize in 2024.

== Exhibitions ==
- 2010: Taste of a Stone. Ikǫ, Charlottenborg Copenhagen
- 2012: Contained Measures of Shifting States. Tate Modern
- 2015: Biennale d'art contemporain de Lyon
- 2016: The Encounter That Took a Part of Me. Nottingham Contemporary
- 2017: documenta 14, Athens and Kassel
- 2018: To Dig A Hole That Collapses Again, Museum of Contemporary Art, Chicago
- 2019: From Where I Stand, Tate St. Ives
- 2020: There's No Such Thing as Solid Ground, Gropius Bau
- 2021: Of Cords Curling Into Mountains, Castello di Rivoli
- 2022: Underneath the Shade We Lay Grounded, Sint-Janshospitaal Brugge
- 2023: Otobong Nkanga: Gently Basking in Debris, Frist Art Museum
- 2024: Cadence, MOMA New York
- 2025-26: Otobong Nkanga, Musée d’Art Moderne de Paris
- 2026-27: Otobong Nkanga, Kanal – Centre Pompidou
