= Jewyo Rhii =

- Born: 1971 (age 54–55); Seoul, South Korea
- Occupation: Artist

Korean name
- Hangul: 이주요
- RR: I Juyo
- MR: I Chuyo

Jewyo Rhii (Korean: 이주요; born 1971) is a visual artist known for her sculptural installation, video, drawing, performance, and publications. Constantly displacing herself from her native Seoul, Korea, to study and work in Western Europe and the US, Rhii has come to embrace this fluid lifestyle as an integral part of her work, in such a way that her studios have functioned as exhibition spaces, and exhibition spaces as studios. She lives and works in Seoul and New York.

== Biography ==
Rhii was born in Seoul, South Korea in 1971. She received her Bachelor of Fine Arts in 1995 from Ewha Womans University in Korea. In 1997, she received her Master of Fine Arts from University of Pennsylvania, Philadelphia. In 2000, she received her Master of Arts from the Chelsea College of Arts in London. In 2014, she was artist in residency at the Rijksakademie in Amsterdam.

== Career ==
Rhii has engaged in different exhibition activities since the 1990s. She introduced her work mainly in the form of books produced for about 5 years from 1998 onwards. In these publications, the environment of the birth of physical work was recorded and documented together with the gradual flow of time around them and the changes that subsequently occurred. She published three art books in this periods that all dealt which the way people make urgent, provisional efforts to improve their physical and mental environment. These efforts, usually her own, are revealed in humorous picture stories taking the form of photos, drawings and registrations of physical works of art.

After the books, Rhii became more interested in a non-retrospective nowness. She wants to work in the physical location of an exhibition or open up her own studio working process. She investigated coincidences and made works that vary depending on the site. She carried out spontanNARFeous actions and seeks to work in unfamiliar spaces or situations in order to respond to the dynamics of the environment.

Her interest in encountering otherness originates from the experience of living abroad in many different cultures and the challenges and discoveries that brings. She often works with ephemeral objects, temporary materials and simple, fast drawings that reflect the insecurity, resentment, deficiency and vulnerability of individual physical existence and the inevitable battles with time and space. She often uses an indefinite or not quite finished installation method that expresses hesitation and the dependency of her work on the situation. Her recent works are characterised by underlying and often undisclosed stories or experiences that serve as the inspiration for installations, video and site specific works. Most of these latest works focus on the qualities of her unique relationships with people and places that drift in and out of her artistic life, sometimes seeming to share fate for a period, sometimes just briefly touching the artist's continuing existence.

== Exhibitions ==
=== Commonly Newcomer (2015) ===
For this solo exhibition, Rhii occupied a studio space at the Queens Museum since November 2013. Commonly Newcomer, a sprawling sculptural installation that explores the intuitive and experiential aspects of being a newcomer. It is also an extension of a collaborative publication titled Outside the Comfort Zone (2013) by Irene Veenstra, a Dutch art historian who visited Rhii's 2013 exhibition at the Van Abbemuseum in Eindhoven, Netherlands, for nine consecutive days. In Commonly Newcomer, Rhii experiments with re-materializing a textual incarnation of her previous work, while adopting and adapting it into her present life in Queens

Her other solo exhibitions include Dear My Anti-capitalist, Ursula Walbrol Gallery, Düsseldorf, Germany (2015); Jewyo Rhi, Wilkinson Gallery, London, England (2014); Walls To Talk To, Van Abbemuseum, Eindhoven, Netherlands; Walls To Talk To, Museum für Moderne Kunst, Frankfurt (2013); Night Studio, Artsonje Center, Seoul (2013–2014).

Recent group exhibitions include Jewyo Rhii and Jihyun Jung: Dawn Breaks, The Showroom, London, UK (2017); Le Souffleur, Ludwig Forum, Aachen, Germany, 2015; DAWN BREAKS-UNKNOWN PACKAGES, Queens Museum, New York, US (2015); PARIS TRIENNALE, INTENSE PROXIMITY, Palais de Tokyo, Paris, France (2012); TRUST, Media City Seoul, Seoul, South Korea (2010); Everyday Miracle , REDCAT, Los Angeles (2009); On The Road & Insertation, the 7th Gwangju Biennale, Gwangju, South Korea (2008); Dream House, 10th ISTANBUL BIENNALE, Antrepo, Istanbul, Turkey (2007); The Pavilion of Korea, the 51st Venice Biennale, Venice, Italy (2005); BOOM SHE BOOM, Museum für Moderne Kunst, Frankfurt, Germany (2004).

== Collections ==
Among the public collections holding work by Jewyo Rhii are MMK Museum für Moderne Kunst, Frankfurt, Germany; Van Abbemuseum, Eindhoven, Netherlands; Kunstmuseum Magdeburg, Magdeburg, Germany.

== Awards ==
- 2021 Seoul City Project Grant 'Love Your Depot_Gangnam Pavilion'
- 2020 KCCUK 2020 Artist of the Year 'Love Your Depot_LDN'
- 2019 MMCA Korea Artist Prize 2019 'Love Your Depot'
- 2010 Yanghyun Prize, Yanghyun Foundation
- 2000 Bloomberg New Contemporaries 2000

== Publication ==
- 2013 Walls To Talk To, published by Koenig books
- 2013 Night Studio, published by SAMUSO
- 2009 Of Five Carts And On, published by SAMUSO
- 2008 Jewyo Rhii(monograph), published by SAMUSO
- 2008 Ten Years, Please, published by DARUN BOOKS
- 2004 Two, independent publishing
- 2003 Warming and Humidifying, independent publishing
- 1999 Once You Lie Down, independent publishing
