= Kang Myung-sun =

South Korean artist (born 1974)

Kang Myung Sun
- Born: 1974 (age 51–52); Seoul, South Korea
- Known for: Mother-of-pearl design
- Movement: Contemporary art

Kang Myung Sun (Korean: 강명선; born 1974 in Seoul, South Korea) is a South Korean artist. Kang is well known for her mother-of-pearl design art. Kang graduated Hongik University in South Korea with a PhD in Space Design and a BFA in woodworking and furniture design.

She challenges modern designs with her own study on physical properties of new materials and approach. Kang applies traditional lacquering techniques of two thousand-year history in an attempt to feature the delicate and iridescent quality of mother-of-pearl.

== Work ==
=== Selected solo exhibitions ===
- 2006 Art Furniture, Gallery I, Seoul

=== Selected group exhibitions ===
- 2015 Living In Art II, Connect, Seomi International, Los Angeles, CA, USA
- 2015 Living In Art I, Let's Art, Seomi International, Los Angeles, CA, USA
- 2013 Contemporary Korean Design 2, R20th Century Gallery, New York
- 2012 Small Object Show, R20th Century Gallery, New York
- 2009 Korea Tomorrow 2009, SETEC, Seoul
- 2008 12 Furniture Designers, Sangsangmadang Art Square, Seoul
- 2007 Professional Designers of Cheongju International Craft Biennale, Cheongju
