= Yoon Kang-mi =

South Korean illustrator (born 1965)

- Born: Gyeongsan, South Korea
- Occupation: Picture book author
- Writing career
- Language: Korean
- Genre: Picture books
- Notable works: The Building Where Trees Grow; The Piece of Moonlight

Yoon Kang-mi (Korean: 윤강미) is a South Korean illustrator. “Yoon” is her last name. She majored in painting at university, and has presented her work in numerous exhibitions. She studied how to make picture books in various workshops. She won support for publishing her work through a visitors’ vote in the first Un-Printed Ideas exhibition hosted by the Hyundai Museum of Kids’ Books & Art in 2018. A Building Where Trees Grow is her first original picture book.

== Career ==
Yoon Kang-mi's first picture book The Building Where Trees Grow was selected via a visitors’ vote at the 1st Un-Printed Ideas exhibition, organized by the Hyundai Museum of Kids’ Books & Art in 2018. She was selected as Illustrator of the Year at the 2020 Bologna International Children's Book Fair for the book. She also won the Illustrator Award at the Lit Up! Asian Festival of Children's Content (AFCC) in Singapore for The Piece of Moonlight in 2022.

== Reception ==
The Building Where Trees Grow was praised by French critic Christophe Meunier, for how it portrays the harmony between nature and architecture, and for the imagination underlying it. Italian critic Giovanna Zoboli praised the "simplicity, linearity, immediacy of the narrative solutions adopted by Yoong Kang-mi".

== Works as writer and illustrator ==
- 2023 Mina's Little Bird (Gilbut Kids) ISBN 978-89-5582-694-4
- 2021 Moonless Night (Changbi) ISBN 978-89-364-5569-9
- 2019 The Building Where Trees Grow (Changbi) ISBN 978-89-364-5535-4
- 2019 La maison qui fleurit (Rue du Monde, France) ISBN 9782355045851
- 2019 Dove crescono gli alberi (Topipittori, Italy) ISBN 9788833700663
- 2019 長滿樹的大廈 (靑林國際出版服有限公司, Taiwan) ISBN 9789862744888
- 2019 Aǧaçlarin yetiştiği Bina (koç Üniversitesi Yayinlari çocuk kitapiari, Türkiye) ISBN 9786057685308

== Collaborations with other authors ==
- 2022 Giving Thanks (Picture Book City) ISBN 979-11-88172-09-2
- 2012 Rice is Growing in Our Classroom (Sallim Kids) ISBN 978-89-522-1750-9
