= Yoon Mi-sook =

South Korean illustrator

- Born: Seoul, South Korea
- Occupation: Illustrator
- Language: Korean
- Genre: Picture books
- Notable works: Red Bean Porridge Granny and the Tiger; The Moon over the Apple Orchard

Website
- Yoon Mi-sook on Instagram

Yoon Mi-sook (Korean: 윤미숙) is a South Korean illustrator. In 2004, she received a Bologna Ragazzi award Special Mention for Fiction at the Bologna International Children's Book Fair for Red Bean Porridge Granny and the Tiger. She also received a Special Mention in the Fiction category for The Moon over the Apple Orchard in 2019. She utilizes collage in her illustrations, using materials of varying textures such as rough-feeling lithographs, Korean paper, and colored paper. Her best-known picture books include Red Bean Porridge Granny and the Tiger, The Moon over the Apple Orchard, The Tale of the White Mouse, Little Boat Floats, Rainbow Color Word Games, and The Bucktoothed Elephant.

== Career ==
Yoon Mi-sook received Ragazzi Award Special Mentions in the Fiction category at the Bologna International Children's Book Fair for Red Bean Porridge Granny and the Tiger in 2004 and The Moon over the Apple Orchard in 2019. In The Moon over the Apple Orchard, her illustrations accompany the writings of Kwon Jeong-saeng, a Korean writer. The Ragazzi Award jury commented on her work as follows. "We were delighted by the affecting atmosphere of this picture book, which depicts everyday life in a Rural Community. The mixed-media illustrations show loving gestures, hardship, poverty, disease, and care for the elderly. In detailed scenes of the natural landscape and agricultural work, the illustrations show the richness and fragility of life." In addition, she has created numerous other picture books, including The Tale of the White Mouse, The Hare and the Tortoise, and Little Boat Floats.

== Awards ==
- 2019 Recipient of the Bologna Children's Book Fair Ragazzi Award Special Mention for Fiction – The Moon over the Apple Orchard
- 2004 Recipient of the Bologna Children's Book Fair Ragazzi Award Special Mention for Fiction – Red Bean Porridge Granny and the Tiger

== Works ==
- 2023 If I (Pulbit) ISBN 979-11-6172-569-7
- 2021 I am Na Hye-seok (Space Tree) ISBN 979-11-89489-34-2
- 2020 Little Boat Floats (Sigong Junior) ISBN 979-11-6579-177-3
- 2020 Penguin (BIR) ISBN 978-89-491-8163-9
- 2017 Shall we hold hands? (Moonji) ISBN 978-89-320-3058-6
- 2017 The Moon over the Apple Orchard (Changbi) ISBN 978-89-364-4715-1
- 2016 That Tree is Laughing (Sigong Junior) ISBN 978-89-527-8251-9
- 2015 Laughter is Powerful (Hanulim Kids) ISBN 978-89-98465-74-2
- 2014 Mr. Lumpy and the Goblins (Gilbut Kids) ISBN 978-89-5582-290-8
- 2012 The Adventures of the Three Water Drop Brothers (Woongjin Dachaek) ISBN 978-89-01-25908-6
  - 2021 The Three Water Drop Brothers (Enchanted Lion Books, English) ISBN 9781592703234
- 2010 Achem Meu Pai, por Favor – Coleção Tan Tan (CALLIS) ISBN 978-8574165035
- 2010 The Hare and the Tortoise (BIR) ISBN 978-89-491-0125-5
- 2010 Rainbow Color Word Games (Sigong Junior) ISBN 978-89-527-5719-7
- 2008 The Farmer's Dream (Yeowon Media) ISBN 979-11-393-0254-7
- 2007 Little Boat Floats (Sigong Junior) ISBN 979-11-6579-177-3
- 2007 The Bucktoothed Elephant (Woongjin Junior) ISBN 978-89-01-06884-8
- 2006 Mother's Milk is Perfect! (Woongjin Junior) ISBN 978-89-01-05999-0
- 2006 The Tale of the White Mouse (BIR) ISBN 978-89-491-0119-4
  - 2009 ふしぎなしろねずみ (岩波書店, Japan) ISBN 9784001112146
- 2005 What You Do is Always Right (Kyowon) ISBN 89-21-43199-3
- 2003 Red Bean Porridge Granny and the Tiger (Woongjin.com) ISBN 978-89-01-26006-8
