= Kyungah Ham =

Korean multi-media artist

Kyung-Ah Ham (born 1966) is a contemporary multi-media artist working in Seoul. Her works utilize handmade North Korean textiles to discuss the social and political complexities between South Korea and North Korea.

== Early life and education ==
Kyung-Ah Ham was born in 1966 in Seoul. Growing up, unofficial political propaganda sent from North Korea by helium balloons often appeared around Ham's parents' house in Seoul. As a child, Ham could turn in these pamphlets to her school for a reward. A pamphlet discovered by Ham in 2008 of former supreme leader of North Korea Kim Jong Il rekindled Ham's interest in the function of art and material as a form of unsanctioned communication.

Ham received her B.F.A. at Seoul National University (1989). Her undergraduate work highlights the ways power is abused through videos, sculptures, photographs and an assortment of installations. She earned an M.F.A. from the School of Visual Arts in New York in 1995.

== Notable works ==
Kyung-Ah Ham's large body of multimedia work considers power, communication, and anonymity. Her works typically sell at prices ranging from $25,000 to $300,000. Her solo work has been shown at galleries such as Room with a View, Gallery Loop, Seoul (1999), Such Games, Ssamzie Space, Seoul (2008), and Desire and Anesthesia, Artsonje Center, Seoul (2009). She has participated in group shows held at: British Museum, London (2005), Musee Palais de Tokyo, Paris (2010), Stiftung Ludwig Wein, Vienna (2010), National Museum of Modern and Contemporary Art, Gwacheon, Korea (travelled to Kunstmuseum Bonn, 2013), and Kunsthalle Düsseldorf (2014). She also participated in the 9th Guangdong Triennial (2012) and 7th Liverpool Biennial (2012). However, disinterested in selling, Ham prefers to lend her work to exhibitions or sell them to museums, and she has admitted that she keeps much of her work for herself.

=== Museum Display (2010) ===
An installation at The British Museum in 2010 considered how artists can contribute to the decolonization of the museum wall. Ham's collection of stolen objects from museums around the world includes forks, saucers, knives, vases, and salt and pepper shakers. Each object was displayed in a glass case under lights with extensive labels and a sign on the wall noted "Sign, 'These doors are alarmed.'

=== Needling Whisper, Needle Country/SMS Series in Camouflage (2008-2015) ===
The Needling Whisper, Needle Country / SMS Series in Camouflage is a series of embroidered textile works by Kyungah Ham, created in collaboration with anonymous North Korean artists, which began in 2008 and ended in 2015. Ham, who grew up in Seoul during a period of anti-communist military rule, was raised in an environment shaped by strong government-promoted ideological beliefs about North Korea. As a child in the 1970s, she occasionally found North Korean propaganda leaflets that had been sent across the border by balloon and, like her classmates, turned them in at school in exchange for rewards. In 2008, she discovered a similar leaflet lodged beneath the gate of her parents’ home; although it was not unlike those she had encountered before, this one felt unfamiliar and prompted a deeper curiosity about the possibility of direct communication with North Koreans. By this time, Ham had begun to question the narratives she had been taught and became interested in the idea of reaching across a politically enforced divide, viewing the leaflet as a symbol of an unknown world she felt compelled to engage with.

The works in this series initially appear as colorful abstract paintings, but when viewed more closely, they reveal hidden words, short phrases, and the texture of hand embroidery. These concealed messages include internet slang, pop culture references, news language, and personal phrases from South Korea. Several catalogues and articles describe it as a form of coded or indirect communication. The works contain phrases that North Korean censorship would never otherwise allow citizens to see. Ham developed the images digitally in South Korea before sending them to anonymous North Korean artists through the same channels used for the Chandeliers for Five Cities project, with the help of Russian and Chinese mediators. These anonymous artists would then use Ham’s instructional templates to hand embroider the design in silk thread on cotton using traditional techniques. The pieces can take upwards of 1,000 to 1,200 hours to complete by one or two embroiderers.

Because the series fundamentally depended on communication with anonymous North Korean artisans, the production process involved significant legal and personal risk. Direct contact or unsanctioned exchange with individuals in North Korea is heavily monitored and restricted, making the transfer of designs, instructions, and transporting of completed works a risky if not illegal action in most cases. As a result, the project relied on intermediaries, coded exchanges, and smuggling routes that moved through third parties before reaching the embroiderers. The unique labels attached to the works themselves also emphasize these conditions, often listing details such as “North Korean hand embroidery, silk threads on cotton, middle man, anxiety, censorship, wooden frame, approx. 1200 hours / 2 persons,” which directly references the labor, secrecy, and political tension involved in their production. While this risk is not presented as the central purpose of the SMS Series in Camouflage, it has been widely discussed as evidence of the severe political consequences created by the separation between North and South Korea. The need for secrecy in every stage of the work, from sending digital templates to returning the finished textiles, emphasizes how the division of the Korean peninsula continues to shape even the behaviors of artistic communication and labor.

Rather than functioning simply as a dramatic feature of the project, the danger involved in its production emphasizes the daily restrictions placed on contact between people on opposite sides of the border. Ham has also connected this process to the personal strain it created in her own life, stating that the stress surrounding the work became “a permanent feature” of her daily existence. This statement has often been cited as reflecting the long term emotional and political pressure produced by sustaining a project built on prohibited communication.(6)

Ham describes the project as an attempt at genuine communication with the anonymous North Korean artisans who physically produce the embroideries. Although the artists work from her templates, Ham has said that she actively thinks about how the embroiderers might read or interpret the hidden phrases stitched into the works, and what kind of message she is sending to them through the process itself. This concern with how the artisans encounter the text adds a more direct interpersonal dimension to the series, extending it beyond abstraction or textile process alone. One example appears in a work containing the phrase “I’m sorry” in both Korean and English, a message that has been discussed as one of the clearest expressions of Ham’s interest in connection across the political divide. In interviews and exhibition texts, Ham explained that this phrase was intended as an address to the North Korean embroiderers themselves, saying that she wanted to tell them she was sorry about the situation and “sorry about what history has done to us.” The inclusion of this bilingual apology has been interpreted as strong evidence of her continued focus on communication, shared history, and the human consequences of national separation.

=== What you see is the unseen/Chandeliers for Five Cities (2016) ===
An ongoing project started in 2016 of five chandeliers assembled in South Korea with silk and cotton textiles handmade by anonymous artists in North Korea. The five chandeliers in this show represent the five cities of the participating countries of the 1945 Potsdam Declaration. These chandeliers symbolize the division of foreign powers that divided Korea in 1945, all of which have fallen as represented by the embroidered chandeliers positioned on the floor of the gallery space.

Ham's process begins with a digitized censored pattern that she sends to female artists in North Korea with the help of Chinese and Russian mediators. The images and content she highlight often would be removed from the public by North Korean officials but circulate freely in South Korea. A group of anonymous artisans is paid to convert her patterns into embroideries, using bright silk thread and exquisitely fine stitching. Receiving textiles from North Korea can take up to a year and a half as they are smuggled back to her using her intermediaries and bribed officials in both North and South Korea. Ham acquires the embroideries folded up in a black plastic bag, reeking of cigarette smoke. Ham notes that the colors of the silk thread used are often very unexpectedly bright, which she considers may help the artisans as they work in dimly lit facilities. After she receives the pieces, she unfolds and spreads the fabrics out in her studio before she begins to affix them to Southern-made chandelier frames. Her work is shown and sold internationally. Each hand-embroidered image contains a label that lists the materials used, the number of hours the work took, and other factors of the creative process like 'censorship' and 'ideology'. Ham's embroideries are also notably influenced by recorded footage of Pyongyang's specialty-realist Mass Games.

== Controversies and reception ==
Hams's use of illegal outsourced labor puts her at high risk as the artist and negotiator of these transactions. Both Ham and her team of anonymous female artisans could face extreme consequences for these transactions. Ham could be criminally persecuted for her facilitation, and those working for her in North Korea could face unjust imprisonment or execution for their contributions. Some of Kyungah Ham's works have been confiscated by North Korean Authorities, and Ham cites several patterns sent to North Korea that were edited and censored by those working for her.

== Personal life ==
Ham's spoken publicly about the effects of this project on her mental health, in addition to the experiences and feelings she has listed under project labels. The Embroidery Project, which involves illegal cash transactions, bribes, and intermediaries has made stress a permanent fixture in her life.

Out of necessity, Ham has become protective over her image and the details of her process. Available sources that cite Ham specifically are reviewed by Ham before publication, and she declines most press coverage.
