= Young-ja Cho =

South Korean sculptor

Young-Ja Cho
- Known for: Sculptor

Korean name
- Hangul: 조영자
- RR: Jo Yeongja
- MR: Cho Yŏngja

Young-Ja Cho (born 1951 Busan, South Korea) is a South Korean sculptor.

== Life ==
Young-Ja Cho was born in Busan, South Korea, but currently lives in Molicciara, Italy. She is inspired by Buddhism and Greek mythology; concepts from her native country and her country of residence. Her bronze sculptures usually feature fragments of the human figure, combined with plants and animals. The fragmented forms suggest an ongoing narrative of agrarian allure and oneness with nature. A graduate of Hongik University, she has shown her bronze works extensively in Seoul, including a group show in 1989 entitled 'Women Artists in the 1980s', held at the Kumho Gallery.

Her work is in the National Museum of Women in the Arts.

== Career and artistic development ==
Cho Young-Ja (born 1951 in Busan, South Korea) is a sculptor working mainly in bronze. Her works often feature partial human forms together with plants or animals, a combination that appears in most of her pieces since the late 1970s. She studied sculpture at Hongik University in Seoul, completing a BFA in 1974 and an MFA in 1976, before continuing her training at the Accademia di Belle Arti di Carrara in Italy in 1987. Records show that her work has been included in group exhibitions in both South Korea and Italy, such as “Women Artists in the 1980s” at the Kumho Museum of Art in 1989 and “Ten Contemporary Korean Women Artists” at the National Museum of Women in the Arts in Washington, D.C., in 1991. Several commercial galleries list her birth year as 1951 and document the sale of bronze sculptures from multiple series.
