= Young Gi Han =

South Korean artist

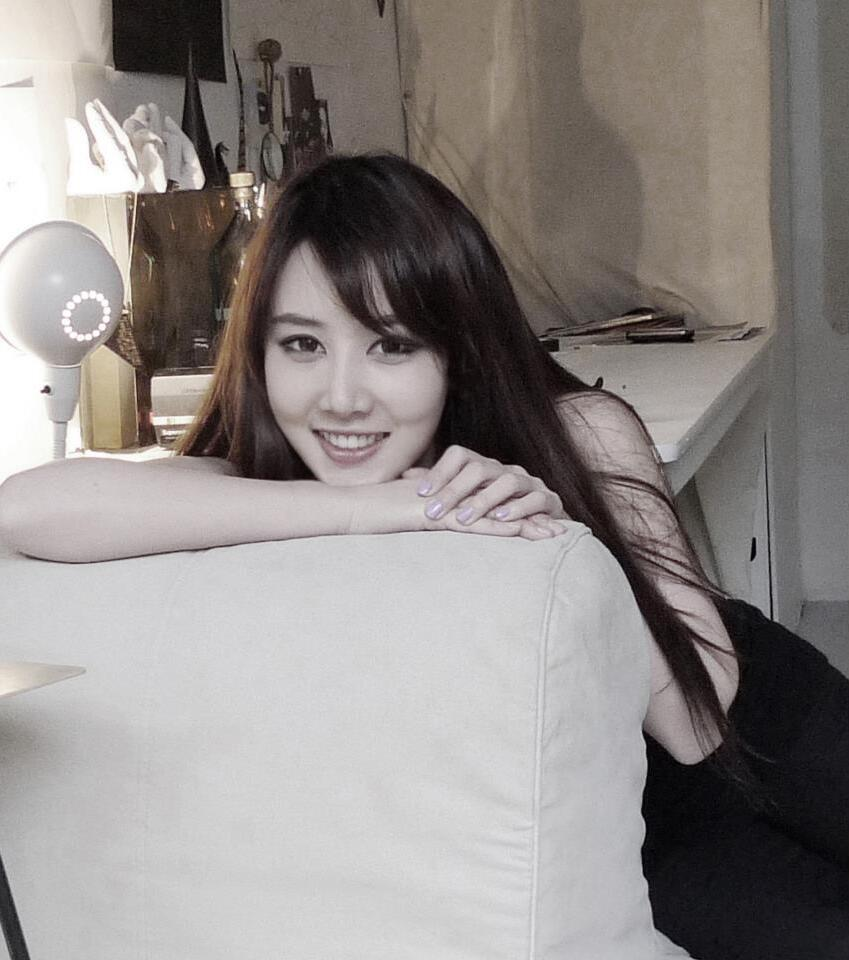
- Born: South Korea
- Education: School of Visual Arts; Kyung Hee University
- Occupation: Artist
- Style: Painting and printmaking

Korean name
- Hangul: 한영지
- RR: Han Yeongji
- MR: Han Yŏngji
- IPA: [ha̠ɲ.jʌ̹ŋd͡ʑi]

Young Gi Han (Korean: 한영지) also known as Tina Han, is a South Korean artist.

== Early life ==
Young Gi Han was born in South Korea. She received a Bachelor of Fine Arts degree in 2008 from the School of Visual Arts in Manhattan, New York City, New York. In 2013, she then received a Master of Fine Arts degree from Kyung Hee University in Seoul, Korea. She also had a fellowship at the Contemporary Artists Center in Troy, New York.

== Career ==
Han is a painter and printmaker. Her work has been exhibited at Amos Eno Gallery, Artifact Gallery, Blue Mountain Gallery, Brooklyn Art Cluster, Elizabeth Foundation for the Arts, Gyeomjae Jeongseon Art Museum, Leigh Wen Gallery, and Visual Arts Gallery.

Her art studio is in Bushwick, Brooklyn, New York City, New York.

== Personal life ==
Han lives in New York City, New York.
