= Kyung-hwa Choi-ahoi =

South Korean artist (born 1967)

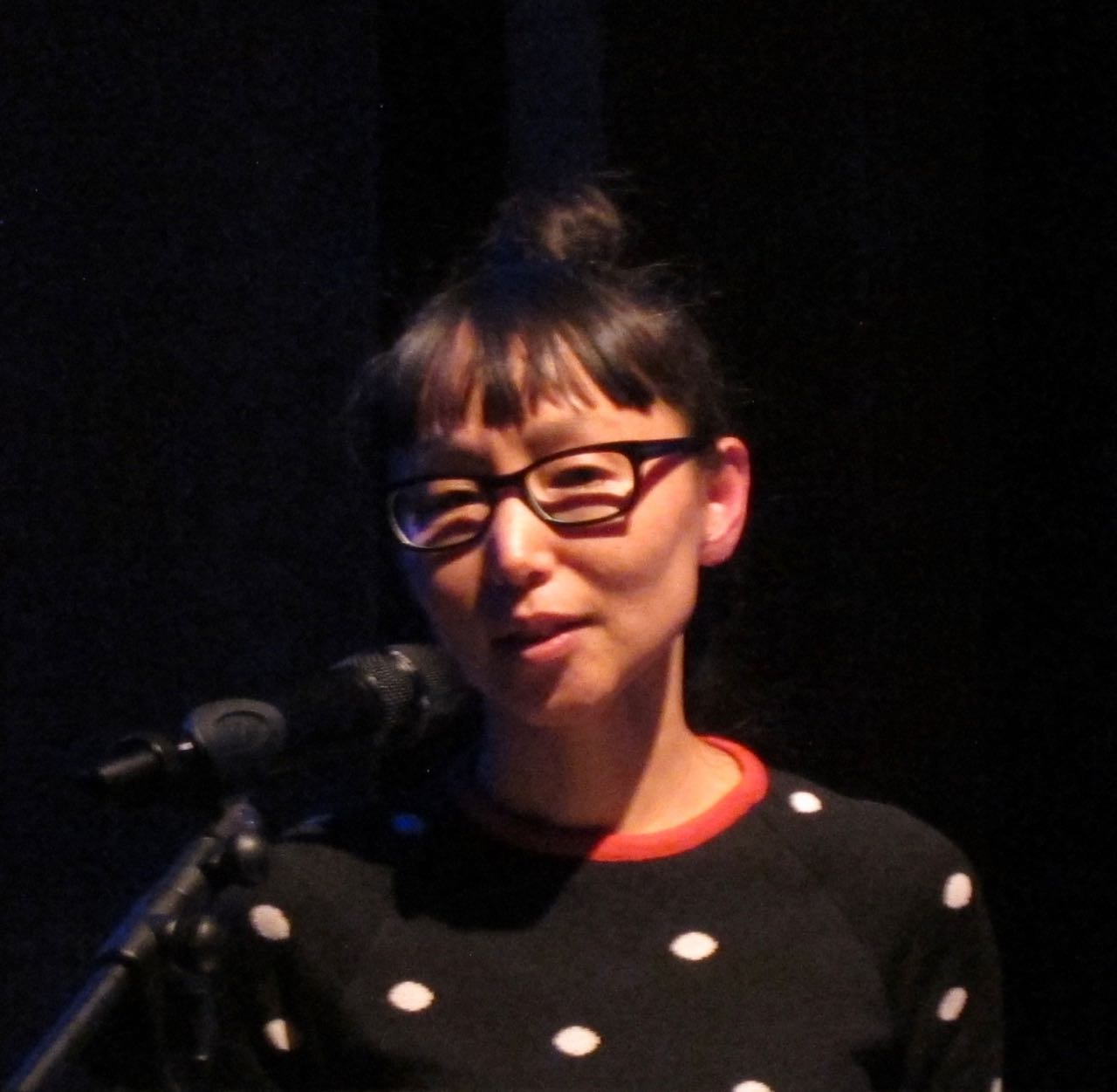
- Choi-ahoi in 2015
- Born: Kyung-hwa Choi; 1967 (age 58–59); Seoul
- Known for: Drawing
- Spouse: Nikos Valsamakis (Painter)
- Website: kyunghwachoiahoi.com

- Kyung-hwa Choi-ahoi
- Hangul: 최경화
- Hanja: 崔京華
- RR: Choe Gyeonghwa
- MR: Ch'oe Kyŏnghwa

Kyung-hwa Choi-ahoi (Korean: 경화 초이-아호이; born 1967 in Seoul) is a South Korean graphic artist, author and university teacher living in Germany, with a focus on drawing. From 2015 to 2019, she was a professor for drawing at the University of the Arts Bremen and has been a professor for drawing at the Weißensee Academy of Art Berlin since 2019. She lives in Hamburg and Berlin.

== Life ==
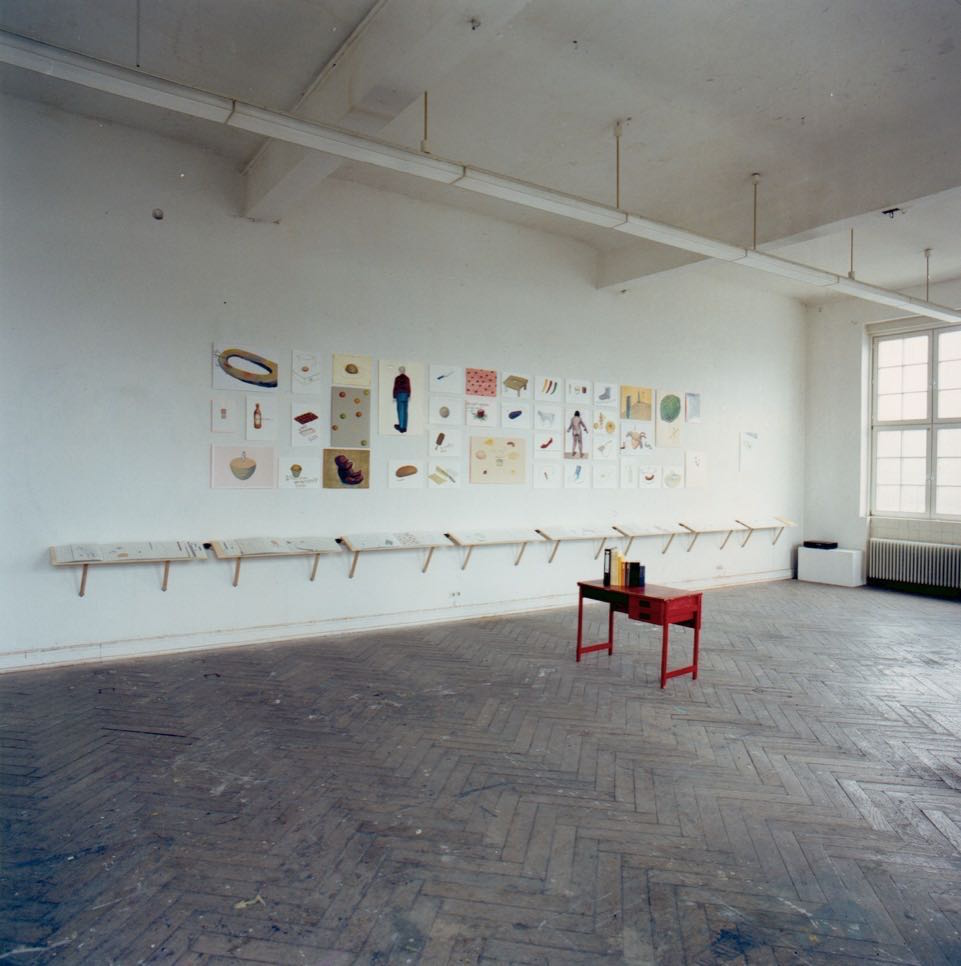
Diploma Exhibition (2001)

Choi-ahoi went to Germany in 1991 to attend university, first in Trier and Mainz, where she started with studies in art history, philosophy and Latin. In 1994 she changed universities and her major: she enrolled in art classes at the University of Fine Arts of Hamburg with KP Brehmer, Werner Büttner and Fritz W. Kramer. Her last name is a pseudonym, a pun that plays with Hamburg’s status as an important harbor city, because Hamburg was her first home in Germany. In 1998 she completed a stage design internship at the Thalia Theater in Hamburg in the production Blau in Blau (Blue in Blue), directed by Stefan Moskov. From 1999 to 2000, she spent a semester abroad on an Erasmus scholarship at the Academy of Fine Arts Vienna with Franz Graf.

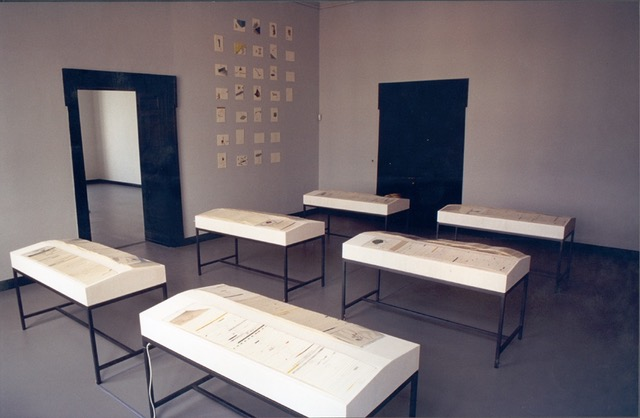
Exhibition View Fern und Nah, 2001 (Far and Near)

In 2001, Choi-ahoi was awarded the Karl H. Ditze Prize in Hamburg for her diploma work. From 2001 to 2003, after graduating, she completed postgraduate studies with Werner Büttner. Since 2011, Choi-ahoi has been working as a university lecturer alongside her own artistic work, initially as a lecturer in drawing at the Hamburg University of Applied Sciences, Faculty of Design, Media and Information. In 2015 she accepted a professorship for drawing at the University of the Arts Bremen in the master studio of the School of Visual Combinations, which artistically combines the fields of typography, drawing, editorial design and publishing.

She is married to a former fellow student from her years at the University of Fine Arts in Hamburg, the Greek painter Nikos Valsamakis. She lives in Hamburg and Berlin.

== Works ==
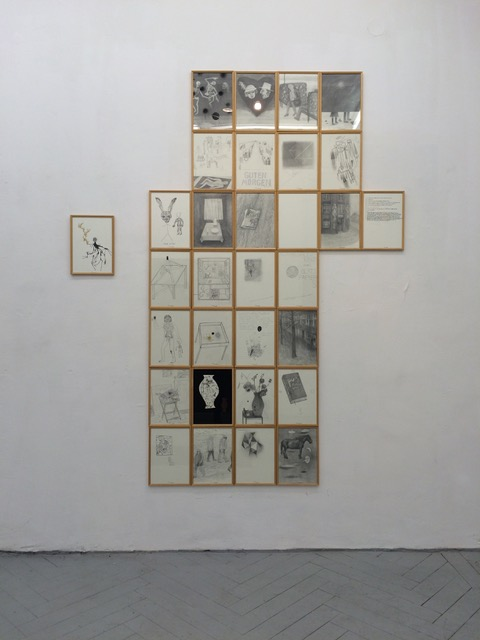
Calendar Layout Month February 2016 Nachbilder der Erinnerung (Afterimages of Imagination)

Kyung-hwa Choi-ahoi's work combines elements of drawing and recording to create an art form of its own. "From an early age, she combined drawings with poetic journaling—a practice she has continued to this day", wrote the German art historian Belinda Grace Gardner. "The diary drawings that have become her trademark have been emerging since the first semester, when she began to produce drawings on five to ten A4 sheets of paper every day."

=== Drawing projects ===
In 1999 the idea was born to produce one or two diary drawings every day as part of a long-term project. In these diary pages, Choi-ahoi processed encounters with poetic and everyday objects, events, and people from her personal environment. To date she has created thousands of diary drawings; in 2021 their number reached over 8,000. Each drawing is typewritten and dated on the front. More than 200 diary drawings are part of the collection of the Hamburger Kunsthalle, where Choi-ahoi had her first solo exhibition in 2001 titled Fern und Nah (Far and Near).

Since 2000 she has also been working continuously on the drawing project Enzyklopädie Personae (Encyclopedia Personae), a drawn social history of her time. It contains quick sketches of people from her environment, whom she follows for a day—from getting up to going to bed—in a drawn documentation. In DIN A5 notebooks, she records how these people spend their day and writes down answers to personal questions. By 2021, more than seventy of these booklets had been created.

After a residency at Ritzebüttel Castle in Cuxhaven in 2013, she started to incorporate elements from nature into her drawings, often in relation to parts of human anatomy. Between 2012 and 2014, she worked intensively on anatomical studies. Since then, the world of plants has found its way into the drawing project Garten (Garden).

=== Artist books ===
In 1999, Choi-ahoi's first artistic book publication, Buchstäbliche Zeichnung – Zeichnerische Buchstaben (Letteral Drawing – Drawing Letters), was published by the in-house Materialverlag of the Hamburg University of Fine Arts. Later, she published other artist books, such as Lieber Geld (Rather/Dear Money), published in 2014, which journalist Anna Brenken described as "a mosaic that is as curious as it is poetic". In it, Choi-ahoi proves her "invaluable talent for discovering the great world theater in a small form in everyday life". In the afterword to Von Hamburg nach Wien und zurück: Tag.Buch.Zeichnung 1999 und 2000 (From Hamburg to Vienna and back: Day.Book.Drawing 1999 and 2000), published by Textem Verlag in 2020, publisher Michael Glasmeier writes:

Inherent in the Hamburg-Vienna diary are the incessant movements of searching, trying, and orientation of a student. ... This coincides with Choi-ahoi's extraordinary and unconditional curiosity (curiositas) as a will to know, as a 'pleasure of the eyes' (Augustinus), which begins with amazement and is then transformed and appropriated through artistic, writing actions. (translated from German)

— Michael Glasmeier

Diary Drawings

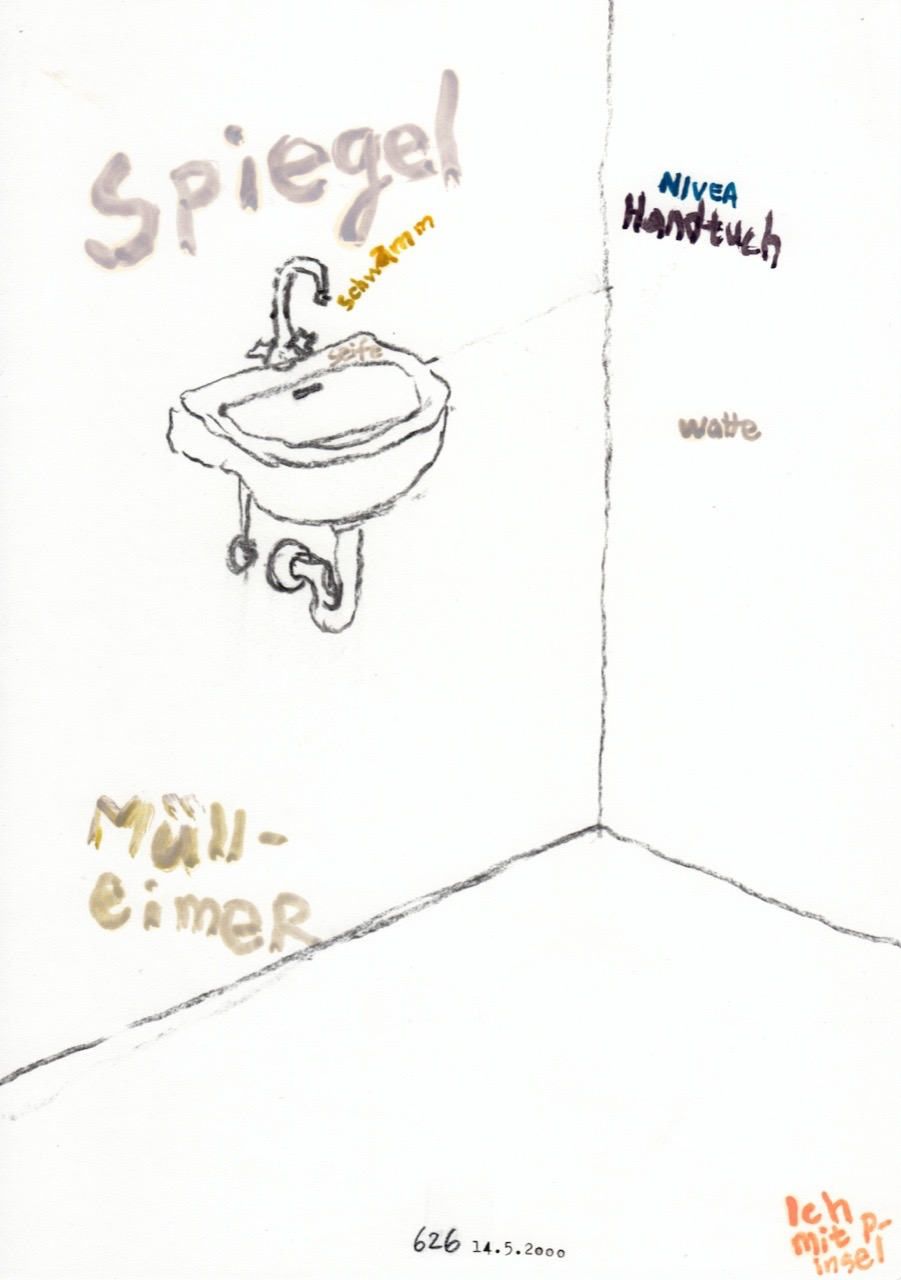
Nr. 626 14.5.2000

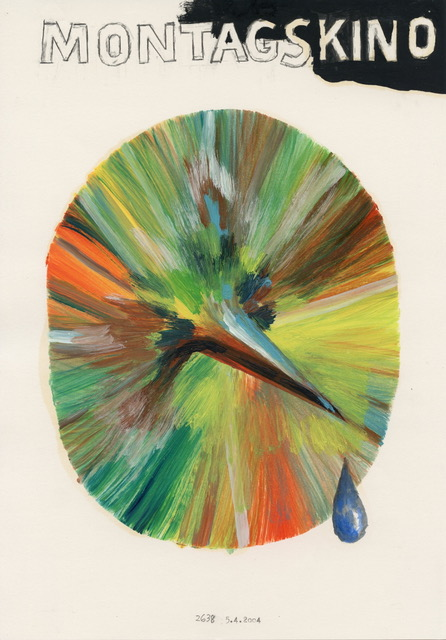
Nr. 2638 5.4.2004

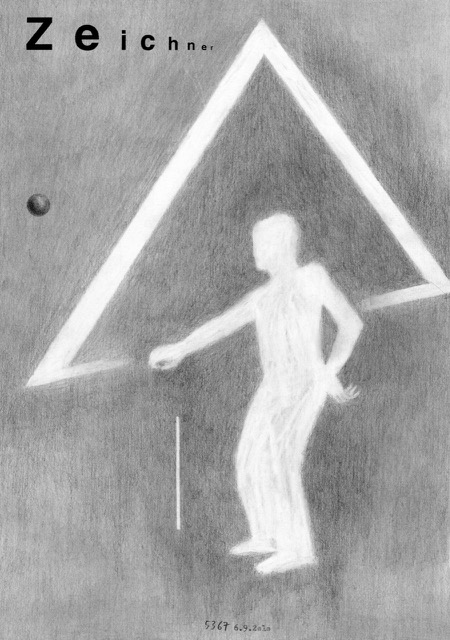
Nr. 5367 6.9.2010

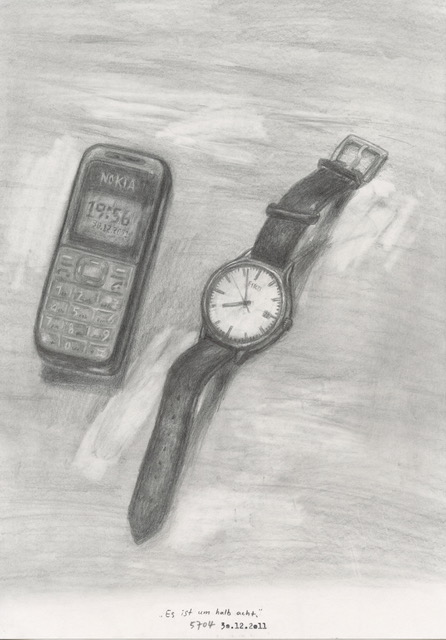
Nr. 5704 30.12.2011

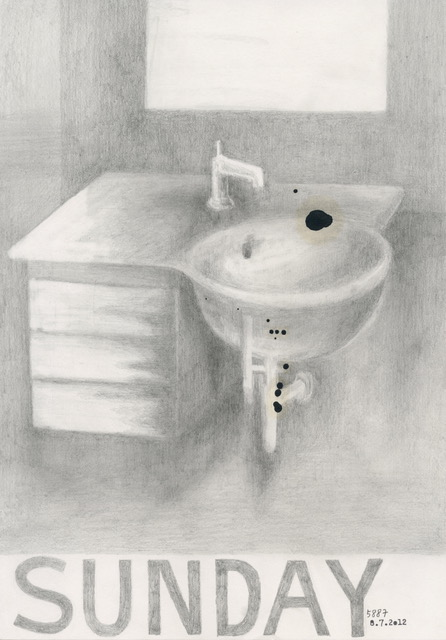
Nr. 5887 8.7.2012

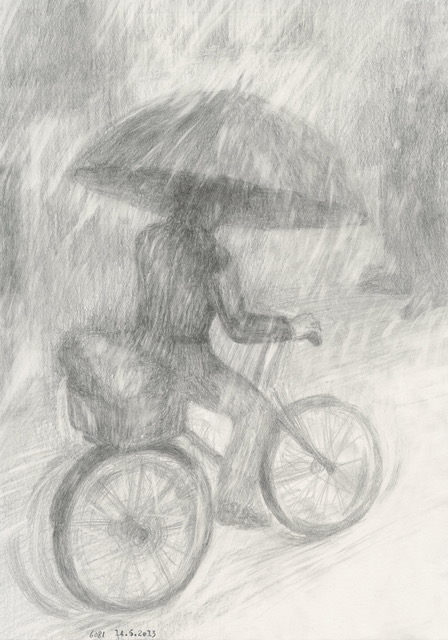
Nr. 6081 14.6.2013

== Awards and prizes ==
- 2001: Karl H. Ditze Prize
- 2014: Sella Hasse Art Prize, Hamburg

== Fellowships and residencies ==
- 2002: Fellowship Künstlerhäuser Worpswede
- 2004: Hamburg Work Grant
- 2004: Fellowships Künstlerhaus Lauenburg
- 2005: Hans-Günther-Baass-Grant, Hamburg
- 2005: Fellowship of Künstlerdorf Schöppingen
- 2007: Fellowship Künstlerhaus Cismar Abbey
- 2011: Art Residency in Bad Gastein
- 2013: Fellowship at Künstlerhaus Schloss Ritzebüttel, Cuxhaven

== Exhibitions (selection) ==
=== Solo exhibitions ===
- 2001: Fern und Nah, Hamburger Kunsthalle
- 2003: himmelblau, Kunstverein Rügen
- 2003: Pigment ohne Zucker, Art and Henle Gallery, Berlin
- 2004: 20 December 2004, ProjecteSD Gallery, Barcelona
- 2004: tag.buch.zeichnung, Gruppe Grün Gallery, Bremen
- 2004: redwine from chile, Künstlerhaus Lauenburg
- 2006: 18 March 2005, Künstlerhaus Hamburg
- 2010: In Wort und Zeichnung, Kramer Fine Art Gallery, Hamburg
- 2013: Heitere Tage, Kunstverein Schallstadt
- 2014: Mutterkorn, Hengevoss-Dürkop Gallery, Hamburg
- 2015: Augen äpfeln, Nasen blühn, Heine-Haus, Hamburg
- 2020: Ovar, Hengevoss-Dürkop Gallery, Hamburg

=== Group exhibitions ===
- 1998: Knapp getroffen ist auch daneben, Kunstverein Kehdingen
- 1999: Die Bücher der Künstler, Library of Academy of Fine Arts Vienna
- 1999: Similar Grounds, Kampnagel KX, Hamburg
- 1999: Kunst in der Börse, Handelskammer Hamburg
- 2000: Nägel mit Zöpfen, Palais of Contemporary Art, Glückstadt (Palais für aktuelle Kunst Glückstadt)
- 2004: Kunst in Hamburg. Heute, Hamburger Kunsthalle
- 2004: Stipendiaten 2004, Westwerk, Hamburg
- 2006: Kunst in Hamburg. Heute ll, Hamburger Kunsthalle
- 2006: Lulea Sommer Biennale, Schweden
- 2007: Unfair '07, Ileana Tounta Gallery, Athens
- 2007: keine Zeichnung, kein Zeichner, Kunstverein Rügen
- 2007: Particules libres – nouvelle, Cité internationale des arts Paris
- 2008: Wir nennen es Hamburg, Kunstverein Hamburg
- 2008: present perfekt / portraits, Martin Asbæk Projects Gallery, Copenhagen
- 2010: Nominierter Index, Kunsthaus Hamburg
- 2010: Da Hood II, Gängeviertel Hamburg
- 2013: Zeichnung pur, Hengevoss-Dürkop Gallery, Hamburg
- 2014: Chill Out!, Hengevoss-Dürkop Gallery, Hamburg
- 2014: Bremer Kunstfrühling, site of the former freight yard (Güterbahnhof) Bremen
- 2015: Erinnerung, Hengevoss-Dürkop Gallery, Hamburg
- 2016: Hoehen Rausch, Eigen+Art Lab Gallery, Berlin
- 2016: Literatur in den Häusern der Stadt, C15 Lohmann Collection, Hamburg
- 2016: Nachbilder der Erinnerung, Frise Künstlerhaus Hamburg
- 2017: La Cuisine Allmonde, Galerie du Tableau, Marseille
- 2017: Künstlerbücher für Alles, Weserburg Museum für moderne Kunst Bremen
- 2017: Eros, Hengevoss-Dürkop Gallery, Hamburg
- 2017: Immer Ärger mit den Großeltern, Künstlerhaus Sootbörn und Kunsthaus Dresden
- 2018: Stuttgart Sichten, Deichtorhallen Hamburg
- 2019: Envisioning America, Hengevoss-Dürkop Gallery, Hamburg
- 2019: Aufenthaltswahrscheinlichkeiten, Flag Studio, Osaka
- 2019: The Bangkok Triennale International Print and Drawing 5, Bangkok
- 2020: Eye of Mobile, Onkaf Gallery, New Delhi

Exhibition Views (Selection)

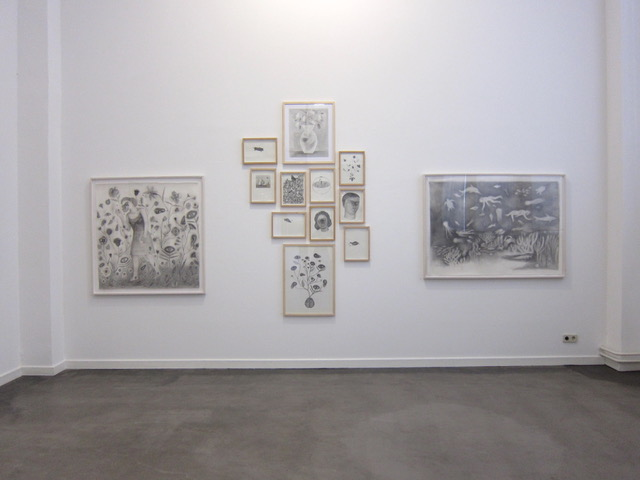
Zeichnung Pur Hengevoss-Dürkop Gallery (2013)

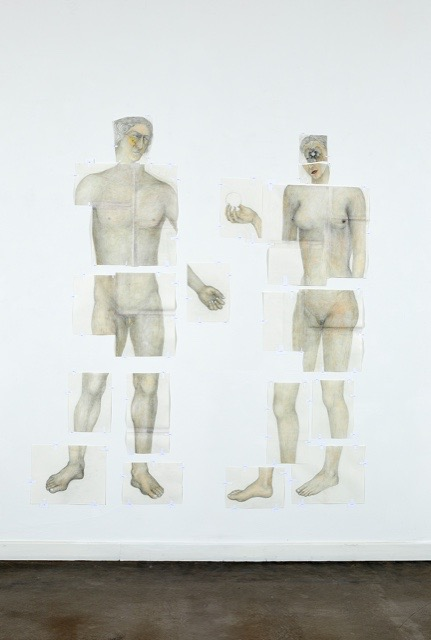
OVAR (Detail)

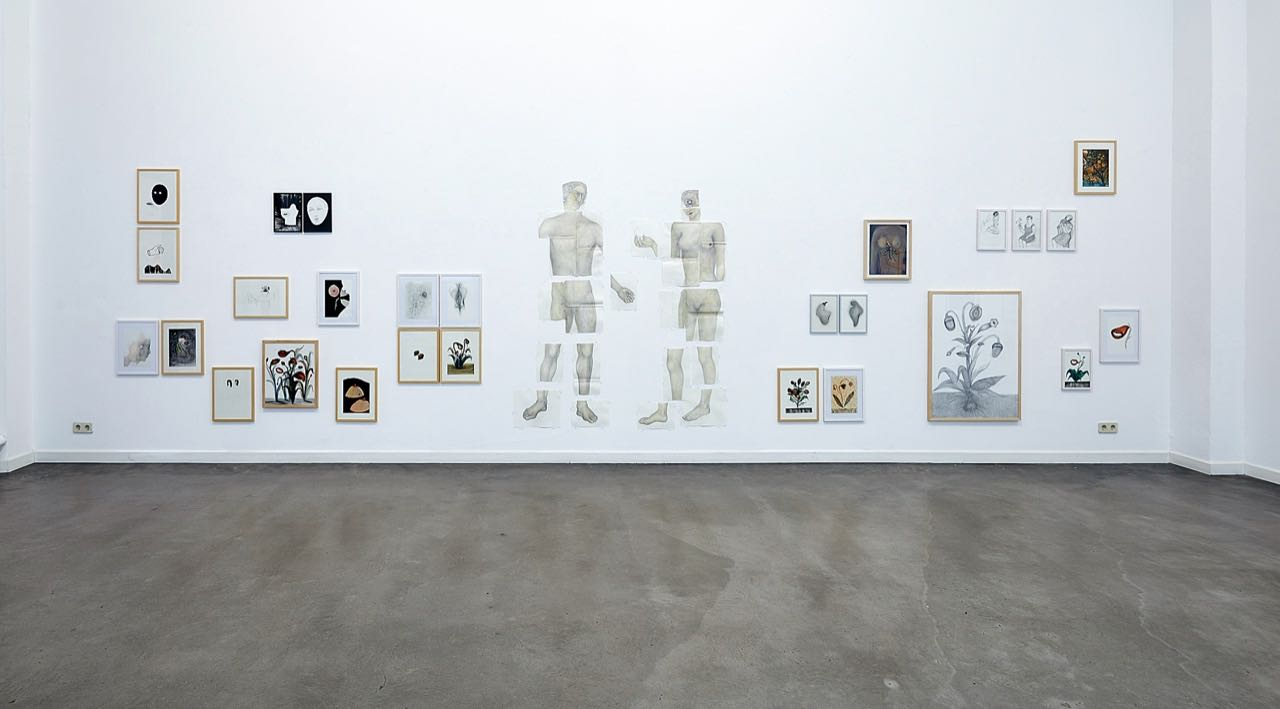
OVAR, Hengevoss-Dürkop Gallery (2020)

== Publications ==
- (1999) Buchstäbliche Zeichnung – Zeichnerische Buchstaben. Edition Zeichnung, Material 104. Hamburg: Materialverlag. ISBN 978-3-932395-08-6. (in German)
- (2008) Kunstraum Heidorf (ed.): Cook and People. Erinnerungen an eine Stadt. Hamburg: Strodehner Presse. ISBN 978-3-940021-15-1. (in German)
- (2010) Augenarzt und Uhrmacher. Hamburg: Textem Verlag. ISBN 978-3-941613-21-8
- (2014) Lieber Geld. Hamburg: Textem Verlag. ISBN 978-3-864850-74-5. (in German)
- (2020) Von Hamburg nach Wien und zurück: Tag.Buch.Zeichnung 1999 und 2000. Hamburg: Textem Verlag. ISBN 978-3-864852-38-1. (in German)
- (2021) Drawings in: Insa Härtel (ed.): Reibung und Reizung: Psychoanalyse, Kultur und deren Wissenschaft. Hamburg: Textem Verlag. ISBN 978-3-864852-37-4. (in German)

== Literature ==
- (2011) von Goetz, Andrea (ed.): Kunstresidenz Bad Gastein – Stipendiaten 2011. Hamburg: VGS Art. ISBN 978-3-000360-83-1. (in German)
- (2020) Kramer, Fritz W.: Unter Künstlern. Erkundungen im Lerchenfeld. Bemerkungen zu werdenden Künstlern. Series: Campo. Hamburg: Textem Verlag. ISBN 978-3-86485-240-4. (in German)
