= Younhee Yang =

South Korean painter (born 1977)

- Born: July 10, 1977; Seoul, South Korea
- Education: Dankook University
- Known for: Painting

Korean name
- Hangul: 양윤희
- RR: Yang Yunhui
- MR: Yang Yunhŭi

Younhee Yang (Korean: 양윤희, born July 10, 1977) is a contemporary South Korean painter.

== Life and work ==
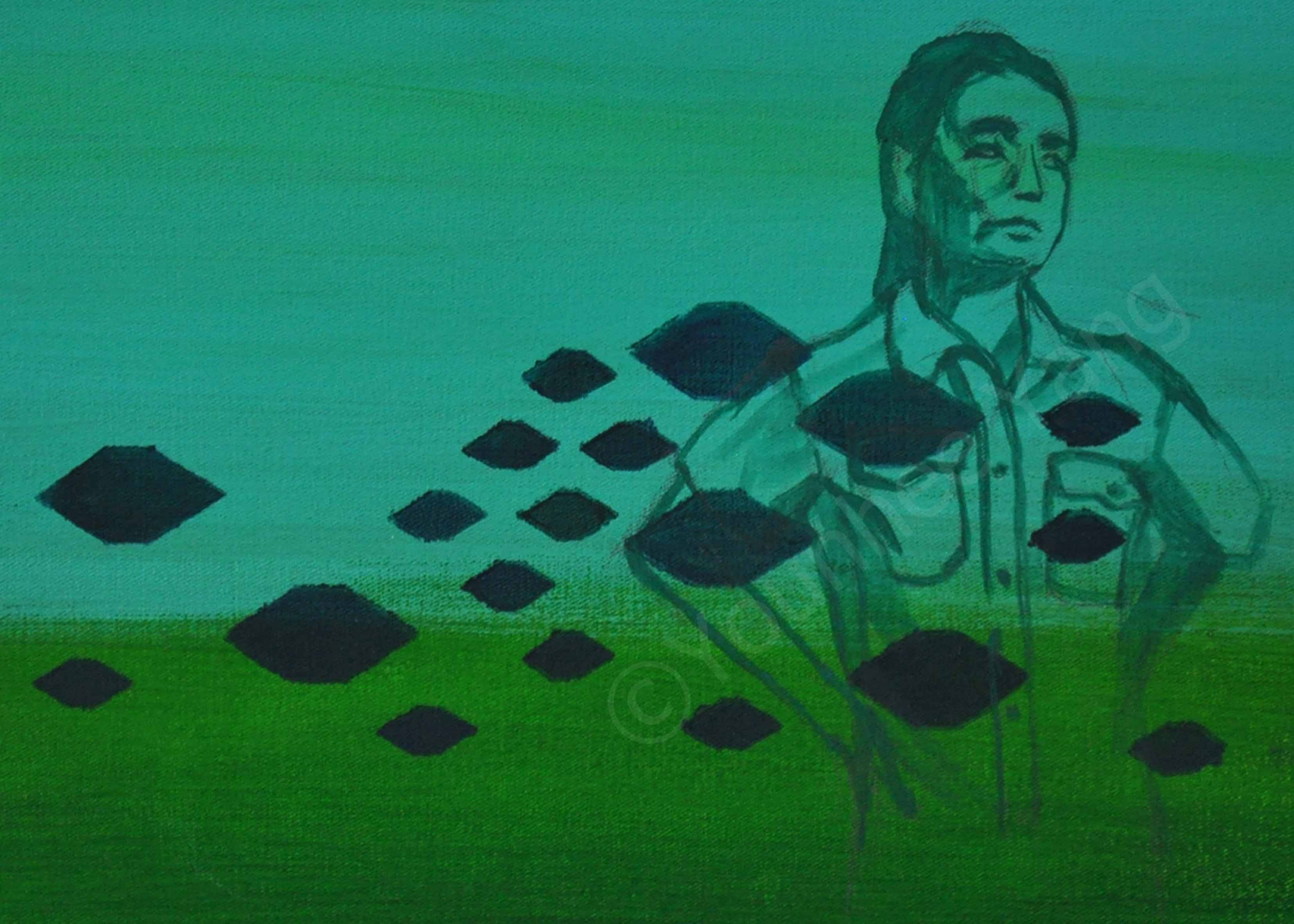
"Working Woman", Borderless - Grenzenlos I Gouache on Canvas, 30 x 40 cm, 2008, Younhee Yang

Yang was born in Seoul, and received her BFA in painting in 2005 from the Parsons School of Design in New York City. In 1998, she studied Oriental painting at the Dankook University (단국대학교) in Cheonan, Korea. Her artist work consists of painting, Installation art, Sculpture and Video art.

Yang's art has been exhibited internationally in Germany, Austria, South Korea, Canada, and in the United States of America. Among the museums and galleries having shown her work are the Korean Broadcasting and Advertisement Museum in Seoul, South Korea, the Gong Art Space gallery in Seoul, South Korea and the DadaPost Galerie in Berlin, Germany. Besides other art publications, the American sculptor Howard McCalebb published the monograph Silent Pictures, The paintings of Yang YounHee about Yang's work in 2012.

Yang works as an independent artist and founded the fine art studio Kunstatelier Younhee Yang, Berlin 2009 in Berlin-Mitte, Germany. The art studio moved from 2012 to 2018 to Berlin-Charlottenburg, Germany. Since 2018, the Kunstatelier YounHee Yang, Berlin is located at Anton-Saefkow-Platz.8, 10369 Berlin, Germany, where it is located at current. Yang supports international social projects through her work.

Yang lives in Seoul, South Korea and in Berlin, Germany.

== Exhibitions (selection) ==
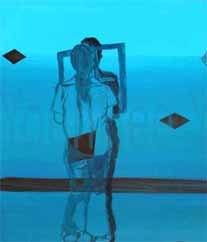
"Mirror", Guache on Canvas, 2008, Younhee Yang

- 2016: Sprudelwasser {Reflections}, 2016, AMgallery, Germany
- 2014: Silent Pictures II, 2014, DadaPost Galerie, Berlin, Germany
- 2013: Photo Op: Photo Opportunity: The Ubiquity of Photography, 2013, DadaPost Galerie, Berlin, Germany
- 2012: Gasteig Open Video, Gasteig, Munich, Germany
- 2012: Silent Pictures, DadaPost Galerie, Berlin, Germany
- 2012: Bilder, Briefe, Noten LXXVI, Autorengalerie 1, Munich, Germany
- 2012: Bilder, Briefe, Noten LXXIV, Autorengalerie 1, Munich, Germany
- 2011: Gasteig Open Video, Gasteig, Munich, Germany
- 2011: Imaginative fairytale, Gong Art Space Gallery, Seoul, South Korea
- 2010: Gasteig Open Video, Gasteig, Munich, Germany
- 2010: 14th Art Exhibition: Unification of Korea, Korean Broadcasting and Advertisement Museum, Seoul, South Korea
- 2010: Scope Miami Artfair, Miami, USA
- 2010: Youth Cult, DadaPost Galerie, Berlin, Germany
- 2010: Mit den Augen der Anderen, Galerie Magnificat, Berlin, Germany
- 2009: Rise & Fall, BOA Life LLC, travelling exhibition, United States
- 2009: Personally Political – Contemporary Sensation, Kunsthaus Tacheles, Berlin, Germany
- 2008: Imagination and Reality, International Academy for Fine Arts Salzburg, Hallein, Austria
- 2005: Threaded, Anna-Maria and Stephen Kellen Gallery, Parsons, New York City, NY, USA
- 2004: Obsession, Arnold and Sheila Aronson Gallery, Parsons, New York City, NY, USA

== Literature ==
- Lemonidou, Eve (2010), International Contemporary Artists, Vol. 1, TCA Publishing, 2010, ISBN 9789609322980
- Tunberg, Despina (2011), International Dictionary of Artists, World Wide Art Books, 2011, ISBN 0980207940
- McCalebb, Howard (2012), Silent Pictures: The Paintings of YounHee Yang, BOD, ISBN 9783848208555
- McCalebb, Howard (2013), Autobiography as Critique, DadaPost, ISBN 9783000427916
