= Lee Myung-ae =

South Korean picture book author and illustrator

- Born: Seoul, South Korea
- Occupation: Illustrator; author
- Language: Korean
- Genre: Picture book

Website
- instagram.com/myungaelee

Lee Myung-ae (Korean: 이명애 is a South Korean picture book author and illustrator. Her best-known works include Plastic Island, 10 Seconds, Tomorrow Will Be a Sunny Day, Vacation, and Flower.

Lee's first original picture book, Plastic Island won the 2015 Nami Concours Green Island Award and the 2015 BIB Golden Apple Award for its creative approach.

== Awards ==
- 2015 Nami Concours Green Island Award for Plastic Island
- 2015 BIB Golden Plaque Award for Plastic Island
- 2017 Nami Concours Green Island Award for Tomorrow Will Be a Sunny Day
- 2020 Shortlisted for the AOI World Illustration Awards 2020
- 2021 Won the BIB Golden Apple Award for Tomorrow Will Be a Sunny Day

== Works ==
- 2021 Flower (Munhakdongne)ISBN 9788954684217
- 2021 Vacation (Morae-al)ISBN 9791157854981
- 2020 Plastic Island (Sang Publishing)ISBN 9788991126527
  - 2022 МУСОРный OCTPOB (Самокат, Russia)ISBN 978-5-00167-397-2
  - 2019 塑料岛 (山东教育出版社 Shandong Education Publishing, China)ISBN 978-7532895670
  - 2019 Sur mon île (De La Martinière Jeunesse, France)ISBN 9782732490564
  - 2018 塑膠島 (字畝文化, Taiwan)ISBN 9789869550864
  - 2017 いろのかけらのしま (Poplar Corporation, Japan)ISBN 978-4-591-15618-6
- 2020 Tomorrow Will Be a Sunny Day (Munhakdongne)ISBN 9788954660075
- 2015 10 Seconds (Bandal)ISBN 9788956186641
- 2014 Plastic Island (Sang Publishing)ISBN 9788991126428

== Activities ==
- 2022 Exhibition of original artwork at the Jeonju International Picture Book Fair
- 2021 Invited to the Asian Festival of Children's Content in Singapore
- 2020 Online exhibition, Picture Books as Everyday Art, at the Seoul Design Foundation
