= JeeYoung Lee =

South Korean artist

- 이지영
- Born: 1983 (age 41–42)
- Education: Hongik University
- Notable work: Resurrection, 2011
- Movement: Surrealism

JeeYoung Lee (Korean: 이지영; born 1983) is a South Korean visual artist. She graduated from Hongik University in Seoul and received the Sovereign Art Prize in 2012. Her photographs are held in the Kyoto Photographic Museum in Japan, the Incheon Foundation for Art and Culture, and Seoul's OCI Museum.

Lee is known for her surreal images, which she creates by physically transforming her studio space into intricate and imaginative dreamscapes using hand-constructed props and then photographing them without digital manipulation. Restrained by conventional photography medium, Lee added plastic creativity and theatrical performance to it.

== Early life ==
JeeYoung Lee grew up aspiring to be a painter, and enrolling in an art highschool was her first step to making it a reality. She then attended Hongik University to pursue a degree in Visual Communication Design. At the time, she was interested in film production art, but after taking a break from school to work as an assistant in a commercial production company, Lee realized that she would not take that path. While in search for a career path that would allow her to fully express her creativity, she worked on a photography exhibition as a project that helped her attain her bachelor's degree. This led her to find her niche, photography, and to continue her studies on the topic going into graduate school.

== Works ==
Lee's art can be broken down into building, capturing, and then destroying. She uses the process of building the set as a way to relax herself from social repression and frustration, and to reflect about her inner conflicts, seeking to express them outwards. She then uses photography as a medium to record her reality. By finally destroying the set in the end, she puts the moment back in the past. Lee describes this entire process as a practice of emotional discipline.

It takes about two to three months for Lee to complete one of her works. She works in a small, 12 x 14 x 8 feet studio to create the entirety of her elaborate scenes, removing the need for any photoshop at the end.

=== Notable Pieces ===
Resurrection

This work was created in inspiration from the Tale of Sim Chong, a Korean folktale. Lotus flowers in Asian cultures symbolize rebirth and purity. By placing herself within the Lotus flower, Lee expresses how she has been reborn into a stronger figure, having overcome the negative elements in her life that were dragging her down.

Anxiety

This work addresses common worries, insecurity, and doubts that we experience in our daily lives. Unlike most of her other works, that involve a single photograph, Lee has taken two photographs as well as a video. The video features a performer making a strange noise, which is the phrase “it’s okay” cut into single syllables and being read as if she's singing. In an interview with CNN, Lee mentions that this work was one of the most memorable to her in that it was quite experimental.

== Influences ==
Lee sees her art as a mode of self-expression in that she portrays snippets of her own memories, dreams or anxieties in her work. She also draws inspiration from Korean fables and famous artworks.

Lee's creative combination of unusual plastic elements, as well as the expression of the unconscious mind, places her works at the very heart of Surrealism.

Her style is most comparable to German sculptor and photographer Thomas Demand, as well as U.S. installation artist and photographer Sandy Skoglund. It is unclear whether or not she was directly influenced by their works.

In an interview JeeYoung Lee mentions that some of her favorite artists include Kusama Yayoi, Tim Burton, and Michel Gondry.

== Exhibitions ==
Lee's first group exhibition took place in 2007, in her home country Korea. In addition to having her first solo exhibition in Korea in 2009, she branched out and had her first solo exhibitions abroad in 2014. She now holds exhibitions both group and solo around the world and has had exhibitions in Australia, USA, Taiwan, and Ireland.

== Collections ==
Lee's work is featured in the following collections:

- Osan Culture Foundation, Osan, Korea
- Kiyosato Museum of Photographic Arts, Kiyosato, Japan(2010)
- Incheon Foundation for Arts & Culture, Art Bank, Incheon, Korea
- OCI Museum of Art, Seoul, Korea
- CAN Foundation, Seoul, Korea
