= List of Korean women writers =

This is a partial list of Korean women writers.

== B ==
- Bae Suah (born 1965), novelist, short story writer
- Bak Solmay (born 1985), writer

== C ==
- Cheon Un-yeong (born 1971), novelist
- Choe Yun (born 1953), novelist
- Choi Eunmi (born 1978), novelist
- Choi Jeongrye (1955–2021), poet
- Chung Bora (born 1972), short story writer, novelist, translator

== E ==
- Eun Meehee (born 1960), novelist, columnist, educator

== G ==
- Goh Gyong-Sook (born 1972), children's book writer and illustrator
- Gong Ji-young (born 1963), novelist
- Gong Sun-ok (born 1963), novelist, short story writer

== H ==
- Ha Seong-nan (born 1967), short story writer, novelist
- Han Kang (born 1970), poet, novelist, winner of 2024 Nobel Prize in Literature
- Han Malsook (born 1931), novelist
- Han Moo-sook (1918–1993), novelist
- Hee Geum (1979)
- Heo Nanseolheon (1563–1589), prominent poet of the mid-Joseon dynasty
- Heo Su-gyeong (born 1964), poet
- Hong Yun-suk (1925–2015), acclaimed poet
- Lady Hyegyeong (1735–1816), crown princess and memoirist of the late-Joseon dynasty
- Hwang Boreum, novelist, essayist
- Hwang In-suk (born 1958), poet
- Hwang Sun-mi (born 1963), children's writer
- Hwang Jin-i (c. 1506–1560), poet, wrote in the sijo verse form
- Hwang Jung-eun (1967), author, podcaster
- Hyewon Yum (born 1976), children's book writer and illustrator
- Yun-I Hyeong (1967)

== I ==
- Im Yunjidang (1721–1793), scholar, philosopher, non-fiction writer

== J ==
- Jang Eun-jin (born 1976), novelist, short story writer
- Jon Kyongnin (born 1962), poet, novelist, focus on sexuality
- Jo Kyung-ran (born 1969), non-fiction writer
- Jung Eun-gwol, since 2004, novelist
- Jung Ihyun (born 1972), novelist
- Jung Mikyung (born 1960), novelist, short story writer
- June (Ju Eun) Hur (born 1989), author, novelist, YA Korean Historical Mystery, Edgar Awards winner for The Red Palace

== K ==
- Kang Kyeong-ae (1906–1944), novelist, poet, feminist
- Kang Sok-kyong (born 1951), novelist
- Kang Young-sook (born 1967), short story writer, novelist
- Kim Aeran (born 1980), short story writer, best selling novelist
- Kim Byeol-ah (born 1969), historical novelist
- Kim Chae-won (born 1946), short story writer, novelist
- Kim Chi-won (1943–2013), short story writer, novelist
- Kim Hu-ran (born 1934), poet, journalist
- Kang Hwa-gil (born 1986), gothic fiction and feminist writer
- Kim Hyesoon (born 1955), poet
- Kim Insuk (born 1963), novelist, short story writer
- Kim Ja-rim (1926–1994), playwright
- Kim Myeong-sun (1896–1951), novelist, short story writer, poet
- Kim Myŏngmi (born 1957), Korean-American poet
- Kim Nam-jo (1927–2023), poet
- Kim Ryeo-ryeong (born 1971), children's writer, novelist
- Kim Sagwa (born 1984), novelist, short story writer
- Kim Seon-wu (born 1970), feminist poet
- Kim Seung-hee (born 1952), poet, essayist, novelist
- Kwon Teckyoung, literary critic
- Kwon Yeo-sun (born 1965), novelist, short story writer

== L ==
- Lee Guem-yi (born 1962), children's and young adult writer
- Lee Hye-gyeong (1960–2026), novelist
- Lee Myung-ae (born 1976), children's book writer and illustrator
- Lee Ok-bong, 16th century poet
- Hayeon Lim (born 1993), socialite and author

== M ==
- Moon Chung-hee (born 1947), poet
- Moh Youn-sook (1910–1990), Korea's best-known female poet

== N ==
- Na Hye-sok (1896–1948), poet, feminist writer, painter, educator, journalist
- Noh Cheonmyeong (1912–1957), poet
- Noh In-kyung (born 1980), children's book writer and illustrator

== O ==
- Oh Jung-hee (born 1947), short story writer
- Oh Soo-yeon (born 1964), novelist, short story writer

== P ==
- Pak Hwasŏng (1904–1988), novelist, short story writer, essayist
- Park Kyung-ni (1926–2008), prominent novelist
- Park Wansuh (1931–2011), novelist

== R ==
- Ra Heeduk (born 1966), poet

== S ==
- Seo Hajin (born 1960), short story writer, novelist
- Shin Kyung-sook (born 1963), short story writer, novelist
- Sim Yunkyung (born 1972), popular novelist
- So Young-en (born 1943), short story writer
- Son Bo-mi (born 1980), novelist
- Son Sohui (1917–1987), novelist, short story writer

== U ==
- Uhwudong (c. 1440–1480) – poet and dancer known for her sijo verse

== Y ==
- Yang Gui-ja (born 1955), novelist
- Yeo Ok (from the ancient Gojoseon kingdom), author of the poem Gonghuin (A Medley for the Harp)
- Yi Bingheogak (fl.1809), published the women's encyclopaedia Guyhap chongseo
- Yi Geun-hwa (born 1976), poet, educator
- Yi Kyoung-ja (born 1948), short story writer, novelist
- Yoo An-jin (born 1941), poet, essayist, educator
- Yoo Eun-Sil (born 1974), children's writer
- Taeeun Yoo (fl 2000s), children's book writer and illustrator
- Yun Ko-eun (born 1980), novelist

== See also ==
- List of women writers
