= Roh (name) =

Roh is a given name or surname that is found in various languages.

== German ==
Roh is a German-language surname. It is derived from the word roh (meaning 'raw', figuratively referring to a rude person). There are 112 people with this surname in Germany, and there were 264 in Switzerland (as of 2015). Notable people with the surname include:

- Franz Roh (1890–1965), German historian, photographer and art critic
- Peter Roh (1811–1872), Swiss Jesuit preacher

== Czech ==
Roh is a Czech surname. It may be derived from the word roh (meaning 'horn') or the first name Roh. There were 144 people with this surname in the Czech Republic in 2016.

== Korean ==
- Roh
- Hangul: 노 (로)
- Hanja: 盧, 魯, 蘆, 路, 虜, 卢, 努
- Revised Romanization: No (Ro)
- McCune–Reischauer: No (Ro)

Family seal of the Gwangju Roh clan

Roh (노 in South Korea, 로 in North Korea), also transliterated as No, Noh, Ro or Lho, is a Korean surname. It derives from the Chinese surname Lu (surname 盧) or Lu (surname 魯). As of 2015, 315,372 people had this surname in South Korea. Undated figures from the National Institute of Korean Language state that, among people with the surname, 40.3% romanize it as Noh, 22% as No, and 16.2% as Roh. South Korean presidents Roh Moo-hyun and Roh Tae-woo chose to have their surnames written as Roh; Roh Tae-woo wanted to avoid the negative meaning of 'no' in English. The No/Noh romanization reflects the modern South Korean pronunciation of the surname, while the Ro/Roh romanization reflects its Chinese origin. Notable people with the surname include:

- Lho Shin-yong (1930–2019), South Korean politician
- No Byung-jun (born 1979), South Korean footballer
- No Min-woo (born 1986), Japanese-born South Korean actor and singer
- No Yeong-sik (born 1977), South Korean cyclist
- Noh Ah-reum (born 1991), South Korean speed skater
- Noh Cheonmyeong (1912–1957), South Korean poet
- Noh Do-hee (born 1995), South Korean speed skater
- Noh Do Young (born 1963), South Korean physicist
- Noh Haeng-ha (born 1990), South Korean actress
- Noh Haeng-seok (1988–2025), South Korean footballer
- Noh Hee-kyung (born 1966), South Korean television screenwriter and essayist
- Noh Heung-seop (born 1947), South Korean football player and manager
- Noh Hong-chul (born 1979), South Korean entertainer and entrepreneur
- Noh Hyeong-ouk (born 1962), South Korean activist and government official
- Noh Hyun-suk (born 1966), South Korean handball player
- Noh In-kyung (born 1980), South Korean author and illustrator
- Noh Jong-hyun (born 1993), South Korean actor
- Noh Jung-yoon (born 1971), South Korean footballer
- Noh Kyung-eun (born 1984), South Korean baseball player
- Noh Kyung-sun (born 1964), South Korean wrestler, Olympic medalist
- Noh Myeong-ja, known as Nora Noh, South Korean fashion designer
- Noh Sa-yeon (born 1957), South Korean singer and television personality
- Noh Sang-hyun (born 1990), Korean-American actor and model
- Noh Seon-yeong (born 1989), South Korean speed skater
- Noh Seung-yul (born 1991), South Korean golfer
- Noh Soo-jin (born 1962), South Korean footballer
- Noh Tae-won (born 1957), South Korean physicist
- Noh Woo-jin (born 1980), South Korean comedian
- Noh Woong-rae (born 1957), South Korean politician
- Noh Yoon-ho (born 1996), South Korean rapper
- Noh Young-hak (born 1993), South Korean actor
- Noh Young-min (born 1957), South Korean politician
- Roe Jung-hye (born 1957), South Korean biologist and professor
- Roh Deok (born 1980), South Korean film director and screenwriter
- Roh Gyeong-tae (born 1972), South Korean film producer, director and screenwriter
- Roh Hoe-chan (1956–2018), South Korean politician
- Roh Jae-hyun (1926–2019), South Korean general
- Roh Jae-won (born 1993), South Korean actor
- Roh Chol-min (born 1998), North Korean soldier
- Roh Jeong-eui (born 2001), South Korean actress
- Roh Ji-hoon (born 1990), South Korean singer and dancer
- Roh Ji-sun (born 1998), South Korean singer
- Roh Joo-hee (born 1983), South Korean swimmer
- Roh Joo-hyun (born 1946), South Korean actor
- Paul Roh Ki-nam, Korean Catholic bishop
- Roh Kyung-ho (born 2000), South Korean footballer
- Roh Moo-hyun (1946–2009), South Korean politician and lawyer, 9th President of South Korea
- Roh Sang-rae (born 1970), South Korean footballer
- Roh Soh-yeong (born 1961), South Korean business executive
- Roh Su-hui (born 1944), South Korean political activist
- Roh Tae-hyun (born 1993), South Korean singer and dancer
- Roh Tae-woo (1932–2021), South Korean politician and army general, 6th President of South Korea
- Roh Yoon-seo (born 2000), South Korean actress and model
- Roh Yu-na (born 2008), stage name A-na, South Korean singer

== Japanese ==
Roh is a Japanese reading of the Kanji 朗 used in names. Notable people with the name include:

- Roh Ogura (1916–1990), Japanese composer and writer
