= Lee Eun-mi =

Lee Eun-mi (Korean: 이은미) is a Korean name consisting of the family name Lee and the given name Eun-mi, and may also refer to:

- Lee Eun-mi (singer) (born 1966), South Korean singer
- Lee Eun-mi (footballer) (born 1988), South Korean footballer
- Lee Eun-mi, the main character in a North Korean propaganda film, referring to the mother of Kim Jong-un, Ko Yong-hui
