= Seung-min =

Name list

- Hangul: 승민
- RR: Seungmin
- MR: Sŭngmin
- IPA: [sɯŋmin]

Seung-min, also spelled Sung-min, is a Korean given name.

People with this name include:

- Yoo Seong-min (born 1958), South Korean male politician
- Oh Seung-min (born 1974), South Korean illustrator
- Ryu Seung-min (born 1982), South Korean male table tennis player
- Park Seung-min (born 1983), South Korean male football midfielder
- Seung Min Kim (born 1985), American female journalist
- Song Seung-min (born 1992), South Korean male football striker
- Baek Seung-min (born 1986), South Korean male football midfielder
- Hyun Seung-min (born 1999), South Korean actress
- Lee Seung-min (fl. 1990s), South Korean female taekwondo coach
- Kim Seung-min (born 2000), South Korean singer, a member of boy band Stray Kids

== See also ==
- List of Korean given names
