= Pocheon poisonings =

Serial murder case in South Korea

- Other name: Noh
- Conviction: Murder x3
- Penalty: Life imprisonment

Details
- Victims: 3
- Span of crimes: 2011–2014
- Country: South Korea
- State: Seoul Capital Area
- Date apprehended: February 2015

The Pocheon Poisonings were a series of murders committed in Pocheon, South Korea between 2011 and 2014. A woman, who was only identified as Noh, killed three family members using herbicides and left one in critical condition. She was sentenced to life imprisonment for her crimes.

== Murders ==
In 2011, Noh's ex-husband was poisoned with a lethal amount of herbicide. It was initially deemed a suicide, with an eyewitness statement claiming that he killed himself after drinking a poisoned glass of water. Three years later, both the mother-in-law and husband, who suffered from lung diseases, died. Herbicides had been added to a fatigue-relieving drink for the mother-in-law, while the husband died after being slowly poisoned over a long period of time. Then, in February 2015, Noh was arrested. Even more shockingly, she tried to also poison her daughter, who suffered from lung fibrosis.

== Trial and sentence ==
Noh, who killed her relatives for money, was indicted by the court in 2015, with the prosecutors asking that she be given the maximum penalty available. At her first trial, she was sentenced to 10 years imprisonment and was required to wear an electronic bracelet. In her appeal trial, she was resentenced to life imprisonment.

== See also ==
- List of serial killers by country
