= Kim Dongni =

South Korean writer (1913–1995)

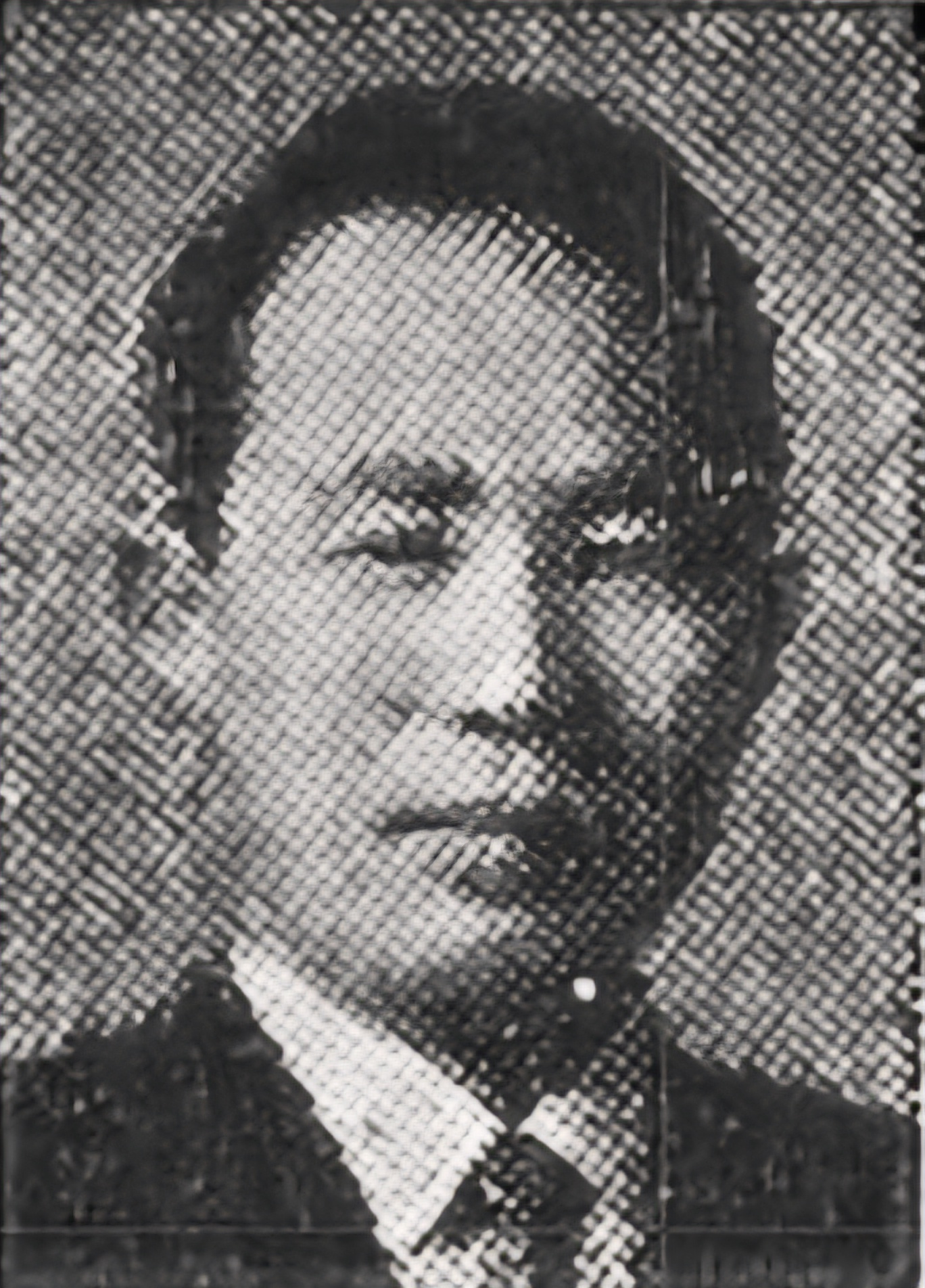
- Born: 김동리; 24 November 1913; Keishū, Keishōhoku-dō, Korea, Empire of Japan (today Gyeongju, North Gyeongsang Province, South Korea)
- Died: 17 June 1995; Seoul
- Citizenship: South Korean
- Spouse: Son Sohui
- Writing career
- Language: Korean

Korean name
- Hangul: 김창귀
- Hanja: 金昌貴
- RR: Gim Changgwi
- MR: Kim Ch'anggwi

Art name
- Hangul: 김동리
- Hanja: 金東里
- RR: Gim Dongri
- MR: Kim Tongni

Courtesy name
- Hangul: 김시종
- Hanja: 金始鐘
- RR: Gim Sijong
- MR: Kim Sijong

Kim Dongni (Korean: 김동리; 24 November 1913 – 17 June 1995), also sometimes Gim Dongli, was a South Korean writer.

== Life ==
Kim Dongni, born Kim Sijong on 24 November 1913, in Gyeongju, Keishōhoku-dō, Korea, Empire of Japan, was a well-known Korean short-story writer and poet. Kim Dongni attended Gyeseong Middle School in Daegu before transferring to Kyungshin Middle School in Keijō. After family circumstances forced him to drop out, he devoted himself to reading in place of regular coursework. He read a tremendous number of books, including philosophy, world literature and Eastern classics. Kim's eldest brother, Kim Beombu, a scholar of Chinese classics and a philosopher, had great influence on Kim's extensive reading and his prospects of becoming a writer of Korean literature.

Kim Dongni's family was so poor during his childhood that he considered hunger to be a constant part of his life. He once wrote that sometimes, if there was any liquor remaining in the bowl after his father drank from it, he would drink the leftover liquor to relieve his hunger. In 1928 he dropped out of school in order to devote himself to writing. He began his literary career by publishing several poems in various newspapers when he was only sixteen, and quickly made a name for himself in the Korean literary world with his short stories. Kim Dongni formally debuted as a poet in 1934 with the publication of the poem "White Heron" (Baengno) in the Chosun Ilbo, and emerged as a fiction writer the next year when his story "A Descendant of Hwarang" (Hwarangui huye) was published in the JoongAng Ilbo. He received numerous literary awards and recognitions throughout his career, and was also active in a number of organizations, including the Association of Young Korean Writers (Hahngoog cheongnyeon munhakga hyeophoe), the Korea Academy of Arts (Daehahnmin-goog yesurwon), and the Korean Writers' Association (Hahngoog munin hyeophoe).

Kim Dongni married Kim Wol-gye (김월계) in 1939; the pair divorced in 1948. He then married fellow writer Son Sohui in 1953, and they remained married until her death in 1987, at which point he married Seo Yeong-eun (서영은) the same year. He died on 17 June 1995.

== Work ==
Kim's work deals with traditional and native Korean themes from a 20th-century perspective. As a right-wing writer and advocate of "pure literature", Kim Dongri produced a series of critical essays opposing ideological literature, including The True Meaning of Pure Literature (Sunsu munhagui jinui, 1946) and The Theory of National Literature (Minjok munhangnon, 1948).

Gim Dongli's literary world, characterized by a mixture of traditional mysticism and humanist realism, investigated the idea of fate and man's place in the universe through the spiritual world of Korean tradition as it collided with foreign culture. His early works such as "The Portrait of Shaman" (Munyeodo, 1936), "The Post Horse Curse" (Yeongma), and "The Legend of Yellow Earth" (Hwangtogi) draw heavily on elements of traditional myth to explore the relations between shamanism and Confucianism, Christianity and Buddhism, fatalism and naturalism. "The Post Horse Curse" portrays a man's rebellion against and eventual acceptance of his fate as a wanderer; "The Portrait of Shaman," which was later expanded into a full-length novel entitled Eulhwa, depicts a conflict between a shaman mother and a Christian son. In the mother's suicide, the narrative predicts the decline of shamanism and ascendancy of newly imported Christianity.

After the Korean War, Gim Dongli expanded his thematic concerns to include political clashes and the resultant suffering of people during the Korean War. "Heungnam evacuation" (Heungnam cheolsoo), based on the actual event of the UN forces' retreat from the city of Heungnam during the War, delves into the conflict between democracy and communism. "Dance of Existence" (Siljonmoo) narrates a love story between a North Korean man and a South Korean woman that comes to an abrupt end when the man's wife from North Korea reappears. Apparent in these stories is the author's attempt to universalize elements of Korean tradition and spiritual identity by transposing them onto a contemporary reality. "The Cross of Shaphan" (Sabanui sipjaga, 1957), a fictional account of a man crucified next to Jesus, combines the subject of political strife with fatalistic attitude and critique of Western culture. In lieu of the otherworldly and removed God presented in "The Cross of Shaphan," "A Life-sized Figure of the Buddha" (Deungsin-bul) suggests an image of God who embraces human suffering.

Some of Kim's short stories were translated into English and published in the volume Loess Valley. The short story "Loess Valley" could be read as a parable for the crippling effect China has had on Korea in which a Chinese general "assassinates" a local mountain to ensure that no local Hercules can ever threaten China, but mainly it seems to be about two strong, sort of wife-swapping drunken Korean louts. Full of violence, it is an interesting story to read, but not one that leaves much of an impact. In "The Tableau of the Shaman Sorceress" is a Shaman who lives with her deaf and mute daughter. The daughter is re-united with her son who is now a Christian, and they fight for religious supremacy, with tragic results. Like "Loess Valley," it is long on trauma and violence. As in most cases with Kim, it ends in warfare. "The Rock" and "Two Reservists" (귀환장정) are short, the first another tragic family story (featuring yet again an attempted murder), and the second about how a sense of family (including both love and loathing, but at least the violence is kept down to a mugging) grows between two reservists, both released from the army. The next two stories, Kim's last, Cry of the Magpies and Deungshi-bul, were later released by KLTI and Jimoondang, and can be found and with reviews, elsewhere

== Awards ==
- Freedom Literature Prize (1955)
- Korean Academy of Arts Prize (1958)
- Citizens' Order of the Republic of Korea (1958)
- Samil Prize (1967)
- Seoul City Literature Award (1970)
- Order of Civil Merit, Peony Medal (1970)
- 5.16 People's Literature Award (1983)
- Korean Arts Council Selection Shining 20th Century Artist (1999)

== Works in Translation ==
=== Ulhwa ===
- The Shaman Sorceress - English
- ULHWA the Shaman - English
- ULHWA, la exorcista - Spanish
- Ulhwa, die schamanin - German
- 乙火 - Chinese
- La Chamane - French

=== Saban-ui sipjaga ===
- The Cross of Shaphan - English
- La Croix de Schaphan - French

=== Short Stories ===
- A Descendant of the Hwarang in A Ready-made Life: Early Masters of Modern Korean Fiction
- Greedy Youth in Collected Short Stories from Korea

== Works in Korean (Partial) ==
- A Descendant of the Hwarang (Hwarangui huye)
- The Rock (Bawi)
- Seondo Mountain (Seondosan)
- Seomun Street (Seomun geori)
- Portrait of a Shaman (Munyeodo 1936)
- Loess Valley (Hwangtogi 1939)
- The Cross of Shaphan (Sabanui sipjaga 1955)

== See also ==
- Korean literature
- List of Korean novelists
