= Libraries in Paris =

Cultural hubs with rich literary collections

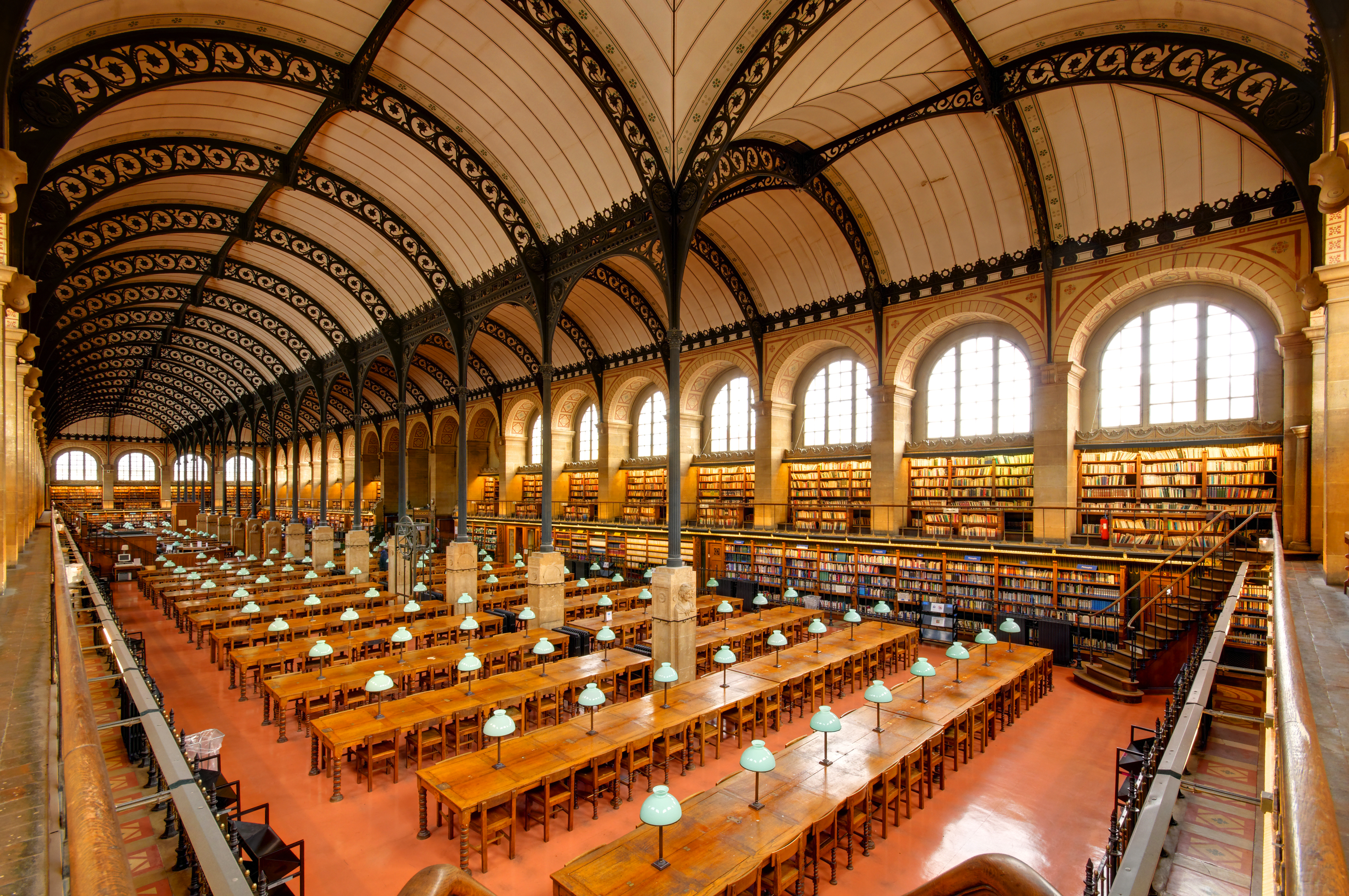
Sainte-Geneviève Library at Sorbonne-Nouvelle University

Paris, the capital of France, has many of the country's most important libraries. The Bibliothèque nationale de France (BnF; in English "national library of France") operates public libraries in Paris, among them the François-Mitterrand, Richelieu, Louvois, Opéra, and Arsenal.

== Overview ==
In the 2nd arrondissement, the Bibliothèque Richelieu is to a design by Henri Labrouste with nine domes; it opened in 1868. There are three public libraries in the 4th arrondissement. The Bibliothèque Forney, in the Le Marais district, is dedicated to the decorative arts; the Arsenal Library occupies a former military building, and has a large collection on French literature; and the Bibliothèque historique de la ville de Paris, also in Le Marais, contains the Paris historical research service. The Bibliothèque Sainte-Geneviève at Sorbonne-Nouvelle University is in 5th arrondissement; designed by Henri Labrouste and built in the mid-1800s, it contains a rare book and manuscript division. The Saint-Germain-des-Prés Library at Université Paris Cité is associated with the national public library as a mixed service unit in the Latin Quarter. Situated in the 6th arrondissement, Bibliothèque Mazarine is the oldest public library in France. The Médiathèque Musicale Mahler in the 8th arrondissement opened in 1986 and contains collections related to music. The Bibliothèque François-Mitterrand (nicknamed Très Grande Bibliothèque i.e. very large library; and part of the BnF) in the 13th arrondissement was completed in 1994 to a design of Dominique Perrault and contains four glass towers. In the same arrondissement, Bibliothèque Marguerite Durand opened in 1931 and holds a collection on feminism. The children's library, Petite Bibliothèque Ronde, opened in 1965.

There are several academic libraries and archives in Paris. The Sorbonne Library at Panthéon-Sorbonne University in the 5th arrondissement is the largest university library in Paris. In addition to the library on the Sorbonne site, the other university bearing the same name, Sorbonne University, also has several humanities libraries throughout Paris with its Sorbonne University Library: the Malesherbes Library, the Clignancourt Library, the Michelet Library-Institut d'Art et d'Archéologie, the Serpente Library, and Institut des Etudes Ibériques. Situated in the 7th arrondissement, The American Library in Paris opened on 20 May 1920 and is part of a private, non-profit organisation. It originated from cases of books sent by the American Library Association to U.S. soldiers in France. Other academic libraries include Interuniversity Library of Health at Université Paris Cité, Paris School of Mines Library. Opened in 2009, the Sainte-Barbe Library at Sorbonne Nouvelle University is an inter-university library located in the buildings of the former College of St. Barbara.

== See also ==
- Municipal libraries of Paris
- List of libraries in France
