= Yoo Eun-Sil =

South Korean Writer

- Born: Seoul, South Korea
- Occupation: Author
- Writing career
- Language: Korean
- Genres: Picture book, Children's Literature

Yoo Eun-Sil (Korean: 유은실) is a South Korean author of children's literature, active since 2004. Her major works include My Teacher Lindgren and Lee Yujeong the Perfect, and her work ranges from young adult novels and picture books to collections of short stories. She was nominated in 2023 as the Korean candidate for the 2024 Astrid Lindgren Memorial Award.

== Career ==
Yoo Eun-Sil was born in 1974 in Seoul, South Korea. She lived in Doksan-dong, a neighborhood on the outskirts of Seoul. She published her first children's novel in 2005, Granny Mago Came to My House. In 2010, Lee Yujeong the Perfect was selected for the IBBY Honour List.

Her other major works include My Teacher Lindgren, The Last Event, Sunrye House, and the I Wanna series. Her young adult novels include Outskirts, Two Meters and 48 Hours, and Sunrye House, while her picture books include The Year's Autumn, My Doksan-dong, Calf Poo, and Matryoshka. She has also published collections of short stories including The Flags of All Nations Boy and Lee Yujeong the Perfect. Her children's fiction includes The Last Event and The Birth of Ilsoo.

== Awards and nominations ==
- 2010 IBBY Honor List – Lee Yujeong the Perfect
- 2023 Nominated as the Korean candidate for the 2024 Astrid Lindgren Memorial Award

== Works ==
- 2021 Sunrye House (BIR) ISBN 9788954691529
- 2018 Two Meters and 48 Hours (Naznsan Books) ISBN 9791155251096
- 2014 Outskirts (Munhakdongne) ISBN 9788954691529

== Collaborations with other illustrators ==
- 2022 Matryoshka by Kim Ji-hyon (Sakyejul) ISBN 9791160949681
- 2022 I Will Remember by Kim Yu-dae (Sakyejul) ISBN 9791160949322
- 2022 I Will Hesitate by Kim Yu-dae (Sakyejul) ISBN 9791160949766
- 2022 I Wanna Do It My Way by Kim Yu-dae (Sakyejul) ISBN 9791169811057
- 2022 May I Forge by Gyeong Hae-won (Changbi Publishers, Inc.) ISBN 9788936414160
- 2021 Park Wan-suh by Lee Yoon-hui (BIR) ISBN 9788949129419
- 2019 My Doksan-dong by Oh Seung-min (Moonji) ISBN 9788932035451
- 2019 Calf Poo by Park Sae-yeong (Changbi Publishers, Inc.) ISBN 9788936447526
- 2018 The Year's Autumn by Kim Jae-hong (Changbi Publishers, Inc.) ISBN 9788936455330
- 2016 Dream House by Seo Yeongah (Moonji) ISBN 9788932028934
- 2015 Wanna Come to Our Town Library? by Shin Min-jae (Sakyejul) ISBN 9788958289128
- 2014 Jane Goodall by Seo Yeong-ah (BIR) ISBN 9788949188553
- 2013 I Wanna Be Sensitive Too by Kim Yu-dae (Sakyejul) ISBN 9788958286622
- 2013 The Birth of Ilsoo by Seo Hyeon (BIR) ISBN 9788949121543
  - 2016 我只想做个平凡的孩子(浙江文艺出版社) China, ISBN 9787533944650
- 2012 The Smell of Sunshine on My Head by Lee Hyeon-joo (BIR) ISBN 9788949161587
- 2011 I Wanna Be a Picky Eater Too by Seol Eun-yeong (Sakyejul) ISBN 9788958285366
- 2010 Yu Gwansun by Gwak Seong-hwa (BIR) ISBN 9788949188317
- 2010 The Story of Simchung by Hong Seong-ju (BIR) ISBN 9788949101279
- 2010 Mija from Our Town by Chang Gyeong-hye (Naznsan Books) ISBN 9788989646600
- 2010 The Last Event by Kang Gyeong-su (Baram Books, revised BIR edition, 2015.) ISBN 9788949121642
  - 2020 爷爷最后的秘密(Zhejiang Literature & Art Publishing Hous) China, ISBN 9787533959937
  - 2014 Le dernier événement(Ecole Des Loisirs) France, ISBN 9782211213509
- 2008 Lee Yujeong, the Perfect by Byun Youngmee (Prunsoop Publishing) ISBN 9788971846278
- 2007 The Flags of All Nations Boy by Jeong Seong-hwa (Changbi Publishers, Inc.) ISBN 9788936442323
- 2005 My Teacher, Lindgren by Gwon Sa-wu (Changbi Publishers, Inc.) ISBN 9788936442194
  - 2014 爱顶嘴的 小女孩儿(China Machine Press) China, ISBN 9787111436539
  - 2010 Si j'étais Fifi Brindacier(Editions Philippe Picquier) France, ISBN 9782809701463
- 2005 Grandma Mago Comes to Our House by Baek Dae-seung (Baram books, republished Prunsoop Publishing, 2015) ISBN 9791156750505
