= Kang Young-sook =

South Korean novelist (born 1967)

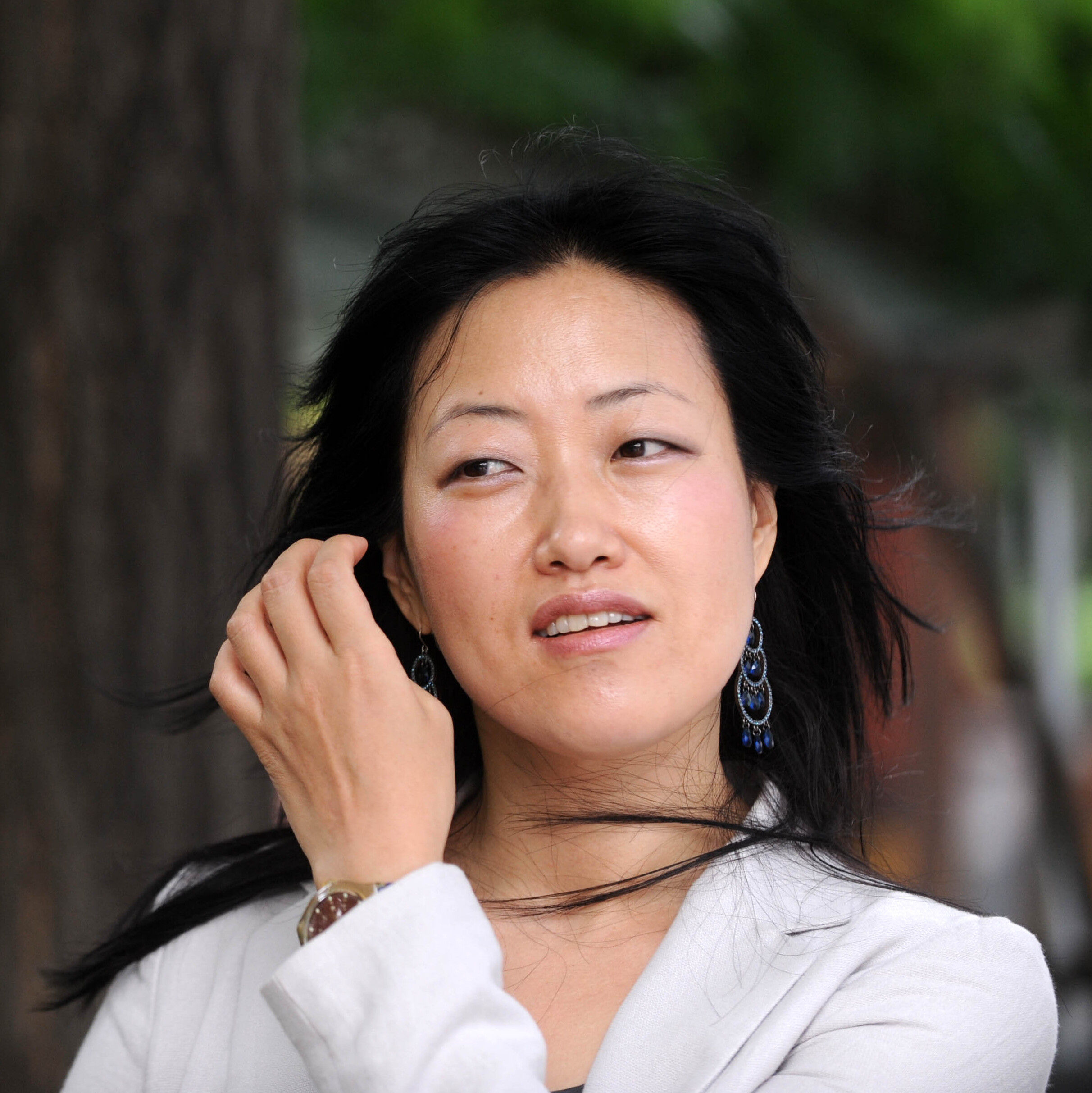
- Kang in 2009
- Born: Chuncheon, South Korea
- Citizenship: South Korean
- Education: Seoul Institute of the Arts
- Occupation: Writer
- Writing career
- Language: Korean
- Genres: Fiction, Urban Noir, Fantasy, Climate Fiction
- Notable works: Rina, Burim district BunkerX

- Korean name
- Hangul: 강영숙
- Hanja: 姜英淑
- RR: Gang Yeongsuk
- MR: Kang Yŏngsuk

Kang Young-sook (Korean: 강영숙; born 1967) is a South Korean novelist.

== Life and career ==
Kang Young-sook was born in 1967 in Chuncheon, Gangwon Province in South Korea and spent most of her childhood there. She was student athlete for volleyball, long jump, and other sports, before she moved to Seoul when she was 14. She majored creative writing at the Seoul Institute of the Arts. She was the editor in chief of the Seoul Institute of the Arts journal and in 1998 made her literary debut with the short story "A Meal in August" through the annual spring literary competition sponsored by the Seoul Shinmun. Her published debut was the short story collection ['Shaken'] in (2002) and she has also published "Every Day is a Celebration" (2004) and "Black in Red" (2009). Her full-length novel Rina (2006) was serialized in the quarterly Literary Joongang. Kang participated in the Seoul Young Writers’ Festival and the East Asia Literature Forum in 2008. Since 1990, Kang has served as an advisory member of the Korea Dialogue Academy which is involved in various social campaigns including the Christian social movement, environmental activism, and encouraging discussions between different religions. In 2009, Kang did a guest residency at the International Writing Program of University of Iowa.

== Work ==
The Literature Translation Institute of Korea summarizes Kang's work as follows:

Her first story collection Shaken (Munhakdongne Publishing, 2002) attracted attention for capturing the female consciousness with grotesque imagination. Her second collection Every Day Is a Celebration (Changbi Publishing, 2004) dealt with the existential issues of life in a capitalist society from a broader social perspective. Her third collection Black in Red (Munhakdongne Publishing, 2009), depicts in a cool, understated tone the way in which people of the modern society come to meet and understand one another. Her fourth collection At Night He Lifts Weights(Changbi Publishing, 2011) is strongly colored by urban noir. The stories embody the anxiety of suffering city dwellers in mundane locales damaged by natural disasters. One of the stories in this collection, From Mullae won the Kim You-jeong Literary Award in 2011. The story portrays contrasting images of a female narrator living in a provincial city affected by foot-and-mouth diseases and a young artist living in a major city.

Kang's full-length of novel, Rina, the novel begins with a scene in which twenty-two refugees cross the border. They all escape with the hope of finding a Utopia in the land of P. What awaits Rina, however, is a chemical plant in the mountains, a desert-like field of salt, an isolated village, Siring, a town of prostitutes, and a large-scale industrial complex. Rina makes desperate efforts to settle down wherever she goes, but there is no place for her to stay. The journey of Rina, in which she crosses paths with all kinds of vulgar people, whose business it is to murder and rape, and deal in human trafficking, drugs, and prostitution, is described in a unique tone of black humor, it is difficult to tell reality from illusion in this novel. In the end, Rina goes in the direction of another border, not the land of P, demonstrating the time-old struggle between nations, or borders, and humans.

== Select translated works ==
- リナ, 吉川ナギ(Yoshikawa Nagi, translator), 現代企畵室(Gendaikikakushitsu), 東京(Tokyo), Japan, 2011. ISBN 978-4-7738-1113-1
- Truck, Jeon Seung-hee(translator), David William Hong(editor), Bi-Lingual Edition Modern Korean Literature, Seoul, Korea, 2014. ISBN 979-11-5662-019-8
- Rina, Kim Boram(translator), Library of Korean Literature, Dalkey Archive Press, Texas, US, 2015. ISBN 978-1628971156
- ライティングクラブ(Writing Club), 文茶影(Moon Chakage, translator),現代企畵室(Gendaikikakushitsu), 東京(Tokyo), Japan, 2017. ISBN 978-4-7738-1717-1

== Awards ==
- 2011 Kim Yu-Jeong Award
- 2011 [Baek Shin-Ae Literature Award]
- 2006 Hankook Ilbo Literary Award
- 2017 [Lee Hyo-seok Literary Award]

== See also ==
- List of Korean women writers
- List of Korean novelists
