= Kim Myeong-sun =

Korean writer (1896–1951)

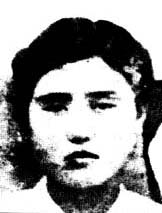
- Born: 20 January 1896; Pyongyang, Joseon
- Died: 22 June 1951 (aged 55)
- Writing career
- Language: Korean
- Notable work: Chilmyeonjo
- Movement: Feminism

- Kim Myeong-sun
- Hangul: 김명순
- Hanja: 金明淳
- RR: Gim Myeongsun
- MR: Kim Myŏngsun

Art name
- Hangul: 탄실
- Hanja: 彈實
- RR: Tansil
- MR: T'ansil

Kim Myeong-sun (Korean: 김명순; Hanja: 金明淳; 20 January 1896 – 22 June 1951) was a female Korean novelist and poet of the early 20th century. She wrote under the art names Tansil (탄실; 彈實) and Mangyangcho (망양초; 望洋草).

== Life ==
Kim Myeong-sun was born in Pyongyang, Joseon in 1896. Kim attended Chinmyeong Girls' School in Seoul in 1908 where she was considered a good student, but she was bullied due to her mother's status as a kisaeng. She was also mistreated by her step-mother's family, leading her to drop out of school in 1911. In 1913, she went to Tokyo to study at Kojimachi's Girls' School, but did not complete her studies there. She soon returned to Korea to earn her degree at Sungmyeon's Girls' School.

In 1919, she joined the Creation group, Korea's first literary circle, which was organized by Kim Dong-in and other Korean students in Tokyo. She briefly worked as a reporter for the newspaper Maeil Sinmun, and from 1927 to 1930 she worked in film. She then suffered from financial problems and succumbed to mental illness late in life.

== Work ==
Kim made her literary debut in 1917, in a magazine edited by Ch'oe Namsŏn called Youth (소년; Sonyŏn), with a novella titled Mysterious Girl (의문의 소녀; Ŭimunŭi sonyŏ) She began publishing her poetry in 1921, and became known for her keen psychological portraits, with her 1921 novella Turkey (칠면조; Ch'ilmyŏnjo), which was published in the magazine Enlightenment (개벽; Kaebyŏk). She continued publishing as late as 1925.

Relatively little is currently known about her work because, as Kim Yung-Hee notes, scholars have not studied her and are currently "attempting to excavate her lost works in order to better assess her position in the lineage of modern Korean women fiction writers."

== Works ==
=== Translated into English ===
- A Girl of Mystery, in Questioning Minds (University of Hawaii Press, 2009) ISBN 978-0-824-83409-8
- Collected Works of the First Korean Female Writer Kim Myeong-sun (BookLab, 2022) ISBN 979-11-6836-249-9

=== In Korean ===
- Dubious Girl (의문의 소녀), 1917
- Turkey (칠면조; 七面鳥), 1921
- Lonely People (외로운 사람들), 1924
- When I Look Back (돌아다 볼 때), 1924
- Tansil and Juyeong (탄실이와 주영이), 1924
- Night of Burning (뭇는 날 밤), 1925
- The Vault of Heaven (창궁; 蒼穹), 1925
- The Guest (손님), 1926
- I Love (나는 사랑한다), 1926
- Like a Stranger (모르는 사람갓치), 1929

== See also ==
- Korean literature
- List of Korean-language poets
- List of Korean female writers
