= Kim Jin-kyung (author) =

South Korean illustrator (born 1958)

- Born: 1953 (age 72–73); Dangjin, Chungcheongnam-do, South Korea
- Occupations: Novelist, children's book author, poet
- Writing career
- Language: Korean
- Genres: Young adult fiction, children's literature
- Notable works: Cat School, Mirror Wars, Shadow Wars, To the Magpie Who Believes Itself to be a Pigeon, The Carpenters' Wars

Kim Jin-kyung (김진경; born 1953) is a South Korean author of children's and young adult literature. He started writing books for children in 1997, and is considered a pioneer of Korean fantasy. His best-known work is Cat School, the first Korean fantasy series for children. The series is vast, comprising 11 volumes in 3 parts, and won Le Prix des Incorruptibles in 2006. His books build on motifs derived from myths and fairy tales. He also tackles sensitive social issues such as education and human rights in his works of fantasy. He was nominated as the Korean candidate for the Hans Christian Andersen Award in 2014.

== Life ==
Kim Jin-kyung was born in Dangjin, Chungcheongnam-do, in 1953. After graduating from Daejeon High School in 1971, he went on to Seoul National University’s Department of Korean Language Education. He received the Newcomer of the Year Award for poetry from the magazine Korean Literature in 1974. After graduating from university, he taught Korean in schools. He began to pursue an active career as an author of fairy tales such as Cat School from 2000. Kim served as a Secretary of Education and Culture to the Blue House in 2005 and 2006. In 2018, while serving as the chairman of the National Education Council, he was involved in major education policies in Korea.

== Career ==
Kim Jin-kyung debuted as a poet by receiving the Newcomer of the Year Award for poetry from the magazine Korean Literature in 1974. He started writing fairy tales in the 1990s while participating in the Creators’ Association for Educational Literature, a fairy tale study group. He became the first Korean to win the French children's literature award, the 17th Le Prix des Incorruptibles, for Cat School, which was published in 2001. The series has been published in translation in France, China, Taiwan, and Japan. The Shadow Wars series was simultaneously published in France and Korea. He was nominated as the Korean candidate for the Hans Christian Andersen Award in 2014.

== Awards ==
- 2014 Korean candidate for the Hans Christian Andersen Award
- 2006 Winner of the Le Prix des Incorruptibles, a French children's literature award – Cat School Series
- 2004 Korea Children's Book Award for Mirror Wars
- 1974 Newcomer of the Year in Poetry, Korean Literature

== Works ==
- 2012 Viewing the World Through Myths with Kim Jin-kyung: Changing the Way We Think (Jaeum & Moeum) ISBN 9788957076729
- 2011 Shadow Wars 3 (Munhakdongne) ISBN 9788954615945
- 2011 Shadow Wars 2 (Munhakdongne) ISBN 9788954615938
- 2011 Shadow Wars 1 (Munhakdongne) ISBN 9788954615921
- 2009 Our Beautiful Country (Munhakdongne) ISBN 9788954607223
- 2008 Goodbye Mr. Hapless (Munhakdongne) ISBN 9788954606226
- 2005 Rebellion from the Future: Essays on Education by Kim Jin-kyung (Prunsoop) ISBN 9788971844267
- 2004 Hours of the Earth (Poems by Kim Jin-kyung) (Silcheon Munhak) ISBN 9788939204836
- 2001 The Children of Galmunri (Poems by Kim Jin-kyung) (Munhakdongne) ISBN 9788982813535
- 2000 The Power of Sorrow: Poems by Kim Jin-kyung (Munhakdongne) ISBN 9788982818158
- 1998 The Story of the Ginkgo Tree (Munhakdongne) ISBN 9788982811180
- 1998 The Wolf (Silcheon Munhak) ISBN 9788939203389
- 1996 Sleeping in the Starlight (Poems by Kim Jin-kyung) (Changbi) ISBN 9788936421434
- 1988 To the Magpie Who Believes Itself to be a Pigeon (Purunnamu) ISBN 9788964460993
- 1987 A Jesus for Our Times (Silcheon Munhak) ISBN 6000033222

== Collaborations with other Writer and Illustrator ==
- 2016 The Witch of Blonew Forest 2 – Cat School Paris episode with Kim Jae-hong (Munhakdongne) ISBN 9788954639071
  - 2016 LA SORCIERE ET LE JARDIN SECRET 2 (Pilippe picquier, France) ISBN 9782809711998
- 2016 The Witch of Blonew Forest 1 – Cat School Paris episode with Kim Jae-hong (Munhakdongne) ISBN 9788954639064
  - 2016 LA SORCIERE ET LE JARDIN SECRET 1 (Pilippe picquier, France) ISBN 9782809711608
- 2015 Sorry, Grandpa (ThinkRoad) ISBN 9788965133537
- 2014 Talking to Ghosts (Proposal for a New Educational Ecosystem) (Munhakdongne) ISBN 9788954625616
- 2014 The Secret of Angkor Wat 3 – Cat School The World episode with Kim Jae-hong (Munhakdongne) ISBN 978-89-546-2423-7
  - 2015 ECOLE DES CHATS A ANGKOR 3 – L'AME DE CRISTAL (Pilippe picquier, France) ISBN 9782809711080
- 2013 The Secret of Angkor Wat 2 – Cat School The World episode with Kim Jae-hong (Munhakdongne) ISBN 978-89-546-2359-9
  - 2015 ECOLE DES CHATS A ANGKOR 2 – LES CLONES D'APOPHIS (Pilippe picquier, France) ISBN 9782809710892
- 2013 The Secret of Angkor Wat 1 – Cat School The World episode with Kim Jae-hong (Munhakdongne) ISBN 978-89-546-2358-2
  - 2015 ECOLE DES CHATS A ANGKOR 1 – LE SECRET D'ANGKOR (Pilippe picquier, France) ISBN 9782809710403
- 2011 A Bowl of Rice at a Buddhist Temple (Ttran) ISBN 9788990840202
- 2010 Conversations With Titans of Literature (JoongAng Books) ISBN 9788961887502
- 2007 Cat School 2 vol.3 – White Starfish with Kim Jae-hong (Munhakdongne) ISBN 978-89-546-3207-2
  - 2008 NOUVELLES AVENTURES DE L'ECOLE DES CHATS 3 – BULGASSARI (Pilippe picquier, France) ISBN 9782809700190
- 2007 Cat School 2 vol.2 – The Secret of the Golden Crown with Kim Jae-hong (Munhakdongne) ISBN 978-89-546-3206-5
  - 2008 NOUVELLES AVENTURES DE L'ECOLE DES CHATS 2 – SECRET DE LA (Pilippe picquier, France) ISBN 9782809700138
- 2007 Cat School 2 vol.1 – The guardian of the sun's sword with Kim Jae-hong (Munhakdongne) ISBN 978-89-546-3205-8
  - 2007 NOUVELLES AVENTURES DE L'ECOLE DES CHATS 1 – DEFENSEURS (Pilippe picquier, France) ISBN 9782877309738
- 2007 Landscape with a Bicycle (Morning Dew) ISBN 9788988996720
- 2003 Mirror Wars (Munhakdongne) with Kim Jae-hong ISBN 9788982817083
  - 2010 DERNIERES AVENTURES DE L'ECOLE DES CHATS 3 – PLAINE (Pilippe picquier, France) ISBN 9782809701739
  - 2009 DERNIERES AVENTURES DE L'ECOLE DES CHATS 2 – PIERRES (Pilippe picquier, France) ISBN 9782809701210
  - 2009 DERNIERES AVENTURES DE L'ECOLE DES CHATS 1 – MIROIR (Pilippe picquier, France) ISBN 9782809701043
- 2002 Cat School 5 – Mountain of the Soul with Kim Jae-hong (Munhakdongne) ISBN 978-89-546-8636-5
  - 2006 L'ECOLE DES CHATS 5 – MONTAGNE DES AMES (Pilippe picquier, France) ISBN 9782877309066
- 2001 Cat School 4 – I'll be in your eyes with Kim Jae-hong (Munhakdongne) ISBN 978-89-546-8635-8
  - 2006 L'ECOLE DES CHATS 4 – JE TE SAUVERAI DES TENEBRES (Pilippe picquier, France) ISBN 9782877308786
- 2001 Cat School 3 – Prophecy Started with Kim Jae-hong (Munhakdongne) ISBN 978-89-546-8634-1
- 2001 Cat School 2 – Magical Gift with Kim Jae-hong (Munhakdongne) ISBN 978-89-546-2670-5
- 2001 Cat School 1 – The Secret of the Crystal Cave with Kim Jae-hong (Munhakdongne) ISBN 978-89-546-8632-7
  - 2006 L'ECOLE DES CHATS – VOLUMES 1, 2 ET 3 (Pilippe picquier, France) ISBN 9782877309769
- 2000 The Carpenters’ War (Munhakdongne) – Illustrated by Choi Dalsoo ISBN 9788982812750
