= Okcheon County =

County in North Chungcheong Province, South Korea

Coordinates: 36°18′03″N 127°34′07″E

Okcheon
- County
- Panoramic view of Okcheon-eup

- Flag Emblem

- Location in South Korea
- Country: South Korea
- Region: Hoseo
- Administrative divisions: 1 eup, 8 myeon

Area
  - Total: 537.13 km^{2} (207.39 sq mi)

Population (2004)
  - Total: 56,634
  - Density: 114/km^{2} (300/sq mi)
  - Dialect: Chungcheong

Korean name
- Hangul: 옥천군
- Hanja: 沃川郡
- RR: Okcheon-gun
- MR: Okch'ŏn-gun

Okcheon County (Korean: 옥천군) is a county in North Chungcheong Province, South Korea.

== History ==
Okcheon has been called by various names such as Gosisan-gun, Kwansung, and Hyeonryeong.

=== Timeline ===
- King Gyeongdeok: It was named Gwanseong-gun
- King Hyeonjong: It was included in Seong-ju, Kyeongsan-bu
- King Chungseon: It was named Okju

=== Joseon ===
In 1413, King Taejong of the Joseon Dynasty named it Okcheon and transferred the jurisdiction of the province from Gyeongsang Province to Chungcheong Province. In 1895, the 26th King Gojong's national administrative adjustment took place and named it Okcheon-gun.

== Administrative divisions ==
Okcheon-gun is divided into one eup and eight myeon:

- Okcheon-eup
- Dongi-myeon
- Annam-myeon
- Annae-myeon
- Cheongseong-myeon
- Cheongsan-myeon
- Iwon-myeon
- Gunseo-myeon
- Gunbuk-myeon

== Nature ==
=== River ===
The national river Geumgang flows, and 198 small rivers flow in the county.

== Transportation ==
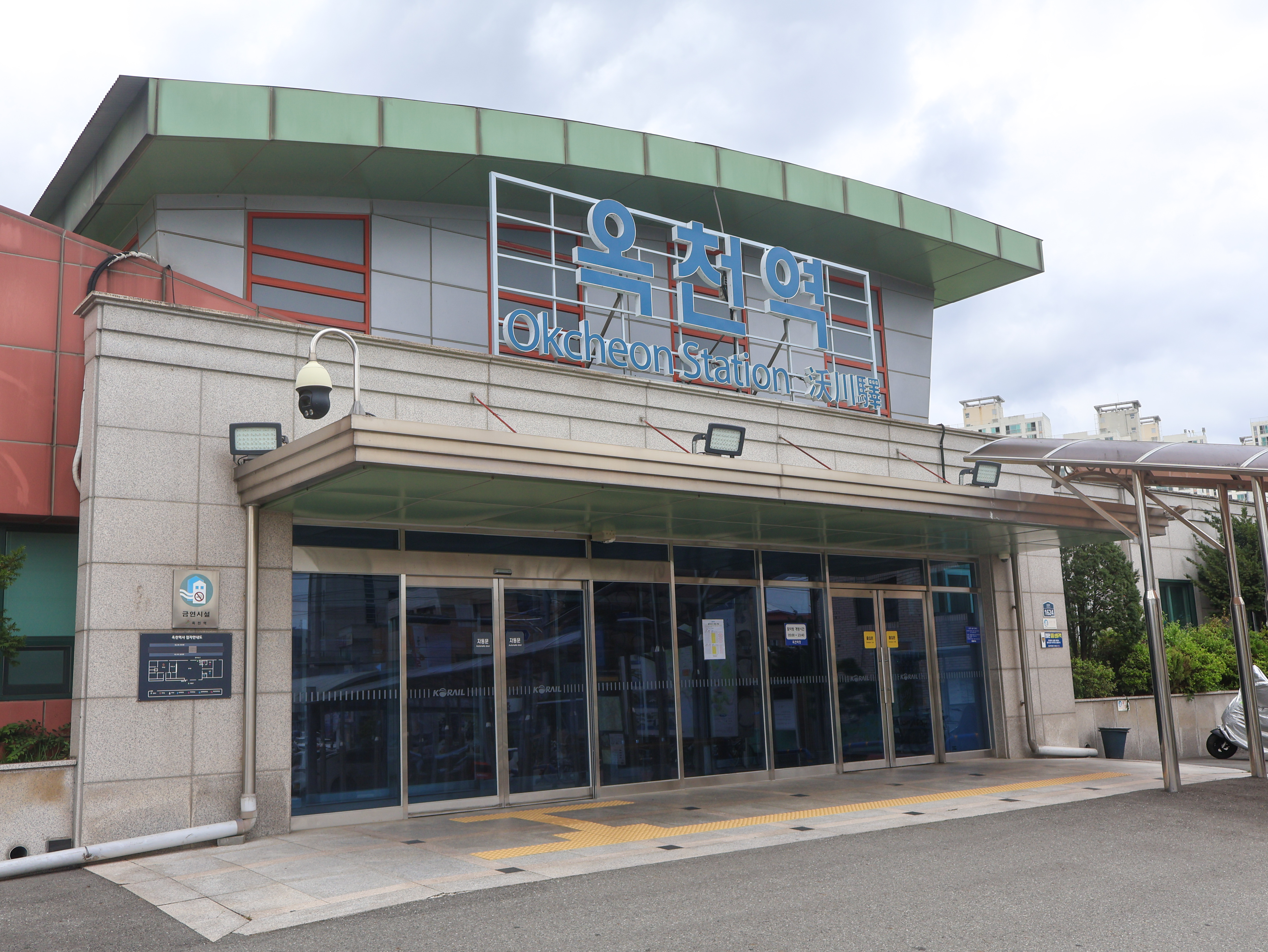
Okcheon station (2024)

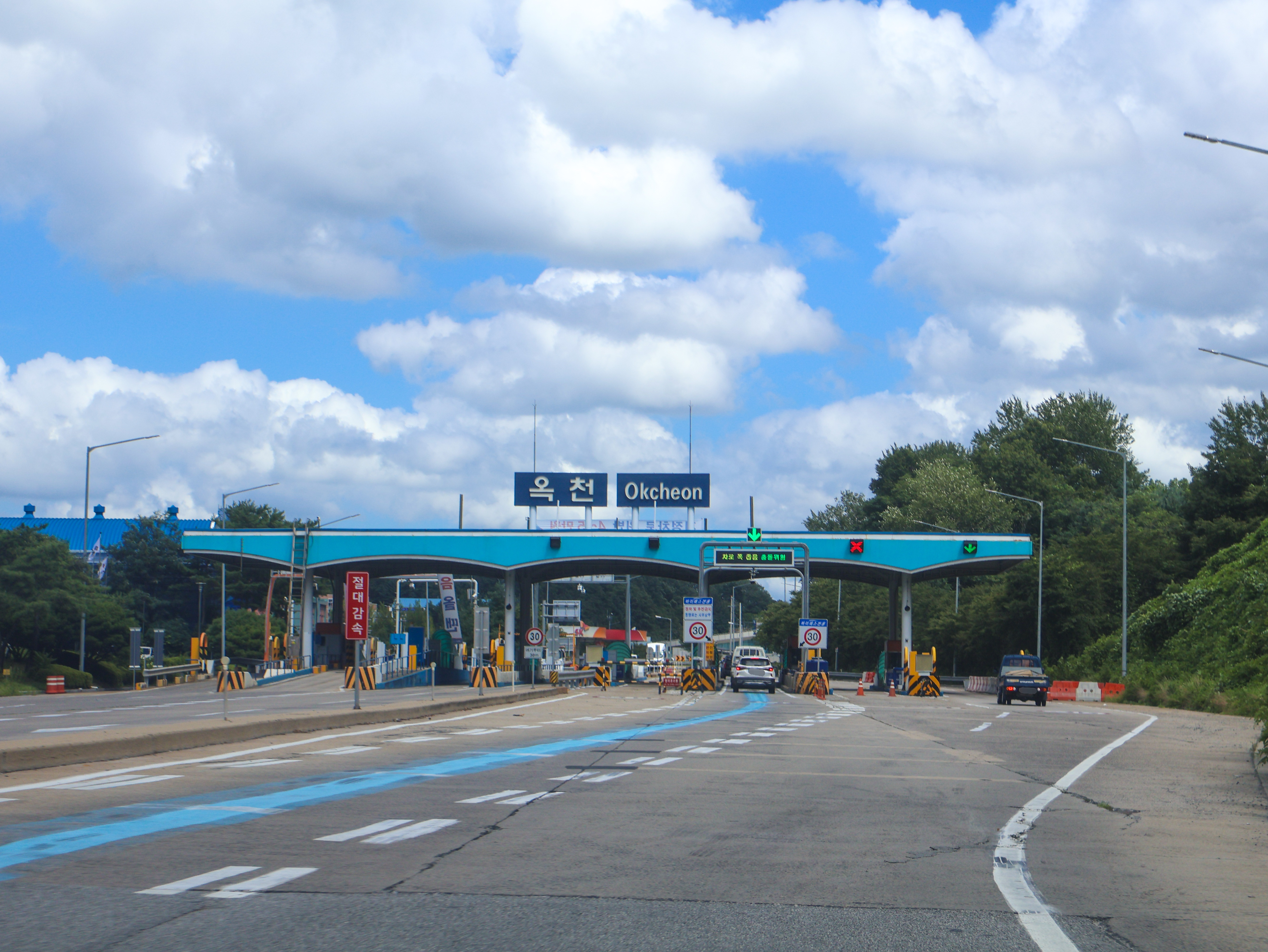
Okcheon IC (2024)

=== Highway ===
- National Route 3

=== Expressway ===
- Gyeongbu Expressway

=== Railway ===
- Gyeongbu Line
- Gyeongbu high-speed railway

== Twin towns – sister cities ==
Okcheon is twinned with:

- Gonohe, Aomori, Japan

== Prominent individuals ==
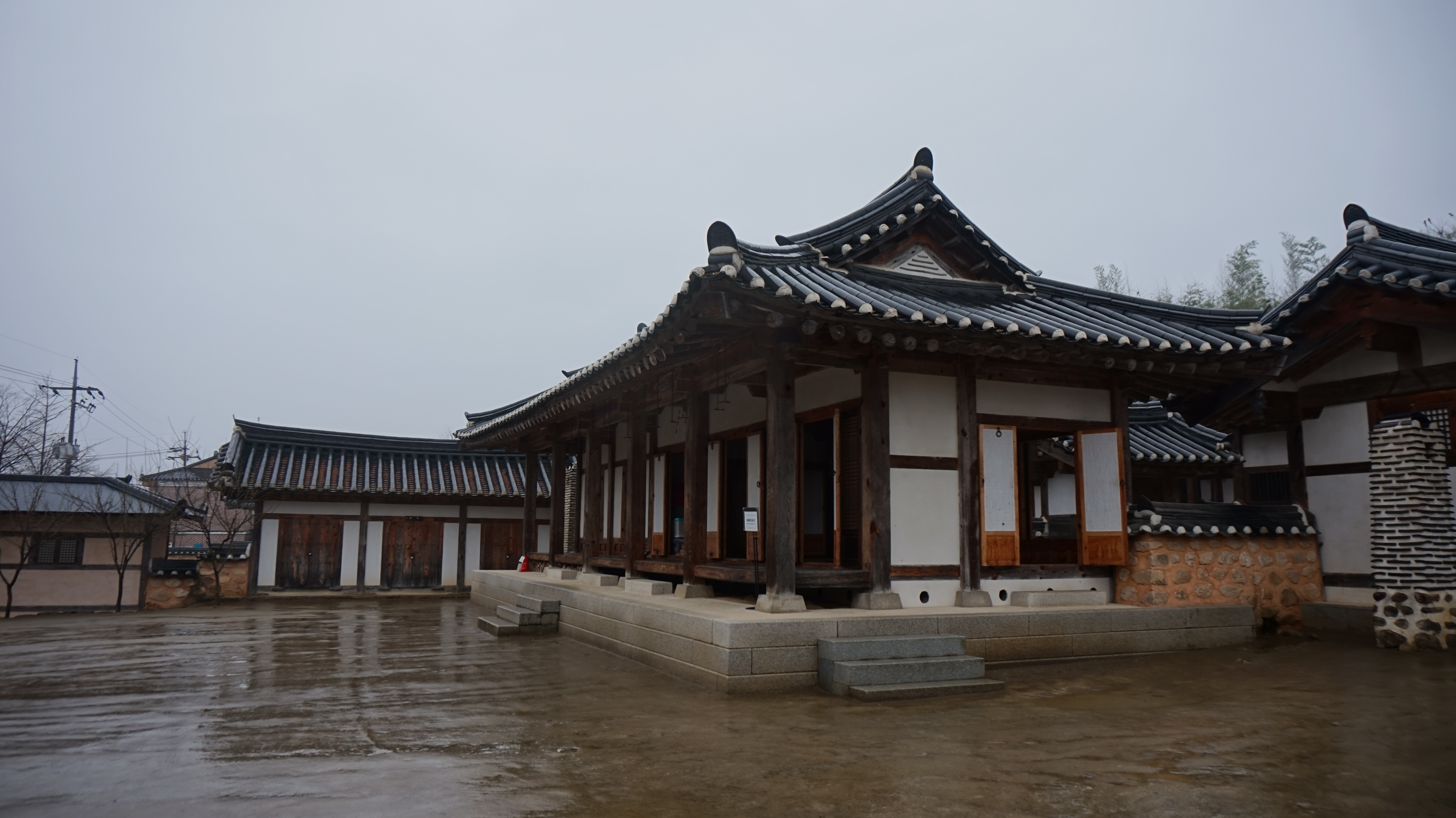
Yuk Young-soo's birthplace

- Lee Ok-bong, 16th century woman poet
- Jeong Ji-yong, modernist poet
- Song Si-yeol, Joseon statesman, Neo-Confucian scholar and philosopher
- Yuk Young-soo First Lady of Korea, killed during an assassination attempt on her husband, Park Chung Hee
- Mijoo, member of K-pop girl group Lovelyz
- Keum Donghyun, member of K-pop boy group Epex
