= Goh Gyong-Sook =

South Korean Writer and Illustrator of Children's books

- Born: 1972 (age 53–54); Seoul, South Korea
- Occupations: Author, illustrator
- Writing career
- Language: Korean
- Genre: Picture Books

Goh Gyong-Sook (고경숙; born 1972) is a South Korean writer and illustrator of children's books. Her major works include Jjajang, Jjamppong, Sweet and Sour Pork, The Enchanted Bottle, My Atelier, The Great Mungchi and It’s Me! She won the Ragazzi Award for Fiction at the 2006 Bologna International Children's Book Fair for the first book she wrote and illustrated, The Enchanted Bottle.

== Life ==
Goh Gyong-Sook was born in Seoul in 1972. She graduated from the Department of Oriental Painting at Dankook University, and majored in graphic design at the graduate school of Sookmyung Women's University. She began a collaborative relationship with Jaimimage after attending an illustration workshop hosted by Didimdol, a Korean publisher. She worked on three Classroom Library series books as an illustrator, and then embarked on a quest to find her own style. Inspired by bottles depicted in oil paintings, she created a picture book called The Enchanted Bottle. She uses cutouts of unique shapes from magazines to create her images.

== Career ==
Goh Gyong-Sook made her debut in children's literature through her work as an illustrator in the Classroom Library trilogy, Jjajang, Jjamppong, Sweet and Sour Pork, Never-Ending Weekly Duty, and Poop and Pee. Among them, Jjajang, Jjamppong, Sweet and Sour Pork won the Award of Excellence at the SBS Children's Media Awards, which is a prize given by a Korean broadcasting company, in 2001. Her first picture book, The Enchanted Bottle, was published in 2005 and was selected as the Korean entry for the 20th BIB (Biennial of illustration Bratislava) that year. The Enchanted Bottle won the Ragazzi Award in Fiction at the 2006 Bologna International Children's Book Fair, and was selected as a notable book by Le Monde in 2006. She participated in the 2007 group exhibition Small Publishers and Young Illustrators (petite édition / jeune illustration): Special Exhibition of Korean Picture Book Original Art, held at Saint-Priest Salon du livre, France. An exhibition dedicated to her work, Original Artworks of Goh Gyong-sook, was held as part of the Korean Children's Books and Artists exhibition at the Little Round Library (Petite bibliothèque ronde) in Clamart, France. Her work was featured in the Exhibition of Original Artwork from the Guest of Honor at the Bologna International Children's Book Fair in 2009, and also in the duo exhibition, Picture Books Like Toys, at the Anzola dell'Emilia Library. The Great Mungchi received the 2009 CJ Picture Book Grand Prize, and The Love of the Toy Soldier was selected for the 2011 CJ Picture Book Animation Award. She participated in an exhibition and workshop for The Great Mungchi in 2023 at the Nantes Municipal Library in France, by invitation of L'oeil du monde.

== Style ==
Jjajang, Jjamppong, Sweet and Sour Pork, Never-Ending Weekly Duty, and Poop and Pee featured realistic oriental painting techniques. However, The Enchanted Bottle employed Western painting techniques such as oil and gouache, and was rendered in a style different from Goh's previous works. Goh likes to draw using a wide variety of media and techniques such as colored pencils, collages, and graphics, rather than keeping to a certain technique and style. Her picture books exude playfulness. 100 Potted Plants is in the form of a foldable flap book, and My Atelier and Thinking With Crayons include pages that readers can use to draw themselves. Goh Gyong-Sook continues to explore new forms of artistic expression, free from associations with a particular genre or style.

== Awards ==
- 2011 Awarded CJ Picture Book Animation - The Love of a Toy Soldier
- 2009 Awarded CJ Picture Book - The Great Mungchi
- 2006 Ragazzi Awarded Bologna Prize for Fiction - The Enchanted Bottle

== Works as writer and illustrator ==
- 2022 Bomulia (Jaimimage) ISBN 9791192098104
- 2009 It's Me! (Jaimimage) ISBN 9788986565867
  - 2009 C'EST MOI!(éditions MeMo) France, ISBN 9782352890720
- 2007 100 Potted Plants (Jaimimage) ISBN 9788986565829
- 2006 The Great Mungchi (Jaimimage)ISBN 9791185996011
  - 2008 LE VOYAGE DE MOUNGCHI (éditions MeMo) France, ISBN 9782352890379
  - 2009 Il grande Bum-Bum (Orecchio Acerbo) Italy, ISBN 9788889025741
- 2005 The Enchanted Bottle (Jaimimage)ISBN 9788986565706
  - 2007 Flacons magiques (Seuil Jeunesse) France, ISBN 9782020927406
  - 2014 魔法甁 (人民敎育出版社) China, ISBN 9787107288814

== Collaborations with other authors ==
- 2017 Bunny Hat by Lee Ho-baek (Jaimimage) ISBN 9791185996790
- 2016 Thinking With Crayons by Lee Ho-baek (Jaimimage) ISBN 9791185996622
- 2013 Play with Me by Shin Su-jeong (Jaimimage) ISBN 9788986565034
- 2013 Dreams/Play with me/Alexis has/A Pet for Dan/I've Got something in my Pocket by Shin Su-jeong, from I'm Reading (Didimdol)
- 2011 The Love of a Toy Soldier by Hans Christian Andersen (Jaimimage) ISBN 9788986565980
- 2011 What the Neighbors Did by Philippa Pearce (Nonjang) ISBN 9788984141360
- 2006 My Atelier by Lee Ho-baek (Jaimimage) ISBN 9791185996905
  - 2009 MON ATELIER DES COULEURS (éditions MeMo) France, ISBN 9782352890478
- 2002 Poop and Pee by Kim Young-joo (Jaimimage) ISBN 9788986565546
- 2000 Never-Ending Weekly Duty by Kim Young-joo (Jaimimage) ISBN 9791185996950
- 1999 Jjajang, Jjamppong, Sweet and Sour Pork by Kim Young-joo (Jaimimage) ISBN 9788986565522
