= Eun-mi =

- Hangul: 은미
- RR: Eunmi
- MR: Ŭnmi
- IPA: [ɯnmi]

Eun-mi, also spelled Eun-mee, or Un-mee, is a Korean given name.

People with this name include:

- Lee Eun-mi (singer) (born 1966), South Korean singer
- Kim Eun-mi (gymnast) (born 1972), South Korean gymnast
- Bae Eun-mi (born 1973), South Korean gymnast
- Kim Eun-mi (handballer) (born 1975), South Korean handball player
- Ko Eun-mi (born 1976), South Korean actress
- Seok Eun-mi (born 1976), South Korean table tennis player
- Choi Eun-mi (born 1978), South Korean novelist
- Park Eun-mi (born 1987), South Korean track cyclist
- Lee Eun-mi (footballer) (born 1988), South Korean football player
- Yoo Eun-mi (born 2004), South Korean actress

== See also ==
- List of Korean given names
