= Kim Byeol-ah =

South Korean writer (born 1969)

- Born: 1969 (age 56–57)
- Writing career
- Language: Korean
- Notable work: Mishil

Korean name
- Hangul: 김별아
- RR: Gim Byeola
- MR: Kim Pyŏra

Kim Byeol-ah (born 1969) is a South Korean writer.

== Life ==
Kim Byeol-ah hails from the coastal town of Gangneung in Gangweon Province. She began her career as a writer in 1993. During the ten years that followed, she did not emerge as a major figure on the literary scene.

== Work ==
Kim's full-length novels during her first decade such as Pornography in my Heart (Nae maeum eui p’oreunogeurap’i) dealing with female sexuality, Personal Experience (Gaeinjeok cheheom) about college students in the early 1990s during the final years of the democratization movement, and Soccer Wars (Chukgu jeonjaeng) published just prior to the 2002 World Cup, lacked a unified or distinctive authorial vision.

Kim's writings became the focus of major attention in 2005, with the publication of her novel Mishil. Prior to Mishil, Gim had written a book for adolescent readers in 2003 called The Tale of Janghwa and Hongnyeon (Janghwa Hongnyeon jeon), a re-telling of the story of two sisters from a pre-modern Korean novel. From that point on, it seems Kim became interested in thematizing women from classical history in her literature. Mishil represents the pinnacle of her endeavors to bring historical women to life in the contemporary novel. Mishil is a woman from Silla, a kingdom that existed a thousand years ago on the Korean peninsula. She is a prototypical femme fatale who gains political power through her love affairs with kings and heroes. For its recreation of Mishil, the work received a Segye Munhak prize of a billion Korean won, the highest sum ever awarded to an author for a single work. This marked Kim's entry into the spotlight of the Korean literary scene.

After the success of Mishil, Kim published Farewell Forever and Ever, Farewell Forever (Yeongyeong ibyeol yeong ibyeol) about the fate of Princess Jeongsun, wife of the ill-fated King Danjong who ascended the throne at the age of twelve, but whose power was stolen from him by his uncle, leading to the boy king's tragic death. More recently, Kim published Nongae, about a nineteen-year-old courtesan who embraced a Japanese general during the Imjin Invasion and pushed him together with herself over a cliff.

Since Mishil, Kim has conducted thorough historical research in her quest to uncover the lives of women from history. Through descriptions of individual psychologies suffering existence and fate in tragic social conditions, Kim constructs a consistent literary world that is her very own.

== Awards ==
- Cheongnyeon Simsan Literary Prize (1991)
- Segye Ilbo Literary Prize (2005)

== Works in Korean (partial) ==
Short Stories

- The tribe of dreams(Kkum-ui bujok 2002)

Novels

- Pornography in my Heart (Nae maeum-ui poreunogeurapi 1995)
- Personal Experience (Gaeinjeok cheheom)
- Football War/Soccer War (Chukgujeonjaeng)
- Mishil (2005)
- Farewell Forever (Yeongyeongibyeol yeongibyeol 2005)
- Nongae 1.2 (2007)
- Baekbeom
- Passionate Love (Yeolae)
- Rainbow (Chaehong)
- Flower of Fire (Bul-ui kkot)

== See also ==
- Korean Literature
- List of Korean novelists
- List of Korean female writers
