= Lee Ze-ha =

South Korean writer and artist (born 1938)

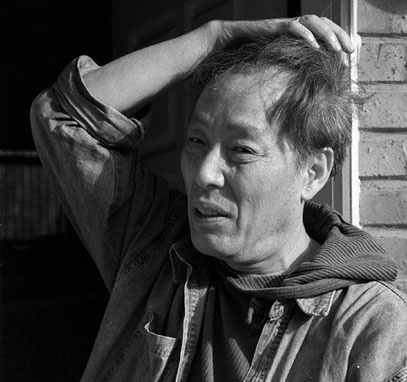
- Born: April 20, 1938 (age 88)
- Education: Hongik University
- Children: Yun I-hyeong
- Writing career
- Language: Korean
- Period: 1956–present

Korean name
- Hangul: 이제하
- Hanja: 李祭夏
- RR: I Jeha
- MR: I Cheha

Lee Ze-ha (Korean: 이제하; born 1938) is a South Korean writer, poet and painter.

== Biography ==
Lee Ze-ha was born in 1938 in Miryang, Keishōnan Province, Korea, Empire of Japan. Lee studied fine art and sculpture at Hongik University, and immersed himself in the works of William Faulkner and Camus, while exploring expressionism and surrealism. Lee has also taught creative writing at Myongji University. He made his formal literary debut with the publication of "Hand" in 1961.

== Work ==
The Literature Translation Institute of Korea summarizes Lee's work:

Lee Jeha's literary method has been described as "fantastic realism": rather than abiding by the principle of coherence or consistency, as realist novels are wont to do, Lee Jeha's works of fiction create complex composites by piecing together conflicting strands of thought. This method is predicated on the author's belief that traditional modes of storytelling express certain realities but suppress others from emerging to the surface. For Lee Jeha, the blending of fantasy and reality not only reflects the confused state of the world and contradictions inherent in human nature, but offers a way out of this impasse.

"A Traveler Does Not Rest Even on the Road" (Nageune neun gil eseodo swiji anneunda) earned Lee the Yi-Sang Literature Prize in 1985. In addition to his writing, Lee works in other artistic genres. He was written movie scripts, composed soundtracks, and exhibited his own artwork.

== Works in Korean (Partial) ==
Fiction

- A Sketch in Charcoal (Moktan dessaeng)
- A Certain Celebration (Eoneu chukhahoe)
- The Blind Opens His Eyes (Sogyeong nun tteuda)
- Train, Steamship, Sea, Sky (Gicha, giseon, bada, haneul)
- A Photograph of the Deceased (Goinui sajin)
- Vegetable Diet (Chosik)
- Dragon (Yong)
- In Search of Horses (Mareul chajaseo)
- A Short Biography of Yuja (Yuja yakjeon)
- A Traveler Does Not Rest Even on the Road (Nageune neun gil eseodo swiji anneunda)

Poetry

- Feeling Lamplight in that Darkness (Jeo eodum sok deungbit deureul neukki deusi, 1982)

Novels

- The Temple of a Mad Painter (Gwanghwasa, 1986)
- A Girl Named Yuja (Sonyeo Yuja)
- A Sleety Marriage (Jinun kkaebi gyeolhon, 1990)

== Awards ==
- Yi Sang Literature Prize in 1985 (A Traveler Does Not Rest Even on the Road)
