= Yi Okpong =

16th century Korean female poet (? - c. 1592)

Yi Okpong (Note: Okpong may have been a pen name and her real given name Sugwŏn. In English sources her full name is often spelled Lee Ok-bong.) (Korean: 이옥봉; Hanja: 李玉峯; ? - c. 1592) was a 16th century Korean poet born in Okcheon County in the mid-Joseon Dynasty who was the illegitimate daughter of a royal family and a concubine. Her father was Yi Pong, of Chungcheong Province, governor of Okcheon County, and a leader of the volunteer Korean army fighting against the Japanese invasions of Korea. She showed a gift for writing from a young age and was especially good at poetry. She became known for her poetry. Later as a young adult she fell in love with Cho Wŏn, a scholar, who was from a prominent family and a high-ranking official for state examinations. She requested to become his concubine but he agreed only if she would give up writing poetry as he felt her fame would belittle his status.

Ten years later an elderly neighbor woman asks her to write a poem to clear her husband, who had been accused of cattle thievery and arrested. The elder neighbor begged by pulling on Yi's skirt. Yi writes the poem without telling her husband: "Even if I use the washbasin as a mirror / And comb my hair with water as oil / If I am not the Weaver Girl / How can my husband become the Cowherd?". The clever analogy to the Chinese folktale The Cowherd and the Weaver Girl impresses the head of the Ministry of Justice and the neighbor's husband is released. When Cho Wŏn learns of this, he sternly reprimands her and banishes her to her parents' home, where she began writing poetry again.

War came to Korea and Yi's whereabouts were unknown. After 40 years, Cho Wŏn's son went as an envoy to China. He was told Yi's body had been found on China's east coast, wrapped in hundreds of layers of paper and tied with a rope. The writing on the paper was published as a book. Yi had wrapped herself in her own poems and jumped into the sea because she could not return to her husband.

== In media ==
- Jang, Jeong -hee (2020). 옥봉 [Okpong] (in Korean). Seoul: Kang Publishers. ISBN 9788982182686.
