= Roh Chol-min =

North Korean soldier (born 1998)

- Born: Roh Chol-min; 1998; North Korea
- Other names: Noh Cheol-min
- Occupations: Human rights activist; Soldier
- Years active: 2017 – present

Roh Chol-min (Korean: 노철민; born 1998), also known as Noh Cheol-min, is a former North Korean soldier who defected to South Korea across the Demilitarized Zone (DMZ) on December 21, 2017. His account of service in the North Korean People's Army (KPA) gained international attention for exposing systemic corruption and deprivation within the regime's specialized military branches.

== Early life and pedigree ==
Roh was born into a family with high-status social lineage. His grandfather was reportedly a university classmate of former North Korean leader Kim Jong-il, providing the family with initial elite standing. Growing up in a rural mountain town near the Chinese border, Roh initially experienced relative luxury, including access to a television and couch. However, as the North Korean economy contracted, his family's fortunes declined; he has recalled instances where his sister sold herbs to provide basic meals like a single potato.

== Military service and observations ==
Roh was drafted into the KPA's 200,000-strong special forces, a selection influenced by his social "foundation" and his physical height—5 feet 8 inches—which is considered exceptionally tall in North Korea. In late summer 2017, he was stationed as a new recruit at a guard post on the front lines of the DMZ. Roh witnessed widespread bribery where fellow soldiers from wealthy backgrounds paid senior officers to skip mandatory drills and target practice. Despite his unit's elite status, he suffered from chronic hunger and a lack of medical care. He described a period of fanatical loyalty, recalling a "glorious" day when he sobbed with emotion after seeing Kim Jong-un pass his base in a black van.

== Defection ==
On the morning of December 21, 2017, Roh took advantage of heavy fog to walk across the Military Demarcation Line into South Korea. Unlike the violent defection of Oh Chong-song weeks earlier, Roh was not shot during his crossing. However, his escape triggered a confrontation because South Korean troops fired approximately 20 warning shots as North Korean soldiers approached the border in search of him.

Roh stated he chose to defect because, unlike his peers, he lacked the financial means to "buy" a future through bribes for better treatment or promotions, leading him to feel he was disposable. He was secured by South Korean troops in a thick fog and taken into custody for questioning.

== Life in South Korea ==
After completing the mandatory integration process at the Hanawon center, Roh settled in Seoul. In 2020, he was a university student and worked part-time as a server at a wedding-hall buffet. He has publicly expressed a fondness for South Korean lifestyle staples, such as hot lattes and Sherlock Holmes novels, contrasting his current freedom with the strict ideological hagiographies he was required to consume in North Korea.

His story was prominently featured in the 2020 Wall Street Journal report "A North Korean Defector's Tale Shows Rotting Military" and documented in the book Vanished by photographer Tim Franco.
