= Son Sohui =

South Korean poet (1917–1987)

Son Sohui 손소희
- Son Sohui
- Born: 손소희; September 12, 1917; North Hamgyong Province
- Died: January 7, 1987 (aged 69)
- Education: Nihon University, Hankuk University of Foreign Studies
- Spouse: Kim Dongni
- Writing career
- Language: Korean

- Son Sohui
- Hangul: 손소희
- Hanja: 孫素熙
- RR: Son Sohui
- MR: Son Sohŭi

Son Sohui (Korean: 손소희, September 12, 1917 – January 7, 1987) was a South Korean writer of novels and short stories. A leading woman writer in the colonial and postwar periods, she is considered one of the first Korean authors to address women's psychological struggles in fiction.

== Early life and education ==
Son Sohui was born in 1917 in North Hamgyong Province's Eorang township, Kyongsong County, in what is now North Korea.

After graduating from a girls' school in Hamhung in 1936, she traveled to study English at Japan's Nihon University, but she dropped out of the program after a short period. She would later study English at Hankuk University of Foreign Studies, graduating in 1961.

== Career ==
Throughout her 40-year career Son Sohui wrote over one hundred short stories and eleven novels. Her career began in 1939, when she began publishing poetry while working as a journalist for the Manseon Ilbo in Manchuria. After returning to Korea following Korean independence from Japan in 1945, Son Sohui continued to write and publish her work, with several poems published in the influential monthly magazine Sinsedae, and many short stories written. Her first short story collection, Iragi (梨羅記), was published in 1948. She also continued her work as a journalist in this period, serving as editor in chief of the magazine Hyeseong (혜성, Comet) from 1949 until the start of the Korean War, and shepherding the growth of the magazine Hanguk Munhak (한국문학, Korean Literature), through which she helped offer young writers the chance to be published for the first time.

Later in her career Son Sohui primarily focused on writing novels, beginning with Taeyangui Gyegok (태양의 계곡, "The Valley of the Sun") in 1959. She also worked as an academic, teaching at Sorabol College (1965), Hongik University (1968), and Chung-Ang University (1978).

Son Sohui is thought to be one of the first Korean writers to focus specifically on women's struggles. Her work frequently incorporated themes of madness and suicide in portraying women's responses to an oppressive society, employing a psychological realist style. She also addressed gender and ethnic issues during the Japanese occupation, becoming a leading female novelist of the Japanese colonial period. In 1961 she was the recipient of both the Seoul Culture Award and the May Literary Award.

Her 1963 novel Nampung (남풍) was translated into English in 1988 as The Wind From the South. In the 1980s and 90s, her work was also included in translation in the anthologies Modern Korean Short Stories and Modern Korean Literature: An Anthology.

== Personal life, death, and legacy ==
Son Sohui was the second wife of fellow writer Kim Dongni, whom she married in 1953 and also collaborated with.

She died in 1987. In 2012 she was featured in the YoungIn Museum of Literature's exhibit "Korean Women’s Literature 30 Years."

== Selected works ==
=== Works in translation (partial) ===
- The Wind from the South (남풍), tr. Suzanne Crowder, 1988
- "At the End of the World", tr. Kim Chong-un (in Postwar Korean Short Stories, ed. Kim Chong-un, 1984; Hospital Room 205 and Other Korean Short Stories, 1983)
- "The Afternoon of Mellow Persimmons", tr. Angela Chung (in Modern Korean Literature: An Anthology 1908-65, ed. Chong Chung-Wha, 1995; Modern Korean Short Stories, ed. Chong Chung-Wha, 1980)

=== Works in Korean (partial) ===
- The Valley of the Sun (태양의 계곡)
- The Sun, That Day (그날의 햇빛은)
- Conversion (회심(回心))
- Iragi (이라기(梨羅記))
- Hyeonhaetan (현해탄)
- South Wind (남풍)
- Season of Primary Colours (원색의 계절)
- The Raven's Cry (갈가마귀 그 소리)
