= Yun I-hyeong =

South Korean writer (born 1976)

- Born: Lee Seul; 1976 (age 49–50)
- Education: Yonsei University
- Occupation: writer
- Relatives: Lee Ze-ha (farther)
- Writing career
- Language: Korean
- Period: 2005 -
- Genres: contemporary fiction, science fiction

Korean name
- Hangul: 이슬
- RR: I Seul
- MR: I Sŭl

Pen name
- Hangul: 윤이형
- RR: Yun Ihyeong
- MR: Yun Ihyŏng

Yun I-hyeong (born in 1976) is a South Korean writer.

== Life ==
Her real name is Seul Lee and she was born in 1976 in Seoul, Korea to the writer Lee Ze-ha. After graduating from Yonsei University with a BA in English Language, she debuted as a writer in 2005 by winning the Joong Ang New Writer Award (중앙신인문학상) with her short novel “검은 불가사리.”

== Work ==
After her debut, Yi continued to write, to write short novels and released “피의 일요일” and “셋을 위한 왈츠” (both in 2006). Most of her published books are collections of shorts stories written by her and sometime her stories will be in a collection with other authors. Her writing was known for going beyond the boundaries of dreams and reality. Her other stories includes “큰 늑대 파랑”, “루카”, and “개인의 기억” She was nominated and won the 5th annual Lineage Literature Award (제5회 문지문학상) with her book “루카” which is about homosexuals falling in love. The prize for this award is 10,000,000 won.

She was previously a candidate for the 4th annual Lineage Literature Award through her story “Goodbye.” Author Yun was also nominated for the 5th Annual Young Writer's Award and won a prize of 5,000,000 won as a candidate. Her workpiece that was nominated was “쿤의 여행.” First place for the award went to Hwang Jung-eun.

Yun's sole translation into English is Danny the story of a too-human-like robot. Yun takes postmodern trends, in this case the weakening of family bonds, increased mechanization, and the alarming Korean susceptibility to large-level loss of life during catastrophe and blends them together into a charming, and ultimately sad, story of new and unlikely social bonds being restored – in this case between a worn out grandmother and a childcare robot named Danny. Danny is Yun's only translated book so far, but as “Her writing ([is] known for going beyond the boundaries of dreams and reality” (Naver Encyclopedia) including topics controversial in Korea such as homosexual love.

Yun is often grouped, along with such writers as Park Min-gyu, Pyun Hye-young, Cho Hahyeong, and Yun Ko-eun as post-apocalyptic. In fact, discussing two of her more popular works LIST Magazine notes:

Yun I-hyeong’s The Big Wolf, Blue is about a virtual disaster born of contemporary man’s mindset that seeks to resolve all problems via cyberspace. Yun experiments with sci-fi and fantasy to explore new literary horizons in her second novel, The Big Wolf, Blue. Sara the protagonist is not in the least surprised when she hears news of zombies consuming human flesh and growing in number by inflicting harm on others. Her lukewarm response to news of the catastrophe reminds us of our reality where disasters strike so often we have become desensitized to calamity. When her cable and electricity are cut off, she senses that she, too, will soon be eaten by a zombie. The problem that Blue, a virtual image created by a computer program, must resolve, is not one that pertains to future societies far off in the future, but the bewilderment and despair of today’s young men and women.

As horrifying as the cataclysm that is turning the entire human race into zombies is the despair of the four young protagonists who realized that they are growing old without ever having lived the way they had wanted to. In a world where no one can save them, the young protagonists believe that the virtual wolf they have made with the computer program will one day jump out of the computer and save them.

== Awards ==
- Joong Ang New Writer Award (2005)
- 5th annual Lineage Literature Award
- Yi Sang Literary Award (2018)

== Bibliography ==
=== Works in translation ===
- Danny, Asia Publishers, 2015

=== Works in Korean (partial) ===
- Black Starfisha
- Bloody Sunday
- Waltz for Three
- Big Blue Wolf
- Luka
