= Nora Noh =

South Korean fashion designer (born 1928)

- Born: Noh Myeong-ja; March 21, 1928 (age 98); Keijō, Korea, Empire of Japan
- Occupation: Fashion designer
- Years active: 1952–present

Korean name
- Hangul: 노명자
- RR: No Myeongja
- MR: No Myŏngja
- Website: www.noranoh.com

Noh Myeong-ja (Korean: 노명자; born March 21, 1928), known professionally as Nora Noh (노라 노), is a South Korean fashion designer. After studying and working in the fashion industry in the United States, she returned to Seoul to establish her own company, House of Nora Noh (later known as Nora Nou), in 1952. Her style blends American and French fashion trends with traditional Korean materials and history.

Noh was among the first South Korean fashion designers to establish a presence in the United States. By the mid-1960's, her collections were sold at prominent American department stores, including Macy's, Bloomingdale's, and Sak's Fifth Avenue.

Her notable contributions to South Korean fashion history include staging the country's first fashion show in Seoul in 1956, and designing the "Arirang Dress". Styled as a Western-style evening gown incorporating traditional hanbok elements, the garment was worn at the 1959 Miss Universe pageant and designated a National Registered Cultural Heritage in 2014. Noh also introduced progressive fashion trends to South Korea by styling singer Yoon Bok-hee in miniskirts and the pop duo The Pearl Sisters in pantaloons.

== Early life ==
Noh Myeong-ja was born in Yeonnam-dong, Keijō, Korea, Empire of Japan (now Seoul, South Korea) on March 21, 1928. Her father, Noh Chang-seong, grew up an orphan until he was adopted and raised by a Japanese innkeeper in Manchuria. Noh's mother was the only other Korean at their school, and they were married soon after. The couple returned to Seoul where they raised their eight children. Noh was raised by her maternal grandparents, as her father co-founded Gyeongseong Broadcasting Station, Korea's first radio station. Noh's mother, Lee Ok-Kyung, was Korea's first broadcast announcer. Noh's earliest encounters with western fashion came from her mother and maternal grandfather, Lee Hak-In, who collected tailored suits.

== Education ==
Noh attended to Gyeonggi Girls’ High in Seoul and graduated in 1944. To escape Japan's comfort women system at the height of World War II, Noh's parents arranged for her to be married off to a Japanese lieutenant at age 17. While living with her in-laws, Noh was abused and mistreated. She received a message presuming her husband had died in battle, and the family urged her divorce in order to receive the war-widow bonds. Noh refused and left.

After finding out her husband was alive in 1946, Noh attempted a reconciliation with her in-laws, which did not work out. Noh divorced her husband at age 19. She worked for the American government as a typist before her handiwork was noticed by her supervisor at a party—her dress made up of pieces of her mother's hanbok skirt. Her supervisor later sponsored and requested available positions for her in New York and Califonian garment houses. Noh left South Korea in the summer of 1947 to receive her college education from Frank W. Wiggins Trade School in Los Angeles, California, United States. She learned English and began working with designers under Californian retailers, specifically sportswear company Tabak of California and Ann Taylor (now known as Ann Inc.), where she learned how to make clothes commercially.

== Historical Background ==
=== Pre World War II fashion context (1920s–1940s) ===
The "Modern Girl/Boy Era" of the 1920s-1940s challenged Korean society's ideas around gender, class, and the introduction of Japanese and Western capitalism and expansionism across Asia. The country's rapid industrialization under Japan's occupation of Korea led to an emphasis on educating women on how to be a "wise mother, good wife", a woman that could competently educate and raise their children while also fulfilling the duties of a housewife. As women received higher education, and changes were made to the school uniform by shortening the long skirt for better ease of movement.

Magazines were used to disseminate Japan's interpretation of western modernity through fashion illustrations and advertisements. Western fashion trends like short hair, animal furs, handbags, parasols, pleated skirts, blouses, cardigans, and short heels were popular amongst young women. Tailored suits, silk vests, canes, and hats trended with young men. The movement offered a lifestyle of carefree, hedonistic, stylish youth. Often these people had jobs that were not labor-intensive. The movement received criticism for its implication of alcohol abuse, substance abuse, sexual promiscuity, lack of individualism, rampant consumerism, and what defined "modernity" under Japanese colonialism.

=== Western Influence on Post-War Korea (1950–1959) ===
South Korea's post-war reconstruction and modernization was influenced by former Japanese occupation, the Korean War, and foreign aid from the United States.The large influx of American aid sped up South Korea's plans to modernize. To solve the post-war poverty, food shortages, population, unemployment crises from Russia's occupation of North Korea, the South Korean government transitioned from an agricultural economy to a capitalistic one with the aid of the United States' administration. Jobs in the labor industries rose, and people who worked during the war continued after it ended. Most of the country was still in poverty, using post-war items like American parachutes and military uniforms to make clothing. American donations like school supplies, food, and clothing were given to the upper class, and the government sought to suppress the everyday woman from wearing American clothing for its "vanity and extravagance". Korean women rejected the idea in favor of creating clothes that were equally as comfortable as they were stylish, opting for shorter-length hanbok skirts or wearing pants. What drew women in to certain American clothing styles were its affordability and practicality for working women.

America's ideas around independence and female autonomy was at odds with the country's Japanese Confucianist ideals. American GIs stationed in Korea had an influence on Korean women and the Korean feminist movement, shaping the idea that women's autonomy could be separate from the familial structure, instead seeing themselves as working people. From ideals food, transportation, and clothing, South Korea had become an "Americanized" country.

== Career ==
=== Korea's First Fashion Show (1956) ===
After returning to South Korea in 1949, Noh worked to established her company, "House of Nora Noh" (later known as "Nora Noh") in 1952. Inspired by the fashion shows she'd been to in Paris, France, Noh emphasized tailor-made items made from premium materials. put on South Korea's first-ever fashion show in 1956 at the Bando Hotel in Seoul. Models included actresses Uhm Aeng-ran and Choi Eun-hee. The luxury line included dresses cinched waistlines and A-line skirts, reminiscent of western Hollywood ballgown dresses worn by Audrey Hepburn. Noh continued to do costume design for film and TV with the models and actresses, tailoring outfits for each scene they were in.

=== Cold War fashion vs. Styling the Mainstream (1960–1979) ===
In 1963, Noh came out with a line of "ready-made" clothing in response to the increasing women's labor force, making her one of the first fashion designers to commercialize her clothing.

In January 1967, Noh styled singer Yoon Bok-Hee in a miniskirt, making her one of the first Korean stars to introduce the miniskirt to conservative South Korea. Despite the backlash from the press, Yoon continued to worked with Noh, who styled her in mini dresses. She also styled the girl group, The Pearl Sisters, in pantaloons, which also caused an uproar.

Noh became the first Korean designer to tap into a global market, and from 1979–1994, she sold her designs in American department stores like Macy's, Bloomingdales, Sak's Fifth Avenue, Nordstrom, and more.

Nowadays, the brand, "Nora Noh", continues to make custom pieces. On the website, the brand claims it sources its fabrics from factories in Korea, strives for 100% sustainability with their materials, fights fair treatment of their employees, and still has personalized tailoring services.

== Personal life ==
Noh's first name, "Nora" is a reference to the main character of the same name in Henrik Ibsen's play, A Doll's House (1879). In the play, the protagonist, Nora, learns to free herself from the fear and control of the patriarchal standards of how a woman and mother is perceived.

Noh's most recent appearance was for BTS' promotion of their album, "Arirang" (2026), in which she was interviewed about her journey as a Korean fashion designer.

== Style and Designs ==
Noh's style has been described as "classy", "stylish", "sexy", and "well-controlled elegance". Her use of rich, bold patterns, colors, and precise tailoring allows for any model to feel as though their piece is exactly theirs. Molded to fit the wearer's body, Noh's choice to use Korean fabrics and materials make her pieces look and feel one-of-a-kind and striking. Some design motifs in her work include cinched waists with rounded skirts for the dresses and strong, angular shoulders in the blouses and blazers, but other times, the edges are soft and plush like her trench coats.

Her most famous design, the "Arirang Dress", is a re-imagining of a traditional hanbok. Designed for a Miss Universe contest in 1959, Noh, "preserved the quintessientially Korean elements, such as its elegant lines and colors, tailoring it as an evening gown". It was named a National Registered Cultural Heritage item in 2014. Using Korean silks, the design of the dress is meant to mimic the high waistline and flowing skirt. The piece is named after the Arirang song, a national Korean song that has over 3,600 lyrical and regional variations and usages.
