= Kim Jae-hong (author) =

South Korean illustrator (born 1958)

- Born: February 14, 1958 Gyeonggi, South Korea
- Occupation: Author, illustrator
- Language: Korean
- Genre: Picture Books, Drawing
- Notable works: The Children of the Donggang River, Yeong-I’s Plastic Umbrella, In the Forest, Cat School

Kim Jae-hong (Korean: 김재홍; born February 14, 1958) is a South Korean illustrator. He has held solo and group exhibitions presenting works based on the theme of "humans and nature as one." In 2004, he received the International Children's Book Award from the Foundation Espace Enfants in Switzerland for his first Picture book, The Children of the Donggang River.

== Career ==
Kim received the International Children's Book Award in 2004 from the Foundation Espace Enfants in Switzerland for his first Picture book, The Children of the Donggang Rive. One of the original illustrations of the book, entitled Mother and Child, has been featured in the art textbook for first-year high school students in Korea. Cat School (written by Kim Jin-kyung) released in 2001 was subsequently translated and published in Taiwan, China, Japan, and France. The book received Le Prix des Incorruptibles, a French children's literature award, in 2006. It is the only work from Asia to have been selected for the CM2/6e. The book was officially invited to the Paris Book Festival. In 2007, Yeong-I’s Plastic Umbrella received the Children's Jury Award at the Biennial of Illustration Bratislava. In 2016, he produced illustrations for Taebaek Mountain Range, a novel series by Jo Jeong-rae. He has also created illustrations for works by Park Wan-suh, Kim Yongtaek, Kim Hyang-Yi, and Lee Guem-yi.

His illustrations often contain hidden illustrations. For example, the landscapes of rocks and the river in The Children of Donggang River contain hidden images of a large bird, a bear, a mother, a father and children. The forest scene in In the Forest features hidden images of a cicada, tigers, rabbits and dragonflies.

== Awards ==
- 2019 Korean Nominations for Biennial of Illustration Bratislava (BIB) - That Autumn
- 2007 Biennial of Illustration Bratislava (BIB), Children's Jury Prize - Yeong-I’s Plastic Umbrella
- 2006 Winner of the Le Prix des Incorruptibles, a French children's literature award - Cat School Series
- 2004 Winner of the Le Prix International du Livre Espace- Enfants - The Children of the Donggang River

== Works as writer and illustrator ==
- 2013 Roadkill, we're out of our way (spoonbook) ISBN 978-89-93260-85-4
- 2000 In the Forest (Gilbut Children Publishing) ISBN 978-89-86621-74-7
  - 2013 在樹林裡 (廣智文化事業股份有限公司, China) ISBN 978-986-6034-54-1
  - 2007 Dans les bois (Picquier Jeunesse, France) ISBN 9782877309547
- 2000 The Children of the Donggang River (Gilbut Children Publishing) ISBN 978-89-86621-72-3
  - 2008 Les enfants de la riviere (Picquier Jeunesse, France) ISBN 9782809700251
  - 2007 かわべのトンイとスニ (小学館, Japan) ISBN 978-4-09-726205-3
  - 2005 Les enfants de la riviere-DONG (Les Portes du Monde, France) ISBN 9782847460995

== Collaborations with other authors ==
- 2018 That Autumn with Kwon Jeong-saeng, Yoo Eun-sil (Changbi) ISBN 978-89-364-5533-0
- 2016 Taebaek Mountain Range with Jo Jeong-rae (hainaim) ISBN 978-89-6574-920-2
- 2016 The Witch of Blonew Forest 2 – Cat School Paris episode with Kim Jin-Kyung (Munhakdongne) ISBN 9788954639071
  - 2016 LA SORCIERE ET LE JARDIN SECRET 2 (Pilippe picquier, France) ISBN 9782809711998
- 2016 The Witch of Blonew Forest 1 – Cat School Paris episode with Kim Jin-Kyung (Munhakdongne) ISBN 9788954639064
  - 2016 LA SORCIERE ET LE JARDIN SECRET 1 (Pilippe picquier, France) ISBN 9782809711608
- 2015 A love tree that has become one with Yoon Tae-kyu(Bombom) ISBN 978-89-91742-73-4
  - 2020 相親相愛的兄弟樹 (大穎文化事業股份有限公司, Taiwan) ISBN 978-957-9125-83-3
- 2014 The Secret of Angkor Wat 3 - Cat School The World episode with Kim Jin-Kyung (Munhakdongne) ISBN 978-89-546-2423-7
  - 2015 ECOLE DES CHATS A ANGKOR 3 - L'AME DE CRISTAL (Pilippe picquier, France) ISBN 9782809711080
- 2013 The Secret of Angkor Wat 2 - Cat School The World episode with Kim Jin-Kyung (Munhakdongne) ISBN 978-89-546-2359-9
  - 2015 ECOLE DES CHATS A ANGKOR 2 - LES CLONES D'APOPHIS (Pilippe picquier, France) ISBN 9782809710892
- 2013 The Secret of Angkor Wat 1 - Cat School The World episode with Kim Jin-Kyung (Munhakdongne) ISBN 978-89-546-2358-2
  - 2015 ECOLE DES CHATS A ANGKOR 1 - LE SECRET D'ANGKOR (Pilippe picquier, France) ISBN 9782809710403
- 2007 Cat School 3 vol.3 - The Giant's Field with Kim Jin-Kyung (Munhakdongne) ISBN 978-89-546-3210-2
  - 2010 DERNIERES AVENTURES DE L'ECOLE DES CHATS 3 – PLAINE (Pilippe picquier, France) ISBN 9782809701739
- 2007 Cat School 3 vol.2 - The stone in the sky with Kim Jin-Kyung (Munhakdongne) ISBN 978-89-546-3209-6
  - 2009 DERNIERES AVENTURES DE L'ECOLE DES CHATS 2 – PIERRES (Pilippe picquier, France) ISBN 9782809701210
- 2007 Cat School 3 vol.1 - Legend of the Bronze Mirror with Kim Jin-Kyung (Munhakdongne) ISBN 978-89-546-3208-9
  - 2009 DERNIERES AVENTURES DE L'ECOLE DES CHATS 1 – MIROIR (Pilippe picquier, France) ISBN 9782809701043
- 2007 Cat School 2 vol.3 - White Starfish with Kim Jin-Kyung (Munhakdongne) ISBN 978-89-546-3207-2
  - 2008 NOUVELLES AVENTURES DE L'ECOLE DES CHATS 3 - BULGASSARI (Pilippe picquier, France) ISBN 9782809700190
- 2007 Cat School 2 vol.2 - The Secret of the Golden Crown with Kim Jin-Kyung (Munhakdongne) ISBN 978-89-546-3206-5
  - 2008 NOUVELLES AVENTURES DE L'ECOLE DES CHATS 2 - SECRET DE LA Pilippe picquier, France) ISBN 9782809700138
- 2007 Cat School 2 vol.1 - The guardian of the sun's sword with Kim Jin-Kyung (Munhakdongne) ISBN 978-89-546-3205-8
  - 2007 NOUVELLES AVENTURES DE L'ECOLE DES CHATS 1 – DEFENSEURS (Pilippe picquier, France) ISBN 9782877309738
- 2005 Yeong-I’s Plastic Umbrella with Yoon Dong-jae (Changbi) ISBN 89-364-5409-9
  - 2010 O guarda-chuva verde (EDICOES SM, Brazil) ISBN 9788576757429
  - 2008 Le Parapluie Vert (Didier Jeunesse, France) ISBN 9782278058785
  - 2006 ヨンイのビニールがさ (岩崎書店, Japan) ISBN 4-265-06814-6
- 2003 How did monks live in the past with Kim Jong-sang (bluebirdchild) ISBN 89-7057-664-9
  - 2008 Graine de Bouddha (Pilippe picquier, France) ISBN 9782809700534
- 2002 Cat School 5 - Mountain of the Soul with Kim Jin-Kyung (Munhakdongne) ISBN 978-89-546-8636-5
  - 2006 L'ECOLE DES CHATS 5 - MONTAGNE DES AMES (Pilippe picquier, France) ISBN 9782877309066
- 2001 Cat School 4 - I'll be in your eyes with Kim Jin-Kyung (Munhakdongne) ISBN 978-89-546-8635-8
  - 2006 L'ECOLE DES CHATS 4 - JE TE SAUVERAI DES TENEBRES (Pilippe picquier, France) ISBN 9782877308786
- 2001 Cat School 3 - Prophecy Started with Kim Jin-Kyung (Munhakdongne) ISBN 978-89-546-8634-1
- 2001 Cat School 2 - Magical Gift with Kim Jin-Kyung (Munhakdongne) ISBN 978-89-546-2670-5
- 2001 Cat School 1 - The Secret of the Crystal Cave with Kim Jin-Kyung (Munhakdongne) ISBN 978-89-546-8632-7
  - 2006 L'ECOLE DES CHATS - VOLUMES 1, 2 ET 3 (Pilippe picquier, France) ISBN 9782877309769
