= Petite bibliothèque ronde =

Coordinates: 48.786078°N 2.247064°E

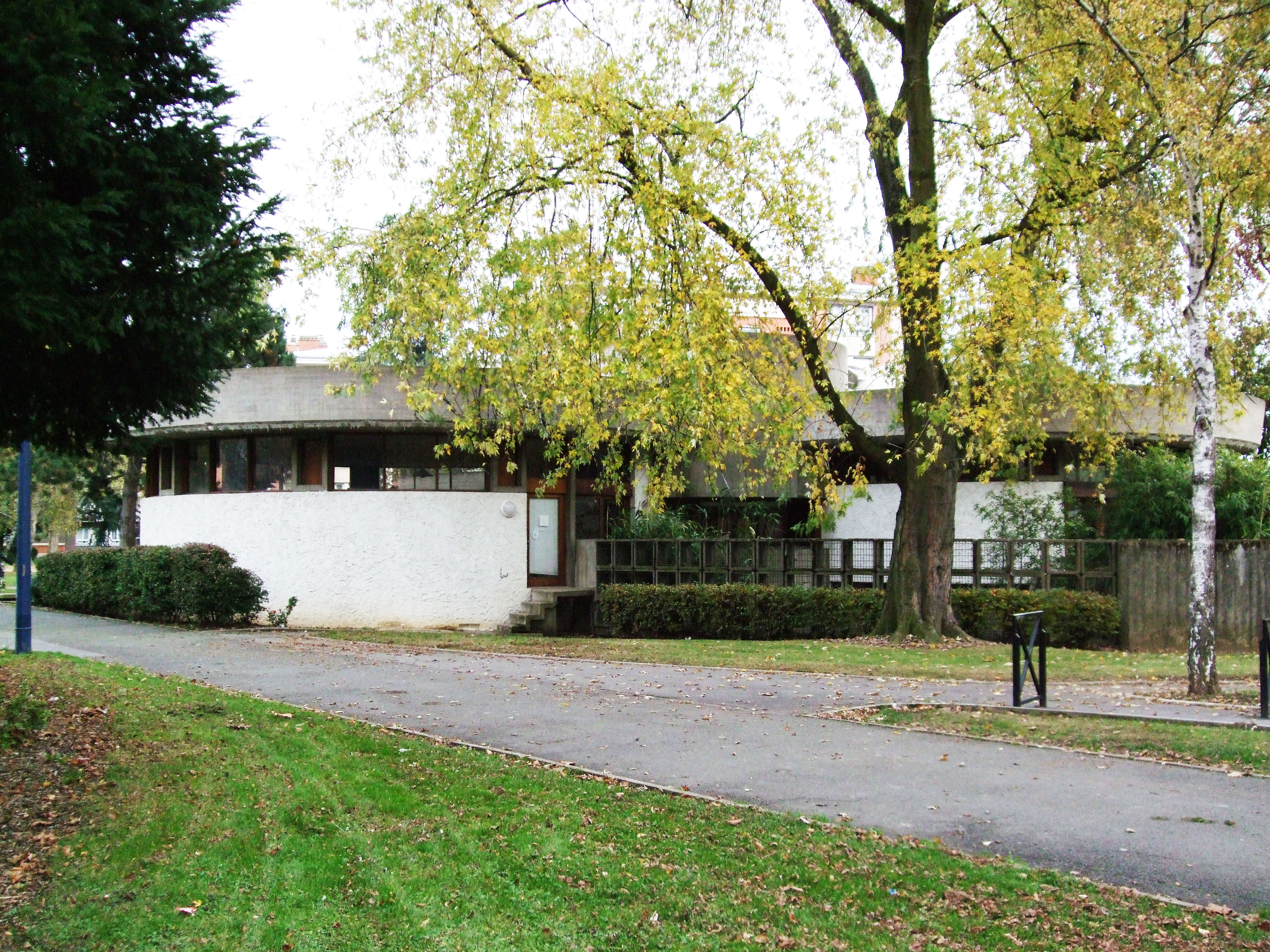
La Petite Bibliothèque Ronde

La Petite Bibliothèque Ronde (“Little Round Library”) is a French children's library. It was funded by the association La Joie par les livres and located in a working-class area in Clamart. Since September 2009, it has been classified as an “Historic Monument” and hence protected by the State.

== History ==
This Library was opened in 1965 thanks to the sponsorship of Anne Gruner-Schlumberger. The building was conceived by the architects Gérard Thurnauer, Jean Renaudie, Jean-Louis Véret and Pierre Riboulet, who were part of l’Atelier de Montrouge. This Library is really atypical with its round rooms and round shelves against the wall. And this creates an impressive contrast with the high buildings in the area. For this originality, the building was classified Historic Monument in 2009. Most of the furniture has been designed by Alvar Aalto. Since it has been classified, it is protected as well as the building itself.

For these peculiarities, the photographer Martine Franck made a report for Life Magazine and the Japanese Empress came to visit the library. Recently, the French magazine specialized in architecture, Connaissance des arts, published an article about the round forms of the library. Moreover, students, who work on architecture, often come to observe the Library as well as pupils.

In 1972, the Library was funded by the State which supported the association La Joie par les livres ("Joy through books"). This latter became the national center for children books (Centre national du livre pour enfants). On 1 January 1997, the Library started to depend on the Ministry of Culture.

In February 2006, the Library closed and it created the reaction of the people living around and especially the association “Pour que vivent nos cités!” They stayed in the place and after two weeks of negotiations, the library opened again. Since April 2007, “La petite bibliothèque ronde”, which is now managed by the association from the same name, became an « experimental cultural laboratory ». The association is now directed by Geneviève Patte and then Olivier Ponsoye.

== Nowadays ==
Sit down and listen carefully: you enter a place where children of the area can join and read books or listen to stories told by the librarians. The aim is to promote the self-development of children into culture facts through books and digital media. The association and the dynamic team of librarians work “Beyond the walls” to encourage the taste of reading. The Library is opened to the children nearly every day of the week even on Sunday. Nationally as well as internationally, the librarians develop partnerships with associations, editors, authors and foundations to promote reading and arts. The library is led by a guidance board, which is composed of children and books specialists.

== See also ==
- List of libraries in France
