= Seo Yeong-eun =

South Korean writer (born 1943)

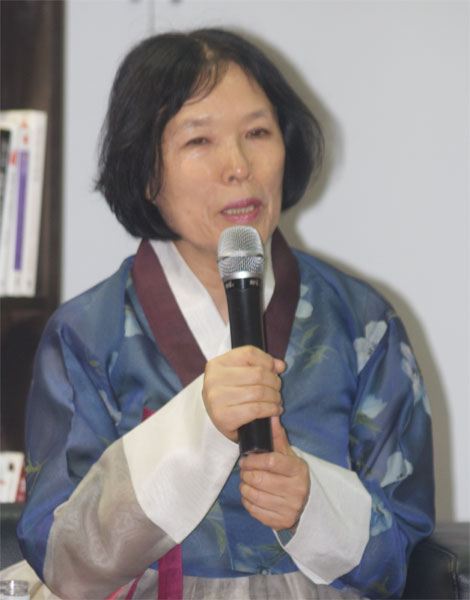
- At SIBF 2014
- Born: May 18, 1943 (age 83)
- Writing career
- Language: Korean

Korean name
- Hangul: 서영은
- Hanja: 徐永恩
- RR: Seo Yeongeun
- MR: Sŏ Yŏngŭn

Childhood name
- Hangul: 서보영
- Hanja: 徐保永
- RR: Seo Boyeong
- MR: Sŏ Poyŏng

Seo Yeong-eun (Korean: 서영은; born May 18, 1943) is a South Korean writer.

== Life ==
Born in Gangneung, Gangwon-do, Seo graduated from Gangneung Teacher Training School in 1961 and entered Konkuk University in 1963 to study English Language and Literature. However she left the university in 1965. In 1968, her short story, "Bridge" (Gyo) was accepted for publication by World of Thoughts (Sasanggye) and the following year, "I and 'I'" (Nawa 'na') was published in Monthly Literature (Wolgan munhak). She also worked as an editor for Literature and Thought (Munhaksasang) and reported for Korean Literature (Hanguk munhak), under the editorship of Lee Mungu. In 1983, she published a novella, The Distant Other, which won the Yi Sang Literary Award.

== Works in translation ==
- A Walk in the Mountains

== Works in Korean (partial) ==
Short story collections

- How To Cross a Desert (1977)
- A Festival of Flesh and Bones (Sal gwa ppyeoui chukje, 1978)
- Tagger, Tagger (1981)
- Golden Feather (Hwanggeum gitteol, 1984)
- The End of the River (Gangmurui kkeut, 1984)
- A Window with a Ladder (Sadariga noin chang, 1990)
- From Road to Oceanside (Gireseo badatkaro, 1992)
- From Dream Road to Dream Road (Kkumgireseo kkeumgillo, 1995).

== Awards ==
- Yi Sang Literature Prize for her short story "The Distant Other" (1983)
- Yeonam Literary Prize for A Window with a Ladder (1990)
