= Noh In-kyung =

South Korean illustrator

- Born: 1980 (age 45–46); Seoul, South Korea
- Occupations: Author, illustrator
- Writing career
- Language: Korean
- Genre: Picture Books
- Website: www.tumblr.com/inkyungnoh

Noh In-kyung (Korean: 노인경) is a South Korean author and illustrator. Her first book was The Train and the Fish in 2006. In 2012, she was named Illustrator of the Year at the Bologna Children's Book Fair for Soso Cancellina. In 2013, she won the Golden Apple Award at the Biennial of Illustration Bratislava for Mr. Tutti and the 100 Water Drops. In 2019, Breathing was selected for IBBY's Silent Book collection.

== Biography ==
Noh was born in 1980 in Seoul, South Korea. While studying at the Department of Visual Design at Hongik University, she began working in picture book publishing at the recommendation of Professor Jeong Byeonggyu. She studied in Italy from 2004, and received a master's degree in Graphics from Accademia di belle arti di Milano. She made her debut as a picture book artist in 2006 through The Train and the Fish. Her works include Mr. Tutti and the 100 Water Drops, Hedgehog X, Mr. Bear's Chair, Breathing, and The King with Donkey Ears,Breathing and I Love You NoNo Boy.

She was named Illustrator of the Year at the 2012 Bologna Children's Book Fair for her graduation project Soso Cancellina. In 2013, she won the Golden Apple Award at the Biennial of Illustration Bratislava. Her first child was born in 2015.

== Awards ==
- 2012 Selected as Illustrator of the Year at the Bologna Children's Book Fair - Soso Cancellina
- 2013 BIB Golden Plaque Award - Mr. Tutti and the 100 Water Drops
- 2019 Selected for IBBY's Silent Book collection - Breathing

== Works ==
- 2022 The King with Donkey Ears (Munhakdongne Publishing Group)ISBN 978-89-546-8548-1
- 2018 Breathing (Munhakdongne Publishing Group)ISBN 978-89-546-5291-9
- 2017 I Am a Plastic Bag (Munhakdongne Publishing Group)ISBN 978-89-01-21721-5
- 2016 Mr. Bear's Chair (Munhakdongne Publishing Group)ISBN 978-89-546-4231-6
  - 2017 Monsieur Papa et les 100 gouttes d'eau (Rue du monde, France)ISBN 9782355043284
  - 2018 熊先生的椅子 (青林, Taiwan)ISBN 9789862743669
- 2014 Hedgehog X (Munhakdongne Publishing Group)ISBN 978-89-546-2577-7
- 2012 Mr. Tutti and the 100 Water Drops (Munhakdongne Publishing Group)ISBN 978-89-546-1861-8
- 2010 Soso Cancellina (Munhakdongne Publishing Group)ISBN 978-89-546-1352-1
- 2006 The Train and the Fish (Munhakdongne Publishing Group)ISBN 89-546-0114-6
