= Choi Eunmi =

South Korean novelist

Choi Eunmi (The romanization preferred by the author according to LTI Korea ) (최은미; born 1978) is a South Korean novelist. She incorporates Buddhist cosmology into her fiction; in Choi's view, people are no different than animals that follow instinct over reason, or hungry ghosts characterized by stinginess, greed, and jealousy. The world where such people live and interact with one another, as Choi sees it, is hell. Her second short story collection Mokryeon jeongjeon (목련정전 Lotus Canon) is a portrayal of hell told like an old folk tale. The title piece "Mokryeon jeongjeon" draws on Buddhist themes, having been adapted into a short story from the Buddhist scripture Lotus Sutra.

Book reviewer Geum Jeong-yeon objects to seeing Choi's fictional realm as a kind of survival-of-the-fittest natural world that existed before the dawn of civilization:

"But that cannot be a sufficient answer; humans are animals, but nature is not hell. What creates hell is therefore not our animal side but our human side—things like our ability to think, use language, build relationships, and create societies. If these are the source of our damnation, then there can be no salvation. We have no choice but to live in hell because we are human. Does this sound like a trap to you? There is no need to raise the alarm, however. This is (of course) a novel, and Choi is a bit of a mischievous writer who enjoys pushing her characters into her elaborately designed hell and observing how they fare. But don’t let your guard down either. You'll realize that the hells of reality depicted by the nine short stories in Mokyreon jeongjeon are scenes you’ve already seen several times elsewhere. That is, here, in twenty-first-century South Korea. If you find Choi's version of hell shocking, that’s probably why."

== Life ==
Choi Eunmi was born in 1978 in Inje County, Gangwon Province, South Korea. She studied history at Dongguk University. She made her literary debut in 2008 when her short story "Ulgo ganda" (울고 간다 I Cry and Go) won the Hyundae Literary Award for New Writers. From her early twenties, she took undergraduate classes in novel writing and theory, and began practicing to write. After graduating university she worked for a publisher and for the Jogye Order Buddhist Studies Institute as a researcher. During her time at the institute, Choi recounts reading banghamrok, which are records of zen meditations performed by various monks, and being fascinated by the footnotes and scribbles that gave her insight into the monks’ lives. She also interviewed eminent monks while compiling records on contemporary and modern Buddhist history. Choi stated in an interview that a dominant theme in her novels is avidya, a Buddhist term describing the conditions that restrict and agonize a person's life, and that she wants to write about people who suffer and love because of avidya.

== Writing ==
Choi's novels may be seen as tragedies in the Aristotelian sense, or as depictions of hell in the Buddhist sense. Either way, what should be noted is how she portrays the world as a place of suffering. In the afterword to Choi's first short story collection Neomu areumdaun kkum (너무 아름다운 꿈 A Dream Too Beautiful), literary critic Gwon Hui-cheol discusses tragedy:

"Choi Eunmi's novels deserve to be hailed as superb works of tragedy. But one must not misunderstand the term 'tragedy' . . . Tragedy is not an art of resignation for the weak. It explores the subjects of sadness, pain, or adversity only to see if they can be repeated or made positive. By turning those subjects into something positive, can life be enriched? Can life's treasure box finally be opened? Tragedy is an art that tests one’s will or drive to ask such questions . . . Choi Eunmi's novels initially seem like they were written in the belief that life is equivalent to receiving a guilty verdict. But the stories eventually lead to finding ‘a dream too beautiful’ and uncovering life's innocence and joys, which is precisely what makes them successful tragedies. Perhaps Choi's novels prove that reading tragedy is an attempt to turn moments of sadness and languor steeped in nihilism into joy and vigor—that is, to live life fully. We read tragedy to keep on living."

Critic Kim Hyeong-jung, who wrote the afterword to Choi's second short story collection, points out two characteristics of her novels. First, Kim observes that she often employs old literary forms such as myths, legends, or fairy tales. Her forte, according to Kim, is to "borrow from traditional genres like folklore or fairy tales, introduce changes to them, and in doing so, make their conventions, narrative forms, ideologies, etc. feel unconventional." Second, Kim argues that Choi's fictional universe is hellish: "Ultimately, the hell that Choi Eunmi has built does not seem to have any exits. It has been predetermined on several levels—structurally, biologically, and psychologically. And that world resembles Avīci, because being 'predetermined' entails that any other possibilities are ruled out."

== Works ==
- 『목련정전』, 문학과지성사, 2015년, ISBN 9788932027951 { Lotus Canon. Moonji, 2015. }
- 『너무 아름다운 꿈』, 문학동네, 2013년, ISBN 9788954621021 { A Dream Too Beautiful. Munhakdongne, 2013. }

== Awards ==
- 2017: Munhakdongne Young Writers' Award for "Nuneuro mandeun saram" (눈으로 만든 사람 A Person Made from Snow)
- 2015: Munhakdongne Young Writers' Award for "Chang neomo gyeoul" (창 너머 겨울 Winter Beyond the Window)
- 2014: Munhakdongne Young Writers' Award for "Geunlin" (근린 Vicinity)
- 2008: Hyundae Literary Award for New Writers for "Ulgo ganda" (울고 간다 I Cry and Go)
