= Oh Seung-min =

South Korean illustrator (born 1974)

- Born: 1974 (age 50–51); Yeongam, South Jeolla Province, South Korea
- Occupation: Picture book author, illustrator
- Language: Korean
- Genre: Picture Books, illustration
- Notable works: Hide and Seek, Myung-Hee's Picture Book, Today is Tonkatsu and Curried Rice, I am An Jung-Geun, The Red God

Oh Seung-min (오승민; born 1974) is a South Korean illustrator. She received the Second Prize at the NOMA Concours for Children's Picture Book Illustrations with Hide and Seek. Ugly Baby Duck was selected for the Biennial of Illustrations Bratislava (BIB) in 2007. Oh was also chosen as an illustrator representing the Korean Pavilion at the Bologna Children's Book Fair with The Song of Aggabi in 2009. Her best-known works other than the above include Myung-Hee's Picture Book, Today is Tonkatsu and Curried Rice, I am An Jung-Geun, and The Red God.

== Style ==
Oh Seung-min employs a variety of styles depending on the genre she is working with. Since she thinks that the role of images in a book is not to adorn the text but to serve as a guide in conveying the story visually, she tries to choose a style of drawing that best fits the subject matter and theme of each book. This results in an array of different styles. For instance, Today is Tonkatsu and Curried Rice, a work that depicts the emotional turmoil of a child with ADHD, was mostly produced using computer graphics. She deftly handles an emotionally charged topic by using the color blue to convey the child's emotions amidst a background of black-and-white mentality that labels children as either good or bad. The Red God takes on the serious subject of animal testing through the eyes of a mouse. Life and death as well as despair and redemption are rendered in vivid colors. In My Doksan-Dong, which was selected as a KBBY Recommended Book, Oh uses oil pastels and paints to capture how the rough but heartwarming neighborhood used to look like in the 1980s, and the lives contained within.

== Works as writer and illustrator ==
- 2022 The Red God (Manmanhan Books) ISBN 979-11-89499-58-7
- 2022 The Tree that Fled the War (Hanullim Kids) ISBN 979-11-63931-19-5
- 2022 Ruho the Tiger (Changbi) ISBN 978-89-36443-23-8
- 2021 Today is Tonkatsu and Curried Rice (Hanullim Special) ISBN 978-89-93143-94-2
- 2016 Alice's Wonderful Hair Salon (Kossum) ISBN 978-89-5876-203-4
- 2004 Hide and Seek (Nurimbo) ISBN 9788958760016

== Collaborations with other authors ==
- 2020 The Secret of Yeondong-Dong (Changbi) ISBN 9788936443108
- 2019 My Doksan-Dong (Moonji) ISBN 9788932035451
- 2019 I am An Jung-Geun (Wisdom House) ISBN 978-89-6247-253-0
- 2008 Myung-Hee's Picture Book (Borim) ISBN 978-89-433-0720-2
  - 2011 Mias Traumbär (aracari verlag, Switzerland) ISBN 9783905945225
- 2007 Red, Red, What Kind of Red? (Sigong Junior) ISBN 978-89-527-5065-5
  - 2007 Rojo, rojo, ¿qué es rojo? (Altea, Mexico) ISBN 978-6071124456
- 2007 Chasing, Fleeing, Searching, Hiding (Woongjin Junior) ISBN 978-89-01-06310-2
  - 2007 咚咚咚咚, 敲响科学的门 自然科学 动物的生存本领 (百花洲文艺出 版社, China) ISBN 9787550042704
- 2006 The Song of Aggabi (Nurimbo) ISBN 89-5876-041-9
- 2005 Ugly Baby Duck (Woongjin Junior) ISBN 9788901049601
