= List of Korean given names =

This is a list of Korean given names, in Hangul alphabetical order. See Korean name § Given names for an explanation. For demographic data, see List of the most popular given names in South Korea.

== List ==
- Ga-young (가영)
- Ga-eun (가은)
- Ga-eul (가을)
- Ga-in (가인)
- Kang-hyun (강현)
- Kang-min (강민)
- Gun (건)
- Kun-woo (건우)
- Kyung (경)
- Kyung-gu (경구)
- Kyung-lim (경림)
- Kyung-mo (경모)
- Kyung-min (경민)
- Kyung-seok (경석)
- Kyung-sun (경선)
- Kyung-soo (경수)
- Kyung-sook (경숙)
- Kyung-ah (경아)
- Kyung-ok (경옥)
- Kyung-wan (경완)
- Kyung-won (경원)
- Kyung-ja (경자)
- Kyung-jae (경재)
- Kyung-ju (경주)
- Kyung-joon (경준)
- Kyung-chul (경철)
- Kyung-tae (경태)
- Kyung-taek (경택)
- Kyung-ho (경호)
- Kyung-hwa (경화)
- Kyung-hwan (경환)
- Kyung-hee (경희)
- Go-eun (고은)
- Kwang (광)
- Kwang-min (광민)
- Kwang-seok (광석)
- Kwang-seon (광선)
- Kwang-su (광수)
- Kwang-sik (광식)
- Kwang-il (광일)
- Kwang-jo (광조)
- Kwang-hyok (광혁)
- Kwang-hyun (광현)
- Kwang-ho (광호)
- Kwang-hwan (광환)
- Kwang-hoon (광훈)
- Kwang-hee (광희)
- Gyuri (규리)
- Kyu-won (규원)
- Kyu-jin (규진)
- Kyu-chul (규철)
- Geun (근)
- Geum (금)
- Kum-song (금성)
- Ki-nam (기남)
- Ki-moon (기문)
- Ki-young (기영)
- Ki-woo (기우)
- Gi-ung (기웅)
- Ki-jung (기정)
- Ki-tae (기태)
- Gi-pyo (기표)
- Ki-ha (기하)
- Ki-hoon (기훈)
- Nana (나나)
- Na-rae (나래)
- Nari (나리)
- Na-moo (나무)
- Na-yeon (나연)
- Na-young (나영)
- Nak-won (낙원)
- Nam-kyu (남규)
- Nam-gi (남기)
- Nam-seon (남선)
- Nam-sun (남순)
- Nam-il (남일)
- Nam-joo (남주)
- Nam-jun (남준)
- Noo-ri (누리)
- Da-kyung (다경)
- Da-rae (다래)
- Da-bin (다빈)
- Dasomi (다소미)
- Da-som (다솜)
- Da-in (다인)
- Dahyun (다현)
- Da-hye (다혜)
- Da-hee (다희)
- Dae-sung (대성)
- Dae-won (대원)
- Dae-hyun (대현)
- Dae-hee (대희)
- Deok-su (덕수)
- Deok-cheol (덕철)
- Do-yeon (도연)
- Do-yeong (도영)
- Do-won (도원)
- Do-hyun (도현)
- Do-hun (도훈)
- Do-hee (도희)
- Dong-gun (동건)
- Dong-geun (동근)
- Dong-seok (동석)
- Dong-soo (동수)
- Dong-young (동영)
- Dong-woo (동우)
- Dong-wook (동욱)
- Dong-won (동원)
- Dong-il (동일)
- Dong-joo (동주)
- Dong-jun (동준)
- Dong-chan (동찬)
- Dong-chul (동철)
- Dong-ha (동하)
- Dong-hyuk (동혁)
- Dong-hyun (동현)
- Dong-hoon (동훈)
- Duri (두리)
- Lu-da (루다)
- Ryujin (류진)
- Man-seok (만석)
- Man-su (만수)
- Man-sik (만식)
- Man-hee (만희)
- Myung (명)
- Myung-soo (명수)
- Myung-sook (명숙)
- Myung-soon (명순)
- Myung-ok (명옥)
- Myung-yong (명용)
- Myung-jun (명준)
- Myung-hwa (명화)
- Myung-hwan (명환)
- Myung-hoon (명훈)
- Myung-hee (명희)
- Mu-yeol (무열)
- Mu-young (무영)
- Moon (문)
- Moon-soo (문수)
- Moon-sik (문식)
- Mi-kyung (미경)
- Mina (미나, 민아)
- Mi-ran (미란)
- Mi-rae (미래)
- Mi-sun (미선)
- Mi-sook (미숙)
- Mi-yeon (미연)
- Mi-young (미영)
- Mi-ja (미자)
- Mi-jung (미정)
- Mi-hee (미희)
- Min (민)
- Min-kyung (민경)
- Min-kyu (민규)
- Min-ki (민기)
- Min-seo (민서)
- Min-seok (민석)
- Min-sun (민선)
- Min-soo (민수)
- Min-young (민영)
- Min-woo (민우)
- Min-jae (민재)
- Min-jung (민정)
- Min-ju (민주)
- Min-jun (민준)
- Min-ji (민지)
- Min-chul (민철)
- Min-hyuk (민혁)
- Minhyong (민형)
- Min-ho (민호)
- Min-hee (민희)
- Beom-seok (범석)
- Beom-soo (범수)
- Byung-woo (병우)
- Byung-wook (병욱)
- Byung-joon (병준)
- Byeong-cheol (병철)
- Byeong-heon (병헌)
- Byung-ho (병호)
- Byung-hoon (병훈)
- Byung-hee (병희)
- Bo-kyung (보경)
- Bo-ra (보라)
- Bo-ram (보람)
- Bo-reum (보름)
- Bo-yeon (보연)
- Bo-young (보영)
- Bok-hee (복희)
- Bomsori (봄소리)
- Bit-na (빛나)
- Sa-rang (사랑)
- Sandara (산다라)
- Sang (상)
- Sang-mi (상미)
- Sang-woo (상우)
- Sang-wook (상욱)
- Sang-won (상원)
- Sang-eun (상은)
- Sang-jun (상준)
- Sang-cheol (상철)
- Sang-hyun (상현)
- Sang-hoon (상훈)
- Seo-yeon (서연)
- Seo-yun (서윤)
- Seo-jun (서준)
- Seo-hyeon (서현)
- Seok (석)
- Seok-min (석민)
- Suk-won (석원)
- Seok-ju (석주)
- Seok-ho (석호)
- Seon (선)
- Seon-ho (선호)
- Seon-mi (선미)
- Sun-young (선영)
- Seon-ok (선옥)
- Sun-woo (선우)
- Sun-hye (선혜)
- Sun-hwa (선화)
- Sun-hee (선희)
- Seong (성)
- Sung-kyung (성경)
- Sung-keun (성근)
- Sung-ki (성기)
- Seong-nam (성남)
- Seong-dong (성동)
- Sung-mo (성모)
- Sung-mi (성미)
- Sung-min (성민)
- Sung-bin (성빈)
- Seong-su (성수)
- Sung-sook (성숙)
- Sung-yong (성용)
- Sung-woo (성우)
- Sung-won (성원)
- Sung-il (성일)
- Seong-ja (성자)
- Sung-jae (성재)
- Sung-jin (성진)
- Sung-chul (성철)
- Sung-ha (성하)
- Seong-han (성한)
- Sung-hyun (성현)
- Sung-ho (성호)
- Seong-hoon (성훈)
- Sung-hee (성희)
- Sung-joon (성준)
- Se-bin (세빈)
- Se-yeon (세연)
- Se-young (세영)
- Se-yoon (세윤)
- Se-hun (세훈)
- Se-mi (세미)
- So (소)
- Sora (소라)
- So-eun (소은)
- So-yeon (소연)
- So-young (소영)
- So-won (소원)
- So-yi (소이)
- So-hyun (소현)
- So-hye (소혜)
- So-hee (소희)
- Song-hwa (송화)
- Soo (수)
- Soo-kyung (수경)
- Soo-geun (수근)
- Su-mi (수미)
- Soo-min (수민)
- Soo-bin (수빈)
- Soo-ah (수아)
- Soo-yeon (수연)
- Soo-young (수영)
- Soo-jung (수정)
- Su-ji (수지)
- Soo-jin (수진)
- Soo-hyun (수현)
- Su-hye (수혜)
- Soo-hee (수희)
- Sook (숙)
- Sook-ja (숙자)
- Soon-young (순영)
- Sun-ok (순옥)
- Soon-ja (순자)
- Soon-chun (순천)
- Soon-hyung (순형)
- Soon-hee (순희)
- Seul-ki (슬기)
- Seung (승)
- Seungkwan (승관)
- Seung-gi (승기)
- Seung-min (승민)
- Seung-su (승수)
- Seung-ah (승아)
- Seung-yeon (승연)
- Seung-yong (승용)
- Seung-woo (승우)
- Seung-won (승원)
- Seung-yoon (승윤)
- Seung-eun (승은)
- Seung-jae (승재)
- Seung-jun (승준)
- Seung-chul (승철)
- Seunghan (승한)
- Seung-heon (승헌)
- Seung-hyun (승현)
- Seung-ho (승호)
- Seung-hwa (승화)
- Seung-hwan (승환)
- Seung-hoon (승훈)
- Seung-hee (승희)
- Si-yeon (시연)
- Si-young (시영)
- Zi-on (시온)
- Si-woo (시우)
- Si-won (시원)
- Si-eun (시은)
- Si-hyuk (시혁)
- Si-hyun (시현)
- Shin-young (신영)
- Shin-hye (신혜)
- Ah-reum (아름)
- Ae-jung (애정)
- Eon (언)
- Yeo-jin (여진)
- Yeon (연)
- Yeon-seok (연석)
- Yeon-woo (연우)
- Yeon-hee (연희)
- Yol (열)
- Young (영)
- Yeong-guk (영국)
- Young-geun (영근)
- Yeong-gi (영기)
- Yong-gil (영길)
- Yeong-nam (영남)
- Young-mi (영미)
- Young-min (영민)
- Young-sam (영삼)
- Young-soo (영수)
- Young-sook (영숙)
- Young-sik (영식)
- Young-shin (영신)
- Young-ae (영애)
- Yeong-ok (영옥)
- Young-wook (영욱)
- Young-ja (영자)
- Young-jae (영재)
- Young-joo (영주)
- Young-jun (영준)
- Young-jin (영진)
- Young-chul (영철)
- Young-tae (영태)
- Young-ha (영하)
- Young-ho (영호)
- Young-hwan (영환)
- Young-hoon (영훈)
- Young-hee (영희)
- Ye-rin (예린)
- Ye-bin (예빈)
- Ye-seo (예서)
- Ye-won (예원)
- Ye-eun (예은)
- Ye-jun (예준)
- Ye-ji (예지)
- Ye-jin (예진)
- O-kyu (오규)
- Oh-seong (오성)
- Ok (옥)
- Yo-han (요한)
- Yong (용)
- Yong-guk (용국)
- Yong-gi (용기)
- Yong-nam (용남)
- Yong-dae (용대)
- Yong-bok (용복)
- Yong-joon (용준)
- Yong-jin (용진)
- Yong-ho (용호)
- Yong-hwa (용화)
- Woo (우)
- Woo-sung (우성)
- Woo-young (우영)
- Woo-jin (우진)
- Woong (웅)
- Won (원)
- Won-sik (원식)
- Won-young (원영)
- Won-yong (원용)
- Won-woo (원우)
- Won-il (원일)
- Won-jae (원재)
- Won-chul (원철)
- Won-ho (원호)
- Won-hee (원희)
- Yoo-gun (유건)
- Yoo-kyung (유경)
- Yuna (유나, 윤아)
- Yu-ri (유리)
- Yumi (유미)
- Yu-bin (유빈)
- Yoo-suk (유석)
- Yoo-jung (유정)
- Yu-jin (유진)
- Yun-seo (윤서)
- Yun-seok (윤석)
- Yoon-sung (윤성)
- Yun-suk (윤숙)
- Yoon-jung (윤정)
- Yun-hyeong (윤형)
- Yoon-ho (윤호)
- Yun-hui (윤희)
- Eun (은)
- Eun-kyung (은경)
- Eun-mi (은미)
- Eun-byul (은별)
- Eun-bi (은비)
- Eun-bin (은빈)
- Eun-sang (은상)
- Eun-seo (은서)
- Eun-sung (은성)
- Eun-soo (은수)
- Eun-sook (은숙)
- Eun-ah (은아)
- Eun-young (은영)
- Eun-woo (은우)
- Eun-jae (은재)
- Eun-jung (은정)
- Eun-ju (은주)
- Eun-ji (은지)
- Eun-jin (은진)
- Eun-chae (은채)
- Eun-ha (은하)
- Eun-hye (은혜)
- Eun-hee (은희)
- Yi-kyung (이경)
- Yi-soo (이수)
- Yi-seul (이슬)
- In (인)
- In-soo (인수)
- In-sook (인숙)
- In-sik (인식)
- In-young (인영)
- In-hye (인혜)
- Il (일)
- Il-sung (일성)
- Jang-mi (장미)
- Jae (재)
- Jae-kyung (재경)
- Jae-gyu (재규)
- Jae-geun (재근)
- Jae-myung (재명)
- Jae-min (재민)
- Jae-beom (재범)
- Jae-suk (재석)
- Jae-seop (재섭)
- Jae-sung (재성)
- Jae-shin (재신)
- Jae-young (재영)
- Jae-yong (재용)
- Jae-woo (재우)
- Jae-wook (재욱)
- Jae-woong (재웅)
- Jae-won (재원)
- Jae-yoon (재윤)
- Jae-eun (재은)
- Jae-in (재인)
- Jae-joon (재준)
- Jae-jin (재진)
- Jae-chul (재철)
- Jae-hyuk (재혁)
- Jae-hyun (재현)
- Jae-ho (재호)
- Jae-hoon (재훈)
- Jae-hui (재희)
- Jeong (정)
- Jung-nam (정남)
- Jung-myung (정명)
- Jung-mo (정모)
- Jung-min (정민)
- Jung-soo (정수)
- Jung-sook (정숙)
- Jung-soon (정순)
- Jeong-sik (정식)
- Jung-ah (정아)
- Jung-woo (정우)
- Jung-won (정원)
- Jeong-eun (정은)
- Jung-in (정인)
- Jung-il (정일)
- Jeong-ja (정자)
- Jung-jin (정진)
- Jung-han (정한)
- Jung-hyuk (정혁)
- Jung-hyun (정현)
- Jeong-ho (정호)
- Jung-hwa (정화)
- Jung-hwan (정환)
- Jeong-hyo (정효)
- Jung-hoon (정훈)
- Jung-hee (정희)
- Jeno (제노)
- Jong-seok (종석)
- Jong-soo (종수)
- Jong-yul (종열)
- Jong-ok (종옥)
- Jong-won (종원)
- Jong-il (종일)
- Jong-chul (종철)
- Jong-hyuk (종혁)
- Jong-hyun (종현)
- Jong-ho (종호)
- Jong-hun (종훈)
- Ju (주)
- Joo-won (주원)
- Joo-hyun (주현)
- Ju-ho (주호)
- Joo-hwan (주환)
- Joon (준)
- Joon-ki (준기)
- Jun-sang (준상)
- Jun-seo (준서)
- Jun-seok (준석)
- Jun-young (준영)
- Joon-tae (준태)
- Jun-ha (준하)
- Jun-hyeok (준혁)
- Joon-ho (준호)
- Joon-hee (준희)
- Ji (지)
- Jina (지나, 진아)
- Ji-min (지민)
- Ji-seok (지석)
- Ji-sung (지성)
- Ji-soo (지수)
- Ji-an (지안)
- Ji-ae (지애)
- Ji-yeon (지연)
- Ji-young (지영)
- Ji-yong (지용)
- Ji-woo (지우)
- Ji-woon (지운)
- Ji-woong (지웅)
- Ji-won (지원)
- Ji-yoon (지윤)
- Ji-eun (지은)
- Ji-tae (지태)
- Ji-ha (지하)
- Ji-hae (지해)
- Ji-hyun (지현)
- Ji-hye (지혜)
- Ji-ho (지호)
- Ji-hwan (지환)
- Ji-hu (지후)
- Ji-hoon (지훈)
- Jin-gyu (진규)
- Jin-sun (진선)
- Jin-sung (진성)
- Jin-sol (진솔)
- Jin-soo (진수)
- Jin-young (진영)
- Jin-woo (진우)
- Jin-wook (진욱)
- Jin-joo (진주)
- Jin-hyuk (진혁)
- Jin-ho (진호)
- Jin-hwan (진환)
- Jin-hee (진희)
- Jin-kyung (진경)
- Chan (찬)
- Chan-soo (찬수)
- Chan-young (찬영)
- Chan-woo (찬우)
- Chang-min (창민)
- Changbin (창빈)
- Chang-woo (창우)
- Chang-ho (창호)
- Chang-hoon (창훈)
- Chae (채)
- Chaeryeong (채령)
- Chae-min (채민)
- Chae-yeon (채연)
- Chae-young (채영)
- Chae-won (채원)
- Chul (철)
- Cheol-min (철민)
- Chul-soo (철수)
- Chul-soon (철순)
- Chul-woo (철우)
- Chun-ja (춘자)
- Chun-hwa (춘화)
- Chun-hee (춘희)
- Chi-won (치원)
- Tae (태)
- Tae-min (태민)
- Tae-suk (태석)
- Tae-seong (태성)
- Tae-soo (태수)
- Tae-yeon (태연)
- Tae-young (태영)
- Tae-yong (태용)
- Tae-woo (태우)
- Tae-wook (태욱)
- Tae-woong (태웅)
- Tae-won (태원)
- Tae-il (태일)
- Tae-joon (태준)
- Tae-hyun (태현)
- Tae-ho (태호)
- Tae-hee (태희)
- Hana (하나)
- Ha-neul (하늘)
- Ha-sun (하선)
- Ha-young (하영)
- Ha-yoon (하윤)
- Ha-eun (하은)
- Ha-joon (하준)
- Han-na (한나)
- Han-byul (한별)
- Han-bin (한빈)
- Han-sol (한솔)
- Han-jae (한재)
- Haena (해나)
- Haerin (해린)
- Hae-seong (해성)
- Hae-won (해원)
- Hae-il (해일)
- Hae-jin (해진)
- Hae-young (해영)
- Hyuk (혁)
- Hyuk-kyu (혁규)
- Hyuk-soo (혁수)
- Hyuk-jae (혁재)
- Hyun (현)
- Hyun-kyung (현경)
- Hyun-mi (현미)
- Hyun-min (현민)
- Hyun-bin (현빈)
- Hyun-seo (현서)
- Hyun-seok (현석)
- Hyun-soo (현수)
- Hyun-sook (현숙)
- Hyun-sung (현성)
- Hyun-seung (현승)
- Hyun-sik (현식)
- Hyun-a (현아)
- Hyun-woo (현우)
- Hyun-wook (현욱)
- Hyun-jung (현정)
- Hyun-joo (현주)
- Hyun-jun (현준)
- Hyun-jin (현진)
- Hyun-tae (현태)
- Hyun-ho (현호)
- Hyun-hee (현희)
- Hyun-chul (현철)
- Hyun-ji (현지)
- Hyung-min (형민)
- Hyeong-won (형원)
- Hyung-joo (형주)
- Hyung-joon (형준)
- Hye (혜)
- Hye-kyung (혜경)
- Hye-rin (혜린)
- Hye-rim (혜림)
- Hye-mi (혜미)
- Hye-bin (혜빈)
- Hye-sung (혜성)
- Hye-su (혜수)
- Hye-yeon (혜연)
- Hye-young (혜영)
- Hye-won (혜원)
- Hye-in (혜인)
- Hye-ja (혜자)
- Hye-jeong (혜정)
- Hye-jin (혜진)
- Ho (호)
- Ho-sung (호성)
- Ho-young (호영)
- Ho-jung (호정)
- Ho-jun (호준)
- Ho-jin (호진)
- Ho-cheol (호철)
- Hong-gi (홍기)
- Hong-joo (홍주)
- Hwa-young (화영)
- Hwa-yeon (화연)
- Hwan (환)
- Hyo-kyeong (효경)
- Hyo-joo (효주)
- Hyo-jin (효진)
- Hoon (훈)
- Hee (희)
- Hee-kyung (희경)
- Hee-sun (희선)
- Hee-sung (희성)
- Hee-soo (희수)
- Hee-jung (희정)
- Hee-joon (희준)
- Hee-jin (희진)
- Hee-chul (희철)

== See also ==
- Korean name
- List of Korean surnames
- List of most popular given names
