= Jong-ok =

- Hangul: 종옥
- RR: Jongok
- MR: Chongok

Jong-ok is a Korean given name.

People with this name include:

- Ri Jong-ok (1916–1999), North Korean politician
- Choi Jong-ok (born 1945), South Korean volleyball player
- Bae Jong-ok (born 1964), South Korean actress

== See also ==
- List of Korean given names
