= Chi-won =

- Hangul: 치원
- RR: Chiwon
- MR: Ch'iwŏn

Chi-won is a Korean given name.

People with this name include:

- Ch'oe Ch'iwŏn (fl. 857–924), Korean Silla Dynasty philosopher and poet
- Chi-Won Yoon (born 1959), South Korean financier and executive

== See also ==
- List of Korean given names
