= Myung-yong =

- Hangul: 명용
- RR: Myeongyong
- MR: Myŏngyong

Myung-yong is a Korean given name.

People with this name include:

- Yi Myeong-ryong (이명룡, 1873–1956), Korean independence activist, recipient of the Order of Merit for National Foundation
- Choi Myung-yong (born 1976), South Korean football referee
- Yeo Myung-yong (born 1987), South Korean footballer

== See also ==
- List of Korean given names
