= Chae (Korean given name) =

- Hangul: 채
- RR: Chae
- MR: Ch'ae

Chae (Korean: 채), also less commonly spelled Chai, Ch'ae, or Chea, is a Korean given name. Notable people with the name include:

- Yi Ch'ae (born 1616), Joseon Confucian writer
- Yi Ch'ae (born 1700), Joseon scholar-official
- Yi Ch'ae (born 1745), Joseon scholar-official

== See also ==
- List of Korean given names
