= Dong-wook =

- Hangul: 동욱
- RR: Donguk
- MR: Tonguk

Dong-wook is a Korean given name.

People with this name include:

- Song Dong-wook (born 1962), South Korean former tennis player
- JK Kim Dong-wook (born 1975), South Korean singer
- Lee Dong-wook (born 1981), South Korean actor
- Shin Dong-wook (born 1982), South Korean actor
- Kim Dong-wook (born 1983), South Korean actor
- Seven (South Korean singer) (born Choi Dong-wook, 1984), South Korean singer

== See also ==
- List of Korean given names
