= Hye-su =

- Hangul: 혜수
- RR: Hyesu
- MR: Hyesu

Hye-su, also spelled Hye-soo, is a Korean given name.

People with this name include:

- Kim Hye-soo (born 1970), South Korean actress
- Park Hye-soo (born 1994), South Korean actress
- Oh Hye-soo (born 1995), South Korean actress

Fictional characters with this name include:

- Yeo Hye-su, in 2001 South Korean film Bungee Jumping of Their Own

== See also ==
- List of Korean given names
