= Ga-eul =

- Hangul: 가을
- RR: Gaeul
- MR: Kaŭl
- IPA: [kaɯl]

Ga-eul, also spelled Ka-eul, is a Korean given name. The word itself is a native Korean word meaning "autumn" and does not have corresponding hanja. However, since Korean given names can be created arbitrarily, it may also be a name with hanja (e.g. 嘉乙).

== People ==
People with this name include:

- Jeon Ga-eul (born 1988), South Korean football player
- Kim Ga-eul (born 1997), South Korean swimmer
- Gaeul (born 2002), South Korean singer, rapper and dancer, member of Ive

== See also ==
- List of Korean given names
