= Hyeong-won =

- Hangul: 형원
- RR: Hyeongwon
- MR: Hyŏngwŏn

Hyeong-won, Hyung-won, or Hyong-won is a Korean given name.

People with this name include:

- Yu Hyeong-won (1622–1673), Joseon Dynasty scholar-official
- Cha Hyung-won (1890–1972), South Korean traditional stage actor
- Hyungwon (born Chae Hyung-won, 1994), South Korean singer, member of boy band Monsta X

== See also ==
- List of Korean given names
