= Seung-hwa =

- Hangul: 승화
- RR: Seunghwa
- MR: Sŭnghwa

Seung-hwa is a Korean given name.

People with this name include:

- Jeong Seung-hwa (1926–2002), South Korean male general
- Na Seung-hwa (born 1969), South Korean male footballer
- Park Seung-hwa (born 1969), South Korean male singer, member of Yurisangja
- Jung Seung-hwa (born 1981), South Korean male épée fencer

== See also ==
- List of Korean given names
