= Byung-wook =

- Hangul: 병욱
- RR: Byeonguk
- MR: Pyŏnguk

Byung-wook is a Korean given name.

People with this name include:

- Ri Byong-uk (born 1954), North Korean boxer
- Ko Byung-wook (born 1992), South Korean football player

== See also ==
- List of Korean given names
