= Sang-eun =

- Hangul: 상은
- RR: Sangeun
- MR: Sangŭn
- IPA: [saŋɯn]

Sang-eun, also spelled Sang-un, is a Korean given name.

People with this name include:

- Lee Tzsche (born 1970), South Korean female singer-songwriter
- Lee Sang-eun (born 1975), South Korean female handball player
- Oh Sang-eun (born 1977), South Korean male table tennis player
- Kim Sang-eun (born 1978), stage name Lee Ji-ah, South Korean actress

== See also ==
- List of Korean given names
