= Hye-bin =

- Hangul: 혜빈
- RR: Hyebin
- MR: Hyebin

Hye-bin is a Korean given name.

== People ==
People with this name include:

- Jeon Hye-bin (born 1983), South Korean actress and singer

== Fictional characters ==
Fictional characters with this name include:

- Jang Hye-bin, from the 2011 South Korean television series A Thousand Kisses

== See also ==
- List of Korean given names
- Korean name
