= Woo-young =

- Hangul: 우영
- RR: Uyeong
- MR: Uyŏng

Woo-young, also spelled Wooyoung or Woo-yeong, is a Korean given name.

People with this name include:

- Jang Wooyoung (born 1989), South Korean singer
- Jeong Woo-yeong (born 1999), South Korean football player
- Jung Woo-young (born 1989), South Korean football player
- Jung Wooyoung (born 1999), South Korean singer
- Lee Woo-young (born 1973), South Korean football player and manager

== See also ==
- List of Korean given names
