= Jae-eun =

- Hangul: 재은
- RR: Jaeeun
- MR: Chaeŭn
- IPA: [tɕɛɯn]

Jae-eun, also spelled Jae-un, is a Korean given name.

People with this name include:

- Jeong Jae-eun (born 1969), South Korean film director
- Yim Kyung-jin (born Yim Jae-eun, 1978), South Korean badminton player
- Jung Jae-eun (taekwondo) (born 1980), South Korean taekwondo practitioner
- O Jae-eun (born 1983), South Korean alpine skier

== See also ==
- List of Korean given names
