= Kyung-ah =

- Hangul: 경아
- RR: Gyeonga
- MR: Kyŏnga

Kyung-ah, also spelled Kyong-ah, is a Korean given name.

People with this name include:

- Choi Kyung-ah (born 1969), South Korean manhwa artist
- Kim Kyungah (born 1977), South Korean table tennis player
- Park Kyung-ah (born 1986), South Korean artistic gymnast
- Yoon Kyung-ah (fl. 2010s), South Korean screenwriter
- Kim Kyong-a, North Korean rower, participated in Rowing at the 2010 Asian Games – Women's lightweight single sculls

== See also ==
- List of Korean given names
