= Eun-sang =

- Hangul: 은상
- RR: Eunsang
- MR: Ŭnsang
- IPA: [ɯnsaŋ]

Eun-sang, also spelled Un-sang, is a Korean given name.

People with this name include:

- Lee Eun-sang (poet) (1903–1982), Korean poet and historian
- Lee Eun-sang (singer) (born 2002), South Korean singer, former member of X1

Fictional characters with this name include:

- Cha Eun-sang, in 2013 South Korean television series The Heirs

== See also ==
- List of Korean given names
