= Hyun-ji =

- Hangul: 현지
- RR: Hyeonji
- MR: Hyŏnji

Hyun-ji (Korean: 세미) is a Korean given name. As of 2026, the name ranked 4,176th out of 36,179 male names and 130th out of 28,726 female names. A total of 4,955 people, consisting of 24 males and 4,931 females, were born with the name from 2008 to 2026.

Notable people with the name include:

- Yoon Hyun-ji, South Korean judoka
- Lee Hyun-ji, South Korean former singer

Fictional characters include:

- Kim Hyun-ji, portrayed by Kim So-hyun, the female protagonist from Bring It On, Ghost

== See also ==
- List of Korean given names
