= Gi-ung =

- Hangul: 기웅
- RR: Giung
- MR: Kiung

Gi-ung or Ki-woong is a Korean given name.

People with this name include:

- Bae Ki-woong (born 1974), South Korean boxer
- Park Ki-woong (born 1985), South Korean actor

== See also ==
- List of Korean given names
