= Kyu-chul =

- Hangul: 규철
- RR: Gyucheol
- MR: Kyuch'ŏl

Kyu-chul is a Korean given name.

People with this name include:

- Chang Kyou-chul (1946–2000), South Korean boxer
- Kim Kyu-chul (born 1960), South Korean actor, Best New Actor at the 1993 Chunsa Film Art Awards
- Han Kyu-chul (born 1981), South Korean swimmer
- Chang Gyu-cheol (born 1992), South Korean swimmer

== See also ==
- List of Korean given names
