= Man-sik =

- Hangul: 만식
- RR: Mansik
- MR: Mansik

Man-sik, also spelled Man-shik, is a Korean given name.

People with this name include:

- Cho Man-sik (1884–1950), Korean independence activist
- Chae Man-sik (1902–1950), Korean novelist
- Kim Man-sig (1940 or 1942 – 2013), South Korean fencer
- Jung Man-sik (born 1975), South Korean actor

== See also ==
- List of Korean given names
