= Su-hye =

- Hangul: 수혜
- RR: Suhye
- MR: Suhye
- IPA: [suhe]

Su-hye, also spelled Soo-hye, is a Korean given name.

Notable people with this name include:

- Haruka Igawa (born 1976, Cho Su-hye, Cho Yoshie), Japanese actress
- Jang Su-hye (born 1988), South Korean actress, translator, art director

== See also ==
- List of Korean given names
