= Eun-byul =

- Hangul: 은별
- RR: Eunbyeol
- MR: Ŭnbyŏl
- IPA: [ɯnbjʌl]

Eun-byul, also spelled Eun-byeol or Un-byol, is a Korean given name.

People with this name include:

- Jo Eun-byul (born 1982), South Korean singer and actress
- Lee Eun-byul (born 1991), South Korean short track speed skater
- Ho Un-byol (born 1992), North Korean football player

Fictional characters with this name include:

- Go Eun-byul, in 2015 South Korean television series Who Are You: School 2015
- Ha Eun-byeol, in 2020 South Korean television series The Penthouse: War in Life

== See also ==
- List of Korean given names
