= Ho-jun =

- Hangul: 호준
- RR: Hojun
- MR: Hojun

Ho-jun, also spelled Ho-joon, is a Korean given name.

People with this given name include:

- Ri Ho-jun (born 1946), North Korean sports shooter
- Lee Ho-joon (baseball) (born 1976), South Korean baseball player
- Kim Ho-jun (footballer) (born 1984), South Korean footballer
- Son Ho-jun (born 1984), South Korean singer and actor
- Yoo Ho-joon (born 1985), South Korean football player
- Kim Ho-jun (born 1990), South Korean snowboarder

== See also ==
- List of Korean given names
