= Tae-seong =

- Hangul: 태성
- RR: Taeseong
- MR: T'aesŏng

Tae-seong, also spelled Tae-sung or Thae-song, is a Korean given name.

People with this name include:

- Cha Tae-sung (born 1934), South Korean footballer
- Kim Tae-seong (composer) (born 1978), South Korean film and television score composer
- Jang Tae-sung (born 1980), South Korean actor
- Lee Tae-sung (born 1985), South Korean actor
- Kim Tae-seong (footballer) (born 1998), South Korean football midfielder in the United States

Fictional characters with this name include:

- Hong Tae-sung, in 2010 South Korean television series Bad Guy

== See also ==
- List of Korean given names
