= Tae-ho =

- Hangul: 태호
- RR: Taeho
- MR: T'aeho

Tae-ho is a Korean given name.

People with this name include:

- Bak Tae-ho (born 1947), South Korean voice actor
- Lee Tae-ho (born 1961), South Korean footballer
- Kim Tae-ho (born 1962), South Korean politician
- Kim Tae-ho (born 1975), South Korean television director
- Kim Tae-ho, stage name Choi Jin-hyuk (born 1985), South Korean actor

== See also ==
- List of Korean given names
