= Sun-hye =

- Hangul: 선혜
- RR: Seonhye
- MR: Sŏnhye
- IPA: [sʌnhe]

Sun-hye, also spelled Seon-hye, Sun-hae, Sun-hay, is a Korean given name. People with this name include:

- Sunhae Im (born 1976), South Korean soprano
- Kim Sun-hye (born 1973), South Korean voice actress
- Sunhye (born 2001, Hwang Sunhye), South Korean singer, member of SHA SHA
- Sunhye (born 2003, Yang Sun-hye), South Korean actress
- Sunhye (born 2004, Jeong Sunhye), South Korean singer, member of Young Posse

== See also ==
- List of Korean given names
