= Kwang-hwan =

- Hangul: 광환
- RR: Gwanghwan
- MR: Kwanghwan

Kwang-hwan is a Korean given name.

People with this name include:

- Jeon Kwang-hwan (born 1982), South Korean footballer
- Lee Kwang-hwan, baseball manager for the LG Twins in 1992-1994

== See also ==
- List of Korean given names
