= Mu-young =

- Hangul: 무영
- RR: Muyeong
- MR: Muyŏng

Mu-young is a Korean given name.

People with this name include:

- Moo-Young Han (born 1934), South Korean professor of physics at Duke University
- Mu-Young Kim (born 1985), South Korean baseball pitcher
- Kim Moo-young (born 1986), legal name since 2014 of Juno (singer), South Korean singer

Fictional characters with this name include:

- Mu-young, in 2012 South Korean television series Arang and the Magistrate
- Park Mu-young, in 1999 South Korean film Shiri

== See also ==
- List of Korean given names
