= Min-ki =

- Hangul: 민기
- RR: Mingi
- MR: Min'gi

Min-ki is a Korean given name.

People with this name include:

- Ren (South Korean singer) (born Choi Min-gi, 1995), South Korean singer, member of NU'EST
- Jo Min-ki (1965–2018), South Korean actor
- Kim Min-ki (born 1951), South Korean singer, composer, and playwright
- Lee Min-ki (born 1985), South Korean actor and singer
- Song Mingi (born 1999), South Korean singer, rapper, songwriter, member of ATEEZ

== See also ==
- List of Korean given names
