= Jin-kyung =

- Hangul: 진경
- RR: Jingyeong
- MR: Chin'gyŏng

Jin-kyung (Korean: 진경) is a Korean given name. As of 2026, the name ranked 3,653rd out of 36,179 male names and 859th out of 28,726 female names. A total of 324 people, consisting of 32 males and 292 females, were born with the name from 2008 to 2026.

Notable people with the name include:

- Hong Jin-kyung, South Korean entrepreneur, model, host, comedian and actress
- Kim Jin-kyung, South Korean actress and model
- Park Jin-kyung, stage name Wooyeon, South Korean actress and singer. Member of South Korean girl group Wooah
- Lee Jin-kyung, known by the stage name Lee Sun-bin, South Korean actress and singer
- Kim Jin-kyung (author), South Korean author

== See also ==
- List of Korean given names
