= Seong (Korean given name) =

- Hangul: 성
- RR: Seong
- MR: Sŏng

Seong (Korean: 성), also spelled Song or Sung, is a Korean given name. Notable people with the name include:

- Chŏng Sŏng (fl. 11th century), Goryeo military commander
- Jin Xing (김성; Kim Sŏng; born 1967), Chinese ballet dancer of Korean descent

== See also ==
- List of Korean given names
