= So-won =

- Hangul: 소원
- RR: Sowon
- MR: Sowŏn
- IPA: [sʰowʌn]

So-won is a Korean given name.

People with this name include:

- Kal So-won (born 2006), South Korean actress

Fictional characters with this name include:

- Im So-won, in 2013 South Korean film Hope

== See also ==
- List of Korean given names
