= Nam-jun =

- Hangul: 남준
- RR: Namjun
- MR: Namjun

Nam-jun, sometimes spelled Nam-joon, is a Korean given name.

== People ==
- Nam June Paik (1932–2006), Korean-American pioneer in video art
- RM (born Kim Nam-joon, 1994), South Korean rapper
- Park Nam-jun (born 1957), South Korean poet

== Fictional characters ==
- Nam-joon, character in the comedy drama film The Last Ride
- Ahn Nam-joon, main character in the television series Sweet Buns
- Kim Nam-joon, main character in the television series Youth
- Kim Nam-joon, main character in the television series Left-Handed Wife

== See also ==
- List of Korean given names
