= Tae-min =

- Hangul: 태민
- RR: Taemin
- MR: T'aemin

Tae-min is a Korean given name.

People with this name include:

- Choi Tae-min (1912–1994), South Korean cult leader
- Kim Tae-min (born 1982), South Korean football player
- Lee Tae-min (footballer) (born 2003), South Korean football player
- Park Tae-min (born 1986), South Korean football player
- Park Tae-min (weightlifter) (born 1967), South Korean weightlifter
- Taemin (born Lee Tae-min, 1993), South Korean musician, member of Shinee

== See also ==
- List of Korean given names
