= Yoo-kyung =

- Hangul: 유경
- RR: Yugyeong
- MR: Yugyŏng

Yoo-kyung is a Korean given name.

People with this name include:

- Jung Yoo-kyung (born 1968), South Korean television screenwriter
- Kim Yoo-kyung (born 1975), South Korean rhythmic gymnast
- Klara Min (born Min Yu-kyoung, c. 1976), South Korean pianist
- Hong Yoo-kyung (born 1994), South Korean singer and dancer

Fictional characters with this name include:

- Jung Yoo-kyung, in 2006 South Korean television series Alone in Love
- Seo Yoo-kyung, in 2010 South Korean television series Pasta

== See also ==
- List of Korean given names
