= Ki-moon =

- Hangul: 기문
- RR: Gimun
- MR: Kimun

Ki-moon, also spelled Gi-mun, is a Korean given name.

People with this name include:

- Ban Ki-moon (born 1944), South Korean diplomat, eighth Secretary General of the United Nations
- Kim Kimoon (born 1954), South Korean chemist
- Kang Gi-mun, South Korean politician; see List of members of the South Korean Constituent Assembly, 1948–50
- Ki-Moon Lee (1930–2020), South Korean linguist

== See also ==
- List of Korean given names
