= Sung-bin =

- Hangul: 성빈
- RR: Seongbin
- MR: Sŏngbin

Sung-bin or Seong-bin is a Korean given name.

People with this name include:

- An Sung-bin (born 1988), South Korean football player
- Yun Sung-bin (born 1994), South Korean skeleton racer
- Beenzino (born Lim Sung-bin, 1987), South Korean rapper

== See also ==
- List of Korean given names
