= Byung-ho =

- Hangul: 병호
- RR: Byeongho
- MR: Pyŏngho

Byung-ho, also spelled Byong-ho or Pyong-ho, is a Korean given name. According to South Korean government data, Byung-ho was the third-most popular name for baby boys in 1940.

People with this name include:

- Jon Pyong-ho (born 1926), North Korean politician
- Son Byong-ho (born 1962), South Korean actor
- Shin Byung-ho (born 1977), South Korean football player
- Park Byung-ho (born 1986), South Korean baseball player

== See also ==
- List of Korean given names
