= Bo-young =

- Hangul: 보영
- RR: Boyeong
- MR: Poyŏng

Bo-young is a Korean given name.

People with this name include:

- Lee Bo-young (born 1979), South Korean actress
- Lee Chae-young (born Lee Bo-young, 1986), South Korean actress
- Jeon Yeo-been (born Jeon Bo-young, 1989), South Korean actress
- Park Bo-young (born 1990), South Korean actress
- Jeong Bo-young (born 2003), South Korean tennis player

== See also ==
- List of Korean given names
