= Shin-hye =

- Hangul: 신혜
- RR: Sinhye
- MR: Sinhye
- IPA: [ɕinçe]

Shin-hye, also spelled Sin-hye, or Shin-hae, Shin-hay, Shin-hea, is a Korean given name.

People with this name include:

- Queen Sinhye (fl. 918), first wife of King Taejo of Goryeo
- Hwang Shin-hye (born 1963), South Korean actress
- Bang Sin-hye (born 1967), South Korean hurdler
- Park Shin-hye (born 1990), South Korean actress
- Jeong Shin-hye (born 1994), South Korean actress

== See also ==
- List of Korean given names
