= Myung-soon =

- Hangul: 명순
- RR: Myeongsun
- MR: Myŏngsun

Myung-soon, also spelled Myong-sun, is a Korean given name.

People with this name include:

- Son Myung-soon (1929–2024), First Lady of South Korea from 1993 to 1998
- Kim Myung-soon (born 1964), South Korean team handball player
- Ri Myong-sun (born 1992), North Korean table tennis player

== See also ==
- List of Korean given names
