= Young-ha =

- Hangul: 영하
- RR: Yeongha
- MR: Yŏngha
- IPA: [jʌŋɦa]

Young-ha, also spelled Yong-ha, is a Korean given name.

People with this name include:

- Chu Yong-ha (1908–?), North Korean politician and diplomat
- Lee Young-ha (born 1951), South Korean actor
- Kim Young-ha (born 1968), South Korean writer
- Lee Young-ha (baseball) (born 1997), South Korean baseball player
- Lee Yeong-ha, South Korean speed skater, flag bearer for South Korea at the 1992 Winter Olympics

== See also ==
- List of Korean given names
