= Si-yeon =

- Hangul: 시연
- RR: Siyeon
- MR: Siyŏn
- IPA: [ɕijʌn]

Si-yeon, also spelled Shi-yeon, is a Korean given name.

== People ==
People with this name include:

- Sung Shi-yeon (born 1975), South Korean classical conductor
- Park Si-yeon (born Park Mi-seon, 1979), South Korean actress
- Lee Si-yeon (born Lee Dae-hak, 1980), South Korean transgender actress and model
- Xiyeon (born Park Jung-hyun, 2000), South Korean singer, member of girl group Pristin

== Fictional characters ==
Fictional characters with this name include:

- Bang Shi-yeon, female character in 2012 South Korean television series SOS - Save Our School
- Si-yeon, female character in 2015 South Korean film A Break Alone

== See also ==
- List of Korean given names
