= Jae-shin =

- Hangul: 재신
- RR: Jaesin
- MR: Chaesin

Jae-shin is a Korean given name.

People with this name include:

- Chai-Shin Yu (1932–2023), Korean-Canadian academic

Fictional characters with this name include:

- Jae-sin, in 2007 South Korean film Our Town
- Moon Jae-shin, in 2010 South Korean television series Sungkyunkwan Scandal
- Lee Jae-shin, in 2012 South Korean television series The King 2 Hearts
- Yoo Jae-shin, in 2016 South Korean television series Guardian: The Lonely and Great God

== See also ==
- List of Korean given names
