= Min-sun =

- Hangul: 민선
- RR: Minseon
- MR: Minsŏn

Min-sun is a Korean given name.

People with this name include:

- Cho Min-sun (born 1972), South Korean judoka
- Kim Gyu-ri (actress, born August 1979), birth name Kim Min-sun, South Korean actress

== See also ==
- List of Korean given names
