= Mi-hee =

- Hangul: 미희
- RR: Mihui
- MR: Mihŭi

Mi-hee, also spelled Mee-hee, is a Korean given name.

People with this name include:

- Chang Mi-hee (born 1957), South Korean actress
- Eun Meehee (born 1960), South Korean novelist
- Gwak Mi-hee (born 1974), South Korean cross-country mountain biker

== See also ==
- List of Korean given names
