= Young-ae =

- Hangul: 영애
- RR: Yeongae
- MR: Yŏngae

Young-ae, also spelled Yong-ae, is a Korean given name.

People with this name include:

- Kim Young-ae (1951–2017), South Korean actress
- Kim Young-ae (politician) (김영애, born 1964), South Korean politician from Ulsan
- Kim Yong Ae (born 1985), North Korean footballer who represented North Korea at the 2008 Summer Olympics
- Lee Young-ae (born 1971), South Korean actress
- Ri Yong-Ae (born 1965), North Korean long jumper

== See also ==
- List of Korean given names
