= Suk-won =

- Hangul: 석원
- RR: Seokwon
- MR: Sŏgwŏn

Suk-won, also spelled Seok-won, is a Korean given name.

People with this name include:

- Kim Suk-won (1893–1978), general in the Imperial Japanese Army and Republic of Korea Army
- Kim Seok-won (born 1960), South Korean footballer
- Lee Seok-won (born 1971), lead singer of South Korean rock group Onnine Ibalgwan
- Jung Suk-won (born 1985), South Korean actor
- Jang Suk-Won (born 1989), South Korean footballer

== See also ==
- List of Korean given names
