= Joon-tae =

- Hangul: 준태
- RR: Juntae
- MR: Chunt'ae

Joon-tae is a Korean given name.

People with this name include:

- Kim Joon-tae (footballer) (born 1985), South Korean footballer
- Park Jun-tae (born 1989), South Korean footballer
- Kim Joon-tae, South Korean taekwondo practitioner

Fictional characters with this name include:

- Oh Joon-tae, in 2002 South Korean television series Successful Story of a Bright Girl

== See also ==
- List of Korean given names
