= Dong-chan =

- Hangul: 동찬
- RR: Dongchan
- MR: Tongch'an

Dong-chan is a Korean given name.

People with this name include:

- Kim Dong-chan (born 1981), South Korean footballer
- Cho Dong-chan (born 1983), South Korean baseball player

Fictional characters with this name include:

- Ki Dong-chan, in 2014 South Korean television series God's Gift: 14 Days

== See also ==
- List of Korean given names
