= Yoo-gun =

- Hangul: 유건
- RR: Yugeon
- MR: Yugŏn

Yoo-gun is a Korean given name.

People with this name include:

- Jo Jeong-ik (born 1983), stage name Yoo Gun, American-born South Korean actor

Fictional characters with this name include:

- Jung Yoo-gun, in 2013 South Korean television series Iris II

== See also ==
- List of Korean given names
