= Hyung-min =

- Hangul: 형민
- RR: Hyeongmin
- MR: Hyŏngmin

Hyung-min, also spelled Hyeong-min, is a Korean given name.

People with this name include:

- Chung Hyung-min (born 1964), South Korean biotechnology professor
- Lee Hyung-min (born 1969), South Korean film director
- Joseph Hyungmin Son (born 1970), South Korean-born American mixed martial artist
- Han Hyeong-min (born 1971), South Korean boxer
- Shin Hyung-min (born 1986), South Korean footballer
- Choe Hyeong-min (born 1990), South Korean cyclist

== See also ==
- List of Korean given names
