= Yoon-ho =

- Hangul: 윤호
- RR: Yunho
- MR: Yunho

Yoon-ho, also spelled Yun-ho, is a Korean given name.

People with this name include:

- Ji Yoon-ho (born 1991), South Korean actor
- Lim Yoon-ho (born 1989), South Korean actor
- Nam Yoon-ho (born 1984), South Korean male curler
- Yunho (born Jung Yun-ho, 1986), South Korean singer-songwriter and actor
- Yunho (born Jeong Yun-ho, 1999), South Korean singer and actor

== See also ==
- List of Korean given names
