= Na-moo =

- Hangul: 나무
- RR: Namu
- MR: Namu
- IPA: [namu]

Na-moo, also spelled Na-mu, is a Korean given name. The word itself is a native Korean word meaning "tree", "wood" or "firewood" and does not have corresponding hanja. However, since Korean given names can be created arbitrarily, it may also be a name with hanja.

== People ==
People with this name include:

- Choi Na-moo (born 1990), South Korean actress
- Yoon Na-moo (born 1985), South Korean actor

== Fictional characters ==
Fictional characters with this name include:

- Na-moo, in the 2013 South Korean television series Empress Ki
- Na-moo, in the 2015 South Korean television series Shine or Go Crazy
- Yoon Na-moo, in the 2018 South Korean television series Come and Hug Me

== See also ==
- List of Korean given names
