= Jae-yoon =

- Hangul: 재윤
- RR: Jaeyun
- MR: Chaeyun

Jae-yoon, also spelled Jae-yun, is a Korean given name.

People with this name include:

- Jo Jae-yoon (born 1974), South Korean actor
- Jung Jae-yoon (born 1981), South Korean football player
- Lee Jae-yoon (born 1984), South Korean actor
- Savior (gamer) (born Ma Jae-yoon, 1987), South Korean former professional e-sports gamer
- Jake Sim (born Sim Jaeyun, 2002), South Korean idol, member of ENHYPEN
- Yoon (born Shim Jaeyoon, 2004), South Korean idol, member of STAYC

== See also ==
- List of Korean given names
