= Hye-mi =

- Hangul: 혜미
- RR: Hyemi
- MR: Hyemi

Hye-mi is a Korean given name.

People with this name include:

- Kang Hye-mi (born 1974), South Korean volleyball player
- Woo Hye-mi (born 1988), South Korean singer
- Na Hye-mi (born 1991), South Korean actress and model
- Kim Hye-mi (born 1983), South Korean taekwondo practitioner

Fictional characters with this name include:

- Go Hye-mi, in 2011 South Korean television series Dream High

== See also ==
- List of Korean given names
