= Sang-mi =

- Hangul: 상미
- RR: Sangmi
- MR: Sangmi

Sang-mi is a Korean given name.

People with this name include:

- Chu Sang-mi (born 1973), South Korean actress
- An Sang-mi (born 1979), retired South Korean short track speed skater
- Sam Oh (Korean name Oh Sang-mi, born 1980), South Korean television host in the Philippines
- Nam Sang-mi (born 1984), South Korean actress
- Byun Sang-mi (born 1988), South Korean rhythmic gymnast

== See also ==
- List of Korean given names
