= Eun-woo =

- Hangul: 은우
- RR: Eunu
- MR: Ŭnu

Eun-woo, also Eun-ooh, is a Korean given name.

People with this name include:

- Cha Eun-woo (born 1997), stage name of South Korean singer and actor Lee Dong-min
- Jung Eun-woo (born 1986), South Korean actor
- Park Eun-ooh (born 1990), South Korean singer
- Shim Eun-woo (born 1992), South Korean actress

== See also ==
- List of Korean given names
