= Dong-ha =

- Hangul: 동하
- RR: Dongha
- MR: Tongha

Dong-ha, also spelled Tong-ha, is a Korean given name.

People with this name include

- Lee Dong-ha (born 1942), South Korean novelist
- Jung Dong-ha (born 1980), South Korean singer, member of rock band Boohwal

Fictional characters with this name include:

- Kang Dong-ha, in 2006 South Korean television series One Fine Day
- Park Dong-ha, in 2009 South Korean film A Season of Good Rain
- Seo Dong-ha, im 2014 South Korean television series Golden Cross

== See also ==
- List of Korean given names
