= Tae-yong =

- Hangul: 태용
- RR: Taeyong
- MR: T'aeyong

Tae-yong is a Korean given name.

Notable people with this name include:

- Cho Tae-yong (born 1956), South Korean diplomat
- Kim Tae-yong (born 1969), South Korean film director
- Kim Taeyong (writer) (born 1974), South Korean writer
- Kim Tae-yong (director, born 1987), South Korean film director
- Shin Tae-yong (born 1970), South Korean footballer
- Taeyong (born Lee Tae-yong, 1995), South Korean singer, member of boy bands NCT and SuperM

== See also ==
- List of Korean given names
