= Kyu-won =

- Hangul: 규원
- RR: Gyuwon
- MR: Kyuwŏn

Kyu-won is a Korean given name.

People with this name include:

- Yi Kyu-won (1833–1901), Joseon Dynasty military official
- Oh Kyu-won (born 1941), South Korean writer
- Kim Kyu-won (born 1952), South Korean scientist
- Kyu Won Han (born 1972), South Korean-born American baritone with an active international opera career
- Lee Kyu-won (born 1989), South Korean judoka, won the world title at the age of 19 in 2009

== See also ==
- List of Korean given names
