= Dong-il =

- Hangul: 동일
- RR: Dongil
- MR: Tongil

Dong-il, also spelled Dong-ill or Tong-il, is a Korean given name.

People with this name include:

- Han Tong-il (born 1941), South Korean pianist
- Shin Dong-il (born 1968), South Korean film director
- Sung Dong-il (born 1969), South Korean actor
- Dong-ill Shin (born 1980s), South Korean-born American pianist
- Hwang Dong-il (born 1986), South Korean volleyball player

== See also ==
- List of Korean given names
