= Seung (Korean given name) =

- Hangul: 승
- RR: Seung
- MR: Sŭng
- IPA: [sɯŋ]

Seung, also spelled Sung, is a Korean given name. Notable people with the name include:

- Myŏng Sŭng, the Korean name of Ming Sheng, the last Ming Xia emperor who was exiled to Korea
- Sŏng Sŭng (died 1456), Joseon dynasty soldier
- Park Seung (born 1936), South Korean banker
- Suh Sung (born 1945), Zainichi Korean who was held as a political prisoner in South Korea for 19 years

== See also ==
- List of Korean given names
