= Seok-ju =

- Hangul: 석주
- RR: Seokju
- MR: Sŏkchu

Seok-ju, also spelled Seok-joo or Sok-ju, is a Korean given name.

People with this name include:

- Kim Seok-ju (1634–1684), Joseon Dynasty Neo-Confucian scholar
- Na Seok-ju (1892–1926), Korean independence activist who bombed the Oriental Development Company
- Kang Sok-ju (born 1939), North Korean politician and diplomat
- Ha Seok-ju (born 1968), South Korean football player

Fictional characters with this name include:

- Kim Seok-joo, from 2014 South Korean television series A New Leaf

== See also ==
- List of Korean given names
- Sin Sukchu (신숙주; 1417–1475), Joseon Dynasty official and soldier
