= Kwang-hee =

- Hangul: 광희
- RR: Gwanghui
- MR: Kwanghŭi

Kwang-hee is a Korean given name.

People with this name include:

- Lee Kwang-hee (born 1960), South Korean physicist
- Choi Kwang-hee (volleyball) (born 1974), South Korean volleyball player
- Choi Kwang-hee (born 1984), South Korean football player
- Hwang Kwang-hee (born 1988), South Korean singer, member of boyband ZE:A
- Cho Gwang-hee (born 1993), South Korean sprint canoeist
- Heo Kwang-hee (born 1995), South Korean badminton player

== See also ==
- List of Korean given names
