= Seong-han =

- Hangul: 성한
- RR: Seonghan
- MR: Sŏnghan

Seong-han, also spelled Sung-han, is a Korean given name.

People with this name include:

- Kim Sŏng-han, a politician of the Silla Dynasty
- Kim Seong-han (novelist) (1919–2010), South Korean male novelist
- Kim Seong-han (baseball) (born 1958), South Korean male baseball player
- Im Sung-han (born 1960), South Korean television screenwriter

== See also ==
- List of Korean given names
