= Seung-su =

- Hangul: 승수
- RR: Seungsu
- MR: Sŭngsu

Seung-su, Sung-su, or Seung-soo is a Korean given name.

People with this name include:

- Han Seung-soo (born 1936), South Korean politician and diplomat
- Kim Seung-soo (born 1973), South Korean actor
- Ryu Seung-soo (born 1981), South Korean actor
- Lee Seung-soo (born 1990), South Korean judoka

== See also ==
- List of Korean given names
