= Won-chul =

- Hangul: 원철
- RR: Woncheol
- MR: Wŏnch'ŏl

Won-chul, also spelled Won-chol, is a Korean given name.

People with this name include:

- Paek Won-chul (born 1977), South Korean handball player
- Yoo Won-chul (born 1984), South Korean gymnast
- Yun Won-chol (born 1989), North Korean Greco-Roman wrestler

== See also ==
- List of Korean given names
