= Sung-mo =

- Hangul: 성모
- RR: Seongmo
- MR: Sŏngmo

Sung-mo, also spelled Seong-mo, Song-mo, is a Korean given name.

People with this name include:

- Cho Sung-mo (born 1985), retired South Korean swimmer
- Jo Sung-mo (born 1977), South Korean singer
- Sung-Mo Kang, South Korean electrical engineering scientist and professor
- Shin Sung-mo (1891–1960), acting prime minister of South Korea in 1950

Fictional characters with this name include:

- Lee Sung-mo, in 2010 South Korean television series Giant

== See also ==
- List of Korean given names
