= Hyo-joo =

- Hangul: 효주
- RR: Hyoju
- MR: Hyoju

Hyo-joo, also spelled Hyo-ju, is a Korean given name.

People with this name include:

- Park Hyo-joo (born 1982), South Korean actress
- An Hyo-ju (born 1987), South Korean field hockey player
- Han Hyo-joo (born 1987), South Korean actress
- Kim Hyo-joo (born 1995), South Korean golfer

== See also ==
- List of Korean given names
