= Hyung-joo =

- Hangul: 형주
- RR: Hyeongju
- MR: Hyŏngju

Hyung-joo, also spelled Hyung-ju, is a Korean given name.

People with this name include:

- Ha Hyung-joo (born 1962), South Korean judoka
- Kim Hyung-ju (born 1976), South Korean judoka
- Kim Hyung-joo (born 1985), South Korean freestyle wrestler
- Lim Hyung-joo (born 1986), South Korean singer
- Park Hyung-joo (born 1995), South Korean swimmer

== See also ==
- List of Korean given names
