= Oh-seong =

- Hangul: 오성
- RR: Oseong
- MR: Osŏng

Oh-seong, also spelled Oh-sung, is a Korean given name.

People with this name include:

- Yu Oh-seong (born 1968), South Korean actor
- Kim Oh-sung (born 1986), South Korean footballer

== See also ==
- List of Korean given names
