= Ji-seok =

- Hangul: 지석
- RR: Jiseok
- MR: Chisŏk

Ji-seok is a Korean given name.

People with this name include:

- James Kim Ji-seok (born 1940), South Korean Roman Catholic priest, Bishop of the Diocese of Wonju
- Kim Ji-seok (actor) (born Kim Bo-seok, 1981), South Korean actor
- Seo Ji-seok (born So Jong-uk, 1981), South Korean actor
- Kim Ji-seok (Go player) (born 1989), South Korean professional Go player

Fictional characters with this name include:

- Ji-suk, from 2003 South Korean film Madeleine
- Seo Ji-suk, from 1999 South Korean television series Happy Together

== See also ==
- List of Korean given names
