= Yi-seul =

- Hangul: 이슬
- RR: Iseul
- MR: Isŭl
- IPA: [isɯl]

Yi-seul, also spelled I-seul or E-seul, is a Korean given name. The word itself is a native Korean word meaning "dew" and does not have corresponding hanja. However, since Korean given names can be created arbitrarily, it may also be a name with hanja (e.g. 迆璱).

== People ==
People with this name include:

- Baek Ee-seul (born 1994), South Korean field hockey player

== Fictional characters ==
Fictional characters with this name include:

- Choi Yi-seul, in the 2002 South Korean television series Magic Kid Masuri
- Ham Yi-seul, in the 2012 South Korean television series Operation Proposal
- Kim Yi-seul, in the 2014 South Korean film Whistle Blower
- Hong Yi-seul, in the 2015 South Korean television series Bubble Gum

== See also ==
- List of Korean given names
