= Yun-seok =

- Hangul: 윤석
- RR: Yunseok
- MR: Yunsŏk

Yun-seok, also spelled Yoon-seok or Yun-suk, is a Korean given name.

People with this name include:

- Hwang Yun-suk (1929–1961), South Korean female judge
- Kim Yoon-seok (born 1967), South Korean actor
- Lucid Fall (born Jo Yun-suk, 1975), South Korean singer-songwriter
- Jung Yoon-suk (born 1981), South Korean film director
- Oh Yun-suk (born 1984), South Korean handball player
- Jung Yun-seok (born 2003), South Korean child actor

== See also ==
- List of Korean given names
