= Se-mi (name) =

- Hangul: 세미
- RR: Semi
- MR: Semi

Se-mi (Korean: 세미) is a Korean given name. As of 2026, the name ranked 12,118th out of 36,179 male names and 669th out of 28,726 female names. A total of 454 people, consisting of 2 males and 452 females, were born with the name from 2008 to 2026.

Notable people with the name include:

- Im Se-mi, South Korean actress
- Lee Se-mi, South Korean actress

Fictional characters include:

- Se-mi, also known as Player 380, portrayed by Won Ji-an, a supporting character from Squid Game season 2 and season 3
- Yoo Se-mi, portrayed by Yoo In-na, a female supporting character and antagonist from My Love from the Star

== See also ==
- List of Korean given names
