= Do-hun =

- Hangul: 도훈
- RR: Dohun
- MR: Tohun

Do-hun, also spelled Do-hoon, is a Korean given name.

People with this name include:

- Kim Do-hoon (born 1970), South Korean football manager
- Im Do-hun (born 1972), South Korean volleyball player
- Park Do-hun (born 1964), South Korean former handball player
- Kim Dohoon (born 2005), South Korean singer, member of TWS

Fictional characters with this name include:

- Ahn Do-hoon, in 2013 South Korean television series Secret Love
- Baek Do-hoon, in 2013 South Korean television series King of Ambition

== See also ==
- List of Korean given names
