= Ki-tae =

- Hangul: 기태
- RR: Gitae
- MR: Kit'ae

Ki-tae, also spelled Ki-tai, is a Korean given name.

People with this name include:

- Kim Ki-tae (rower) (born 1952), North Korean rower
- Bae Ki-tae (born 1965), South Korean speed skater
- Huh Ki-tae (born 1967), South Korean footballer
- Kim Ki-tai (born 1969), South Korean baseball player

== See also ==
- List of Korean given names
