= Dong-seok =

- Hangul: 동석
- RR: Dongseok
- MR: Tongsŏk

Dong-seok, also spelled Dong-suk or Tong-sok, is a Korean given name.

People with this name include:

- Dong-Suk Kang (born 1954), South Korean violinist
- Kang Dong-suk (adventurer) (born 1969), South Korean yachtsman
- Ma Dong-seok (born 1971), South Korean actor
- Park Dong-suk (born 1984), South Korean football player
- Kim Dong-suk (born 1987), South Korean football player

Fictional characters with this name include:

- Kang Dong-seok, in 1995 South Korean television series Asphalt Man

== See also ==
- List of Korean given names
