= Hye-rin =

- Hangul: 혜린
- RR: Hyerin
- MR: Hyerin

Hye-rin, also spelled Hye-lin, is a Korean given name.

People with this name include:

- Kim Hye-rin (artist) (born 1962), South Korean manhwa artist
- Han Hye-rin (born 1988), South Korean actress
- Raina (singer) (born Oh Hye-rin, 1989), South Korean singer, member of girl group After School
- Seo Hye-lin (born 1993), South Korean singer, member of girl group EXID
- Kim Hae-lin (born 1995), South Korean figure skater
- Jeong Hye-rin (born 2007), South Korean singer, and main dancer of girl group TripleS

== See also ==
- List of Korean given names
