= Jae-geun =

- Hangul: 재근
- RR: Jaegeun
- MR: Chaegŭn

Jae-geun, also spelled Jae-keun or Jae-kun, is a Korean given name.

People with this name include:

- Im Jae-geun (born 1950), South Korean boxer
- In Jae-keun (born 1953), South Korean politician and democracy activist
- Jang Jae-keun (born 1962), South Korean sprinter
- Jung Jae-kun (born 1969), South Korean basketball player
- Song Jae-kun (born 1974), South Korean short track speed skater

== See also ==
- List of Korean given names
