= Hee-joon =

- Hangul: 희준
- RR: Huijun
- MR: Hŭijun

Hee-joon, also spelled Hee-jun, is a Korean given name.

People with this name include:

- Lee Hee-joon (born 1979), South Korean actor
- Moon Hee-joon (born 1978), South Korean singer
- Han Hee-jun (born 1989), South Korean singer

== See also ==
- List of Korean given names
