= Seung-heon =

- Hangul: 승헌
- RR: Seungheon
- MR: Sŭnghŏn

Seung-heon, also spelled Seung-hun, is a Korean given name.

People with this name include:

- Lee Seung-heon (born 1950), pen name Lee Ilchi, South Korean self-help writer
- Song Seung-heon (born 1976), South Korean actor

== See also ==
- List of Korean given names
