= Kyung-lim =

- Hangul: 경림
- RR: Gyeongrim
- MR: Kyŏngnim

Kyung-lim, also spelled Kyung-rim or Kyung-nim, is a Korean given name.

People with this name include:

- Prince Gyeongnim (1534–1602), Joseon Dynasty official and nobleman
- Shin Kyeong-nim (1936–2024), South Korean writer
- Shin Gyeong-rim (politician) (신경림, born 1954), South Korean politician with the Saenuri Party
- Park Kyung-lim (born 1979), South Korean entertainer and comedian

== See also ==
- List of Korean given names
