= Nam-il =

- Hangul: 남일
- RR: Namil
- MR: Namil

Nam-il is a Korean given name.

People with this name include:

- Kim Nam-il (born 1977), South Korean football player
- Paek Nam-il, North Korean politician

== See also ==
- List of Korean given names
- Nam Il (1913-1976), North Korean politician, foreign minister 1953-1967
