= Yeon-hee =

- Hangul: 연희
- RR: Yeonhui
- MR: Yŏnhŭi

Yeon-hee, also spelled Yun-hee or Yon-hui, is a Korean given name.

People with this name include:

- Maria Yi Yonhui, one of the Joseon Dynasty Roman Catholic Korean Martyrs
- Cha Yun-hee (born 1986), South Korean football player
- Lee Yeon-hee (born 1988), South Korean actress
- Jong Yon-hui (born 1989), North Korean synchronised swimmer

== See also ==
- List of Korean given names
