= Jong-il =

- Hangul: 종일
- RR: Jongil
- MR: Chongil

Jong-il, also spelled Jong-yil, is a Korean given name.

Notable people with the given name include:

- Ra Jong-yil (born 1940), South Korean diplomat
- Kim Jong-il (long jumper) (born 1962), South Korean long jumper
- Park Jong-il (born 1972), South Korean ski mountaineer
- Choi Jong-il, South Korean businessman

== See also ==
- List of Korean given names
