= Da-hye =

- Hangul: 다혜
- RR: Dahye
- MR: Tahye
- IPA: [tahe]

Da-hye, also spelled Da-hae, or Da-hay is a Korean given name.

== People ==
People with this name include:

- Jeon Da-hye (born 1983), South Korean short track speed skater
- Jeong Da-hye (born 1985), South Korean actress
- Lee Da-hye (Go player) (born 1985), South Korean Go player
- Lee Da-hye (swimmer) (born 1987), South Korean swimmer
- Heize (born Jang Da-hye, 1991), South Korean singer

== See also ==
- List of Korean given names
