= Kyung-taek =

- Hangul: 경택
- RR: Gyeongtaek
- MR: Kyŏngt'aek

Kyung-taek, also spelled Kyong-taek, is a Korean given name.

People with this name include:

- Kim Kyong-taek, South Korean academic, president of Dongkang College
- Kwak Kyung-taek (born 1966), South Korean film director
- Song Kyung-Taek (born 1983), South Korean short track speed skater

Fictional characters with this name include:

- Koo Kyung-taek, in 2006 South Korean television series One Fine Day

== See also ==
- List of Korean given names
