= Si-hyun =

- Hangul: 시현
- RR: Sihyeon
- MR: Sihyŏn
- IPA: [ɕiçʌn]

Si-hyun, also spelled Si-hyeon, or Shi-hyun, is a Korean given name.

People with this name include:

- Son Si-hyun (born 1980), South Korean shortstop for the NC Dinos in the KBO League
- Ahn Shi-hyun (born 1984), South Korean professional golfer
- Kim Si-hyeon (born 1999), South Korean singer, member of girl group Everglow

== See also ==
- List of Korean given names
