= Jeong-hyo =

- Hangul: 정효
- RR: Jeonghyo
- MR: Chŏnghyo

Jeong-hyo, also spelled Jung-hyo, is a Korean given name.

== People ==
People with this name include:

- Princess Jeonghyo of Balhae (d. 792), who is buried at the Mausoleum of Princess Jeonghyo
- Sinjong of Goryeo (1144–1204), posthumous name Jeonghyo, twentieth monarch of the Goryeo Dynasty
- Ahn Junghyo (born 1941), South Korean male novelist
- Lee Jung-hyo (born 1975), South Korean male football player

== See also ==
- List of Korean given names
