= Nam-gi =

- Hangul: 남기
- RR: Namgi
- MR: Namgi

Nam-gi, also spelled Nam-ki, is a Korean given name.

People with this name include:

- Zhao Nanqi (born 1927; in Korean Cho Nam-gi), Chinese People's Liberation Army general of Korean descent
- Pak Nam-gi (1934–2010), North Korean official, Director of the Workers' Party of Korea's Planning and Finance Department
- Namgi Park, South Korean professor of education

== See also ==
- List of Korean given names
