= Sook (Korean name) =

- Hangul: 숙
- RR: Suk
- MR: Suk

Sook, also spelled Suk, is a is a Korean given name. Notable people with the name include:

- Kim Sook (diplomat) (born 1952), South Korean male diplomat
- Mun Suk (born 1966), South Korean female cyclist
- Kim Sook (comedian) (born 1975), South Korean female comedian

== See also ==
- List of Korean given names
