= Jae-in =

- Hangul: 재인
- RR: Jaein
- MR: Chaein

Jae-in is a Korean given name. According to statistics of the Supreme Court, among 852,614 South Koreans who changed their names between October 2012 and October 2017, Jae-in was the 336th-most popular new name, chosen by 531 people over that period. It did not experience any boost in popularity following the election of Moon Jae-in as president of South Korea, though it was still the most popular new name among the given names of the past five presidents.

People with this name include:

- Moon Jae-in (born 1953), South Korean politician
- Tak Jae-in (fl. 1974–present), South Korean voice actor
- Jang Jae-in (born 1992), South Korean singer-songwriter
- Lee Jae-in (born 2004), South Korean actress

== See also ==
- List of Korean given names
