= Seung-ah =

- Hangul: 승아
- RR: Seunga
- MR: Sŭnga

Seung-ah, also spelled Seung-a, is a Korean given name.

People with this name include:

- Seo Seung-ah (born Lee Na-young, 1983), South Korean actress
- Yoon Seung-ah (born 1983), South Korean actress
- Oh Seung-ah (born Oh Se-mi, 1988), South Korean singer and actress, former member of girl group Rainbow

Fictional characters with this name include:

- Oh Seung-ah, in 2009 South Korean television series On Air

== See also ==
- List of Korean given names
