= Hyun-wook =

- Hangul: 현욱
- RR: Hyeonuk
- MR: Hyŏnuk

Hyun-wook, also spelled Hyeon-uk or Hyon-uk, is a Korean given name.

People with this name include:

- Park Hyun-wook (born 1967), South Korean writer
- Cho Hyun-wook (born 1970), South Korean high jumper
- Jong Hyun-wook (born 1978), South Korean baseball player
- Lee Hyun-wook (born 1985), South Korean actor
- So Hyon-uk (born 1992), North Korean football player

== See also ==
- List of Korean given names
