= Tae-joon =

- Hangul: 태준
- RR: Taejun
- MR: T'aejun

Tae-joon is a Korean given name.

People with this name include:

- Choi Tae-joon (born 1991), South Korean actor
- Park Tae-joon (1927–2011), South Korean general and businessman
- Ryu Tae-joon (born 1971), South Korean actor and singer

== See also ==
- List of Korean given names
