= Byung-joon =

- Hangul: 병준
- RR: Byeongjun
- MR: Pyŏngjun

Byung-joon, also spelled Byong-joon, Byoung-jun, or Byung-jun, is a Korean given name.

People with this name include:

- Song Byeong-jun (1857–1925), Joseon Dynasty politician and soldier
- Kim Byong-joon (born 1954), South Korean politician
- No Byung-jun (born 1979), South Korean football player
- Kim Byeong-jun (speed skater) (born 1988), South Korean speed skater
- Kim Byoung-jun (born 1991), South Korean track and field athlete

== See also ==
- List of Korean given names
