= Tae-hee =

- Hangul: 태희
- RR: Taehui
- MR: T'aehŭi

Tae-hee, also spelled Tae-hi, is a Korean given name.

People with this name include:

- Kim Tae-hee (born 1980), South Korean actress
- Lee Tae-hee (born 1992), South Korean football defender (K-League Classic)
- Lee Tae-hee (footballer, born 1995), South Korean football goalkeeper (K-League Classic)
- Nam Tae-hee (born 1991), South Korean international footballer
- Nam Tae-Hi (1929–2013), South Korean taekwondo master
- Yim Tae-hee (born 1956), South Korean politician, former chief of staff to Lee Myung-bak

== See also ==
- List of Korean given names
