= Dong-woo =

- Hangul: 동우
- RR: Dongu
- MR: Tongu

Dong-woo or Dong-u is a Korean given name.

People with this name include:

- Jang Dong-woo (born 1990), South Korean singer, member of boy band Infinite
- Kim Dong-woo (born 1988), South Korean football player
- Kim Dong-woo (skier) (born 1995), South Korean alpine skier
- Seok Dong-woo (born 1990), South Korean football player
- Shin Dong-woo (actor) (born 1998), South Korean actor
- CNU (singer) (born Shin Dong-woo, 1991), South Korean singer, member of boy band B1A4

== See also ==
- List of Korean given names
