= Myung-jun =

- Hangul: 명준
- RR: Myeongjun
- MR: Myŏngjun
- IPA: [mjʌŋ.dʑun]

Myung-jun, also spelled Myeong-jun or Myŏng-jun, is a Korean given name.

People with this name include:

- Cho Myung-jun (born 1970), South Korean field hockey coach
- Yoon Myung-june (born 1989), South Korean baseball pitcher
- Seo Myung-joon (born 1992), South Korean freestyle skier
- MJ (born Kim Myung-jun, 1994), South Korean singer, member of Astro
- Son Myeong-jun (born 1994), South Korean long-distance runner
- Kim Myeong-joon, South Korean film director

== See also ==
- List of Korean given names
