= Hae-seong =

- Hangul: 해성
- RR: Haeseong
- MR: Haesŏng

Hae-seong, also spelled Hae-sung, is a Korean given name.

People with this name include:

- Jung Hae-seong (born 1958), South Korean football manager
- Song Hae-sung (born 1964), South Korean film director and screenwriter
- Kook Hae-seong (born 1989), South Korean baseball outfielder
- Kwak Hae-seong (born 1991), South Korean football player

== See also ==
- List of Korean given names
