= Si-young =

- Hangul: 시영
- RR: Siyeong
- MR: Siyŏng
- IPA: [ɕijʌŋ]

Si-young, also spelled Shi-young, or Si-yeong, is a Korean given name.

People with this name include:

- Yi Si-yeong (1868-1953), Korean male politician, independence activist, educator and neo-Confucianist scholar
- Lee Si-young (born 1950), South Korean male writer
- Lee Si-young (born Lee Eun-rae, 1982), South Korean actress and former amateur boxer
- Lee Si-young (born 1997), South Korean male footballer

== See also ==
- List of Korean given names
