= Yong-gi =

- Hangul: 용기
- RR: Yonggi
- MR: Yonggi

Yong-gi, also spelled Yong-ki, is a Korean given name.

People with this name include:

- David Yonggi Cho (born 1936), South Korean Christian minister
- Oh Young-ki (born 1965), South Korean former handball player
- Kim Yong-Gi (footballer) (born 1989), South Korean footballer
- Kim Yong-ki (1908–1988), South Korean agrarian activist
- Lee Yong-Gi (born 1985), South Korean footballer
- Ryang Yong-Gi (born 1982), Zainichi Korean footballer

== See also ==
- List of Korean given names
