= Myung-hwan =

- Hangul: 명환
- RR: Myeonghwan
- MR: Myŏnghwan

Myung-hwan is a Korean given name.

People with this name include:

- Yu Myung-hwan (born 1946), South Korean diplomat
- Kim Myung-hwan (born 1987), South Korean football defender

== See also ==
- List of Korean given names
