= Jung-myung =

- Hangul: 정명
- RR: Jeongmyeong
- MR: Chŏngmyŏng

Jung-myung is a Korean given name.

People with this name include:

- Chun Jung-myung (born 1980), South Korean actor
- Cho Jung-myung (born 1993), South Korean luger
- Lee Jung-myung, South Korean novelist

Fictional characters with this name include:

- Joo Jung-myung, in 2012 South Korean television series Missing You

== See also ==
- List of Korean given names
