= Chan-young =

- Hangul: 찬영
- RR: Chanyeong
- MR: Ch'anyŏng

Chan-young, Chan-yeong, or Chan-yong is a Korean given name.

People with this name include:

- Kim Chan-young (born 1989), South Korean footballer
- Park Chan-young (handballer) (born 1983), South Korean handball player
- Yoon Chan-young (born 2001), South Korean actor
- Kim Chan-young (born 2000), South Korean rapper and member of D-Crunch
- Park Chan-yong (born 1963), South Korean boxer
- Lee Chan-young (born 2004), also known as Anton Lee, Korean-American singer and a member of the South Korean boy group Riize.

== See also ==
- List of Korean given names
