= Jae-suk =

- Hangul: 재석
- RR: Jaeseok
- MR: Chaesŏk

Jae-suk is a Korean given name.

People with this name include:

- Han Jae-suk (born 1973), South Korean actor
- Lee Jae-Suk (born 1963), South Korean former wrestler
- Oh Jae-Suk (born 1990), South Korean football player
- Yoo Jae-suk (born 1972), South Korean comedian and host

== See also ==
- List of Korean given names
