= Ji-hwan =

- Hangul: 지환
- RR: Jihwan
- MR: Chihwan

Ji-hwan, also spelled Chi-hwan, is a Korean given name.

People with this name include:

- Ahn Ji-hwan (born 1969), South Korean voice actor, actor, and television and radio presenter
- Han Ji-hwan (born 1977), South Korean former judoka
- Kang Ji-hwan (born 1977), South Korean actor
- Han Chi-hwan (born 1984), South Korean civil rights activist
- Oh Ji-hwan (born 1990), South Korean baseball player
- Bae Ji-hwan (born 1999), South Korean baseball player

== See also ==
- List of Korean given names
