= Young-hwan =

- Hangul: 영환
- RR: Yeonghwan
- MR: Yŏnghwan

Young-hwan is a Korean given name. It was the ninth-most popular name for newborn boys in South Korea in 1950.

People with this name include:

- Min Young-hwan (1861–1905), Korean Empire government official and reformist
- Chung Yeong-hwan (born 1938), South Korean football player
- Park Young-hwan (born 1942), South Korean football player
- Cha Young-hwan (born 1990), South Korean football player

== See also ==
- List of Korean given names
