= Ji-ha =

- Hangul: 지하
- RR: Jiha
- MR: Chiha

Ji-ha, also spelled Jee-ha or Chi-ha, is a Korean given name.

People with this name include:

- Kim Chi-ha (born 1941), South Korean poet
- Lee Ji-ha (born 1970), South Korean actress
- Jiha Moon (born 1973), South Korean-born American artist
- Jiha Lee, keyboardist

Fictional characters with this name include:

- Shin Jee-ha, in 2005 South Korean manhwa series Veritas

== See also ==
- List of Korean given names
