= Min (Korean given name) =

- Hangul: 민
- RR: Min
- MR: Min

Min is a Korean given name. Notable people with the name include:

- Geum Min (born 1962), South Korean politician
- Namkoong Min (born 1978), South Korean film and television actor
- Kang Min (born 1982), South Korean professional StarCraft player
- Sung Min (swimmer) (born 1982), South Korean swimmer
- Park Min (born 1986), South Korean football player

== See also ==
- List of Korean given names
