= Hong-joo =

- Hangul: 홍주
- RR: Hongju
- MR: Hongju

Hong-joo is a Korean given name.

People with same name

- Harold Hongju Koh (born 1954), Korean American lawyer and legal scholar

Fictional characters with this name include

- Chae Hong-joo (aka Ueno Rie), in 2012 South Korean television series Bridal Mask
- Nam Hong-joo, in 2017 South Korean television series While You Were Sleeping
- Choi Hong-joo, in 2021 South Korean television series Mouse

== See also ==
- List of Korean given names
