= Kyung-chul =

- Hangul: 경철
- RR: Gyeongcheol
- MR: Kyŏngch'ŏl

Kyung-chul, also spelled Kyong-chol or Gyeong-cheol, is a Korean given name.

People with this name include:

- Cho Gyeong-chul (1929–2010), South Korean astronomer
- Park Gyeong-cheol (born 1969), South Korean sprint canoer
- Ri Kyong-chol (born 1979), North Korean long-distance runner
- Lee Kyung-chul, South Korean archer
- Cho Kyong-chol, North Korean Supreme People's Assembly member for Sungrisan; see 2014 North Korean parliamentary election

Fictional characters with this name include:

- Jang Kyung-chul, in 2010 South Korean film I Saw the Devil

== See also ==
- List of Korean given names
