= Jin-sun =

- Hangul: 진선
- RR: Jinseon
- MR: Chinsŏn

Jin-sun, also spelled Jin-seon, is a Korean given name.

People with this name include:

- Kim Jin-sun (born 1946), South Korean politician
- Yoo Jin-sun (born 1962), South Korean tennis player
- Jung Jin-sun (born 1984), South Korean fencer

== See also ==
- List of Korean given names
- Kim Jin-sun (fencer) (born 1968), South Korean female fencer, whose given name has a different vowel (진순)
