= Ho-jung =

- Hangul: 호정
- RR: Hojeong
- MR: Hojŏng

Ho-jung, also spelled Ho-jeong, is a Korean given name.

People with this name include:

- Kim Ho-jung (born 1968), South Korean actress
- Yoo Ho-jeong (born 1969), South Korean actress
- Lee Ho-jung (figure skater) (born 1997), South Korean retired figure skater
- Jeong Ho-jeong (born 1988), South Korean football player
- Choi Ho-jung (born 1989), South Korean football player

== See also ==
- List of Korean given names
