= Chang-woo =

- Hangul: 창우
- RR: Changu
- MR: Ch'angu

Chang-woo is a Korean given name.

People with this name include:

- Han Chang-u (born 1931), Korean-born Japanese businessman
- Lee Chang-Woo (born 1983), South Korean handball player
- Rim Chang-Woo (born 1992), South Korean footballer

== See also ==
- List of Korean given names
