= Sung-keun =

- Hangul: 성근
- RR: Seonggeun
- MR: Sŏnggŭn

Sung-keun or Seong-geun, also spelled Song-gun, is a Korean given name.

People with this name include

- Kim Sung-keun (born 1942), South Korean baseball player
- Kim Song-gun (born 1945), North Korean painter
- Moon Sung-keun (born 1953), South Korean actor and politician
- Choi Sung-keun (born 1991), South Korean footballer

== See also ==
- List of Korean given names
