= Young-shin =

- Hangul: 영신
- RR: Yeongsin
- MR: Yŏngsin
- IPA: [jʌŋ.ɕʰin]

Young-shin is a Korean given name.

People with this name include:

- Cho Young-shin (born 1967), South Korean male handball coach
- Kim Young-sin (born 1986), South Korean football player
- Nam Yeong-sin (born 1990), South Korean female handball player

Fictional characters with this name include:

- Lee Young-shin, in 2007 South Korean television series Thank You
- Young-sin, female character in 2018 South Korean television series Mother

== See also ==
- List of Korean given names
