= Yeon (Korean given name) =

- Hangul: 연
- RR: Yeon
- MR: Yŏn
- IPA: [jʌn]

Yeon, also spelled Yon, or Yun is a is a Korean given name. Notable people with the name include:

- Pak Yŏn (1378–1458), Korean scholar-official

== See also ==
- List of Korean given names
