= Won-yong =

- Hangul: 원용
- RR: Wonyong
- MR: Wŏnyong
- IPA: [wʌɲoŋ]

Won-yong is a Korean given name.

People with this name include:

- Kang Won-yong (1917–2006), South Korean Presbyterian leader
- Kim Won-yong (1922–1993), South Korean archaeologist
- Wonyong Sung (born 1950s), South Korean professor of electronic engineering
- Jung Won-yong (born 1992), South Korean swimmer
- Jang Won-young (born 2004), South Korean female singer, member of Ive, and former member of Iz*One

== See also ==
- List of Korean given names
