= Chun-hee =

- Hangul: 춘희
- RR: Chunhui
- MR: Ch'unhŭi

Chun-hee, also spelled Chun-hui, is a Korean given name.

People with this name include:

- Ri Chun-hee (born 1943), North Korean news anchor
- Kim Chun-hui (born 1963), South Korean discus thrower
- Jong Chun-hui (born 1998), North Korean weightlifter
- Lee Choon-hee (born 1955), South Korean politician

== See also ==
- Lee Chun-hee (이천희; born 1979), South Korean actor
- List of Korean given names
