= Myung-soo =

- Hangul: 명수
- RR: Myeongsu
- MR: Myŏngsu
- IPA: [mjʌŋsu]

Myung-soo is a Korean given name.

People with this name include:

- Ri Myong-su (born 1934), North Korean military officer and politician
- Park Myung-soo (born 1970), South Korean entertainer
- L (entertainer) (born Kim Myung-soo, 1992), South Korean singer

Fictional characters with this name include:

- Dong Myung-soo, in 2013 South Korean film The Berlin File
- Kim Myung-soo, in 2021 South Korean television series Youth of May

== See also ==
- List of Korean given names
