= Han-jae =

- Hangul: 한재
- RR: Hanjae
- MR: Hanjae
- IPA: [hand͡ʑɛ]

Han-jae is a Korean given name.

People with this name include:

- Ji Han-jae (born 1936), South Korean hapkido practitioner
- Ri Han-jae (born 1982), North Korean football player

== See also ==
- List of Korean given names
