= Seung-eun =

- Hangul: 승은
- RR: Seungeun
- MR: Sŭngŭn
- IPA: [sɯŋɯn]

Seung-eun, also spelled Seung-un, or Sung-un, is a Korean given name.

People with this name include:

- Seung Eun Kim (born 1976), American male animator
- Euna Seung-eun Lee (born 1972), South Korean-born American female journalist
- Oh Seung-eun (오승은, born 1979), South Korean actress

== See also ==
- List of Korean given names
