= Nam-sun =

- Hangul: 남순
- RR: Namsun
- MR: Namsun

Nam-sun, also spelled Nam-soon, is a Korean given name.

People with this name include:

- Paek Nam-sun (1929–2007), North Korean male politician
- Lee Nam-sun (born 1961), South Korean female speed skater
- Kim Nam-soon (archer) (born 1980), South Korean female archer

Fictional characters with this name include:

- Nam-soon, male character in 2011 South Korean film Pained
- Go Nam-soon, male character in 2013 South Korean television series School 2013

== See also ==
- List of Korean given names
