= Beom-seok =

- Hangul: 범석
- RR: Beomseok
- MR: Pŏmsŏk

Beom-seok is a Korean given name. The name may be spelled various ways in the Roman alphabet. One customary spelling, Bum-suk, became a source of mirth to Anglophones in the 1950s and again in the 1980s, when two South Korean politicians who spelled their name that way rose to prominence. As a result, other transcriptions such as Pom-sok came into wider use.

People with this name include:

- Lee Beom-seok (prime minister) (1900–1972), Korean independence activist and politician
- Lee Bum Suk (foreign minister) (1925–1983), South Korean politician
- Oh Beom-seok (born 1984), South Korean football player
- Cho Beom-seok (born 1990), South Korean football player

Fictional characters with this name include:

- Oh Beom-seok, male character in the 2022 South Korean Web Drama Weak Hero Class 1

== See also ==
- List of Korean given names
