= Hyun-ho =

- Hangul: 현호
- RR: Hyeonho
- MR: Hyŏnho

Hyun-ho or Hyeon-ho is a Korean given name.

People with this name include:

- Lee Hyun-ho (born 1988), South Korean football player
- Lee Hyun-ho (baseball) (born 1992), South Korean baseball player
- Shin Hyun-ho (born 1953), South Korean football player
- Cha Ye-ryun (born Park Hyun-ho, 1985), South Korean actress

== See also ==
- List of Korean given names
