= Hee-chul (given name) =

- Hangul: 희철
- RR: Huicheol
- MR: Hŭich'ŏl

Hee-chul or Hui-cheol is a Korean given name.

People with this name include:

- Chun Hee-chul (born 1973), South Korean basketball player
- Kim Hee-chul (born 1983), South Korean singer, member of boy band Super Junior
- Hichori Morimoto (born Lee Hui-cheol, 1981), Japanese baseball player
- Park Hee-chul (born 1986), South Korean football player

== See also ==
- List of Korean given names
