= Tae-woong =

- Hangul: 태웅
- RR: Taeung
- MR: T'aeung

Tae-woong is a Korean given name.

People with this name include:

- Baik Tae-ung (born 1962), South Korean law professor and former prisoner of conscience
- Uhm Tae-woong (born 1974), South Korean actor
- Choi Tae-woong (born 1976), South Korean volleyball player
- Park Tae-woong (born 1988), South Korean footballer

== See also ==
- List of Korean given names
