= Jae-seop =

- Hangul: 재섭
- RR: Jaeseop
- MR: Chaesŏp
- IPA: [t͡ɕɛ.sʌp̚]

Jae-seop, also spelled Jae-sup or Jae-sub, is a Korean given name.

== People ==
- Kang Jae-sup (born 1948), South Korean politician
- Byun Jae-sub (born 1975), South Korean football player

== Fictional characters ==
- Kang Jae-sup, in 2004 South Korean television series April Kiss
- Jae-seop, in 2009 South Korean television series The Slingshot

== See also ==
- List of Korean given names
