= Tae-wook =

- Hangul: 태욱
- RR: Taeuk
- MR: T'aeuk

Tae-wook, also spelled Tae-uk, is a Korean given name.

People with this name include:

- Kim Jung-tae (born Kim Tae-wook, 1972) South Korean actor
- Bae Soo-bin (born Yoon Tae-wook, 1976), South Korean actor
- Choi Tae-uk (born 1981), South Korean football player
- Kim Tae-wook (born 1987), South Korean football player

Fictional characters with this name include:

- Kang Tae-wook, in 2013 South Korean television series Goddess of Marriage

== See also ==
- List of Korean given names
