= Mu-yeol =

- Hangul: 무열
- RR: Muyeol
- MR: Muyŏl
- IPA: [mujʌɭ]

Mu-yeol is a Korean given name.

People with this name include:

- Kim Mu-yeol (born 1982), South Korean actor
- Ko Moo-yeol (born 1990), South Korean footballer

Fictional characters with this name include:

- Park Mu-yeol, in 2012 South Korean television series Wild Romance

== See also ==
- List of Korean given names
