= Hae-il =

- Hangul: 해일
- RR: Haeil
- MR: Haeil

Hae-il is a Korean given name.

People with this given name include:

- Cho Hae-il (1941–2020), South Korean writer
- Nam Hae-il (born 1948), South Korean naval officer
- Park Hae-il (born 1977), South Korean actor

== See also ==
- List of Korean given names
- Haeil, a similarly-named North Korean unmanned underwater vehicle
