= Se-hun =

- Hangul: 세훈
- RR: Sehun
- MR: Sehun

Se-hun, also spelled Se-hoon or Sei-hoon, is a Korean given name.

People with this name include:

- Won Sei-hoon (born 1951), South Korean politician, former director of the National Intelligence Service
- Oh Se-hoon (born 1961), South Korean politician, former mayor of Seoul
- Min Se-hun (born 1963), South Korean discus thrower
- David Oh (musician) (Korean name Oh Se-hun, born 1991), American singer in South Korea
- Oh Se-hun (born 1994), South Korean singer, member of the South Korean group Exo

== See also ==
- List of Korean given names
