= Man-seok =

- Hangul: 만석
- RR: Manseok
- MR: Mansŏk
- IPA: [mɐn.sʌk̚]

Man-seok is a Korean given name.

People with this name include:

- Oh Man-seok (born 1975), South Korean actor

Fictional characters with this name include:

- Man-seok, in 1993 South Korean film I Will Survive
- Man-seok, in 2010 South Korean film The Man from Nowhere
- Kim Man-seok, in 2011 South Korean film Late Blossom
- Go Man-seok, in 2013 South Korean television series Two Weeks
- Choi Man-seok, in 2014 South Korean television series High School King of Savvy

== See also ==
- List of Korean given names
