= Jun-seok =

- Hangul: 준석
- RR: Junseok
- MR: Chunsŏk

Jun-seok, also spelled Joon-seok or Joon-suk, is a Korean given name.

People with this name include:

- Choi Joon-suk (born 1983), South Korean baseball player
- Song Joon-seok (born 1968), South Korean voice actor
- Bang Jun-seok (born 1970), South Korean film score composer
- Lee Jun-seok (born 1985), South Korean entrepreneur and Bareun Party politician
- Yeon Joon-seok (born 1995), South Korean actor
- Hwang Jun-seok, South Korean professor of engineering at Seoul National University

== See also ==
- List of Korean given names
