= Yun-hyeong =

- Hangul: 윤형
- RR: Yunhyeong
- MR: Yunhyŏng

Yun-hyeong, also spelled Yoon-hyung, is a Korean given name.

People with this name include:

- Lee Yoon-hyung (1979–2005), South Korean Samsung heiress
- Oh Youn-hyung (born 1984), South Korean male rugby player
- Song Yun-hyeong (born 1995), South Korean male singer

== See also ==
- List of Korean given names
