= Nam-seon =

- Hangul: 남선
- RR: Namseon
- MR: Namsŏn

Nam-seon, also spelled Nam-sun, is a Korean given name.

People with this name include:

- Choe Nam-seon (1890–1957), Korean male historian and independence activist
- Ryu Soo-young (born 1979 as Eo Nam-seon), South Korean male actor
- Kim Nam-sun (born 1981), South Korean female handball player who competed at the 2008 Summer Olympics

== See also ==
- List of Korean given names
