= Kang-hyun =

- Hangul: 강현
- RR: Ganghyeon
- MR: Kanghyŏn

Kang-hyun (Korean: 강현) is a Korean given name. As of 2026, the name ranked 223rd out of 36,179 male names and 2,715th out of 28,726 female names. A total of 2,713 people, consisting of 2,691 males and 22 females, were born with the name from 2008 to 2026.

Notable people with the name include:

- Kang-hyun Park, South Korean musical theater actor, singer, crossover artist and TV actor
- Yu Kang-hyun, South Korean footballer
- Kim Kang-hyun, South Korean former footballer

Fictional characters:

- Lee Gang-hyun, female protagonist of Flex X Cop, portrayed by Park Ji-hyun

== See also ==
- List of Korean given names
