= Hae-jin =

- Hangul: 해진
- RR: Haejin
- MR: Haejin
- IPA: [hɛdʑin]

Hae-jin is a Korean given name.

People with this name include:

- Yoo Hae-jin (born 1969), South Korean actor
- Cecilia Hae-Jin Lee (born 1970), Korean-American writer and artist
- Cho Hae-jin (born 1976), South Korean writer
- Park Hae-jin (born 1983), South Korean actor
- Kim Hae-jin (born 1997), South Korean figure skater

== See also ==
- List of Korean given names
