= Jong-seok =

- Hangul: 종석
- RR: Jongseok
- MR: Chongsŏk

Jong-seok, also spelled Jong-suk, is a Korean given name.

People with this name include:

- Lee Jong-seok (politician) (born 1958), South Korean politician
- Lee Jong-suk (born 1989), South Korean actor

== See also ==
- List of Korean given names
