= So-yi =

- Hangul: 소이
- RR: Soi
- MR: Soi

So-yi, also spelled So-yee, is a Korean given name.

People with this name include:

- Yoon So-yi (born 1985), South Korean actress
- Soyee (born Jang So-jin, 1996), South Korean singer, member of Gugudan
- Soy Kim (born Kim So-yeon), South Korean actress

Fictional characters with this name include:

- So-yi, in 2011 South Korean television series Deep Rooted Tree

== See also ==
- List of Korean given names
