= Ha-sun =

- Hangul: 하선
- RR: Haseon
- MR: Hasŏn

Ha-sun is a Korean given name.

People with this name include:

- Park Ha-sun (born 1987), South Korean actress

Fictional characters with this name include:

- Ha-sun, in the 2012 South Korean film, Masquerade

== See also ==
- List of Korean given names
