= Sung-kyung =

- Hangul: 성경
- RR: Seonggyeong
- MR: Sŏnggyŏng

Sung-kyung, also spelled Seong-gyeong, is a Korean given name.

== People ==
People with this name include:

- Kim Sung-kyung (born 1972), South Korean female television personality
- Hari (singer) (born Jeong Sung-kyung, 1990), South Korean singer
- Lee Sung-kyung (born 1990), South Korean actress

Fictional characters with this name include:

- Hwang Seong-gyeong, male character in the Soul series of fighting games

== See also ==
- List of Korean given names
- Seonggyeong (誠敬) is one of the epithets in the full posthumous name of Sunjong of Korea: His Imperial Majesty Emperor Sunjong Munon Muryeong Donin Seonggyeong of Korea
