= Kwang-jo =

- Hangul: 광조
- RR: Gwangjo
- MR: Kwangjo

Kwang-jo, also spelled Kwang-cho, is a Korean given name.

People with this name include:

- Choi Kwang-jo (born 1942), South Korean taekwondo national champion
- Cho Kwangjo (1482–1519), Joseon Dynasty neo-Confucian reformer
- Yoon Kwang-cho (born 1946), South Korean ceramic artist

== See also ==
- List of Korean given names
