= Jin-sol =

- Hangul: 진솔
- RR: Jinsol
- MR: Chinsol

Jin-sol (Korean: 진솔) is a Korean given name.

People with this name include:

- Jinsoul (born Jeong Jin-sol, 1997), South Korean singer
- Kim Jin-sol (born 1993), South Korean beauty pageant titleholder
- Kim Jin-sol (footballer) (born 1989), South Korean footballer

== See also ==
- List of Korean given names
