= Jae-woong =

- Hangul: 재웅
- RR: Jaeung
- MR: Chaeung

Jae-woong, also spelled Jae-ung, is a Korean given name.

People with this name include:

- Jae U. Jung (born 1960), South Korean biologist
- Han Jae-woong (born 1984), South Korean football player
- Kim Jae-woong (born 1988), South Korean football player
- Lee Jae-woong (sledge hockey) (born 1996), South Korean sledge hockey player
- Chung Jae-woong (born 1999), South Korean speed skater
- Song Jae-ung (born 1945), South Korean diver

== See also ==
- List of Korean given names
