= Yi-soo =

- Hangul: 이수
- RR: Isu
- MR: Isu

Yi-soo, also spelled Yi-su, is a Korean given name.

== People ==
People with this name include:

- Kim Yi-Su (born 1953), South Korean judge

== Fictional characters ==
Fictional characters with this name include:

- Song Yi-soo, in 2011 South Korean television series 49 Days
- Seo Yi-soo, in 2012 South Korean television series A Gentleman's Dignity
- Han Yi-soo, in 2013 South Korean television series Shark
- Seo Yi-su, in 2020-2024 South Korean television series Sweet Home (TV Series)

== See also ==
- List of Korean given names
