= Na-rae =

- Hangul: 나래
- RR: Narae
- MR: Narae
- IPA: [naɾɛ]

Na-rae, also spelled Na-lae, is a Korean given name. The word itself is a native Korean word meaning "wing" and does not have corresponding hanja. However, since Korean given names can be created arbitrarily, it may also be a name with hanja (e.g. 娜萊).

== People ==
People with this name include:

- Lee Na-lae (born 1979), South Korean freestyle wrestler
- Park Na-rae, (born 1985), South Korean comedian
- Yun Na-rae (born 1997), South Korean artistic gymnast

== See also ==
- List of Korean given names
