= Hye-yeon =

- Hangul: 혜연
- RR: Hyeyeon
- MR: Hyeyŏn
- IPA: [hjɛjʌn]

Hye-yeon is a Korean given name.

People with this name include:

- Kang Hye-yeon (born 1990), South Korean trot singer
- Jo Aram (born Jo Hye-yeon, 2000), South Korean actress and former singer

== See also ==
- List of Korean given names
