= Ye-bin =

- Hangul: 예빈
- RR: Yebin
- MR: Yebin

Yebin or Ye-bin is a Korean given name.

People with this name include:

- Yebin Mok (born 1984), South Korean-born American figure ice skater
- Yoo Ye-bin (born 1992), South Korean beauty queen
- Yoon Ye-bin (born 1997), South Korean basketball player
- Baek Ye-bin (born 1997), South Korean singer, member of girl group DIA

== See also ==
- List of Korean given names
