= Ji-tae =

- Hangul: 지태
- RR: Jitae
- MR: Chit'ae

Ji-tae is a Korean given name.

People with this name include:

- Justin Chon (born Justin Jitae Chon, 1981), Korean-American actor
- Yoo Ji-tae (born 1976), South Korean actor and film director

Fictional characters with this name include:

- Ji-tae, in 2012 South Korean film A Werewolf Boy

== See also ==
- List of Korean given names
