= Ye-seo =

- Hangul: 예서
- RR: Yeseo
- MR: Yesŏ

Ye-seo is a Korean given name.

People with this name include:

- Dang Ye-seo (born 1981), naturalized South Korean table tennis player
- Jeon Ye-seo (born 1981), South Korean actress
- Kang Ye-seo (born 2005), South Korean singer and actress, member of girl group Madein

Fictional characters with this name include:

- Shin Ye-seo, in 2004 South Korean television series First Love of a Royal Prince
- Han Ye-seo, in 2006 South Korean television series Great Inheritance
- Kang Ye-seo, in 2018 South Korean television series Sky Castle

== See also ==
- List of Korean given names
