= Yun-suk =

- Hangul: 윤숙
- RR: Yunsuk
- MR: Yunsuk

Yun-suk, also spelled Yoon-sook or Youn-sook, is a Korean given name.

People with this name include:

- Moh Youn-sook (1910–1990), South Korean poet
- Hong Yun-suk (born 1925), South Korean poet
- Choi Yun-suk (born 1979), South Korean speed skater
- Kim Yoon-sook, South Korean badminton player; represented South Korea at the 1984 All England Open Badminton Championships

== See also ==
- List of Korean given names
