= Do-won =

- Hangul: 도원
- RR: Dowon
- MR: Towŏn

Do-won is a Korean given name.

People with this name include:

- Do Won Chang (born 1954), South Korean-born American businessman
- Kwak Do-won (born 1982), South Korean actor

Fictional characters with this name include:

- Park Do-won, in 2008 South Korean film The Good, the Bad, the Weird

== See also ==
- List of Korean given names
