= Joon-ki =

- Hangul: 준기
- RR: Jungi
- MR: Chun'gi

Joon-ki, also spelled Joon-gi, is a Korean given name.

- Min Joon-ki (born 1968), South Korean film director
- Lee Joon-gi (born 1982), South Korean actor
- Lee Jun-ki (born 1982), South Korean football player
- Choi Joon-gi (born 1994), South Korean football player

Fictional characters with this name include:

- Park Jun-ki, in 2002 South Korean television series Trio
- Kim Joon-ki, in 2014 South Korean film Innocent Thing
- Han Joon-gi, in 2020 Japanese video game Yakuza: Like a Dragon

== See also ==
- List of Korean given names
