= Hwa-yeon =

- Hangul: 화연
- RR: Hwayeon
- MR: Hwayŏn

Hwa-yeon (Korean: 화연) is a Korean given name. As of 2026, the name ranked 12,118th out of 36,179 male names and 1,094th out of 28,726 female names. A total of 170 people, consisting of 2 males and 170 females, were born with the name from 2008 to 2026.

Notable people with the name include:

- Hong Hwa-yeon, South Korean actress and model
- Son Hwa-yeon, South Korean footballer
- Cha Hwa-yeon, South Korean actress
- Won Hwa-yeon, South Korean idol and member of K-pop girl group Ifeye

== See also ==
- List of Korean given names
