= Ae-jung =

- Hangul: 애정
- RR: Aejeong
- MR: Aejŏng

Ae-jung is a Korean given name.

People with this name include:

- Lee Ae-jung (1987–2007), South Korean actress

Fictional characters with this name include:

- Gu Ae-jung, in 2011 South Korean television series The Greatest Love
- Cha Ae-jung, in 2013 South Korean television series Reply 1994

== See also ==
- List of Korean given names
