= Kyung-gu =

- Hangul: 경구
- RR: Gyeonggu
- MR: Kyŏnggu

Kyung-gu (Korean: 경구), also spelled Gyeong-gu or Kyŏnggu, is a Korean given name. Notable people with the name include:

- Sul Kyung-gu (born 1968), South Korean actor
- Jang Kyung-gu (born 1990), South Korean cyclist

== See also ==
- List of Korean given names
