= Hyun-seung =

- Hangul: 현승
- RR: Hyeonseung
- MR: Hyŏnsŭng

Hyun-seung, also spelled Hyon-sung, is a Korean given name.

People with this name include:

- Lee Hyun-seung (director) (born 1961), South Korean film director
- Lee Hyun-seung (baseball) (born 1983), South Korean baseball pitcher
- Lee Hyun-seung (footballer) (born 1988), South Korean football player
- Jang Hyun-seung (born 1989), South Korean singer

== See also ==
- List of Korean given names
