= Tae (Korean given name) =

- Hangul: 태
- RR: Tae
- MR: T'ae

Tae, also spelled Tai or Thae, is a Korean given name. Notable people with the name include:

- Buyeo Tae, Baekje prince, son of King Uija
- Wang T'ae, Goryeo prince, son of King Taejo

== See also ==
- List of Korean given names
