= Tae-won =

- Hangul: 태원
- RR: Taewon
- MR: T'aewŏn

Tae-won is a Korean given name.

People with this name include:

- Chey Tae-won (born 1960), South Korean businessman, chairman of SK Group
- Kim Tae-won (born 1965), South Korean guitarist
- Lee Tae-Won (born 1986), South Korean baseball player
- Noh Tae-won (born 1957), South Korean physicist
- Park Tae-Won (born 1977), South Korean football player

== See also ==
- List of Korean given names
