= Kwang-hyok =

- Hangul: 광혁
- RR: Gwanghyeok
- MR: Kwanghyŏk

Kwang-hyok, also spelled Gwang-hyeok, is a Korean given name.

People with this name include:

- Choi Kwang-hyouk (born 1987), North Korean-born South Korean sledge hockey player
- Ri Kwang-hyok (born 1987), North Korean football player
- Kim Kwang-hyok (athlete) (born 1988), North Korean long distance runner
- Lee Gwang-hyeok (born 1995), South Korean football player

== See also ==
- List of Korean given names
