= Hyuk-jae =

- Hangul: 혁재
- RR: Hyeokjae
- MR: Hyŏkchae

Hyuk-jae is a Korean given name.

People with this name include:

- Lee Hyuk-jae (born 1973), South Korean comedian
- Eunhyuk (born Lee Hyuk-jae, 1986), South Korean singer, member of Super Junior
- Jae Yoo (born Yoo Hyuk-jae, 1989), South Korean model
- Kim Hyuk-jae, South Korean bass guitarist, member of 24Hours

== See also ==
- List of Korean given names
