= Seok-ho =

- Hangul: 석호
- RR: Seokho
- MR: Sŏkho

Seok-ho, also spelled Suk-ho, is a Korean given name.

People with this name include:

- Yoon Seok-ho (born 1957), South Korean television director
- Hur Suk-ho (born 1973), South Korean golfer
- David Chang (Korean name Chang Seok-ho; born 1977), American chef and entrepreneur of Korean descent
- Hwang Seok-ho (born 1989), South Korean football player

== See also ==
- List of Korean given names
