= Tae-soo =

- Hangul: 태수
- RR: Taesu
- MR: T'aesu

Tae-soo is a Korean given name.

People with this name include:

- Kim Tae-su (born 1981), South Korean football midfielder
- Jun Tae-soo (born 1984), South Korean actor
- Park Tae-soo (born 1989), South Korean football defender

Fictional characters with this name include:

- Tae-soo Park, character in manga Sun-Ken Rock

== See also ==
- List of Korean given names
