= Jung-mo =

- Hangul: 정모
- RR: Jeongmo
- MR: Chŏngmo

Jung-mo is a Korean given name.

People with this name include:

- Jung-Mo Lee (born 1944), South Korean cognitive psychologist
- Yang Jung-mo (born 1953), South Korean freestyle wrestler
- Jung Mo Sung (born 1957), South Korean-born Brazilian theologian
- Koo Jungmo (born 2000), South Korean singer, member of Cravity

== See also ==
- List of Korean given names
