= Dong-gun =

- Hangul: 동건
- RR: Donggeon
- MR: Tonggŏn

Dong-gun, also spelled Dong-geon, is a Korean given name.

People with this name include:

- Jang Dong-gun (born 1972), South Korean actor
- Lee Dong-gun (born 1980), South Korean actor
- Cho Dong-geon (born 1986), South Korean football player
- No Dong-geon (born 1991), South Korean football player

== See also ==
- List of Korean given names
