= Won-young =

- Hangul: 원영
- RR: Wonyeong
- MR: Wŏnyŏng

Won-young (Korean: 원영) is a Korean given name. As of 2026, the name ranked 801st out of 36,179 male names and 790th out of 28,726 female names. A total of 796 people, consisting of 459 males and 337 females, were born with the name from 2008 to 2026.

Notable people with the name include:

- Jang Won-young, South Korean singer and member of the South Korean girl group Ive
- Choi Won-young, birth name Choi Seong-wook, South Korean actor
- Lee Won-young, South Korea footballer

== See also ==
- List of Korean given names
