= Sung-sook =

- Hangul: 성숙
- RR: Seongsuk
- MR: Sŏngsuk

Sung-sook, also spelled Song-suk, is a Korean given name.

People with this name include:

- Jung Sung-sook (born 1972), South Korean judo practitioner
- O Song-suk (born 1977), North Korean long-distance runner

== See also ==
- List of Korean given names
