= Chul-soon =

Korean given name

- Hangul: 철순
- RR: Cheolsun
- MR: Ch'ŏlsun

Chul-soon is a Korean given name.

People with this name include:

- Park Chul-soon (born 1956), South Korean baseball player
- Hwang Chul-soon (born 1957), South Korean former boxer
- Choi Chul-soon (born 1987), South Korean footballer

== See also ==
- List of Korean given names
