= Jin-hwan =

- Hangul: 진환
- RR: Jinhwan
- MR: Chinhwan

Jin-hwan is a Korean given name.

People with this name include:

- Shinjiro Hiyama (born Hwang Jin-hwan, 1968), Zainichi Korean baseball player
- Shon Jin-hwan (born 1968), South Korean badminton player
- Kim Jin-hwan (footballer) (born 1989), South Korean football defender

== See also ==
- List of Korean given names
