= Byung-woo =

- Hangul: 병우
- RR: Byeongu
- MR: Pyŏngu

Byung-woo is a Korean given name.

People with this name include:

- Bae Bien-u (born 1950), South Korean photographer
- Lee Byung-woo (born 1965), South Korean guitarist and composer
- Kim Byung-woo (born 1980), South Korean film director

== See also ==
- List of Korean given names
