= Bo-yeon =

- Hangul: 보연
- RR: Boyeon
- MR: Poyŏn

Bo-yeon is a Korean given name.

People with this name include:

- Kim Bo-yeon (born 1957), South Korean actress
- Lee Si-eon (born Lee Bo-yeon, 1982), South Korean actor

== See also ==
- List of Korean given names
