= Seung-yoon =

- Hangul: 승윤
- RR: Seungyun
- MR: Sŭngyun

Seung-yoon is a Korean given name.

People with this name include:

- Oh Seung-yoon (born 1991), South Korean actor
- Kang Seung-yoon (born 1994), South Korean singer, member of boy band Winner
- Lee Seung-yun (born 1995), South Korean archer

== See also ==
- List of Korean given names
