= Se-bin =

- Hangul: 세빈
- RR: Sebin
- MR: Sebin

Se-bin is a Korean given name.

People with this name include:

- Myung Se-bin (born 1976), South Korean actress
- Ha Sebin (born 1983), South Korean male guitarist
- Park Se-bin (born 2000), South Korean female figure skater

Fictional characters with this name include:

- Jo Se-bin, in 2011 South Korean romance film Hindsight

== See also ==
- List of Korean given names
