= Kyung-mo =

- Hangul: 경모
- RR: Gyeongmo
- MR: Kyŏngmo

Kyung-mo is a Korean given name.

People with this name include:

- Kim Kyung-mo (김경모, born 1989), South Korean baseball player
- Kim Kyung-mo (김경모, born 1988), South Korean Starcraft player
- Park Kyung-Mo (born 1975), South Korean archer
- Sung Kyung-Mo (born 1980), South Korean football player

== See also ==
- List of Korean given names
