= Jun-sang =

- Hangul: 준상
- RR: Junsang
- MR: Chunsang

Jun-sang also spelled Joon-sang, is a Korean given name.

People with this name include:

- Choi Jun-sang (born 1978), South Korean equestrian
- Yoo Jun-sang (born 1969), South Korean actor

Fictional characters with this name include:

- Kang Joon-sang, in 2012 South Korean television series Winter Sonata

== See also ==
- List of Korean given names
