= Eun-ah =

- Hangul: 은아
- RR: Euna
- MR: Ŭna
- IPA: [ɯna]

Eun-ah is a Korean given name.

People with this name include:

- Ko Eun-ah (actress, born 1946), South Korean actress
- Hong Eun-ah (born 1980), South Korean football referee
- Go Eun-ah (born Bang Hyo-jin, 1988), South Korean actress
- Seo Eun-ah (born 1989), South Korean actress

== See also ==
- List of Korean given names
- Euna Lee (Korean: 이승은; born 1972), South Korean-born American journalist
- Euna Kim (Korean: 김유나; born 1994), American rapper in South Korea
