= Jun-ha =

- Hangul: 준하
- RR: Junha
- MR: Chunha

Jun-ha, also spelled Chun-ha or Joon-ha, is a Korean given name.

People with this name include:

- Chang Chun-ha (1918–1975), Korean independence activist, later a South Korean journalist and politician
- Jeong Jun-ha (born 1971), South Korean comedian
- Yoon Jun-ha (born 1987), South Korean football player
- Lee Joon-ha (born 2001), South Korean child actress

Fictional characters with this name include:

- Junah, one of the title characters of the 2001 South Korean film Wanee & Junah

== See also ==
- List of Korean given names
