= So-hye =

- Hangul: 소혜
- RR: Sohye
- MR: Sohye
- IPA: [sohe]

So-hye is a Korean given name.

People with this name include:

- Kim So-hye (1992) (born 1992), South Korean actress
- Kim So-hye (born 1999), South Korean actress and singer

== See also ==
- List of Korean given names
