= Ga-in =

- Hangul: 가인
- RR: Gain
- MR: Kain

Ga-in is a Korean given name.

People with this name include:

- Han Ga-in (born 1982), South Korean actress
- Song Ga-in (born 1986), South Korean trot singer, Miss Trot season 1 winner
- Son Ga-in (born 1987), South Korean singer and actress, member of Brown Eyed Girls

== See also ==
- List of Korean given names
