= Ji-hae =

- Hangul: 지해
- RR: Jihae
- MR: Chihae

Ji-hae is a Korean given name.

People with this name include:

- Jeong Ji-hae (fl. 1700s), Joseon Dynasty archaeologist
- Jung Ji-hae (born 1985), South Korean handball player

== See also ==
- Ji-Hae Park (박지혜; born 1985), South Korean violinist
- Jihae (musician) (김지혜; born c. 1989), South Korean singer and actress
- List of Korean given names
