= Sung-mi =

- Hangul: 성미
- RR: Seongmi
- MR: Sŏngmi

Sung-mi, also spelled Seong-mi or Song-mi, is a Korean given name.

People with the name include:

- Hong Sung-mi (born 1986), stage name Dana (South Korean singer)
- Michelle Wie (Korean name Wie Seong-mi, born 1989), American golfer of Korean descent
- Yun Song-mi (born 1992), North Korean football defender

Fictional characters with the name include:

- Ji Seong-mi, character played by Im Seo-yeon in 2009 South Korean television series Three Brothers
- Ma Seong-mi, character played by Kim Min-hee in 2012 South Korean television series I Do, I Do
- Sungmi, character played by Naomi Ko in 2014 American satirical drama film Dear White People

== See also ==
- List of Korean given names
