= Jae-woo =

- Hangul: 재우
- RR: Jaeu
- MR: Chaeu
- IPA: [tɕɛu]

Jae-woo is a Korean given name.

People with this name include:

- Gwak Jae-u (1552–1617), Joseon Dynasty general
- Lee Jae-woo (handballer) (born 1979), South Korean handball player
- Lee Jae-woo (baseball) (born 1980), South Korean baseball player
- Lee Jae-woo (badminton) (born 1992), South Korean badminton player
- Bae Jae-woo (born 1993), South Korean football player
- Choi Jae-woo (born 1994), South Korean freestyle skier
- Kim Jae-woo (born 1998), South Korean football player

== See also ==
- List of Korean given names
