= Man-hee =

- Hangul: 만희
- RR: Manhui
- MR: Manhŭi

Man-hee, also spelled Man-hui, is a Korean given name.

People with this name include:

- Lee Man-hee (born 1931), South Korean religious leader
- Lee Man-hee (film director) (born 1931), South Korean film director
- Ban Hyo-jung (born Ban Man-hee, 1942), South Korean actress
- Choi Man-hee (born 1956), South Korean football player

== See also ==
- List of Korean given names
