= Yoo-suk =

- Hangul: 유석
- RR: Yuseok
- MR: Yusŏk
- IPA: [jusʌk̚]

Yoo-suk, also spelled Yoo-seok or Yu-seok, is a Korean given name.

People with this name include:

- Chung Yoo-suk (born 1977), South Korean footballer
- Kim Yoo-suk (born 1982), South Korean pole vaulter
- Kim Yu-seok (born 1966), South Korean actor

== See also ==
- List of Korean given names
