= In-sik =

- Hangul: 인식
- RR: Insik
- MR: Insik

In-sik, also spelled In-shik, is a Korean given name.

People with this name include:

- Hwang In-shik (born 1940), South Korean hapkido teacher
- Kim In-sik (born 1947), South Korean baseball manager
- Chun In-shik (born 1968), South Korean sprint canoer
- Lee In-sik (born 1983), South Korean footballer

== See also ==
- List of Korean given names
