= Woo (Korean given name) =

- Hangul: 우
- RR: U
- MR: U
- IPA: [u]

Woo, also spelled Wu, or U, is a is a Korean given name. Notable people with the name include:

- Ch'oe U (1166–1249), military leader of Goryeo
- Wang U (1079–1122), the personal name of King Yejong of Goryeo
- Wang U (1365–1389), the personal name of King U of Goryeo
- Yi U (1912–1945), member of the Korean Imperial household and grandson of Emperor Gojong
- Park Woo (born 1972), South Korean wrestler

== See also ==
- List of Korean given names
