= Hee-sung =

- Hangul: 희성
- RR: Huiseong
- MR: Hŭisŏng

Hee-sung, also spelled Hee-seong, is a Korean given name.

People with this name include:

- Jung Hee-sung (born 1945), South Korean poet
- Park Hee-sung (born 1987), South Korean football player
- Kwak Hee-sung (born 1990), South Korean actor
- Lee Hee-seong (born 1990), South Korean football player
- Park Hee-seong (born 1990), South Korean football player

Fictional characters:

- Baek Hee-sung, a character in television series Flower of Evil

== See also ==
- List of Korean given names
