= Ji-woon =

- Hangul: 지운
- RR: Jiun
- MR: Chiun

Ji-woon, also spelled Jee-woon or Ji-un, is a Korean given name.

People with this name include:

- Ji-un of Tamna (fl. 483–508), 27th king of Tamna
- Kim Jee-woon (born 1964), South Korean film director and screenwriter
- Kim Ji-woon (footballer) (born Kim Bong-rae, 1990), South Korean footballer
- Min Jiwoon (born 1999), South Korean singer and songwriter

Fictional characters with this name include:

- Kang Ji-woon, from the 2014 television series Angel Eyes
- Ji-Woon Hak, known in-game as "The Trickster", from the 2016 video game Dead by Daylight

== See also ==
- List of Korean given names
