= Ju-ho =

- Hangul: 주호
- RR: Juho
- MR: Chuho
- IPA: [tɕuho]

Ju-ho, also spelled Joo-ho, is a Korean given name.

People with this name include:

- Park Joo-ho (born 1987), South Korean footballer
- Lee Ju-ho (born 1961), South Korean economist
- Kang Ju-ho (born 1989), South Korean footballer

== See also ==
- List of Korean given names
