= Kwang-seok =

- Hangul: 광석
- RR: Gwangseok
- MR: Kwangsŏk

Kwang-seok, also spelled Kwang-suk or Gwang-seok, is a Korean given name.

People with this name include:

- Kim Kwang-seok (born 1936), South Korean martial artist, founder of the Sib Pal Gi Association
- Kim Kwang-seok (1964–1996), South Korean folk rock singer
- Jung Kwang-seok (born 1970), South Korean football player and manager
- Lee Kwang-suk (born 1975), South Korean footballer
- Kim Gwang-seok (wrestler) (born 1977), South Korean Greco-Roman wrestler
- Kim Gwang-seok (footballer) (born 1983), South Korean footballer

== See also ==
- List of Korean given names
