= Ki-nam =

- Hangul: 기남
- RR: Ginam
- MR: Kinam

Ki-nam, also spelled Gi-nam, is a Korean given name.

People with this name include:

- Paul Roh Ki-nam (1902–1984), Korean Catholic bishop
- Kim Ki-nam (politician) (born 1926), North Korean politician
- Nam Gi-nam (1942–2019), South Korean film and cartoon director

== See also ==
- List of Korean given names
