= Jae-gyu =

- Hangul: 재규
- RR: Jaegyu
- MR: Chaegyu

Jae-gyu, also spelled Jae-kyu or Jae-kyoo, is a Korean given name.

People with this name include:

- Kim Jae-gyu (1926–1980), South Korean politician and army lieutenant general
- Lee Jae-kyoo (born 1970), South Korean director
- Park Jae-kyu, South Korean academic

== See also ==
- List of Korean given names
- Kang Je-gyu (born 1962), South Korean director
