= Kyung-wan =

- Hangul: 경완
- RR: Gyeongwan
- MR: Kyŏngwan

Kyung-wan, also spelled Kyung-oan, is a Korean given name.

People with this name include:

- Park Kyung-oan (born 1972), South Korean male baseball catcher
- Lim Gyoung-wan (born 1975), South Korean male baseball pitcher
- Jeongyeon (born Yoo Kyung-wan, 1996), South Korean female singer, member of Twice

Fictional characters with this name include:

- Lee Kyung-wan, male supporting character in 2011 South Korean television series City Hunter
- Jang Kyung-wan, male supporting character in 2016 South Korean television series The Promise
- Park Kyung-wan, male supporting character in 2017 South Korean television series Stranger

== See also ==
- List of Korean given names
