= Sung-ha =

- Hangul: 성하
- RR: Seongha
- MR: Sŏngha

Sung-ha, also spelled Seong-ha, is a Korean given name.

People with this name include:

- Jo Sung-ha (born 1966), South Korean actor
- Jeon Sung-ha (born 1987), South Korean footballer
- Jeong Seongha (born 1996), South Korean YouTube celebrity
- Joo Seong-ha, North Korean journalist who defected to South Korea

== See also ==
- List of Korean given names
