= Seung-chul =

- Hangul: 승철
- RR: Seungcheol
- MR: Sŭngch'ŏl

Seung-chul, also spelled Seung-cheol or Sung-chol, is a Korean given name.

People with this name include:

- Park Seung-cheol (1940–2014), South Korean infectious disease specialist
- Lee Seung-chul (born 1966), South Korean singer
- Baek Seung-chul (born 1975), South Korean football player
- Lee Seung-chul (wrestler) (born 1988), South Korean wrestler
- S.Coups (born Choi Seung-cheol, 1995), South Korean rapper, member of Seventeen

== See also ==
- List of Korean given names
