= Kang-min =

- Hangul: 강민
- RR: Gangmin
- MR: Kangmin
- IPA: [kɐŋ.min]

Kang-min is a Korean given name.

People with this name include:

- Kim Kang-min (baseball) (born 1982), South Korean baseball player
- Lee Kang-min (footballer) (born 1985), South Korean football player
- Lee Kang-min (actor) (born 1990), South Korean actor
- Kim Kang-min (actor, born 1995), South Korean actor
- Kim Kang-min (actor, born 1998), South Korean actor
- Yoo Kang-min (stage name Kangmin, born 2003), South Korean singer and actor, member of boy band Verivery

== See also ==
- List of Korean given names
