= Jin-joo =

- Hangul: 진주
- RR: Jinju
- MR: Chinju
- IPA: [t͡ɕiɲd͡ʑu]

Jin-joo, also spelled Jin-ju, is a Korean given name.

People with this name include:

- Hong Jin-joo (born 1983), South Korean female professional golfer
- JinJoo Lee (born 1987), South Korean female guitarist
- Park Jin-joo (born 1988), South Korean actress
- Moon Jin-ju (born 1990s), South Korean female wrestler

== See also ==
- List of Korean given names
