= Young-geun =

- Hangul: 영근
- RR: Yeonggeun
- MR: Yŏnggŭn

Young-geun, also spelled Young-keun or Yung-keun, is a Korean given name.

People with this name include:

- Choi Yung-keun (1923–1994), South Korean footballer
- Kim Young-keun (born 1990), South Korean footballer
- Song Young-keun, South Korean politician; see List of members of the National Assembly (South Korea), 2012–

== See also ==
- List of Korean given names
