= Hyun-mi =

- Hangul: 현미
- RR: Hyeonmi
- MR: Hyŏnmi
- IPA: [çʌn.mi]

Hyun-mi, also spelled Hyun-mee, is a Korean given name.

People with this name include:

- Joo Hyun-mi (born 1961), South Korean trot singer
- Kim Hyun-mee (politician) (born 1962), South Korean politician
- Kim Hyun-mee (handballer) (born 1967), South Korean team handball player
- Son Hyeon-mi (born 1972), South Korean judo practitioner
- Oh Hyun-mi (born 1986), South Korean volleyball player
- Choi Hyun-mi (born 1990), North Korean-born South Korean boxer

== See also ==
- List of Korean given names
