= Yeon-seok =

- Hangul: 연석
- RR: Yeonseok
- MR: Yŏnsŏk

Yeon-seok, also spelled Yun-suk, is a Korean given name.

People with this name include:

- Hwang Yeon-seok (born 1973), South Korean football player
- Yoo Yeon-seok (born 1984), South Korean actor

== See also ==
- List of Korean given names
