= Jung-jin =

- Hangul: 정진
- RR: Jeongjin
- MR: Chŏngjin

Jung-jin is a Korean given name.

People with this name include:

- Park Jung-jin (born 1976), South Korean baseball pitcher
- Lee Jung-jin (born 1978), South Korean actor
- Seo Jung-jin (born 1989), South Korean football midfielder (K-League Challenge)
- Lee Jung-jin (footballer) (born 1993), South Korean football midfielder (K-League Challenge)

== See also ==
- List of Korean given names
