= Yong-hwa (name) =

- Hangul: 용화
- RR: Yonghwa
- MR: Yonghwa

Yong-hwa is a Korean given name.

People with this name include:

- Kim Yong-hwa (born 1971), South Korean film director
- Jung Yong-hwa (born 1989), South Korean musician, member of CNBLUE

== See also ==
- List of Korean given names
- Cha Yong-hwa (차영화; born 1990), North Korean artistic gymnast
