= Yong-nam =

- Hangul: 용남
- RR: Yongnam
- MR: Yongnam

Yong-nam is a Korean given name.

== People ==
People with this name include:

- Sin Yong-nam (born 1978), North Korean footballer
- Kwon Yong-nam (born 1985), South Korean footballer
- Ri Ryong-nam (리룡남), North Korean politician, member of the Cabinet of North Korea

== See also ==
- List of Korean given names
- Kim Yong-nam (Korean: 김영남; 1928–2025), North Korean politician, Chairman of the Presidium of the Supreme People's Assembly
