= Na-yeon (given name) =

- Hangul: 나연
- RR: Nayeon
- MR: Nayŏn

Na-yeon (Korean: 나연) is a Korean given name. Notable people with the name include:

- Choi Na-yeon (born 1987), South Korean golfer
- Kwon Na-yeon, South Korean singer, actress, and dancer
- Im Na-yeon, South Korean singer
- Shim Na-yeon, South Korean director
