= Deok-cheol =

- Hangul: 덕철
- RR: Deokcheol
- MR: Tŏkch'ŏl

Deok-cheol (Korean: 덕철) is a Korean given name. Notable people and fictional characters with the name include:

- Kwon Deok-cheol (born 1961), South Korean government official
- Yang Deok-cheol, minor character in the 2019 South Korean TV series Trap

== See also ==
- Jang Deok Cheol, South Korean vocal group
