= Hwa-young =

- Hangul: 화영
- RR: Hwayeong
- MR: Hwayŏng
- IPA: [ɸwajʌŋ]

Hwa-young (화영) is a Korean given name.

People with this name include:

- Lee Hwa-young (fencer), South Korean fencer, bronze medalist in fencing at the 1994 Asian Games
- Lim Hwa-young (born 1984), South Korean actress
- Ryu Hwa-young (born 1993), South Korean singer, former member of T-ara
- Lee Hwa-young (born 1996), South Korean singer, former member of Boys24/Unit Sky

Fictional characters with this name include:

- Hwa-yeong, the protagonist of 1986 South Korean film Gilsoddeum
