= Bok-hee =

- Hangul: 복희
- RR: Bokhui
- MR: Pokhŭi

Bok-hee or BokHee (Korean: 복희) is a Korean given name. Notable people with the name include:

- BokHee An, Korean-American nurse
- Lee Bok-hee (born 1978), South Korean judoka
- Myoung Bok-hee (born 1979), South Korean handball player
- Song Bok-hee, South Korean TV show host
- Yoon Bok-hee, South Korean singer
