= Jae-myung =

- Hangul: 재명
- RR: Jaemyeong
- MR: Chaemyŏng

Jae-myung or Jae-myong (Korean: 재명) is a Korean given name. Notable people with this name include:

- Lee Jae-myung (born 1964), a South Korean politician
- Lee Jae-myung (footballer) (born 1991), a South Korean football player
- Park Jae-myong (born 1981), a South Korean javelin thrower
- Sim Jae-myung (born 1989), another South Korean football player
- Yoo Jae-myung (born 1973), a South Korean actor

== See also ==
- Hyun Jae-myung (현제명, 1902–1960), a South Korean composer
