= Han-sol =

- Hangul: 한솔
- RR: Hansol
- MR: Hansol

Han-sol (Korean: 한솔) is a Korean given name. Notable people with the name include:

- Ha Han-sol (born 1993), South Korean sabre fencer
- Kim Han-sol (born 1995), North Korean man, grandson of Kim Jong-il
- Kim Han-sol (gymnast) (born 1995), South Korean gymnast
- Kwon Han-sol, South Korean actress
- Lee Han-sol (born 1995), South Korean handball player
- Park Han-sol, South Korean actress
