= Hyuk-kyu =

- Hangul: 혁규
- RR: Hyeokgyu
- MR: Hyŏkkyu

Hyuk-kyu or Hyeok-kyu (Korean: 혁규) is a Korean given name. Notable people with the name include:

- Kim Hyuk-kyu, South Korean League of Legends player
- Kim Hyuk-kyu (politician), South Korean businessman and politician
- Kwon Hyeok-kyu (born 2001), South Korean football midfielder
