= Choi Jong-ok =

South Korean volleyball player (born 1945)

Personal information
- Born: August 15, 1945 (age 81)

- Choi Jong-ok
- Hangul: 최종옥
- Hanja: 崔宗玉
- RR: Choe Jongok
- MR: Ch'oe Chongok

Choi Jong-ok (born 15 August 1945) is a South Korean former volleyball player who competed in the 1972 Summer Olympics.
