= Jong-chul =

- Hangul: 종철
- RR: Jongcheol
- MR: Chongch'ŏl

Jong-chul (Korean: 종철) is a Korean given name. Notable people with the name include:

- Baek Jong-chul (born 1961), former South Korean football forward
- Beak Jong-chul (born 1975), South Korean curler
- Kim Jong-chul (poet) (1947–2014), South Korean poet
- Kwon Jong-chul (born 1963), retired South Korean football referee
- Park Jong-chul (1965–1987), South Korean democracy activist
