= Nam-joo =

- Hangul: 남주
- RR: Namju
- MR: Namju

Nam-joo (Korean: 남주) is a given name. Notable people with the name include:

- Cho Nam-joo (Korean: 조남주; born 1978), South Korean writer and author
- Kim Nam-joo (Korean: 김남주; born 1971), South Korean actress
- Kim Nam-joo (Korean: 김남주; born 1995), South Korean singer and actress
- Kwon Nam-joo (Korean: 권남주; born c. 1999), South Korean Overwatch player
