= Soon-young =

- Hangul: 순영
- RR: Sunyeong
- MR: Sunyŏng

Soon-young (Korean: 순영) is a Korean given name. Notable people with the name include:

- Choi Soon-Young, South Korean businessman
- Choi Soon-young (born 1953), South Korean politician
- Hong Soon-young (1937–2014), South Korean diplomat
- Huh Soon-young (born 1975), South Korean handball player
- Jin Soon-young (born 1971), South Korean sports shooter
- Kwon Soon-young, South Korean singer and dancer
