= Chan-soo =

- Hangul: 찬수
- RR: Chansu
- MR: Ch'ansu

Chan-soo or Chan-su (Korean: 찬수) is a Korean given name. Notable people with the name include:

- Bae Chan-soo (born 1998) South Korean football midfielder
- Kim Chan-soo (born 2001), South Korean football midfielder
- Kwon Chan-soo (born 1974), South Korean football goalkeeper
