= O-kyu =

- Hangul: 오규
- RR: Ogyu
- MR: Ogyu

O-kyu or Oh-gyu (Korean: 오규) is a Korean given name. Notable people with the name include:

- Kim Oh-gyu (born 1989), South Korean football defender
- Kwon O-kyu, South Korean politician
