= Yeo Myung-yong =

South Korean footballer

Yeo Myung-Yong
Personal information
- Full name: Yeo Myung-Yong
- Date of birth: 11 June 1987 (age 39)
- Place of birth: South Korea
- Height: 1.90 m (6 ft 3 in)
- Position: Goalkeeper

Team information
- Current team: Goyang Hi FC
- Number: 23

Youth career
- 2006–2009: Hanyang University

Senior career*
Years	Team	Apps	(Gls)
2010–2012	Busan TC	46	(0)
2013–	Goyang Hi FC	65	(0)
- * Club domestic league appearances and goals as of 20 December 2015

Yeo Myung-Yong (Korean: 여명용; born 11 June 1987) is a South Korean footballer who plays as goalkeeper for Goyang Hi FC in K League Challenge.

== Career ==
Yeo joined Busan TC after graduating from Hanyang University.

He was selected by Goyang Hi FC in the 2013 K League draft and made his first appearance for Goyang in the league match on 23 March.
