= Jung-hyuk =

- Hangul: 정혁
- RR: Jeonghyeok
- MR: Chŏnghyŏk

Jung-hyuk (Korean: 정혁) is a Korean given name. Notable people with the name include:

- Jang Jung-hyuk, North Korean defector and mixed martial artist
- Kim Jung-hyuk (footballer) (born 1968), South Korean football manager and former midfielder
- Kim Jung-hyuk (author), South Korean author and cartoonist
- Kwon Jung-hyuk (born 1978), South Korean football goalkeeper
- Lee Jung-hyuk, South Korean actor and model
