= Eun-bin =

- Hangul: 은빈
- RR: Eunbin
- MR: Ŭnbin

Eun-bin (Korean: 은빈) is a Korean given name. Notable people with the name include:

- Kim Eun-bin (born 2003), South Korean curler
- Kwon Eun-bin, South Korean singer and actress
- Park Eun-bin, South Korean actress
