= Yong-guk =

- Hangul: 용국
- RR: Yongguk
- MR: Yongguk

Yong-guk or Yong-kook (Korean: 용국) is a Korean given name. Notable people with the name include:

- Bang Yong-guk (born 1990), South Korean singer-songwriter
- Kim Yong-kook, South Korean fencer
