= Yeong-guk =

- Hangul: 영국
- RR: Yeongguk
- MR: Yŏngguk

Yeong-guk or Yeong-gug (Korean: 영국) is a Korean given name. Notable people with the name include:

- Kwon Yeong-guk, South Korean politician and lawyer
- Yeo Yeong-gug, South Korean politician
