= Chi-Won Yoon =

South Korean financier and executive

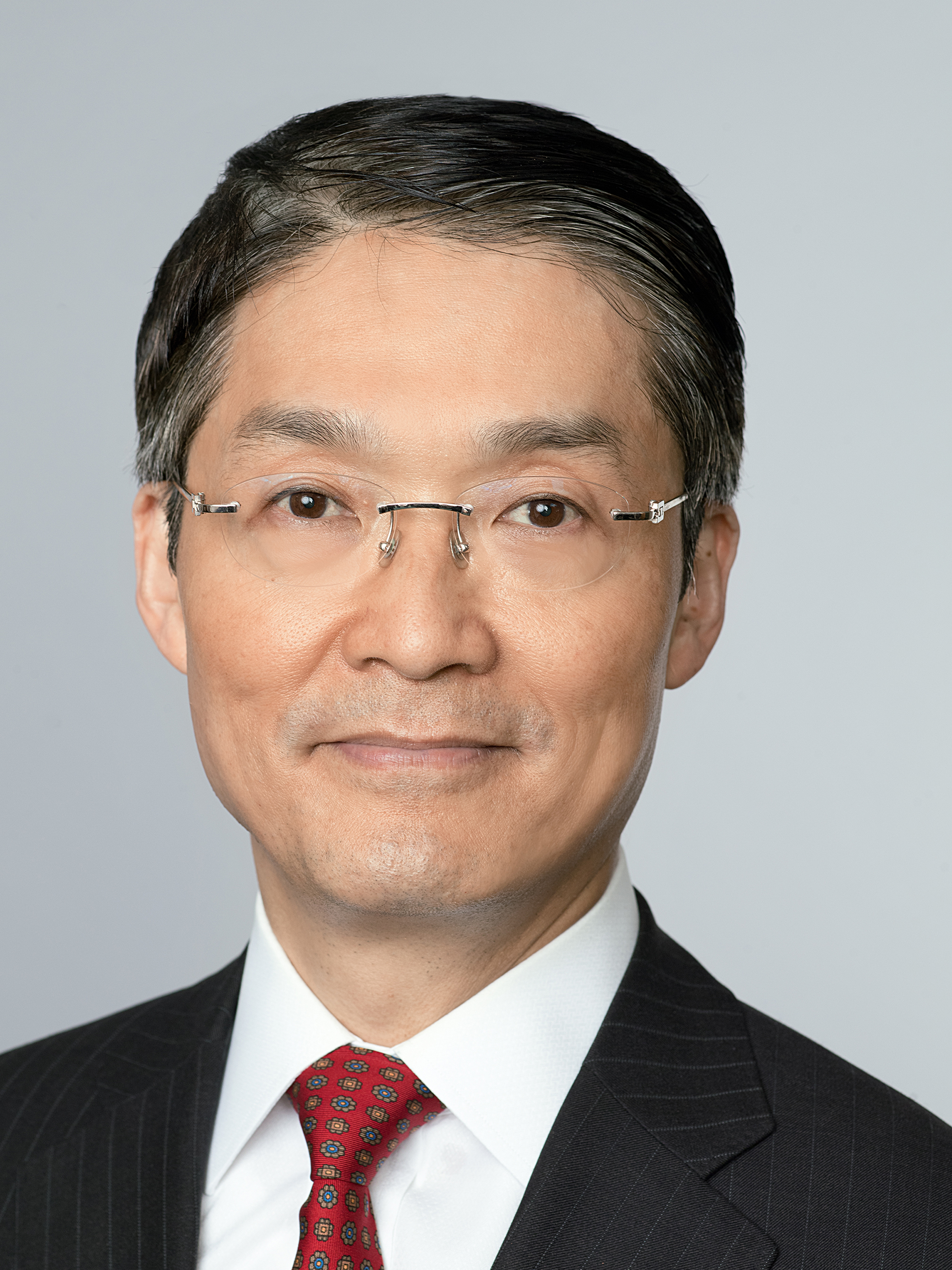

Personal details
- Born: 2 June 1959 (age 67) South Korea
- Education: Massachusetts Institute of Technology, MIT Sloan

Korean name
- Hangul: 윤치원
- Hanja: 尹致遠
- RR: Yun Chiwon
- MR: Yun Ch'iwŏn

Chi-Won Yoon (Korean: 윤치원; born 2 June 1959) is a South Korean financier and executive. Formerly president of UBS Group Asia Pacific, he stepped down in 2016 after nearly seven years in the position to take a sabbatical.

He was also a member of the board of UBS Securities Co. Ltd. and chair of the Asian Executive Board of the MIT Sloan School of Management.

== Education ==
Yoon studied electrical engineering at the Massachusetts Institute of Technology, where he graduated with a bachelor's degree in 1982 and with a Master in Management in 1986 from the MIT Sloan School of Management.

== Career ==
Yoon's career in financial services began after his graduation in 1986. He worked for Merrill Lynch in New York City and for Lehman Brothers in New York and in Hong Kong.

In 1997, Yoon joined UBS as Head of Equity Derivatives. He began to oversee Asian Equities in 2004. In March 2008, he was appointed Head of UBS Securities Business at UBS Hong Kong, replacing Kathryn Shih. From June 2009 until November 2010, he served as CEO and Chairman of UBS AG Asia Pacific, succeeding Rory Tapner. From November 2010 he held the position of co-CEO and co-chairman, and in March 2012 he was appointed again as sole CEO of UBS Group Asia Pacific. His role in the APAC region involves leading UBS Wealth Management, Investment Banking and Asset Management.

Yoon also worked as an electrical engineer in satellite communications, conducting research work on satellite communications at NASA.

== Other activities ==
Before stepping down, he was in the board of directors of UBS Securities Co. Ltd and in the UBS Group Executive Board since June 2009. Yoon holds the position of Chairman of the Asian Executive Board for the MIT Sloan School of Management and is a member of the advisory board of the MIT Golub Center for Finance and Policy.
