= Da-kyung =

- Hangul: 다경
- RR: Dagyeong
- MR: Tagyŏng

Da-kyung or Da-gyeong (Korean: 다경) is a Korean given name. Notable people with the name include:

- Choi Da-kyung (born 2000), South Korean football striker
- Han Da-kyung (born 2000), South Korean swimmer
- Kwon Da-kyung, South Korean football midfielder
