= Dae-hee =

- Hangul: 대희
- RR: Daehui
- MR: Taehŭi

Dae-hee (Korean: 대희) is a Korean given name. Notable people with the name include:

- Ahn Dae-hee, South Korean politician
- Kwon Dae-hee (born 1989), South Korean footballer
- Lee Dae-hee (born 1974), South Korean footballer
