= Gi-pyo =

- Hangul: 기표
- RR: Gipyo
- MR: Kip'yo

Gi-pyo (Korean: 기표) is a Korean given name. Notable people with the name include:

- Kwon Gi-pyo (born 1997), South Korean footballer
- Park Gi-pyo, South Korean entertainer
