= Han-byul =

- Hangul: 한별
- RR: Hanbyeol
- MR: Hanbyŏl

Han-byul is a Korean given name. Notable people with the name include:

- Jang Han-byul (born 1990), Australian singer, actor, producer, and television personality
- Park Han-byul (born 1984), South Korean actress and model
- Lim Han-byul (born 1989), South Korean singer and songwriter
