= Song-hwa =

- Hangul: 송화
- RR: Songhwa
- MR: Songhwa

Song-hwa (Korean: 송화) is a Korean given name. Notable people with the name include:

- Cho Song-hwa (born 1993), South Korean volleyball player
- Kwon Song-hwa (born 1992), North Korean football forward
- Yoo Song-hwa (born 1968), South Korean politician
