= Jung-in =

- Hangul: 정인
- RR: Jeongin
- MR: Chŏngin

Jung-in, also spelled Jeong-in, is a Korean given name.

People with this name include:

- Seo Jeong-in (born 1936), South Korean male novelist
- Moon Chung-in (born 1951), South Korean male political scientist
- Choi Jung-in (born 1980), South Korean female pop singer
- Park Jeong-in (born 2000), South Korean male footballer
- Yang Jeong-in (born 2001), stage name I.N, South Korean male singer, member of boy group Stray Kids
- Jung-in case, which centered on a 16-month-old girl who died on October 20, 2020, by after months of abuse by hands of her adoptive parents that caused outrage in South Korea
