= Soon-hyung =

- Hangul: 순형
- RR: Sunhyeong
- MR: Sunhyŏng

Soon-hyung (Korean: 순형) is a Korean given name. Notable people with the name include:

- Kim Soon-hyung (born 1973), South Korean middle-distance runner
- Kwon Soon-hyung (born 1986), South Korean football midfielder
