= Yi Ch'ae (born 1745) =

Joseon civil official (1745–1820)

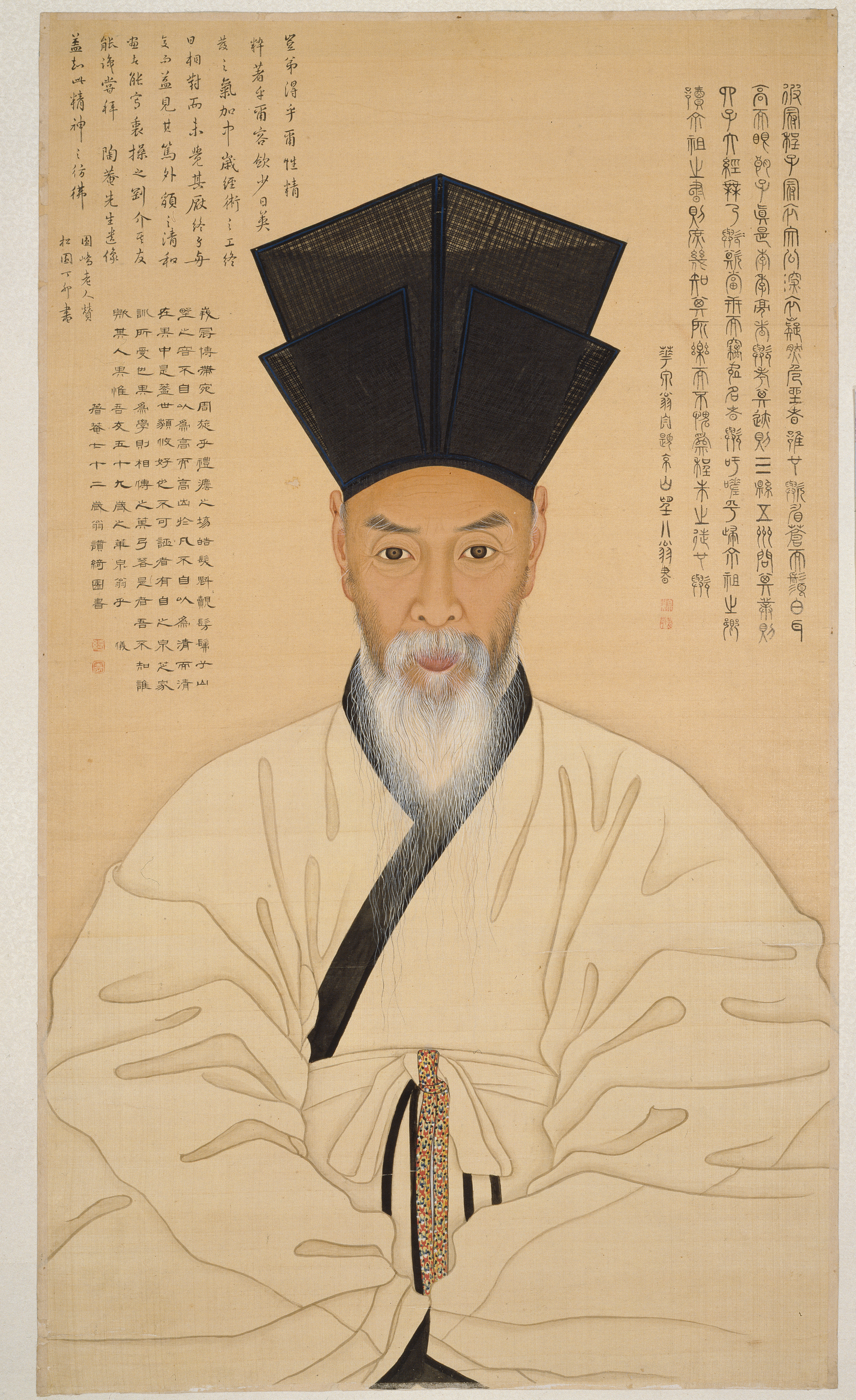

Korean name
- Hangul: 이채
- Hanja: 李采
- RR: I Chae
- MR: I Ch'ae

Art name
- Hangul: 화천
- Hanja: 華泉
- RR: Hwacheon
- MR: Hwach'ŏn

Courtesy name
- Hangul: 계량
- Hanja: 季亮
- RR: Gyeryang
- MR: Kyeryang

Posthumous name
- Hangul: 문경
- Hanja: 文敬
- RR: Mungyeong
- MR: Mun'gyŏng

Yi Ch'ae (Korean: 이채; Hanja: 李采; 1745–1820) was a Korean civil official who served the Joseon dynasty during the reigns of King Jeongjo and Sunjo.

== Biography ==
Yi Ch'ae was born on 1745 in Goyang, Gyeonggi Province, as the son of censor-general (대사간; 大司諫; taesagan) Yi Che-wŏn (이제원; 李濟遠), of the Ubong Yi clan, and his wife, Lady Hong. His grandfather was Yi Chae (이재; 李濟縡). His family background belonged to the Noron political faction. His art name was Hwach'ŏn and his courtesy name was Kyeryang.

In 1774, Yi Ch'ae would pass the literary licentiate examination, and in the following year, he would be appointed to his first government post of assistant caretaker of the Hwiryŏngjŏn (휘령전참봉; 徽寧殿參奉; Hwiryŏngjŏn ch'ambong). He would then go on to serve various positions, such as assistant section chief of the Ministry of Taxation (호조좌랑; 戶曹佐郞; hojo chwarang), an inspector from the Office of the Inspector-General (사헌부 감찰; 司憲府 監察; sahŏnbu kamch'al), section chief of the Ministry of Taxation (호조정랑; 戶曹佐郞; hojo chŏngnang), and recorder of the Royal House Administration (돈녕부 주부; 敦寧府 主簿; tonnyŏngbu chubu). By 1780, he was the magistrate of Eumjuk-hyeon. Due to false allegations against him, he was dismissed from his government post.

In 1790, he was able to serve the government once more, being appointed as the magistrate of Jirye-hyeon (in modern-day Gimcheon). When he arrived at Jirye, the flooded Gamcheon river had just damaged the local area. Yi built a dyke to prevent further flooding and to aid the local farmers. In 1800, when King Sunjo ascended to the throne, he was appointed as a guard (위솔; 衛率; wisol) in the Standby Guard for Heir Apparent (세자익위사; 世子翊衛司; seja ikwisa). His final posts in the government would be the deputy minister of the Ministry of Taxation (호조참판; 戶曹參判; hojo ch'ampan) and the second magistrate of Hanseong (한성부좌윤; 漢城府左尹; Hansŏng-bu chwayun). Yi Ch'ae died in 1820, and was buried in Chungju. He was given the posthumous name, Mungyŏng. In 1886, his great-grandson, Yi Ho-ik (이호익; 李鎬翼) would publish his great-grandfather's collected works in the Hwach'ŏnjib.
