= Chul-woo =

- Hangul: 철우
- RR: Cheolu
- MR: Ch'ŏru

Chul-woo is a Korean given name. People with this name include:

- Lim Chul-woo (born 1954), South Korean writer
- Lee Cheol-woo (born 1955), South Korean politician
- Park Chul-woo (born 1965), South Korean football player
- Jang Chul-woo (born 1971), South Korean football player
- Choi Chul-woo (born 1977), South Korean football player
- Park Chul-woo (volleyball) (born 1985), South Korean volleyball player
