= Jae-chul =

- Hangul: 재철
- RR: Jaecheol
- MR: Chaech'ŏl

Jae-chul (Korean: 재철), also spelled Jae-cheol, is a Korean given name. Notable people with the name include:

- Shim Jae-chul, South Korean journalist and politician
- Shin Jae-chul, South Korean martial artist
