= Soon-chun =

- Hangul: 순천
- RR: Suncheon
- MR: Sunch'ŏn

Soon-chun (Korean: 순천) is a Korean given name. Notable people with the name include:

- Kwon Soon-chun (born 1959), South Korean retired boxer
- Song Soon-chun (1934–2019), South Korean amateur boxer
