= Hyo-kyeong =

- Hangul: 효경
- RR: Hyogyeong
- MR: Hyogyŏng

Hyo-kyeong (Korean: 효경) is a Korean given name. Notable people with the name include:

- Kwon Hyo-kyeong (born 2001), South Korean wheelchair fencer
- Lee Hyo-kyeong (born 1997), South Korean football defender
