= Yong-dae =

- Hangul: 용대
- RR: Yongdae
- MR: Yongdae

Yong-dae is a Korean given name. Notable people with the name include:

- Lee Yong-dae (born 1988), professional badminton player
- Kim Yong-dae (footballer) (born 1979), South Korean former football goalkeeper

== See also ==
- Kim Yong-dae (politician) (김영대; born 1937), North Korean politician
