= Yol (Korean name) =

- Hangul: 열
- RR: Yeol
- MR: Yŏl

Yol (Korean: 열) is a Korean given name. Notable people with this name include:

- Pak Yŏl (1902–1974), a Korean independence activist
- Kim Yol (1918 – after 1956), a North Korean politician

== See also ==
- Jeong Yol (정욜; born 1978), a South Korean LGBT activist
