= Daesan Literary Awards =

- Awarded for: Poetry, fiction, drama, literary criticism, translation
- Country: South Korea
- Presented by: Daesan Foundation
- First award: 1993
- Website: Official website (In Korean)

The Daesan Literary Awards (Korean: 대산문학상) are one of the most prestigious literary awards in South Korea. Prizes are awarded annually to selected works of poetry, fiction, drama, literary criticism, and translation. As of 2016, each prize includes a monetary award of 50 million won. The award-winning works are often subsequently translated from Korean to other languages and published overseas.

== Winners ==
Year	Category	Winner	Work
1993	Poetry	Ko Un	Songs for Tomorrow
1993	Fiction	Yi Seungu	The Other Side of Life
1993	Drama	O Taeseok	Why Did Shimch'ong Throw Herself Into the Indangsu Twice?
1993	Criticism	Baek Nakcheong	Viewpoint of Modern Literature
1993	Translation	Peter H. Lee	Pine River and Lone Peak (English translation)
1994	Poetry	Lee Hyeonggi	Undying City
1994	Fiction	Yi Cheong-jun	White Clothes
1994	Drama	—	—
1994	Criticism	Kim Uchang	A Jewel of a Poet
1994	Translation	Choe Yun & Patrick Maurus	La Place by Choi In-hoon (French translation)
1995	Poetry	Hwang Tong-gyu	Strong Wind at Misiryong
1995	Fiction	Choe Inseok	My Soul's Well
1995	Drama	Yi Yun-taek	Yeonsan, A Problematic Person
1995	Criticism	Yu Chong-Ho	The Delights of Literature
1995	Translation	Chung Chong-Hwa & Brother Anthony	The Poet by Yi Munyeol (English translation)
1996	Poetry	Chong Hyon-jong	The Trees of the World
1996	Fiction	Yi Hocheol	Southerners and Northerners
1996	Drama	Lee Kang-baek	Diary of a Journey to Yongwo
1996	Criticism	—	—
1996	Translation	Kim Mi-Hye & Silvia Bräsel	Windbestattun by Hwang Tong-gyu (German translation)
1997	Poetry	Kim Chunsu	Possession, Dostoevsky
1997	Fiction	Park Wanseo	Was That Mountain Really There?
1997	Drama	—	—
1997	Criticism	Kim Byung-Ik	New Writing and Truth of Literature
1997	Translation	—	—
1998	Poetry	Shin Kyeong-nim	Mother's and Grandmother's Silhouette
1998	Fiction	Kim Joo-young	The Skate
1998	Drama	Lee Man-Hee	Turn Around and Leave
1998	Criticism	Cho Nam-Hyon	Literary Discourse in the 1990s
1998	Translation	—	—
1999	Poetry	Hwang Ji-u	One Day I Will Sit in a Dimly-Lit Bar
1999	Fiction	Seo Jeong-in	A Man Who I Met in Venice
1999	Drama	Noh Kyung-Sik	Wind of a Thousand Years
1999	Criticism	Kim Jong-Chul	A Poetry Human and an Ecological Human
1999	Translation	Choi Mi-Kyung & Jean Noël Juttet	Le Chant de la fidèle Chunhyang (French translation)
2000	Poetry	Choi Seungho	Grotesque
2000	Fiction	Lee Yun-gi	Dumulmeori
2000	Drama	—	—
2000	Criticism	Oh Saeng-Keun	The House Being Constructed with Nostalgia
2000	Translation	Ko Kwang-Dan & Jean Noël Juttet	L'Envers de la vie (French translation)
2001	Poetry	Lee Sungboo	Mt. Chiri
2001	Fiction	Hwang Sok-yong	The Guest
2001	Drama	Lee Gun-Sam	Magnificent Escape
2001	Criticism	Choi Won-Shik	The Return of Literature
2001	Translation	Lee In-Sook, Kim Kyung-Hee, & Maryse Bourdin	Talgung by Su Jung-In (French translation)
2002	Poetry	Kim Chi-ha	Flowering
2002	Fiction	Kim Wonu	Nostalgia Essay of a Wayfarer
2002	Drama	Kim Myung-Hwa	The First Birthday
2002	Criticism	Kim Yun-Shik	Dialogue with Our Novel
2002	Translation	Yu Young-Nan	Everlasting Empire by Yi In-hwa (English translation)
2003	Poetry	Kim Kwang-kyu	The Time We First Met
2003	Fiction	Song Giwon	The Scent of a Human
2003	Drama	—	—
2003	Criticism	—	—
2003	Translation	Kim Edeltrud & Kim Sun-Hi	Vogël by O Jeonghui (German translation)
2004	Poetry	Lee Seong-bok	Ah, Mouthless Things
2004	Fiction	Yun Heunggil	Road to Soradan
2004	Drama	Park Sang-Hyun	The Lady Living in Room 405 Is Very Nice
2004	Criticism	Hwang Gwang-Soo	Finding Road, Making Road
2004	Translation	Park Hwang-Bae	A vista de cuervo y otros poemas by Yi Sang (Spanish translation)
2005	Poetry	Kim Myung-In	Ripple
2005	Fiction	Kim Yeonsu	I'm a Ghost Writer
2005	Drama	—	—
2005	Criticism	Jeong Gwa-Ri	Desire of That Which We Call Literature
2005	Translation	Francisca Cho	Everything Yearned For by Han Yong-un (English translation)
2006	Poetry	Kim Sa-in	Quietly Liking
2006	Fiction	Kim Insuk	That Woman's Autobiography
2006	Drama	Park Keun-hyeong	Kyeong-suk, Kyeong-suk's Father
2006	Criticism	Choi Dong-ho	Poetic Magic in a Muddy Heaven
2006	Translation	Jeong Eun-jin & Jacques Batilliot	Le vieux jardin by Hwang Sok-yong (French translation)
2007	Poetry	Nam Jin-woo	A Lion at 3:00 AM
2007	Fiction	Kim Hoon	Namhansanseong
2007	Drama	Bae Sam-Sik	A Record of Yeolha
2007	Criticism	Kim Yeong-Chan	Ghosts in the Theatre of Criticism
2007	Translation	Kang Seung-Hee, Oh Dong-Sik, & Torsten Zaiak	Die Geschichte des Herrn Han by Hwang Sok-yong (German translation)
2008	Poetry	Kim Hyesoon	Your First
2008	Fiction	Gu Hyo-seo	Nagasaki Papa
2008	Drama	Jung Bokgeun	A Package
2008	Criticism	Kim Inhwan	A Crisis of Meaning
2008	Translation	—	—
2009	Poetry	Song Chanho	The Evening the Cat Returned
2009	Fiction	Park Bum-shin	Gosanja
2009	Drama	—	—
2009	Criticism	Lee Kwangho	Anonymous Love
2009	Translation	Bruce Fulton, Ju-Chan Fulton, & Gicheong Gim	There a Petal Silently Falls by Choe Yun (English translation)
2010	Poetry	Choe Seungja	Lonely and Faraway
2010	Fiction	Park Hyoung-su	Nana at Dawn
2010	Drama	Choe Jina	Chasuk's Home, 1 Dong 28
2010	Criticism	Kim Chi-su	Wounds and Cures
2010	Translation	Choe Ae-young & Jean Bellemin-Noell	Interdit de folie (French translation)
2011	Poetry	Dalja Shinwon	Papers
2011	Fiction	Im Cheolu	Farewell Valley
2011	Drama	Choi Chieon	Play of Insanity
2011	Criticism	Yeom Moo-woong	Literature and Reality of the Era
2011	Translation	Heidi Kang & Sohyun Ahn	Schwertgesang by Hoon Kim (German translation)
2012	Poetry	Paek Musan	All Edges
2012	Fiction	Jung Young-moon	The World of a Certain Title of Nobility
2012	Drama	—	—
2012	Criticism	Hwang Hyonsan	Well-Explained Misfortune
2012	Translation	Ko Hyeson & Francisco Karansa	Los arobles en la cuesta (Spanish translation)
2013	Poetry	Jin Eun-young	A Stealing Song
2013	Fiction	Kim Sum	Women and Their Evolving Enemies
2013	Drama	Koh Yeon-ok	Father in a Scabbard
2013	Criticism	—	—
2013	Translation	Choi Yang-hee	Jehol Journal by Pak Chiwŏn (English translation)
2021	Poetry	Kim Eon	Dear Blank Paper
2021	Fiction	Choi Eun-young	Bright Night
2021	Drama	Cha Geun-ho	Man with a Typewriter
2021	Criticism	—	—
2021	Translation	Choi Don-mee	Autobiography of Death by Kim Hye-soon (English translation, poetry collection)
2023	Poetry	Kim Gi-taek	낫이라는 칼
2023	Fiction	Hyun Ki-young	제주도우다
2023	Drama	Lee Yang-gu	당선자 없음
2023	Translation	Martias Augustine, Park Gyeong-hui	German translation of 고래 by Cheon Myeong-gwan
