= Hankook Ilbo Literary Award =

The Hankook Ilbo Literary Award (한국일보문학상) is a South Korean literary award. It is one of South Korea's most prestigious literary awards, established in 1968 by Hankook Ilbo. It is awarded annually to the creative literary work published within the year.

== Winners ==
Year	Author (Hanguel)	Author (English)	Title(Hanguel)	Title(English)
1968	한말숙	Han Malsook	《신과의 약속》	A Promise with God
1969	방영웅	Bang Young-ung	《달》	The Moon
1970	오유권	Oh Yu-kwon	《일가의 몰락》	
1971	강용준	Kang Yong-jun	《광인일기》	
1972	이문구	Lee Mun-ku	《장한몽》	The Dream of Everlasting Sorrow
1973	신상웅	Shin Sang ung	《심야의 정담》	
1974	정을병	Chung Uel-Byoung	《병든 지구》	
1975	이청준	Yi Chong-jun	《이어도》	
1976	유현종	Yoo Hyeon-jong	《들불》	
1977	이병주	Lee Byeong-ju	《망명의 늪》	
1978	김문수	Kim Moon-soo	《육아》	Childcare
1979	김원일	Kim Won-il	《도요새에 관한 명상》	
1980	이동하	Lee Dong-ha	《굶주린 혼》	Fatigue Soul
1981	최일남	Choi Il-nam	《홰치는 소리》 《세 고향》	
1982	윤흥길	Yun Heunggil	《꿈꾸는 자의 나성》	A Dreamer's Fortress
1983	김원우	Kim Wonu	《불면수심》	
1984	임철우	Lim Chulwoo	《아버지의 땅》	My Father's Land
1985	윤후명	Yun Humyong	《섬》	Island
1986	서정인	Seo Jeong-in	《달궁》	The Moon Bow
1987	이제하	Lee Ze-ha	《광화사》	The Temple of a Mad Painter
1988	박태순	Park Taesun	《밤길의 사람들》	
1989	이인성	Lee Insung	《한없이 낮은 숨결》	
1990	김영현	Kim Young-hyun	《저 깊푸른 강》	
1991	하창수	Ha Changsu	《돌아서지 않는 사람들》	
1992	이창동	Lee Chang-dong	《녹천에는 똥이 많다》	
1993	신경숙	Shin Kyung-sook	《풍금이 있던 자리》	The Place Where the Harmonium Once Was
1994	구효서	Gu Hyo-seo	《깡통따개가 없는 마을》	Village Without a Can Opener
1995	김인숙	Kim Insuk	《먼 길》	The Long Road
1996	전경린	Jon Kyongnin	《염소를 모는 여자》	A Woman Driving a Goat
1997	성석제 / 윤영수	Sung Sukje / Yoon Youngsu	《유랑》/ 《착한 사람 문성현》	
1998	이혜경	Lee Hye-kyung	《그 집 앞》	
1999	현기영	Hyun Ki-young	《지상의 숟가락 하나》	One Spoon on This Earth
2000	하성란	Ha Seong-nan	《기쁘다 구주 오셨네》	Joy to the World
2001	오수연	Oh Soo-yeon (novelist)	《땅위의 영광》	
2002	은희경	Eun Heekyung	《누가 꽃피는 봄날 리기다 소나무 숲에 덫을 놓았을까》	
2003	배수아	Bae Suah	《일요일 스키야키 식당》	Sunday at the Sukiyaki Restaurant
2004	김경욱	Kim Kyung-uk	《장국영이 죽었다고?》	Leslie Chung is Dead?
2005	김애란	Kim Aeran	《달려라 아비》	Run, Daddy, Run
2006	강영숙	Kang Young-sook	《리나》	Rina
2007	편혜영	Pyun Hye-young	《사육장 쪽으로》	To the Kennels
2008	김태용	Kim Taeyong (writer)	《풀밭 위의 돼지》	The Pig on the Grass
2009	한유주	Han Yujoo	《막》	
2010	황정은	Hwang Jung-eun	《백의 그림자》	One hundred Shadows
2011	최제훈	Choi Jae-hoon	《일곱 개의 고양이 눈》	Seven Cat Eyes
2012	권여선	Kwon Yeo-sun	《레가토》	
2013	손보미	Son Bo-mi	《산책》	
2014	이기호	Lee Ki-ho	《차남들의 세계사》	
2015	전성태	Jeon Sungtae	《두번째 자화상》	
2016	윤성희	Yoon Sung-hee	《베개를 베다》	
2017	정세랑	Chung Serang	《피프티피플》	Fifty People
2018	최은영		《내게 무해한 사람》	
