= Hochul (disambiguation) =

Hochul may refer to:

- Hochul (given name), people with the given name Hochul
- Hochul (surname), people with the surname Hochul
