= Ho-cheol =

- Hangul: 호철
- RR: Hocheol
- MR: Hoch'ŏl
- IPA: [hotɕʰʌɭ]

Ho-cheol, Ho-chul or Ho-chirl is a Korean given name.

People with the name include:

- Chang Ho-chirl (born 1962), South Korean singer
- Kim Ho-chul (born 1955), South Korean volleyball coach and former player
- Yi Hocheol or Lee Hochul (1932–2016), South Korean author
  - Lee Hochul Literary Prize for Peace, international literary award named after him

== See also ==
- Hochul (surname)
