= Kim Tae-yong (disambiguation) =

Kim Tae-yong (born 1969) is a South Korean film director.

Kim Tae-yong may also refer to:

- Kim Taeyong (writer) (born 1974), South Korean writer
- Kim Tae-yong (director, born 1987), South Korean film director and screenwriter
