= Wu Zhenyu =

Wu Zhenyu may refer to following individuals of which name in Chinese character can be transliterated to Hanyu Pinyin:

- Allan Wu (born 1972), Singapore actor, his birth name is Wú Zhènyǔ (吳振宇)
- Francis Ng (吳鎮宇, pinyin: Wú Zhènyǔ, born 1961), Hong Kong actor and director
- O Jin-u (吳振宇, pinyin: Wú Zhènyǔ, 1917–1995), North Korean general and politician

== See also ==
- Allan (disambiguation)
- Francis (disambiguation)
- Jin-woo
- O (surname)
- Wu (surname)
