= Ae-ran Kim (writer) =

South Korean writer (born 1980)

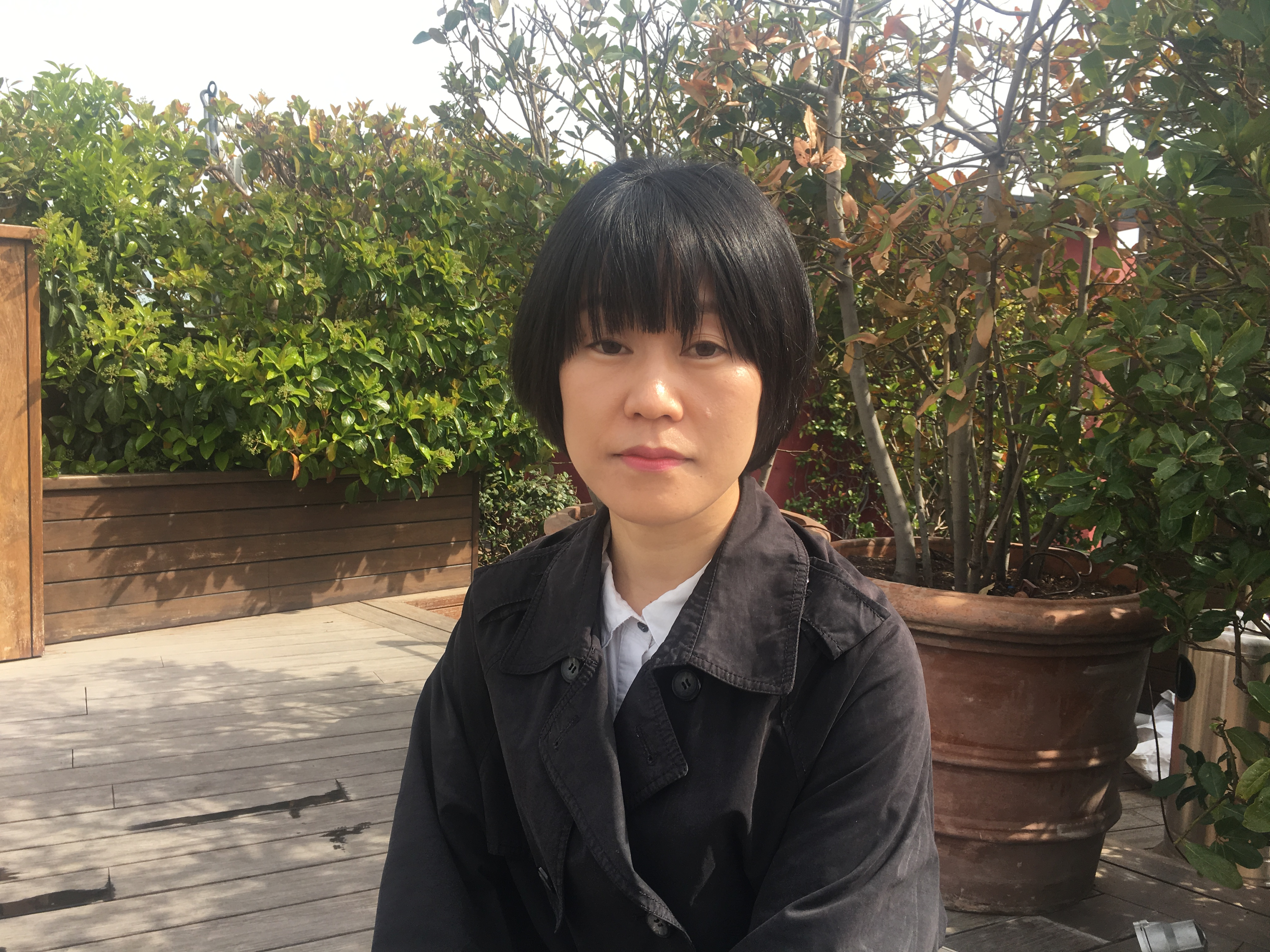
- Ae-ran Kim
- Born: 1980 (age 45–46); Incheon
- Education: Korea National University of Arts
- Occupation: Writer
- Writing career
- Language: Korean
- Notable work: No Knocking in This House

- Korean name
- Hangul: 김애란
- Hanja: 金愛爛
- RR: Gim Aeran
- MR: Kim Aeran

Ae-ran Kim (Korean: 김애란; born 1980) is a South Korean writer.

== Life ==
Kim was born in Incheon in 1980. She is a graduate of the Korea National University of Arts.

== Work ==
Kim's debut work "No Knocking in This House," a short story published in 2003, is about five women living in five separate rooms in a boarding house, where the rooms are tiny and close together. It won Daesan Literary Award.

Next, her short story collection, Run, Daddy, Run, entered the spotlight, earning her the Hankook Ilbo Literary Award in 2005. Twenty-five years old at the time of the award, Kim was the youngest award winner ever recorded, which was all the more unprecedented as she was also a new writer who had not yet published any short story collections.

In 2008, her short story "Knife Marks" won the Yi Hyosŏk Literary Award. Likewise, she was the youngest to ever be awarded this prize.

Kim's stories feature young people in their 20s who have moved up to Seoul from other parts of the country. After industrialization and urbanization began in earnest in the 1960s, Korean literature frequently dealt with the subject of young people who turned their backs on their hometowns to come to Seoul. However, though young people continued to move to the capital after the new millennium, literary interest in their stories began to decrease. Because Kim spent most of her childhood growing up in a rural village called Seosan and only began living in Seoul in her 20s, she imbues the lives of the characters in her stories with a strong sense of realism.

She originally studied playwriting in college, and perhaps for that reason her stories reveal an unusual interest in small, run-down spaces. The short story "Christmas Special" takes place in a run-down inn, while "Run, Daddy, Run" and "Happy Life" are set in half-basement rooms. "I Go to the Convenience Store" features the intensively capitalistic space of a convenience store, and the backdrop of "Sky Kong Kong" is a rooftop room in a small provincial city. Her humorous depiction of the people who live in these spaces evokes a rich pathos.

Her 2011 novel My Brilliant Life is a touching story of a 17-year-old boy with progeria, a disease that cause rapid aging; he prepares to bid farewell to his thirty-something parents, who had him when they were teenagers. It was a bestseller, and in 2014 was adapted into the E J-yong film My Brilliant Life starring Kang Dong-won and Song Hye-kyo. The English translation of the novel is scheduled to be published by Forge Books in January, 2021.

== Personal life and teaching career ==
In 2014, she was writer in residence at the Institute for Advanced Studies in the Humanities, University of Edinburgh.

== Awards ==
- Daesan Literary Award (2002)
- Hankook Ilbo Literary Award (2005)
- Yi Hyosŏk Literary Award
- Yi Sang Literary Award (2013)
- Prix de l'Inaperçu Literary Award (2014)

== Works in translation ==
- Ascending Scales (From Words Without Borders)
- Knife Marks (From LTI Korea)
- Christmas Specials (Asia Publishing)
- 老爸，快跑 (달려라, 아비)
- Cours papa, cours! (달려라, 아비)
- "The Future of Silence" (in The Future of Silence Fiction By Korean Women)
- Corre, pare, corre! (달려라, 아비) (Godall edicions, 2017) ISBN 978-84-945094-7-6]
- ¡Corre, papá, corre! (달려라, 아비)(Godall Edicions, 2018)
- My Brilliant Life (두근두근 내 인생) (Forge Books, 2021) ISBN 978-1-2507-5055-6]
