= Choe Inseok =

South Korean writer (born 1953)

- 최인석
- Born: 17 September 1953; Namwon, Jeollabuk-do, South Korea
- Occupations: Writer, playwright, screenwriter
- Writing career
- Notable awards: Daesan Literary Awards, Baeksang Arts Awards, etc.

Choe Inseok (Korean: 최인석, born September 17, 1953) is a South Korean writer, playwright, and screenwriter. His work explores political and social struggle, and he has received multiple literary awards.

== Early life and career ==
Choe was born in Namwon, Jeollabuk-do, to a journalist father. He enrolled in university in 1972, to study playwriting. In 1977, he attended a playwriting workshop led by Yoh Suk-kee, a professor of English literature at Korea University.

His debut play, Byeokgwa Chang (벽과 창, The Wall and the Window), won the Monthly Korean Literature New Writer's Award in 1980. During the 1980s, Choe wrote plays such as Eotteon Saramdo Sarajiji Anneunda (어떤 사람도 사라지지 않는다, No One Disappears), which won the Baeksang Arts Awards in 1983 and the Yeonghui Play Award in 1985. His plays from this period address marginalization and social unrest.

Choe began writing fiction in 1986 with the novel Gugyeongkkun (구경꾼, The Onlooker), which won the Novelists’ Award. His novel Nae Yeonghonui Oomul (내 영혼의 우물, The Well of My Soul) received the Daesan Literary Award in 1995.

== Literary style and themes ==
Choe’s works often portray individuals on the margins of society. Scholar Hwang Jong-yeon notes that his characters "often emerge from politically radical backgrounds" and exist in settings highlighting social inequality, such as prisons, construction sites, and urban districts. His narratives explore alienation, state control, and personal resilience.

== Selected works ==
=== Novels ===
- Gangcheolmujigae (강철무지개, Iron Rainbow), 2014
- Tugikkundeuleul wihan membership training (투기꾼들을 위한 멤버십 트레이닝, Membership Training for Speculators), 2013
- Yeonae, haneun nal (연애, 하는 날, A Day of Love), 2011
- Geudaereul ileun nalbuteo (그대를 잃은 날부터, From the Day I Lost You), 2010
- Yaktali sijakdwaetda (약탈이 시작됐다, The Looting Has Begun), 2010
- Isanghan nara-eseo on spai (이상한 나라에서 온 스파이, The Spy From a Strange Country), 2003
- Seokeoseu seokeoseu (서커스 서커스, Circus Circus), 2002
- Aneseo bakkateseo (안에서 바깥에서, From the Inside From the Outside), 1992
- Nae maeumeneun akeoga sanda (내 마음에는 악어가 산다, A Crocodile Lives in My Mind), 1990
- Gugyeongkkun (구경꾼, The Onlooker), 1986

=== Short story collections ===
- Moksumui gieok (목숨의 기억, The Memory of Life), 2006
- Gureongideului jib (구렁이들의 집, The House of Serpents), 2001
- Areumdaun na-ui Gwisin (아름다운 나의 鬼神, My Beautiful Ghost), 1999
- Nareul saranghan pyein (나를 사랑한 폐인, The Cripple Who Loved Me), 1998
- Hondoneul hyanghayeo hangeoleum (혼돈을 향하여 한걸음, A Step Towards Chaos), 1997
- Nae yeonghonui oomul (내 영혼의 우물, The Well of My Soul), 1995
- Inhyeongmandeulgi (인형만들기, Making Dolls), 1991
- Saette (새떼, A Flock of Birds), 1988

=== Works in translation ===
- Der Brunnen meiner Seele (German)
- Le puits de mon âme (French)

== Awards ==
- 2003 – 8th Hahn Moo-Sook Literary Prize
- 1997 – 8th Park Young-joon Literary Prize
- 1995 – 3rd Daesan Literary Award
- 1988 – 27th Grand Bell Award in Dramatization
- 1985 – Yeonghui Play Award
- 1985 – Korean Literature Prize New Writers Award
- 1983 – 19th Baeksang Arts Awards New Writers Award
- 1980 – Korean Literature New Writers Award
