= Lee Hochul Literary Prize for Peace =

International literary award

- Awarded for: A writer whose works have dealt with themes of peace in human society
- Sponsored by: Eunpyeong-gu District Office (Seoul)
- Country: Republic of Korea
- Hosted by: Organizing Committee
- First award: 2017
- Website: https://lbch.kr/award/outline.php

The Lee Hochul Literary Prize for Peace (Korean: 이호철 통일로 문학상) is an international literary award which takes place in South Korea annually in order to recognize the power of literature to promote peace. There are two awards: the main Lee Hochul Literary Prize for Peace, and a Special Award that is given to an young and upcoming Korean writer. The main prize winner receives a monetary sum of 40 million won, while the Special Award winner receives 20 million won.

The Lee Hochul Literary Prize for Peace was established in 2017 by the Eunpyeong-gu District Office of Seoul, South Korea, in honor of the author Lee Ho-cheol. Lee Ho-chul is a symbolic figure whose literary works reflect a deep longing for peace and the reunification of Korean peninsula.

== Recipients ==
=== The Grand Prize Laureate ===
Year	Name	Nationality
2026	Juan Gabriel Vásquez	Colombia
2025	Hyun Ki-young	South Korea
2024	Anna Burns	Ireland
2023	Medoruma Shun	Japan
2022	Yan Lianke	China
2021	Jenny Erpenbeck	Germany
2020	Arundhati Roy	India
2019	Nuruddin Farah	Somalia/The Republic of South Africa
2018	Sahar Khalifeh	Palestine
2017	Kim Suk-bum	Korea/Japan

=== The Special Award Laureate ===
Year	Name	Title
2026	Seo Sujin	If I'm Not the Mother
2025	Kim Ki-chang	Masan
2024	Kim Mella	High Sense of the Nonexistent Floor
2023	Jin Eun-young	And I Love You like an Old Street
2022	Jang Mari	The Strangers in Siberia
2021	Sim Yun-kyung	Eternal Heritage
2020	Kim Hye-jin	The Work of No.9
2019	Kim Chong-kwang	Let's Go on a Picnic
2018	Song Kyung-dong	I Am Not a Korean
2017	Kim Soom	One Person
