= Soo-yeon =

- Hangul: 수연
- RR: Suyeon
- MR: Suyŏn
- IPA: [su.jʌn]

Soo-yeon, also spelled Su-yeon or Soo-yun, is a Korean given name.

People with this name include:

== Entertainers ==
- Kang Soo-yeon (born 1966), South Korean actress
- Oh Soo-yeon (born 1968), South Korean female television screenwriter
- Chunja (singer) (born Hong Su-yeon, 1979), South Korean female singer
- Cha Soo-yeon (born 1981), South Korean actress
- Han Soo-yeon (born Lee Mae-ri, 1983), South Korean actress
- Jessica Jung (Korean name Jung Soo-yeon, born 1989), Korean-American female singer, former member of girl group Girls' Generation
- Sheon (Born Kim Su-yeon, 2003), South Korean singer, member of girl group Billlie

== Sportspeople ==
- Kang Soo-yun (born 1976), South Korean female golfer
- Kim Soo-yun (born 1983), South Korean female footballer
- Seo Su-yeon (born 1986), South Korean female para table tennis player
- Soo Yeon Lee (born 1984), South Korean female table tennis player and model
- Choi Soo-yeon (born 1990), South Korean female sabre fencer
- Back Su-yeon (born 1991), South Korean female swimmer
- Jo Su-yeon (born 1994), South Korean female handball player
- Kim Su-yeon (born 2001), South Korean female pair skater
- Eom Su-yeon (born 2001), South Korean female ice hockey player

== Others ==
- Won Soo-yeon (born 1961), South Korean female manhwa artist
- Oh Soo-yeon (novelist) (born 1964), South Korean female novelist
- Lea Seong (born Seong Su-yeon, 1989), South Korean fashion designer

== Fictional characters ==
- Bae Su-yeon, in 2003 South Korean film A Tale of Two Sisters
- Ji Soo-yeon, in 2013 South Korean television series Iris II: New Generation
- Lee Soo-yeon, in 2012 South Korean television series Missing You
- Yoon Su-yun, in 2016 South Korean film Train to Busan
- Lee Soo-yeon, in 2018 South Korean television series Where Stars Land

== See also ==
- List of Korean given names
