= Jin-woo =

- Hangul: 진우
- RR: Jinu
- MR: Chinu
- IPA: [t͡ɕinu]

Jin-woo is a Korean given name.

== People ==
People with this name include:

=== Political figures ===
- Song Jin-woo (journalist) (1889–1945), Korean journalist and independence activist
- O Jin-u (1917–1995), North Korean soldier and politician
- Stephen Jin-Woo Kim (born 1967), South Korean-born American man imprisoned for disclosing classified information to a journalist

=== Sportspeople ===
- Song Jin-woo (born 1966), South Korean baseball player
- Kim Jin-woo (footballer) (born 1975), South Korean football player
- Lee Jin-woo (footballer) (born 1982), South Korean football player
- Hwang Jin-woo (born 1983), South Korean auto racing driver
- Kim Jin-woo (baseball) (born 1983), South Korean baseball player
- Kim Jin-Woo (swimmer) (born 1983), Kenyan swimmer
- Park Jin-woo (volleyball) (born 1990), South Korean volleyball player
- Lim Jin-woo (born 1993), South Korean football player

=== Entertainers ===
- Jung Jin-woo (born 1938), South Korean film director
- Lee Jin-woo (actor) (born 1969), South Korean actor
- Jinu (born Kim Jin-woo, 1971), American rapper, member of music duo Jinusean
- Kim Jin-woo (actor) (born 1983), South Korean actor
- Park Jin-woo (born 1983), South Korean actor
- Kim Jin-woo (musician) (born 1991), South Korean singer, member of boy band Winner
- Jinjin (born Park Jin-woo, 1996), South Korean singer, member of boy band Astro

=== Other ===
- Jung Jin-woo (born 1938), South Korean film director
- Nam Jin-woo (born 1960), South Korean poet
- Cheon Jinwoo (born 1962), South Korean chemist
- Lee Jin-Woo (1994-2026) , a man was center on 2026 Exam scandal.

=== Fictional characters ===
- Sung Jin-woo, a character from Solo Leveling
- Jinu, a character from K-Pop Demon Hunters

== See also ==
- List of Korean given names
