= Yun Humyong =

South Korean writer (1946–2025)

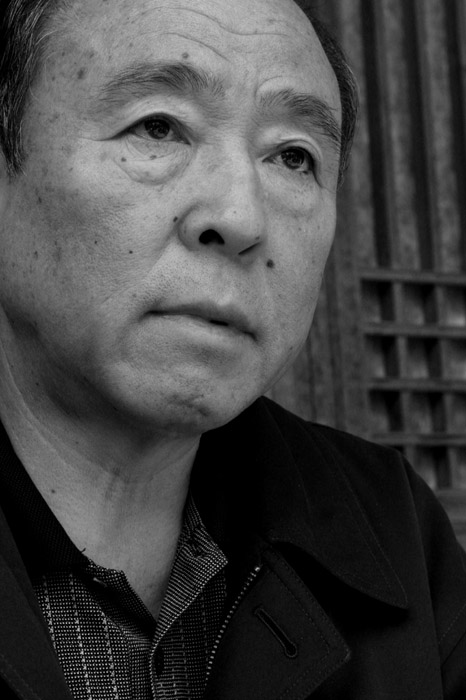
- Born: Yun Sang-gyu; January 17, 1946; Gangneung, Gangwon, US-occupied Korea
- Died: May 8, 2025 (aged 79)
- Education: Yonsei
- Writing career
- Language: Korean

Korean name
- Hangul: 윤상규
- Hanja: 尹尙奎
- RR: Yun Sanggyu
- MR: Yun Sanggyu

Pen name
- Hangul: 윤후명
- Hanja: 尹厚明
- RR: Yun Humyeong
- MR: Yun Humyŏng

Yun Hu-myong (Note: This is the author's preferred Romanization per LTI Korea) (January 17, 1946 – May 8, 2025) was a South Korean writer who published poetry, novels, and essays.

== Background ==
Yun was born in the city of Gangneung in Gangwon, South Korea, under the name Yun Sang-gyu. He received his bachelor's degree in philosophy from Yonsei University.

Yun died on May 8, 2025, at the age of 79.

== Work ==
Although he was one of the major Korean writers of the 1980s, Yun's fiction maintains some distance from the dominant trend in Korean fiction of 1980s—the concern with realism as an effective literary tool in rendering contemporary social situations. Instead, what supports Yun's fictional world are individual desire and the power of fantasy. The archetypal situation in Yun's works is that of a man suffering from a sense of ontological lack; deadened by routines of daily life, he immerses himself in fantasy or travel in order to secure what life in the real world has denied him—meaning of existence and genuine engagement with another human being. Often this search hinges on the protagonist's ardent yearning for a woman. The fantasy cannot last, but it is the ceaseless movement away from the vulgar reality that has the potential to resurrect the self from existential insecurity, loneliness, or despair. Such romantic individualism is heightened by the sensitive, lyrical style of writing that reflects Yun's poetic sensibilities.

Yun's novels deal with the relationship between fantasy and reality in individuals' lives. In a similar fashion, his poetry deals with the connection between the profound and the mundane.

== Books ==
- Expert Archer, poetry, (1977)
- Don Juan's Love, novel, (1983)
- Resurrecting Birds, novel, (1985)
- There Is No Ape, novel, (1989)
- To Stars, novel, (1990)
- You, My Bad Darling, essays, (1990)
- The Generation Without Promise, novel, (약속없는 세대)

== Awards ==
His poems were awarded the Kyonghyang Shinmun Literature prize in 1967, Then in 1979, he was awarded the Hankook Ilbo Literary Award for his short stories in 1979. In the 1980s, he received several awards for his fiction. In 1995, he was awarded the Yi Sang Literary Prize for White Boat. In 2021, he won the Samil Prize.
