= Chochół =

Chochół, Chochoł or Chochol may refer to:

- Chochół, Masovian Voivodeship, village in Poland
- Chochół, Warmian-Masurian Voivodeship, village in Poland
- Josef Chochol, Czech architect
- Chochoł (fictional character)
- Chochoł (mountain), Poland

== See also ==
- Hochul (surname)
- Khokhol, a Russian term for a hairstyle characteristic of Cossacks
