= Jin Eun-young =

South Korean poet and philosopher (born 1970)

Jin Eun-young 진은영
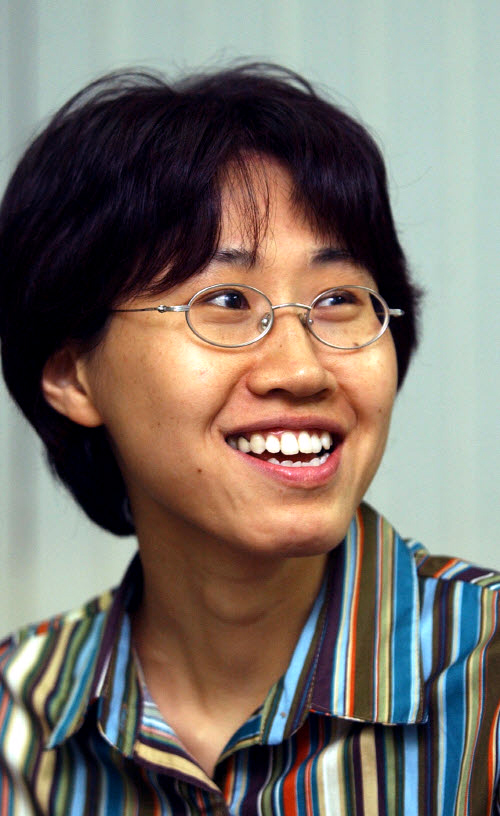
- Occupation: Writer
- Writing career
- Genre: Poetry

Jin Eun-young (the romanization preferred by the author according to LTI Korea) (Hangul 진은영; born 1970) is a South Korean poet and philosopher. She has been praised by the poet Choi Seung-ja, who said "I've finally found a poet whom I can call my true successor."

== Life ==
Jin Eun-young was born in Daejeon, South Korea in 1970. She received her bachelor's, master's, and doctoral degrees in philosophy at Ewha Womans' University. She wrote her doctoral dissertation on Nichewa chaiui cheorak (니체와 차이의 철학 Nietzsche and the Philosophy of Difference). She made her literary debut when "Keodaran changoga itneun jip" (커다란 창고가 있는 집 The House with the Large Shed) and three of her other poems were published in the 2000 Spring issue of Literature and Society. She has three poetry collections published to date: Ilgop gaeui daneoro dwen sajeon (일곱 개의 단어로 된 사전 A Dictionary Made of Seven Words) (2003), Urineun maeilmaeil (우리는 매일매일 Everyday, We) (2008), and Humcheoganeun norae (훔쳐가는 노래 Stealing Away Song) (2012). As a member of Suyu Neomeo, a research community for humanities scholars in South Korea, Jin wrote two philosophy books, namely, Sunsuiseongbipan, iseongeul beopjeonge seuda (순수이성비판, 이성을 법정에 세우다 Critique of Pure Reason: Taking Reason to Court) (2004) and Niche, yeongweonhwegiwa chaieui cheolhak (니체, 영원회귀와 차이의 철학 Nietzsche, Eternal Return and the Philosophy of Difference) (2007). In 2008, her article "Gamgakjeogin geosui bunbae: 2000 nyeondae sie daehayeo" (감각적인 것의 분배: 2000년대 시에 대하여 Distribution of the Sensible: On the Poetry of the 2000s) was published. Referring to Rancière in discussing the relationship between poetry and politics, the article caused a stir in the South Korean literary scene. Jin cited the article years later in her book Munhagui atopos (문학의 아토포스 The Atopos of Literature), which was published in 2014. She has been awarded a number of accolades including the Hyundae Literary Award, Cheon Sang-byeong Poetry Prize, and Daesan Literary Award. She currently teaches at the Korea Counseling Graduate University.

== Writing ==
Jin Eun-young is a poet who is adept at portraying familiar and mundane subjects with a new sensibility. As an artist-cum-philosopher, she recognizes both the romantic and realistic sides of the two professions and expresses them artistically. Her poems tend to be short because she prefers using words simply and sparingly to create a powerful sensory experience, rather than being overly concerned with sending readers a certain message.

Literary critic Lee Gwang-ho remarked on Jin's poetry that it "defies the sentimental conformity of poems written in the 1990s, and is delivered in the hushed whisper and cracking voice of poetic expression that has not yet been institutionalized," referring to how her poetry flies in the face of contemporary sensibilities. She often creates synesthetic metaphors that cannot fall under any one of the five senses. Her metaphors don't try to teach readers the essence of anything; rather, they allow readers to be seized by a curious, fleeting sensation. This is why her poems have been noted for their playful innocence, boundless imagination, and power of uninhibited thought.

While these characteristics are found throughout her work, her third poetry collection Humcheoganeun norae (훔쳐가는 노래 Stealing Away Song) includes a significant number of poems that combine sociological imagination with political poetry. Even before writing this collection, Jin endeavored to find ways to discuss social issues without writing poems that stir up public agitation with blunt criticisms of society. Such efforts resulted in Humcheoganeun norae. In her work, Jin depicts the scars and contradictions of the world through unconventional metaphors.

== Works ==
=== Poetry collections ===
- 《일곱 개의 단어로 된 사전》(문학과지성사, 2003) { Dictionary Made of Seven Words. Moonji, 2003.}
- 《우리는 매일매일》(문학과지성사, 2008) ISBN 978-89-320-1882-9 { Everyday, We. Moonji, 2008. }
- 《훔쳐가는 노래》 (창비, 2012) { Stealing Away Song. Changbi, 2012. }

=== Philosophy books ===
- 《순수이성비판, 이성을 법정에 세우다》(그린비, 2004) { Critique of Pure Reason: Taking Reason to Court. Greenbee, 2004. }
- 《니체, 영원회귀와 차이의 철학》(그린비, 2007) { Nietzsche, Eternal Return and the Philosophy of Difference. Greenbee, 2007. }

=== Literary theory ===
- <문학의 아토포스>(그린비, 2014) { The Atopos of Literature. Greenbee, 2014. }

=== Works in translation ===
- "Long Finger Poem" in Poetry April 2007
- Jin, Eun-young; Jeon, Seung-hee (2012). "Five Poems". Azalea: Journal of Korean Literature & Culture. 5 (1): 269–277. doi:10.1353/aza.2012.0014. S2CID 201793901. Project MUSE 474444.
- Jin, Eun-young; Chung, Eun-Gwi; Brother, Anthony of Taizé (2014). "Long Fingers' Poem, A Dictionary Made of Seven Words, Gogh, Melancholia, Disorderly Stories". Azalea: Journal of Korean Literature & Culture. 7 (1): 277–282. doi:10.1353/aza.2014.0030. S2CID 201770281. Project MUSE 543345.
- Eun-young, Jin; Chung, Eun-Gwi; Anthony of Taizé, Brother (2015). "Extinction, and: I Am, and: Day after Day We, and: When You Were a Boy". Manoa. 27 (2): 10–12. doi:10.1353/man.2015.0069. S2CID 147626507. Project MUSE 607498.
- Des flocons de neige rouge (붉은 눈송이) (French)
- séoul/port-au-prince: revue bilingue (French)

=== Excerpts ===
Spring Has Come

A guy spills a can of green paint.

I don't have red.

I'll have to chop off my wrist.

- Translated by Jeon Seung-hee

I Am

Overcooked spinach, a wet lollipop thrown away, I am a house

rolled by a tapeworm, broken scissors, a gas station selling fake gas,

fish scales scattered across a chopping board, a compass that never

stops spinning, I am a thief who steals rotten fruits, sleep that is long

in coming, a wet hand thrust into a flour sack, the broken crutch of

a one-legged man, the mouth of a yellow balloon, a day when lips

touched, so swollen it split

- Translated by Chung Eun-Gwi and Brother Anthony of Taizé

== Awards ==
- 2009: Kim Daljin Young Poets' Award
- 2010: Hyundae Literary Award
- 2013: Cheon Sang-byeong Poetry Prize
- 2013: Daesan Literary Award (Poetry category)
