= Hucul (surname) =

Hucul is a surname referring to the Hutsuls, an East Slavic group in western Ukraine. Notable people with the surname include:

- Cliff Hucul (born 1948), Canadian racing driver
- Fred Hucul (born 1931), Canadian ice hockey player
- Jenni Hucul (born 1988), Canadian bobsledder
- Sandy Hucul (1933–2022), Canadian ice hockey player and coach

== See also ==
- Hochul (surname)
