= Park Taesun =

South Korean writer (1942–2019)

- Born: May 8, 1942
- Died: August 30, 2019 (aged 77)
- Writing career
- Language: Korean
- Period: 1964-2019

Korean name
- Hangul: 박태순
- Hanja: 朴泰洵
- RR: Bak Taesun
- MR: Pak T'aesun

Park Taesun (Korean: 박태순; May 8, 1942 – August 30, 2019) was a South Korean writer.

== Life ==
Park Taesun was born May 8, 1942, in Sinchon, Hwanghae-do, Korea. Park attended Seoul National University, where he studied English Literature. Park served as the Director of the National Writers' Conference.

Park grew up as part of the “April 19 Generation”, the group of writers who came into prominence in 1960s and whose writing reflects the values associated with the Korean April 19 (1960) Student Revolution.

== Work ==
The Korea Literature Translation Institute wrote of Park:

Park Taesun’s primary themes are customs and habits of thought associated with modern urban life, toward which he maintains a critical viewpoint. His best-known work is a series of short stories set in the slums of Oecheon District on the outskirts of Seoul. The first in the series is “On a Hill in This Beloved Land” (Jeongdeun ttang eondeok wi). Denied economic basis for making a living in the city, but unfamiliar with customs of country life, the people of Oecheon District are borderliners who must struggle to maintain both their material existence and sense of identity. Through their alienation, Park offers unflattering views of rapid urbanization pursued without regard to a sense of balance and reverence for life. Park’s critique of urban culture can also be glimpsed in “The Brothers of Mr. Dan” (Danssiui hyeongjedeul, 1975). The work reveals how city life erodes the spirit of hospitality and human compassion until the only sense of community to be had at all becomes confined to one’s nuclear family. What makes Park Taesun’s gloomy sketches of economically disempowered lives so appealing, however, is the recognition of individuals’ fortitude in overcoming adversity. With an ear for colloquialisms and local patterns of speech, Park sketches people on the margins of society in a heartwarming and sympathetic way.

In “Night on Bald Mountain” (Beolgeosungi sanui harutbam, 1977), Park moves from mere depictions of the powerlessness of the urban poor to advocation of social responsibility. He develops this view further in A Historian’s Youth (Eoneu sahakdoui jeolmeun sijeol), which was serialized in the journal This Generation (Sedae) from 1977 to 1978. A detailed portrait of life and manners of Korean society in the first half of the 1950s, the novel features three main characters who respectively embody the principle of action, experience, and culture. Each dreams of his own utopia, but they come to forge a sense of common destiny through open-minded interactions with one another. The work thus suggests that solidarity may be achieved not only between intellectuals of differing temperaments and views, but between intellectuals and working class people.

Park also translated foreign literature into Korean including the poems of Langston Hughes’ poems, Fast's Conceived in Liberty, Erich Segal's Oliver's Story, and a collection of Palestinian poetry. He also wrote a volume of travel essays entitled The Land and the People (Gukto wa minjung).

== Works in Korean (Partial) ==
- Falling in Love (Yeonae, 1966)
- Three-Horse Wagon (Samdu macha, 1968)
- Theater in Ruins (Muneojin geukjang, 1968)
- Half Moon in Daylight (Naje naon bandal, 1969)
- The Dictator's Wife (Dokjaejaui anae, 1970)
- An Outing (Eotteon oechul, 1971)
- Incontinence (Silgeum, 1977)
- Words Left Unspoken in the Heart (Gaseum soge namainneun micheo haji mothan mal, 1977)
- The Wind That Blew Yesterday (Eoje buldeon baram, 1979
- Jeongseon arirang (1974)
- The Land and the People (Gukto wa minjung - A book of travel essays)

== Awards ==
- Hankook Ilbo Literary Award (1966)
- Yeo-San Literary Award (1998)
