= Hochuli =

Hochuli is a Swiss German surname. Notable people with the surname include:

- Ed Hochuli (born 1950), American attorney and football referee
- Jost Hochuli (born 1933), Swiss graphic designer
- Shawn Hochuli (born 1978), American football referee

== See also ==
- Hochul (surname)
