= Lee Yun-gi =

South Korean writer and translator

- Writing career
- Language: Korean

Korean name
- Hangul: 이윤기
- Hanja: 李潤基
- RR: I Yungi
- MR: I Yun'gi

Lee Yun-gi (Korean: 이윤기, May 3, 1947 – August 27, 2010) is a prize-winning modern South Korean writer and translator.

== Life ==
Lee Yun-gi was born in North Gyeongsang Province, southern Korea, on May 5, 1947. Although Lee Yun-gi (1947- ) made his official literary debut in 1977 and published his first collection of short stories, White Helicopter in 1988, it was not until the mid-1990s that he gained recognition as a fiction writer. For the first twenty years of his career, Lee was better known as a prolific translator and by the time his first novel, The Gates of Heaven, appeared in 1994, he had translated and published over 150 works including Umberto Eco's The Name of the Rose and Foucault's Pendulum.

== Work ==
Lee Yun-gi utilizes his knowledge of mythology to build narratives rich in symbols and metaphors. His background in translating, which requires attention to the exact meaning of each word, gives his language precision and accuracy. His writing contains a great deal of dialogue. Although Korean writers tend to focus more on descriptions than dialogues, Lee Yun-gi relies much on dialogues to drive his narrative forward. His dialogues are pithy but meaningful and so dynamic that the readers often imagine themselves listening to a real conversation.

In his works, Lee focuses on understanding various forms of life through communication with others and thereby embraces life. Lee's attitude toward life is marked by a sense of generosity and optimism. He does not complain about life's cruelties, become frustrated by hardships or despair over the baseness of human nature. Rather than exposing the problems in life, he concentrates on resolving them through his work. Lee often uses aphorisms—old ones reshaped or new ones penned by the author and strategically placed throughout the text—that attempt to express a certain universal truth about life. Another characteristic of Lee's fiction is humor and wit. The comedy of a given situation is brought to life through the author's multi-layered style of writing that initially delays understanding and then allows his characters an epiphanic moment later on. Lee draws freely from his knowledge of both eastern and western history, mythologies and culture.

In 1998 Lee won the Dong-in Literature Prize and in 2008 he won the Daesan Literature Award and the Korean Translation Award.

== Works in Korean (Partial) ==
Short Story Collections

- White Helicopter (Hayan hellikopteo) (1977), Seeing One Road,
- Seeing Two Roads (Oegil bogi, dugil bogi)
- Butterfly Necktie (Nabi nektai) (1995)

Novels

- Gate to Heaven (Haneurui mun) (1994)
- Sunlight and Moonlight (Haetbitgwa dalbit)(1996)
- An Offspring of Love (Sarangui jongja)
- House Where Trees Pray (Namuga gidohaneun jip)(1999)

Essay Collections

- School for Adults (Eoreunui hakgyo)
- Rainbow and Prism (Mujigaewa peuriseum)

Translations

- The Name of the Rose (Jangmiui ireum)
- Foucault's Pendulum (Pukoui jinja),
- The Island of the Day Before (Jeonnarui seom) by Umberto Eco
- Shamanism (Shamaniseum) by Mircen Eliade
- Metamorphoses (Byeonsin iyagi) by Ovid
- Men and Symbols (Ingangwa sangjing) by Carl Jung

== Awards ==
- Dong-in Literary Award (1998)
- Daesan Literary Awards (2008)
- Korean Translation Award (2008)
