= Hyun Ki-young =

South Korean writer

Hyun Ki-Young
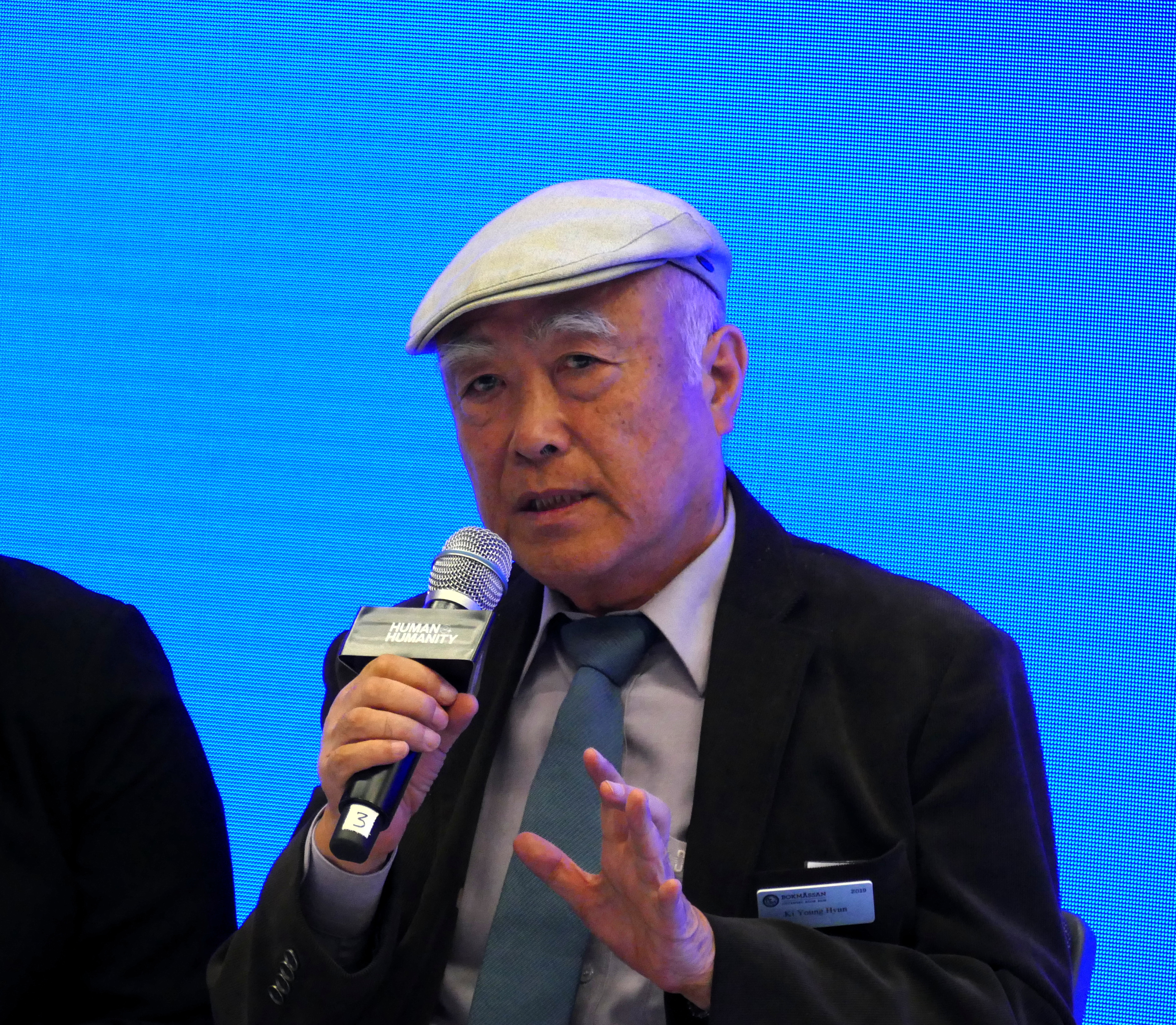
- Hyun in 2019
- Born: 16 January 1941 (age 85); Jeju Island, Korea, Empire of Japan
- Education: Seoul National University
- Occupation: Novelist
- Spouse: Yang Jeong-ja
- Writing career
- Language: Korean
- Years active: 1975–present
- Subject: Modern history of Jeju
- Notable work: Suni Samchon
- Notable awards: Manhae Prize 1990; Daesan Literary Awards 2023

Korean name
- Hangul: 현기영
- Hanja: 玄基榮
- RR: Hyeon Giyeong
- MR: Hyŏn Kiyŏng

Hyun Ki-young (Korean: 현기영; born 16 January 1941) is a South Korean writer whose works focus on the modern history of Jeju Island. He is best known for his 1978 work Suni Samchon, the first novel on the Jeju uprising, and his activism to spread awareness of the incident. He won multiple literary awards such as the Manhae Prize and Daesan Literary Awards.

== Early life and education ==
Hyun Ki-Young was born in Jeju Island, Korea, Empire of Japan on 16 January 1941. He recalled that he spent his childhood without his father as he was away on the mainland. He wrote novels influenced by Kim Dongni and Hwang Sun-won and won first prize at the Jeju Student Literary Contest in his first year of Ohyun Middle School. From his second year at Ohyun High School, he worked as a private tutor to save money for college tuition, but his father took the money. He went to college 1 year later than his peers as his family was poor. He studied English education at Seoul National University and taught at Seoul National University Middle School and Kwangshin Middle School for 20 years. In 1987, he quit his teaching job to become a full-time writer.

=== Impact of Jeju Uprising ===
The Jeju uprising (called Jeju 4·3 incident in South Korea) was an armed uprising by the Workers' Party of South Korea on 3 April 1948, followed by indiscriminate violence against Jeju residents by the military until the spring of 1949. The death toll of civilians is estimated to be 25,000–30,000 and more than 95% of the villages in mountainous areas were burnt down. 560 people died in Nohyeong Village, Hyun's hometown. Although he did not suffer directly from the incident as he was living in another village at that time, he heard that his relatives had died in the turmoil. In a 2019 interview, he stated that the incident traumatized him and made him stutter. Thus, writing novels about it was a way to overcome his trauma.

== Career ==
Hyun's works focus on the history of Jeju Island and its residents. He debuted in 1975 when his short story "Father" (아버지), which depicts the coming-of-age of a fatherless boy, won The Dong-A Ilbo New Writer's Contest. In 1978, he wrote "Suni Samchon" (순이 삼촌; Aunt Suni), the first novel to address the Jeju uprising, in the fall issue of The Quarterly Changbi. It depicts the protagonist’s investigation into his aunt’s death, who died by suicide after losing her children in the incident and thus suffering from mental illness. The following year, he wrote a short story collection titled Suni Samchon, which also included other short stories such as "The Crow of Doryeongmaru" (도령마루의 까마귀) and "The Story of the Sea Dragon" (해룡 이야기). However, the Park Chung Hee and Chun Doo-hwan government silenced all discussion of the massacre to preserve the legitimacy of state violence. As a result, in 1980, he was taken into custody by the Defense Security Command, tortured for three days, and imprisoned for a month. The book was banned for 14 years. Meanwhile, in 2025, it was designated as a Memory of the World as a part of Revealing Truth: Jeju 4·3 Archives.

In 1983, he wrote the novel A Bird Crying in the Periphery (변방에 우짖는 새) which depicts the Rebellion of Bang Seong-chil in 1898 and the Rebellion of Lee Jae-su in 1901. In 1986, he wrote the short story collection Asphalt (아스팔트) where the protagonists overcome resentment as those responsible for their families’ suffering during the Jeju uprising approach death. In 1989, he wrote the novel Windy Island (바람 타는 섬) which depicts the 1930s Jeju haenyeo anti-Japanese resistance movement. In 1990, he won the Manhae Prize for his work.

In 1991, he wrote the novel Man in Crisis (위기의 사내) which depicts the struggles of a middle-aged teacher during the 1980s democracy movement. In 1994, he wrote the novel The Last Shepherd (마지막 테우리) which intertwines Jeju’s past with its present where its grasslands are being destroyed by the construction of golf courses. In the same year, he won the Oh Yeong-su Literary Award for the work. In 1999, he wrote One Spoon on This Earth (지상에 숟가락 하나), a novel based on his life. In the same year, he won the Hankook Ilbo Literary Award for the work. However, in 2008, the novel was included on the "subversive books list" of the Ministry of National Defense.

From 2001 to 2003, he served as the chairman of the Writers Association of Korea. In 2003, he was appointed as the president of the Korea Arts & Culture Education Service. In 2009, he wrote the novel Nuran (누란) which depicts the life of an intellectual who was at the forefront of the 1980s democracy movement.

In 2019, he was awarded the Eungwan Order of Cultural Merit. In 2023, he wrote the three-volume novel Oh, Jejudo (제주도우다) which depicts the life of a teenage boy from 1943 to 1948. In the same year, he won the Daesan Literary Awards for the work.

=== Activism on Jeju Uprising ===
Hyun served as the director of the Jeju 4·3 Research Institute, president of the Jeju Council for Social Issues, and head of the commemorative committees for the 50th, 60th, and 70th anniversaries of the incident. In 2019, he won the Jeju 4·3 Peace Prize for writing Suni Samchon.

== Personal life ==
He married Yang Jeong-ja, a poet and fellow student of the Department of English Education at Seoul National University.

== Notable works ==
- Suni Samchon (순이 삼촌, 1979)
- A Bird Crying in the Periphery (변방에 우짖는 새, 1983)
- Asphalt (아스팔트, 1986)
- Windy Island (바람 타는 섬, 1989)
- Man in Crisis (위기의 사내, 1991)
- The Last Shepherd (마지막 테우리, 1994)
- One Spoon on This Earth (지상에 숟가락 하나, 1999)
- Nuran (누란, 2009)
- Oh, Jejudo (제주도우다, 2023)

=== English translations ===
- Aunt Suni (2008) translated by Song Jong-do
- Suni Samchon (2012) translated by Lee Jung-hi
- One Spoon on This Earth (2013) translated by Jennifer Lee

== Awards ==
- 1986 Shin Dong-yeop Literary Award - Windy Island
- 1990 Manhae Prize - Windy Island
- 1994 Oh Yeong-su Literary Award - The Last Shepherd
- 1999 Hankook Ilbo Literary Award - One Spoon on This Earth
- 2019 Jeju 4·3 Peace Prize
- 2019 Eungwan Order of Cultural Merit
- 2023 Daesan Literary Awards - Oh, Jejudo
- 2025 Lee Hochul Literary Prize for Peace

== TV appearance ==
- 2018 Differential Class
