= Choi Seung-ja =

South Korean poet

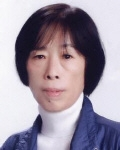
- Born: 1952 (age 73–74); Yeongi County, South Korea
- Education: Korea University
- Occupation: Writer
- Writing career
- Genre: Poetry

Choi Seung-ja (Korean: 최승자; born 1952) is a South Korean poet. Her poetry expresses the melancholy of a person facing death. Some critics have described her work as "the moans of pain by someone who has not been loved" (Kim Hyeon) or as "perceiving a world full of lives that have lost their roots . . . and accepting that the loss of one's roots is a human condition" (Jeong Gwa-ri). Another critic has noted that her poems are "driven by a solitary ego that shuts itself away from a world poisoned by capitalism and resists that world through the language of defiance" (Lee Gwang-ho).

== Biography ==
Choi Seung-ja was born in Yeongi County, South Korea in 1952. She attended high school in Seoul and studied German language and literature at Korea University. She was the editor-in-chief for her school magazine until she was blacklisted for reasons unknown during the Fourth Republic. She was subsequently expelled before she could finish her degree. Following her expulsion, she joined the editing team at a publisher called Hongsungsa, where an alumnus was editor-in-chief. She made her literary debut in 1979 when the journal Literature and Intelligence published five of her poems including "Love of This Age" (이 시대의 사랑). She left Hongsungsa after her debut and devoted herself full-time to writing and translation. In 1993, she participated in the International Writing Program at the University of Iowa. She wrote very little during the 1990s, with Yeonindeul (연인들 Lovers), a 1999 collection of forty poems, being one of her few publications. Her 2010 poetry collection Sseulsseulhaeseo meonameon (쓸쓸해서 머나먼 Lonely and Faraway) marked a new beginning in her writing career. In 2010, she won the Jirisan Literature Prize and Daesan Literary Award. In 2017, her poems were published in The Guardian. She has translated Also sprach Zarathustra: Ein Buch für Alle und Keinen (Thus Spoke Zarathustra), Die Welt des Schweigens (The World of Silence), The Art of Hunger, and The Secret Language of Symbols into Korean.

== Writing ==
Choi Seung-ja was one of the most lauded South Korean poets in the 1980s. She portrayed objects, lives, eras, and events using metaphors of the body. Such writing was rooted in self-denial and self-hatred, which she expressed in the form of hostility toward the world. Choi's poetry took on a rebellious character partly in response to the oppression of her gender in a male-dominated society, and partly to the Yusin government of the 1970s and the military dictatorship of the 1980s in South Korea. Her poetry was a scathing testimony of a Dark Age and is still widely read today.

Choi's first poetry collection Ishidaeui sarang (이 시대의 사랑 Love of This Age), published in 1981, investigates the underlying truth of all objects to find meaning in a life destroyed by society. In her next works—Jeulgeoun ilgi (즐거운 일기 Merry Diary; 1984), Gieogui jip (기억의 집 House of Memory; 1989), and Nae mudeom, pureugo (내 무덤, 푸르고 My Tomb, Grave; 1993)—Choi continues to reject the world around her and refuses to compromise. Believing that the fundamental meaning of life is lost, she regards life with despair and denial. She describes herself as "a descendant of darkness, a hypnotized body" or as the "priestess of emptiness." Sometimes such sentiments lead to intense masochism, as seen in verses like "Oh I want to be a dog beaten to death / I want to be a carpet made from the skin of a dog beaten to death."

Choi's poetry has grown less fierce and brutal in the 2010s after her hiatus. Her recent works focus on the ennui of life instead. Nevertheless, they still demonstrate an acute awareness of life and the world.

== Works ==
- <이 시대의 사랑>, 문학과 지성사, 1981 { Love of This Age. Moonji, 1981. }
- <즐거운 일기>, 문학과 지성사, 1984 { Merry Diary. Moonji, 1984. }
- <기억의 집>, 문학과 지성사, 1989 { House of Memory. Moonji, 1989. }
- <내 무덤, 푸르고>, 문학과 지성사, 1993 { My Tomb, Green. Moonji, 1993. }
- <연인들>, 문학동네, 1999 { Lovers. Munhakdongne, 1999. }
- <쓸쓸해서 머나먼>, 문학과 지성사, 2010 { Lonely and Faraway. Moonji, 2010. }
- <물 위에 씌어진>, 천년의 시작, 2011 { Written on the Water. Poem Sijak, 2011. }
- <빈 배처럼 텅 비어>, 문학과 지성사, 2016 { Empty as a Deserted Boat. Moonji, 2016. }

=== Works in translation ===
- Portrait of a Suburbanite: Poems of Choi Seung-ja (2015)
- Anxiety of words: contemporary poetry by Korean women (2006)
- The Guardian Translation Tuesday: Three poems by Choi Seung-ja
- "For the Second Time in Thirty-Three Years" in Korean Literature Now Summer 2016
- "From Early on, I," "Autumn Like a Dog," "I Remember," "On a Faraway Sea," "A Child," and "A Time Existed" in Korea Poetry in Translation English
- El Tiempo Transparente (1996)

== Awards ==
- 2010: Jirisan Literature Prize
- 2010: Daesan Literary Award
