= Son Bo-mi =

South Korean writer

- Born: 1980 (age 45–46)
- Writing career
- Language: Korean
- Period: Modern

Korean name
- Hangul: 손보미
- RR: Son Bomi
- MR: Son Pomi

Son Bo-mi is a South Korean writer of fiction born in Seoul.

== Life ==
Son was born in Seoul, South Korea. Son made her literary debut int 2009 with Silence and she currently teaches creative writings at Kyeonghee University. She is married to writer Kim Jong-ok.

== Work ==
Son is known for writing extremely emotional works (Blanket, Hot Air Balloon, and I'm Leaving Too, Liz) in very dry and calm sentences that paradoxically seem to reveal more feeling through their aridity than they would through overt emotionalism. Her stories often feature elaborate narrative structures that often leave out key ingredients related to the plot. This is partially because many of her works are interrelated and events that have happened in one book are often expected to be known about in the other books, even if they are only referred to most elliptically.

Her important works included Downpour, A Love of Scientist, Stroll, and Lindy Hop For Them. Downpour has been partially translated online, as it was one of her award-winning works.

== Awards ==
- 2014 5th Annual Young Artists Award
- 2014 21st Kim Joon-Sung Prize
- 2013 The 46th Hankook Ilbo Literary Award
- 2012 The 3rd annual literary neighborhood young artist award
- 2011 Dong-A Ilbo Short Story Award
- 2009 21st century Literary short story Division Newcomer Award

== Works in English ==
- Hot Air Balloon (Asia Publishers, 2014)
- Swell (Two Lines Press, 2026)

== Works in Korean ==
- 우연의 신 The Goddess of Chance 2019
- 우아한 밤과 고양이들 One Graceful night and cats 2018
- 디어 랄프 로렌 Dear Ralph Lauren 2017
- 애드벌룬 Hot Air balloon 2014
- 제5회 젊은작가상 수상작품집
- 그들에게 린디합을 Lindi Hab for them 2013
- 제4회 젊은작가상 수상작품집
- 소설 작법 How to Write A Story
- 제3회 젊은작가상 수상작품집
- 젊은 소설 Young Stories
