= Kim Jong-ok =

South Korean writer (born 1973)

Kim Jong-ok (Korean: 김종옥; born 1973) is a South Korean writer. He began his literary career when his short story "Georiui masulsa" (거리의 마술사; The Street Magician) won the 2012 Munhwa Ilbo New Writer's Contest. For the same short story he was also awarded Munhakdongne Young Writers' Award Grand Prize.

== Life ==
Kim Jong-ok was born in Seoul in 1973. He graduated in Korean Literature from Kyung Hee University. He married Son Bo-mi, a fellow writer who graduated from the same department at the same university 7 years his junior.

== Writing ==
Kim's debut work "Georiui masulsa" (거리의 마술사 The Street Magician) deals with bullying.

As his works put emphasis on memory, Kim Jong-ok's stories are mostly narrated through the perspective of reminiscence. His book, Gwacheon, uriga haji aneun il (과천, 우리가 하지 않은 일 Gwacheon, Something We Haven't Done), contains many stories of failed romance that are belatedly reminisced.

== Works ==
- Gwacheon, uriga haji aneun il (과천, 우리가 하지 않은 일 Gwacheon, Something We Haven't Done), 2015
- Simba the King Lion, 1995

== Awards ==
- Munhakdongne Young Writers' Award Grand Prize, 2015.
