= Kyung Hee University =

Private university in Seoul, South Korea

Coordinates: 37°35′48.3″N 127°3′6.8″E

- Motto: "학원의 민주화, 사상의 민주화, 생활의 민주화"
- Motto in English: "Democratization of school, democratization of thought, democratization of living"
- Type: Private
- Established: 1911; 115 years ago started as Shin Heung Military Academy
- Affiliations: AALAU
- President: Kim Jinsang (김진상)
- Academic staff: 1,395 (2025)
- Administrative staff: 1,170 (2025)
- Students: 34,342 (2025)
- Undergraduates: 25,573 (2025)
- Postgraduates: 8,769 (2025)
- Location: Seoul and Suwon, South Korea
- Campus: Urban
- Language: Korean and English
- Colors: Crimson
- Mascot: Laughing Lion
- Website: khu.ac.kr (in Korean) khu.ac.kr/eng (in English)

Korean name
- Hangul: 경희대학교
- Hanja: 慶熙大學校
- RR: Gyeonghui daehakgyo
- MR: Kyŏnghŭi taehakkyo

Kyung Hee University (KHU; Korean: 경희대학교) is a private research university in South Korea with campuses in Seoul and Suwon. It was founded in 1949. Kyung Hee University is part of the Kyung Hee University System, which offers comprehensive education from kindergarten through graduate school.

As of 2020, about 33,000 students were enrolled in Kyung Hee University. The university consists of 24 undergraduate colleges, 1 general graduate school, 13 specialty graduate schools, and 49 auxiliary research institutions. The university offers a study abroad program in partnership with 434 sister universities in 69 countries.

Kyung Hee University is known for its College of Korean Medicine, which is considered a leading school in traditional Korean medicine and other traditional East Asian medical practices.

== History ==
Kyung Hee University began in 1949 as Sin Heung Junior College, a 2-year college. It was named for the 1911–1920 Sinhŭng Military Academy, which trained militant Korean independence activists. Amid the financial crisis of the Korean War, Young Seek Choue bought the struggling school in 1951 and had it accredited as a 4-year undergraduate college in 1952. In 1954, the graduate school was established. The college was renamed to Kyung Hee University in 1960.

The university hosted the 1968 conference of the International Association of University Presidents, first proposed in 1981 the UN International Day of Peace, organized the 1999 Seoul International Conference of NGOs, held the 2009 World Civic Forum, ran the 2011 UNAI-Kyung Hee International Symposium, and has spearheaded the Global Common Society movement.

In 1993 Kyung Hee received the UNESCO Prize for Peace Education. In 2006, Kyung Hee and the University of Pennsylvania initiated the Penn-Kyung Hee Collaborative Summer Program and two years later, a formal Global Collaborative with Peking, Ritsumeikan, and Moscow State universities, with the cooperation of the United Nations Department of Economic and Social Affairs, and the Conference of NGOs (CoNGO).

== Symbols ==
The university emblem is the Chinese character for "university" (it was changed in 2016 to the symbol of a book) and has a world map in the background. This symbolizes Kyung Hee's vision for globalization as well as an open mind and humanism for the world. The university character mark is visualized through the mane of the Laughing Lion, the torch which sheds light on the truth, and the dove, an international symbol of peace. Sports teams and various university promotional products use the character mark to proliferate Kyung Hee's brand value throughout the world. Magnolia is the official flower of Kyung Hee University and the magnolia logo embodies the qualities that Kyung Hee stands for such as resilience, beauty, generosity, and unity.

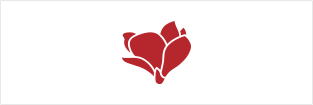
University flower, the magnolia

== Academics ==
=== Undergraduate colleges ===
- College of Humanities
- College of Law
- College of Politics and Economics
- College of Management
- College of Hotel and Tourism Management
- College of Science
- College of Human Ecology
- College of Medicine
- College of Korean Medicine
- College of Dentistry
- College of Pharmacy
- College of Nursing Science
- College of Music
- College of Fine Arts
- School of Dance
- Department of Global Eminence (formerly College of Law)
- College of Engineering
- College of Electronics & Information
- College of Software
- College of Applied Sciences
- College of Life Sciences
- College of International Studies
- College of Foreign Language and Literature
- College of Art & Design
- College of Physical Education
- The School of East-West Medical Science

=== Graduate schools ===
- Graduate School (general)
- Graduate School of Business
- Graduate School of Education
- Graduate School of Public Policy and Civic Engagement
- Graduate School of Journalism and Communication
- Graduate School of Physical Education
- Graduate School of Technology Management
- Graduate School of International Legal Affairs
- Graduate School of Pan-Pacific International Studies
- Graduate School of East-West Medical Science
- Graduate Institute of Peace Studies
- Graduate School of Tourism
- Graduate School of Art and Fusion Design
- Professional Graduate School of Medicine
- Professional Graduate School of Dentistry
- Law School
- Graduate School of Biotechnology

=== Notable academic programs ===
==== Traditional Korean medicine ====
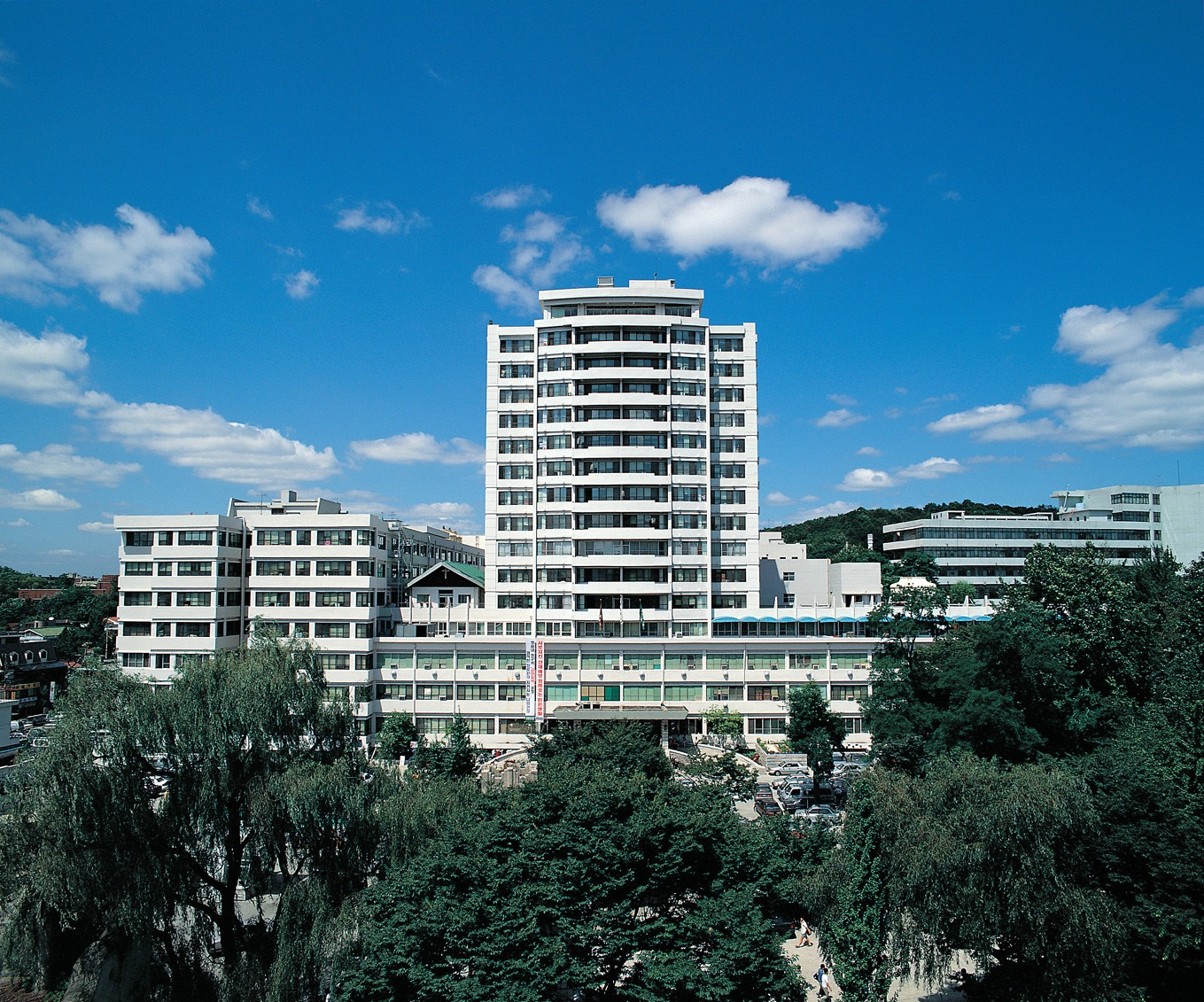
Kyung Hee Medical Center

Founded in 1948 as Dongyang College and reorganized in 1965 into the Kyung Hee College of Korean Medicine (KHKM), KHKM is one of eleven Korean medical colleges in the country, dedicated to the study of traditional medical practice. In 1972 its researchers demonstrated a drug-free acupunctural anesthesia. In 1998 Kyung Hee established the International Studies of Korean Medicine to broaden its reach to international scholars. The following year it established the Graduate School of East-West Medicine Science (GSM) in order to blend Eastern and Western diagnostic methods. The College of Korean Medicine and the Graduate School of Medicine have integrated the two traditions within the Kyung Hee Medical Center and active collaboration occurs between the college and the biomedical engineering department on acupuncture therapy, chronic medical conditions, palsy, and geriatric diseases.

The medical center is divided into the General Hospital, Dental Hospital, Korean Medicine Hospital, East-West Medical Center, and the Medical Science Research Institute. In a 1999 study, the Kyung Hee Korean medicine curriculum consisted of 60 percent Eastern and 40 percent Western research and practice.

==== Physical education ====
The Dept. of Physical Education at KHU was set up as the Dept. of Physical Education in Korea in 1949 and became a stepping stone to play a pivotal role in Korean Physical education. It was promoted to the College of Physical Education upon completing the construction of the largest gym in Asia in 1955. The doctoral program was opened in 1980 for the first time in Korea. Currently, five departments are operated within the College of Physical Education: Physical Edu, Sports medicine, coaching, Golf Management, and Taekwondo.

== Campus ==
Kyung Hee University has three campuses. The university's original campus is Seoul Campus (245 acres), located in the Dongdaemun District of Seoul, and established in 1954. In 1979, the university established its second campus, the Global Campus (510 acres) in Yongin, near Suwon. In 1984, the university established its third campus, Gwangneung Campus (12 acres) in Namyangju, just outside of Seoul. Gwangneung Campus is home to the Graduate Institute of Peace Studies.

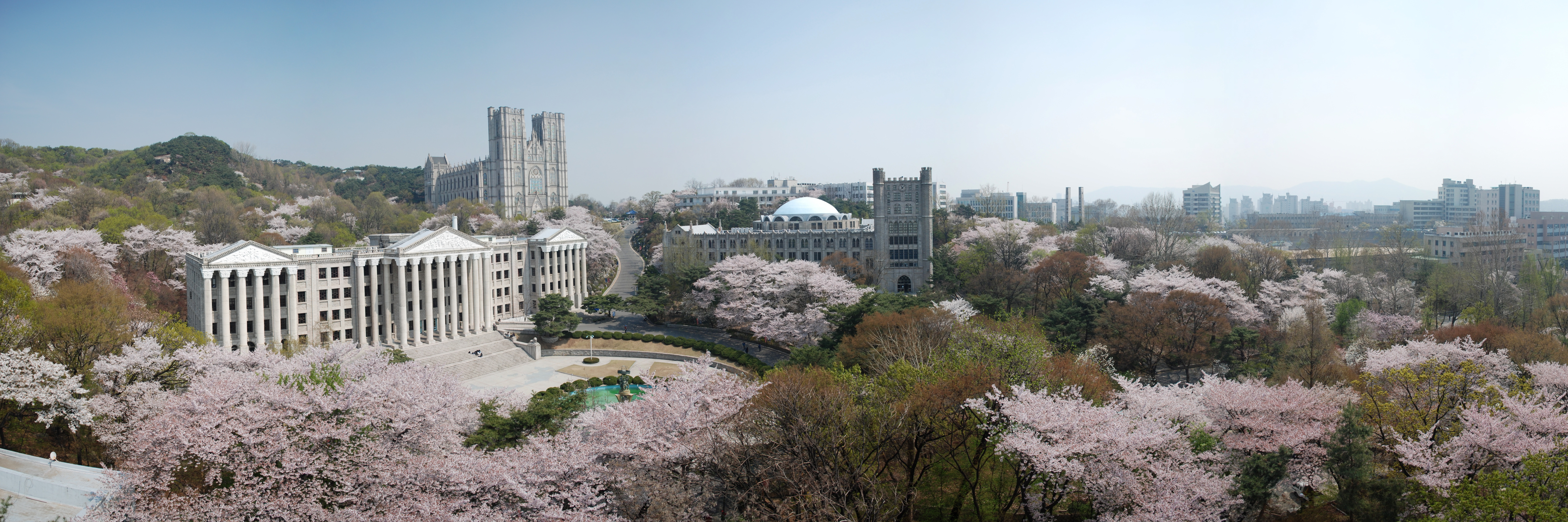
Kyung Hee University Seoul Campus

== Facilities ==
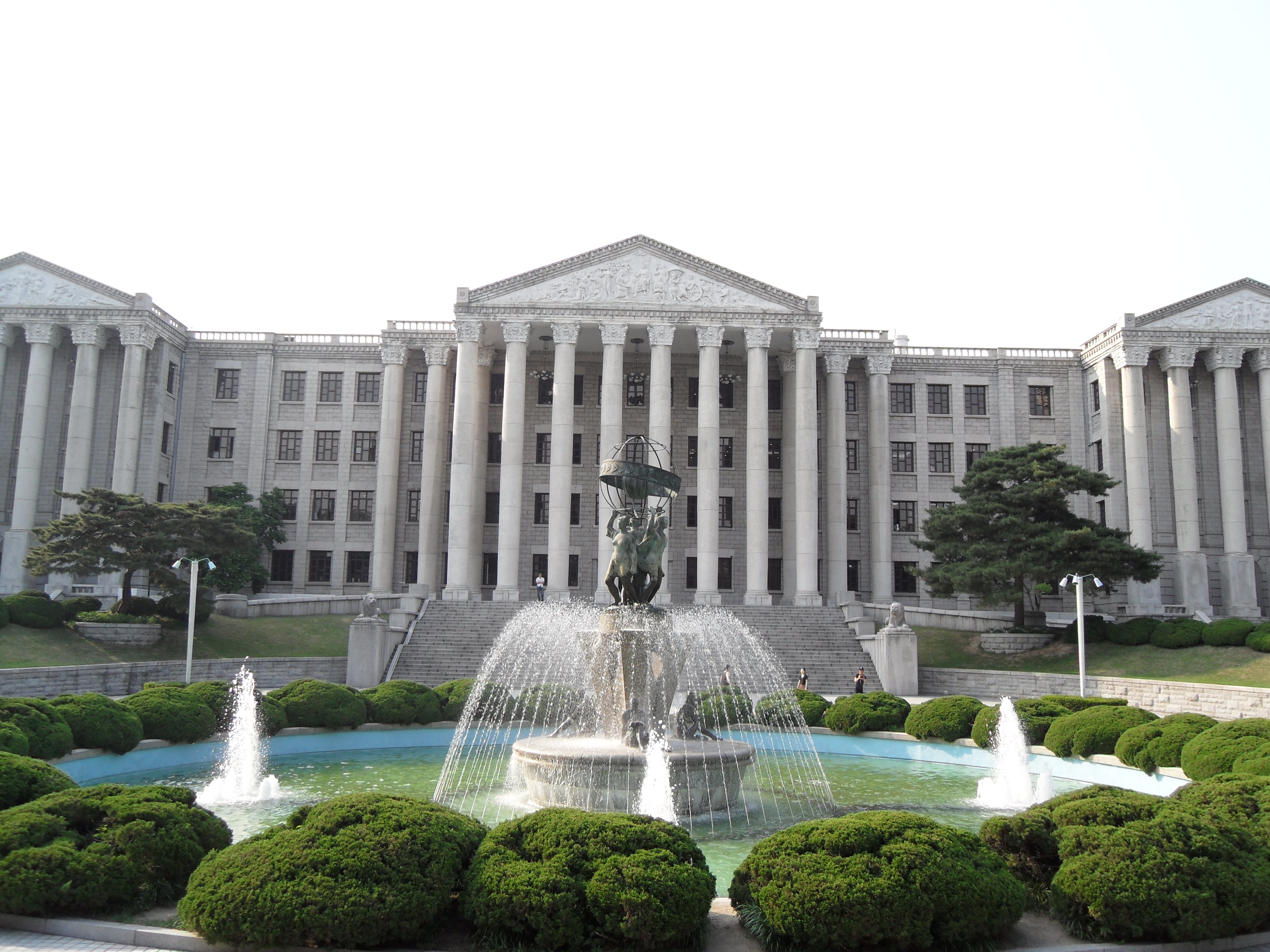
Administration Building (Seoul campus)

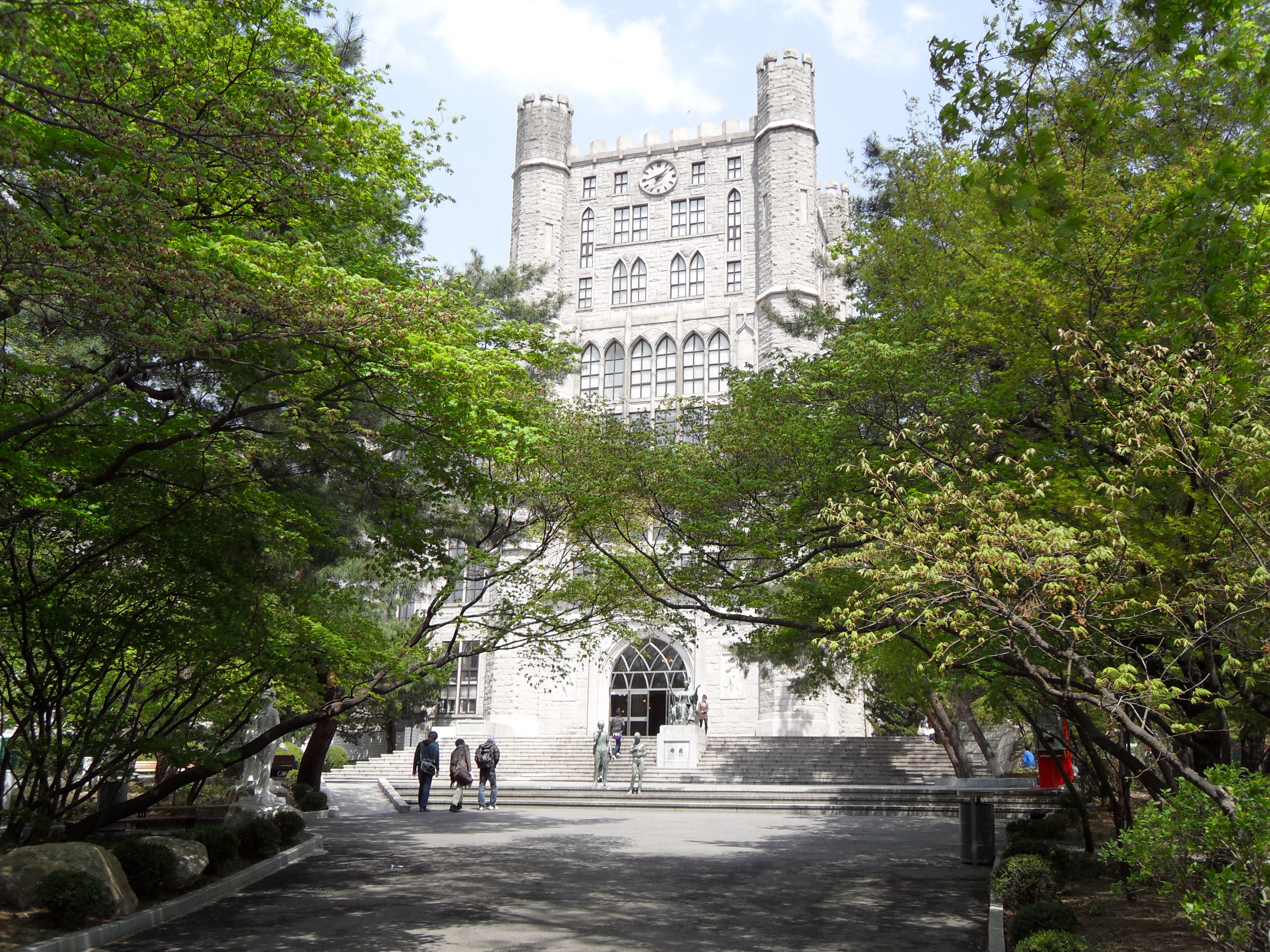
Central Library and Museum (Seoul campus)

=== Central Museum ===
It was opened in October 1955 and later moved to the fourth floor of the central library building in November 1966 when the central library was completed. In 2001, it was registered as the 1st National Museum of Korea (Ministry of Culture and Tourism Registration No. 193) and then recommissioned and computerized the collections and launched the Internet search service in January 2004.

=== Natural History Museum ===
Kyung Hee University's Natural History Museum is a museum established and operated by Kyung Hee University. It opened on June 13, 1978, and houses some 90,000 specimens and natural materials such as rocks, minerals, mammals, birds, insects, fish, and plants. Each category includes 1,200 rock and mineral samples, 5,000 bird and mammal samples, 50,000 insect specimens, and 4,000 plant specimens.

=== Hye Jung Museum ===
The Hye Jung Museum is the first high-level museum to be established in Korea. From the 11th century to the 20th century, it has the largest collection of materials produced in Korea, including antique maps, lighting, and related historical materials.

== Programs ==
=== Global Collaborative ===
The Global Collaborative is a summer program that allows international students to attend classes led by scholars and engage in discussions about global governance and sustainability. The Global Collaborative is co-run by the University of Pennsylvania, Peking University, Ritsumeikan University, and Moscow State University with the cooperation of the United Nations and the Conference of NGOs (CoNGO). Through research, education and modules on global governance, or sustainability and the environment, international students collaborate on research projects.

=== World Civic Forum ===
Run as a join initiative with the United Nations Department of Economic and Social Affairs, the World Civic Forum (WCF) is a global institution that brings together academic institutions, international organizations, civil society, governments, the business sector and the media to create programs in education, research, and practice related to the challenges of making the world a better place to live. Held concurrently with the World Civic Forum, the World Civic Youth Forum focuses youth on contemporary global issues, civic values, engagement, and action.

=== Global Service Corps ===
The Global Service Corps emphasizes peace studies in new forms of public service. Launched in September 2010, the effort is placed on volunteering, social responsibility, social services, and regional and global engagement in areas such as rural farming communities, environment protection, and medical treatment of the disadvantaged. The program aims to seek means to address institutional engagement in global problems through research, education and practice, and media. Collaborations are with the United Nations, international NGOs, corporations, and other organizations.

=== Global Studio Network ===
The Global Student Network links by the internet diverse institutes and individuals around the world to overcome communication beyond barriers of language and culture. The network works with both local and international organizations to encourage discussion. Previous strands have included environmental issues and conflict resolution with the United Nations and UNESCO.

=== Global Academy for Future Civilizations ===
The Global Academy for Future Civilizations is a set of international research organizations dedicated to creating a more humane civilization in the 21st century. The program works with the United Nations and other organizations.

=== United Nations Academic Impact ===
The university and the United Nations Academic Impact program seek to align institutions of higher education with the United Nations in supporting the principles of the UN in the areas of human rights, literacy, sustainability and conflict resolution. The Academic Impact also asks each participating college or university to demonstrate support of at least one of those principles each year.

== Research institutes ==
=== Seoul campus ===
- International Studies of Korean Medicine
- Institute for Human Society
- Institute of Korean Archaeology and Ancient History
- Research Institute of Social Science
- Research Institute of Humanities
- Research Institute for Educational Affairs
- Institute of Legal Studies
- Institute for Industrial Relations
- Korea Institute of Ornithology
- East-West Medical Research Institute
- Research Institute of Oral Biology
- Institute of Global Environment
- Institute of Korean Medicine
- East-West Nursing Research Institute
- The Contemporary Art Research Institute
- Kohwang Medical Research Institute
- Research Institute of Science for Human Life
- Center for the Study of Languages
- East-West Pharmaceutical Research Institute
- Research Institute of Clinical Nutrition
- Tourism Industry Information Research Center
- Testing and Development Center for Dental Material
- Advanced Display Research Center
- Center for Arts and Cultural Management
- International Center of Speech and Debate
- Healthcare Industry Research Institute
- Age-Related and Brain Diseases Research Center
- Acupuncture and Meridian Science Research Center
- Impedance Imaging Research Center (IIRC)

=== Global campus ===
- Institute of Global Affairs
- Center for Cross Culture Studies
- Institute of Social Science and Policy
- Design Research Institute
- Plant Metabolism Research Center
- Impedance Imaging Research Center
- Hye-Jung Cultural Research Institute
- Skin Bio-Technology Center
- Industrial Liaison Research Institute
- Institute of Natural Science
- Institute of Life Science and Resources
- Research Institute of Sports Science
- Institute of Multimedia Technology
- Materials Research Center for Information Display
- Regional Innovation Center-Components and Materials for Information Display

== Rankings ==
University rankings
JoongAng National	Domestic	6
QS National	General	8
THE National	General	8–10
ARWU National	Research	7–9
QS Asia (Asia version)	General	40
THE Asia (Asia version)	General	=45
USNWR Asia	General	=128
ARWU World	Research	301–400
QS World	General	=331
THE World	General	251–300
USNWR World	General	=487

For 2020, Kyung Hee University was ranked 6th in South Korea, 40th in Asia, and 247th in the world, according to the QS World University Rankings. The university's Hospitality and Leisure Management program was ranked 50th in the world in 2018, the highest of all of the school's program areas.

In 2023, Kyung Hee University was also ranked 6th overall in South Korea by the JoongAng Ilbo University Rankings, one of the most influential national university evaluations in the country.

== Notable alumni ==
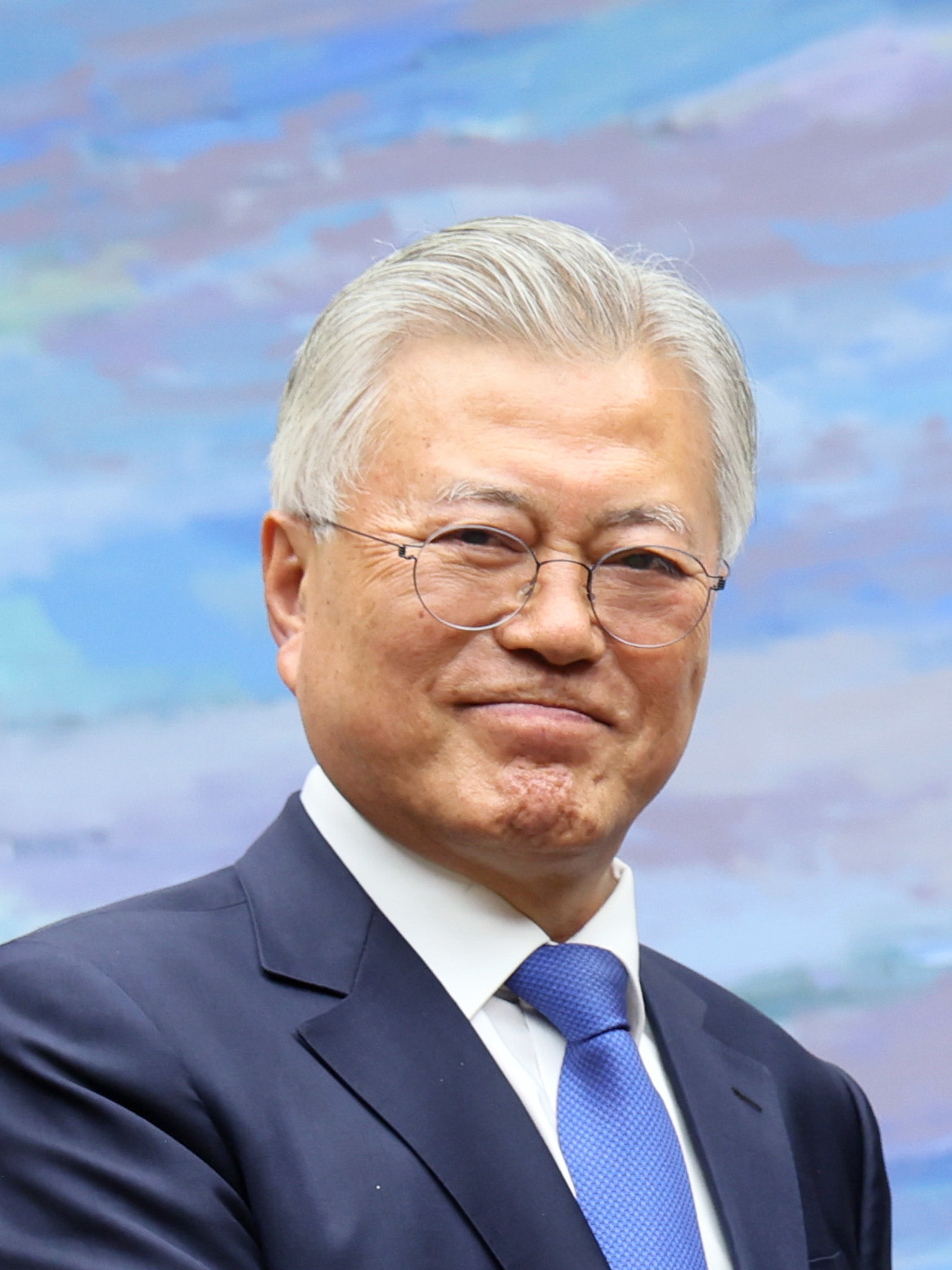
Moon Jae-in, 12th President of South Korea

=== Politics, government and public service ===
- Moon Jae-in – 12th President of South Korea
- Kim Jung-sook – First Lady of South Korea
- Steven Seokho Choi – California State Assemblyman
- Kim Dae-Jung – 8th President of South Korea

=== Literature and arts ===
- Han Su-san – author
- Cho Hae-il – author
- Jeong Ho-seung – poet
- Kim Jong-ok – author
- Won Tae-yeon – poet
- Kwak Jae-yong – film director, screenwriter

=== Sports ===
- Yeo Hong-chul – gymnast, Olympic silver medalist
- Yun Mi-jin – archer, Olympic gold medalist
- Lee Ho-Suk – short track speedskater, Olympic gold medalist
- Kong Young-il – one of the twelve original masters of taekwondo
- Dai-won Moon – Mexican martial artist, known as the "Father of Mexican Taekwondo"
- Park Jong-hwan – former manager of the South Korea national football team
- Kim Jong-kyu – basketball player
- Lee Woon-jae – football goalkeeper, former member of the South Korea national football team
- Park Kun-ha – former football player, and coach of the South Korea national under-23 football team
- Lee Jung-soo – football player
- Lee Ho – football player
- Yoon Kyung-shin – handball player

=== Entertainment ===
- Bang Yong-guk (B.A.P)
- Byun Baek-hyun (EXO)
- Cha Hun (N.Flying)
- Cho Hye-ri (Wax)
- Cho Kyu-hyun (Super Junior)
- Cho Yi-hyun
- Choi Whee-sung
- Do Kyung-soo (D.O of EXO)
- Go Joon-hee
- Gong Yoo
- Han Da-min
- Han Ga-in
- Han Seung-yeon (Kara)
- Hwang Hee
- Hwang Seung-eon
- Hwang Soo-jung
- Hwang Yoon-seok (Hwanhee of Fly to the Sky)
- Im Chang-kyun (I.M of Monsta X)
- Im Hyun-sik
- Im Jung-eun
- Jang Do-yeon
- Jang Seo-hee
- Jang Su-won (Sechs Kies)
- Jeon Ji-yoon (4Minute)
- Jo Kwon (2AM)
- Jun Kwang-ryul
- Jung Yoon-hak
- Jung Ji-hoon (Rain)
- Jung Joon-ho
- Jung Woo
- Kang Dae-sung (Big Bang)
- Kang Min-kyung (Davichi)
- Kang San-eh
- Kang Shin-il
- Kim Hae-sook
- Kim Hyung-soo (Brother Su)
- Kim In-seong (SF9)
- Kim Ji-seok
- Kim Jong-dae (Chen of EXO)
- Kim Jong-wook
- Kim Jun-myeon (Suho of EXO)
- Kim Min-jun (Jun. K of 2PM)
- Kim Nam-joo
- Kim Ok-vin
- Kim Seok-woo (Rowoon of SF9)
- Kim Seol-hyun (AOA)
- Kim So-hyang
- Kim Sun-a
- Kim Sung-ryung
- Kim Tae-ri
- Kim Tae-woo (g.o.d)
- Kim Yi-ji (Kim E-Z)
- Kim Yeon-ji (SeeYa)
- Kim Yoo-ri
- Kim Young-woon (Kangin of Super Junior)
- Kwon Ji-yong (G-Dragon of Big Bang)
- Lee Hae-ri (Davichi)
- Lee Il-hwa
- Lee Hong-gi (F.T. Island)
- Lee Hyo-ri
- Lee Joo-young
- Lee Ki-chan
- Lee Kyu-hyung
- Lee Ok-joo (Tymee)
- Lee Seung-hyung
- Lee Tae-sun
- Lim Seul-ong (2AM)
- Min Kyung-hoon (Buzz)
- Na Tae-joo
- Ock Joo-hyun
- Oh Min-suk
- Oh Na-ra
- Oh Seung-hoon
- Park Chan-yeol (EXO)
- Park Hyo-shin
- Park Ji-yoon
- Park Na-rae (Spica)
- Park Soo-ah (Lizzy of After School and Orange Caramel)
- Park Soo-jin
- Park Ye-eun (Wonder Girls)
- Park Yoo-chun (JYJ)
- Ryu Hwa-young
- Seo Ji-hoon
- Shim Chang-min (TVXQ)
- Shin Bo-ra
- Sung Yu-ri
- Yoon Doo-joon (Highlight)
- Yoon Eun-hye
- Yoon Kye-sang (g.o.d)

== See also ==
- Education in South Korea
- Kyung Hee Cyber University
- List of universities and colleges in South Korea
