= Kim Insuk =

South Korean writer

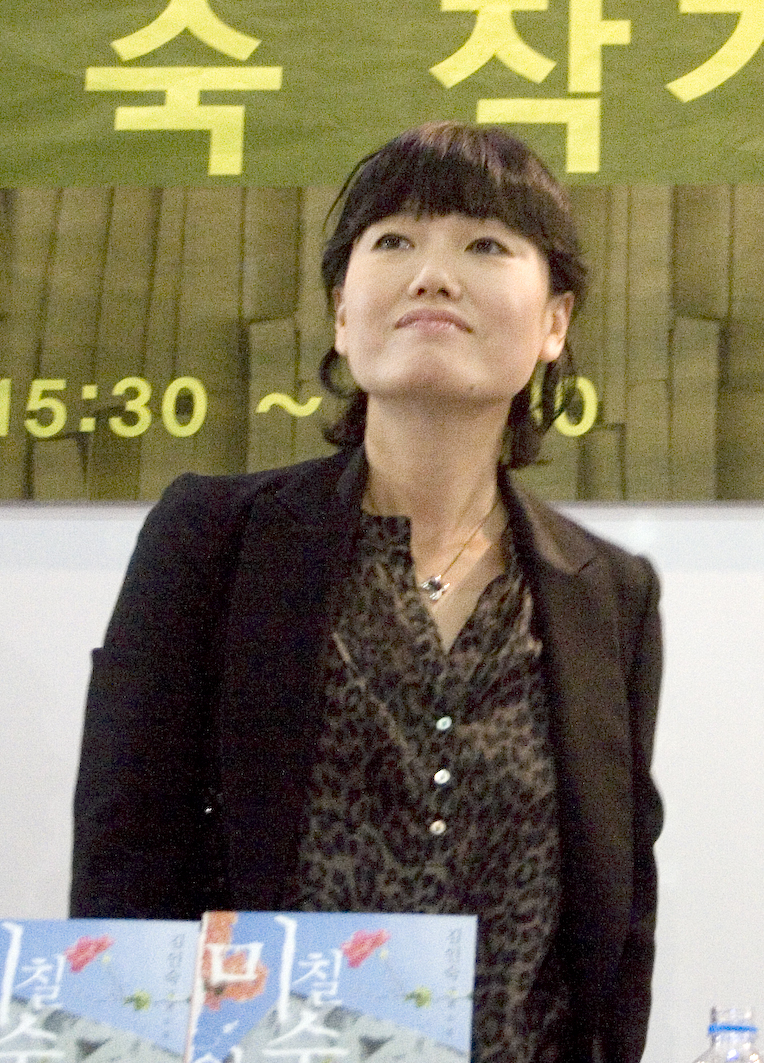
- Kim at the Seoul Book Fair, 2011
- Born: 1963 (age 62–63)
- Occupation: Writer
- Writing career
- Language: Korean

- Kim Insuk
- Hangul: 김인숙
- RR: Gim Insuk
- MR: Kim Insuk

Kim Insuk (Korean: 김인숙) is a South Korean writer.

== Life ==
Kim Insuk was born in 1963 in Seoul. She suffered the death of her father when she was five years old. She spent her childhood under the mother of a hostess. She graduated from Jinmyeong Girls' High School and Yonsei University. She is an author from the Korean 386 generation (Coin termed in the early 1990s describing writers who were in their 30s, attended university in the 1980s, and born in the 1960s). She, along with Shin Kyung-sook and Gong Ji-young, is one of the prominent new wave of female writers from that group. Kim began her writing career early, making her literary debut when she had just entered university, at the age of 20 (Korean age in 1983, when she won Chosun Ilbo Literary Contest). She has won all three of Korea's major literary awards, the Yi Sang Literary Award, Dong-in Literary Award, and Daesan, and she has had more than 30 books published. She has also lived in China in this decade; and in Spring 2011 was living in Dalian with her daughter.

== Work ==
Unusually, Kim's work focuses extensively on the experience of Korean expatriates. In fact, her book The Long Road (which won the Hankook Ilbo Literary Award the same year it was published) is the only piece of “expat” Korean fiction that has been translated into English. That book is among her fiction that draws the time she spent living in Australia in the 1990s. In 2003 Kim won the Yi Sang Literary award for her work Ocean and Butterfly (Bada-wa nabi) and in 2010 she won the Dong-in Literary Award for Bye, Elena (Annyeong, ellena). Her latest work in Korean, To Be Insane (Michil su issgessni, i salm-e) had its publication delayed at Kim's request. The story featured a massively destructive earthquake and tsunami, and Kim believed that it would have been inappropriate to release this work just after the earthquake and tsunami that hit Japan.

== Works in Translation ==
- The Long Road(MerwinAsia, 2010)
- Stab (ASIA PUBLISHERS, 2013)

== Works in Korean (Partial) ==
=== Novels ===
- Bloodline (Pitjul 1983)
- '79-'80 Between Winter and Spring ( '79-'80 Gyeoul-eseo bom sai 1987)
- So I Embrace You (Geuraesea neo-reul anneunda 1993)
- The Long Road (Meon gil 1995)
- Flower's Memory (Kkot-ui gieok 1999)
- To Be Insane (Michil su issgessni, i salm-e)
- Ocean and Butterfly (Bada-wa nabi)
- That Woman's Autobiography (2005)
- Bye, Elena (Annyeong, ellena 2009)
- Sohyeon(2010)
- To Be Insane(2011)

=== Short stories ===
- Blade and Love (Kallal-gwa sarang 1993)
- Glass Shoes (Yuri Gudu 1998)
- Waiting for a Brass Band (Brass Band-reul gidarimyeo 2001)

== Awards ==
- Yu Ju-hyeon Literature Prize (1984)
- Republic of Korea Literary Art Prize (1993)
- Hankook Ilbo Literary Award (1995)
- Isan Literature Prize (1996)
- Contemporary Literature (Hyundae Munhak) Award (2000)
- Yi Sang Literary Award (2003 for Ocean and Butterfly)
- Yi Soo Literary Award (2005)
- Daesan Literary Award (2006)
- Dong-in Literary Award (2010 for Bye, Elena)
- Hwang Sun-won Literary Prize (2012)

== See also ==
- Korean literature
- List of Korean novelists
- List of Korean female writers
