= Song Kyung-dong =

South Korean poet (born 1967)

- Born: 1967 (age 58–59)
- Citizenship: Korean
- Writing career
- Language: Korean
- Genre: Poetry

Korean name
- Hangul: 송경동
- RR: Song Gyeongdong
- MR: Song Kyŏngdong

Song Kyung-dong (Korean: 송경동; born 1967) is a South Korean poet. He is best known for his proletarian poems, which portray the lives of the masses as a symbol of resistance and revolution in a neoliberal age. Having witnessed working-class struggles during his time as a carpenter, welder, and plumber, Song writes about the contradictions of social structures and the pursuit of human dignity. His poetry expresses rage against injustice, compassion for and solidarity with the weak, and ultimately the desire for a more equal world. His first poetry collection, Kkuljam (꿀잠 Sound Sleep), was published in 2006, followed by the poetry collection Sasohan mureumdeure dapam (사소한 물음들에 답함 Answer to Trivial Questions) in 2009, the essay collection Kkumkkuneun ja japyeoganda (꿈꾸는 자 잡혀간다 Dreamers Are Dragged Away) in 2011, and the poetry collection Naneun hangugini anida (나는 한국인이 아니다 I Am Not Korean) in 2016. He is the winner of the Geochang Literary Award for Peace and Human Rights, Cheon Sang-byeong Poetry Prize, Sin Dong-yup Prize for Literature, Gu Bon-ju Art Award, Democratic Media Special Award, May 18 Wildfire Award, Gosan Yun Seon-do Literary Award, and Beautiful Writer Award.

== Life ==
Song Kyung-dong was born into a middle-class family in Boseong County, South Korea in 1967. He was born and raised in Beolgyo, a town in Boseong County surrounded by mountains, fields, and the sea. His hometown would later provide inspiration for his poems on the beauty of human nature and the value of living an honest life. He began to harbor ambitions to become a poet in middle school when his teacher praised a poem he wrote about the spring rain. Once he finished high school, he shuttled between his hometown and Seoul, taking on various blue-collar jobs including carpentry, welding, and plumbing. It was only in 1991, when he was working in a subway construction site in Seoul, that he remembered his old dream and sought out the Guro Society for Proletarian Literature. There, he learned about proletarian poetry from poets Kim Nam-Ju, Lee Si-young, and Jung Hee Sung. He began writing poems about workers whose lives had been ruined by industrial accidents and the growing contradictions of South Korea's neoliberal society.

Song has fought for and written about the rights of workers and other marginalized groups, in particular regarding the Kiryung Electronics worker strike, Yongsan Tragedy (a violent clash between Yongsan residents and riot police in 2009 over an urban redevelopment project, resulting in six deaths), Hope Bus protests, Ssangyong Motors occupation, and sinking of MV Sewol, among others. He writes firsthand accounts of protest scenes and in turn shares his poetry with the protesters, which has earned him the nicknames "poet of action" and "the poet on the scene."

== Writing ==
Song Kyung-dong's poetry is marked by a revolutionary spirit, reflecting the workers' objections to the oppressions of capitalism and their increasing self-estrangement under the neoliberal system. Song participates in protests alongside temporary workers and other marginalized groups and translates their experience into poetry. He questions why they must be subject to such oppression and alienation, and criticizes the capitalist brand of ethics that forbids starving people from stealing food. His work can be described as lyric resistance poetry in that it expresses not only rage at social injustices but also hope for a world where workers are liberated from exploitation. While Song uses aggressive language to communicate the pain and anger of the oppressed, he does not show open hostility or hatred toward the oppressor. Rather, the dominant sentiment in his work is sympathy for the despair and intrinsic loneliness of people. His poems envision a world where the solitary individual is reconciled with the collective identity. They are not so much a vindictive attack on the oppressor but a manifesto for a dignified life attained through labor. This theme is encapsulated in a line from one of his poems: "A tear falls on the metal powder of factories mixed with the soil and dust of streets, and from it blooms a flower." Song's works capture the realities of his times and reveal a longing for a beautiful world.

== Bibliography ==
=== Poetry ===
- Sound Sleep. Seoul: Samchang. 2006. ISBN 9788990492265.
- Answer to Trivial Questions. Seoul: Chanbi. 2009. ISBN 9788936423100.
- I Am Not Korean. Seoul: Chanbi. 2016. ISBN 9788936423940.

=== Essay ===
- Dreamers Are Dragged Away. Seoul: Silcheon Munhak. 2011. ISBN 9788939206687.

== Awards ==
- Geochang Literary Award for Peace and Human Rights, 2009
- Cheon Sang-byeong Poetry Prize, 2010
- Shin Dong-yup Prize for Literature, 2011
- Gu Bon-ju Art Award, 2011
- Democratic Media Special Award, 2011
- May 18 Wildfire Award, 2012
- Gosan Yun Seon-do Literary Award, 2016
- Beautiful Writer Award, 2016
