= Kim Wonu =

South Korean novelist

- Born: April 11, 1947 (age 79); Jinju, Korea
- Education: Kyungpook National University, Sogang University
- Writing career
- Language: Korean

Korean name
- Hangul: 김원우
- Hanja: 金源祐
- RR: Gim Wonu
- MR: Kim Wŏnu

Kim Wonu (Korean: 김원우) is a modern South Korean novelist.

== Life ==
Kim Wonu was born on April 11, 1947, with sources unclear on whether he was born in Gimhae Gyeongsangnam-do or Jinju Gyeongsangnam-do, Korea. Kim attended Gyeongbuk University from which he received his B.A. in English and Sogang University from which he received his M.A. in Korean. He has been a member of the group "Jakga" since 1979 and served as Editor in Chief on Minumsa Publishing.

== Work ==
Kim Wonu made his literary debut in 1977 with the novella Appointed Posts (Imji), a scathing critique of the philistinism and commodity fetishism that he saw as pervasive in middle-class Korean society. Everyday lives of middle-class Koreans in all its unabashed materialism and self-interest, is a theme in the entire body of Kim Wonu's fiction. His characters possess little or no individual personality, and can only find meaning in their lives through the ceaseless pursuit of profit. Because they are so entrenched in immediate material gratification, they fail to realize the sterility of their lives; Kim Wonu, therefore, frequently employs an outside agent to act as a mediator in his fiction.

Kim Wonu's fiction expresses a certain reflectiveness that has much to do with the way in which Kim's own experiences inform his fictional accounts. The falsity and hypocrisy that underlie middle-class rhetoric of success is part of his life as well; a sense of weariness generated by life's routines can be detected in Kim's reminiscences of his own youth. Kim Wonu's critical voice thus conveys something stubborn yet honest: combined with descriptions of ordinary people and events, this voice allows Kim Wonu's works to offer intellectually engaging portraits of life that are at once fiercely critical and heart-warming, without simply being "novels of manners".

Kim has won the 1998 Dong-sa Literature Award and the 2002 Daesan Literature Prize.

== Works in Translation ==
Chinese

- 禽兽的日子 (짐승의 시간)

== Works in Korean (Partial) ==
Story Collections

- Non-organic Youth (Mugijil cheongnyeon, 1981)
- Life Studies (Insaeng gongbu, 1983)
- Hour of the Beasts (Jimseungui sigan, 1986)
- Racing through the Obstacle Course (Jangaemul gyeongju, 1986)
- Your Winter (Gyeoul sogui neo)
- A Story of Three Sisters (Sejamae iyagi, 1988)
- Remote Days (Adeukhan nanal)
- Naked Heart (Beolgeobeoseun maeum)
- The Sea of Patriots (Ugugui bada, 1993)

== Awards ==
- 1991 Dong-in Literary Award
- 1998 Dong-sa Literature Award
- 2002 Daesan Literature Prize
