= Yoh Suk-kee =

Professor from Korea, Scholar from Korea

Yoh Suk-kee (a.k.a. Yeo Seok-ki, Korean: 여석기; 6 March 1922 – 12 June 2014) was a South Korean theatre critic and Shakespeare scholar. He was a founding member of The English Language and Literature Association of Korea (ELLAK). He was appointed the Director of Korean Culture and Arts Foundation in 1988. He received the Medal of Honour in Civil Merit in 1972 and 1987, and the Order of Cultural Merit in 1996, from the Korean government. He died on 12 June 2014.

== Biography ==
Yoh was born in Geumneung, Keishōhoku Prefecture, Korea, Empire of Japan. He graduated from Gimcheon High School. He entered Tokyo University in 1939 but left the school due to student conscription in 1944. After the liberation of Korea in August 1945, he transferred to Seoul National University in 1946. He was appointed the English professor at Korea University since October 1953 and held position of Dean of College of Liberal Arts and Graduate School.

=== Theater criticism ===
Yoh was a forerunner of theatre criticism in Korea. In 1960, with other theatricians, such as Chi-jin Yoo, Yoh established Drama Center and trained young playwrights to cultivate Korean theatre. For such a contribution, he was selected as a member of National Academy of Sciences of the Republic of Korea. In 1970, as a publisher and editor, Yoh published the first issue of The Drama Review, the first technical journal of theatre in Korea. In commemoration of Yoh, the International Association of Theatre Critics-Korea bestows Yoh Suk-kee Theatre Critics Award each year.

=== Shakespeare studies ===
Yoh was evaluated as the first scholar to encompass both literary and theatrical aspect of Shakespeare. In 1962, he provided a translation of Hamlet for the Drama Centre first performance which is staged by the playwright Yoo Chi-jin. In 1964, Yoh founded The Shakespeare Association of Korea.

== Publications ==
- History of English Literature (영문학사, 1962)
- 20th Century Literature (20세기 문학론, 1967)
- Contemporary Theatre (현대연극, 1969)
- The Reality of Korean Theatre (한국 연극의 현실, 1976)
- Hallucination and Reality (co-authored, 환각과 현실, 1982)
- Comparative Studies of the East-West Theatres (동서연극의 비교연구, 1987)
- Essay Shakespeare Selections (에세이 셰익스피어 명작선, 1991)
- Cinemania (씨네마니아, 1996)
- Journey with Hamlet, Encounter with Lear (햄릿과의 여행 리어와의 만남, 2001)
- My Lectures on Hamlet (나의 햄릿 강의, 2008)
- Yoh Suk-kee: My Life, My Studies, My Theatre (여석기 나의 삶 나의 학문 나의 연극, 2012)

== Honours and positions ==
- 1962 Director of Drama Centre (드라마센터 초대 연극아카데미원장)
- 1966 Jury Member of Asia Film Festival (아시아영화제 심사위원)
- 1969–1971 President of The English Language and Literature Association of Korea (한국영어영문학회 회장)
- 1970–1980 Publisher of Theatre Criticism (『연극평론』 발행인)
- 1972 Medal of Honour in Civil Merit (Magnolia Medal) (국민훈장 목련장)
- 1975–1984 Chair of International Theatre Institute of Korea (국제극예술협회 한국본부 위원장)
- 1982 Director of International Cultural Foundation (국제문화재단 이사)
- 1982–1984 Chair of The Shakespeare Association of Korea (한국셰익스피어학회 회장)
- 1983 Jury Member of Manila International Film Festival (제2회 마닐라국제영화제 심사위원)
- 1984 Chief Director of Korean Foundation for International Cultural Exchange (국제교류진흥회 이사장)
- 1985 Dong-Rang Award of Theatre (동랑연극상)
- 1987 Order of Civil Merit (Peony Medal) (국민훈장 모란장)
- 1987–1991 President of International Association of Theatre Critics Korea (연극평론가협회장)
- 1988–1991 Director of Korea Arts & Culture Education Service (한국문화예술진흥원 원장)
- 1992–1994 Chair of Korea Broadcasting Commission (종합유선방송위원회 위원장)
- 1996 Order of Cultural Merit (Silver Certificate) (은관문화훈장)
