= Nam Jin-woo =

South Korean poet, literary critic, and professor

Nam Jin-Woo (Hangul 남진우; born 1960) is a South Korean poet, literary critic, and professor.

== Life ==
Nam Jin-Woo was born in Jeonju, South Korea in 1960. He studied creative writing at Chung-Ang University, where he also received his master's and doctoral degrees. His literary career began when he won the Dong-a Ilbo New Writer's Contest for poetry in 1981 and the Chosun Ilbo New Writer's Contest for literary criticism in 1983. He was an editor at the quarterly journal Munhakdongne and the monthly journal Hyeondaesihak. Since 2004, he has been teaching creative writing at Myongji University.

In the 1980s, he was a member of the literary society Siundong ("poetry movement") alongside poets Ha Jae-bong, Lee Moon-jae, and Park Deok-kyu. In 1999, he married the novelist Shin Kyung-sook. As a poet and critic, he played a major role in turning Munhakdongne into a quarterly magazine that introduced the latest Korean literature in the 1990s. In 1992, he accused writer Lee In-hwa for plagiarizing his debut novel Naega nuguinji malhal su itneun janeun nuguinga (내가 누구인지 말할 수 있는 자는 누구인가 Who Is It That Can Tell Me Who I Am) from other sources, and has since participated in other plagiarism debates. In the early 2000s, he actively voiced his opinion on the controversy over whether Munhakdongne, along with several other literary journals, was exercising too much power in the South Korean literary scene. In 2015, he became involved in a plagiarism debate once again, this time surrounding his wife and novelist Shin Kyung-sook. As the debate intensified, Nam resigned from the Munhakdongne editing committee.

Nam has earned critical and popular acclaim for his literary criticism and poetry. He won the 8th Dongsuh Literary Award for best criticism in 1995, the 9th Kim Daljin Literature Prize for best poetry in 1998, the 11th Socheon Lee Heon-gu Literary Criticism Award in 1999, the 46th Hyundae Literary Award for best criticism in 2001, the 13th Palbong Literary Criticism Award in 2002, the 15th Daesan Literary Award for best poetry in 2007, and the 22nd Daesan Literary Award for best criticism in 2014.

== Writing ==
Nam Jin-Woo is sometimes referred to as a "pilgrim who does not stop pursuing what is sacred or mysterious." Since his first poetry collection Gipeun gose geumureul deuriura (깊은 곳에 그물을 드리우라 Cast the Net into Deep Waters), he has primarily been concerned with the transcendental sacred. He attempts to "reach the sacred by writing about the impossibility of sacredness in this unfortunate era."

Nam uses imagery such as flames, sand dunes, unexpected visits by animals, the deep hue of death, and distant sounds. Nam's work has strong religious and fatalist themes. He believes that his task as a poet is to persistently seek salvation even if it proves impossible.

== Works ==
=== Poetry collections ===
1. 『깊은 곳에 그물을 드리우라』(민음사, 1990) : 재판(문학동네, 1997)

Cast the Net into Deep Waters. Minumsa, 1990.

(second edition published by Munhakdongne in 1997)

2. 『죽은 자를 위한 기도』(문학과지성사, 1997)

Prayer for the Dead. Moonji, 1997.

3. 『타오르는 책』(문학과지성사, 2000)

Burning Book. Moonji, 2000.

4. 『새벽 세 시의 사자 한 마리』(문학과지성사, 2006)

A Lion at Three in the Morning. Moonji, 2006.

5. 『사랑의 어두운 저편』(창비, 2009)

The Dark Side of Love. Changbi, 2009.

=== Criticism ===
1. 『바벨탑의 언어』(문학과지성사, 1989)

The Language of Babel. Moonji, 1989.

2. 『신성한 숲』(민음사, 1995)

Sacred Forest. Minumsa, 1995.

3. 『숲으로 된 성벽』(문학동네, 1999;2010)

Castle Wall of Trees. Munhakdongne, 1999 & 2010.

4. 『그리고 신은 시인을 창조했다󰡕(문학동네, 2001)

And God Created Poets. Munhakdongne, 2001.

5. 『나사로의 시학』(문학동네, 2013)

The Poetics of Lazarus. Munhakdongne, 2013.

6. 『폐허에서 꿈꾸다』(문학동네, 2013)

Dreaming from Ruins. Munhakdongne, 2013.

=== Essay collections ===
1. 『올페는 죽을 때 나의 직업은 시라고 하였다』(열림원, 2000) : 재판(문학동네, 2010)

At the Time of His Death, Orpheus Said His Profession Was a Poet. Yolimwon, 2010.

=== Monographs ===
1. 『미적 근대성과 순간의 시학』(소명출판, 2001)

Aesthetic Modernity and the Poetics of the Moment. Somyung Books, 2001.

=== Works in translation ===
1. PO&SIE: Poésie sud-coréenne numéro 88 (French)

2. A Lion at Three in the Morning: Poems of Nam-Jin Woo. Translated by Young-Shil Cho. Homa & Sekey Books, 2017.

== Awards ==
1. 1995: 8th Dongsuh Literary Award (criticism category)

2. 1998: 9th Kim Daljin Literature Prize (poetry category)

3. 1999: 11th Socheon Lee Heon-gu Literary Criticism Award

4. 2001: 46th Hyundae Literary Award (criticism category)

5. 2002: 13th Palbong Literary Criticism Award

6. 2007: 15th Daesan Literary Award (poetry category)

7. 2014: 22nd Daesan Literary Award (criticism category)
