= Kim Taeyong (writer) =

South Korean writer (born 1974)

Kim Taeyong (Korean: 김태용; born 1974) is a South Korean writer.

== Life ==
Kim Taeyong was born in Seoul in 1974. He graduated in creative writing from Soongsil University. He began his literary career when his short story “Oreunjjogeseo sebeonjjae jip” (오른쪽에서 세 번째 집 The Third House from the Right) was published in the 2005 spring issue of the quarterly literary magazine Segyeuimunhak. He has won the Hankook Ilbo Literary Award, Moonji Literary Award, KimHyun Literary Award.

== Writing ==
Many of Kim Taeyong's stories are about writing itself. In the title story of his second collection “Poju iyagi” (포주 이야기 A Pimp's Story), the pimp, who is the narrator, starts writing a will with the sentence ‘I was a pimp’, and struggles to write the next sentence. The incapable pimp is the alter ego of the writer. The narrator who used to be a pimp, goes under inner conflict after learning how to write from a university student who had come out as a volunteer for the elderly with not relatives. The narrator had never even had the desire to think about the meaning of his life as a pimp before learning to write. He confesses that “as I write, I feel that my sin is getting bigger, and heavier. The history of more and more wicked sins concealed among the words is torturing me. Strangely, I cannot stop. I feel that I am getting further from my memories as I am calling upon them to write.” Such distrust he has for writing can also stand for the distrust that the author has for writing.

== Works ==
- Eumak ijeonui chaek (음악 이전의 책 A book before music), 2018
- Beolgeosung-ideul (벌거숭이들 The Naked), 2014.
- Poju iyagi (포주 이야기 A Pimp's Story), 2012.
- Sumgimeopsi namgimeopsi (숨김없이 남김없이 Without Hiding, Without a Trace), 2010.
- Pulbat wiui dwaeji (풀밭 위의 돼지 The Pig on the Grass), 2007.

=== Works in translation ===
- J'étais un maquereau (French)
- "Pig on Grass (Massachusetts Review, summer 2013), translated by Bruce and Ju-Chan Fulton" (PDF). massreview.org.

== Awards ==
- Hankook Ilbo Literary Award, 2008.
- Moonji Literary Award, 2012.
- KimHyun Literary Award, 2016.
