= Lee Kang-baek =

South Korean playwright (born 1947)

Lee Kang-Baek
- Born: December 1, 1947 (age 78); Jeonju, North Jeolla Province, South Korea
- Occupation: Playwright
- Spouse: Kim Hye-Soon
- Writing career
- Language: Korean

- Korean name
- Hangul: 이강백
- Hanja: 李康白
- RR: I Gangbaek
- MR: I Kangbaek

Lee Kang-baek (born December 1, 1947) is a South Korean playwright.

== Life ==
Lee Kang-Baek was born on December 1, 1947, in Jeonju, North Jeolla Province, South Korea Lee recounts that as a youth he was shocked to discover from French nouveaux romans and Samuel Beckett’s En attendant Godot that literary works could have unclear plotlines and circular plot structures. His early love for such works highly influenced his own literary productions.

== Work ==
Lee has published roughly thirty dramas, all in the anti-realist style. Lee writes dramas almost exclusively, and most of his work has been staged. This attests to the playwright’s professionalism and dedication to his craft.

Most of Lee’s dramas are fables/allegories. Lee often employs allegory to critically address social and political problems. While his works are surrealist in style, they resonate with social realities. His works occupy a niche in the Korean dramatic milieu which has generally set a high value on realism.

Many of his early plays use allegory to depict hapless individuals weighed down by the brutal authority of the then-military government, whose regime solidified its power by instilling fear of a North Korean attack into the citizens. As state oppression reached a peak in the late 1970s, Lee used "silent plays," dramas without words, to reflect the social and political climate of the time.

From the 1980s, Lee’s plays allegorized social conflicts between the "haves" and the "have nots," or criticized the social leadership’s remorseless greed. Lee’s more recent plays concern themselves less with external social phenomena than exposing the philosophical agony of human life, often explored by contrasting extremely serious characters with extremely easygoing ones.

== Works in Translation ==
- Allegory of survival : the theater of Lee Kang-Baek (이강백 희곡선)

== Works in Korean (Partial) ==
- The Watchman (Pasuggun) (1973)
- The Doghorn (Gaebbul) (1979)
- One Spring Day (Bomnal) (1984)
- Head of the Blowfish (Bugeo daegari) (1993)
- Diary of a Trip to Yeongweol (Yeongweol haeng ilgi) (1995)
- A Feeling Like Nirvana (Neuggim, geugnak gat’eun) staged under the direction by Lee Yun-taek (1998)
- Oh God! (O, mapsosa) (2000)
