= Hochul (surname) =

Hochul (Polish: Hochuł [ˈxɔxuw]) is a surname of Polish origin. It is a non-standard form or respelling of Chochół. Notable people with the surname include:

- Kathy Hochul (born 1958), American lawyer and politician
- William J. Hochul Jr. (born 1959), American politician, husband of Kathy

== See also ==
- Chochół, Chochoł or Chochol, cognates of Hochul, with standard Polish and Czech spelling
- Hochul (given name), an unrelated Korean given name
- Hochuli, an unrelated Swiss surname
- Hucul (surname), an unrelated Ukrainian surname
