= Hwang Tong-gyu =

South Korean literary scholar (born 1938)

Hwang Donggyu
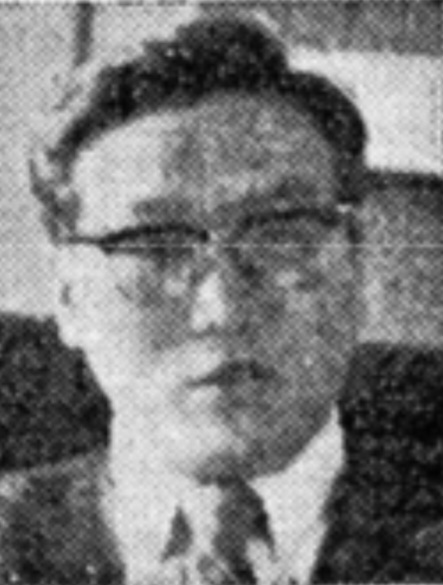
- Born: April 9, 1938 (age 88); South P'yŏngan, Sukchon County, Korea, Empire of Japan
- Citizenship: South Korean
- Education: Seoul National University
- Occupations: Professor, writer
- Writing career
- Language: Korean

Korean name
- Hangul: 황동규
- Hanja: 黃東奎
- RR: Hwang Donggyu
- MR: Hwang Tonggyu

Hwang Donggyu (Korean: 황동규; born April 9, 1938) is a South Korea poet, academic professor, and critic, and the eldest son of novelist Hwang Sun-won.

== Life ==
Hwang Donggyu was born in South P'yŏngan, Sukchon County, Korea, Empire of Japan. During the Korean War he moved to Seoul, South Korea, where he earned a degree in English literature from Seoul National University and completed his graduate studies. His literary career began with the publication of works such as "October" (Si-wol) and "A Letter of Delight" (Jeulgeo-un pyeonji) in the journal Contemporary Literature (Hyundae Munhak). Hwang Donggyu is currently a professor of English literature at Seoul National University. He has received several Korean literary prizes.

== Work ==
Hwang Donggyu's early poetry often addresses themes of longing and introspection, incorporating melancholic imagery. His works, such as "October" (Si-wol) and "A Letter of Delight" (Jeulgeo-un pyeonji), depict emotional landscapes that reflect personal and societal tensions. In "Elegy" (Biga), Hwang adopts the perspective of an outsider to examine the relationship between individual identity and external circumstances. Additionally, works like "The Song of Peace" (Taepyeongga), "Snow Falling on the Three Southern Provinces" (Samname naelinun nun), and "Yeolha-ilgi" demonstrate his use of irony and narrative voice to engage with historical and contemporary themes.

Over time, Hwang Donggyu's poetry evolved toward minimalistic imagery and direct language, moving away from earlier elaborate expressions. His later works incorporate contemporary themes while maintaining elements of traditional poetic forms. In "Wind Burial" (Pungjang), Hwang explores mortality and the process of acceptance, while "The Intolerable Lightness of Being" (Gyeondil su eobs-i gabyeo-un jonjaedeul) exemplifies experimentation with linguistic fluidity and poetic structure.

== Works in translation ==
- Wind Burial (풍장)
- Die Horen. Zeitschrift für Literatur, Kunst und Kritik (독일문예지 誌 -한국문학 특집호)
- Windbestattung (풍장)
- Posada de nubes y otros poemas (황동규 시선 <몰운대행>)

== Works in Korean (Partial) ==
- A Shiny Day (Eotteon gae-in nal),
- A Falling Snow in Samnam (Samname naelineun nun)
- Yeolha-ilgi
- I Want to Paint When I See the Rock (Naneun bakwileul bomyeon gulligo sip-eojinda)
- A Journey to Morundae (Morundae haeng)
- Wind burial (Pungjang)

== Awards ==
- Korean Literature Award (1980)
- Isan Literature Prize (1991)
- Midang Literary Award (2002)
- Manhae Prize (2006)
- Ho-Am Prize in the Arts (2016)
