= Oh Soo-yeon (novelist) =

South Korean writer (born 1964)

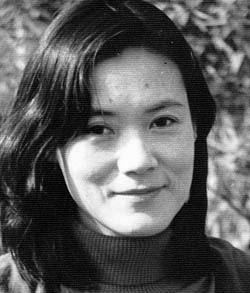
- Born: 1964 (age 61–62)
- Writing career
- Language: Korean

Korean name
- Hangul: 오수연
- Hanja: 吳受姸
- RR: O Suyeon
- MR: O Suyŏn

Oh Soo-yeon (Korean: 오수연) is a modern South Korean writer.

== Life ==
Oh Soo-yeon was born in 1964 in South Korea and began her literary career in 1994 with National Holiday in the Land of Dwarves which portrays the lives of two college friends Min-cheol and Mi-seon ten years after their participation in the student democracy movement of the 1980s. After she published Vacant House in 1997, she lived in India for two years. Oh is actively involved in supporting Third World countries, and in 2003 visited Iraq and Palestine as a literary representative of the anti-war movement.

== Work ==
In her debut work, National Holiday in the Land of Dwarves, Lee combines the theme of nihilism that swept over the young people after the post-democracy movement with her interest in feminist issues in a patriarchal society. Vacant House places greater emphasis on feminist perspective. The author's broader concern, however, is “peripheral lives” or the struggles of those people who remain outside the spheres of power and acceptance by the mainstream. The characters in National Holiday in the Land of Dwarves represent such people: as political dissidents in the 1980s, they are alienated from the establishment and the mainstream and once again in 1990's they find themselves ostracized by their own friends who have adapted all too readily to the societal changes and new value system. In her feminist works, O focuses on women as outsiders and outcasts of a male-centered society.

With India as its background, Kitchen, a collection of linked stories published after the author returned from India, features foreigners as central characters who meet and interact in the communal space of kitchen. The protagonist, a woman from Korea, matures through the clash of different value systems In 1994, Oh won the New Artist Award, in 2001 the Hanguk Ilbo Literature award, and in 2006 the Beautiful Artist Award.

== Works in Korean (Partial) ==
=== Novel ===
- National Holiday in the Land of Dwarves (1994)

=== Short story collection ===
- Vacant House (1997)

=== Essay collection ===
- Don't Die, Abu Ali(2004)

== Awards ==
- New Artist Award (1994)
- Hanguk Ilbo Literature Award (2001)
- The Beautiful Artist Award (2006)
