= Yi In-hwa =

South Korean writer (born 1966)

- Born: Lyou Chul-gyun; January 5, 1966 (age 60); Daegu, South Korea
- Education: Ph.D
- Alma mater: Seoul National University
- Occupations: Professor, novelist, literary critic, playwright
- Writing career
- Language: Korean
- Notable work: Everlasting Empire (1993)

Korean name
- Hangul: 류철균
- Hanja: 柳哲鈞
- RR: Ryu Cheolgyun
- MR: Ryu Ch'ŏlgyun

Pen name
- Hangul: 이인화
- Hanja: 二人化
- RR: I Inhwa
- MR: I Inhwa

Yi In-hwa (Korean: 이인화; born January 5, 1966) is a South Korean writer, literary critic and professor.

== Biography ==
Yi was born Lyou Chul-gyun in Daegu in 1966. When young, he was inspired by his father, a professor of Korean Language and Literature at Kyungpook National University, to become a novelist one day. During his high school years, Yi won awards for various national creative writing competitions. However, after entering college, he changed his career path to become a literary critic. There, he made his debut in 1988 with a critical essay called "Study of Yang Guija" (Yang Guija ron) which was published in Literature and Society, a Korean quarterly literary magazine. After this, he was editor for a couple of literary magazines. Several years later, he published his first novel, Who Is It That Can Tell Me Who I Am (1992), ultimately becoming a novelist. His pen name, Yi In-hwa, is a character from Korean classical novel writer Yom Sang-seop's work, Before the Cries of 'Manse' (1922).

== Career ==
Yi first started his career in 1995 as Korean Literature Professor at Ewha Womans University in central Seoul before getting his Ph.D. After spending 10 years in the department of Korean Literature, he changed his concentration to digital storytelling, becoming professor of Division of Digital Media at Ewha Womans University.

Yi was attracted to the field of digital storytelling in that he started to get addicted to MMORPG. He frequently stated that he was a huge fan of MMORPG Lineage. He applied his creative writing theories to digital storytelling mainly targeted to games. He is considered to be a pioneer in the Korean digital storytelling field.

In 2016, Yi became embroiled in the Choi Soon-sil scandal when it was alleged that Yi helped Choi Soon-sil's daughter pass a class she never attended, including having his assistants take a final exam for her. He was arrested on January 3.

== Work ==
As can be deduced from its title which is taken from King Lear, Who Is It That Can Tell Me Who I Am (1992) depicts the madness of 1980s Korea and questions whether anyone was able to find his true self in that era. Yi's critical attitude toward the 80s may be a necessary step before ushering in 1990s literature, but it has often been criticized for its one-dimensional belittlement of a painful era in Korean modern history.

Yi was an unusual author for the era in that he was a supporter of the Park Chung Hee regime and in his novel The Path of Human(1997–1998) presented Park as an unequivocal hero, a stance that quickly caught the attention of the press. As a member of the so-called 3-8-6 Generation in Korea, Park would have been expected to be anti-dictator and pro-democracy, but he was not. The book sparked huge controversy among Korean intellectuals, making Yi one of the ultra-conservative novelists. Recently, he is depicted as a rather progressive figure because of his ardent opposition to Korean ruling Saenuri Party's online game regulation act.

Everlasting Empire (1993), modeled after Umberto Eco's The Name of the Rose, borrows elements of a detective novel in tracing the mystery surrounding the death of Prince Sado and his son King Jeongjo. An entertaining novel with potential for mass appeal, Everlasting Empire was also embroiled in much controversy due to the author's over-interpretation of history and the conservative statements he made. Yi's works, in general, shows a strong political leaning: at times, it is as though the author borrows the pages of his own novel to express his political views and promote the awareness of certain socio-political and historical issues. This book is one of Yi's notable works, being a million seller nationwide.

His latest fiction, Inferno 9 (2012), was originally developed for the online game under the same name. The book is about intellectually intensified humans going inside a dream world to solve a mystery. The relationship between the real world and dream world is thoroughly described in the story, combined with his fantastic creativity inspired from games.

=== Fiction works ===
- Who Is It That Can Tell Me Who I Am, (Seoul: Saegaesa, 1992)
- Everlasting Empire (Seoul: Saegaesa, 1993)
- The Path of Human (Seoul, Saegaesa, 1997–1998)
- The Fragrance of Grasslands (Seoul: Saegaesa, 1998)
- The Star of a Poet (Seoul: Munhak Sasangsa, 2000)
- Sky Flower (Dongbang Media, 2002)
- Habiro (Hainaim, 2004)
- Inferno 9 (Hainaim, 2012)

=== Non-fiction works ===
- Study on Yi Mun-yol (Seoul: Sallim, 1992)
- Isabella Bird Bishop, Korea and Her Neighbors (Seoul: Sallim, 1994) (translation work)
- Digital Storytelling (Goldenbough, 2003)
- Korean model of Digital Storytelling, (Seoul: Sallim, 2005)
- Evolution of Storytelling (Hainaim, 2014)

=== Works in other areas ===
- Scenario for Installation Art <Les Chiens d'Ascalon>, Jeu de Paume (2000)
- Script for Ballet <Shinsi 21> (2001)
- Script for Opera <Superman with Many Tears> (2002)
- Scenario for 3D animation <Dream of Cheonma> (2003)
- Story Director for MMORPG Guild Wars (2005)
- Scenario for movie <청연(Blue Swallow)>(2005)
- Scenario for 3D animation <Sand Storm Captain Cha-Cha> (2005)
- Scenario for 3D animation <Fire of Phoenix- Adventure of Thu-Thu> (2006)

=== Storyhelper ===
Yi and his team under the support of NCSOFT developed a scenario writing-helping software called 'Storyhelper' (2013). Its concept is similar to existing software such as Dramatica. The programs helps writers design the stories and examine how they are similar to existing stories. Storyhelper has accumulated and analyzed existing stories into 205 motives and about 120,000 factors from 1406 movies. Regarding the criticism of Storyhelper invading the writer's ability of being creative their own story, Yi explained that Storyhelper could not create the whole story for you, it just rather helps writers to design and conceive their stories in the first place.

== Awards ==
- The First Writer's World Literature Award, Saegaesa, 1992
- Today's Young Scholarship Award, Korean Government, 1995
- The First China-Korea Youth Scholarship Award, Chinese Government, 1995
- The 24th Yi Sang Literary Award, Munhak Sasangsa, 2000
- 21st Century Literary Award, Isu group, 2001
- Certificate of Award from Minister of Information and Communication for contribution to IT industry, 2003
