= Yi Hocheol =

South Korean writer (1932–2016)

- 이호철
- Born: 15 March 1932; Genzan, Kankyōnan, Chōsen, Empire of Japan (present-day Wonsan, Kangwon, North Korea)
- Died: 18 September 2016 (aged 84)
- Writing career
- Language: Korean

Korean name
- Hangul: 이호철
- Hanja: 李浩哲
- RR: I Hocheol
- MR: I Hoch'ŏl

Yi Hocheol (Korean: 이호철; 15 March 1932 – 18 September 2016), also romanized as Lee Hochul, was a South Korean writer who won several awards.

Following his death, the Lee Hochul Literary Prize for Peace was established after him.

== Life ==
Yi Hocheol was born on 15 March 1932 in Wonsan, then named Genzan and located in Kankyōnan Province under Japanese rule, and lived through the tragedy of the ideological conflict in Korea. His father refused to cooperate with Northern communists, so his family had their property confiscated, and were chased out of their hometown. During the war, Yi Hocheol was drafted into the North Korean army and sent to the front in the South. He eventually rejoined his family in his native town, but ultimately decided to move to South Korea by himself. A prolific writer as well as an activist, he participated in the pro-democracy movement against the dictatorial regime of President Park Chung-hee, and spent most of the 1970s in prison. In the 1980s, after the army general Chun Doo-hwan gained power through a coup d'état, Yi Hocheol continued to battle against the military dictatorship despite increasing government persecution, and became actively involved in organizations such as the Association of Writers for Literature of Freedom and Practice (Jayu silcheon munin hyeobuihoe). He died in September 2016 from a brain tumor at the age of 84.

== Work ==
Yi Hocheol made his literary debut in 1955 with the story Leaving Home (탈향), and was known for directly confronting and describing reality. His early works explored the emotional toll of the Korean War on individuals and illuminated the conflict between those who benefited from the war and those ruined by it. National Division also became one of his themes and “Panmunjeom” (Panmunjeom, 1961), a story of a South Korean reporter's visit to the DMZ and his brief but warm encounter with a female reporter from the North, is one of his most famous stories. "Northerners, Southerners" (Namnyeok salam bugnyeok salam), similarly, focused on issues of the split from the perspective of a young Korean soldier. Yi Hocheol was also interested in the effects of economic success, sometimes writing about the petite bourgeoisie's becoming hardened by hollow values and the pursuit of money.

== Works in Translation ==
- Panmunjom (판문점)
- Panmunjom and Other Stories (이호철 소설집)
- Southerners, Northerners (남녘 사람 북녘 사람)
- Heimatlos (소슬한 밤의 이야기; 탈향)
- Kleine Leute (소시민)
- Koreanische Erzählungen (한국단편선)
- Menschen aus dem Norden Menschen (남녘 사람 북녘 사람)
- Сезон Дождей (한국단편소설선 2권)
- El ciudadano pequeño (소시민)
- 板門店 (이호철 단편선)
- 脱乡-李浩哲短篇小说集 (이호철 단편선집)
- 南边的人北边的人 (남녘 사람 북녘 사람)
- Północ - Południe (남녘 사람 북녘 사람)
- Gens du Sud, gens du Nord (남녘 사람 북녘 사람)
- La Vallée vide (이호철 단편선)
- Déliek, északiak (남녘 사람 북녘 사람)

== Works in Korean (Partial) ==
=== Short story collections ===
- The Statue of a Nude (Nasang, 1961)
- Big Mountain (Keun san, 1972)
- Wearing Thin (1975)
- The Heretic (1976)
- Death in 1970 (1970 nyeonui jugeum, 1977),
- The Sound of the Night Wind (Bam baram sori, 1980)
- The Gate (1981)
- People Who Crossed Over to the South (Wollamhan saramdeul, 1981)

=== Novels ===
- Petit Bourgeois (Sosimin, 1964)
- Seoul Is Full (Seoureun manwonida, 1966)
- Entertaining World (Jaemi inneun sesang, 1970)
- The Deep Valley of That Winter (1978)
- Northerners, Southerners (Namnyeok salam bugnyeok salam, 1996)

== Awards ==
- 1962: Contemporary Literature (Hyundae Munhak) Award
- 1962: Dong-in Literary Award
- 1989: Korean Literature Award
- 2012: Samil Prize
