= Seo Jeong-in =

South Korean writer (1936–2025)

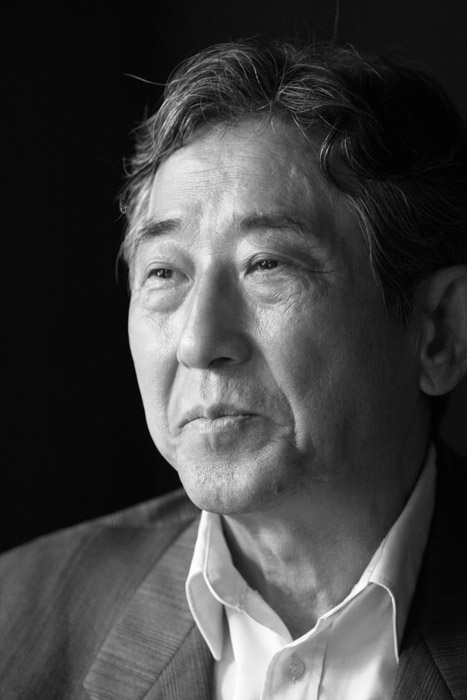
- Born: December 20, 1936; Suncheon, Korea, Empire of Japan
- Died: April 14, 2025 (aged 88)
- Writing career
- Language: Korean

Korean name
- Hangul: 서정인
- Hanja: 徐廷仁
- RR: Seo Jeongin
- MR: Sŏ Chŏngin

Seo Jeong-in (Korean: 서정인; December 20, 1936 – April 14, 2025) was a South Korean writer.

== Background ==
Seo Jeong-in was born December 20, 1936, in Suncheon, Jeollanam-do. He obtained undergraduate and graduate degrees in English Literature from Seoul National University, and made his literary debut in 1962 when "Transferred to the Rear" was awarded the New Writer's Prize given by The World of Thoughts (Sasanggye) magazine. He also worked as a professor of English at Chonbuk National University. Seo died on April 14, 2025, at the age of 88.

== Work ==
Seo used his fiction for social critique, sometimes experimenting with formal genres to show the shoddy basis of modern life. He debuted with "Evacuation", a story revolving around existential angst towards the military and the medical condition Meniere's syndrome. In Labyrinth he depicts how free exploration of paths in life can become closed down. These early works are heavily existential, and focus on issues of human existence within the confines of coarse daily life. The best work of his classical phase, when he was consciously working on the formal aesthetics of the short story is A River. This story recounts the predictable beats of a pointless and lonely life in a world that denies the dream of beauty.

Though diverse in subject matter, Lee's works share the underlying concern with growing insensitivity to violence and change in modern society and our indifference to the suffering of others. Over the years, however, the sharply critical tone of his works grew relatively mild. The Color of Water, the Pattern of That Shade published in 1996 marks a point of change in the author's perspective from cold and analytical to warm and compassionate. The Color of Water, the Pattern of That Shade is a moving story of family hardships and maternal love which also explores the negative side-effects of rapid industrialization.

== Works in translation ==
- Défilé (분열식)

== Works in Korean (partial) ==
=== Short stories ===
- "Our Neighborhood" (Uri dongne, 1971)
- "The Road to Geumsan Temple" (Geumsansa ganeun gil, 1974)
- "In the Heart of Nammun" (Nammun tong, 1975)
- "Scissors/ Nightmare" (Gawi, 1976)
- "Winter's Wanderer" (Gyeoul nageune, 1976)
- "The Appointment" (Yaksok, 1976), "An Outing" (Nadeuri, 1977)
- "The Shade of a Pavilion" (Jeongja geuneul, 1977)
- "Between Saturday and Friday" (Toyoilgwa geumyoil sai, 1980)

Narrative Experiments

- The Festival of Rhododendrons (1986)
- The Moon Bow

=== Short story collections ===
- The River (1976)
- Scissors/ Nightmare (1977)
- Between Saturday and Friday (1980)
- The Field (Beolpan, 1984).

== Awards ==
- Woltan Literature Prize (1983)
- Dongseo Literature Prize (1995)
- Kim Dong-ri Literature Prize (1998)
