= List of Seoul National University people =

The following is a list of notable people associated with Seoul National University, located in Gwanak, Seoul, South Korea.

== Notable alumni and faculty ==
=== Academia ===
- Chang Ha-joon (B.A. Economics), economist; former Consultant to the World Bank
- Cho Kah-kyung (B.A.), Korean-American philosopher
- Choe Jong-gil, Professor of Law, tortured and murdered by KCIA.
- Choi Soon-ja (M.A. French language and literature), linguist
- Wonyong Choi (B.S. Engineering), environmental scientist, engineer, and academic
- Choi Yang-do (B.S. Agricultural Chemistry), agricultural biotechnologist; professor at Seoul National University (College of Agriculture)
- Jim Nam Choi (B.A. Psychology), professor of Organizational Behavior and Human Resource Management at the Graduate School of Business of Seoul National University
- T. J. Chung, professor mechanical and aerospace engineering at the University of Alabama in Huntsville
- Huh June-e (B.S. physics and M.Sc. Mathematics), Fields Medalist
- Kim Joo-myeong (B.S., M.S. Microbiology), Korean-American biological scientist
- Kim Sung-hou (B.S. & M.S. Chemistry), Korean-American structural biologist and biophysicist; member of the National Academy of Sciences
- Kim Vic-narry (B.A., M.Sc. Microbiology), biochemist and microbiologist; professor at Seoul National University and Director of the Center for RNA Research, Institute for Basic Science
- Kang-tae Kim (M.Sc. Mathematics), mathematician; professor at Pohang University of Science and Technology
- Kim Won-yong (B.A.), known for pioneer in South Korean archaeology; former professor at Seoul National University College of Humanities, awarded Distinguished SNU Members in 1993
- Lee Ki-baek (B.A.), historian
- Lee Kyoung-jun (M.A. Public Administration, Ph.D.), management professor; professor at Kyung Hee University (College of Management)
- Heui Jae Pahk (B.S. and M.S.), SNU-HD Infra-core Endowed Professor at Seoul National University
- Park Jong-sei (B.S. Chemistry), chemistry researcher and government official; former head of the Korea Institute of Science and Technology's Applied Sciences Division and Chairman of the Food and Drug Administration from 1998–1999
- Namgi Park (M.A. Educational Administration)
- Park Yung-woo (B.S. Physics), professor at Seoul National University
- Rieh Sun-Young (B.S. Engineering, M.S., Engineering) architect and professor
- Son Bong-ho (B.A.), Christian ethics scholar and social activist; former president of Hansung University and of Dongduk Women's University
- Yang Won-sik (Ph.D.), orthodontist; former Director of the Department of Orthodontics, Dental Hospital, Seoul National University

=== Entertainment ===
- Bang Si-hyuk (B.A. Aesthetics), songwriter, producer and business executive; founder of HYBE Corporation
- Lim Sung-bin (stage name Beenzino), (B.F.A. Sculpture), rapper and music producer
- Chang Kiha (B.A. Sociology), singer-songwriter
- Chyung Eun-ju (B.A. double major in Business Administration and Spanish), Miss World Korea, model and broadcaster
- Ha Do-kwon (B.M. Vocal Music), actor
- Hwang Dong-hyuk (B.A. Communications), film director and screenwriter; creator of the 2021 Netflix series Squid Game. Emmy Awards winner.
- Jang Sun-woo (B.A. Anthropology), film director
- Jo Sung-hee (B.A. Industrial Design), film director
- Jo Yun-suk (stage name Lucid Fall), (B.S. Chemical Engineering), singer-songwriter and former nanotechnology researcher
- Jung Jin-young (B.A. Korean Language and Literature), actor
- Jung Ki-yeol (stage name Kai), (B.F.A. Voice), singer and musical theatre actor
- Kam Woo-sung (B.A. Oriental Painting), actor
- Kim Chang-wan (B.S. Agricultural Studies), actor and rock singer
- Kim Eui-sung (B.B.A.), actor
- Kim Hye-eun (B.M. Voice), actress
- Kim Jeong-hoon, actor and singer
- Kim Jin-tae (stage name Verbal Jint), (B.A. Economics), rapper, lyricist and record producer
- Kim Ki-young (Bachelor of Stomatology), film director
- Kim Myung-gon (B.A. German Language Education), actor, screenwriter and music director
- Kim Shin-rok (B.A. Geography), actress
- Kim So-hyun (B.M. Voice), musical theatre actress
- Kim Sung-min (B.S. Physical and Social Education), actor
- Kim Tae-hee (B.A. Fashion Design), actress
- Lee Byung-hoon (B.S. Forestry), television director and producer
- Lee Juck (B.A. Sociology), singer-songwriter
- Lee Hanee (B.M. Korean Music & M.M.), actress, model, classical musician and Miss Universe 2007 3rd runner-up
- Lee Sang-yoon (B.S. Physics), actor
- Lee Soo-man (B.Eng.), business executive and music producer; founder of SM Entertainment
- Lee Soon-jae (B.Phil.), actor
- Min Kyu-dong (B.A. Economics), film director, screenwriter and producer
- Seo Jung-hack (B.M. Voice), singer
- Shin Young-kyun (Bachelor of Stomatology), actor, film producer and politician
- You Hee-yeol (B.M. Composition), singer-songwriter and TV host
- Shin Seul-ki (B.M. Piano), actress

=== Literature, arts and culture ===
- Chin Un-suk (B.M. Composition), composer, Arnold Schönberg Prize 2005
- Chung So-sung (B.A., M.A. French Literature), author; winner of the 17th Dong-in Literary Award
- Gum Nanse (B.M. Composition), conductor
- Han Terra (B.A., M.A. and Ph.D.), inventor, composer, gayageum virtuoso and polymath
- Hyun Ki-young (B.A.), author; former President of the Korean Arts & Culture Foundation
- Hwang Byung-ki (LL.B.), gayageum player and composer
- Jo Su-mi, soprano; Grammy Award winner
- Kim Chi-ha (B.A. Aesthetics), poet and playwright
- Kim Ji-hoon (B.M.), opera singer; principal of The Royal Opera
- Kim Seong-tae (B.M. Composition) composer; professor at Seoul National University (College of Music)
- Kim Seungok (B.A. French Literature), novelist and screenwriter
- Kim Swoo-geun (B.Arch.), architect, educator and publisher
- Kim Tschoon-su (B.F.A.), painter; professor at Seoul National University (College of Fine Arts)
- Kim Yong-jun (art critic), painter and critic, faculty member 1946-48
- Lee O-young (B.A., M.A. Korean Literature), critic and novelist; professor emeritus of Ewha Womans University and former professor at Dankook University
- Lee Yangji (B.A.), Zainichi-Korean novelist; winner of the 1988 Akutagawa Prize
- Oh Jung-geun (B.F.A.), painter
- Park Young-hi (B.M.), composer; professor at the University of the Arts Bremen
- Park Wan-suh, writer
- Pi Chun-deuk, famous South Korean essay author, awarded Distinguished SNU Members in 1999
- Do Ho Suh (B.F.A and M.F.A. Oriental Painting), sculptor and installation artist
- Shon Hwayoung (B.A Music) gayageum performer and composer
- Suh Yong-sun (B.F.A.), painter and sculptor; former professor at Seoul National University (College of Fine Arts)
- Yi In-seong (B.A., M.A. French Literature), modern novelist

=== Medicine ===
- Chang Kee-ryo (M.D.), famous doctor as philanthropist in South Korea, awarded Distinguished SNU Members in 1992.
- Suh Yoo-hun (M.D., Ph.D. in medicine and pharmacology), neuroscientist; professor at Seoul National University (College of Medicine)
- Yoon Bo-hyun (M.D., Ph.D.), physician and researcher in obstetrics and gynecology; professor at Seoul National University (College of Medicine)

=== Public service ===
- Ahn Cheol-soo (M.D., M.S. and Ph.D. Physiology), doctor of medicine, physician, programmer, entrepreneur, professor, politician; founder of AhnLab Inc. and former Dean of the Graduate School of Convergence Science and Technology (Seoul National University)
- Ban Ki-moon (B.A. International Relations), politician and diplomat; the 8th UN Secretary-General
- Chang Wook-jin (B.A. Anthropology), Diplomat, Chief of NGO Branch of the United Nations
- Cho Byoung-se (B.A. Public Policy Making), former Senior Secretary to the Prime Minister of South Korea and professor
- Cho Kuk (LL.B., LL.M.), former Senior Secretary to the President for Civil Affairs (2017-2019), former South Korea Minister of Justice
- Kang Hyun-wook (B.A. Foreign Studies), politician; former Governor of North Jeolla Province, Minister of Agriculture, Forestry and Fisheries (1992–1993), and Minister of the Environment (1996–1997)
- Lee Hyun-jae (B.A.), politician; Chairman of the Ho-Am Prize Committee and South Korea's 18th Prime Minister
- Lee Tai-young (LL.B), first female lawyer in South Korea, awarded Distinguished SNU Members in 1991
- Kim Sang-gon (B.A., M.A. and Ph.D Business Administration), former Minister of Education and Deputy Prime Minister of South Korea
- Kim Wan-ju (B.A. Political Science & M.A. Public Administration), politician; the 32nd Governor of North Jeolla Province and former mayor of Jeonju City
- Kim Young-sam (B.A. Philosophy), politician and activist; the 14th President of the Republic of Korea
- Yoo Seong-min (B.A. Economics), economist and politician; former House leader of Saenuri party and MP for Daegu Dong A Parliamentary Constituency.
- Yoon Suk Yeol (LL.B., LL.M.), Prosecutor General of South Korea; 13th President of South Korea
- Yu Myung-hwan (B.A. Public Administration), diplomat; former Minister of Foreign Affairs and Trade

=== Social movement ===
- Lee Hee-ho (B.A. Education) renowned feminism activist in South Korea, awarded Distinguished SNU Members in 2000
