= Steven G. Krantz =

American mathematician

Steven George Krantz
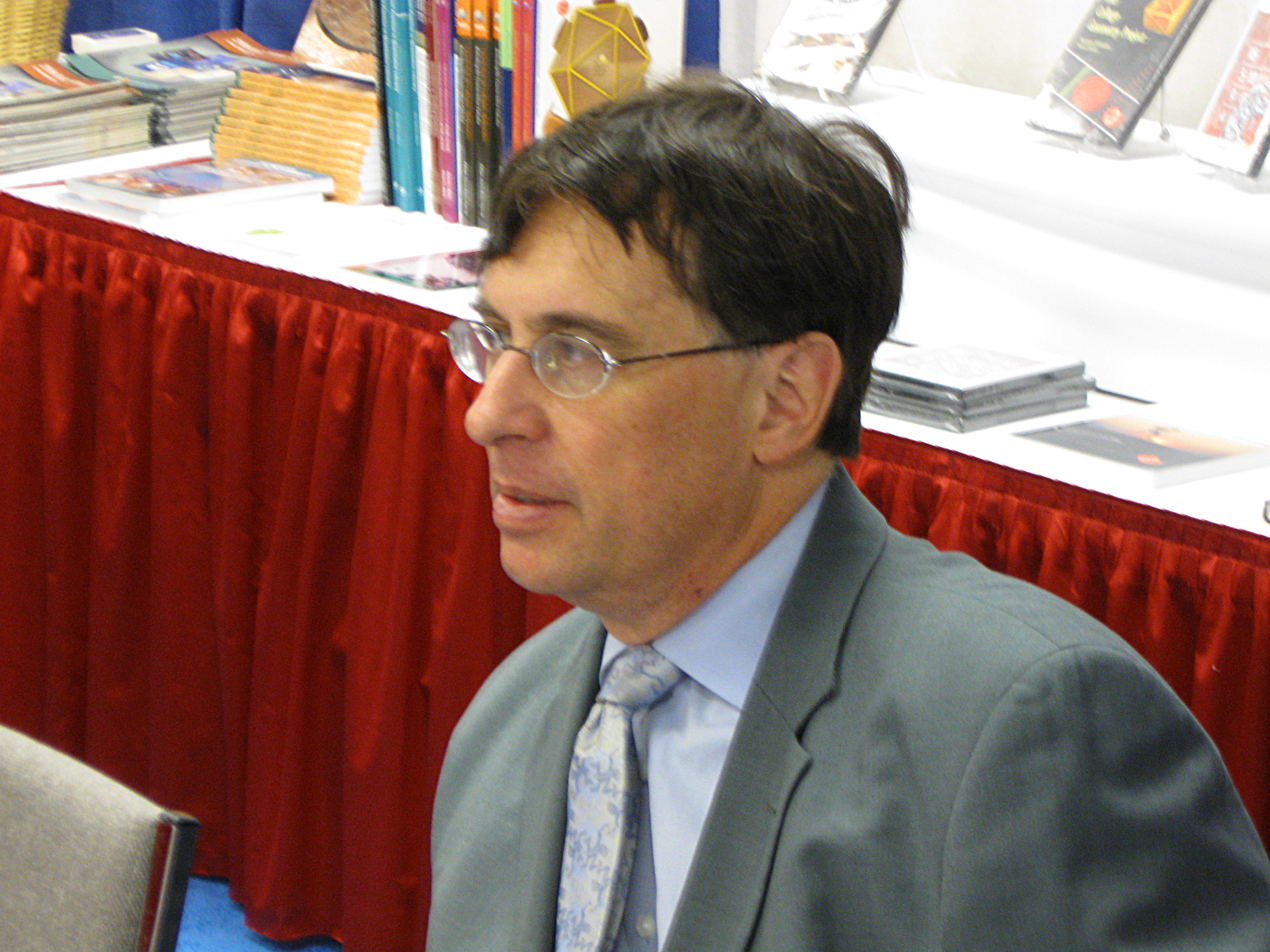
- Steven G. Krantz in 2009
- Born: February 3, 1951 (age 75); San Francisco, California, US
- Education: University of California, Santa Cruz; Princeton University
- Spouse: Randi D. Ruden (m. 1974)
- Awards: Chauvenet Prize (1992)
- Scientific career
- Workplaces: University of California, Los Angeles; Princeton University; Pennsylvania State University; Washington University in St. Louis
- Doctoral advisor: Elias M. Stein, Joseph J. Kohn

Steven George Krantz (born February 3, 1951) is an American scholar, mathematician, and writer. Krantz is Professor Emeritus of Mathematics at Washington University in St. Louis. He has authored more than 350 research papers and published more than 150 books. Additionally, Krantz has edited journals such as the Notices of the American Mathematical Society and The Journal of Geometric Analysis.

== Early life and education ==
Steven Krantz grew up in Redwood City, California and graduated from Sequoia High School in class of 1967.

Krantz was an undergraduate at the University of California, Santa Cruz (UCSC). Krantz obtained his Ph.D. in mathematics from Princeton University in 1974 under the direction of Elias M. Stein and Joseph J. Kohn.

== Biography ==
Among Krantz's research interests include: several complex variables, harmonic analysis, partial differential equations, differential geometry, interpolation of operators, Lie theory, smoothness of functions, convexity theory, the corona problem, the inner functions problem, Fourier analysis, singular integrals, Lusin area integrals, Lipschitz spaces, finite difference operators, Hardy spaces, functions of bounded mean oscillation, geometric measure theory, sets of positive reach, the implicit function theorem, approximation theory, real analytic functions, analysis on the Heisenberg group, complex function theory, and real analysis.

He applied wavelet analysis to plastic surgery, creating software for facial recognition. Krantz has also written software for the pharmaceutical industry.

Krantz has worked on the inhomogeneous Cauchy–Riemann equations (he obtained the first sharp estimates in a variety of nonisotropic norms), on separate smoothness of functions (most notably with hypotheses about smoothness along integral curves of vector fields), on analysis on the Heisenberg group and other nilpotent Lie groups, on harmonic analysis in several complex variables, on the function theory of several complex variables, on the harmonic analysis of several real variables, on partial differential equations, on complex geometry, on the automorphism groups of domains in complex space, and on the geometry of complex domains. He has worked with Siqi Fu, Robert E. Greene, Alexander Isaev and Kang-Tae Kim on the Bergman kernel, the Bergman metric, and automorphism groups of domains; with Song-Ying Li on the harmonic analysis of several complex variables; and with Marco Peloso on harmonic analysis, the inhomogeneous Cauchy–Riemann equations, Hodge theory, and the analysis of the worm domain. Krantz's book on the geometry of complex domains, written jointly with Robert E. Greene and Kang-Tae Kim, appeared in 2011.

Krantz's monographs include Function Theory of Several Complex Variables, Complex Analysis: The Geometric Viewpoint, A Primer of Real Analytic Functions (joint with Harold R. Parks), The Implicit Function Theorem (joint with Harold Parks), Geometric Integration Theory (joint with Harold Parks), and The Geometry of Complex Domains (joint with Kang-Tae Kim and Robert E. Greene). His book The Proof is in the Pudding: A Look at the Changing Nature of Mathematical Proof looks at the history and evolving nature of the proof concept. Krantz's latest book, A Mathematician Comes of Age, published by the Mathematical Association of America, is an exploration of the concept of mathematical maturity.

Krantz is author of textbooks and popular books. His books Mathematical Apocrypha and Mathematical Apocrypha Redux are collections of anecdotes about famous mathematicians. Krantz's book An Episodic History of Mathematics: Mathematical Culture through Problem Solving is a blend of history and problem solving. A Mathematician's Survival Guide and The Survival of a Mathematician are about how to get into the mathematics profession and how to survive in the mathematics profession. Krantz's new book with Harold R. Parks titled A Mathematical Odyssey: Journey from the Real to the Complex is an entree to mathematics for the layman. His book I, Mathematician (joint with Peter Casazza and Randi D. Ruden) is a study, with contributions from many mathematicians, of how mathematicians think of themselves and how others think of mathematicians. The book The Theory and Practice of Conformal Geometry is a study of classical conformal geometry in the complex plane, and is the first Dover book that is not a reprint of a classic but is instead a new book.

Krantz has had 9 Masters students and 20 Ph.D. students. Among the latter are Xiaojun Huang (holder of the Bergman Prize), Marco Peloso, Fausto Di Biase, Daowei Ma (professor at Wichita State University), and Siqi Fu (distinguished professor at Rutgers University–Camden).

Krantz has organized conferences, including the Summer Workshop in Several Complex Variables held in Santa Cruz in 1989 and attended by 250 people. He was the principal lecturer at a CBMS conference at George Mason University in 1992. He organized and spoke at a conference on the corona problem held at the Fields Institute in Toronto, Canada in June 2012.

In 2012 he became a Fellow of the American Mathematical Society. Krantz has an Erdős number of 1.

Krantz has collaborated with Arni S. R. Rao of Augusta University to study the COVID-19 pandemic. They have more than twenty papers and book chapters as well as several virtual seminars on the topic.

=== Teaching ===
Krantz has taught at University of California, Los Angeles, Princeton University, Pennsylvania State University, and Washington University in St. Louis, where he served as chair of the mathematics department.

He has been a visiting faculty member at the Institute for Advanced Study, Princeton, the University of Paris, the Universidad Autónoma de Madrid, Pohang University of Science and Technology, the Mathematical Sciences Research Institute, the American Institute of Mathematics, Australian National University (as the Richardson Fellow), Texas A&M (as the Frontiers Lecturer), the University of Umeå, Uppsala University, the University of Oslo, Politecnico Torino, the University of Seoul, Université Paul Sabatier, and Beijing University.

=== Editor ===
Krantz was editor-in-chief of the Notices of the American Mathematical Society for 2010 through 2015. Krantz is also editor-in-chief of the Journal of Mathematical Analysis and Applications and managing editor and founder of the Journal of Geometric Analysis. He also edits for The American Mathematical Monthly, Complex Variables and Elliptic Equations, and The Bulletin of the American Mathematical Society. Krantz is editor-in-chief of the new Springer journal titled Complex Analysis and its Synergies.

== Awards and recognitions ==
- Distinguished Teaching Award, UCLA Alumni Association, 1979
- Chauvenet Prize of the MAA, 1992
- Beckenbach Book Prize of the MAA, 1994
- Outstanding Academic Book Award, Current Review for Academic Libraries, 1998
- Sequoia High School Hall of Fame inductee, 2009
- Listed in Who's Who and American Men and Women of Science
- Fellow of the American Mathematical Society, 2012

== Selected publications ==
Krantz has published more than 350 scholarly articles and 160 books.

- Krantz, Steven G. (1980), "Holomorphic functions of bounded mean oscillation and mapping properties of the Szegő projection.", Duke Mathematical Journal, 47 (4): 743–761, doi:10.1215/S0012-7094-80-04744-4
- Krantz, Steven G.; Greene, Robert (1982), "Deformations of complex structure, estimates for the Cauchy–Riemann equations, and stability of the Bergman kernel.", Advances in Mathematics, 43: 1–86, doi:10.1016/0001-8708(82)90028-7
- Krantz, Steven G.; Burns, Daniel (1994), "Rigidity of holomorphic mappings and a new Schwarz lemma at the boundary.", Journal of the American Mathematical Society, 7 (3): 661–676, doi:10.2307/2152787, JSTOR 2152787
- Krantz, Steven G.; Kim, Kang-Tae (2008), "Complex scaling and geometric analysis of several variables.", Bulletin of the Korean Mathematical Society, 45 (3): 523–561, arXiv:math/0610710, doi:10.4134/bkms.2008.45.3.523, S2CID 14078303
- Freshman Calculus (with Bonic, Robert A., and Cranford, Estelle) (D. C. Heath, 1971, ISBN 0669520500)
- Calculus: Single and Multivariable (with Blank, Brian E.) (2nd ed., John Wiley and Sons, 2011, ISBN 0470453605)
- Function Theory of Several Complex Variables (2nd ed., American Mathematical Society, 2001, ISBN 0-8218-2724-3)
- Function Theory of One Complex Variable (with Greene, Robert E.) (3rd ed., American Mathematical Society, 2006, ISBN 0821839624)
- Complex Analysis: The Geometric Viewpoint (2nd ed., Mathematical Association of America, 2004, ISBN 0-88385-035-4)
- A Primer of Real Analytic Functions (with Parks, Harold R.) (2nd ed., Birkhäuser Publishing, 2002, ISBN 0-8176-4264-1)
- The Implicit Function Theorem: History, Theory, and Applications (with Parks, Harold R.) (Birkhäuser Publishing, 2002, ISBN 0-8176-4285-4)
- A Panorama of Harmonic Analysis (Mathematical Association of America, 1999, ISBN 0-88385-031-1)
- A Mathematician's Survival Guide (American Mathematical Society, 2003, ISBN 0-8218-3455-X)
- The Survival of a Mathematician (American Mathematical Society, 2008, ISBN 0-8218-4629-9)
- Mathematical Apocrypha (Mathematical Association of America, 2002, ISBN 0-88385-539-9)
- Mathematical Apocrypha Redux (Mathematical Association of America, 2005, ISBN 0-88385-554-2)
- Geometric Integration Theory (with Parks, Harold R.) (Birkhauser, 2008, ISBN 0-8176-4676-0)
- The Proof is in the Pudding: The Changing Nature of Mathematical Proof (Springer, 2011, ISBN 0-387-48908-8)
- The Geometry of Complex Domains (with Greene, Robert E. and Kim, Kang-Tae) (Birkhauser, 2011, ISBN 0-8176-4139-4)
- A Mathematician Comes of Age (Mathematical Association of America, 2011, ISBN 0-88385-578-X)
- Elements of Advanced Mathematics, 3rd ed. (Taylor & Francis/CRC Press, 2012, ISBN 978-1439898345)
- Real Analysis and Foundations, 2nd ed. (Taylor & Francis/CRC Press, 2004, ISBN 978-1584884835)
- A TeX Primer for Scientists (with Stanley Sawyer) (Taylor & Francis/CRC Press, 1995, ISBN 978-0849371592)
- A Handbook of Typography for the Mathematical Sciences (Taylor & Francis/CRC Press, 2000, ISBN 978-1584881490)
- Geometric Analysis of the Bergman Kernel and Metric (Springer, 2013, ISBN 978-1-4614-7923-9)
- How to Teach Mathematics: Third Edition (American Math Society, 2015)
- The Theory and Practice of Conformal Geometry (Dover Publishing, 2015)
- I, Mathematician, I (with Peter Casazza and Randi D. Ruden) (Mathematical Association of America, 2015)
- I, Mathematician, II (with Peter Casazza and Randi D. Ruden) (COMAP, 2016)
- A Primer of Mathematical Writing, 2nd edition (American Mathematical Society, 2017)
- Harmonic and Complex Analysis in Several Variables (Springer, 2017, ISBN 978-3-319-63229-2)
- Geometric Analysis of the Bergman Kernel and Metric (Birkhauser, 2013)
- A Guide to Functional Analysis (Mathematical Association of America, 2013)
- Foundations of Real Analysis (Taylor & Francis/CRC Press, 2013)
- Convex Analysis (Taylor & Francis, 2015)
- Essentials of Mathematical Thinking (Taylor & Francis, 2017)
- Handbook of Complex Analysis (Taylor & Francis, 2017)
- Transition to Analysis with Proof (Taylor & Francis, 2017)
- Elementary Introduction to the Lebesgue Integral (Taylor & Francis, 2018)
- An Episodic History of Mathematics: Mathematical Culture through Problem Solving (Mathematical Association of America, 2010)
