= Pil Joong Lee =

South Korean cryptographer

Pil Joong Lee (Korean: 이필중) is a cryptographer at Pohang University of Science and Technology (POSTECH), South Korea.

Lee earned his B.S. and M.S. from the Seoul National University (Seoul, South Korea) in 1974 and 1977, respectively, and then later his Ph.D. from UCLA (Los Angeles, California, United States) in 1985.
