= Ku Ponung =

Korean modernist painter

Ku Ponung (Korean: 구본웅; Hanja: 具本雄; 1906 – 1953) was a Korean modernist painter associated with Fauvism.

== Early life and education ==
Ku Ponung was born in 1906 to a wealthy family. He attended Gyeongsin High School and Goryeo Art school. During this period, he studied under Ko Hui Dong, the first Korean Western style oil painter, and Na Hye-Sok, a korean feminist poet and artist. He then moved to Japan to continue his education in the Art Department of Nihon University and the Pacific Art school, located in Tokyo. Nihon University had a less strictly academic approach to art education than other institutions. it provided a broader liberal arts education and attracted a more stylistically and ideologically diverse student body.

== Career ==
After completing his studies in Japan, Ku Ponung moved back to Korea. He was part of an emerging social scene of artists dissatisfied with the strict academic style mandated by the Joseon Art Exhibition, the major Korean Exhinition, sponsored by the colonial Japanese government. The forum for this emergent culture were the coffee houses in Seoul which sought to emulate Parisian coffee houses and salons. These establishments played western Jazz and classical music and hosted art exhibitions. They were a central meeting place for artists are writers to exchange ideas and support each other's work.

Ku Ponung's first exhibited works were part of a larger exhibition in a coffeehouse in 1931. His first solo exhibition took place in June 1931 in the Dong A Ilbo newspaper building in Seoul. It contained 50 works completed in Tokyo. There was minimal reaction to this exhibition, except from critic Kim Yoong Jun who claimed that society was too "immature" to appreciate Ku's work. His second solo exhibition took place in the coffee house Bon Ami in 1933. By this time he was involved with an association of artists called Mogile. Their work was described as dangerous, unstable, and decadent.

His most well known work is entitled Portrait of a Friend, it is a portrait of his close friend and classmate, the poet and writer Yi Sang.

Ku's work incorporated the visual language of Matisse, Cézanne, analytic cubism, and expressionism, while exploring ideas like the modern girl and various other aspects of Korean identity. Grappling with the issues of Korean identity post-liberation, he is quoted as having said "I spent my entire artistic career in a net of Japanese influence… I even had to ask what Korean influence meant."

Ku Ponung had a publishing house called Changmunsa, established in 1923. Through Changmunsa he published Yi Sang's writing.

Later in life, he worked with the Ministry of Education of the United States Army Military Government in Korea and created one of the first art books for school children as part of his association with it.

== Legacy and death ==
Ku Ponung has been remembered as significant figure in the history of Korean contemporary art. MMCA exhibited Portrait of a Friend in 2021 in an exhibition entitled "Encounters Between Korean Art and Literature in the Modern Age”. Ku Ponung died in 1953 during the Korean War. Most of his paintings were lost or destroyed.
