= Heui Jae Pahk =

South Korean engineer (born 1961)

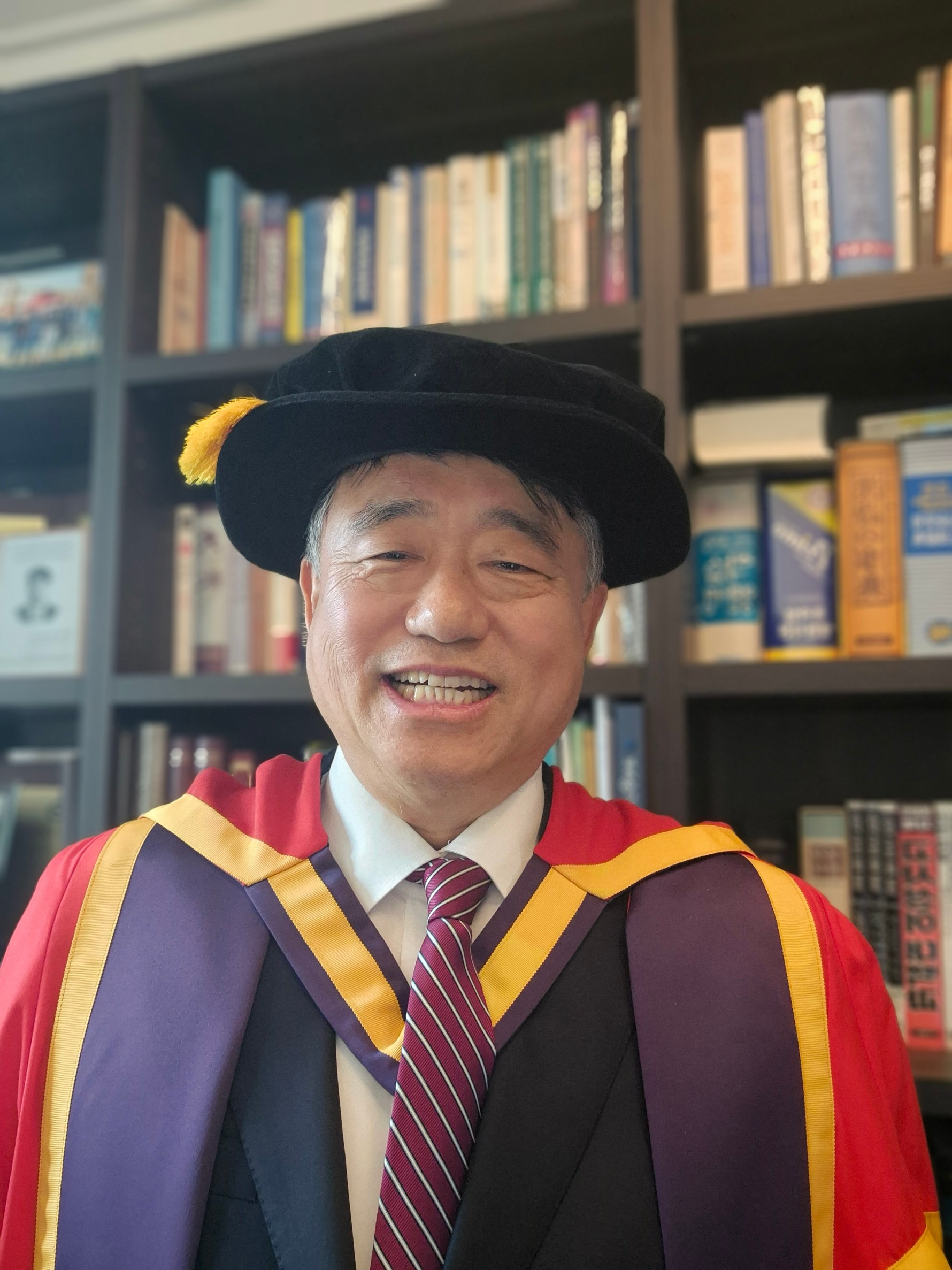
- Pahk in 2026
- Born: 1961 (age 64–65)
- Occupations: Engineer, academic and entrepreneur

Academic background
- Education: B.S., Mechanical Design and Production Engineering; M.S., Mechanical Design and Production Engineering; Ph.D., Mechanical Engineering; D.Eng., Mechanical Engineering
- Alma mater: Seoul National University; University of Manchester,UK

Heui Jae Pahk (Korean: 박희재; born 1961) is an engineer, academic, and entrepreneur. He is a full professor of mechanical engineering and an SNU-HD Infra-core Endowed Professor at Seoul National University.

Pahk's research is centered on engineering, where he has worked on advanced manufacturing, precision engineering, metrology, mechatronics, and ultraprecision measurement systems. He is a recipient of the Order of Industrial Merit from the President of the Republic of Korea in 2004 and the IR52 Jang Young Sil Awards from the Korean Minister of Science and Technology in 2005 and 2013.

== Education ==
Pahk completed his Bachelor's and Master's in Mechanical Design and Production Engineering at Seoul National University in 1983 and 1985, respectively. Following this, he completed his Ph.D. in 1990 and subsequently a D.Eng. from the University of Manchester in 2019.

== Career ==
Pahk's career began as an assistant professor at the Pohang University of Science and Technology from 1991 to 1993. Afterwards, he joined the Seoul National University, where he was appointed assistant professor in 1993, later becoming associate professor in 1997 and full professor in 2002. In 2022, he was appointed an SNU-HD Infra-core Endowed Professor. He has also held administrative roles at Seoul National University, where he founded SNU Precision, and was its CEO until 2017. Since 2000, he has been director of the Industry-University Research Center, and since 2020, has been the chief of the AI Valley Bureau and director of the Institute of Advanced Machinery.

Pahk was the National CTO and the president of the Office of Strategic R&D Planning of the Korean Government from 2013 to 2017. He established the Pahk Heui Jae Creative Space (박희재 창의공간), and has also donated stocks to the College of Engineering at SNU.

== Research ==
Pahk's research and patents center on advanced manufacturing, particularly precision engineering, metrology, mechatronics, and ultraprecision measurement systems. His work has addressed ultra-precision positioning, and has contributed to the development of high-accuracy positioning systems, techniques for assessing volumetric and parametric errors in multi-axis machines, and measurement approaches that improve thin-film thickness estimation through combined interferometric and spectroscopic analysis. His research has also extended to modeling thermal errors in machine spindles and designing micro-positioning stages and hybrid vibration-isolation systems.

In optical and measurement science, Pahk has developed methods that integrate interferometry and reflectometry for improved characterization of thin films and surface profiles, as well as approaches that enhance depth measurement accuracy in white-light interferometry. He has created inspection systems for semiconductor structures such as through-silicon vias and designed imaging frameworks that simplify defect detection through coordinated multi-camera acquisition. He commercialized and along with his team, developed an in-line measurement technology capable of characterizing extremely fine three-dimensional features across large-area TFT-LCDs with nanometer-level precision.

== Awards and honors ==
- 2004 – Order of Industrial Merit, President of the Republic of Korea
- 2005 – IR52 Jang Young Sil Award, Minister of Science and Technology
- 2008 – Certificate of World Top Class Products, Minister of Industry & Energy
- 2013 – IR52 Jang Young Sil Award, Minister of Science and Technology
- 2014 – Global CEO Award, Forbes Korea
- 2014 – Full Member, National Academy of Engineering of Korea
- 2014 – Tower of US$70 Million Export, President of the Republic of Korea
- 2020 – Award of Development and Contribution, Seoul National University

== Selected articles ==
- Pahk, H.J.; Kim, Y.H.; Hong, Y.S.; Kim, S.G. (1993). "Development of Computer-Aided Inspection System with CMM for Integrated Mold Manufacturing". CIRP Annals - Manufacturing Technology. 42 (1): 557–560. doi:10.1016/S0007-8506(07)62508-6.
- Ahn, K.G.; Pahk, H.J.; Jung, M.Y.; Cho, D.W. (1996). "A Hybrid-Type Active Vibration Isolation System Using Neural Networks". Journal of Sound and Vibration. 192 (4): 793–805. doi:10.1006/jsvi.1996.0218.
- Pahk, Heui Jae; Kim, Young Sam; Moon, Joon Hee (1997). "A New Technique for Volumetric Error Assessment of CNC Machine Tools Incorporating Ball Bar Measurement and 3D Volumetric Error Model". International Journal of Machine Tools and Manufacture. 37 (11): 1583–1596. doi:10.1016/S0890-6955(97)00029-1.
- Pahk, Heui Jae; Lee, Dong Sung; Park, Jong Ho (2001). "Ultra Precision Positioning System for Servo Motor–Piezo Actuator Using the Dual Servo Loop and Digital Filter Implementation". International Journal of Machine Tools and Manufacture. 41 (1): 51–63. doi:10.1016/S0890-6955(00)00061-4.
- Pahk, H.; Lee, S.W. (2002). "Thermal Error Measurement and Real Time Compensation System for the CNC Machine Tools Incorporating the Spindle Thermal Error and the Feed Axis Thermal Error". The International Journal of Advanced Manufacturing Technology. 20 (7): 487–494. doi:10.1007/s001700200182.
