= Kang-Tae Kim =

South Korean mathematician (born 1957)

- 김강태
- Born: 1957 (age 68–69); Jeju Province, South Korea
- Education: Seoul National University (B.S., 1978); UCLA (Ph.D., 1988)
- Awards: Academic Award of Korea Mathematical Society
- Scientific career
- Fields: Mathematics
- Workplaces: Pohang University of Science and Technology
- Doctoral advisor: Robert E. Greene

Kang-Tae Kim (Korean: 김강태; born 1957) is a South Korean mathematician. He is a professor of mathematics at Pohang University of Science and Technology, and is the head of the Center for Geometric Research at the Center for Leading Research. He is one of executive editors of Complex Analysis and its Synergies, an international journal published by Springer-Verlag.

== Education ==
- 1978: B. Sc.; 1980 M. Sc. in Mathematics, Seoul National University, Seoul, South Korea
- 1980–83: Lieutenant Junior Grade, Republic of Korea Navy
- 1983–88: University of California, Los Angeles, United States
- 1988: Ph D. in Mathematics from UCLA (advisor: Robert E. Greene)

== Major academic positions ==
- 1988–1994: J.D. Tamarkin and regular assistant professor, Brown University, Rhode Island, United States
- 1994–1998: associate professor, POSTECH, South Korea
- 1999–present: professor of Mathematics, POSTECH, South Korea
- 1998–2000, 2004–2006: chairman, Mathematics Department of POSTECH (2 terms)
- 2011–present: director of the Center for Geometry and its Applications (SRC-GAIA)

== Service ==
- 2013–present: executive editor, Complex Analysis and its Synergies (Springer)
- 2001–2009: associate editor, Journal of Mathematical Analysis and Applications (Elsevier)
- 2007: chief editor of the Journal of the Korean Mathematical Society
- 2008–present: editor, Journal of Geometric Analysis (Springer)
- 1997–present: chair organizer of the KSCV Conference (10 times)
- 2001–2005: organized conference/school (two times) in Centre International de Rencontres Mathématiques, Luminy, France

== Books ==
- R. E. Greene, K.-T. Kim and S. G. Krantz: The Geometry of complex domains, Progress in Mathematics, Volume 291, Birkhauser-Verlag. 2011
- K.-T. Kim and Hanjin Lee: Schwarz's lemma from a differential geometric viewpoint, * Indian Institute of Science, Bangalore, India, published by the World Scientific, 2011.
- J.S. Bland, K.-T. Kim and S.G. Krantz, Eds. Complex and Riemannian geometry, Contemporary mathematics 322, American mathematical society, 2008.
- 김강태, 김성옥 (1999) 우리 아이들을 위한 미적분학 I, 교우사.
- K.-T. Kim and S.G. Krantz, Eds. Complex geometry in Pohang, Contemporary mathematics 222, American mathematical society, 1998.
- K.-T. Kim, Scaling methods in several complex variables, Lecture note series, Global Analysis Research Center, Seoul National University, 1990

== Articles ==
- Robert E. Greene, Kang-Tae Kim The Riemann mapping theorem from Riemann's viewpoint. Complex analysis and its synergies, 3:1, (2017). This is an Open-Access journal). The URL for the paper is .
- Joo, Jae-Cheon; Kim, Kang-Tae; Schmalz, Gerd On the generalization of Forelli's theorem. Math. Ann. 365 (2016), no. 3-4, 1187–1200.
- Kim, Kang-Tae; Zhang, Liyou On the uniform squeezing property of bounded convex domains in Cn . Pacific J. Math. 282 (2016), no. 2, 341–358.
- Ahn, Taeyong; Gaussier, Hervé; Kim, Kang-Tae Positivity and completeness of invariant metrics. J. Geom. Anal. 26 (2016), no. 2, 1173–1185.
- Fornaess, John-Erik; Kim, Kang-Tae Some problems. Complex analysis and geometry, 369–377, Springer Proc. Math. Stat., 144, Springer, Tokyo, 2015. 32-02
- Ahn, Taeyong; Gaussier, Hervé; Kim, Kang-Tae Unbounded pseudoconvex domains in Cn and their invariant metrics. Complex analysis and geometry, 49–55, Springer Proc. Math. Stat., 144, Springer, Tokyo, 2015.
- Kim, Kang-Tae; Ninh Van Thu On the tangential holomorphic vector fields vanishing at an infinite type point.Trans. Amer. Math. Soc. 367 (2015), no. 2, 867–885.
- Kim, Kang-Tae On the automorphism groups of complex domains. Geometry, number theory and representation theory, 65–78, KM Kyung Moon SA, Seoul, 2013.
- Greene, Robert E.; Kim, Kang-Tae; Krantz, Steven G.; Seo, Aeryeong Semicontinuity of automorphism groups of strongly pseudoconvex domains: the low differentiability case. Pacific J. Math. 262 (2013), no. 2, 365–395.
- Joo, Jae-Cheon; Kim, Kang-Tae; Schmalz, Gerd A generalization of Forelli's theorem. Math. Ann. 355 (2013), no. 3, 1171–1176.
- Kim, Kang-Tae Semi-continuity theorems for holomorphic automorphism groups. Proceedings of the 15th International Workshop on Differential Geometry and the 4th KNUGRG-OCAMI Differential Geometry Workshop [Volume 15], 99–102, Natl. Inst. Math. Sci. (NIMS), Taejŏn, 2011.
- Kim, Kang-Tae; Lee, Hanjin Schwarz's lemma from a differential geometric viewpoint. IISc Lecture Notes Series, 2. IISc Press, Bangalore; World Scientific Publishing Co. Pte. Ltd., Hackensack, NJ, 2011. xvi+82 pp. ISBN 978-981-4324-78-6; 981-4324-78-7
- Kim, Kang-Tae; Yoccoz, Jean-Christophe CR manifolds admitting a CR contraction. J. Geom. Anal. 21 (2011), no. 2, 476–493.
- Kim, Kang-Tae; Levenberg, Norman; Yamaguchi, Hiroshi Robin functions for complex manifolds and applications. Mem. Amer. Math. Soc. 209 (2011), no. 984, viii+111 pp. ISBN 978-0-8218-4965-1
- Kim, Kang-Tae; Levenberg, Norman; Yamaguchi, Hiroshi Robin functions for complex manifolds and applications. Complex analysis and digital geometry, 175–197, Acta Univ. Upsaliensis Skr. Uppsala Univ. C Organ. Hist., 86, Uppsala Universitet, Uppsala, 2009.
- Choi, Young-Jun; Khoi, Le Hai; Kim, Kang-Tae On an explicit construction of weakly sufficient sets for the function algebra A−∞(Ω) . Complex Var. Elliptic Equ. 54 (2009), no. 9, 879–897.
- Kim, Kang-Tae; Poletsky, Evgeny; Schmalz, Gerd Functions holomorphic along holomorphic vector fields. J. Geom. Anal. 19 (2009), no. 3, 655–666. 32A10 (35A20)
- Kim, Kang-Tae; Krantz, Steven G. Complex scaling and geometric analysis of several variables. Bull. Korean Math. Soc. 45 (2008), no. 3, 523–561.
- Kim, Kang-Tae; Kim, Sung-Yeon CR hypersurfaces with a contracting automorphism. J. Geom. Anal. 18 (2008), no. 3, 800–834.
- Kim, Kang-Tae; Levenberg, Norman; Yamaguchi, Hiroshi Robin functions for complex manifolds and applications. Complex analysis and its applications, 25–42, OCAMI Stud., 2, Osaka Munic. Univ. Press, Osaka,2007.
- Kim, Kang-Tae; Lee, Hanjin On the Omori-Yau almost maximum principle. J. Math. Anal. Appl. 335 (2007), no. 1, 332–340.
- Cima, Joseph A.; Graham, Ian; Kim, Kang Tae; Krantz, Steven G. The Carathéodory-Cartan-Kaup-Wu theorem on an infinite-dimensional Hilbert space. Nagoya Math. J. 185 (2007), 17–30.
- Fridman, B. L.; Kim, K.-T.; Krantz, S. G.; Ma, D. On determining sets for holomorphic automorphisms. Rocky Mountain J. Math. 36 (2006), no. 3, 947–955.
- Kim, Kang-Tae; Krantz, Steven G. The automorphism groups of domains. Amer. Math. Monthly 112 (2005), no. 7, 585–601.
- Kim, Kang-Tae; Ma, Daowei A note on: "Characterization of the Hilbert ball by its automorphisms'' [J. Korean Math. Soc. 40 (2003), no. 3, 503–516; MR1973915]. J. Math. Anal. Appl. 309 (2005), no. 2, 761–763.
- Kim, Kang-Tae; Krantz, Steven G.; Spiro, Andrea F. Analytic polyhedra in C2 with a non-compact automorphism group. J. Reine Angew. Math. 579 (2005), 1–12.
- Kim, Kang-Tae On the automorphism groups of convex domains in Cn . Adv. Geom. 4 (2004), no. 1, 33–40.
- Kim, Kan-Tè; Shmal′ts, G. Dynamics of local automorphisms of embedded CR-manifolds. (Russian); translated from Mat. Zametki 76 (2004), no. 477–480 Math. Notes 76 (2004), no. 3-4, 443–446
- Kim, Kang-Tae; Verdiani, Luigi Complex n -dimensional manifolds with a real n2 -dimensional automorphism group. J. Geom. Anal. 14 (2004), no. 4, 701–713.
- Kim, Kang-Tae Analytic polyhedra with non-compact automorphism group. Complex analysis in several variables—Memorial Conference of Kiyoshi Oka's Centennial Birthday, 135–140, Adv. Stud. Pure Math., 42, Math. Soc. Japan, Tokyo, 2004.
- Gaussier, Hervé; Kim, Kang-Tae Compactness of certain families of pseudo-holomorphic mappings into Cn .Internat. J. Math. 15 (2004), no. 1, 1–12. 32Q65
- Kim, Kang-Tae; Krantz, Steven G. The Bergman metric invariants and their boundary behavior. Explorations in complex and Riemannian geometry, 139–151, Contemp. Math., 332, Amer. Math. Soc., Providence, RI, 2003.
- Cheung, C. K.; Kim, Kang-Tae The constant curvature property of the Wu invariant metric. Pacific J. Math. 211 (2003), no. 1, 61–68.
- Kim, Kang-Tae; Krantz, Steven G. Normal families of holomorphic functions and mappings on a Banach space.Expo. Math. 21 (2003), no. 3, 193–218.
- Kim, Kang-Tae; Krantz, Steven G. Determining sets and fixed points for holomorphic endomorphisms. Function spaces (Edwardsville, IL, 2002), 239–246, Contemp. Math., 328, Amer. Math. Soc., Providence, RI, 2003.
- Kim, Kang-Tae; Krantz, Steven G. Some new results on domains in complex space with non-compact automorphism group. J. Math. Anal. Appl. 281 (2003), no. 2, 417–424.
- Fridman, B. L.; Kim, K. T.; Krantz, S. G.; Ma, D. On fixed points and determining sets for holomorphic automorphisms. Michigan Math. J. 50 (2002), no. 3, 507–515.
- Kim, Kang-Tae; Lee, Sunhong Asymptotic behavior of the Bergman kernel and associated invariants in certain infinite type pseudoconvex domains. Forum Math. 14 (2002), no. 5, 775–795.
- Byun, Jisoo; Gaussier, Hervé; Kim, Kang-Tae Weak-type normal families of holomorphic mappings in Banach spaces and characterization of the Hilbert ball by its automorphism group. J. Geom. Anal. 12 (2002), no. 4, 581–599.
- Kim, Kang-Tae; Krantz, Steven G. Characterization of the Hilbert ball by its automorphism group. Trans. Amer. Math. Soc. 354 (2002), no. 7, 2797–2818.
- Kim, Kang-Tae; Krantz, Steven G. Complex scaling and domains with non-compact automorphism group.Illinois J. Math. 45 (2001), no. 4, 1273–1299.
- Kim, Kang-Tae; Pagano, Andrea Normal analytic polyhedra in C2 with a noncompact automorphism group. J. Geom. Anal. 11 (2001), no. 2, 283–293.
