= Kyung-joon =

- Hangul: 경준
- RR: Gyeongjun
- MR: Kyŏngjun

Kyung-joon, also spelled Kyung-jun or Kyoung-jun, is a Korean given name.

- Jeon Kyung-jun (born 1973), South Korean football player
- Kim Kyung-Jun (born 1987), South Korean violinist
- Ko Kyung-joon (born 1987), South Korean football player
- Ou Kyoung-jun (born 1987), South Korean footballer
- Kim Kyung-joon (businessman), one of the principals in the 2007 BBK stock price manipulation incident tied to South Korean president Lee Myung-bak
- Lee Kyoung-jun, South Korean management professor

Fictional characters with this name include:

- Kang Kyung-joon, in 2012 South Korean television series Big

== See also ==
- List of Korean given names
