= Wan Kyun Chung =

Wan Kyun Chung from the Pohang University of Science and Technology, Pohang, Korea was named Fellow of the Institute of Electrical and Electronics Engineers (IEEE) in 2016 for developments in robust control theory for mechanical systems.
