= Hwayoung Shon =

South Korean gayageum player

Hwayoung Shon (Korean: 손화영) is a South Korean-born gayageum performer, composer, and educator based in the San Francisco Bay Area. Her work integrates Korean traditional music with contemporary composition and cross-cultural collaboration. She has performed as a soloist and collaborator with orchestras, chamber ensembles, and international artists, appearing at institutions including Stanford Live, Cantor Arts Center, Old First Concerts, and the Korean Cultural Center Washington, D.C. Her compositions have been presented through international sound art projects and contemporary music collaborations.

== Early life and education ==
Shon began studying piano at the age of three. At eight, she began studying the gayageum, a traditional Korean plucked string instrument, and later devoted herself to the instrument. She won first place at the National Korean Traditional Music Competition and made her broadcast debut on KBS's New Artist Music Concert in 1986. She later graduated from Seoul National University.

== Career ==
=== Performance and collaborations ===
Shon has performed internationally as a gayageum soloist and collaborative musician, working with symphony orchestras, chamber ensembles, jazz musicians, and world music artists. Her performances have been broadcast on KBS, MBC, EBS, SBS, BBC, RTVE, WGVU-FM, KAZU-FM, CKRL, Wave Farm, and Noise Radio.

In 2018, she performed Kim Juk-pa style gayageum sanjo at Herbst Theatre in San Francisco as part of the Korea Week national holiday concert organized by the Consulate General of the Republic of Korea in San Francisco.

During the COVID-19 period, Shon performed a piece by Jean Ahn for Marin Symphony's Valentine's Day showcase.

In 2021, Shon performed the complete Kim Juk-pa style gayageum sanjo at Old First Concerts in San Francisco. She also collaborated with international musicians, including Chinese erhu performer Guo Gan. That year, she also performed in Fusion Soul, a collaboration with jazz saxophonist Karlton Hester and the NMK Ensemble exploring the fusion of jazz and traditional Korean music.

That same year, she performed with the Wooden Fish Ensemble at Stanford University's Campbell Recital Hall, hosted by the Stanford Department of Music. The Stanford Daily described her as "a renowned gayageum performer" and noted that her performance created "complex and beautiful transient harmonies."

As a featured soloist with the Santa Cruz Symphony under Music Director Daniel Stewart during its 2023–24 season, Shon gave the US premiere of Jean Ahn's Jajang, Jajang for Gayageum and Orchestra. Lookout Santa Cruz described her as "a master of the instrument" whose work spans musical idioms including jazz and K-pop.

In May 2024, Shon was invited to perform at the Pacific Pythagorean Music Festival by the Del Sol Quartet.

She gave the world premiere of Night Owls, a work written for her by Laurie San Martin, a Barlow Endowment recipient, commissioned for Hwayoung Shon and Ensemble ARI, performed at Saint Mary's College in Moraga, California on October 27, 2024. The program also featured Jean Ahn's The Beatles on the Bridge, arranged for gayageum and piano quartet, and works by San Francisco composer Danny Clay arranged for gayageum and piano.

In 2024, she participated in the inaugural Forms & Frequencies music series at Stanford University's Cantor Arts Center, presented in conjunction with the exhibition Spirit House.

In January 2025, Shon appeared in Stanford Live's Harps of Asia, performed by Vân-Ánh Vanessa Võ and the Blood Moon Orchestra in the Studio at Bing Concert Hall.

She also participated in Unfolding Koreanness: Exploring Identity in the Age of Migration, an exhibition at the Korean Cultural Center Washington, D.C. in 2025. The exhibition presented a deconstructed gayageum installation and a continuous screening of her sanjo performance.

=== Education and outreach ===
Shon has given lectures and workshops at the University of California, Santa Cruz, the San Francisco Conservatory of Music, and California State University, Sacramento. In 2019, she gave an invited lecture and performance titled Gayageum: 1,500 Years of Resonance (가야금, 천오백년의 울림) at the Korean Martyrs Catholic Church in San Jose, California, organized by the church library. She has also written columns on Korean traditional music for The Korea Times and The Hyundai News US.

== Compositions ==
Shon's compositions span solo gayageum, vocal music, choral works, and cross-cultural ensemble formats. Her music explores connections between Korean traditional aesthetics, improvisation, contemporary composition, and sound art.

Her composition Ancient Traveler was selected for Polar Sounds, an international sound art project by Cities and Memory in collaboration with the Alfred Wegener Institute's Helmholtz Centre for Polar and Marine Research. The work reimagines field recordings from polar oceans through gayageum and Asian instruments. It was later featured in an interactive installation at Klimahaus Bremerhaven and presented through international broadcasts and media coverage, including RTVE and coverage by Mongabay.

Her composition Azul – Two Worlds was created for A Century of Sounds, a project by Cities and Memory in collaboration with the Pitt Rivers Museum at the University of Oxford. The work reinterprets archival Berber field recordings through gayageum performance and Asian instruments.

Ritual, a solo gayageum composition written in 2020 during the COVID-19 pandemic when live performance opportunities were limited, draws on traditional Korean rites (jerye) performed to overcome national hardship, blending the melodic character of the geomungo and the rhythms of percussion instruments on the gayageum's twelve strings.

In May 2024, Shon performed May You Find Rebirth in Paradise, a composition for gayageum, at the Pacific Pythagorean Music Festival, co-presented by sfSound and the Del Sol Quartet.

In June 2026, four of her original compositions received world premieres at Old First Concerts in San Francisco: Prologue, Mugunghwa: Red Light, Green Light, 도깨비불 (Will-o'-the-Wisp), and 구미호 (Gumiho). The Korea Times described her playing as going "beyond mere accompaniment," demonstrating "delicate technique and a gayageum sound that showcased the beauty of the instrument," with "a ripened mood that only the gayageum can convey."

== Discography ==
- Dialogue (2022) – improvisational duo album with pianist James Armstrong.
- Scattered Melodies (Live in San Francisco) (2023) – live recording of Kim Juk-pa style gayageum sanjo performed at Old First Concerts, San Francisco.
- Ancient Traveler (colliding icebergs) (2023) – a released track from Polar Sounds, an international sound art project by Cities and Memory in collaboration with the Alfred Wegener Institute's Helmholtz Centre for Polar and Marine Research.

== Awards ==
Shon has won numerous national and regional Korean traditional music competitions, including the Grand Prize at the Goryeong National Gayageum Competition in 1993, and the Grand Award in the Korean Traditional Music Division at the 8th Dalgubeol Arts Festival in 1989.
