= Won-Sik Yang =

South Korean orthodontist (born 1936)

- Born: April 18, 1936; Kaijō, Korea, Empire of Japan (now Kaesong, North Korea)
- Died: 2014
- Occupation: Orthodontist
- Known for: Foundation of the Korean Association of Orthodontists

Korean name
- Hangul: 양원식
- RR: Yang Wonsik
- MR: Yang Wŏnsik

Won-Sik Yang (Korean: 양원식; born April 18, 1936) was a South Korean orthodontist who is known for his contributions in establishing the Korean Association of Orthodontists (KAO). He served as the first editor-in-chief for the Korean Journal of Orthodontics (KJO) in 1970.

== Life ==
He was born in Kaesong in 1936. He attended Seoul National University for his college, dental and orthodontic education. He also received his Ph.D. from Seoul University. Yang played an important role in establishing the Korean Association of Orthodontists. He served as the President of KAO in 1980. Yang was also the first editor-in-chief for the KJO in 1970. During his tenure, the KJO was published twice a year. In 1995, he was elected to the board of trustees of KAO and served as the committee director of the Korean Board of Orthodontics. In 1996, 51 orthodontists were approved as board certified.

== Positions ==
- 1970 - Founding editor-in-chief of Korean Journal of Orthodontics
- 1980–1982 - Founding president, Korean Association of Orthodontists
- 1988–1990 - President, Korean Division, International Association of Dental Research
- 1986–1994 - Director, Department of orthodontics, Dental Hospital, Seoul National University
- 1995–1998 - Chairman of Council, Korean Association of Orthodontists

== Awards ==
- Grand Science Award, Korean Dental Association, 2000
- Jade Stripes Order of Service Merit, 2001
- Professor emeritus, Seoul National University, 2001
