= Jean Ahn =

South Korean composer (born 1976)

- 안진
- Born: 1976 (age 49–50); Seoul, South Korea
- Education: Seoul National University (BM, MM); University of California, Berkeley (PhD)
- Occupations: Composer, lecturer
- Employer(s): University of California, Berkeley
- Organizations: Ensemble ARI (Director), CHIM Studios (Music Director)
- Known for: Composition inspired by Korean and Asian traditional music
- Awards: Renée Fisher Competition (First Prize), Sejong Korean Music Competition (First Prize), De Lorenzo Prize in Music Composition, Isadora Duncan Award

Jean Ahn (Korean: 안진; born 1976) is a composer based in San Francisco, originally from Korea. Her music is inspired by Korean and Asian traditional music and instruments. She composes for a variety of different instruments and ensembles: orchestral works, choral works, solo works, duets, chamber music, and electronic music and computer music. Her accolades include First Prize at the Renée Fisher Competition and the Sejong Korean Music Competition, awards from the Korean National Music Composers Association, the De Lorenzo Prize in Music Composition, and the Isadora Duncan Award for her piece Saltdoll.

She was a finalist for the Toulmin Prize (League of Orchestra Commissioning Competition) in 2019 and 2020, and was a finalist for the 2020 American Prize.

== Early life and education ==
Ahn was born in 1976 in Seoul, South Korea. She began her musical studies at the age of four on piano with her mother. Ahn started composing music when she was five and loved to improvise. She then entered the Seoul Arts High School as a composition major.

Ahn went on to study composition at collegiate level at the Seoul National University (SNU), obtaining a Bachelor of Music in 1999 and a Master of Music in 2001. At SNU, she primarily was taught and focused on German serialism. While at SNU, she took interest in Korean music as well as learning gayageum.

Ahn moved to the United States in 2001 to continue her studies and earned her PhD in composition in 2008 at the University of California, Berkeley. She is currently the director of Ensemble ARI, and a lecturer at the University of California, Berkeley. She is also the Music director of CHIM Studios.

== Compositions ==
Ahn's works can be categorized in three groups:

1. Pieces using Korean folksong
2. Pieces only using Korean musical elements
3. Pieces written for Korean instruments, but playing non-Korean traditional styles/music

Ahn's Miracle for narrator, voice, and gayaguem was written for the Korean National Music Festival where she received a composers's award. It was her first try at using Korean musical elements. It was successful and was performed by the National Orchestra of Korea in 2000.

In 2001 Ahn won another award for Choral for gayageum quartet. While studying in California, she composed Pesante, a piece for chamber orchestra based on pentatonic scales and Korean rhythmic patterns.

Four years later Ahn submitted Nil-lili to the 2005 Sejong Composition Competition. Nil-lili is an arrangement of a Korean folksong for piano. With Nil-lili Ahn won first place in the 2005 Sejong Composition Competition. Nil-lili was also chosen to be a required piece for the 2018 piano competition of the New England Piano Teacher's Association.

After Nil-lili, Ahn ended up composing two more Korean folksong arrangements for piano: Mongeumpo and Ongheya. With Ongheya, Ahn won a Renée B. Fisher Competition Composer Award in 2008 as well as Ongheya being a required piece for the elementary/middle school division at the Fisher Piano Competition the same year.

Ahn combined Nil-lili, Mongeumpo and Ongheya in a collection titled Folksong Revisited for solo piano in 2008.

WIth Ahn's interest in Korean folksong, she composed another folksong series, Korean Art Song Revisited for voice and piano. The piece includes five folksongs arranged for voice and piano. In this piece, Ahn provided texts, translations, and International Phonetic Alphabetical pronunciation.

Recently Ahn's Blush for solo clarinet was named a required piece for the 2023 International Clarinet Association's Young Artist Competition.
