= Cho Byoung-se =

South Korean academic (born 1949)

Senior Secretary to the Prime Minister of South Korea

Chief of Protocol to the Prime Minister of South Korea

Personal details
- Born: March 20, 1949 (age 77) South Korea
- Education: Seoul National University, Hanyang University
- Occupation: Politician, professor

Cho Byoung-se (Korean: 조병세; born March 20, 1949) is a South Korean government official, economist and academic professor. He was a Senior Secretary to the Prime Minister of South Korea, a Chief of Protocol to the Prime Minister, Vice Minister, and Chair Director of a government owned corporation.

== Education ==
In February 1988 he graduated from Seoul National University, Korea with master's degree in Public Policy Making. In February 1994 he earned a PhD in Economics on Hanyang University.

== Academic career ==
- 1993–1994 Research Advisor, KAIST (Korea Advanced Institute of Science & Technology), Korea
- 1996–1997 Adjunct Professor, University of New South Wales (UNSW), Australia
- Mar. 2001–Present Professor, Hanyang University; Korea,
- Jan.2004 – Sep.2005 Professor, University of Pennsylvania, Taught "Korean Political Economy" and "North Korean Political Economy"
- Sep. 2007 – Jan. 2008, Professor, Tashkent State University of Oriental Studies; Uzbekistan
- Mar. 2011 – Jul. 2013 Exchange Professor, Chengchi University (NCCU); Taipei, Taiwan
- Oct. 2013 – until present Visiting Professor, Jagiellonian University, Kraków, Poland

== Books ==
- Understanding of Korean Politics, NCCU Textbook, 2012
- Understanding of Korean Economy, NCCU Textbook, 2012
- Song Taizu Zhao Guangyin (Korean), Taebong, 2011
- Hearing the Sound of Falling Rain over the Gourd Flower on the Fence, Maewon, 2010
- Those People Who Love Mountains (Korean), A Collection of Essays, Shinsin, 1999
- Korean Economy and Chinese Economy (Korean), Daewoong, 1994
- Youngdong, This Youngdong (Korean), Regional Research, Shinsin, 1990
- Footprints of Youngdong District (Korean), Regional Research, Shinsin, 1993
