= Choe Jong-gil =

South Korean academic (1931–1973)

- Hangul: 최종길
- Hanja: 崔鍾吉
- RR: Choe Jonggil
- MR: Ch'oe Chonggil

Choe Jong-gil (Korean: 최종길; April 28, 1931 – October 19, 1973), sometimes romanized as Tsche Chong-kil, was a professor at the Law College of Seoul National University.

He was born in Gongju on April 28, 1931.

He died on October 19, 1973 in Seoul. For years, the government denied any involvement in his death, but in 2002 the Presidential Truth Commission announced the results of its investigation: during interrogation by the KCIA he fell, or was thrown, from a seventh story window; he is also believed to have been tortured. In 2006 the government was ordered to pay 184 million won in damages; an intelligence agent who had accused him of spying for North Korea was ordered to pay an additional 20 million.

== See also ==
- History of South Korea
- Human rights in South Korea
