= Gwangju National University of Education =

University in Gwangju, South Korea

Coordinates: 35.165°N 126.9263°E

- Type: National
- Established: 1923 as Chonnam Public Teachers School. In 1993 became Gwangju National University of Education
- President: Dosung Choi
- Undergraduates: 1,500
- Postgraduates: 700
- Location: Gwangju, South Korea
- Website: eng.gnue.ac.kr

- Gwangju National University of Education
- Hangul: 광주교육대학교
- Hanja: 光州敎育大學校
- RR: Gwangju gyoyuk daehakgyo
- MR: Kwangju kyoyuk taehakkyo

Gwangju National University of Education (also Kwangju National University of Education; Korean: 광주교육대학교) is a national university located in Buk-gu, Gwangju, South Korea. It is one of ten national universities that are designed to raise high-quality elementary school teachers. Its origins lie in the Chonnam Public Teachers School founded in 1923. In 1961 this became the Gwangju Teachers College running a two-year teacher training programme. In 1993 it became the Gwangju National University of Education and runs four year teacher training programmes. Starting in 1996 it has also run a graduate school.

== International Relationships ==
In 1995, Gwangju National University Education establishes a sisterhood relationship with Naruto University of Education in Japan. The university expands the international relationships with University of Pittsburgh (1997. 5. 1), University of Illinois at Chicago (1998. 3. 23), and University of South Africa (1998. 7. 20).

== Notable people ==
- Namgi Park, former President of the institution 2008-2012

== See also ==
- List of national universities in South Korea
- List of universities and colleges in South Korea
- Education in Korea
