= Namgi Park =

Korean professor

Namgi Park (Korean: 박남기) is a Korean professor in Education and former president of Gwangju National University of Education, South Korea.

== Education ==
He obtained a bachelor's degree in Education and master's degree in Educational administration from Seoul National University in 1984 and 1986 respectively. He proceeded to the University of Pittsburgh where he received a Doctorate degree (Ph.D.) in International and Developmental Education, in April 1993.

== Career ==
He began his career in Gwangju National University of Education. (Note: Gwangju National University of Education is a nationally accredited university according to the Korean Council for University Education (Korean Council for University Education: Accredited Institutions (listed under Kwangju)) (Accessed May 2015)) He was appointed President of the institution in October 2008 and served in that capacity for four years until 2012. He serves as professor of GNUE, president of the Korean Institute for Educational Policy of KFTA(Korea Federation of Teacher Association), president of Classroom Management Research Institute, President of Samsung Hope Network Gwangju. Prior to his appointment as president of Gwuangju National University of education, he served as Vice President of the World Council for Comparative Education Societies, a position he held between July 1998 to July 2001.

== Selected publications ==
- Weidman, John, and Park, Namgi (Eds.). (2000). Korean higher education: Tradition and adaptation. New York: Falmer Press.
- Mauch, James and Namgi Park. (2003.05). Guide to the successful thesis and dissertation : A handbook for students and faculty (5th ed.). New York : M. Dekker.
- Park, Namgi (2010). The art of best teaching. Seoul: Sang-gakNamu.
- Park, Namgi, Park, Jumsook, &Mun, Jihyun. (2008). Teachers’ life in school. Seoul: Woori.
- Park, Namgi, & Kim, Gunyoung. (2007). Classroom management with Parents. Daegu: Taeilsa.
