= Nishikatsura =

Nishikatsura 西桂町
- Town
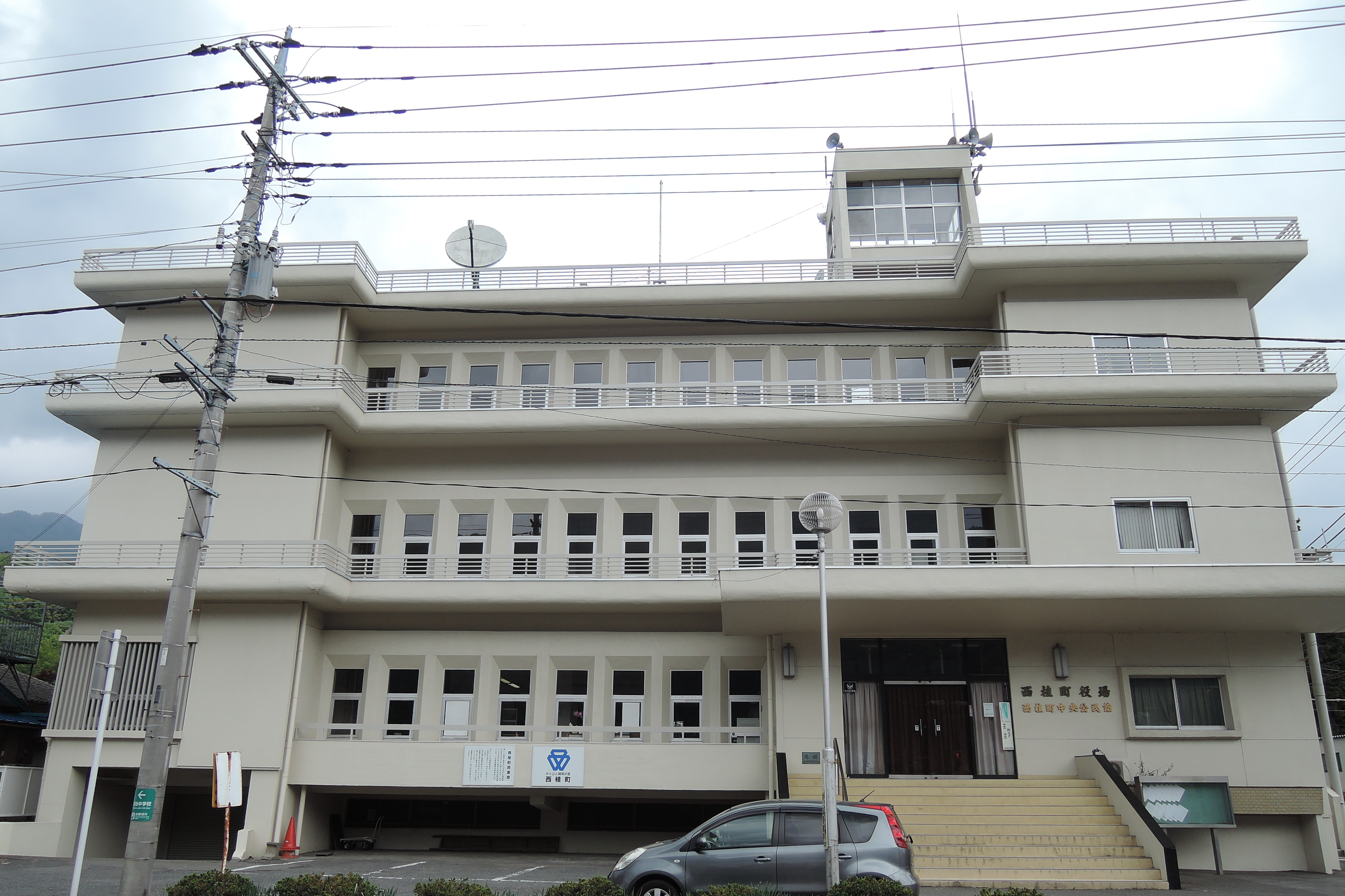
- Nishikatsura town hall

- Flag Emblem

- Location of Nishikatsura in Yamanashi Prefecture

- Coordinates: 35°31′26.8″N 138°50′48.7″E
- Country: Japan
- Region: Chūbu; Tōkai
- Prefecture: Yamanashi
- District: Minamitsuru

Area
  - Total: 15.22 km^{2} (5.88 sq mi)

Population (April 1, 2019)
  - Total: 4,298
  - Density: 282.4/km^{2} (731.4/sq mi)
- Time zone: UTC+9 (Japan Standard Time)
- Symbols
  - Tree: Red pine
  - Flower: Narcissus
  - Bird: Japanese tit
- Phone number: 0555-85-2311
- Address: 1501 Onuma Nishikatsura-chō Minimitsuru-gun, Yamanashi-ken 403-0022
- Website: Official website

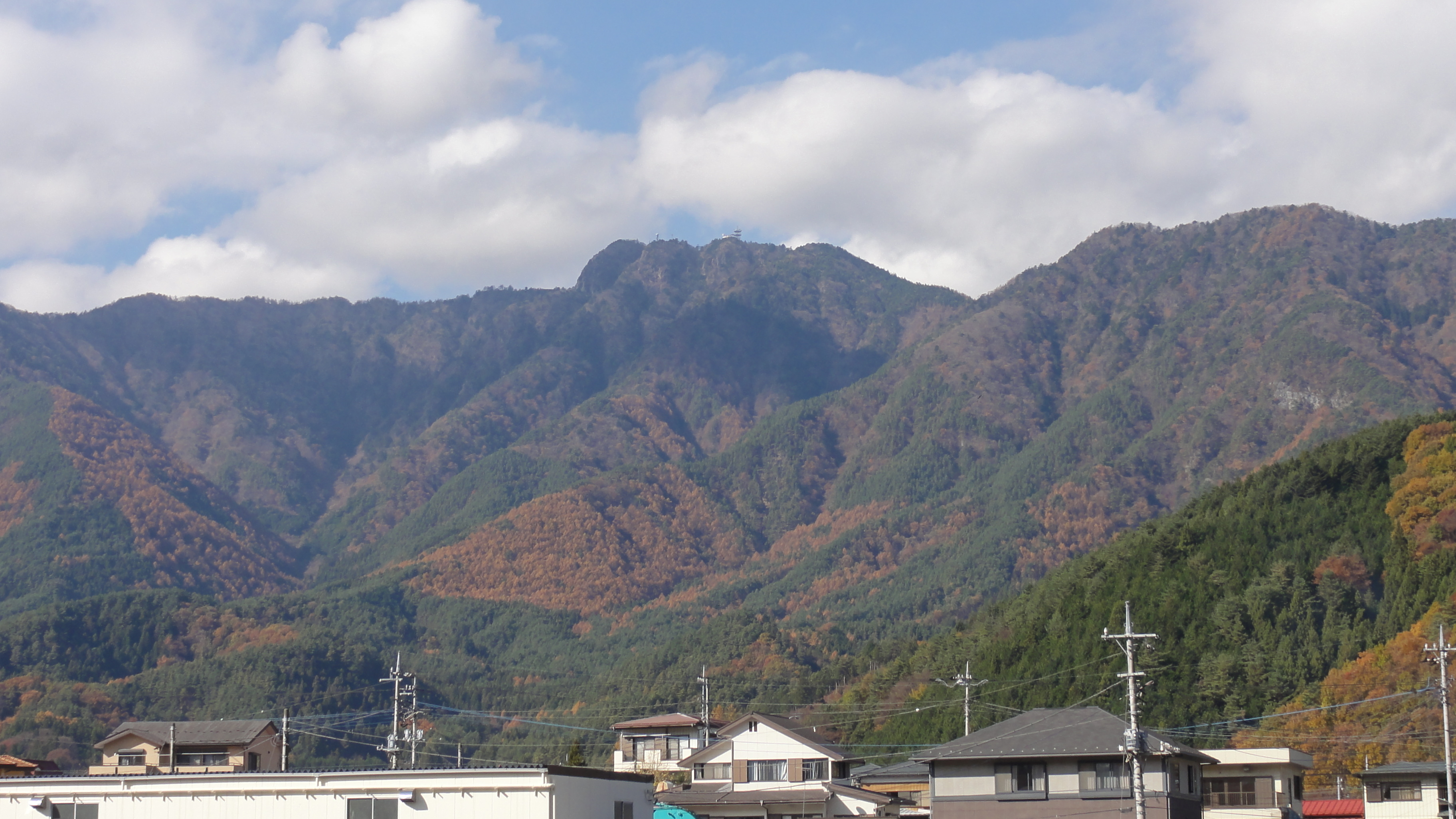
Mount Mitsutoge Station

Nishikatsura (西桂町, Nishikatsura-chō) is a town located in Yamanashi Prefecture, Japan. As of 1 June 2019, the town had an estimated population of 4,298 in 1552 households, and a population density of 280 persons per km^{2}. The total area of the town is 15.22 square kilometres (5.88 sq mi).

== Geography ==
Nishikatsura is situated in the Katsura River valley in southern Yamanashi Prefecture, near the northern foot of Mount Fuji, and is the departure point for climbs of Mount Mitsutoge, which affords unhindered views of Mount Fuji. The area is also famous for its pure, clean water.

=== Neighboring municipalities ===
- Yamanashi Prefecture
  - Fujikawaguchiko
  - Fujiyoshida
  - Tsuru

=== Climate ===
The town has a climate characterized by characterized by hot and humid summers, and relatively mild winters (Köppen climate classification Cfa). The average annual temperature in Nishikatsura is 10.4 °C. The average annual rainfall is 1641 mm with September as the wettest month.

== History ==
The area around modern Nishikatsura has been settled since prehistoric times, and developed from the Sengoku period, as a hamlet on the pilgrimage route to Mount Fuji. During the Edo period, all of Kai Province was tenryō territory under direct control of the Tokugawa shogunate. Per the early Meiji period establishment of the modern municipalities on July 1, 1889, the village of Katsura was created within Minamitsuru District, Yamanashi Prefecture. It was renamed Nishikatsura on June 3, 1893, after expansion through annexation of portions of neighboring villages, and was raised to town status on September 15, 1952.

== Demographics ==
Per Japanese census data, the population of Nishikatsura peaked around the year 2000 and has declined since.

Historical population
Year	Pop.	±%
1960	3,867	—
1970	3,829	−1.0%
1980	4,002	+4.5%
1990	4,409	+10.2%
2000	4,910	+11.4%
2010	4,541	−7.5%
2020	4,041	−11.0%

== Economy ==
Nishikatsura is home to numerous small textile plants, which manufacture neckties and umbrellas.

== Education ==
Nishikatsura has one public elementary school and one public middle school operated by the town government. The town does not have a high school.

== Transportation ==
=== Railway ===
- Fujikyuko Line
  - Mitsutōge

=== Highway ===
- National Route 139

== Sister cities ==
- Lingchuan County, Guangxi, China

== Notable people from Nishikatsura ==
- Yangji Lee, writer
