= Lee Yangji =

Japanese-Korean novelist (1955–1992)

- Born: 이양지; March 15, 1955; Nishikatsura, Yamanashi, Japan
- Died: May 22, 1992 (aged 37)
- Occupations: Writer, novelist

- Lee Yangji
- Hangul: 이양지
- Hanja: 李良枝
- RR: I Yangji
- MR: I Yangji
- Also referred to in Japanese as: イ・ヤンジ (I Yanji)

Yangji Lee (March 15, 1955 – May 22, 1992) was a Japanese-Korean novelist. She won the Akutagawa Prize for her work Yuhi, becoming the second Zainichi Korean to win the prize.

== Biography ==
Lee was born in Nishikatsura, Yamanashi, Japan. She was a second generation Japanese-Korean. When she was in grade school, her parents acquired Japanese citizenship and her nationality became Japanese at that time. Upon naturalization, she adopted the name Tanaka Yoshie (田中 淑枝). (Note: Yoshie is the Japanized pronunciation of 良枝, the kanji spelling of 양지.)

In 1982, while studying at Seoul National University, Lee published her work Nabi Taryong in the literary magazine Gunzou and her career as a writer began. In 1988, her work Yuhi won the 100th Akutagawa Prize, making her the second Zainichi Korean to receive the prize (the first being Lee Hoesung). While writing the novel Ishi no Koe, she contracted acute myocarditis and soon died.

== Bibliography ==
- Grieving Butterflies, 1982 (jap. ナビ・タリョン)
- Woman Diver, 1983 (jap. かずきめ)
- The Other Side of a Shadow Picture, 1985 (jap. 影絵の向こう)
- The Auburn Afternoon, 1985 (jap. 鳶色の午後)
- Time Ticking, 1985 (jap. 刻)
- Yuhi (jap. 由熙, ユヒ, kor. 유희)
- The Voice of Stones, 1992 (jap. 石の声)
- The Collection of Lee Yangji, 1993 (jap. 李良枝全集)
