= Lee Kyoung-jun =

South Korean management academic

- Education: KAIST (1995); Seoul National University (2003)
- Occupation: Professor of management
- Employer: Kyung Hee University

Korean name
- Hangul: 이경전
- RR: I Gyeongjeon
- MR: I Kyŏngjŏn

Lee Kyoung-jun is a South Korean management professor. He is a professor of the School of Management at Kyung Hee University. He was a visiting professor at UC Berkeley from February to August 2010 and a visiting professor at the Massachusetts Institute of Technology, from September 2009 to January 2010.

== Education ==
Lee received B.S. (1990), M.S. (1992), and Ph.D. (1995) in Management Science from KAIST. In addition, he also has a master's degree (2001) in Public Administration of Seoul National University, and finished the Ph.D. course (2003) from the same institution.

== Professional career ==
He worked as a visiting scientist in the Robotics Institute of Carnegie Mellon University, Pittsburgh, United States from 1996 to 1997. He was an assistant professor of School of Business in Korea University from 1999 to 2001. From 2001 to 2003, he joined the Graduate School of Public Administration, Seoul National University as a visiting assistant professor.

== Books ==
Co-authored by Kyoung Jun Lee, in Korean:

- Lee et al., We are going to Microsociety, Woongjin Wings, 2008.
- Cho, W., Lee, K., Lee, H., Kwon, O., Kim, K., and Lee, E., Ubiquitous Paradigm and u-Society, Jinhan M&B, 2006.
- Lee, J. K., Lee, K. J., and Kim, W. J. (eds.), Principles of Electronic Commerce Pubyoung Publishing, 2nd ed, 1999 and 4th ed., 2006.
- Suh, Y., Park, J., Kim, J., Lee, K. & Kim, K., Management Information Systems, Hankyung Publishing, 2004.
- Lee, K., e-Business Dictionary, MOCIE/KIEC, 2004.
- Lee, J. K. and Lee, K. J. (eds.), Electronic Commerce and Channel Revolution, Pubyoung Publishing, 2000.
- Lee, K. J., Infomediation and Electronic Commerce (Korean Translation of Net Worth authored by Hagel III and Singer), 2000.
- Cho, N. and Lee, K. J., Korean Translation of Internet Business Models and Strategies by Afuah & Tucci, 2001.
