= Kim Yong-jun (art critic) =

South Korean art critic (1904–1967)

Kim Yong-jun (Korean: 김용준; Hanja: 金瑢俊, 3 February 1904 - 3 November 1967), pen name Geunwon (근원; 近園), was a Korean artist, art critic, and art historian. He is known for writing Geunwon supil (근원수필; 近園隨筆; 1948) and Joseon misul daeyo (조선미술대요; 朝鮮美術大要; 1949) and providing theoretical frameworks to modern Korean art and art history.

== Early life and education ==
Kim Yong-jun was born in Daegu, Korea, in 1904. He attended Jungang High School (중앙고등보통학교; 中央高等普通學校; Jungang Godeung Botong Hakgyo) in Seoul. During this time, he entered and won a prize at the Government-General-hosted Joseon Arts Exhibition in 1924 with an oil painting entitled Dongsipjagak (동십자각), which led to the beginning of his career as an oil painter and artist.

He studied Western art in Tokyo Fine Arts School in Japan from 1926 to 1931 and practiced oil painting as well as beginning to work as an art critic. He studied with fellow Korean artists such as Gil Jin-seop (길진섭; 吉鎭燮, 1907–1975) and O Ji-ho (오지호; 吳之湖, 1906–1982) who were also students at a private painting studio that Kim Yong-jun attended in Seoul. The studio was established in 1923 by Yi Jong-u (이종우; 李鍾禹, 1899–1979), who studied in Tokyo Fine Arts School and later became the first Korean artist who studied Western art in Paris from 1925 to 1928.

== Career as artist and critic ==
Throughout the 1930s, Kim Yong-jun took part in several group exhibitions and established artist groups. In April 1930, he participated in Dongmijeon (동미전; 東美展), a group exhibition by Dongmihoe (Korean: 동미회; Hanja: 東美會), an association consisting of Korean alumni of Tokyo Fine Arts School. The exhibition aimed to study all aspects of modern art in order to return to the finding or reinventing of Korean art.

In December 1930, he established Baekman Western Painting Association (백만양화회; 白蠻洋畵會; Baekman Yanghwahoe) in Tokyo with Gil Jin-seop, Gu Bon-ung (구본웅; 具本雄, 1906–1952), Yi Ma-dong (이마동; 李馬銅, 1906–1980), and Kim Eung-jin (김응진; 金應璡, 1907–1977), and also established Mokilhoe (목일회; 牧日會) in 1934 and attempted to fuse Western modernism with Korean painting traditions to create a localised and 'truly Korean' style of oil painting.

After returning from Japan, Kim Yong-jun refused to submit works to the annual Joseon Arts Exhibition that was hosted by the Japanese Government-General. Instead, he entered in the Exhibition of the Society of Painters and Calligraphers (서화협회전; 書畵協會展; Seohwa Hyeophoejeon, 1921–1936), the annual exhibition hosted by Seohwa Hyeophoe (Society of Painters and Calligraphers).

Kim Yong-jun also frequently wrote editorials and essays for magazines and newspapers, such as Donga ilbo. His writings expressed his support for Korean nationalism and opposition to contemporary proletarian arts movements from the late 1920s. This was in contrast to some of his earlier support for the proletarian arts. Kim Yong-jun believed in the need for revolutionary art and artistic expression that went beyond conventional bourgeoisie academism but argued that art should not be considered to be tools to achieving revolution and pressed for the retention of art for art's sake.

His career-long investigation into the exploration of modern Korean (Joseon) art was also in line with such retention of 'art for art's sake' as he refrained from using his material for the realization of nationalist political agendas. In formulating modern Korean art, Kim Yong-jun argued that distinctly Korean art should be sought after and addressed the idea of the so-called 'local colour' (향토색; 鄕土色; Hyangtosaek), that became dominant in defining what was seen to be the essence or trait of Joseon painting styles under Japanese colonial rule, particularly through the influence of the Joseon Arts Exhibition. Though Kim Yong-jun pointed out the fallacies of local colour in its lack of in-depth exploration of Korean aesthetics or spirit and used abstract alternative expressions such as 'refined' (고담한 맛) or 'graceful' (한아한 맛), he stopped short at providing concrete conceptualizations of the essence of Korean art and artistic style.

By the end of the 1930s, Kim Yong-jun painted illustrations and cover designs with ink rather than the mixture of Western and traditional painting he used in the early 1930s. He did this in arts and culture magazines, Munjang (문장; 文章), and contributed essays on paintings, literature, and their connections, as well as his views on traditional painting. This marked the beginnings of his major research on Korean art history.

== Career after liberation ==
After liberation in 1945, Kim Yong-jun was appointed commissioner for Eastern Painting in the Headquarters for Construction of Korean Art (조선미술건설본부; 朝鮮美術建設本部; Joseon Misul Geonseol Bonbu), an artists association led by Go Hui-dong that attempted to reconstruct the Korean art field after liberation. After the disbandment of the association in 1945, he joined Korean Artists Association (조선미술가협회; 朝鮮美術家協會; Joseon Misulga Hyeopoe).

Kim Yong-jun also began teaching Eastern Painting at Seoul National University in 1946 as it became Korea's first national university with an arts school. Here he focused on teaching theory and art history and contributed to the institutionalization of art education until he left the university in 1948.

During the Korean War and North Korea's occupation of Seoul, Kim Yong-jun and his family decided to defect to North Korea. He played an influential role as a North Korean artist in developing Joseonhwa (조선화; 朝鮮畫).

== Notable works of art history ==
In 1948, Kim published Geunwon supil (근원수필; 近園隨筆), a collection of his short essays, and in 1949, Joseon misul daeyo (조선미술대요; 朝鮮美術大要), an encyclopedic take on Joseon art history. Joseon misul daeyo covered Korean art history from before the Three Kingdoms period to the colonial period, and included various photographs. The volume is considered as the first comprehensive, academically credible, analysis of Korean art history written by a Korean author.
