= Journal of Mathematical Analysis and Applications =

- Discipline: Mathematics
- Language: English
- Edited by: Goong Chen, Helene Frankowska, Steven G. Krantz

Publication details
- History: 1960–present
- Publisher: Elsevier
- Impact factor: 1.3 (2022)

Standard abbreviations
- ISO 4: J. Math. Anal. Appl.

Indexing
- CODEN: JMANAK
- ISSN: 0022-247X (print); 1096-0813 (web)

The Journal of Mathematical Analysis and Applications is an academic journal in mathematics, specializing in mathematical analysis and related topics in applied mathematics. It was founded in 1960 by Richard Bellman, as part of a series of new journals on areas of mathematics published by Academic Press, and is now published by Elsevier. For most years since 2003 it has been ranked by SCImago Journal Rank as among the top 25% of journals in its topic areas.
