= Pohang University of Science and Technology =

South Korean university

Coordinates: 36°00′39.18″N 129°19′21.61″E

- 포항공과대학교
- Motto: 성실, 창의, 진취
- Motto in English: Integrity, Creativity, and Aspiration
- Type: Private research university
- Established: December 3, 1986; 39 years ago
- President: Seong Keun Kim (ko)
- Faculty: 283 (2018)
- Students: 3,581 (2018)
- Undergraduates: 1,422 (2018)
- Postgraduates: 2,159 (2018)
- Location: Pohang, Gyeongbuk Province, South Korea
- Campus: Urban
- Colors: Red, orange, and grey
- Mascot: Postech Ponix (Phoenix)
- Website: postech.ac.kr

Korean name
- Hangul: 포항공과대학교
- Hanja: 浦項工科大學校
- RR: Pohang gonggwa daehakgyo
- MR: P'ohang kongkwa taehakkyo

POSTECH
- Hangul: 포스텍
- RR: Poseutek
- MR: P'osŭt'ek

Pohang University of Science and Technology (POSTECH, Korean: 포항공과대학교) is a private research university in Pohang, South Korea.

== History ==
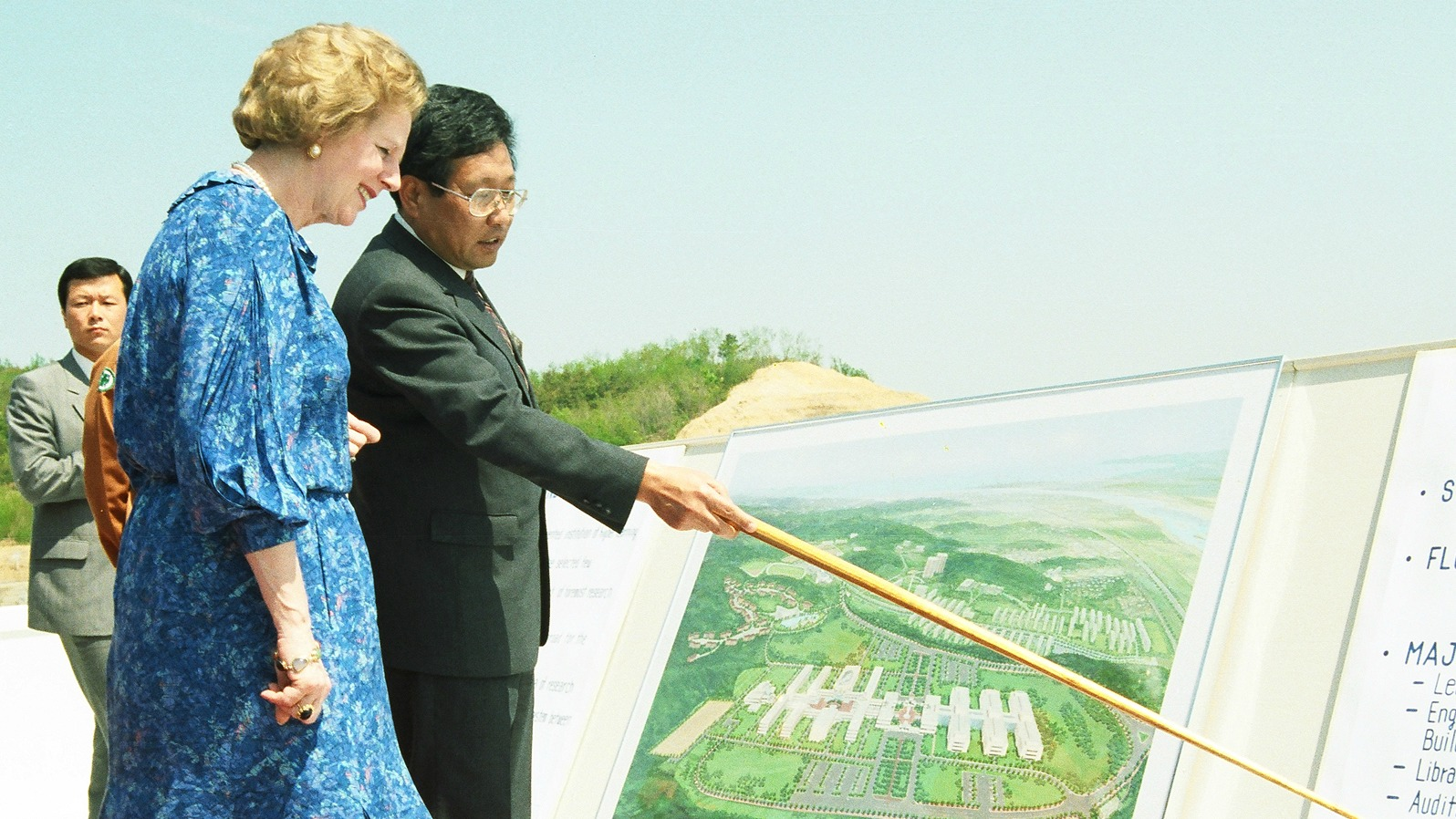
Margaret Thatcher with POSTECH president Hogil Kim in May 1986

Pohang University of Science and Technology was established on December 3, 1986, by POSCO, a South Korean steel company, with Founding Chairman Tae-joon Park and the university's first president, Hogil Kim. The university was founded as a research-focused institution and also hosted POSCO's Research Institute of Science and Technology (RIST) on campus. In 1994, POSTECH established the Pohang Accelerator Laboratory (PAL), a third-generation synchrotron light source, which later became a national research facility. In 2016, the university completed construction of the PAL-XFEL (X-ray Free Electron Laser), a fourth-generation light source, at a cost of approximately US$390 million. PAL-XFEL was the third facility of its kind in the world at the time of completion, intended to support research in various fields including life sciences, materials science, chemistry, and physics.

The university held its first matriculation ceremony on March 5, 1987. The Department of Life Sciences was founded on March 1, 1989. The first master's degrees were conferred on February 7, 1990, and the first bachelor's degrees on February 20, 1991. The Pohang Light Source was completed on December 7, 1994. In 1998, Asiaweek Magazine ranked POSTECH first among science and technology universities in Asia. On February 28, 2000, the university, in collaboration with the City of Pohang and POSCO, established the Pohang Techno Park. The Asia Pacific Center for Theoretical Physics relocated to POSTECH on August 23, 2001. The university was recognized by the Ministry of Education and Human Resources Development as an “Excellent University for Educational Reform” for seven consecutive years starting in the late 1990s. The Tae-joon Park Digital Library opened on April 25, 2003. The Graduate Institute of Ferrous Technology (GIFT) was established on September 9, 2005, followed by the National Institute for Nanomaterials Technology on May 30, 2007.

On March 2, 2010, POSTECH announced its bilingual campus initiative. An agreement with the Max Planck Society was signed on June 14, 2010, to establish the Max Planck POSTECH/Korea Research Initiative. On September 16 of the same year, Times Higher Education ranked POSTECH 28th in its World University Rankings. The Department of Creative IT Engineering was created on July 6, 2011, and the Graduate School of Engineering Mastership was established on August 20, 2012. In December 2012, POSTECH was included in Thomson Reuters’ list of the Top 100 Global Innovators. The Tae-joon Park Institute opened on February 15, 2013, and the groundbreaking ceremony for PAL-XFEL took place on May 9, 2013. On June 13, four research centers under the Institute for Basic Science (IBS) were established at the university.

POSTECH was ranked first among the top 100 universities under 50 years old by Times Higher Education in 2012, 2013, and 2014. It was also ranked first in the JoongAng Ilbo Korean University Rankings in both 2013 and 2014. The POSTECH Entrepreneurship Center, supported by the Small & Medium Business Administration, opened on September 15, 2014. The APGC-Lab and a startup company, exBrain, were launched on September 19. On December 17, 2014, the Pohang Center for Creative Economy & Innovation opened. On June 4, 2016, PAL-XFEL achieved first light, marking the start of its operational phase.

== Campus ==
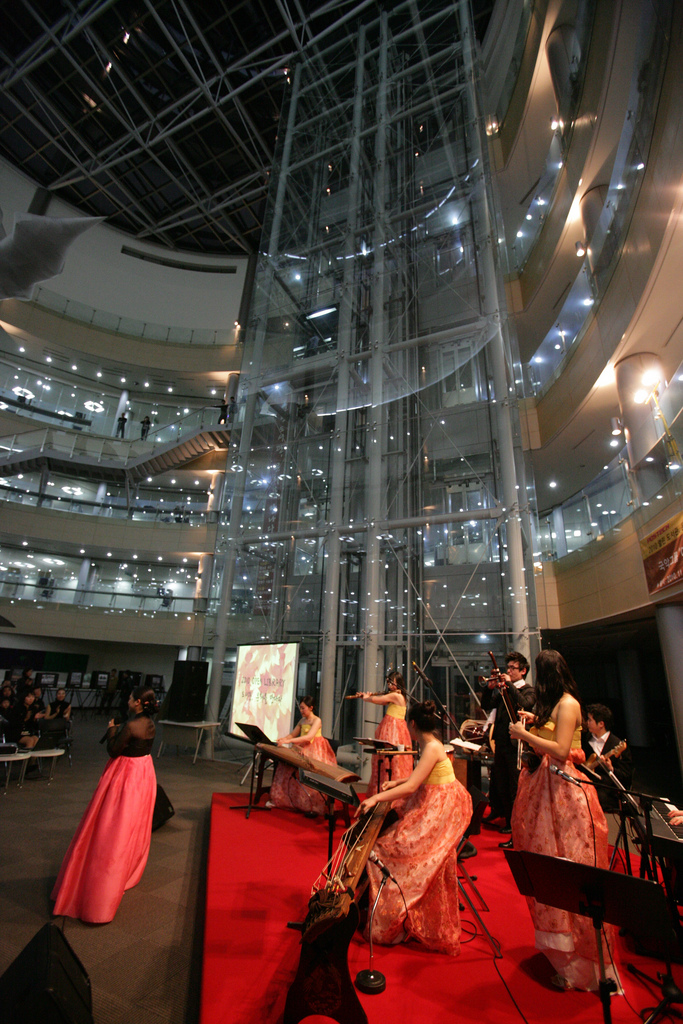
Traditional Korean performance at Tae-Joon Park Library

POSTECH is a 400-acre campus located twenty minutes by car from downtown Pohang, an hour by bus from Busan, and approximately two and half hours by train (KTX) from Seoul.

=== Tae-Joon Park Digital Library ===
Completed in 2003, the Tae-Joon Park Library is 24,420 square meters with 352,977 volumes and 8,324 digital and paper journals. As of 2005, the library collection consists of approximately 320,000 books, 3,500 journals, 7,000 e-journals 25 databases, and 4,400 multimedia materials. The Library shares materials with industrial-educational-research cooperation and is part of an intercollegiate data exchange program with approximately 150 other research and educational institutions throughout the nation.

=== Smart campus ===
In 2010, for the first time among Korean universities, POSTECH implemented a Desktop Cloud Service. However, many of the previously implemented technological services (e.g. campus smartphone applications, university website, university online portal, etc.) are defective as they have not been since updated.

== Presidents ==
Number	Name	Years in office
1	Hogil Kim (ko)	1985–1994
2	Sooyoung Chang	1994–1998
3	Sungkee Chang	1998–2002
4	Chanmo Park (ko)	2003–2007
5	Sunggi Baik (ko)	2007–2011
6	Yongmin Kim (ko)	2011–2015
7	Doh-Yeon Kim (ko)	2015–2019
8	Moo Hwan Kim (ko)	2019–2023
9	Seong Keun Kim (ko)	2023–Present

== University rankings ==
University rankings
QS National	General	5
THE National	General	5
ARWU National	Research	7–9
QS Asia (Asia version)	General	22
THE Asia (Asia version)	General	24
USNWR Asia	General	92
ARWU World	Research	301–400
QS World	General	102
THE World	General	=141
USNWR World	General	=380

In 1998, POSTECH was ranked by Asiaweek as the best science and technology university in Asia. From 2002 to 2006 JoongAng Ilbo ranked POSTECH as the leading university in Korea. In 2010, the Times Higher Education ranked POSTECH 28th in the world. In 2011, the Times Higher Education ranked the university as the 53rd best university in the world, the 6th best in Asia, and the best in South Korea. In 2017–2018, QS World University Rankings ranked POSTECH 71st overall in the world. It remains third best ranked in Korea, after Seoul National University and KAIST, in the QS Asian University Rankings. However, in the Times Higher Education rankings, it scored highly after compilers placed less emphasis on "reputation and heritage" and gave more weight to objective measures including the influence of universities' research, placing 53rd. In 2012 and 2013, the Times Higher Education ranked POSTECH 1st in its "100 Under 50 Young Universities" rankings. The New York Times and the International Herald Tribune cited POSTECH's rapid ascent as a young university to top the world rankings in less than 50 years.

== Academics ==
=== Admissions ===
POSTECH admits approximately 300 undergraduate students each year. POSTECH received 1,987 applicants for freshman admission and admitted 323 for the 2014 school year. POSTECH provides the highest educational investment and the most per-student scholarship support in Korea, allowing students from all economic backgrounds the opportunity to obtain a POSTECH education.

== Research ==
The 4th generation light source (PAL-XFEL), which has been operational since 2015, is 10 billion times brighter than the 3rd generation light source.
