= Seoul National University =

Public university in South Korea

- Motto: Veritas Lux Mea (Latin)
- Motto in English: The Truth is My Light
- Type: National
- Established: August 22, 1946; 80 years ago
- Affiliations: AALAU, AEARU, APRU, AUA
- President: Ryu Hong-lim (유홍림)
- Faculty: 2,278 (2022)
- Students: 28,264 (2022)
- Undergraduates: 15,870
- Postgraduates: 12,394
- Doctoral students: 4,019
- Location: Gwanak-gu, Seoul (Gwanak Campus), Jongno-gu, Seoul (Yeongeon Campus), Pyeongchang-gun, Gangwon-do (Pyeongchang Campus), Siheung-si, Gyeonggi-do (Siheung Campus), South Korea; 37°27′36″N 126°57′09″E
- Campus: Urban, 4.2 km^{2} (1037 acres) 7.0 km^{2} (1,729 acres), including the arboreta and other campuses.
- Colors: SNU Blue
- Mascots: Crane, Zelkova Tree
- Website: snu.ac.kr en.snu.ac.kr

Korean name
- Hangul: 서울대학교
- Hanja: 서울大學校
- Lit.: Seoul University
- RR: Seoul daehakgyo
- MR: Sŏul taehakkyo

Main campus in Gwanak District, Seoul.

Seoul National University (SNU; Korean: 서울대학교) is a public research university in Seoul, South Korea. Founded in 1946 by the merger of ten institutions in the Seoul area, it is one of the SKY universities and a part of the Flagship Korean National Universities.

The university's main campus is located in Gwanak, and two additional campuses are located in Daehangno and Pyeongchang. The university comprises sixteen colleges, one graduate school and nine professional schools. The student body consists of nearly 16,000 undergraduate and 16,000 graduate students.

== History ==
=== Pre-establishment ===
Seoul National University (SNU) originates from various educational institutions established by King Gojong of the Joseon dynasty. Several of them were integrated into various colleges when SNU was founded later.

To modernize the country, Gojong initiated the establishment of modern higher education institutions. By means of the issue of a royal order, the law academy Beopkwan Yangseongso has been founded on March 25, 1895. It produced 209 graduates including the later envoy Yi Tjoune. Hanseong Sabeomhakgyo (established in 1895), a training school for teachers and Euihakkyo (1899), a medical school, are also considered the origins of respective colleges.

After the proclamation of the Korean Empire in 1897, Gojong, the then emperor, was motivated to create more modern education institutions. In 1899, a medical school was established. This school changed its name several times to Daehan Euiwon Gyoyukbu and Gyeongseong Euihak Jeonmunhakgyo (Gyeongseong Medical College) and finally became College of Medicine of SNU. In 1901, a department for nursing was established, which was the forerunner of the later College of Nursing.

During the Japanese rule, Keijō Imperial University was established as one of Japan's nine imperial universities. After World War II and the independence of Korea, the name of the university was changed from Keijō Teikoku Daigaku (京城帝国大学) to Gyeongseong Daehak (경성대학, 京城大學, Gyeongseong University). The Hanja that were used in the name were pronounced in the Korean reading and the attribute "Imperial" was removed and changed to "National".

=== Establishment ===
SNU was founded on August 27, 1946, by merging ten institutions of higher education around the Seoul area. The schools which have been merged were:

- Gyeongseong (Seoul) University (Gyeongseong (Seoul) Daehak, 경성(서울)대학)
- Gyeongseong College of Education (Gyeongseong Sabeomhakgyo, 경성사범학교)
- Gyeongseong Women's College of Education (Gyeongseong Yeoja Sabeomhakgyo, 경성여자사범학교)
- Gyeongseong Law College (Gyeongseong Beophak Jeonmunhakgyo, 경성법학전문학교)
- Gyeongseong Industrial College (Gyeongseong Gongeop Jeonmunhakgyo, 경성공업전문학교)
- Gyeongseong Mining College (Gyeongseong Gwangsan Jeonmunhakgyo, 경성광산전문학교)
- Gyeongseong Medical College (Gyeongseong Euihak Jeonmunhakgyo, 경성의학전문학교)
- Suwon Agriculture College (Suwon Nongnim Jeonmunhakgyo, 수원농림전문학교)
- Gyeongseong College of Economics (Gyeongseong Gyeongje Jeonmunhakgyo, 경성경제전문학교)
- Gyeongseong Dentistry College (Gyeongseong Chigwa Euihak Jeonmunhakgyo, 경성치과의학전문학교)

The first president was Harry Bidwell Ansted. For over a year and a half, there was a protest movement by students and professors against the law of the U.S. military government in Korea merging colleges. Finally, 320 professors were fired and more than 4,950 students left the school. The university's second president was Lee Choon-ho (이춘호; 李春昊), who served beginning in October 1947.

The College of Law was founded by merging the law department of Kyŏngsŏng University (Keijō Imperial University) with Kyŏngsŏng Law College. The university absorbed Seoul College of Pharmacy in September 1950, as the college of Pharmacy. This had previously been a private institution.

In 1950, during the Korean War, the university was occupied by North Korea. During which, the Seoul National University Hospital massacre occurred. The university then temporarily moved to Busan and merged with other universities in South Korea.

=== Relocation ===
Originally, the main campus (which embraced the College of Humanities and Sciences and College of Law) was in Dongsung-dong, Jongno District. After the construction of a new main campus in Gwanak District in February 1975, most colleges of the university relocated to the new Gwanak Campus between 1975 and 1979 by the request of president Park Chung Hee who disliked student protests at the site where the Gwanak golf club (founded in the early 1960s and relocated in Hwaseong, Gyeonggi) was formerly located. Part of the former main campus in Jongno District is still used by the College of Medicine, the College of Dentistry and the College of Nursing and is now called Yeongeon Campus.

In 2012, lawmakers reported that the ruling Saenuri Party, prior to the presidential election in December, seriously proposed a plan to relocate the university to the newly established special autonomous Sejong City. The move came as part of an overall effort to decentralize the capital's governmental apparatus. Originally the national government had approached the university in 2009 to host the building of a satellite campus. It was reported the following year that the university had considered withdrawing from the Sejong plan.

== Academics ==
=== Admissions ===
Admissions to SNU are extremely competitive. From 1981 to 1987, when an applicant could apply only to one university at a time, more than 80% of the top 0.5% scorers in the annual government-administered scholastic achievement test applied to SNU and many of them were unsuccessful.

=== Academic structure ===
Sixteen colleges of the university offer 83 undergraduate degree programs. For master and doctoral programs there is one graduate school with 99 programs from five fields of studies. The interdisciplinary programs are the ones invented and operated by more than two departments. In addition to that, there are twelve professional graduate schools.

=== Colleges ===
- College of Humanities
- College of Social Sciences
- College of Business Administration
- College of Education
- College of Fine Arts
- College of Liberal Studies
- College of Human Ecology
- College of Music
- College of Engineering
- College of Natural Sciences
- College of Agriculture & Life Sciences
- College of Medicine
- College of Nursing
- College of Pharmacy
- College of Veterinary Medicine

=== Professional Graduate Schools ===
- Graduate School of Data Science
- Graduate School of Public Health
- Graduate School of Public Administration
- Graduate School of Environmental Studies
- Graduate School of International Studies
- Graduate School of Business
- Graduate School of Convergence Science Technology
- Graduate School of International Agriculture Technology
- Graduate School of Engineering Practice
- School of Law
- School of Dentistry
- School of Medicine

== Campus ==
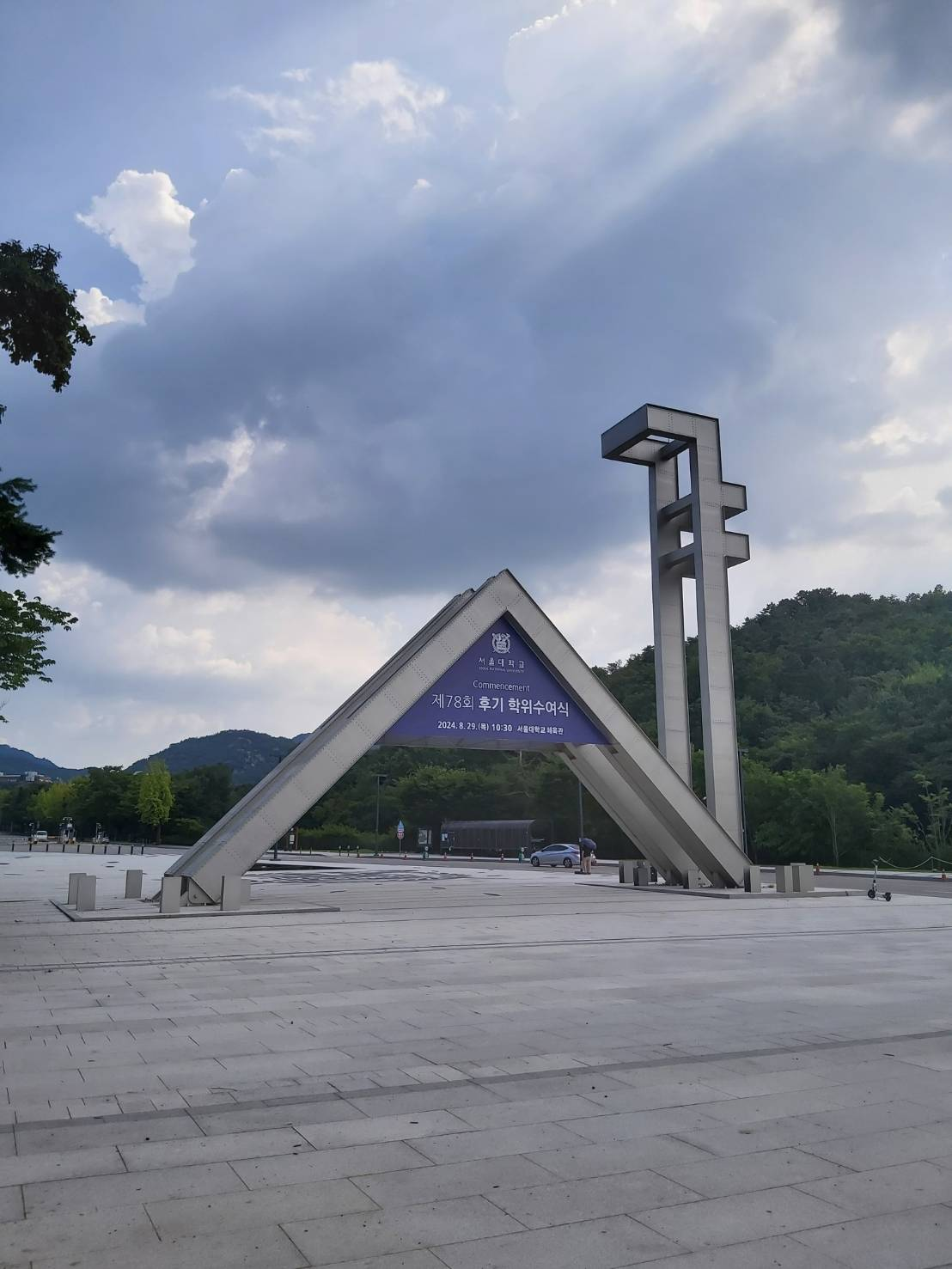
The main entrance of Gwanak campus is a symbolic of SNU

Seoul National University occupies two Seoul-based, one Pyeongchang-based campuses: the Gwanak Campus is situated in 1 Gwanak-ro, Gwanak District; and the Yongon Campus is north of the Han River in Daehangno, Jongno District; and the new Pyeongchang campus in Pyeongchang County, Gangwon Province.

=== Location ===
Gwanak Campus, the main campus, is located in the southern part of Seoul. It is served by its own subway station on Line 2. Yeongeon Campus, the medical campus, is on Daehangno (University Street), northeast Seoul. The defunct Suwon Campus, the agricultural campus, also known as the Sangnok Campus (Evergreen Campus), used to be located in Suwon, about 40 km south of Seoul. The agricultural campus moved to Gwanak in Autumn 2004, but some research facilities still remain in Suwon.

=== Future campus plans ===
In February 2010 Seoul National initiated a memorandum with the city of Siheung to establish a global campus. Signed with the city's mayor and governor of Gyeonggi Province for administrative assistance, the university acquired 826 thousand m^{2} (204 acres) of property in the west-coast economic zone, near the Songdo International Business District, Pyeongtaek harbor, international airport, seaport.

The land acquisition will increase the university's size by 58% over its current 1.4 million square meters (350 acres) to 2.2 million square meters (550 acres) and headcount by an expected 10,000 people or 33% of its current figure. Along with lecture halls and additional liberal arts and graduate courses, the initiative will add a medical complex including a research hospital and training centre, research centre for dentistry and clinical pharmacology, dormitories, apartments, an international middle and high school, and other facilities. Planning to open the international campus in 2014, the university intends to share the initiative with other regional national institutions.

== Facilities ==
=== Library ===
Passageway through the Central Library building

The Seoul National University Library is located behind the university administrative building in the 62nd block of the Gwanak Campus. The chief librarian, Dr. Kim Jong-seo, professor of religious studies in the College of Humanities, took office in 2009. Following the completion of Kwanjeong Library in February 2015, the SNU Library reached a size of 57,747 square meters. As of 2022, the library is home to 5.2 million volumes of books as well as over 260,000 academic journals and e-journals, and over 230,000 non-book materials.

The Central Library has constructed a digital library, which in addition to the regular library collection provides access to university publications, ancient texts, and theses. Included here are images of pamphlets, lecture slides, and insects. The digital library offers access to video of university exhibitions, scientific events, symposia, and seminars.

The library was opened in 1946 as the "Seoul National University Central Library" and inherited its facilities and books from Keijō Imperial University. In 1949, the name of the library was changed to the "Seoul National University Library Annex". When the main branch of the library was relocated to the Gwanak Campus in January 1975, it was renamed the "Seoul National University Library", and then renamed again in 1992 as the "Seoul National University Central Library".

In 1966, provisions were made to systematize the library's collections. The original library was organized into 12 annexes for each of the university's colleges: engineering, education, physics, art, law, theology, pharmacology, music, medicine, dentistry, administration, and agricultural sciences. Two years later, in 1968, libraries for newspapers and the liberal arts were added to bring the number of annexes to 14. However, as the main branch was moved to the Gwanak Campus, the education, physics, legal, theological, administrative, newspaper, liberal arts, and pharmacological libraries were combined in a single building.

=== Kyujanggak ===
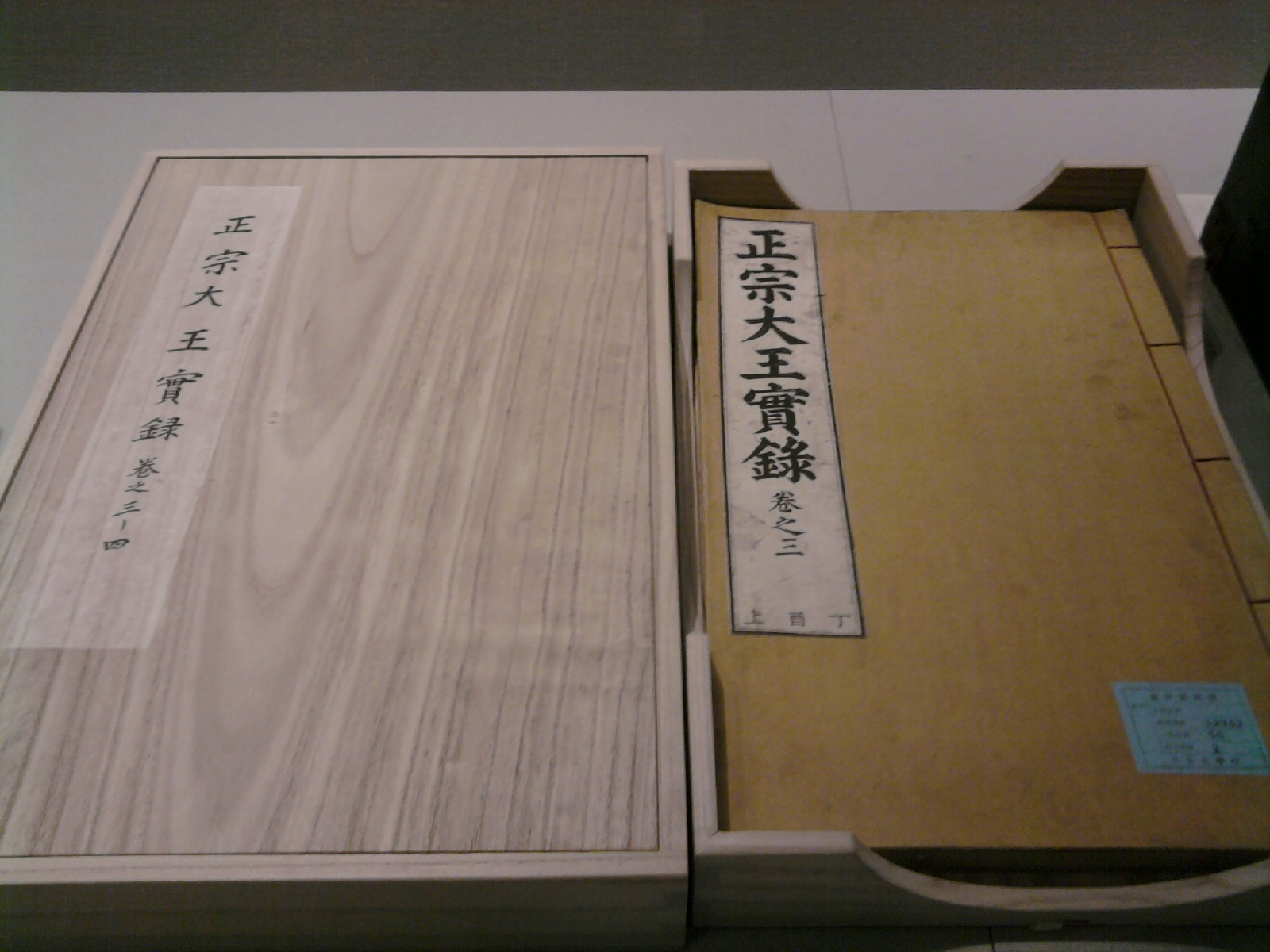
Historical document in the Kyujanggak Archives

The Kyujanggak, also spelled "Gyujanggak", was the royal library during the Joseon period. It was founded in 1776 by order of King Jeongjo of Joseon, at which time it was located on the grounds of Changdeokgung. Today known as Kyujanggak Royal Library or Kyujanggak Archives are maintained by Kyujanggak Institute for Korean Studies (규장각한국학연구원) at SNU. It functions as a key repository of Korean historical records and a centre for research and publication of the annual journal Kyujanggak.

=== Museum ===
Seoul National University Museum is located at the Gwanak Campus. It opened alongside the university in 1946 under the name "The Seoul National University Museum Annex." The original two-story Dongsung-dong building, which was erected in 1941, had served as the Keijō Imperial University Museum until it was transferred intact to SNU. When the museum was moved to the sixth floor of the Central Library, in 1975, it was renamed the "Seoul National University Museum". The museum was then moved to newly constructed facilities, next to the Dongwon Building, in 1993, which it has occupied to this day. Dr. Park Nak-gyu is its director.

=== Museum of Art ===
The new building of the Museum of Art

The Seoul National University Museum of Art (SNUMoA) was established in 1995 with contributions from the Samsung Cultural Foundation after a proposal from Dr. Lee Jong-sang, a professor of Oriental Art. The building was designed by Dutch architect Rem Koolhaas, with construction entrusted to the Samsung Group. The 4,450-square-metre (47,900 ft^{2}) structure lies three stories above and below ground, with its major distinguishing feature, the forward area, cantilevering off the ground. Construction lasted from 2003 to 2005, and the museum opened on June 8, 2006. Dr. Jung Hung-min assumed directorship of the gallery in 2006.

=== Gymnasium ===
The Seoul National University Gymnasium is an indoor sporting arena. The capacity of the arena is 5,000 and was built in 1986 to host table tennis and badminton (demonstration) events at the 1988 Summer Olympics.

=== Dormitory ===
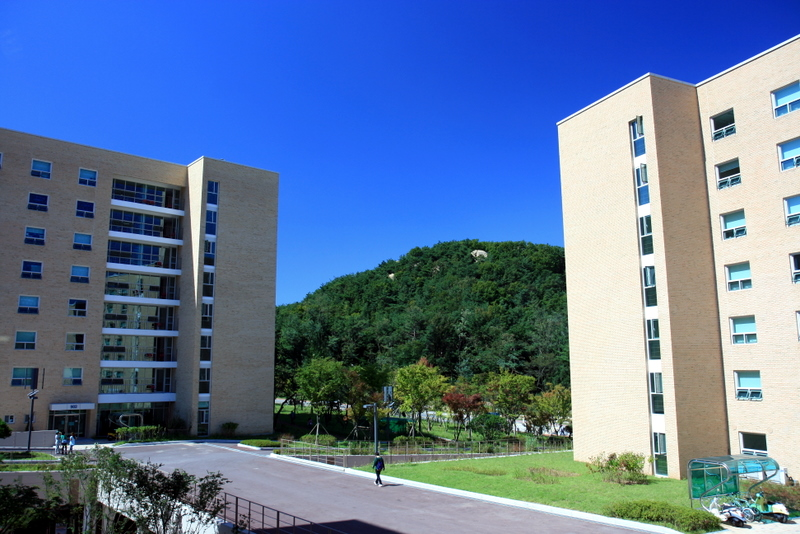
More than 1,300 dorm rooms stand newly renovated at Gwanaksa since September 2010.

The dormitory of SNU is named Gwanaksa (관악사). Dormitories for undergraduate and graduate students as well as families are located here. It was founded August 1975, with five Gwanaksa buildings and one welfare building, which housed 970 male students. The female dormitory was founded in February 1983. By June 2007, there were one administration building, two welfare buildings, 12 undergraduate dormitory buildings, six graduate students' dormitory buildings, which in total housed 3,680 students. Unlike other university dormitories in South Korea, there is no curfew hour.

The dormitory Yeongeonsa is located on the Yeongeon campus, which is the medical school of SNU. Yeongeonsa can house 533 undergraduate students and 17 family households.

=== University Newspaper ===
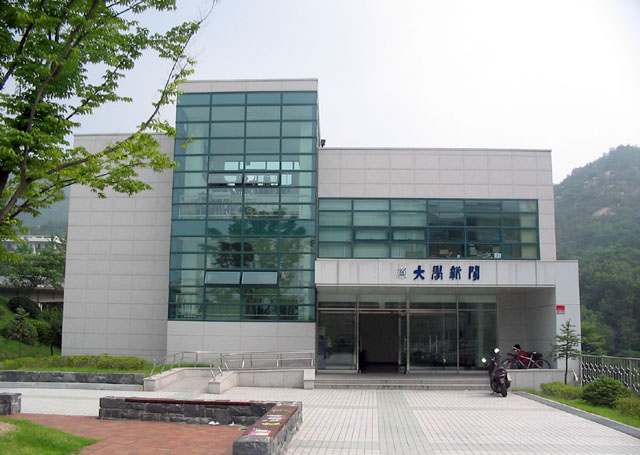
Editorial building of the students' press

The University Newspaper (대학신문; 大學新聞; Daehak Sinmun) is school's student newspaper. The first edition of the paper was launched during the Korean War, on February 4, 1952. In 1953 it was moved to Dongsung-dong in Seoul, where from 1958 even editions for high school were published. Financial difficulties in 1960 led the paper to cease printing for a time. It was relocated to the Gwanak Campus in 1975, where it has been in continuous publication until the present day. At the time of its first launch the paper was sold for 500 won a copy, sometimes twice a week. Now, however, it is distributed for free every Monday. The school paper is not available during schools breaks or exams.

== Reputation and rankings ==
University rankings
JoongAng National	Domestic	1
QS National	General	1
THE National	General	1
ARWU National	Research	1
QS Asia (Asia version)	General	18
THE Asia (Asia version)	General	14
USNWR Asia	General	23
ARWU World	Research	81
QS World	General	=38
THE World	General	=58
USNWR World	General	=133

Official poster of the 60th anniversary in 2006

=== Reputation ===
SNU graduates dominate South Korea's academics, government, politics and business. A KEDI study found that the university's name-value translates into wages that are on average about 12 percent higher than that of any other Korean university. Approximately one in four Korean university presidents obtained their undergraduate degree at SNU. Between 2003 and 2009, more students who graduated from science high schools and received presidential scholarships matriculated at SNU than at eight other leading universities combined.

The chiefs of the government-run College Scholastic Ability Test (CSAT) are mostly SNU graduates.

=== International rankings ===
In 2015, Thomson-Reuters ranked SNU as the 31st most innovative institution in the world. QS World University Rankings (2023) ranked SNU as the 29th best university in the world and 7th in Asia, whilst it is 7th in the independent regional QS Asian University Rankings (2023). SNU is 11th in Asia and 56th in the world according to the 2023 Times Higher Education World University Rankings. In 2023, its World Reputation Rankings were considered it to be 44th globally. Moreover, ARWU (2022) regarded SNU to be among 98th worldwide and the best in the country. CWUR 2020–2021 ranks SNU as 31st best in the world.

QS University Subject Rankings (2018): 25th, Arts and Humanities; 16th, Engineering and Technology; 37th, Life Sciences and Medicine; 21st, Social Sciences and Management; 20th, Natural Sciences.

The institute was ranked 20th in publications by a 2008 analysis of data from the Science Citation Index, and the following year ranked 8th in the world in clinical trials. In 2011, the Mines ParisTech: Professional Ranking World Universities reported that SNU is ranked 10th in the world in terms of the number of alumni holding CEO positions in Fortune 500 enterprises. SNU also had the third highest number of students who went on to earn Ph.Ds in American institutions in 2006.

== Controversies ==
There are issues concerning diversity and racial discrimination against foreign professors at SNU. There was an effort to recruit foreign professors for several years from 2009 onwards, with numbers peaking at 242 or 4% of the total. This number has declined, with a large proportion of the newer "foreign" recruits actually being former South Korean citizens who became naturalized as foreign citizens abroad. Many of the earlier batch of foreign professors left after complaining of racial discrimination against them, sometimes without even giving notice. SNU failed to boost its international reputation by offering contracts to Nobel Prize laureates, but they are mostly retired and holding other academic posts elsewhere, are rarely on campus and sometimes leave before their contracts run out.

== Notable alumni and faculty ==
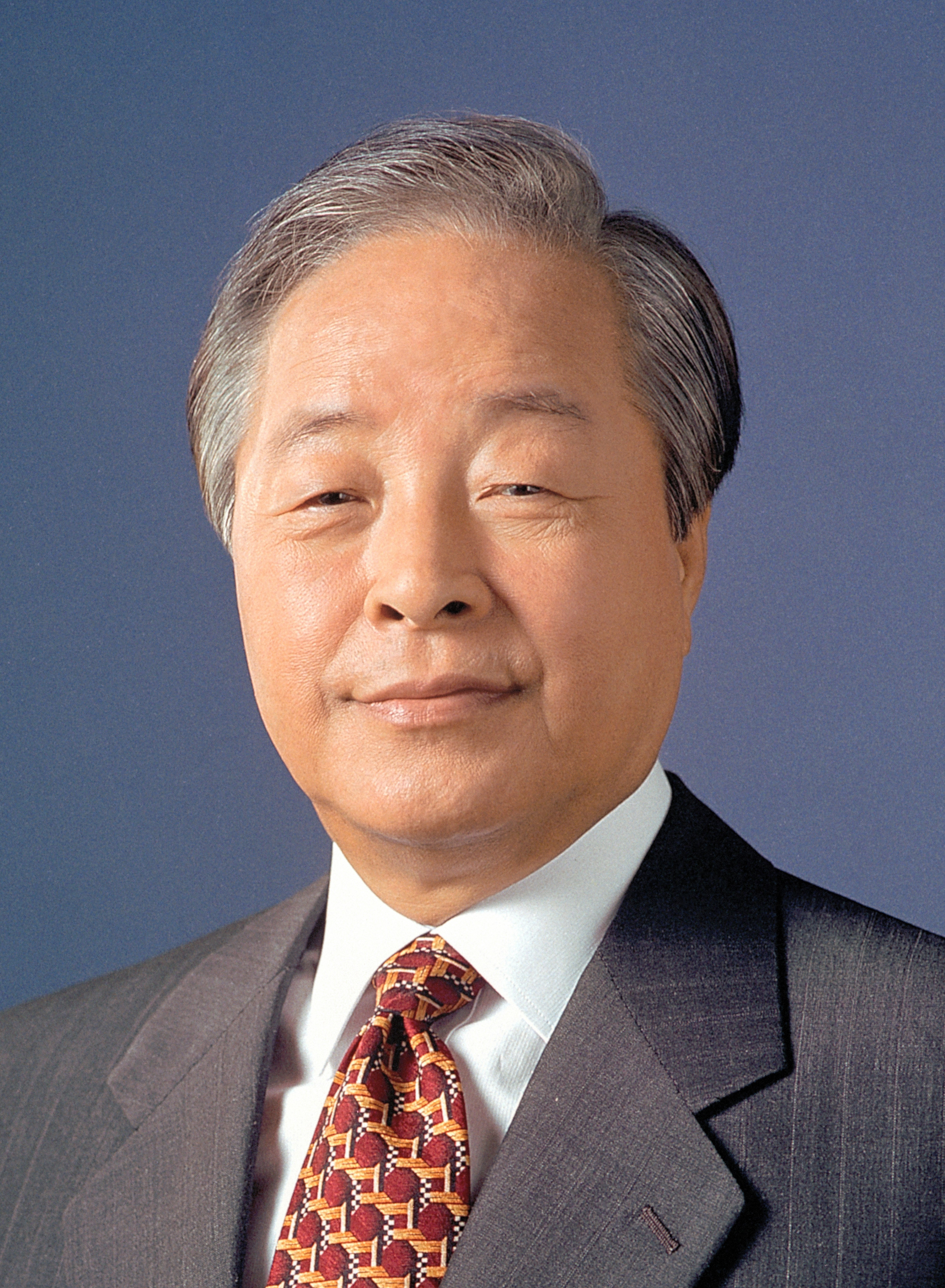
Kim Young-sam, 14th President of South Korea

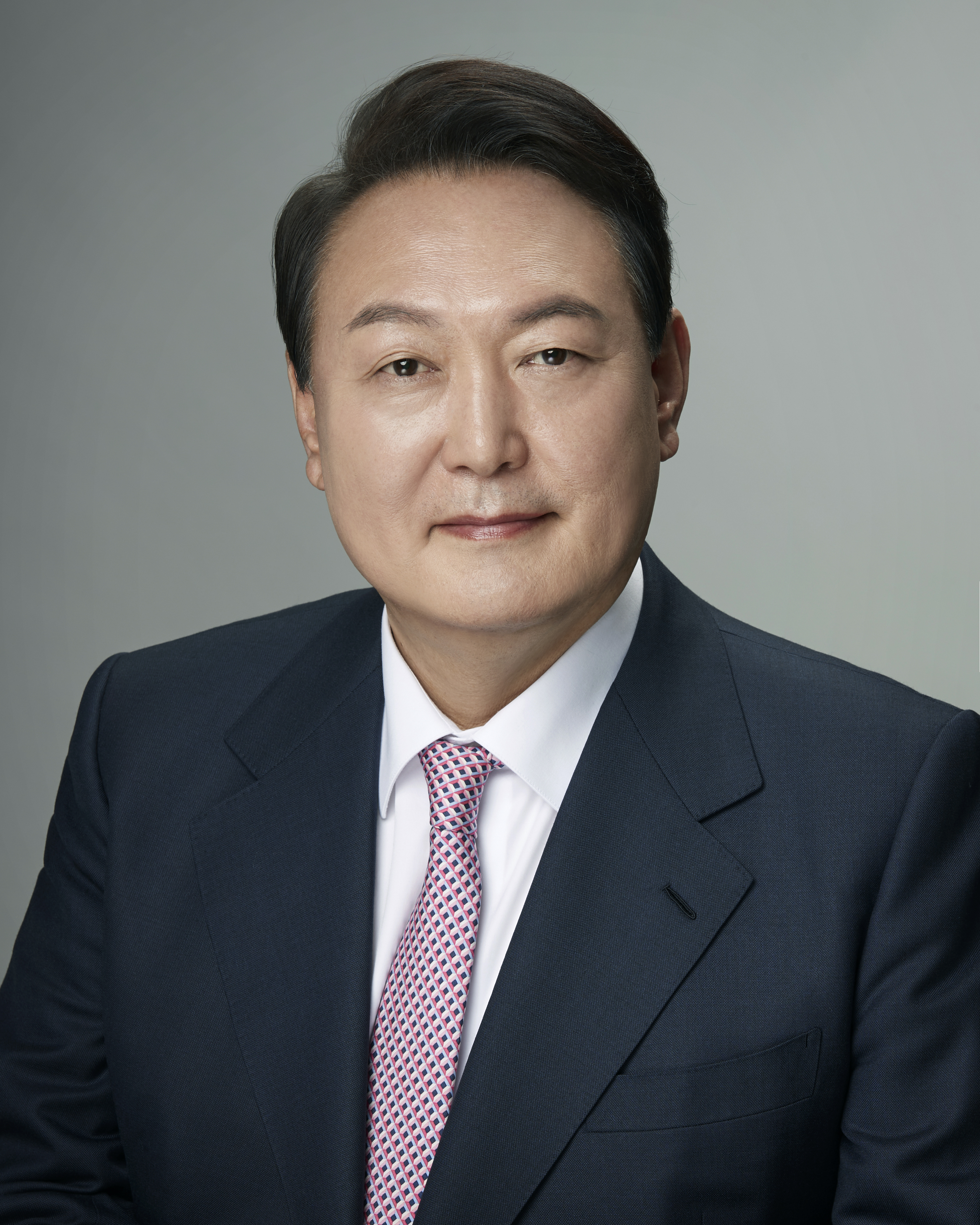
Yoon Suk Yeol, 20th President of South Korea

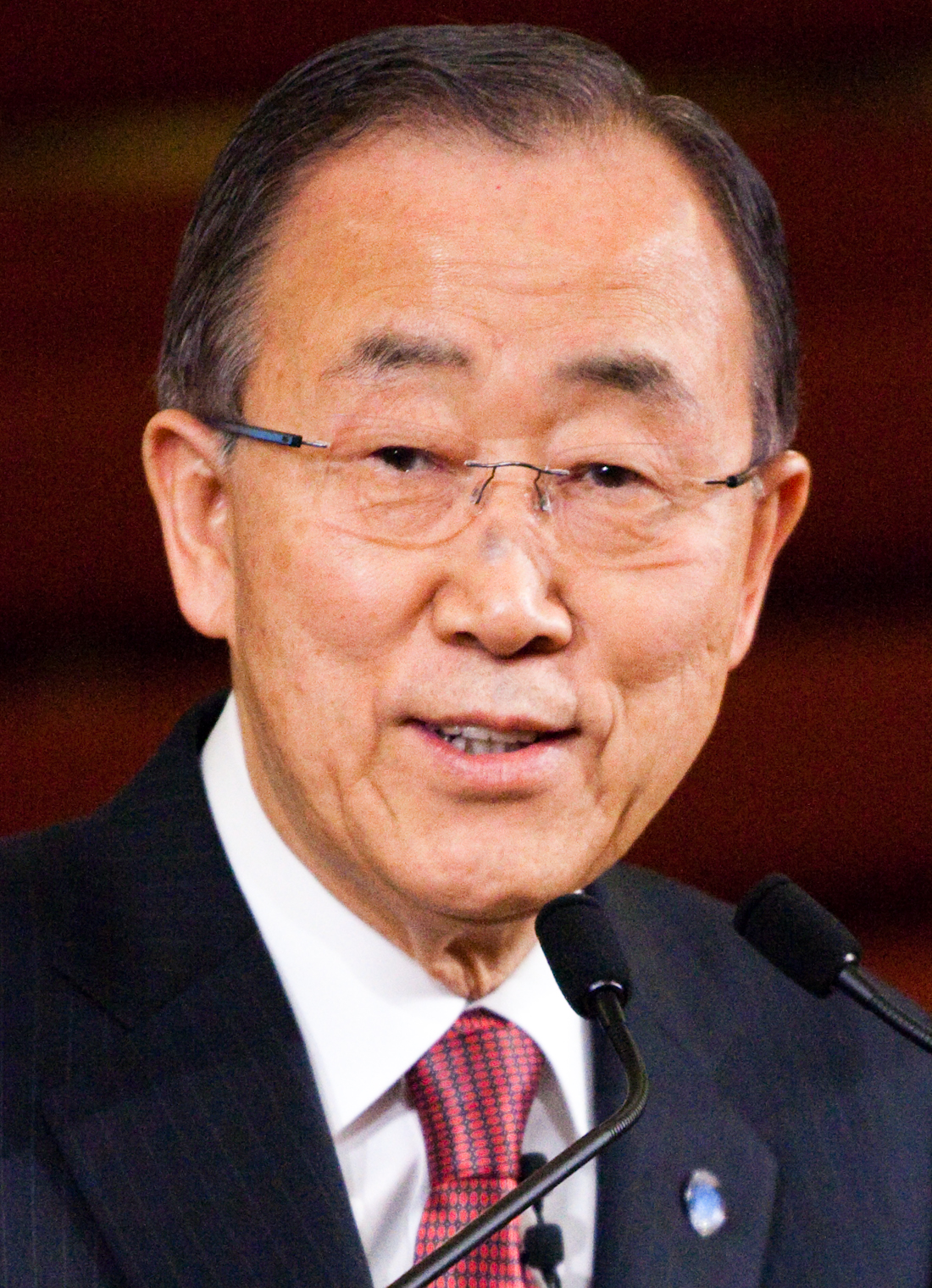
Ban Ki-moon, 8th Secretary-General of the United Nations

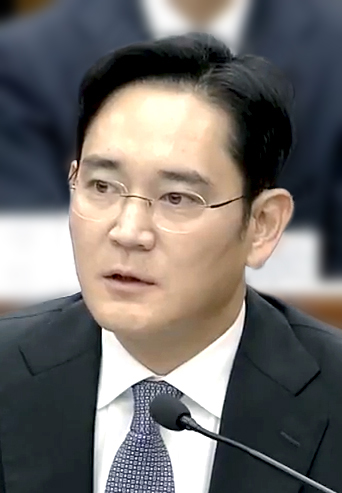
Lee Jae-yong, chairman of Samsung Electronics

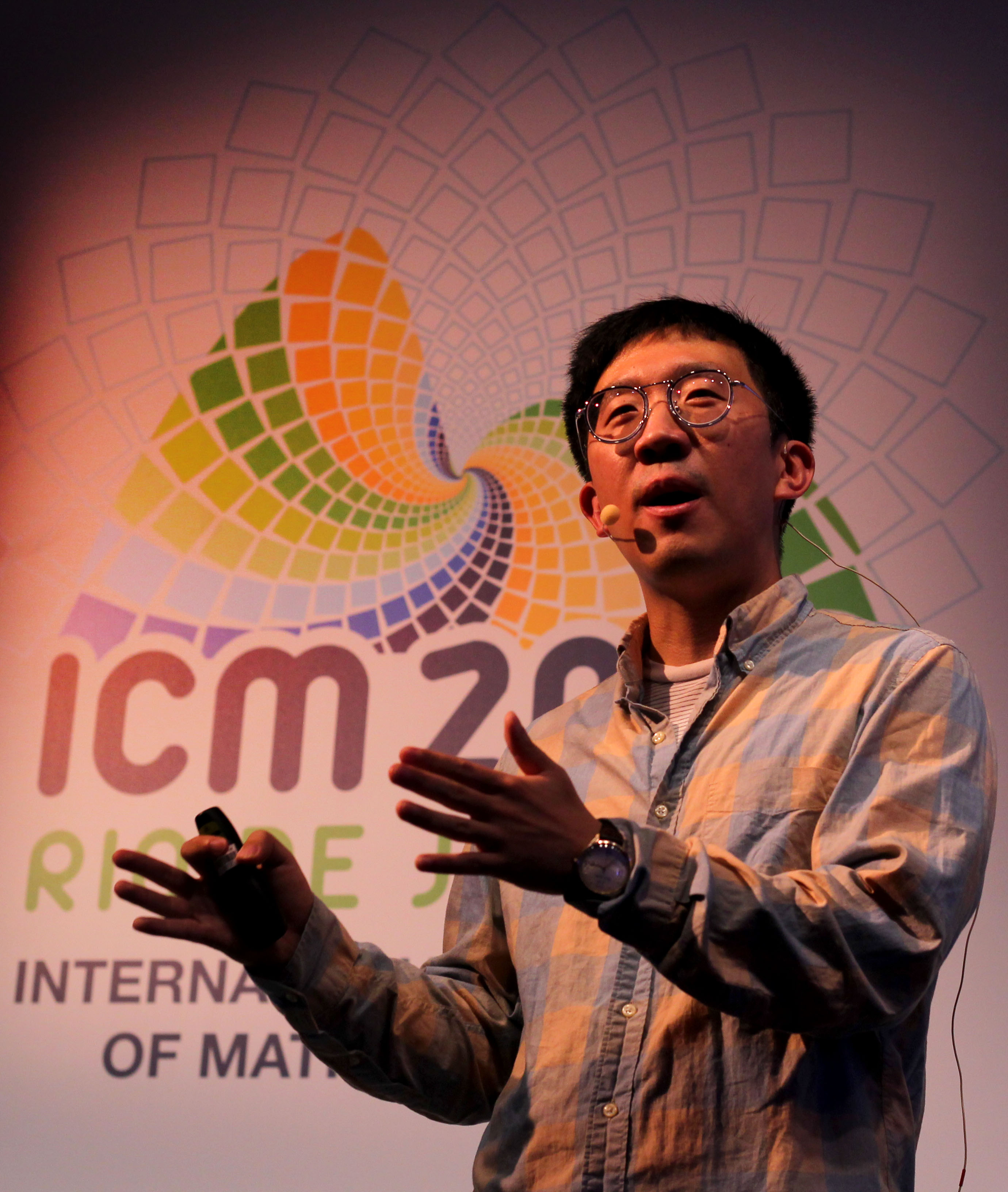
June Huh, 2022 Fields Medalist

Among its notable alumni are prominent figures in international organizations and businesses such as Ban Ki-moon, the eighth secretary-general of the United Nations (UN); Hoesung Lee, chairman of the Intergovernmental Panel on Climate Change (IPCC); Song Sang-hyun, former president of the International Criminal Court (ICC); Lee Jong-wook, the sixth director-general of the World Health Organization (WHO), O-Gon Kwon, former vice president and permanent judge in the International Criminal Tribunal for the former Yugoslavia (ICTY); Kwon Oh-hyun, former CEO and vice chairman of Samsung Electronics; and Bang Si-hyuk, the chairman and founder of HYBE Corporation.

== Symbols ==
The university's logo consists of a laurel wreath symbolizing victory and glory in academic achievement; an open book with the latin words Veritas Lux Mea (Truth is My Light); pen and torch representing determination to lead through academic research; and a shape consisting of stylized depiction of the Hangul letters ㄱ, ㅅ, and ㄷ, the initialism of the university's full name in Korean (국립대학법인서울대학교). The shape of the letters also appears in the main gate of the Gwanak campus.

SNU's other symbols are the Alma Mater song, the Zelkova tree, and the crane bird.

== In popular media ==
- The campus was used as a location for SBS's drama Star's Lover (2008). Specific sites, such as the gallery, Kyujanggak, and museum roads, were filmed to show the university where Kim Chul-soo (Yoo Ji-tae) works, classrooms where he gives his lectures, and the things Lee Ma-ri (Choi Ji-woo) sees and experiences during a school visit. This was the first time the university allowed its campus to be used as a film or TV set.
- In May 2015, the 185th trip of the famous Korean variety show 2 Days & 1 Night helped publicize the university by holding various tasks on the campus in the show's very own fashion.
- In the tvN drama Reply 1988 (2016), Ryu Hye-young portrays Sung Bo-ra, an SNU student majoring in math education.
- In the hit JTBC drama Sky Castle (2018–2019), SNU figures heavily in the plot.
- In Netflix's critically acclaimed and hugely popular series Squid Game (2021), main character Cho Sang-woo's attendance at SNU is a recurring plot point.
- In the tvN drama Hometown Cha-Cha-Cha (2021), main character Hong Du-sik is an SNU graduate.
- In the SBS TV drama The Penthouse: War in Life (2020–2021), many of the characters describe SNU as the ideal university to attend.
- In the tvN drama / Netflix drama, Queen of Tears (2024), male character Baek Hyun Woo is an SNU graduate.

== See also ==
- TEPS
- Education in South Korea
- Flagship Korean National Universities
- Seoul National University station
- List of national universities in South Korea
- List of universities and colleges in South Korea
