= Baek =

- Hangul: 백
- Hanja: 白
- RR: Baek
- MR: Paek

Baek (Korean pronunciation: [pɛk̚]), also often spelled Paek, Baik, Paik, or Back is a Korean family name. In the year 2000, there were 351,275 people with this surname in South Korea. The word means the color white.

== Baek (白) ==
"白" has a Cantonese origin from the Yuan dynasty and Goryeo dynasty.

- Baek Wu Kyung (白宇經) of the Suwon Baek clan, cousin of Bai Juyi of the Tang dynasty, is the origin of this name.

== Baek (苩) ==
Some Baekje refugees from the late Silla age had this surname.

- Paik Ga (苩加), Mahan ruler
- Paik Yong (苩龍), Silla general
- Paik Ki (苩奇), Baekje general
- Paik Ga (苩加), Baekje painter

== Notable people ==
=== Back ===
- Back Hye-ryun (born 1967), South Korean prosecutor-turned parliamentarian
- Back Min-chul (born 1977), South Korean retired football goalkeeper
- Back Sang-won (born 1988), South Korean baseball player

=== Baek ===
- Baek A-yeon (born 1993), South Korean singer and songwriter
- Baek Bong-ki (born 1980), South Korean actor
- Cha-seung Baek (born 1980), Korean-American former professional baseball pitcher
- Baek Dong-hoon (born 1990), South Korean baseball player
- Baek Dong-kyu (born 1991), South Korean football player
- Baek Dong-soo (1743–1816), Korean martial artist and swordsman
- Baek Eun-bi (born 1979), South Korean retired speed skater
- Baek Eun-hye (born 1986), South Korean actress
- Baek Ha-na (born 2000), South Korean badminton player
- Baek Hee-na (born 1971), South Korean author and illustrator
- Baek Hye-jin (born 1983), South Korean wheelchair curler
- Baek Hyun-joo (born 1970), South Korean actress
- Baek Il-joo (born 1985), South Korean swimmer
- Baek Il-seob (born 1944), South Korean actor
- Baek In-chul (born 1961), South Korean retired professional boxer
- Baek In-chun (born 1943), South Korean retired baseball player
- Baek Ji-eun (born 1988), South Korean basketball player
- Baek Ji-heon (born 2003), South Korean singer, member of girl group Fromis 9
- Baek Ji-hoon (born 1985), South Korean football player
- Baek Ji-won (born 1973), South Korean actress
- Baek Ji-young (born 1976), South Korean singer
- Baek Jin-hee (born 1990), South Korean actress
- Baek Jong-bum (born 2001), South Korean football player
- Baek Joo-hee (born 1976), South Korean actress
- Baek Kyu-jung (born 1995), South Korean professional golfer
- Baek Mi-kyung (born 1971), South Korean screenwriter
- Baek Min-hyun (born 1985), South Korean actor
- Baek Minseok (born 1971), South Korean writer
- Baek Mok-hwa (born 1989), South Korean volleyball player
- Baek Mu-san (born 1955), South Korean poet and labor activist
- Baek Nak-jun (1895–1985), South Korean politician
- Baek Nam-chi (1944–2022), South Korean academic and politician
- Baek Ok-dam (born 1986), South Korean actress
- Baek Sang-seo (born 1960), South Korean handball player
- Baek Sang-seung (1935–2018), South Korean politician
- Baek Se-hee (1990–2025), South Korean author
- Baek Seo-yi (born 1992), South Korean actress
- Baek Seung-hee (born 1986), South Korean actress
- Baek Seung-hyeon (born 1975), South Korean actor
- Baek Seung-Jin (born 1982), South Korean political economist and strategist
- Baek Soo-hee (born 1992), South Korean actress
- Baek Su-ho (born 1998), South Korean actor
- Baek Sung-chul (born 1999), South Korean actor and model
- Baek Sung-dong (born 1991), South Korean football player
- Baek Sung-hee (born 1970), South Korean scientist
- Baek Sung-hyun (born 1989), South Korean actor
- Baek Ye-bin (born 1997), South Korean singer-songwriter, member of girl group DIA
- MLMA (born Baek Ye-jin), South Korean artist, rapper, and fashion designer
- Yerin Baek (born 1997), South Korean singer-songwriter
- Baek Yoon-sik (born 1947), South Korean actor
- Baek Young-ok (born 1974), South Korean writer

=== Baik ===
- Insook Baik (born 1950/1951), South Korean-born American gas station owner
- Baik Sou-linne (born 1982), South Korean author
- Baik Tae-ung (born 1963), South Korean lawyer

=== Bek ===
- Bek Hyun-jin (born 1972), South Korean actor, musician, installation artist

=== Paek ===
- Paek Hak-rim (1918–2006), North Korean politician
- Jim Paek (born 1967), Korean-born Canadian ice hockey coach
- Paek Nam-il, North Korean politician
- Paek Nam-nyong (born 1949), North Korean writer
- Paek Nam-sun (1929–2007), North Korean politician
- Paek Sang-ho, North Korean Colonel General
- Paek Se-bong (born 1938), North Korean politician
- Paek Sol-mi, North Korean actress
- Paek Yong-ho (born 1945), North Korean politician

=== Paik ===
- Paik Gahuim (born 1974), South Korean writer
- Jamie Paik, Canadian roboticist
- Paik Jong-won (born 1966), South Korean chef and entrepreneur
- Kun-Woo Paik (born 1946), South Korean pianist
- Paik Kap Yong (South Korean arachnologist)
- Nam June Paik (1932–2006), Korean American artist
- Paik Seung-ho (born 1997), South Korean professional football player
- Paik Sun-yup (1920–2020), South Korean military officer

== Fictional characters ==
- Baek Doo San, character in Tekken fighting games
- Baek Eun-Gi, Ellie, Noah, Kayden and Katie's mother and Joel's ex-wife from the manhwa franchise, Once Upon A Summer, whom Noah sometimes visits but does not like her new family because he was afraid to leave his father.
- Sophie Baek, aka Sophie Gun, from Bridgerton Netflix series.

== See also ==
- Suwon Baek clan
- Baek clan
- Pai (Chinese surname)
