= Brazilian disease =

Concept in economics

Brazilian disease is a term in economics used to describe a structural pattern in which strong productivity growth in land-intensive commodity sectors—particularly agriculture—coexists with weaker productivity growth in urban sectors such as manufacturing and services. The concept is often discussed in relation to Dutch disease, but arises from land abundance rather than from rents from exhaustible natural resources such as oil or gas.

== Earlier usage ==
The phrase "Brazilian disease" appeared in commentary on Brazil's economic situation in the late 2000s, when high global commodity prices led to a strong appreciation of the Brazilian real. At the time, the exchange rate reached around R$1.95 to the US dollar, which raised concerns about the competitiveness of Brazilian manufacturing exports. Commentators drew comparisons to Dutch disease, which refers to similar macroeconomic dynamics observed in the Netherlands in the 1960s and 1970s following large natural gas discoveries.

== Structural interpretation ==
In subsequent academic work, the concept was interpreted more broadly as reflecting structural features of Brazil's development model. Joaquim Bento de Souza Ferreira Filho (University of São Paulo) and Marek Hanusch (World Bank) used the term to describe a growth pattern in which strong productivity growth in land-intensive commodity sectors—particularly agriculture—coexists with weaker productivity growth in urban sectors such as manufacturing and services.

This interpretation links Brazil's economic structure to environmental outcomes, suggesting that weak productivity growth in cities can increase pressure for land expansion and deforestation in the Amazon. Related discussion of these dynamics appears in analyses of the economic drivers of deforestation in Brazil.

The argument was later featured prominently in a World Bank monograph on the economics of Brazil's Amazon region, which examined how structural growth patterns shape development and environmental outcomes across Amazonian states.

== Empirical evidence and growing attention ==
Recent research has provided empirical support for mechanisms highlighted by the Brazilian disease framework. Studies of economic development and deforestation in the Brazilian Amazon suggest that higher levels of development are associated with lower deforestation rates, partly because economic activity shifts away from land-intensive activities toward more urban and diversified economies.

Related research examining the expansion of specific agricultural value chains in the eastern Amazon has also found that some forms of economic development can reduce deforestation while generating economic spillovers associated with more urban and less land-intensive activities.

These findings form part of a growing literature linking structural transformation, urban productivity, and environmental outcomes in Brazil and the wider Amazon region. Work by the Inter-American Development Bank, including the volume Cities in Amazonia: People and Nature in Harmony, emphasizes the importance of strengthening cities as a pathway toward sustainable development in the Amazon. Reflecting this perspective, the Bank has launched the Amazonia Forever Facility for Cities and Resilient Infrastructure, a financing initiative aimed at strengthening urban productivity, infrastructure, and employment in Amazonian cities while reducing pressures on forests.

== See also ==
- Dutch disease
- Resource curse
- Structural transformation
- Deforestation in Brazil
