= In-sook =

- Hangul: 인숙
- RR: Insuk
- MR: Insuk
- IPA: [insʰuk̚]

In-sook, also spelled In-suk or Insook, is a Korean given name. In-sook was the eighth-most popular name for newborn South Korean girls in 1950.

People with this name include:

- Royal Noble Consort Wonbin Hong (1766 – 1779), Korean concubine posthumously titled In-suk
- Tak In-suk (born 1949), North Korean speed skater
- Lee In-sook (born 1950), South Korean volleyball player
- Insook Baik (born 1950/1951), South-Korean born American gas station owner
- Ahn In-sook (born 1952), South Korean actress
- Insook Bhushan (born Na Insook, 1952), South Korean-born American table tennis player
- Hwang In-suk (born 1958), South Korean poet
- Insook Choi (born 1962), South Korean-born American composer
- Kim Insuk (born 1963), South Korean writer
- Kwon In-suk (born 1964), South Korean labour organiser
- Guk In-suk (born 1965), South Korean rower

== See also ==
- List of Korean given names
