= Min-seok =

- Hangul: 민석
- RR: Minseok
- MR: Minsŏk

Min-seok, also spelled Min-suk, is a Korean given name.

People with this name include:

Sportspeople

- Kim Min-suk (swimmer) (born 1979), South Korean swimmer
- Kim Min-seok (table tennis) (born 1992), South Korean table tennis player
- Kim Min-seok (figure skater) (born 1993), South Korean figure skater
- Kim Min-seok (speed skater) (born 1999), South Korean speed skater

Entertainers

- Oh Min-suk (born 1980), South Korean actor
- Kim Min-seok (actor) (born 1990), South Korean actor
- Kim Min-seok (singer, born 1991), South Korean singer-songwriter, member of MeloMance
- Xiumin (born Kim Min-seok, 1990), South Korean singer, member of Exo
- Yoon Min-suk South Korean lyricist who wrote the song "Fucking USA"

Other

- Cho Minsuk (born 1966), South Korean architect
- Baek Minseok (born 1971), South Korean writer
- Jeong Min-suk (born 1978), alias Jeong Yol, South Korean LGBT rights activist

== See also ==
- List of Korean given names
