= Seven O'Clock Breakfast Club for the Brokenhearted =

2025 South Korean film

- Theatrical release poster
- Hangul: 실연당한 사람들을 위한 일곱 시 조찬모임
- RR: Siryeondanghan saramdeureul wihan ilgop si jochanmoim
- MR: Siryŏndanghan saramdŭrŭl wihan ilgop si choch'anmoim
- Directed by: Lim Sun-ae
- Screenplay by: Jeong I-ahn; Lim Sun-ae
- Based on: The 7'O Clock Luncheon for Heartbroken People by Baek Young-ok
- Starring: Bae Suzy; Lee Jin-wook; Yoo Ji-tae; Keum Sae-rok
- Cinematography: Lee Jin-geun
- Edited by: Park Se-young
- Music by: Choi Dong-hoon
- Production companies: W/A Studio; WYSIWYG Studios; Management Soop
- Distributed by: By4M Studio
- Release dates: September 17, 2025 (BIFF); December 30, 2026 (South Korea)
- Running time: 108 minutes
- Country: South Korea
- Language: Korean

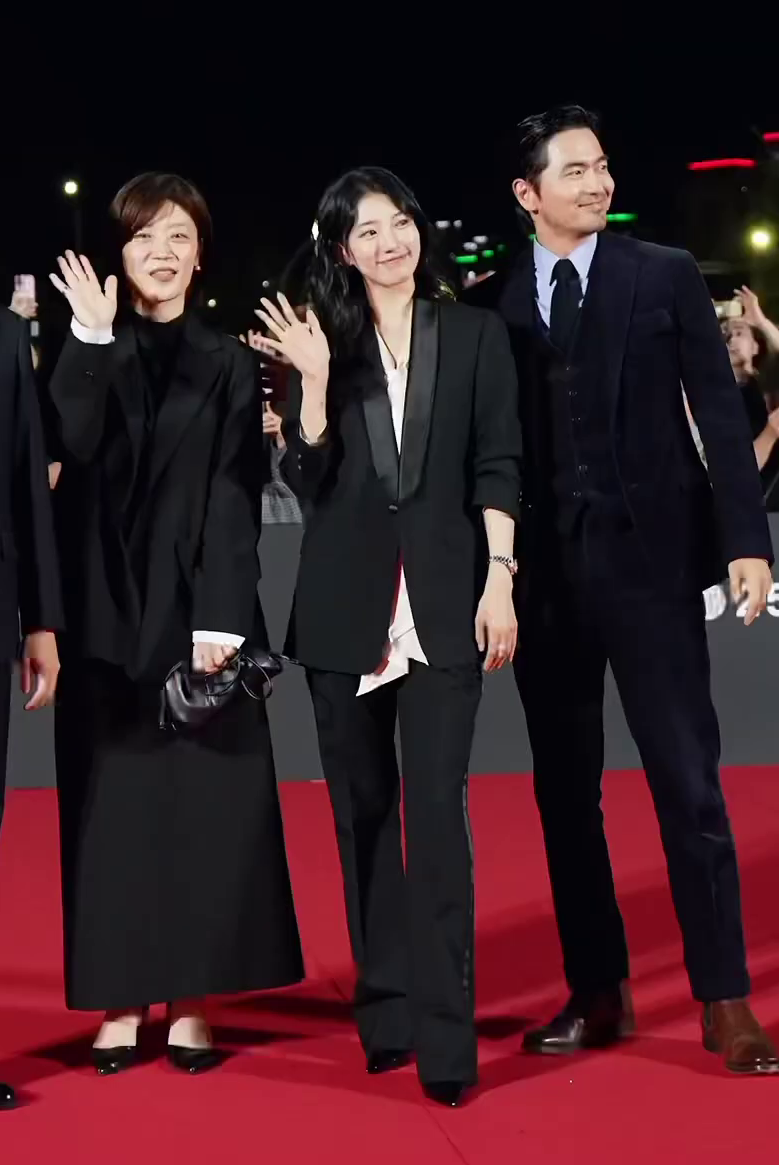
Cast and director at the 2025 Busan International Film Festival.

Seven O'Clock Breakfast Club for the Brokenhearted (Korean: 실연당한 사람들을 위한 일곱 시 조찬모임) is a 2025 South Korean romantic drama film directed by Lim Sun-ae. It is an adaptation of the 2012 novel of the same name by Baek Young-ok. The film had its premiere at the 30th Busan International Film Festival and will release theatrically in South Korea on December 30, 2026.

== Premise ==
The film stars Bae Suzy and Lee Jin-wook as two young Koreans who encounter each other at a breakfast meeting for people who have recently suffered breakups.

== Cast ==
- Bae Suzy as Yoon Sa-gang, a flight attendant
- Lee Jin-wook as Ji-hoon, a consultant instructor
- Yoo Ji-tae as Jeong-su, an airplane pilot
- Keum Sae-rok as Hyeon-jung, a teacher
- Mi Ram as Jeong Mi-do

== Production ==
=== Casting ===
On May 23, 2024, it was reported that Bae Suzy was cast in the lead role of Yoo Sa-gang after being fascinated by the novel early on. Lee Jin-wook was also positively considering the offer to star as Lee Ji-hoon, which would reunite him with Bae after the 2023 Netflix series Doona!. As early as October 2024, Mi Ram was set to play Mi-do, the host of the Breakfast Club.

The film line-up, consisting of Bae, Lee, Yoo Ji-tae, and Keum Sae-rok in the lead roles, and Mi, Jeon Hae-jin, Bae Jong-ok, Lee Sung-wook, Park Se-jin, Lee Ga-sub, and Jeon Seok-chan in supporting roles was announced on January 13, 2025.

=== Filming ===
Filming started on December 29, 2024, and ended in March 2025.

== Release ==
Seven O'Clock Breakfast Club for the Brokenhearted competed in the Competition section of the 30th Busan International Film Festival on September 20, 2025 for 'Bosan Awards'.

It is scheduled to be released in South Korea by By4M Studio on December 30, 2026, with Special Movie City providing distribution support. KT Studio Genie handles overseas sales of the film.

== Awards and nominations ==
Award	Year	Category	Recipient(s)	Result	Ref.
Busan International Film Festival	2025	Busan Awards	Seven O'Clock Breakfast Club for the Brokenhearted	Nominated	
