= Baek Seung-Jin =

South Korean strategist (born 1982)

- 백승진
- Born: 1982 (age 43–44); Seoul, South Korea

Academic background
- Education: Korea University; KDI School of Public Policy and Management; University of Bath
- Influences: Ray Kurzweil; Paul Romer

Academic work
- Discipline: Political economy Sustainable development Structuralist economics
- School or tradition: Endogenous growth theory
- Institutions: United Nations

Seung Jin Baek (Korean: 백승진; born 1982) is a South Korean political economist, author, and endogenous growth theorist, specializing in the political economy of sustainable development. Baek strongly advocates that robust human capital development, coupled with technological innovation, is the most critical endogenous driver for national socio-economic progression. He provides strategic frameworks for nations striving to catalyze structural transformation and escape developmental traps. Over the course of his career, he has held various leadership positions within the United Nations, driving global, regional, and national socio-economic policies.

== Early life and education ==
Born in Seoul, South Korea, in 1982, Baek studied mathematics at Korea University earning qualifications as a U.S. Certified Public Accountant (CPA) and U.S. Associated Person (AP) of the Commodity Futures Trading Commission. He pursued graduate studies in strategy at the KDI School of Public Policy and Management, inspired by futurist Ray Kurzweil to explore the Technology S-Curve. Baek published numerous journal articles applying this concept to strategic management. He later received his Ph.D. in political economy from the University of Bath.

== Career ==
After completing his 26-month military service, during which he worked partly in the Cyber Terror Response Center of the National Police Agency, Baek began his professional career with strategic management and advisory firms, including KPMG, focusing on developing management strategies for various firms. Upon passing the UN Competitive Examination in 2009, he joined the United Nations, primarily focusing on evidence-based policies in development plans, strategies, and frameworks. His roles have included positions at the Economic Commission for Latin America and the Caribbean, the Economic Commission for Africa, the Economic and Social Commission for Western Asia, the Resident Coordinator System, and United Nations Population Fund, where he has held senior leadership positions, playing a pivotal role in driving global, regional, and national socio-economic policies and sustainable development strategies.

In addition to his professional duties, Baek has been actively involved in community and society activities. He has served as a Member of the Global Strategy Special Committee and as the Chairperson of the Middle East Standing Committee for Public Diplomacy of the Peaceful Unification Advisory Council in South Korea. Additionally, he has held the position of executive director at the Korean Association in Lebanon. He has also served as a keynote speaker for various prestigious institutions, including the Ministry of Foreign Affairs, Seoul National University, Korea University, Korean National Police University, and KDI School of Public Policy and Management, and among others.

== Research and policy work ==
Baek's area of policy specialization is at the nexus of sustainable development, structural transformation, and demographic transition strategies. Building upon the discourse of endogenous growth theory, his research argues that nations across the development spectrum must prioritize human capital development to drive structural transformation and escape developmental traps. To advance this framework, he led a flagship publication at the United Nations Population Fund titled Trapped in the Middle: Realizing the ICPD to Address Multidimensional Inequalities and Unlock the Demographic Dividend, which provided human capital-centric strategies for middle-income countries. More recently, he authored a UN policy report, Trapped at the Top: Kuwait's Resource-Rich Paradox and the Economic Diversification Imperative, applying this exact socio-economic model to address the structural vulnerabilities of high-income, resource-dependent states. Beyond his institutional reports, Baek is the author of numerous scholarly journal articles and policy briefs in these fields, a columnist for South Korean newspapers, The Hankyoreh and Maeil Business Newspaper, and the author of four books published by Palgrave Macmillan, Routledge, and South Korean publishers.

== Selected works ==
=== Papers ===
- Armah, Bartholomew; Baek, Seung Jin (2019-05-30). "Prioritising interventions for sustainable structural transformation in Africa: a structural equation modelling approach". Review of Social Economy. 77 (3): 297–325. doi:10.1080/00346764.2019.1602277.
- Baek, Seung Jin (2019-01-10). "Cooperating in Africa's sustainable structural transformation: policymaking capacity and the role of emerging economies". International Development Planning Review. 41 (4). doi:10.3828/idpr.2019.21.
- Armah, Bartholomew; Baek, Seung Jin (2017-01-13). "Can the SDGs Promote Structural Transformation in Africa? An Empirical Analysis". Development. 58 (4): 473–491. doi:10.1057/s41301-016-0049-6. ISSN 1461-7072. S2CID 90354536.
- Chang, Yu Sang; Baek, Seung Jin (2010-06-01). "Limit to improvement: Myth or reality?: Empirical analysis of historical improvement on three technologies influential in the evolution of civilization". Technological Forecasting and Social Change. 77 (5): 712–729. doi:10.1016/j.techfore.2010.02.010. ISSN 0040-1625.

=== Books ===
- Baek, Seung Jin (2021). Structural Transformation and Sustainable Development in the Global South: An Integrated Approach. Routledge. ISBN 9781032195865.
- 백승진 (2019). 어떤 나라에 살고 있습니까: 불평등의 한국 사회 진단과 해법 (in Korean). 다할미디어. ISBN 979-11-8970-679-1.
- Baek, Seung Jin (2018). The Political Economy of Neo-modernisation: Rethinking the Dynamics of Technology, Development and Inequality. Palgrave Macmillan. ISBN 978-3-319-91394-0.
- 백승진 (2013). Are you ready: 준비하라! 내일이 네 인생의 첫날인 것처럼. 아유레디 (in Korean). 홍익출판사. ISBN 978-89-7065-396-9.

== See also ==
- Sustainability
- International political economy
- Institutional economics
