= Lee Yong-woo =

South Korean actor and dancer (born 1981)

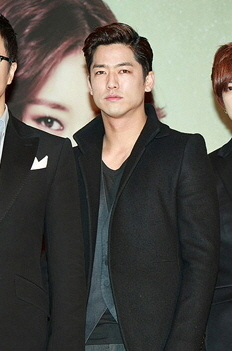
- Lee in February 2012
- Born: April 15, 1981 (age 45); South Korea
- Education: Korea National University of Arts - Dance
- Occupations: Actor; dancer
- Years active: 2001–present
- Agent(s): YG Entertainment (2014–2017)
- Spouse: Unknown (m. 2012)
- Children: 1

Korean name
- Hangul: 이용우
- RR: I Yongu
- MR: I Yongu

Lee Yong-woo (Korean: 이용우; born April 15, 1981) is a South Korean actor and dancer. He graduated from the Korea National University of Arts with a degree in Dance and joined the modern dance company Laboratory Dance Project in 2001. Lee made his acting debut in 2009 and has since starred in television dramas such as Style and Birdie Buddy. He is also one of the coaches/judges (called "masters") in the reality competition show Dancing 9.

== Filmography ==
=== Television series ===
Year	Title	Role	Network
2009	Style	Kim Min-joon	SBS
2011	KBS Drama Special – "Men Cry"	Sung-goo	KBS2
2011	Warrior Baek Dong-soo	Kenzo	SBS
2011	Birdie Buddy	John Lee	tvN
2012	12 Signs of Love	Lee Joon	tvN
2012	The Chaser	PK Joon (Park Ki-joon)	SBS
2014	Ballerino	Lee Seon-woo	MBC Dramanet
2015	Last	Kang Se-hoon	jTBC
2019	Voice	Fujiyama Koichi	OCN
2019	Hot Stove League	Gil Chang-joo	SBS

=== Film ===
Year	Title	Role
2011	My Black Mini Dress	Seok-won
2014	You Are My Vampire	Spy

=== Variety show ===
Year	Title	Network	Notes
2013–15	Dancing 9	Mnet	Master

=== Music video appearances ===
Year	Song title	Artist
2009	"Half"	Hwayobi
2010	"Like a Fool"	Honey Dew
2010	"Will Love Come"	Mighty Mouth feat. Baek Ji-young
2014	"Double Kiss"	Lena Park
2018	"One Shot Two Shot"	BoA

== Stage ==
Year	Title	Role	Notes/Ref.
2010	Tune		
2011	Guys and Dolls	Sky Masterson	
2013	Replica		
2015	Club Salome	—N/a	Choreographer

== Awards and nominations ==
Year	Award	Category	Nominated work	Result
1999	29th Dong-A Dance Competition	Silver Medal, Student category	—N/a	Won
2002	32nd Dong-A Dance Competition	Gold Medal, Overall Male Dancer in Contemporary Dance	—N/a	Won
2009	SBS Drama Awards	New Star Award	Style	Won
