= Style (TV series) =

- Promotional Poster
- Genre: Romance, Drama
- Based on: Style by Baek Young-ok
- Written by: Moon Ji-young; Gu Ji-won
- Directed by: Oh Jong-rok
- Starring: Kim Hye-soo; Lee Ji-ah; Ryu Si-won; Lee Yong-woo
- Country of origin: South Korea
- Original language: Korean
- No. of episodes: 16

Production
- Production companies: Yein E&M

Original release
- Network: Seoul Broadcasting System
- Release: August 1 – September 20, 2009

Style (Korean: 스타일) is a 2009 South Korean television series starring Kim Hye-soo, Lee Ji-ah, Ryu Si-won, and Lee Yong-woo. It aired on SBS from August 1 to September 20, 2009 on Saturdays and Sundays at 21:45 for 16 episodes. Based on the popular 2008 chick lit novel of the same title by former fashion reporter Baek Young-ok, Style depicts the inner workings of a fictional fashion magazine.

== Synopsis ==
Park Ki-ja (Kim Hye-soo) is the perfectionist editor at Style magazine. She's extremely confident, stubborn, and self-centered, but also has a killer fashion sense. In her youth, Ki-ja dreamed of studying at Parsons The New School for Design in New York City, but her hopes were crushed after the Korean economic crisis led her father to commit suicide. Soon after her father's death, Ki-ja's mother moved to Canada, but Ki-ja stayed behind in Korea. At the time she couldn't leave her boyfriend Seo Woo-jin (Ryu Si-won) behind, who was studying to become a doctor. But Woo-jin eventually dropped out of medical school and moved to New York to become a chef. Since that time, Ki-ja has worked her way up from a lowly assistant to a highly respected editor.

Meanwhile, Woo-jin has become a macrobiotic chef and eventually returned to Korea to open a restaurant. His restaurant named Mackerel became a success, especially with the ladies. Woo-jin himself is a ladies man, having good looks and exemplary culinary talents. He then meets Ki-ja again, as well as her assistant Lee Seo-jung (Lee Ji-ah).

Lee Seo-jung has worked as Ki-ja's assistant for over a year, even though she has come close to having a nervous breakdown because of her demanding boss. Seo-jung initially hoped to become a writer, but because of her financial situation took a part-time job at Style magazine. When Seo-jung meets Woo-jin, she becomes enamored with him. She knows that Woo-jin is Ki-ja's ex-boyfriend, but she can't control her feelings for him.

Lastly, Kim Min-joon (Lee Yong-woo) is a photographer at Style magazine. He follows Ki-ja around like a lost puppy dog due to his overwhelming feelings for her. Because of Ki-ja, Min-joon has stayed at Style magazine even when better offers came calling. When Min-joon notices the attention that Woo-jin receives from both Ki-ja and Seo-jung, he feels jealousy.

== Cast ==
=== Main characters ===
- Kim Hye-soo as Park Ki-ja

Park Ki-ja is the editor-in-chief of a famous fashion magazine called Style. Editor Park has a gorgeous appearance as well as outstanding abilities in journalism. However, she has a strange personality and nervous temperament. She is not liked by her underlings because of her excessive passion for work. Her character is similar to Miranda Priestly in The Devil Wears Prada. Editor Park is Lee Seo-jung's boss and clashes with her about everything.

- Lee Ji-ah as Lee Seo-jung

Lee Seo-jung is a 26-year-old assistant for the features section. She is a mere beginner with just one year of experience. However, Seo-jung overcomes the difficulties of working at the bottom of Style's corporate ladder. She has to deal with office politics and fierce competition in the fashion world and the luxury goods industry.

- Ryu Si-won as Seo Woo-jin

Seo Woo-jin is a former plastic surgeon who currently owns a restaurant. He appears in front of Seo-jung just as she is facing the biggest crisis of her life – she is betrayed by her boyfriend whom she has been with for three years. Woo-jin also happens to be Editor Park's ex-boyfriend.

- Lee Yong-woo as Kim Min-joon

Kim Min-joon is a photographer at Style magazine. His character will explore bisexuality through Min-joon's interest in both Ki-ja and Woo-jin.

=== Supporting characters ===
- Na Young-hee as Son Myung-hee
- Choi Gook-hee as Kim Ji-won
- Shin Jung-geun as So Byung-shik
- Han Chae-ah as Cha Ji-sun
- Park Hee-jin as Yoon Jung-hwa
- Han Seung-hoon as Kwak Jae-suk
- Hwang Hyo-eun as Lee In-ja
- Kim Hak-jin as Shim Gyun
- Kim Ga-eun as Wang Mi-hye
- Oh Kyung-jin as Ahn Jin-shil
- Park Ji-il as Lee Suk-chang
- Kim Shi-hyang as Hwangbo Kam-joo
- Hong Ji-min as Oh Yoo-na
- Kim Kyu-jin as Nam Bong-woo
- Kim In-tae as Myung-hee and Woo-jin's father
- Park Soon-chun as Seo-jung's mother
- Kim Yong-rim as Lee Bang-ja

=== Cameo appearances ===
- Jessica Gomes as herself (ep 1)
- Kang Ji-hwan as himself (ep 6)
- Cha Ye-ryun as herself (ep 6)
- Bada as herself (ep 6)
- F.T. Island as themselves (ep 6)
- 2NE1 as themselves (ep 6)
- 2PM as themselves (ep 6)
- Park Sol-mi as Choi Ae-young (ep 7-8)
- Seo In-young as designer Alley (ep 11-12)
- Byun Jung-soo

== International broadcast ==
- It aired in Indonesia on Indosiar during 2009 and dubbed into Bahasa Indonesia.
- It aired in Vietnam on HTV3 from April 10, 2010, under the title Tạp chí thời trang.
- It aired in Thailand on Channel 3 starting February 7, 2014.
