= Paek Tongsu =

Korean martial artist (1743–1816)

- Hangul: 백동수
- Hanja: 白東脩
- RR: Baek Dongsu
- MR: Paek Tongsu

Art name
- Hangul: 야뇌, 인재
- Hanja: 野餒, 靭齋
- RR: Yanoe, Injae
- MR: Yanoe, Injae

Courtesy name
- Hangul: 영숙
- Hanja: 永叔
- RR: Yeongsuk
- MR: Yŏngsuk

Paek Tongsu or Baek Dong-soo (Korean: 백동수; Hanja: 白東脩; 1743–1816) was a Korean martial artist and swordsman of the Suwon Baek clan. He became a folk hero when his group protected King Jeongjo from assassination attempts. He was known as the best warrior in Joseon. He was of low social class because he was a Seo-er (child of a concubine).

== History ==
In 1771, he passed the military service examination but the Joseon government didn't hire him. Given the social climate of the time included discrimination based on social status. In 1773, he gave up on getting an official position and left Seoul to live in seclusion, hiding in a rural village Inje in Gangwon.

In 1788, at the age of 45, Paek Dong-soo was appointed to a government position as the head of the Royal Guards by King Jeongjo, who had just ascended to the throne. From then on, Paek Dong-soo trained elite soldiers for the king while serving as his personal guard. In 1789, King Jeongjo ordered Paek Dong-soo and his two friends, Yi Deok-mu and Park Jae-ga, to write a book on martial arts. Within a year, they completed Muyedobotongji. That book is considered a classic work that combines the best martial arts techniques from across East Asia, featuring detailed illustrations and explanations. It is highly regarded both as literary and as a stand-alone instruction manual East Asian martial arts.

== In popular culture ==
His life became the basis for the Korean comic book "Honorable Baek Dong-soo" written by Lee Jae-hoon which was turned into a television series.

=== Film and television ===
He was portrayed by Ji Chang-wook and Yeo Jin-goo in the 2011 SBS TV series Warrior Baek Dong-soo. He was portrayed by Oh Ji-ho in 2012 film The Grand Heist.

=== Literature ===
The 2010 comic Honorable Baek Dong-soo by Lee Jae-heon, the series is about how Joseon historical figure Baek Dong-soo grew to become a swordsman and folk hero.

== Family ==
- Father:
  - Paek Sa-goeng (백사굉, 白師宏; 1721–1792)
    - Younger brother: Paek Dong-gan (백동간; 白東侃)
- Wife: Lady, of the Jinju Yu clan (부인 진주 유씨, 夫人 晉州 柳氏; 1738–1790)
  - 1st son: Paek Sim-jin (백심진; 白心鎭)
  - 2nd son: Paek Seong-jin (백성진; 白性鎭)

== See also ==
- Korean martial arts
