= Warrior Baek Dong-soo =

2011 South Korean television series

- Promotional poster
- Also known as: The Warrior, Baek Dong-soo
- Hangul: 무사 백동수
- RR: Musa Baek Dongsu
- MR: Musa Paek Tongsu
- Genre: Historical; Action; Romance; Coming of age
- Based on: Honorable Baek Dong-soo by Lee Jae-heon
- Written by: Kwon Soon-kyu
- Directed by: Lee Hyun-jik; Kim Hong-sun
- Starring: Ji Chang-wook; Yoo Seung-ho; Yoon So-yi; Shin Hyun-been; Choi Min-soo; Jun Kwang-ryul
- Music by: Choi Cheol-ho
- Country of origin: South Korea
- Original language: Korean
- No. of episodes: 29 (+1 special)

Production
- Producer: Jo Nam-kook (SBS)
- Production location: Korea
- Production companies: K-PAX, saramin.co.kr

Original release
- Network: Seoul Broadcasting System
- Release: 4 July – 10 October 2011

Warrior Baek Dong-soo (Korean: 무사 백동수) is a 2011 South Korean fusion historical/action television series starring Ji Chang-wook in the title role, with Yoo Seung-ho, Yoon So-yi, Shin Hyun-been, Choi Min-soo and Jun Kwang-ryul. It aired on SBS from July 4 to October 10, 2011, on Mondays and Tuesdays at 21:55 (KST) for 29 episodes.

Based on the 2010 comic Honorable Baek Dong-soo by Lee Jae-heon, the series is about how Joseon historical figure Baek Dong-soo grew to become a swordsman and folk hero. Baek was one of the three authors of Muyedobotongji, a pivotal martial arts work commissioned by King Jeongjo.

== Synopsis ==
Set against the backdrop of political maneuverings in Joseon between different factions, namely those led by King Jeongjo (Hong Jong-hyun), by the Qing ambassador, by the Japanese swordsman Kenzo (Lee Yong-woo), and the assassin's guild Heuksa Chorong, the series is a coming-of-age drama about brotherhood, friendship, loyalty and honor.

== Cast ==
=== Main ===
- Ji Chang-wook as Baek Dong-soo
  - Yeo Jin-goo as young Dong-soo

A carefree swordsman who alters the fate of the nation as a member of the royal guard.

- Yoo Seung-ho as Yeo Woon
  - Park Gun-woo as young Woon

Son of Yeo Cho-sang. Dong-soo's friend and seeming nemesis. He lives in the shadows as the mole for a mysterious assassin collective aiming to overthrow the dynasty.

- Yoon So-yi as Hwang Jin-joo
  - Lee Hye-in as young Jin-joo

Dong-soo's childhood friend. Daughter of Ji / Ga-Ok and Kim Gwang-taek.

- Shin Hyun-been as Yoo Ji-sun
  - Nam Ji-hyun as young Ji-sun

Consort of Prince Sado, and later love interest of Dong-soo and Woon.

- Choi Min-soo as Chun

Leader of assassin's guild Heuksa Chorong, and Yeo Woon's mentor.

- Jun Kwang-ryul as Kim Gwang-taek

Joseon's top swordsman, and Dong-soo's mentor.

=== Supporting ===
- Hong Jong-hyun as King Jeongjo
- Park Jun-gyu as Heuk Sa-mo, Baek Dong-soo's guardian.
- Park Won-sang as Jang Dae-pyo, leader of the training camp.
- Lee Jin-ah as Jang-mi, Heuk Sa-mo's love interest.
- Yoon Ji-min as Ji / Ga-Ok, love interest of Chun and Kim Gwang-taek; mother of Jin-joo.
- Park Chul-min as In / Dae Ung, one of the three leaders of Heuksa Chorong.
- Oh Man-seok as Crown Prince Sado
- Jeon Guk-hwan as King Yeongjo
- Geum Dan-bi as Queen Jeongsun
- Lee Won-jong as Hong Dae-ju, Joseon's Minister of State and the series' principal villain.
- Jung Ho-bin as Im Soo-woong, right-hand man to Prince Sado.
- Ahn Suk-hwan as Seo Yoo-dae, a Joseon general and loyal ally of Prince Sado.
- Kim Dong-kyun as Boo Gwan, Hong Dae-ju's incompetent deputy.
- Choi Jae-hwan as Yang Cho-rip or Hong Guk-yeong, friend of Dong-soo and Woon.
  - Shin Dong-woo as young Cho-rip
- Um Hyo-sup as Baek Sa-geong
- Kim Hee-jung as Lady Park
- Lee Kye-in as Yeo Cho-sang, Yeo Woon's father.
- Sung Ji-ru as Hwang Jin-gi, Jin-joo's adoptive father.
- Kim Da-hyun as Kim Hong-do, painter and ally of Dong-soo. He is romantically interested in Jin-joo.
- Kim Eung-soo as Yoo So-kang
- Ji Yoo as Jang Mi-so, daughter of Jang Dae-pyo, and later love interest of Cho-rip.
- Im Kang-sung as Hong Sa-hye, son of Hong Dae-ju.
- Choi Yoon-so as Goo-hyang, palace lady that helps Yeo Woon when he becomes Sky Lord.
- Lee Si-eon as Dae-heung
- Lee Yong-woo as Kenzo, a Japanese samurai.
- Choi Yoo-sung
- Jo Woo-jin as Ma Do-shik

== Original soundtrack ==
Warrior Baek dong soo OST

Soundtrack album by Various artists
- Recorded: 2011
- Genre: Soundtrack
- Language: Korean
- Label: Danal; Star Entry Entertainment

=== Part 1 ===
Released on July 4, 2011
| No. | Title | Artist | Length |
|---|---|---|---|
| 1. | "Yanoi (Song ver.)" (야뇌) | BMK | 5:04 |
| 2. | "Yanoi (Song ver.)" (Inst.) | | 5:04 |
| 3. | "Yanoi (Drama ver.)" | | 5:04 |
| 4. | "Yanoi (Drama ver.)" (Inst.) | | 5:04 |
| Total length: | | | 20:16 |

=== Part 2 ===
Released on July 18, 2011
| No. | Title | Artist | Length |
|---|---|---|---|
| 1. | "For One Day" (단하룸나) | Yesung | 4:52 |
| 2. | "For One Day" (Inst.) | | 4:52 |
| Total length: | | | 8:04 |

=== Part 3 ===
Released on July 20, 2011
| No. | Title | Artist | Length |
|---|---|---|---|
| 1. | "Stagnant" (고여) | Shin Sung-woo | 4:27 |
| 2. | "Stagnant" (Inst.) | | 4:27 |
| Total length: | | | 8:54 |

=== Part 4 ===
Released on June 4, 2011
| No. | Title | Artist | Length |
|---|---|---|---|
| 1. | "The Only Road" (유일한길) | Boohwal | 3:47 |
| 2. | "The Only Road" (Inst.) | | 3:47 |
| Total length: | | | 7:01 |

=== Part 5 ===
Released on June 26, 2011
| No. | Title | Artist | Length |
|---|---|---|---|
| 1. | "I'm Here" (내강씨죠) | Seo Young-eun | 3:44 |
| 2. | "I'm here" (Inst.) | | 3:44 |
| Total length: | | | 7:00 |

=== Part 6 ===
Released on August 16, 2011
| No. | Title | Artist | Length |
|---|---|---|---|
| 1. | "Falling In Love" (사랑에) | Kim Tae-woo | 3:53 |
| 2. | "Falling In Love" (Inst.) | | 3:53 |
| Total length: | | | 7:06 |

=== Part 7 ===
Released on August 23, 2011
| No. | Title | Artist | Length |
|---|---|---|---|
| 1. | "My Heart is Going Crazy" (심장이미져서) | Shin Jae | 4:04 |
| 2. | "My Heart is Going Crazy" (Inst.) | | 4:04 |
| Total length: | | | 8:08 |

=== Part 8 ===
Released on August 29, 2011
| No. | Title | Artist | Length |
|---|---|---|---|
| 1. | "Because Of Love" (사링때문에) | Han Seung-yeon | 4:40 |
| 2. | "Because Of Love" (Inst.) | | 4:40 |
| Total length: | | | 9:20 |

=== Part 9 ===
Released on September 5, 2011
| No. | Title | Artist | Length |
|---|---|---|---|
| 1. | "Meet Again" (다시만나면) | Ji Chang-wook | 4:05 |
| 2. | "Meet Again" (Inst.) | | 4:05 |
| Total length: | | | 8:10 |

Disc 2:
| No. | Title | Artist | Length |
|---|---|---|---|
| 1. | "Opening theme" | Various Artists | 3:21 |
| 2. | "A Battlefield" | Various Artists | 4:42 |
| 3. | "Childhood Rebellion" | Various Artists | 3:56 |
| 4. | "Fate" | Various Artists | 2:05 |
| 5. | "Great Northern Expedition" | Various Artists | 2:50 |
| 6. | "Go Soo-ryun" | Various Artists | 2:41 |
| 7. | "Friends of Friends" | Various Artists | 2:38 |
| 8. | "Green Frog" | Various Artists | 2:24 |
| 9. | "Heuk So Cho Rong" | Various Artists | 4:28 |
| 10. | "Moon Slicing Sword" | Various Artists | 2:27 |
| 11. | "Mountains Of The Moon" | Various Artists | 3:44 |
| 12. | "Sudden Rain" | Various Artists | 4:20 |
| 13. | "Sorrow Song" | Various Artists | 4:44 |
| 14. | "Warrior Baek Dong-soo" | Various Artists | 2:53 |
| 15. | "The Warriors" | Various Artists | 2:48 |
| 16. | "Warrior Guard" | Various Artists | 3:25 |

== Ratings ==
In the table below, the blue numbers represent the lowest ratings and the red numbers represent the highest ratings.

| Ep. | Original broadcast date | Average audience share | | | |
| Ep. | Original broadcast date | Nielsen Korea | | TNmS | |
| Ep. | Original broadcast date | Nationwide | Seoul | Nationwide | Seoul |
|---|---|---|---|---|---|
| 1 | July 4, 2011 | 10.1% | 10.6% | 8.6% (17th) | 10.3% (9th) |
| 2 | July 5, 2011 | 10.6% | 11.0% | 10.2% (8th) | 12.1% (7th) |
| 3 | July 11, 2011 | 12.7% | 12.5% | 12.4% (4th) | 13.4% (5th) |
| 4 | July 11, 2011 | 13.7% | 14.0% | 14.0% (4th) | 14.9% (6th) |
| 5 | July 18, 2011 | 14.3% | 15.8% | 15.0% (3rd) | 16.8% (2nd) |
| 6 | July 19, 2011 | 15.0% | 15.9% | 16.5% (3rd) | 18.1% (1st) |
| 7 | July 25, 2011 | 14.5% | 14.0% | 17.9% (3rd) | 20.7% (1st) |
| 8 | July 26, 2011 | 16.7% | 16.8% | 18.4% (3rd) | 20.2% (1st) |
| 9 | August 1, 2011 | 16.3% | 16.6% | 17.6% (3rd) | 18.0% (3rd) |
| 10 | August 2, 2011 | 17.4% | 17.6% | 16.5% (3rd) | 16.4% (1st) |
| 11 | August 8, 2011 | 16.1% | 16.7% | 16.7% (3rd) | 18.8% (2nd) |
| 12 | August 9, 2011 | 15.9% | 16.1% | 16.3% (3rd) | 16.3% (4th) |
| 13 | August 15, 2011 | 17.3% | 18.0% | 18.7% (3rd) | 20.9% (1st) |
| 14 | August 16, 2011 | 17.7% | 17.9% | 18.7% (2nd) | 21.6% (1st) |
| 15 | August 22, 2011 | 17.5% | 18.1% | 17.7% (3rd) | 19.5% (1st) |
| 16 | August 23, 2011 | 17.8% | 18.5% | 17.8% (3rd) | 19.9% (2nd) |
| 17 | August 29, 2011 | 17.3% | 18.0% | 19.3% (3rd) | 21.5% (1st) |
| 18 | August 30, 2011 | 17.6% | 18.4% | 18.8% (2nd) | 20.3% (1st) |
| 19 | September 5, 2011 | 17.8% | 18.2% | 17.8% (3rd) | 18.2% (3rd) |
| 20 | September 6, 2011 | 17.0% | 16.8% | 17.9% (3rd) | 19.4% (2nd) |
| 21 | September 12, 2011 | 14.8% | 15.9% | 15.6% (3rd) | 15.7% (3rd) |
| 22 | September 13, 2011 | 16.9% | 17.4% | 16.6% (3rd) | 17.5% (2nd) |
| 23 | September 19, 2011 | 17.8% | 19.2% | 18.9% (3rd) | 19.7% (3rd) |
| 24 | September 20, 2011 | 18.5% | 20.5% | 18.2% (3rd) | 19.2% (3rd) |
| 25 | September 26, 2011 | 17.1% | 18.2% | 17.0% (3rd) | 18.9% (3rd) |
| 26 | September 27, 2011 | 16.9% | 17.8% | 17.4% (3rd) | 19.8% (3rd) |
| 27 | October 3, 2011 | 15.3% | 16.6% | 16.8% (3rd) | 18.2% (3rd) |
| 28 | October 4, 2011 | 18.2% | 18.8% | 19.3% (2nd) | 21.5% (2nd) |
| 29 | October 10, 2011 | 17.9% | 19.7% | 17.8% (3rd) | 19.8% (2nd) |
| Average | | 16.1% | 16.7% | 16.7% | 18.2% |
| Special | October 11, 2011 | 11.2% | 12.7% | 9.9% (13th) | 11.0% (9th) |

== Awards and nominations ==
| Year | Award | Category | Recipient | Result |
|---|---|---|---|---|
| 2011 | SBS Drama Awards | Top Excellence Award, Actor in a Special Planning Drama | Choi Min-soo | Nominated |
| 2011 | SBS Drama Awards | Excellence Award, Actor in a Special Planning Drama | Jun Kwang-ryul | Won |
| 2011 | SBS Drama Awards | Excellence Award, Actress in a Special Planning Drama | Yoon So-yi | Won |
| 2011 | SBS Drama Awards | Special Acting Award, Actor in a Special Planning Drama | Lee Won-jong | Nominated |
| 2011 | SBS Drama Awards | Special Acting Award, Actor in a Special Planning Drama | Park Chul-min | Nominated |
| 2011 | SBS Drama Awards | Special Acting Award, Actress in a Special Planning Drama | Yoon Ji-min | Nominated |
| 2011 | SBS Drama Awards | New Star Award | Ji Chang-wook | Won |
| 2011 | SBS Drama Awards | New Star Award | Shin Hyun-bin | Won |
