= Dancing 9 =

South Korean television show

- Promotional poster
- Hangul: 댄싱 9
- RR: Daensing 9
- MR: Taensing 9
- Presented by: Oh Sang-jin
- Country of origin: South Korea
- Original language: Korean
- No. of seasons: 3
- No. of episodes: 25

Production
- Production company: SM C&C

Original release
- Network: Mnet; Channel M (SE Asia)
- Release: July 20, 2013 – June 5, 2015

Dancing 9 (Korean: 댄싱9) is a South Korean dance survival program by Mnet. 18 contestants are divided into two teams, Blue Eye and Red Wings with 9 members each. A live performance each week where the two teams perform will determine the winner. A prize of 100 million won will be given to the winning team with 300 million won worth of support for dance performances. The person chosen as the MVP will also receive a 100 million won worth of additional benefits.

The two teams also have coaches or masters who are dance experts in a specific field.

The show is hosted by Oh Sang-jin and the theme song of the show was sung by SPICA.

== Season 1 ==
=== Masters ===
Blue Eye	Red Wings
Lee Yong Woo	Woo Hyun Young
Park Ji Eun	Park Ji Woo
Ducky	Poppin J
Yuri	Lee Min Woo
Hyoyeon	

=== Teams ===
==== Blue Eye ====
- Captain: Eum Moon-suk (32) - Krumping
  - Lee Eun-hye (20) - Dancesport
  - Lee Ji-eun (20) - Jazz Dance
  - Kim Soo-ro (27) - Dancesport
  - Hong Sung-sik (30) - B-boying
  - Kim Sol-hee (20) - Krumping
  - Kim Myung-gyu (28) - Modern Ballet
  - Han Sun-chun (25) - Modern Dance
  - Lee Jun-yong (30) - Hip-Hop

==== Red Wings ====
- Captain: Ha Hui-dong (35) - B-boying
  - Yeo Eun-ji (22) - Waacking
  - So Mun-jung (18) - Dancesport
  - Kim Hong-in (19) - Dancesport
  - So Young-mo (33) - Street Dance
  - Nam Jin-hyun (24) - Modern Dance
  - Lee Sun-tae (26) - Modern Dance
  - Lee Luda (28) - Ballet
  - Ryu Jin-wook (31) - Modern Dance

On the show's finale which was held on October 6, 2013, Red Wings was declared the winner of the two teams and Red Wings' Ha Hui-dong from the B-boy group T.I.P was declared the MVP.

== Season 2 ==
Mnet announced that the show would be returning for another season and has opened up a global casting call. Red Wings masters from the first season Lee Min-woo, Woo Hyun-young and Park Ji-woo would be returning as masters for Red Wings. Season 1 winner Ha Hui-dong would be joining them. On April 1, 2014, Mnet released a teaser introducing Jay Park (Park Jae-bum) as Blue Eye's new street and K-pop master. He will be joining Park Ji-eun and Lee Yong-woo who returned as Blue Eye's masters for the second season and another new dance master, actor Kim Soo-ro. The show's second season premiered on June 13.

Red Wings and Blue Eye logos

=== Masters ===
Blue Eye	Red Wings
Lee Yong-woo	Woo Hyun-young
Park Ji-eun	Park Ji-woo
Kim Soo-ro	Ha Hui-dong
Jay Park	Lee Min-woo

=== Teams ===
==== Blue Eye ====
- Captain: Yoon Jeon-il (28) - Ballet
  - Kim Seol-jin (34) - Modern Dance
  - Ahn Nam-geun (29) - Modern Dance
  - Kim Ki-soo (28) - B-boying
  - Lee Ji-eun (30) - Dancesport
  - Im Saet-byul (28) - Modern Dance
  - Kim Tae-hyun (25) - Krumping
  - Park In-soo (23) - B-boying
  - Choi Nam-mi (22) - Waacking

==== Red Wings ====
- Captain: Shin Kyu-sang (30) - B-boying
  - Son Byung-hyun (32) - House
  - Lee Yoon-hee (30) - Modern Dance
  - Choi Soo-jin (30) - Modern Dance
  - Kim Kyung-il (28) - Modern Dance
  - Lee Yoo-min (29) - Locking
  - Yoon Na-ra (26) - Modern Dance
  - Ahn Hye-sang (24) - Dancesport
  - Park Jung-eun (18) - Street Dance

=== Final Battles ===
==== Pre-1st Final Battle ====
Opponent team pick songs

Round	Category	Team	Contestant	Song
1	Girl's Dance	Red Wings	Choi Soo-jin, Park Jung-eun, Lee Yoon-hee, Ahn Hye-sang	포기하지마 - 성진우 (Don't Give Up - Song Jin-woo)
1	Girl's Dance	Blue Eye	Im Saet-byul, Lee Ji-eun, Choi Nam-mi	붉은 노을 - 빅방 (Sunset Glow - Big Bang)
2	Boy's Dance	Red Wings	Kim Kyung Il, Shin Kyu Sang, Son Byung Hyeon, Yoon Nara, Lee Yoo Min	기대해 - 걸스데이 (Expectation - Girl's Day)
2	Boy's Dance	Blue Eye	Kim Seol-jin, Park In-soo, Kim Ki-soo, Kim Tae-hyun, Ahn Nam-geun, Yoon Jeon-il	짧은 치마 - AOA (Short Skirt - AOA)
3	Team Dance	Red Wings	RED9	Let's Go - Travis Barker
3	Team Dance	Blue Eye	BLUE9	Ring the Alarm - Beyoncé

- MC: Din-Din
- DJ: Jung Jin-wook
- Judge: Cha Jin-yeob, Lee Yoon-kyung, Hong Se-Jung, Kim Yong-soo, Lee Woo-Sung, Kim Hak-soo (G-haksu), Jo Seung-ho
- Theme: Water Dance
- Result: Red Wings vs Blue Eye (1-6) Blue Eye WIN, Blue Eye got score 3 for 1st Final Battle

==== 1st Final League Dream Match ====
- Judge: Cha Jin-yeob, Lee Yoon-kyung, Hong Se-Jung, Kim Yong-soo, Lee Woo-Sung, Kim Hak-soo (G-haksu), Jo Seung-ho

Round	Team	Contestant	Song	Judge Score
1	Red Wings	Son Byung-Hyun, Ahn Hye-sang	Pump It - Black Eyed Peas	89.4
1	Blue Eye	Ahn Nam-geun, Lee Ji-eun	Don't Stop Me Now - Queen	92.4
2	Red Wings	Kim Kyung-il, Lee Yoon-hee	Stronger (What Doesn't Kill You) - Kelly Clarkson	92.6
2	Blue Eye	Yoon Jeon-il, Im Saet-byul	눈물이 뚝뚝 - 케이윌 (Dropping The Tears - K.Will)	93.6
3	Red Wings	Shin Kyu-sang, Lee Yoo-min, Park Jung-eun	Timber (Feat. Kesha) - Pitbull	91.0
3	Blue Eye	Kim Tae-hyun, Park In-soo, Choi Nam-mi	불타는 금요일 - 다이나믹 듀오 (Friday Night - Dynamic Duo)	92.6
4	Red Wings	Yoon Na-ra, Choi Soo-jin	Skinny Love - Birdy	93.6
4	Blue Eye	Kim Seol-jin, Kim Ki-soo	Love Never Felt So Good - Michael Jackson	92.6
5	Red Wings	RED9 (Ha Hui-dong choreography)	Turn Down for What - DJ Snake, Lil Jon	93.6
5	Blue Eye	BLUE9 (Jay Park choreography)	Bang It To The Curb - Far East Movement, 태권도 - 박재범 (TaeKwonDo - Jay Park)	94.8

Final Result

Team	Total Score	Result
Red Wings	460.2	
Blue Eye	469	WINNER

==== Pre-2nd Final Battle ====
Round	Category	Team	Contestant	Song
1	Sexy Cat	Red Wings	Shin Kyu-sang, Lee Yoon-hee	Mama Do (Uh Oh, Uh Oh) - Pixie Lott
1	Sexy Cat	Blue Eye	Ahn Nam-geun, Kim Ki-soo	Mama Do (Uh Oh, Uh Oh) - Pixie Lott
2	Lovely Cat	Red Wings	Lee Yoo-min, Choi Soo-jin	My Same - Adele
2	Lovely Cat	Blue Eye	Im Saet-byul, Park In-soo	My Same - Adele
3	Stray Cat	Red Wings	Son Byung-hyun, Kim Kyung-il, Yoon Na-ra	OMG - Usher
3	Stray Cat	Blue Eye	Yoon Jeon-il, Kim Tae-hyun, Choi Nam-mi	OMG - Usher
4	Sensitive Cat	Red Wings	Ahn Hye-sang, Park Jung-eun	In The Ayer (Feat. will.i.am) - Flo Rida
4	Sensitive Cat	Blue Eye	Kim Seol-jin, Lee Ji-eun	In The Ayer (Feat. will.i.am) - Flo Rida

- Judge: Matthew Jessner, Emma Delmenico, James Cooper
- Result: Red Wings vs Blue Eye (3-0) Red Wings WIN, Red Wings got score 3 for 2nd Final Battle

==== 2nd Final League Master Match ====
- Judge: Kim Ji Young, Cha Jin Yeob, Kim Young Jin, Hong Se Jeong, Lee Woo Seong, Boogaloo Kin, Jo Seung Ho

Round	Team	Master	Contestant	Song	Judge Score
1	Blue Eye	Jay Park	Kim Ki-soo, Kim Tae-hyun	Fine China - Chris Brown	91.6
1	Red Wings	Ha Hui-dong	Shin Kyu-sang, Lee Yoo-mi, Kim Kyung-il	Thunder - The Prodigy	93.0
2	Blue Eye	Park Ji-eun	Yoon Jeon-il, Choi Nam-mi, Lee Ji-eun	Tanguera - Luis Bravo	90.4
2	Red Wings	Park Ji-woo	Yoon Na-ra, Ahn Hye-sang	I Finally Found Someone - Barbra Streisand, Bryan Adams	92.0
3	Blue Eye	Kim Soo-ro	Kim Seol-jin, Park In-soo	혈액형 - YB (Blood Type - YB)	96.4
3	Red Wings	Lee Min-woo	Son Byung-hyun, Park Jung-eun	The Monster (Feat. Rihanna) - Eminem	91.2
4	Blue Eye	Lee Yong-woo	Ahn Nam-geun, Im Saet-byul	Chandelier - Sia	92.4
4	Red Wings	Woo Hyun-young	Lee Yoon-hee, Choi Soo-jin	Folie Czardas - Claude Bolling	95.4
5	Blue Eye	Lee Yong-woo	BLUE9	Radioactive - Imagine Dragons	94.6
5	Red Wings	Woo Hyun-young	RED9	Stand and Become Legendary - Jack Trammell (RoboCop soundtrack)	97.2

Final Result

Team	Total Score	Result
Blue Eye	465.4	
Red Wings	471.8	WINNER

==== Pre-3rd Final Battle ====
Round	Team	Contestant	Song
1	Red Wings	Son Byung-hyun, Lee Yoo-min, Park Jeong-eun	Shawty Got Moves - Get Cool
1	Blue Eye	Ahn Nam-geun, Yoon Jeon-il, Kim Ki-soo	Show Me The Money - Petey Pablo
2	Red Wings	Yoon Na-ra, Shin Kyu-sang, Kim Kyung-il	Demons - Zeds Dead
2	Blue Eye	Im Saet-byul, Park In-soo, Lee Ji-eun	'Til The dawn - Drew Sidora
3	Red Wings	Choi Soo-jin, Ahn Hye-sang, Lee Yoon-hee	Hands In The Air - Timbaland
3	Blue Eye	Choi Nam-mi, Kim Tae-hyun, Kim Seol-jin	[My Homies Still - Lil Wayne

- Judge: Nam Kyung-joo, Jamal Sims, Dondraico Johnson
- Theme: The Original
- Result: Red Wings vs Blue Eye (0-3) Blue Eye WIN, Blue Eye got score 3 for 3rd Final Battle

==== 3rd Final League Mix Match ====
- Judge: Jamal Sims, Kim Ji-young, Cha Jin-yeob, Kim Seong-young, Hong Se-jeong, Lee Woo-Seong, Jo Seung-ho

Round	Team	Contestant	Song	Judge Score
1	Red Wings	Park Jung-eun	Good Luck - Basement Jaxx + Din Daa Daa - George Kranz	93.6
1	Blue Eye	Choi Nam-mi	Good Luck - Basement Jaxx + Din Daa Daa - George Kranz	92.6
2	Red Wings	Son Byung-hyun	Moment In Love - Art Of Noise + Galaxy Bounce - Chemical Brothers	93.4
2	Blue Eye	Kim Ki-soo	Moment In Love - Art Of Noise + Galaxy Bounce - Chemical Brothers	95
3	Red Wings	Lee Yeon-hee	Conquest Of Spaces - Woodkid	93
3	Blue Eye	Im Saet-byul	Conquest Of Spaces - Woodkid	93.6
4	Red Wings	Lee Yoo-mi	E.T. - Katy Perry	94
4	Blue Eye	Kim Tae-hyun	E.T. - Katy Perry	95.2
5	Red Wings	Ahn Hye-sang	Cuba2012 - Latin Formation + Quizas, Quizas, Quizas - Andrea Bocelli, Jennifer Lopez	94.4
5	Blue Eye	Lee Ji-eun	Cuba2012 - Latin Formation + Quizas, Quizas, Quizas - Andrea Bocelli, Jennifer Lopez	92.6
6	Red Wings	Kim Kyung-il	품바 (Pum Ba!) - Aux	94.6
6	Blue Eye	Yoon Jeon-il	품바 (Pum Ba!) - Aux	95
7	Red Wings	Yoon Na-ra	Say Something - A Great Big World feat. Christina Aguilera	94.6
7	Blue Eye	Ahn Nam-geun	Say Something - A Great Big World feat. Christina Aguilera	94.6
8	Red Wings	Shin Kyu-sang	Organ Donor - DJ Shadow	95
8	Blue Eye	Park In-soo	Organ Donor - DJ Shadow	95.4
9	Red Wings	Choi Soo-jin	Lascia Ch'io Pianga - Hendel	96.6
9	Blue Eye	Kim Seol-Jin	Lascia Ch'io Pianga - Hendel	96.8
10	Red Wings	RED9	Surface + Warrior Of The Night - Aero Chord	96.8
10	Blue Eye	BLUE9	Black Skinhead - Kanye West + Rampage - Ry Legit	96.2

Final Result

Team	Total Score	Result
Red Wings	946	
Blue Eye	950	WINNER

=== Season finale ===
On August 16, 2014, with a final score of 1-2, Blue Eye was declared the winner and Blue Eye's Kim Seol-jin was declared the MVP of the second season.
