= Birdie Buddy =

South Korean television series

- Promotional poster
- Genre: Romance; Comedy; Sports
- Written by: Kwon In-chan; Yoo Young-ah; Bae Jong-byung
- Directed by: Yoon Sang-ho
- Starring: Uee; Lee Yong-woo; Lee Da-hee
- Country of origin: South Korea
- Original language: Korean
- No. of episodes: 24

Production
- Producer: Song Byung-joon
- Production locations: Jeongseon County, Gangwon Province, South Korea
- Running time: 45 minutes
- Production companies: Group Eight; Hunus Entertainment

Original release
- Network: tvN
- Release: August 8 – October 25, 2011

Birdie Buddy (Korean: 버디버디) is a South Korean television series set in the world of professional golf. Based on the 2007 comic series of the same title by Lee Hyun-sae, it stars Uee, Lee Yong-woo and Lee Da-hee.

The drama was pre-produced in 2010 (filmed completely before broadcast), and initially expected to air on MBC in December 2010, but the network decided not to give it a timeslot. After several postponements, it aired on cable channel tvN from August 8 to October 25, 2011 on Mondays and Tuesdays at 23:00 (KST). But instead of the original 20 episodes of 70 minutes each, it was re-edited into 24 episodes spanning 45 minutes each.

== Synopsis ==
Sung Mi-soo (Uee) is a cheerful, humble country girl from Gangwon Province. She comes from a poor family, and her mother used to work as a caddie. With her bright personality and determined efforts, Mi-soo strives to become a professional golf player.

On the other hand, Min Hae-ryung (Lee Da-hee) is an elite athlete who has been groomed for professional golf since a young age. Placed in the best environment to play golf, Hae-ryung's emotions are always controlled even though she has a deep emotional wound.

These two girls from different backgrounds share the same dream of being the next top golfer, a dream that leads them to former pro golfer John Lee (Lee Yong-woo).

John Lee was the first Korean to win a PGA title. Other than the fact that he was adopted, his background is a mystery . Aside from golf, he also excels in the Afro-Brazilian dance/martial arts style known as capoeira. Even though he found success by winning the PGA title, John Lee stopped playing golf to become a golf course tester. John Lee agrees to lead Mi-soo and Hae-ryung into becoming the next queens of golf like Se Ri Pak, Michelle Wie, Jiyai Shin, and Eun-Hee Ji.

== Cast ==
=== Main ===
- Uee as Sung Mi-soo
  - Jin Ji-hee as young Mi-soo
- Lee Yong-woo as John Lee
  - Yoon Chan as young John
- Lee Da-hee as Min Hae-ryung

=== Supporting ===
==== Mi-soo's family and friends ====
- Lee Byung-joon as Sung Kyung-hwan
- Yoon Yoo-sun as Jo Kyung-sook (Mi-soo's mother)
- Park Han-bi as Sung Tae-gab (Mi-soo's brother)
  - Ahn Do-gyu as young Tae-gab
- Yoo In-na as Lee Gong-sook (Mi-soo's friend), in love with Tae-gab
  - Gina as young Gong-sook
- Han Seung-hyun as Ahn Joong-ki

==== Hae-ryung's family and friends ====
- Oh Hyun-kyung as Min Se-hwa (Hae-ryung's mother)
- Park Sung-woong as Choi Dong-kwan, Min Se-hwa's right-hand man and lover
- Kim Jong-jin as Woo Joon-mo, a skilled greens keeper who is Hae-ryung's long lost father
- Yang Hee-kyung as Uhm Jung-ran, a friend of both Kyung-sook and Se-hwa, who becomes the chief of caddies at Se-hwa's golf club

==== Others ====
- Choi Il-hwa as Jay Park, a wealthy and manipulative gambler
- Robert Holley as Yoon Kwang-baek, a former golf pro and now an eccentric recluse who takes on Mi-soo as his student
- Park Young-rin as Park Eun-joo, an energetic young reporter
- Yoon Gi-won as pro-golfer Wang
- Julien Kang as Gary Jung, a golfer hired by Jay Park to play Mi-soo in an unusual golf challenge
- Choo So-young, a scout
- Kim Jung-hak, one of Park's henchmen
- Woo Hyun, a golf equipment maker and friend of John Lee
- Kim Dong-hyeon
- Samuel Kang, a reporter
- Gu Bon-im
