= MLMA =

South Korean artist and designer

Me Love Me A Lot
- Born: 1991 or 1992 (age 33–34)
- Occupations: Artist; rapper; fashion designer
- Years active: 2014–present

MLMA (acronym for Me Love Me A Lot) is a pseudonymous South Korean-born artist, rapper, and fashion designer. She is known for surreal, sometimes grotesque imagery in a variety of artistic media.

== Career ==
MLMA began her artistic career after quitting a design job with MIXXMIX in 2014. Her initial plans were to develop an independent line of socks, owing to a belief that most fashionable socks were either of poor quality or poor design. She began to distribute many of her artistic creations via Instagram, often using simple art supplies sourced from dollar stores. In 2017, MLMA went viral on Instagram after starting the "wavy brows" trend, a style imitated by Instagram influencers and a Snapchat filter.

In music, MLMA is known for songs which, "while rooted in hip-hop, borrow heavily from K-pop and electronic music." Her October 2018 single "Sweetie" was reviewed positively by Paper magazine as "brimming over with disaffected nonchalance ... in a laconic, half-rapped tone." In May 2020, MLMA released a new single, "You Can't Kill Me I'm Alive." She has been described as being part of the SoundCloud rap movement.

MLMA is a lead designer at Korean streetwear label Skoot (sometimes stylized SKØØT), of which she is also a co-founder. Her involvement with Skoot began after attracting attention at a solo art show in Toronto, Canada. Many promotional images for the brand were taken from house parties, with the clothes modeled by MLMA's personal friends. Skoot's sometimes eccentric style features original artwork by MLMA along with heavily anime-inspired imagery, making reference to prominent franchises like Neon Genesis Evangelion. Billie Eilish was an early supporter of the brand, wearing Skoot apparel in her music video for the song "Therefore I Am" and also during her performance at the American Music Awards of 2020. Since then, artists and groups who have worn Skoot include Rico Nasty, BTS, Rosalía, Blackpink, Grimes, and Jackson Wang.

MLMA has appeared at haute couture events, often with an absurdist or whimsical style. She walked a show at Paris Fashion Week 2018 holding a replica of her own head. In 2020, MLMA was the public face of the "KFC Crocs" campaign, a promotional collaboration between KFC and Crocs. MLMA appeared in a commercial promoting the shoes and personally modeled a platform version of the KFC Crocs at New York Fashion Week. The shoes were distributed to celebrities like Kim Kardashian before becoming available for sale to the general public.

== Personal life ==
MLMA was raised in a working-class neighborhood of Seoul, South Korea. She spends about half her time in Canada, where she has family.

In August 2020, MLMA posted several photographs of Post Malone to her Instagram account, causing hip-hop news outlets to speculate about the possibility of a romantic attachment between the two.
