= Baek Sang-seung =

South Korean politician (1935–2018)

- Hangul: 백상승
- Hanja: 白相承
- RR: Baek Sangseung
- MR: Paek Sangsŭng

Baek Sang-seung (Korean: 백상승; December 12, 1935 – September 23, 2018) was a South Korean politician who served as the mayor of Gyeongju. He was elected to the post in 2002. He was a member of the Grand National Party. He studied public administration at the undergraduate level at Korea University, and attended graduate school in the same field at Seoul National University. Prior to attaining his present position, he held various positions in the Seoul municipal government.

== See also ==
- Politics of South Korea
