= Jamie Paik =

Canadian roboticist

- Education: University of British Columbia; Seoul National University
- Scientific career
- Workplaces: Pierre and Marie Curie University Harvard University École Polytechnique Fédérale de Lausanne

Jamie Kyujin Paik is a Canadian engineer who is a professor and director of the Reconfigurable Robotics Lab at École Polytechnique Fédérale de Lausanne.

== Early life and education ==
Paik was born in Canada. Her father is a scientist and her mother is a painter. She completed her bachelor's degree at University of British Columbia. She majored in mechanical engineering. She earned her PhD at Seoul National University, sponsored by Samsung Electronics. Her PhD considered the limbs of anthropomorphic robots.

== Research ==
Paik worked as a postdoctoral researcher in Pierre and Marie Curie University, where she worked on laparoscopic tools. JAIMY, a 5 mm size motorised robot, can be used to assist suturing during surgery. It is available commercially through Endocontrol Medical. She joined Harvard University as a postdoctoral researcher, working with Erik Demaine, Daniela L. Rus and Robert Wood.

In 2012, Paik founded the Reconfigurable Robotics Lab at École Polytechnique Fédérale de Lausanne. She is a member of the Swiss National Center of Competence in Research. Her recent work focuses on robotic origami, robogami. She developed vacuum-powered Soft Pneumatic Actuators for compliant robotics. She was an invited speaker at the Obama Administration's Women Inspire Innovation workshop in 2013. She was a judge at the 2016 and 2018 Soft Robotics Toolkit competition. She was a participant at the 2018 Science Foo Camp. She was a 2019 TED Conferences speaker.
