= KDI School of Public Policy and Management =

Public policy school in Sejong, South Korea

KDI School of Public Policy and Management (KDIS)
- KDI 국제정책대학원대학교
- Type: Government-run
- Established: 1997
- Parent institution: Korea Development Institute
- Affiliations: Korea Development Institute(KDI)
- President: Se Jik Kim
- Dean: Kim, Joon-Kyung
- Postgraduates: 1100+
- Location: 263 Namsejong-ro, Sejong Special Self-Governing City, South Korea
- Campus: Sejong City (current); Seoul (former)
- Language: English
- Colors: Green & Platinum
- Website: www.kdischool.ac.kr

- KDI School of Public Policy and Management
- Hangul: KDI 국제정책대학원대학교
- Hanja: KDI 國際政策大學院大學校
- RR: KDI gukje jeongchaek daehagwon daehakgyo
- MR: KDI kukche chŏngch'aek taehagwŏn taehakkyo

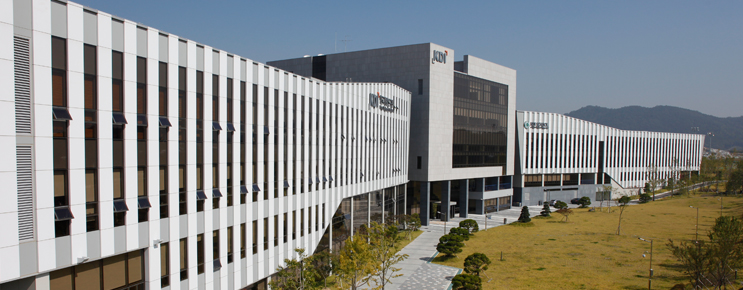
The Korea Development Institute (front) and the KDI School of Public Policy and Management (rear).

The KDI School of Public Policy and Management (KDI School, Korean: KDI 국제정책대학원대학교) is a government-run graduate school located in Sejong City, South Korea and is affiliated to the Korea Development Institute (KDI) and a member of the National Research Council for Economics, Humanities, and Social Sciences. The school was first established in 1997 in Dongdaemun District, Seoul, before moving to Sejong City in 2015 under the South Korean government's actions to establish the city as the de facto administrative capital of the country. The school specializes in fostering international experts in the field of development economics and public policy.

Highly selective, the school takes on a small number of Korean and international students for its Master and Ph.D. programs taught in an institute-style research environment.

== History ==
The KDI School was established in 1997 by the Ministry of Education and Human Resources Development and the Korea Development Institute (KDI). KDI was an economic policy think tank set up by the South Korean government in 1971 the Korea Development Institute established the KDI School of Public Policy and Management.

The KDI School of Public Policy and Management has partnerships with major institutions and agencies related to South Korea's economic and international activities. In 1999, the school was appointed by the Korea International Cooperation Agency (KOICA) as a partner. In 2001, the KDI School became the Korean hub for the World Bank's Global Development Learning Network.

In 2015, the KDI School was relocated from Hoegi-dong, Dongdaemun District, to Sejong City. This move was, in part, due to the earlier creation of Sejong City from parts of both South Chungcheong Province and North Chungcheong Province by the Korean government. The Korean government established Sejong City as a de facto administrative capital for South Korea and since construction, over 36 government agencies have relocated from Seoul and other cities to it. As the Korea Development Institute's main mission is to conduct economic research and produce reports for government agencies and private businesses, the move of the KDI School was in coordination with the greater movement of government agencies that the Korea Development Institute works closely with.

Since its establishment, KDI School of Public Policy and Management has developed an innovative educational program focusing on policy and international issues in order to transform mid-career professionals into leaders of their respective fields by equipping them with new knowledge, vision and a global perspective. The curriculum is largely policy-focused and draws upon the wealth of research and resources from the Korea Development Institute. From the institute's history in documenting South Korea's economic growth, the affiliation between the institute and the graduate school has contributed in disseminating Korea's unique economic and social development experiences with the global community. The KDI School has been recognized throughout Korea and the world as a premier institution for research and learning in the field of development studies, development economics, and public policy. The KDI School is counted as 6th Top think tank in Asia, 22nd in the world and 8th best affiliated think tank in the world.

The postgraduate programs have undergone significant change since the school's establishment. While currently offering a Master of Development Policy (MDP), Master of Public Management (MPM), Master of Public Policy (MPP), and a Ph.D. program, in the past, the KDI School has offered a Master of Business Administration (MBA), Master of Business (MB), Master of Foreign Direct Investment (MFDI), Master in Asset Management (MAM) and an International Master's Program in Practicing Management (IMPM).

== Academic programs ==
The KDI School of Public Policy and Management offers master's degree programs and a Ph.D. program. The school's curricula draw from accumulated resources of KDI and strive to meet the diverse and professional demands of the global economy.

- Master of Public Policy(MPP)
- Master of Development Policy(MDP)
- Master of Public Management (MPM)
- Master of Data Science for Public Policy and Management (MDS)
- Master in Intellectual Property and Development Policy (MIPD)
- Ph.D. Program
- Non-Degree Certificate Programs

The Master's programs are divided into full-time and part-time courses. Full-time students are able to complete their coursework by the end of the first year and usually spend the second year working on their research component (thesis, capstone project, or supervised research project). Full-time students are able to graduate in 18 months. Part-time programs operate in a flexible combination of evening and weekend classes. Part-time students may graduate within two years while maintaining their current careers. Both full-time and part-time courses are available for the MDP and MPP programs. All classes are conducted in English.

The Master's programs in the KDI School are divided into five programs:

- Master of Development Policy Program (MDP)

Based on KDI's hands-on experience in development policy, the Master of Development Policy (MDP) program examines various socio-economic issues in both theoretical and practical frameworks. The program provides capacity building for international professionals, including government officials, development consultants and regional specialists who wish to contribute to development policy-making. Additional focus falls on fostering professionals in the field of official development assistance (ODA). The goal of the program is to build capacity in designing and implementing economic and social policies in developing countries. It also seeks to train professionals in the field of sustainable development and international development cooperation through the practical combination of development theories and the development policies of South Korea. Students may declare a concentration among seven choices but must take development-focused core courses. In 2017, the MDP program was accredited by the Network of Schools of Public Policy, Affairs, and Administration (NASPAA).

- Master of Public Policy Program (MPP)
- Master of Public Management (MPM)
- Master of Data Science for Public Policy and Management (MDS)
- Master in Intellectual Property and Development Policy (MIPD)
- Concentrations

For each Master's program, a student must elect one concentration within the focus of their respective program. The current concentrations with their programs denoted in parentheses are:

- Finance and Macroeconomic Policy (MPP)
- Trade and Industrial Policy (MPP)
- Public Finance and Social Policy (MPP)
- Regional Development and Environment Policy (MPP)
- Sustainable Development (MDP)
- International Development (MDP)
- Public Administration and Leadership (MPM)
- Strategic Management (MPM)
- Global Governance and Political Economy (MPM)

Students may declare a second concentration at the end of their studies if they have taken the required amount of credits from the elected second concentration. The second concentration may be from any of the concentrations provided by the school's courses.

- Ph.D. Program

The KDI School offers a Ph.D. in public policy with two specializations to choose from: Economic policy and development policy. A one-year residency is required for all students, during which students must take at least 9 classes (27 credits). Afterwards, students are required to pass a comprehensive examination covering their field of study. Pending successfully passing the exam, students must take 9 more credits (36 credits in total), upon which they are required to pass an oral examination in their field of study, followed by the submission of a thesis. Starting from their second year, students have the option of pursuing work and study simultaneously. Ph.D. students at KDI School are encouraged to collaborate with the school's faculty on research projects in order to foster a strong environment where students work closely with professors.

The Ph.D. program contains required courses for the program and also field requirements. Common requirements for the program are two econometrics courses, one microeconomics course, and a course on public policy. Field requirements dictate that students take one microeconomics course and an advanced macroeconomic policy course for the public policy field. For the development policy field, students are required to take two development economics courses.

== Study Abroad Programs ==
- Global Master's Program

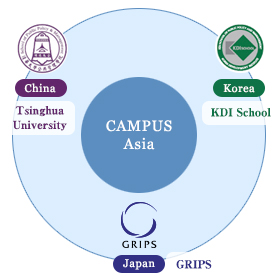
The CAMPUS Asia program with partners Tsinghua University in Beijing and National Graduate Institute for Policy Studies in Tokyo.

The Global Master's Program (GMP) is a special program for Korean central/local government officials and private sector mid-level managers. GMP Scholars spend one academic year at the KDI School and one year abroad at a partner institution, enabling them to acquire two degrees during their period of study.

- Exchange Program

All master's degree students can participate in any of the existing exchange programs after completing three terms of studies. Credits earned from the exchange program may be transferred to the KDI School after consultation with the Office of Academic and Student Affairs. Students participating in the exchange program will pay tuition only to the KDI School, not to the host institution.

- CAMPUS Asia

Commencing from 2012, students may take classes and earn credits or a degree in China and Japan, sponsored by a newly introduced, inter-governmental scholarship called CAMPUS Asia. Designed to promote cooperation among Asian universities, CAMPUS Asia allows students to obtain an additional master's degree while living and studying in either of the three Northeast Asian countries.

== Admissions ==
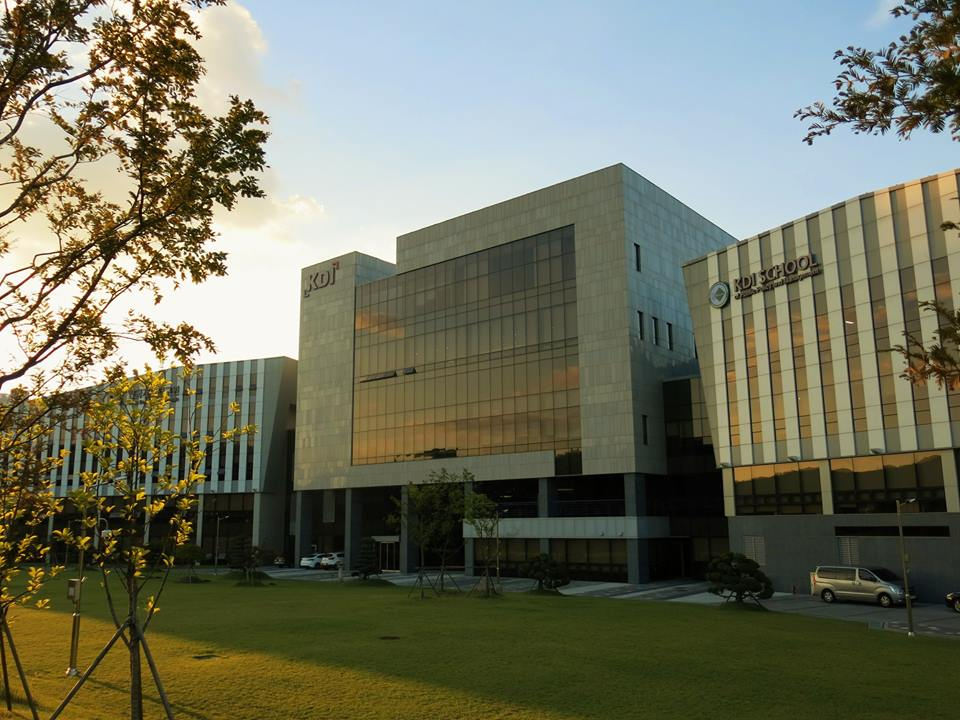
The KDI School of Public Policy and Management (right), the Central Building (centre) and the Korea Development Institute (left).

KDI School of Public Policy and Management has two admissions periods in February for the Spring semester and in September for the Fall semester. Ph.D. applicants are only admitted in the Spring semester.

== Student body ==
The KDI School of Public Policy and Management, since establishment in 1997, has grown to have an international alumni network of over 1600 students from one-hundred and seven different countries. The school is one of the few postgraduate institutions in South Korea where the medium of instruction is entirely in English. The student body is drawn from a large pool of government officials, business managers and exceptional students from both domestically and abroad. A majority of students admitted are mid-career professionals with 5–10 years of working experience in government, business, NGOs, media or academia. International students account for around 50% of the student body, further promoting the internationalism of the school and the creation of a powerful alumni network.

== Capacity Building Center ==
KDI School's Capacity Building Center (CBC) offers various training programs to government officials from around the world ranging from working-level officials to high-level decision makers.

- Global Leadership Program

The objective of the program is to enable participants to enhance their contributions towards reaching G20 development goals set forth at the 2010 G20 Seoul summit in 2010. The program has been designed to drive the momentum in implementing action plans at each subsequent G20 Summit. Mid to high level government officials from G20 and non-G20 countries are eligible for the programme and are provided specialized courses on G20 development agenda issues.

- SICA Cooperation Program

The SICA (Central American Integration System, Spanish: Sistema de la Integración Centroamericana) aims to support the establishment of a regional school and its affiliated institute that conducts education and research on socio-economic development plans for SICA member countries. The CBC at KDI School carries out local training programs by building the capacity of policy-makers and sending an advisory group to conduct local consultations in member countries.

- Global Development Learning Network (GDLN)

The Global Development Learning Network (GDLN), a World Bank initiative, is a partnership of over 120 affiliates in approximately 80 countries providing learning in the field of development using an educational platform featuring web-based outlets and video conferencing facilities. The GDLN Korea Center offers Blended Learning Programs consisting of videoconference sessions and face-to-face training on Korea's developmental experience. As the GDLN Global Secretariat, KDI School facilitates as the GDLN network worldwide.

- International Knowledge Cooperation Programs

The CBC uses multiple programs to train and build the capacity among professionals primarily in the public sector overseas. These programs include the following: Mid-Career Training Program for the Indian Administrative Service (IAS) Officers: Korea Study Tour; Capacity Building Program for One Belt, One Road Initiative (China); Saudi Arabia Technical and Vocational Training Corporation (TVTC) Officials Training Program; Economic Development Strategy for Commonwealth of Independent States (CIS) Countries - Public Policy and Management; Enhancing the Capacity of Officials and Employees of the Office of Government and Central Agencies (Vietnam); and the Thailand High Performance and Potential System (HiPPS) Capability Development Program.

== Research and Learning Resource Center ==
The Research and Learning Resource Center (RLRC) was launched to promote KDI School as a global leader in sharing Korea's knowledge in development. The center collects and selects information related to Korea's development experience and shares it through K-Developedia. The RLRC also aims to further disseminate knowledge through various channels including the school's e-Learning platform. The center operates to promote knowledge partnerships between Korea and its partner countries in the developing world.

- K-Developedia

K-Developedia is a comprehensive repository of Korea's development experience, launched by KDI School of Public Policy and Management in 2012. It includes documentation of the last 70 years of Korea's development experiences on various socio-economic issues and outcomes of ODA activities carried out since 1982 with developing countries. The database contains more than 35,000 full-texts and multimedia content (i.e. photos and videos), and provides free links to documents on Korea's development. It aims to provide open access to resources on Korea's development experience in an effort to be recognized as a complete research and knowledge repository. K-Developedia targets decision makers in developing countries and researchers in the development field based on the motto of ‘sharing knowledge for shared growth’. The website has six categories - Development Overview, Themes, Resources, KSP, Statistics, Events.

- E-Learning Content and Platform

The e-Learning content covers numerous subjects including Korea's development and other development and policy issues and is maximized by the advantages of an online learning platform. Various lectures and programs held at the school are made into e-Learning content and are delivered to its intended audience through the school's online learning management system, eKDIS, while also available globally through iTunes U, a free online courses platform offered by Apple.

== Timeline ==
Below is a timeline of the KDI School of Public Policy and Management's significant achievements:

- 1997.12: Founded with an authorization from the Ministry of Education and Human Resources Development
- 1998.03: Classes commence (four programs)
  - 1998.07: Dr. Lim, Gill-Chin inaugurated as the first dean
- 1999.01: Appointed by Korea International Cooperation Agency(KOICA) as a partner institution
  - 1999.11: Official name changed from the KDI School of International Policy and Management to the current name
  - 1999.12: Designated as an Asia-Pacific Economic Cooperation(APEC) Education Hub (APEC Chile Conference)
- 2000.02: Global Master's Program(GMP) launched, enabling students to gain dual degrees at the KDI School and abroad
  - 2000.09: Special Program on Economic Policy-Making launched
  - 2000.10: The Center for National Leadership renamed into the Center for Executive Education
- 2001.01: Designated as the Korean Hub of the World Bank’s Global Development Learning Network (GDLN)
  - 2001.02: Ph.D. Program launched
- 2002.01: Master's Programs consolidated into the Master of Public Policy(MPP) and Master of Business Administration(MBA) programs
  - 2002.10: KDI School Alumni Association established
- 2003.01: E-Learning program launched
  - 2003.12: International Master's Program in Practicing Management (IMPM) established
- 2004.03: Designated by the Ministry of Commerce, Industry and Energy to offer a Master’s program in Foreign Direct Investment(MFDI)
  - 2004.05: Master's in Foreign Direct Investment established
- 2005.05: Digital Library opened
- 2006.02: Master's in Asset Management(MAM) launched
- 2007.01: The Organisation for Economic Co-operation and Development(OECD) Seoul Center opened
- 2010.01: MPP program expanded to MPP, MPP/ED, and MPP/PM
- 2012.01: Master's program restructured into MPP and MDP
  - Ph.D. in Development Policy introduced
  - Seoul G20 Global Leaders Program launched
  - Development Research and Learning Network established
- 2013.05: Received “Outstanding Institution Award” and “Outstanding Leadership Award” from National Research Council for Economics, Humanities and Social Sciences
  - 2013.08: Designated as participant in the Korea EU Industrialized Countries Instrument Education Cooperation Programme

== Gallery ==
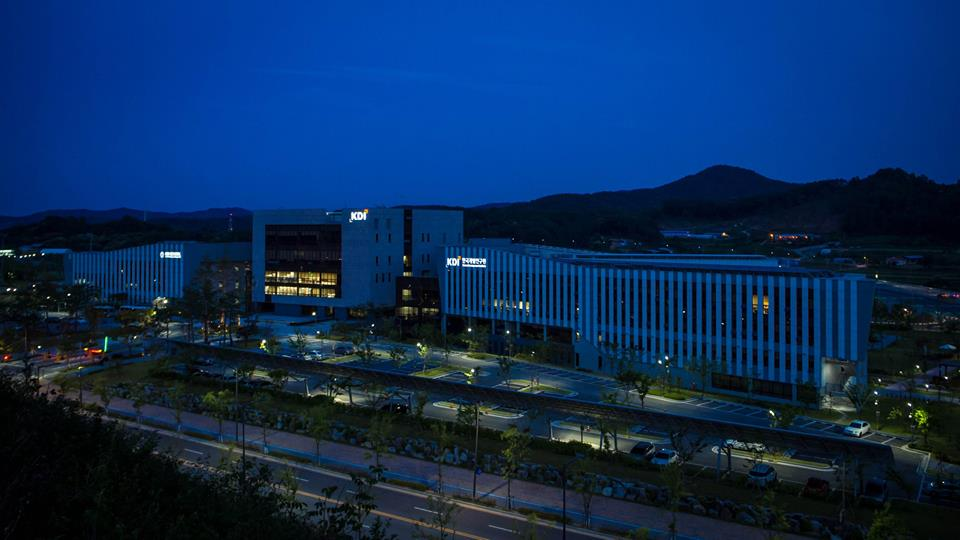
The Korea Development Institute and the KDI School of Public Policy and Management at night.

The student dormitory and faculty apartments directly opposite to the institute.

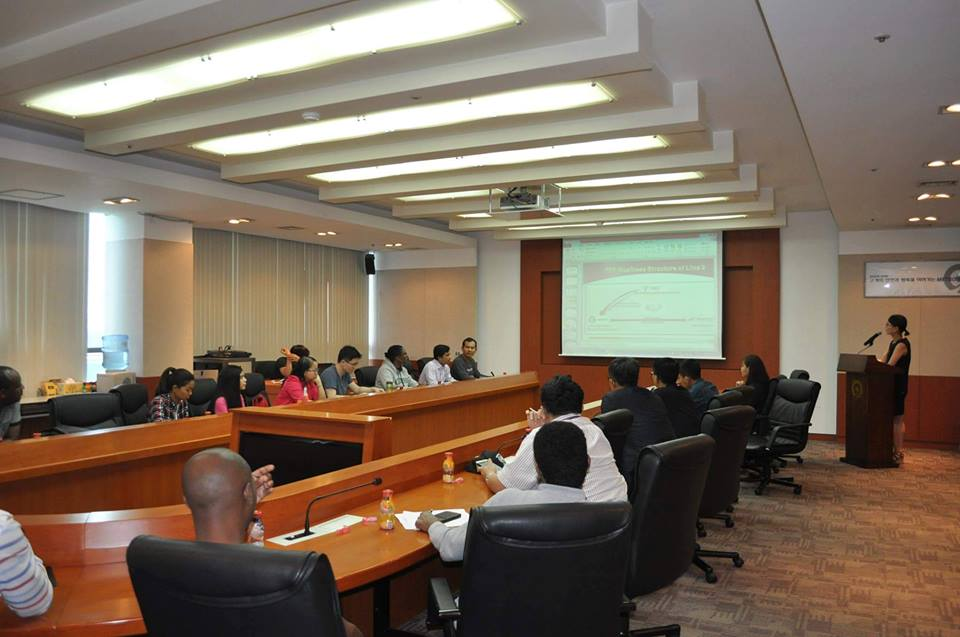
Inside the Ambassador's Hall of the school.

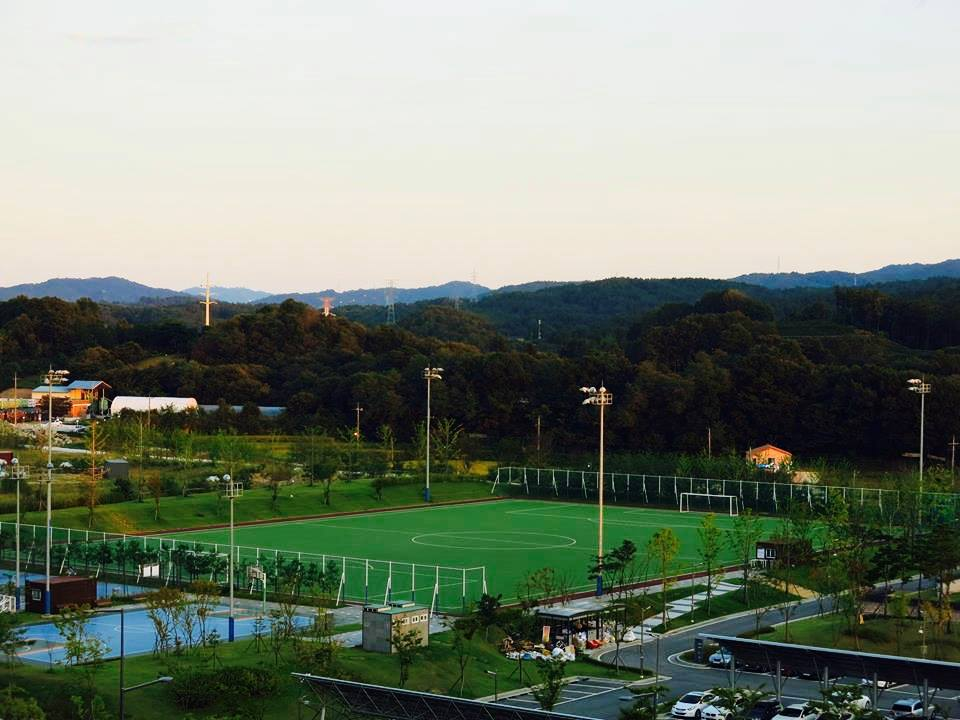
The sports grounds of the institute.

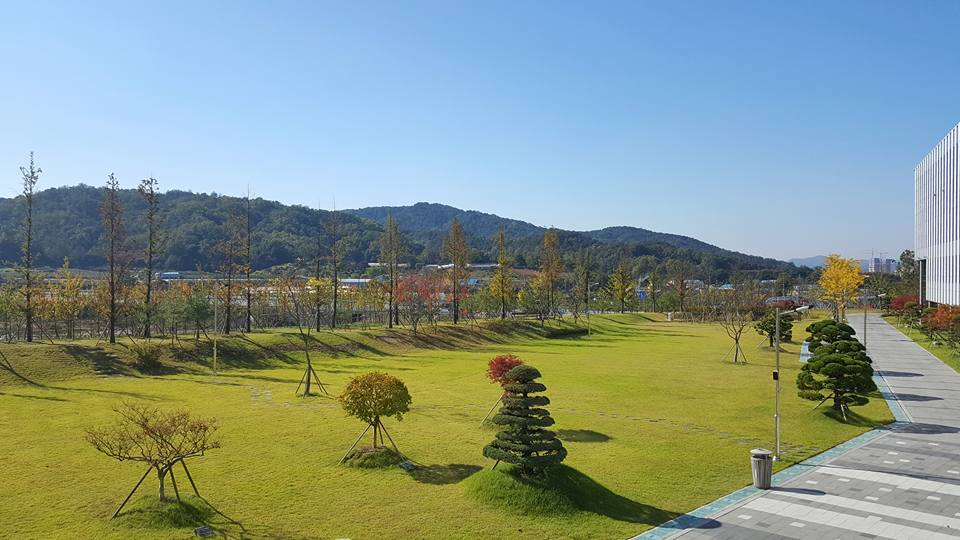
Landscaped surroundings seen from the Central Library.

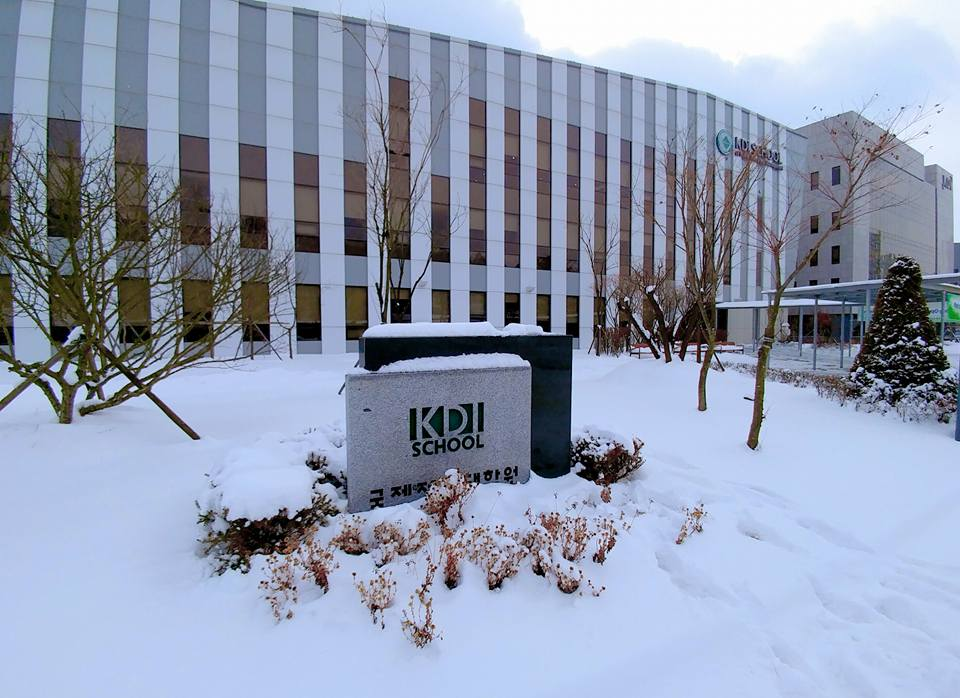
The KDI School in winter.

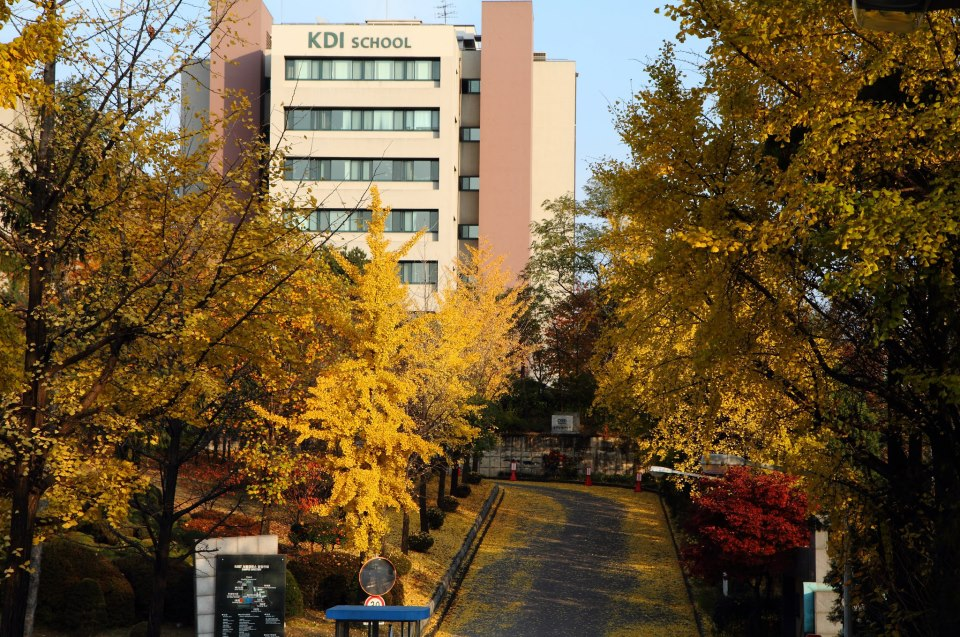
The former KDI School building in Seoul.
