= Paik Gahuim =

South Korean writer

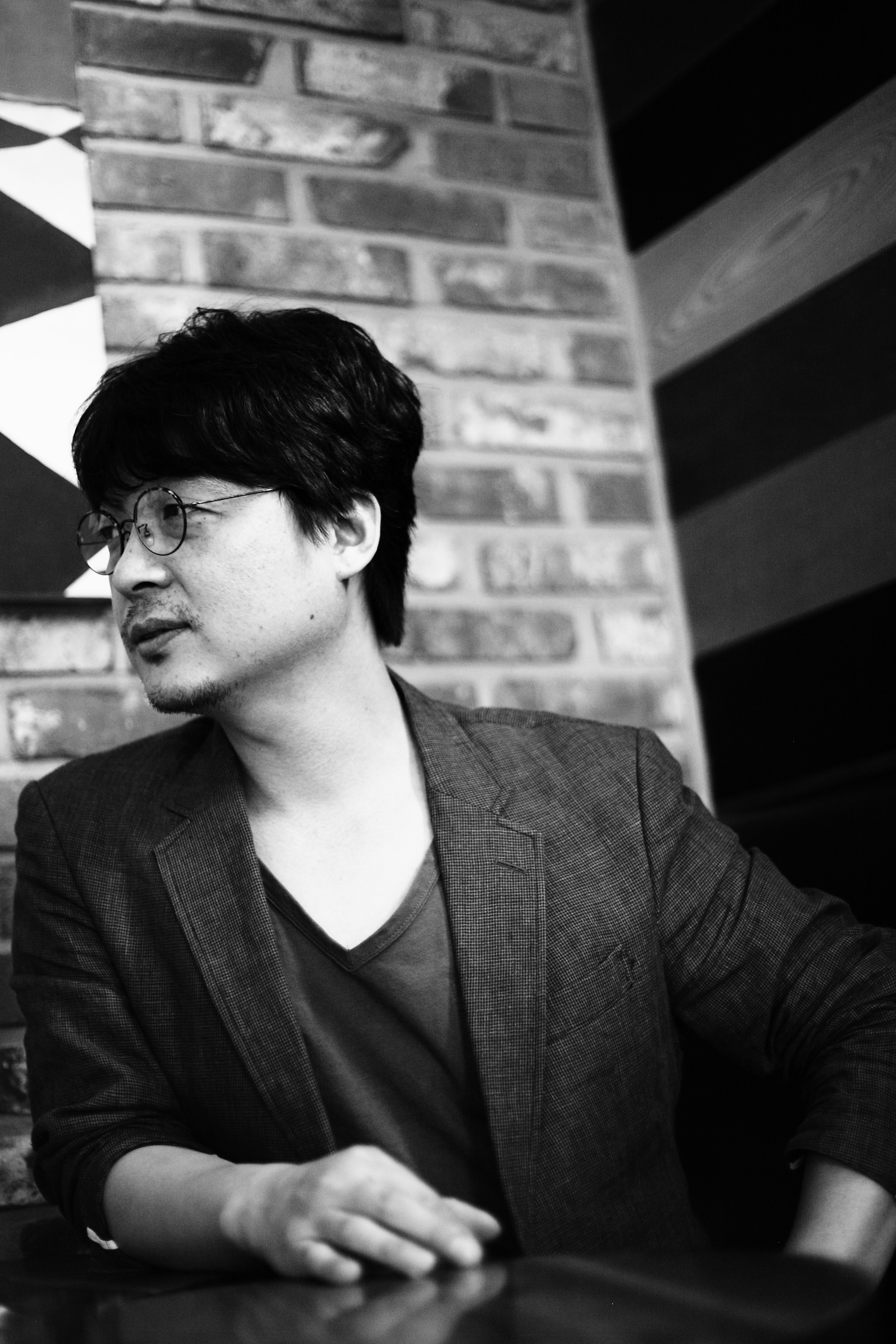
- Paik Gahuim, 2014
- Born: July 26, 1974 (age 52)
- Writing career
- Language: Korean

Korean name
- Hangul: 백가흠
- RR: Baek Gaheum
- MR: Paek Kahŭm

Paik Gahuim (백가흠; born July 26, 1974) is a modern South Korean writer known for his disturbing stories.

== Life ==
Paik Gahuim was born July 26, 1974, in Iksan, Jeollanam-do, South Korea. Baek Ga-heum debuted in 2001 when his short story “Flounder” was the winning entry in the Seoul Shinmun’s spring literary contest.

== Work ==
Paik's work often makes readers feel uncomfortable, as in the case of his debut story which begins with a detailed description of filleting a flounder and then progresses to a portrayal of the narrator having intercourse with a girl from a hostess bar while imagining the inside of his mother’s womb. “When the Pear Blossoms Fade” describes the shocking abuse of children and the handicapped. In “Welcome, Baby” a young child watches a middle-aged couple have intercourse from inside a motel room closet, an infant without eyes or ears is abandoned, and a man tries to hang himself from a fan. In “Here Comes Cricket,” an aged mother who is beaten by her own son plans to end both their lives through joint suicide and “Dress Shoes” features a father who kills his entire family and then takes his own life. Although these ruthless stories fill readers with much discomfort, they are not too far-fetched, for the newspapers, television, and the Internet are full of stories like these. Baek Ga-heum's “The Tomb of a Ship” describes blood-curdling crime in a small port town. The return of a photo criminal past the statute of limitations to his hometown results in vengeful violence and murder, a subversion of dichotomy between good and evil.

Paik's characters tend to the neglected and marginalized—those who are both socially and economically on the bottom rung of society: prostitutes, itinerant manual laborers, sailors running from the law, the mentally and physically handicapped, the elderly homeless living in condemned buildings, and women who are physically and sexually abused. A great number of these characters suffer from speech disorders or lack the mental capacity to recognize the gravity of the situation; the few who do realize their dire circumstances are without the proper education to articulate themselves.

== Works in Korean (partial) ==
- Flounder (2001)
- When the Pear Blossoms Fade
- Welcome, Baby
- Here Comes Cricket
- The Tomb of a Ship
