= Structural transformation =

Structural transformation (also referred to as sectoral transformation and structural change) is the economic process by which a country's economy changes its sectoral composition, typically shifting from agriculture to manufacturing and thenceforth to services. In particular, it is often considered a key component of economic development and is studied by development economists.

== Historical accounts ==
Accounts of structural transformation typically begin with the Industrial Revolution in Britain, when it became the first major country to develop a large-scale manufacturing sector. For instance, roughly 35% of the British population was employed in agriculture as of 1800, falling to around 20% in the middle of the nineteenth century and then 10% around 1900. By contrast, well over half of the population of Brazil, India, and South Korea were employed in agriculture during that time period.

Later in the nineteenth century, a similar pattern took place in countries that the Industrial Revolution had spread to, such as Europe, the United States, Canada, and Australia.

After World War II, other countries, particularly the Four Asian Tigers, also underwent a process of industrialization, catching up significantly to the countries in the developed world. However, other countries in the developing world experienced different trajectories; Brazil began industrializing around the same time, but then faced a slowdown in growth and has to this point failed to achieve convergence with the developed world; Douglas Gollin and Joseph Kaboski argue that Latin America more generally has undergone structural transformation without experiencing the expected amount of economic growth. Countries that began industrialization late typically reached a lower peak level of employment in manufacturing, which Dani Rodrik refers to as premature deindustrialization.

Tianyu Fan, Michael Peters, and Fabrizio Zilibotti have argued that current developing countries are bypassing manufacturing and transitioning from agriculture to services (whether tradable or non-tradable) directly, in a new form of structural transformation. Around 1980, roughly 2/3 of the Indian economy was employed in agriculture, while nowadays that share is below half. That paper finds that, in the context of India, the structural transformation from agriculture to services directly has generated economic growth, but principally concentrated among richer and more urbanized households. They additionally identify as a mechanism driving this change productivity growth in consumer services. Countries employing such a strategy are said to be engaged in services-led development.

== Theory ==
The idea of structural transformation was popularized by Simon Kuznets, who listed it as a major feature of economic growth in the modern era; consequently, a set of major aspects of sectoral transformation are often referred to as the Kuznets facts.

Earlier models of economic growth, like the Solow–Swan model, typically assumed a single sector, where growth was generated by increasing total factor productivity. W. Arthur Lewis developed a precursor to the theory of structural transformation in his dual-sector model, in which developing countries grow through transitioning labor from an agricultural sector to an industrial sector.

To merge structural transformation with balanced-growth models based on Kaldor's facts, Kongsamut, Rebelo, and Xie proposed a generalized balanced growth path, which captures a dynamic where the share in agriculture declines and in services increases, while manufacturing is stable, representing a later phase of structural transformation.

The Structural Transformation and Economic Growth program of the Centre for Economic Policy Research funds research into structural transformation. Its research director is Douglas Gollin of Tufts University.

=== Mechanisms ===
Major mechanisms for structural transformation in a closed economy include changing expenditure patterns as a result of rising incomes, as well as the Baumol effect, also referred to as Baumol's cost disease. It is highly possible for both of these mechanisms to be in operation, driving structural transformation.

==== Income effects ====
Suppose that an economy starts out with the majority of the population working in agriculture, as was typical in much of the world before the Industrial Revolution. If incomes rise, people will generally not spend much of the extra money that they have gained on more food. This leads to a declining share of expenditures going to food, and more going to manufactured goods and services instead. This change in demand then causes the process of structural transformation. This has been compared to a variation on Engel's law.

==== Baumol's cost disease ====
William Baumol proposed a division of the economy into two sectors, a progressive or rising sector and a stagnant or stable sector. The progressive sector makes more use of new technology, while labor is the principal input for the stagnant sector. For instance, classical music is Baumol's original example of the stagnant sector, because there have been no major gains in the amount of music that one live musician can output. In sectors like that, input costs increase, but the output per unit labor does not, leading to rising wages because people would otherwise leave that sector, but also an increasing cost for the products of that sector. Labor thus moves into the stagnant sector.

L. Rachel Ngai and Christopher A. Pissarides developed a model in which Baumol's cost disease is used to explain structural transformation. In this model, employment flows from sectors that are experiencing high productivity growth to ones that are experiencing comparatively low productivity growth. This relies on there being the fastest productivity growth in agriculture at the beginning of structural transformation, and then manufacturing having faster productivity growth, leading employment to concentrate in services. Many services, like the example of classical music, are strongly limited in how much their output per unit labor can grow.

== Other aspects ==
Besides the sectoral aspects of structural transformation, the term is often used to include other large transitions that tend to occur at around the same time in a country's history, such as increasing urbanization. Another change that often goes along with structural transformation is a shift from the informal economy to the formal economy, although there are frequently gray areas between the two, as well as a shift away from home production of goods.

== See also ==
- The Structural Transformation of the Public Sphere
- Economic development
- Tertiarization
- Three-sector model
- Dual-sector model
- Maddison Project
