= Insook Baik =

American gas station owner (born 1950/1951)

- Born: 1950 or 1951 (age 74–75); South Korea
- Occupation: Gas station owner
- Known for: Charity work

Korean name
- Hangul: 백인숙
- RR: Baek Insuk
- MR: Paek Insuk

Insook Baik (Korean: 백인숙; born 1950/1951) is a South Korean-born American gas station owner from Anchorage, Alaska. She is known for giving out free meals on Thanksgiving to residents of Mountain View. In 2022, the Insook Baik Bridge was named after her.

== Life ==
Insook Baik was born in 1950 or 1951 in South Korea. She is from Busan. She grew up in the aftermath of the Korean War and often did not have enough to eat.

She immigrated to the United States in 1980, first settling in New York before moving to Anchorage, Alaska, in 1981. Sometime after, she became the owner two Shell gas stations: one in the neighborhood of Mountain View, and one in Midtown. Inspired by her childhood memories of hunger and the number of immigrants in Mountain View with similar stories to hers, Baik began giving out free Thanksgiving meals from her Mountain View station in the late 2000s. She is assisted by her son and volunteers. In 2016, she prepared and gave out approximately 600 meals. By 2021, that number had grown to around 900. In 2022, Baik was recognized at that years Korean-Anchorage Friendship day and had commemorative photos taken by the South Korean consulate in Anchorage.

== Insook Baik Bridge ==
Insook Baik Bridge
- Coordinates: 61.22122756538054°N 149.80816656699054°W ,

Location
- Interactive map of Insook Baik Bridge

In 2007, to replace a pedestrian bridge spanning the Glenn Highway, the State of Alaska began work on a road bridge that would allow Bragaw Street to cross over the highway. The plans included covered steps and a tunnel for pedestrians, and a set of bike paths. Work finished in 2008. In 2022, Alaska House of Representatives member Geran Tarr, introduced a bill, House Bill 359, to name the bridge after Baik. It passed as part of Senate Bill 203 in August 2022, and the city set aside $7,000 to erect a sign and hold a naming ceremony.

Initially, Baik resisted the bridge's name, but consented after her son persuaded her that it would "raise the status of Koreans". The bridge is the first American bridge named after a Korean person.
