= Baek Young-ok =

South Korean writer

Baek Young-ok (born 1974) is a South Korean writer. Her book Style was adapted into a TV drama of the same name.

== Life ==
Baek Young-ok was born in Seoul in 1974. She won the Munhakdongne New Writer Award in 2006 with her short story "Goyang-I shanti" (고양이 샨티 Shanti the Cat). She won the 4th Segye Literature Award in 2008 with her first novel, Sta-il (스타일 Style). Sta-il (스타일 Style) was made into a TV drama, and was translated into 4 languages and published in China, Japan, Thailand, and Vietnam. Baek Young-ok has written various columns such as ‘That Work, That City’ on Korea's daily newspaper Chosun Ilbo, ‘Beak Young-ok Meets With Unusual Men’ on Kyunghyang Daily News, ‘Night Movies’ on Joongang Sunday S Magazine, and ‘Baek Young-ok's Passport’ on Maeil Kyungjae. She has also made guest appearances on ‘The Secret Book Club’ on the cable channel TVN, and ‘This Blue Night, Presented by Jong-hyun’ on MBC's FM4U radio.

== Writing ==
Baek Young-ok's fiction often deals with the desires of women. However, the focus of her writing is not on which desires women have. Rather, Baek Young-ok's stories put more emphasis on how the desire for becoming more beautiful, or the desire to gain more attention from people are used by society to take advantage of women's bodies. Women's desires and the colonisation of women's bodies is clearly shown in works that specifically deal with the world of celebrities. Her major work Sta-il (스타일 Style) presents actual existing actors, and she draws readers in by exposing or suggesting the illusion of actors. In the novel, the actors are emotional people who are very competitive about their looks and are highly neurotic. The other characters of the novel, the editor in chief of the magazine and the senior reporters, are fierce individuals who work with their mind and body, and pour out ‘orgasms of exclusives’. However, the unique ‘star quality’ only manifests from ‘style’, their physical capital. This comes from their perfect beauty that has been improved by plastic surgery, their gender transcendence through which they can pull off ‘Hedi Slimane’ clothing, and their ‘barren’ bodies that achieve the ‘destruction of boundaries’. The talent or the private concerns of the actors are secondary. In order to win the competition against other media, the stars must richly decorate themselves as well as their inner side, with the most fabulous and unique concept. The paradox that somehow the narcissism of actors addicted to ‘image’, and the interview decorated by collusive ‘illusion’, must lead to a place of actual emotion, is the reality of celebrities shown by Sta-il (스타일 Style).

== Works ==
- Ppalgangmeori ani haneun mal (빨강머리 앤이 하는 말 What Anne of Green Gables Said), 2016.
- Ae-inui Ae-inege (애인의 애인에게 To the Lover of my Lover), 2016.
- Silyeondanghan saramdeului ilgob si jochanmoim (실연당한 사람들의 일곱 시 조찬모임 The 7’O Clock Luncheon for Heartbroken People), 2012.
- Aju botongui yeonae (아주 보통의 연애 Very Normal Dating), 2011.
- Daieoteu-ui yeowang (다이어트의 여왕 The Diet Queen), 2009.
- Sta-il (스타일 Style).

=== Works in Translation ===
- 大酱女 Style (Chinese)
- Style Kinh tụng thời trang (Vietnamese)

== Awards ==
- Segye Ilbo Segye Literature Award, 2008.
