= Suwon Baek clan =

Korean clan in Suwon, Gyeonggi Province

- Country: Korea
- Current region: Suwon
- Founder: Paek Ugyŏng
- Connected members: Baek Jong-won; Baek Jin-hee; Baek Ji-heon; Baek A-yeon; Yerin Baek; Baek Ji-young; Baek Sung-hyun

The Suwon Baek clan (Korean: 수원 백씨; Hanja: 水原 白氏) is a Korean clan. It is from Suwon, Gyeonggi Province. According to research conducted in 2015, the number of members of the clan was 354,428. Their founder was Paek Ugyŏng, who came to Korea in 780 during the Silla period and took a government post. Paek was originally from Suzhou in the Tang dynasty. According to the Tonggyŏng t'ongji (동경통지; 東京通誌), after having left China due to false accusations stemming from the An Lushan rebellion, he built the Chŏnghyesa temple, constructing a thirteen-story stone pagoda at the site.

== See also ==
- Korean clan names of foreign origin
