= Baek Minseok =

South Korean writer

- Born: 1971 (age 54–55)
- Writing career
- Language: Korean

- Korean name
- Hangul: 백민석
- RR: Baek Minseok
- MR: Paek Minsŏk

Baek Minseok (Korean: 백민석) is a modern South Korean writer.

== Life ==
Baek Minseok was born in 1971, in Seoul. In 2004, Baek suspended all writing activities.

== Work ==
Baek Minseok wrote his first work of fiction in 1995 with "I Loved Candy" (내가 사랑한 캔디). Characterized by gory and graphic images, Baek's work often makes direct reference to the bizarre - such as in the case of his representative novel Cotton Field Bizarre Story - and his work has been classified as bizarre fiction.

Boys are often the main characters in Baek's work, such as in the stories "The Errand Boy at the Manor" and "Poor Boy Hans". Even the psychologies of his adult characters are closer to that of children. For example, the main character of "Farm for Dead Owls" is a 30-year-old man-child who only talks to dolls. In these works, characters seek growth and development but the final outcome is far from what is regarded as healthy maturity. Through these characters who go against the tide, Baek criticizes the power of influence and questions what we consider to be the “norm.”

Ghosts also make regular appearances in the collection The Errand Boy at the Manor, but they are not the kind that appear in fairy tales and fantasy; they, in fact, represent our everyday reality and here lies the true terror—to become an adult means to become a member of a depraved society; therefore, the everyday reality that adults dominate is in itself terrifying. In Cotton Field Bizarre Story, this quotidian terror manifests itself in kidnappings, murders, violence, perverse sexual acts, and sadomasochistic practices. In Rusher, the same terror is expressed in surreal descriptions about a dystopian society. Through these works, Baek seems to be suggesting that the real world is nothing more than perhaps a somewhat exaggerated fictional space that disregards ethics, morals, and common sense.

== Works in Korean (Partial) ==
Novels

- I Loved Candy (expanded to a novel in 1996)
- Hey, We’re Going on a Picnic (1995)
- Poor Boy Hans (1998)
- Cotton Field Bizarre Story (2000)
- Farm for Dead Owls (2003),
- Rusher (2003)

Linked Story Collections

- Sixteen Tales from Believe It or Not Museum (1997)

Novellas

- The Errand Boy at the Manor (2001)
