= The Penguin Book of Korean Short Stories =

2023 short story anthology edited by Bruce Fulton

- Editor: Bruce Fulton
- Publisher: Penguin Classics
- Publication date: April 27, 2023
- ISBN: 978-0241448489

The Penguin Book of Korean Short Stories is a 2023 short story anthology edited by Bruce Fulton. The introduction was written by Kwon Youngmin. Marking the first collection of Korean literature in the Penguin Classics series, the book's 26 short stories span the years of 1934 to 2013 and are arranged thematically.

== Critical reception ==
Asian Review of Books admired the book's curation spearheaded by Fulton and called it "a truly fine collection of Korean stories" but wished that more stories from North Korea were included.

Korean Quarterly called the book "a delightful collection of modern Korean short stories" and lauded Fulton's discretion in showing a diverse array of writers, stories, and experiences.

Literary Review lauded Fulton's judgment of "what makes a good anthology" commended the book as "a literature bound to the events of a tumultuous century, one that holds up to the light all the tragedies, great and small, of its upheavals."

== Table of contents ==
Title	Author	Translator
Tradition
"When the Buckwheat Blooms"	Yi Hyoseok	Kim Chong-un and Bruce Fulton
"A Man Called Hǔngbo"	Chae Man-sik	Ross King, Bruce Fulton, and Ju-Chan Fulton
"Mama and the Boarder"	Chu Yosǒp	Kim Chong-un and Bruce Fulton
"The Old Hatter"	Yi Munyeol	Suh Ji-moon
"Pig on Grass"	Kim Taeyong	Bruce Fulton and Ju-Chan Fulton
Women and Men
"A Day in the Life of Kubo the Novelist"	Park Taewon	Sunyoung Park, Jefferson J. A. Gatrall, and Kevin O'Rourke
"Spicebush Blossoms"	Gim Yujeong	Bruce Fulton and Ju-Chan Fulton
"The Last of Hanak'o"	Choe Yun	Bruce Fulton and Ju-Chan Fulton
A chapter from Hwang Chini	Hong Sok-jung	Bruce Fulton and Ju-Chan Fulton
"Needlework"	Ch'ǒn Unyǒng	Na-Young Bae and Bruce Fulton
Peace and War
"Time for You and Me"	Hwang Sun-won	Bruce Fulton and Ju-Chan Fulton
"Winter Outing"	Pak Wansŏ	Marshall R. Pihl
"Land of Exile"	Cho Chǒngnae	Marshall R. Pihl
Hell Chosǒn
"Wings"	Yi Sang	Kevin O'Rourke
"Seoul: Winter 1964"	Kim Sǔngok	Marshall R. Pihl
"Wayfarer"	O Chong-hui	Bruce Fulton and Ju-Chan Fulton
"House on the Prairie"	Shin Kyung-sook	Bruce Fulton and Ju-Chan Fulton
"The First Anniversary"	P'yǒn Hyeyǒng	Cindy Chen, Bruce Fulton, and Ju-Chan Fulton
"River Dark"	Choi Suchol	Bruce Fulton and Ju-Chan Fulton
Into the New World
"The Poplar Tree"	Choe Inho	Bruce Fulton and Ju-Chan Fulton
"The Bone Thief"	Hwang Chǒngǔn	Bruce Fulton and Ju-Chan Fulton
"Home on the Range"	Jung Young-moon	Bruce Fulton and Ju-Chan Fulton
"The Glass Shield"	Kim Chunghyǒk	Kevin O'Rourke
"Black-and-White Photographer"	Han Yujoo	Janet Hong
"The Future of Silence"	Kim Aeran	Bruce Fulton and Ju-Chan Fulton
