= Bruce Fulton =

American professor of Korean literature

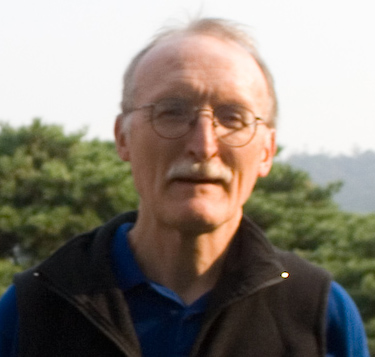
Bruce Fulton.

Bruce Fulton is an American professor of Korean Literature and a noted translator of contemporary Korean fiction with an extensive list of publications. He has lived in the United States, Canada, and South Korea, and is married to fellow translator Ju-Chan Fulton.

== Life ==
Fulton received his Bachelor of Arts in philosophy from Bowdoin College in 1970, his Master of Arts in Korea Regional Studies from the University of Washington in 1983, and his Ph.D. in Modern Korean Literature from Seoul National University.

Fulton and his wife, Ju-Chan, met at Seoul National University in 1978, while Fulton was volunteering in the Peace Corps. They married in 1979 and eventually realized that together they were "the ideal translation team," as Bruce was a native speaker of English who knew [Korean, and Ju-Chan was a native speaker of Korean who knew English. He also won The Korea Times Modern Korean Literature Translation Awards three times, in 1985, 1987, and 1989.

Fulton is the inaugural holder of the Young-Bin Min Chair in Korean Literature and Literary Translation in the Department of Asian Studies, University of British Columbia. Fulton has also won several awards, including Korea's Daesan Foundation's translation prize and the 2018 Manhae Literature Grand Prize.

== Career ==
Fulton has translated a variety of works, including novels (such as Cho Se-hui’s The Dwarf) and anthologies (such as Land of Exile, The Red Room, Lost Souls: Stories by Hwang Sunwon.) Fulton almost always works in partnership with his wife, Ju-Chan Fulton, in translating works from Korean to English.

One of Fulton's more recent translation is River of Fire and Other Stories by O Chonghui which contains nine stories, written from 1968 to 1994, describing family dysfunction, the decline of tradition, and lost love from a woman's perspective. Recently, he has translated The Future of Silence, which uses some stories by older writers and stories by newer writers such as Kim Sagwa, Han Yujoo, Kim Ae-ran, and Cheon Un-yeong. His most recent translation is The Human Jungle by Cho Chongnae.

As a professor, Fulton works in the Department of Asian Studies at the University of British Columbia, where he teaches modern Korean literature and researches modern Korean fiction and its translation.

== Translations ==
(with Ju-Chan Fulton unless otherwise indicated)

- From Stepping Stones to Stories: 120 Years of Korean Americans (Consulate General of the Republic of Korea in Seattle, 2025)
- Chinatown by Oh Jung-hee (Penguin UK Modern Classics, 2025)
- Togani by Gong Ji-young (University of Hawaiʻi Press, 2023)
- One Left by Kim Sum (University of Washington Press, 2020)
- The Catcher in the Loft by Cheon Unyeong (Codhill Press, 2020)
- Mina by Kim Sagwa (Two Lines Press, 2018)
- Sunset: A Ch'ae Manshik Reader (works by Chae Man-sik) (Columbia University Press, 2017)
- Moss by Yoon Tae-ho
- The Human Jungle by Jo Jeong-rae (Chin Music Press, 2016)
- The Moving Fortress by Hwang Sun-won (MerwinAsia, 2016)
- Juvesenility by Chae Man-sik (ASIA Publishers, 2015)
- Leaves of Grass by Yi Hyoseok (ASIA Publishers, 2015)
- An Idiot's Delight by Yi Taejun (ASIA Publishers, 2015) - with Kim Chong-un
- Mama and the Boarder by Ju Yoseop (ASIA Publishers, 2015) - with Kim Chong-un
- Another Man's City by Choe Inho (Dalkey Archive Press, 2014)
- And Then the Festival by Yi Hyegyeong (ASIA Publishers, 2014)
- In the Trunk by Jeong Yi-hyeon (ASIA Publishers, 2013)
- River of Fire and Other Stories by O Jeonghui (Columbia University Press, 2012)
- How in Heaven's Name by Jo Jeong-rae (MerwinAsia, 2012)
- The Man Who Was Left as Nine Pairs of Shoes by Yun Heunggil (ASIA Publishers, 2012)
- The Last of Hanak'o by Choe Yun (ASIA Publishers, 2012)
- Chinatown by O Jeonghui (ASIA Publishers, 2012)
- Human Decency by Gong Jiyeong (ASIA Publishers, 2012)
- Lost Souls: Stories by Hwang Sun-won (Columbia University Press, 2009)
- There a Petal Silently Falls: Three Stories by Choe Yun (Columbia University Press, 2008) - tr. "Whisper Yet" with Kim Kichung
- The Dwarf by Jo Sehui (University of Hawaiʻi Press, 2005)
- Trees on a Slope by Hwang Sun-won (University of Hawaiʻi Press, 2005)
- The Last of Hanak'o by Choe Yun (Jimoondang, 2003)
- Chinatown by O Jeonghui (Jimoondang, 2003)
- A Man by Hwang Sun-won (Jimoondang, 2003)
- Deep Blue Night by Choe Inho (Jimoondang, 2002)
- Crows by Yi Tae-jun, in Reunion So Far Away: A Collection of Contemporary Korean Fiction (Korean National Commission for Unesco, 1994), pp. 5–21
- Mother: A Play by Jang Jeongil, in Korea Journal, October 1989, pp. 56–62
- The Moving Castle by Hwang Sun-won (Si-sa-yong-o-sa, 1985)
- Debasement and Other Stories by Song Ki-jo (Fremont Publishers, 1983)

== Edited volumes ==
- The Penguin Book of Korean Short Stories (Penguin UK, 2023)
- Modern Korean Fiction: An Anthology, with Kwon Youngmin (Columbia University Press, 2005)
- Waxen Wings: The Acta Koreana Anthology of Short Fiction From Korea (Koryo Press, 2011)
- The Future of Silence: Fiction by Korean Women (Zephyr Press, 2016)
- The Red Room: Stories of Trauma in Contemporary Korea (University of Hawaiʻi Press, 2009)
- Land of Exile: Contemporary Korean Fiction, revised and expanded edition (M. E. Sharpe, 2007) - with Marshall R. Pihl
- A Ready-Made Life: Early Masters of Modern Korean Fiction (University of Hawaiʻi Press, 1998) - with Kim Chong-un
- Wayfarer: New Fiction by Korean Women (Women in Translation, 1997)
- Land of Exile: Contemporary Korean Fiction (M. E. Sharpe, 1993) - with Marshall R. Pihl
- Words of Farewell: Stories by Korean Women Writers (Seal Press, 1989)

== Textbook ==
- What Is Korean Literature? with Kwon Youngmin (Institute of East Asian Studies, University of California, Berkeley, 2020)
