= Sang-woo =

- Hangul: 상우
- RR: Sangu
- MR: Sangu

Sang-woo is a Korean given name.

== People ==
People with this name include:

=== Entertainment industry ===
- Lee Sang-woo (director) (born 1971), South Korean film director
- Kwon Sang-woo (born 1976), South Korean actor
- Lee Sang-woo (born 1980), South Korean actor
- Do Sang-woo (born 1987), South Korean actor
- Roy Kim (born Kim Sang-woo, 1993), South Korean singer-songwriter
- Chae Sang-woo (born 1999), South Korean actor

=== Sportspeople ===
- Lee Sang-u (born 1943, South Korean rower
- Kim Sang-woo (volleyball) (born 1973), South Korean volleyball player
- Kim Sang-woo (referee) (born 1975), South Korean football referee
- Sin Sang-woo (footballer) (born 1976), South Korean football defender (K-League Challenge)
- Kim Sang-woo (footballer, born 1987), South Korean midfielder
- Shin Sang-woo (ice hockey) (born 1987), South Korean professional ice hockey winger
- Kang Sang-woo (born 1993), South Korean football midfielder (K-League)
- Cho Sang-woo (born 1994), South Korean baseball pitcher (Korea Baseball Organization)

=== Other ===
- Park Sangwoo (born 1958), South Korean writer

== Fictional characters ==
Fictional characters with this name include:

- Yoon Sang-woo, from the 2009−2010 television series Wife Returns
- Lee Sang-woo, from the 2012 television series Seoyoung, My Daughter
- Oh Sang-woo, from the 2016−2019 comics series Killing Stalking
- Cho Sang-woo, from the 2021 Netflix series Squid Game
- Chu Sang-woo, from the 2022 television series Semantic Error

== See also ==
- List of Korean given names
