= Suh Ji-moon =

South Korean literary academic (born 1948)

Ji-moon Suh
- Native name: 서지문
- Born: March 28, 1948 (age 78) Cheongju, North Chungcheong Province, South Korea (then under US administration)
- Occupation: Professor of English literature Translator; Literary critic columnist
- Language: Korean, English
- Education: Ewha Womans University (B.A. in English Literature); University of West Georgia(M.A. in English); State University of New York at Albany (Ph.D. in English)

Ji-Moon Suh (Korean: 서지문; Hanja: 徐之文; Korean pronunciation: [sʌ.dʑi.mun]; born on March 28, 1948) is a South Korean literary scholar, translator, columnist, and professor of English literature.

Suh has devoted her life to introducing Korean literature to international readers by translating more than 20 Korean short stories into English, most of which are set against the backdrop of Post-war Korea. Her most well-known translations include The Rainy Spell and Other Stories, The Golden Phoenix: Seven Contemporary Korean Short Stories (1999), and House with a Sunken Courtyard (2013).

She has received numerous awards such as the PEN Literary Prize in the Category of Translation, The Republic of Korea Literary Award in the Category of Translation, and the LTI Korea Translation Award for her contribution to literary translation.

Suh has also worked as a columnist for various sources including The Chosun Ilbo, expressing her opinions on political and social issues. Suh's columns provide information about renowned books interlinked with her commentary on various issues such as Gapjil (갑질, power tripping), violence against women, accepting refugees, international politics, and South Korea's relations with North Korea.

She is currently a professor in the Department of English Language and Literature at Korea University.

== Personal life ==
Ji-Moon Suh was born in Cheongju, Chungcheongbuk-do, South Korea on March 28, 1948. as the youngest of three sisters. For her schooling Suh attended Kyunggi Girls' Middle School, Kyunggi Girls' High School, and then enrolled in Ewha Womans University in 1965. When she was in college, she met Kathleen J. Crane, a missionary and professor teaching English Language and Literature. Suh learned English composition and creative writing from Crane and created an English newspaper with Crane in her senior year. According to Suh, Crane gave her the courage to do something meaningful for society. From 1968 to 1969, Suh worked for The Korean Herald, an English-language newspaper in Korea.

After working for The Korean Herald, Suh left for the United States to study English literature. She received her master's degree in English from the University of West Georgia and earned her doctorate in English literature at the State University of New York at Albany. She mentioned in an interview that when she had to choose the school to pursue her academic endeavors as a Fulbright scholar, she decided to attend the State University of New York at Albany despite being eligible to study at Columbia University. As the State University of New York at Albany offered her a scholarship, her choice would allow the Fulbright program to fund another student's studies abroad.

Suh completed her Ph.D. program in 1978. Afterward, she re-engaged herself in journalism and contributed columns to The Korea Times every week, for two years. Several of her columns were later published in the book Faces in the Well in 1988. In 1978, Suh also started to work as a professor in the Department of English Language and Literature at Korea University.

From 1983 to 1984, Suh was commissioned to work as a visiting professor at SOAS University of London by the National Research Foundation of Korea. During this time, Suh taught both Korean studies and Korean literature. Suh also served as a research professor at the Harvard-Yenching Institute from September 1988 to June 1989, and then at Stanford University from 1999 to 2001.

Suh retired in 2013. She is currently a Professor Emeritus at Korea University and a member of Seoul National University's college board.

== Translation of Korean Literature ==
Throughout her career, Ji-moon Suh has dedicated herself to translating Korean literature into English and introducing it to international readers. Ji-moon Suh's first translated work is The Rainy Spell and Other Stories (한국중단편소설선, 1983), which was published in the United States in 1983. The book is a collection of 14 Korean short stories, including The Rainy Spell (장마, 1973) by Yun Heunggil, a story that illustrates the agony Koreans suffered during the Korean War. The Rainy Spell and Other Korean Stories has been used as course material for teaching Korean literature in several American universities. Philip West, who is the Mansfield Professor of Modern Asian Affairs at the University of Montana, stated that he used Suh's translation of The Rainy Spell as material for teaching American students about the Korean War. He stated that the text successfully conveyed the realities of the war to students who were unfamiliar with the topic, "better than any other text or film available at the time and certainly better than any of my classroom lectures." West also mentioned that discovering The Rainy Spell also prompted him to start the project, "America's Wars in Asia: A Cultural Approach." The project aims to incorporate Asian perspectives in research about the wars in the Asia Pacific, Korea, and Vietnam.

While Suh is known as an exemplary figure in translating novels, she also translated poetry—her translated work Brother Enemy: Poems of the Korean War is a collection of more than a hundred poems by 21 writers who were enlisted as soldiers in the Korean War. The poem collection captures the various perspectives of the witnesses of the Korean War and what the Korean War meant to many Korean soldiers. Suh's translations have helped international audiences learn about the trauma caused by the Korean War and the varying perspectives of individual soldiers who experienced it.

The works translated, or co-translated by Ji-moon Suh include:

- Brother Enemy: Poems of the Korean War (2002) (Original Work: 한국전쟁 시선집) ISBN 978-1893996205
- The Golden Phoenix: Seven Contemporary Korean Short Stories (1999) (Original Work: 금시조: 한국현대중편소설선) ISBN 978-0894108624
- The Rainy Spell and Other Korean Stories (1983) (Original Work: 한국중단편소설선) ISBN 978-0906383179
- The Descendants of Cain (1997) (Original Work: 카인의 후예 (1954) by 황순원 (Hwang Sun-won)) ISBN 978-0765601360
- An Appointment with My Brother (2002) (Original Work: 아우와의 만남 (2001) by 이문열 (Yi Munyeol)) ISBN 9788988095645
- House with a Sunken Courtyard (2013) (Original Work: 마당 깊은 집 (1997) by 김원일 (Kim Won-il)) ISBN 978-1564789136

When it comes to translation, Suh values readers' understanding not only of what the text means on its surface level but also of the culture and tradition that profoundly influence the text.

In an interview, Suh stated:

I try to translate the text so that readers can feel and understand the history, traditions, and customs of Korea, as well as the common sense, consciousness, and emotions shared by Koreans through my translation.

Also, Suh adds that she would like to provide foreign readers with a proper translation of Korean literature based on her knowledge and understanding of Korea, under the belief that a good translation only derives from a deep understanding of the source material. In another interview, Suh stated:

I want to devote all my efforts to properly translating works with elements that cannot be sufficiently understood or empathized only through linguistic knowledge, such as our tumultuous history, the characteristic Korean consciousness, Korean traditions and customs, and the intense division and conflict that took place in modern Korean history, so that the world can accurately understand Korea and Koreans.

== Editorial Work ==
Suh co-edited the book Remembering the Forgotten War: The Korean War Through Literature and Art (ISBN 978-0765606969) published in 2001, which attempted to understand the Korean War through a "cultural approach" with a collection of poems, photographs, visual arts, and stories produced by people who experienced the Korean War, such as Korean and American soldiers, Chinese prisoners of war, American war correspondents, and Korean civilians. The book features Korean poems translated by Suh and her contribution to the book was met with positive reviews. In a review published in Acta Koreana, David McCann, director of the Korean Institute at Harvard University, stated that "the second [chapter] by Suh Ji-moon, introduces a number of Korean poems about the Korean War, a good sampling, with helpful comments about recurrent themes and images." Jeffrey Miller, a senior teacher and level coordinator of the Institute of Language Research & Education at Yonsei University, stated that "Suh Ji-moon's insightful and poignant essays on these poets and writers explore how Koreans felt about the war with its devastation, horrors, pain, and suffering…her analysis of these works, delves into the very essence of the fratricidal nature of the war and how the writers and poets responded.

Suh also contributed to making Korean literature more accessible to an international audience by creating English articles about Korean writers. Her online English Britannica article about the Korean writer Yi Munyol, who is one of Korea's most prominent novelists, was uploaded in 2010. In her article, she details Yi Munyol's personal life, his most notable works, award history, and his contribution to Korean literature. Suh also provides cultural and historical context for Yi Munyol's major works, such as Son of Man (사람의 아들, 1979), The Age of Heroes (영웅시대, 1984), and You Can't Go Home Again (그대 다시는 고향에 가지 못하리, 1980).

== Award History ==
In 1984, Suh received The Republic of Korea Literary Award in the Category of Translation from the Korean Culture and Arts Foundation. This award is given to those who have contributed to the Korean literary field.

In 2000, she got the PEN Literary Prize in the Category of Translation for The Golden Phoenix (금시조: 한국현대중편소설선, 1999), the translation of a collection of stories that vividly capture Korean life in the 1940s to the 1990s. The PEN Literary Prize was awarded by PEN Korea, which joined PEN International in the annual PEN International Congress in 1955.

In 2014, she won the LTI Korea Translation Award from the Literature Translation Institute of Korea. The Literature Translation Institute of Korea aims to recognize Korean translators who promote Korea's literary works and media content worldwide. Suh won the award for translating Kim Won-il's House with a Sunken Courtyard (마당 깊은 집, 2013) into English.

== Selected publications ==
=== Edited Book ===
- Remembering the "Forgotten War": The Korean War Through LIterature and Art (2001)

(edited by Philip West and Suh Ji-Moon)

=== Authored Books ===
- Life Skill: Victorian Writing, Research of Thinker's Theory of Ethics and Beauty (인생의 기술: 빅토리아조 문필, 사상가들의 윤리적미학이론 연구, 1986)
- Collection of Columns: Covetting Idiocracy (칼럼집: 어리석음을 탐하여, 1998)
- English Collection of Columns: Faces in the Well (영문 칼럼집 Faces in the Well, 2000)
- Learning the Analects of Confucius in English 1 & 2 (영어로 배우는 논어 1 &2, 2001)
- Confucius, adored by Asia and loved by the West (동양인이 흠모한 공자, 서양인이 사랑한 공자 1&2, 2012)
- Ji-Moon Suh's Life in Novels (서지문의 소설 속 인생, 2013)
- The Light and Darkness of English Gentlemen's Code of Honors, Seen by British Novels (영국소설을 통해 본 영국신사도의 명암, 2014)
- Ji-Moon Suh's Reading Novels in the News Media 1 & 2 (서지문의 뉴스로 책 읽기 1 & 2, 2018–2020)

== Columns ==
Ji-Moon Suh has been active in speaking out her opinions on social and political issues. Suh worked as a writer for the social and cultural section of The Chosun Ilbo, one of the major newspapers in South Korea, and contributed around 200 columns. The contributed columns were later published in the books Ji-Moon Suh's Reading Novels in the News Media 1 & 2 (서지문의 뉴스로 책 읽기 1 & 2, 2018-2020). Many news outlets describe her writing style as "sharp, relentless, and intense," "criticizing authority like an orator," and "fiery and some saying it is venomous when she rebukes contradictions in our society." While Suh's columns were highly popular with conservative audiences, some criticized Suh's columns for leaning too much to the right. An article by the Citizens' Coalition for Democratic Media (민주시민언론연합) criticized Suh's column about former president Park Geun-hye's letters in prison for being "overly emotional" and praising former president Park, letting her manipulation of state affairs slide. The article claimed that Suh was overlooking Park's attempts to interfere in the general election through the letters. An article in The Hankyoreh also criticized Suh for being a fearmonger against the Moon administration, which followed the impeachment of President Park. The article censured Suh's column's speculation that the North Korean flag would be seen in Seoul's skies as exaggerated.

Concerning the criticism that her columns are too right-leaning, Suh stated:

In times like this, one should clearly express one's thoughts. I do not think that it would benefit the country or the people for me to find a balance between the right and left.
