= Kim Sum =

South Korean writer (born 1974)

- 김숨
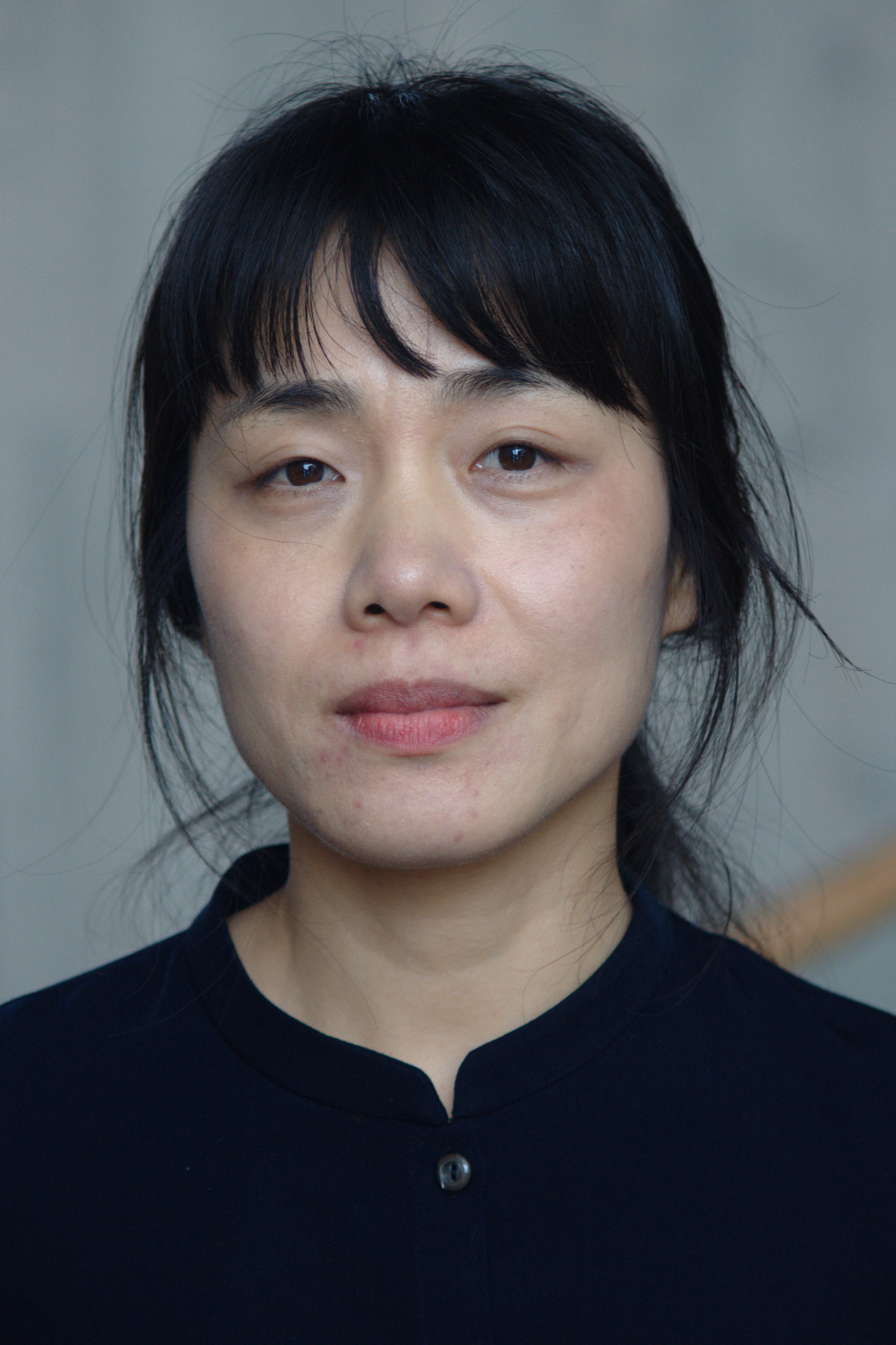
- Kim Sum at the Museum of World Culture in Gothenburg, 2019
- Born: July 23, 1974 (age 52); Bangeojin, Ulsan, South Korea
- Citizenship: South Korean
- Education: Daejeon University
- Occupation: Novelist
- Writing career
- Language: Korean

Korean name
- Hangul: 김수진
- RR: Gim Sujin
- MR: Kim Sujin

Pen name
- Hangul: 김숨
- RR: Gim Sum
- MR: Kim Sum

Kim Sum (born Kim Sujin, 23 July 1974) is a South Korean writer, best known as the author of One Left (한명, 2016), a novel dealing with the issue of Korean comfort women in the Imperial Japanese Army.

== Life ==
Kim Sum was born in 1974 at a seaside town in Bangeojin, Ulsan, South Korea. When she was six, her father went to the Middle East for a manual labor job, leaving the rest of the family to move into her grandfather's house in Geumsan County, South Chungcheong Province, where she ended up spending her childhood. Upon entering high school, she joined a literature club, the Cheong-un Literary Society, and dabbled in writing poetry. In 1997 she published her first short story, "On Slowness" (느림에 대하여), in the Daejeon Ilbo, which won their New Writer's Award. Kim said she had written the story because she wanted to experiment with longer pieces of writing, rather than just poetry. A year later in 1998 she published another short story, "Time in the Middle Ages" (중세의 시간), which won the Munhakdongne New Writer Award, and Kim decided to become a writer.

After graduating from university, Kim Sum worked as a proofreader for a newspaper outside of Seoul, and then as an editor for a publishing house for many years.

== Career ==
Kim Sum debuted as a writer when some of her short stories were selected for publications by the Daejeon Ilbo in 1997 and Munhakdongne in 1998. Known for her "elaborate descriptions and aesthetic style" and "vivid allegories", Kim Sum has been a prolific writer since her debut, publishing numerous short story collections and novels. Many of her works, particularly more recent novels such as One Left (한명) or L's Sneakers (L의 운동화), critically examine modern and contemporary Korean history and related topics, such as Korean independence from Imperial Japan, the Korean War, South Korean democratization, and more. While One Left (한명) tells the story of Korean comfort women who were sexually abused by Imperial Japanese soldiers, L's Sneakers (L의 운동화) retells the story of student activist Lee Han-yeol, whose injuries and later death strongly influenced the June Democratic Struggle of 1987. Both novels focus on more recent historical events that have been critical to forming a national identity amongst South Koreans.

Kim Sum is the recipient of multiple literary recognitions, including the Contemporary Literature (Hyundae Munhak) Award, the Daesan Literary Awards for fiction, the Yi Sang Literary Award, and the Dongri Literature Prize. Several of her works have been translated into other languages, including One Left, which was longlisted for the International Dublin Literary Award in 2022.

== Works in Korean ==
- "On Slowness" (느림에 대하여, 1997)
- "Time in the Middle Ages" (중세의 시간, 1998)
- Fighting Dog (투견, 2005)
- Bed (침대, 2007)
- Idiots (백치들, 2006)
- Iron (철, 2008)
- My Beautiful Sinners (나의 아름다운 죄인들, 2009)
- Water (물, 2010)
- Liver and Gallbladder (간과 쓸개, 2011)
- To Abandon the Yellow Dog (노란 개를 버리러, 2011)
- Women and Their Evolving Enemies (여인들과 진화하는 적들, 2013)
- Noodles (국수, 2014)
- Woman Sewing (바느질하는 여자, 2015)
- L's Sneakers (L의 운동화, 2016)
- One Person (한 명, 2016)
- Your God (당신의 신, 2017)
- Flowing Letters (흐르는 편지, 2018)
- Have You Ever Wished for a Soldier To Become an Angel?: The Testimony of Japanese Military "Comfort Woman" Gil Won-ok (군인이 천사가 되기를 바란 적 있는가 - 일본군'위안부' 길원옥 증언집, 2018)
- The Sublime Is Looking into Me: The Testimony of Japanese Military "Comfort Woman" Kim Bok-dong (숭고함은 나를 들여다보는 거야 - 일본군'위안부' 김복동 증언집, 2018)
- "Divorce" (이혼)
- "The Night Nobody Comes Back" (아무도 돌아오지 않는 밤)
- "Disappearing Memories" (사라지는 기억)
- "Hometown Address" (고향집 주소)
- "Song" (노래)
- "That Night with Gyeongsuk" (그 밤의 경숙)
- "Silent Night, Holy Night" (고요한 밤, 거룩한 밤)
- "In Search of the Perfect Place" (명당을 찾아서)
- "A Day To Go to Okcheon" (옥천 가는 날)

== Works in translation ==
- One Left (University of Washington Press, 2020), translated by Bruce Fulton and Ju-Chan Fulton ISBN 978-0-295-74766-8
- Divorce (Strangers Press, 2019), translated by Emily Yae Won ISBN 978-1-911-34361-5
- The Night Nobody Returns Home (ASIA Publishers, 2014), translated by Jean Miseli ISBN 979-1-156-62035-8

== Awards ==
- 1997: Daejeon Ilbo New Writer’s Award for "On Slowness" (느림에 대하여)
- 1998: Munhakdongne New Writer Award for "Time in the Middle Ages" (중세의 시간)
- 2012: 7th Heo Gyun Literary Writer Award for "To Abandon the Yellow Dog" (노란 개를 버리러)
- 2013: Contemporary Literature (Hyundae Munhak) Award for "That Night with Gyeongsuk" (그 밤의 경숙)
- 2013: Daesan Literary Awards for "Women and Their Evolving Enemies" (여인들과 진화하는 적들).
- 2015: Yi Sang Literary Award for "The Story of Roots" (뿌리 이야기)
