= Quercus disciformis =

Conservation status
- Endangered (IUCN 3.1)

Scientific classification
- Kingdom: Plantae
- Clade: Embryophytes
- Clade: Tracheophytes
- Clade: Spermatophytes
- Clade: Angiosperms
- Clade: Eudicots
- Clade: Rosids
- Order: Fagales
- Family: Fagaceae
- Genus: Quercus
- Subgenus: Quercus subg. Cerris
- Section: Quercus sect. Cyclobalanopsis
- Species: Q. disciformis

Binomial name
- Quercus disciformis Chun & Tsiang

Synonyms
- Cyclobalanopsis disciformis (Chun & Tsiang) Y.C.Hsu & H.Wei Jen

Species of tree

Quercus disciformis is a species of tree in the beech family. It is native to the provinces of Guangdong, Guangxi, Guizhou, Hainan, and Hunan in southern China and to northern Vietnam. It is placed in subgenus Cerris, section Cyclobalanopsis.

Quercus disciformis is a tree up to 14 meters tall with leaves as much as 14 cm long.
