= Quercus bella =

Conservation status
- Near Threatened (IUCN 3.1)

Scientific classification
- Kingdom: Plantae
- Clade: Embryophytes
- Clade: Tracheophytes
- Clade: Spermatophytes
- Clade: Angiosperms
- Clade: Eudicots
- Clade: Rosids
- Order: Fagales
- Family: Fagaceae
- Genus: Quercus
- Subgenus: Quercus subg. Cerris
- Section: Quercus sect. Cyclobalanopsis
- Species: Q. bella

Binomial name
- Quercus bella Chun & Tsiang (1947)

Synonyms
- Cyclobalanopsis bella (Chun & Tsiang) Chun ex Y.C.Hsu & H.Wei Jen (1993)

Species of oak tree

Quercus bella is an uncommon species of oak tree. It is native to Guangdong, Guangxi, Yunnan, and Hainan provinces of southern China and to northern Vietnam. It is placed in subgenus Cerris, section Cyclobalanopsis.

Quercus bella is a tree up to 30 meters tall, with leaves as much as 15 cm long.

It grows in humid hill and mountain forests from 200 to 1,172 metres elevation.
