= Quercus delicatula =

Conservation status
- Endangered (IUCN 3.1)

Scientific classification
- Kingdom: Plantae
- Clade: Embryophytes
- Clade: Tracheophytes
- Clade: Spermatophytes
- Clade: Angiosperms
- Clade: Eudicots
- Clade: Rosids
- Order: Fagales
- Family: Fagaceae
- Genus: Quercus
- Subgenus: Quercus subg. Cerris
- Section: Quercus sect. Cyclobalanopsis
- Species: Q. delicatula

Binomial name
- Quercus delicatula Chun & Tsiang

Synonyms
- Cyclobalanopsis delicatula (Chun & Tsiang) Y.C.Hsu & H.Wei Jen

Species of tree

Quercus delicatula is an Asian species of trees in the beech family. It has been found only in southern China, in the Provinces of Guangdong, Guangxi, and Hunan. It is placed in subgenus Cerris, section Cyclobalanopsis.

Quercus delicatula is a tree up to 20 meters tall with reddish-brown hairs covering the twigs and the undersides of the leaves, the leaves as much as 12 cm long.
