= Quercus phanera =

Conservation status
- Endangered (IUCN 3.1)

Scientific classification
- Kingdom: Plantae
- Clade: Embryophytes
- Clade: Tracheophytes
- Clade: Spermatophytes
- Clade: Angiosperms
- Clade: Eudicots
- Clade: Rosids
- Order: Fagales
- Family: Fagaceae
- Genus: Quercus
- Subgenus: Quercus subg. Cerris
- Section: Quercus sect. Cyclobalanopsis
- Species: Q. phanera

Binomial name
- Quercus phanera Chun

Synonyms
- Cyclobalanopsis phanera (Chun) Y.C.Hsu & H.Wei Jen; Quercus basellata Chun & W.C.Ko; Quercus insularis Chun & P.C.Tam

Species of tree

Quercus phanera is an uncommon Asian species of tree in the beech family. It is native to the provinces of Guangxi and Hainan in southern China. It is placed in subgenus Cerris, section Cyclobalanopsis.

Quercus phanera is a tree up to 25 meters tall. Twigs are grayish brown. Leaves can be as much as 15 cm long.
