= The Tae Baek Mountains =

1983 Korean novel by Jo Jung-Rae

- Author: Jo Jung-rae
- Original title: 태백산맥
- Language: Korean
- Genre: Roman-Fleuve

The Tae Baek Mountains (Korean: 태백산맥) is a South Korean roman-fleuve written by Jo Jung-rae. It was published serially by through Hyeondae Munhak (현대문학; lit. 'modern literature') and Hanguk Munhak (한국문학; lit. 'Korean literature') from September 1983 to November 1989. It was published as 10 volumes by Hangilsa (한길사) in 1989 and again by Haenaemsa (해냄사) in 1995.

== Plot ==
After Japanese colonial rule over Korea ended, the tension between left-wing and right-wing increased in the Korean Peninsula. In the town of Beolgyo-eup, Boseong County, South Jeolla Province, Yeom Sang-jin and the communist partisans capture the town temporarily when the Yeosu–Suncheon rebellion of 1948 occurred. But soon they are routed and sneak into Jirisan. When they were in power, they executed many landlords and many of the former so-called chinilpa. This led to the collocation of the troops from government near Beolgyo. South Korean government troops, officers and right wing henchmen are trying to mop up the communist partisans. The partisans and left-wing intellectuals act secretly against South Korean government. When the Korean War breaks out, the communist partisans seize the town again with the help of the Soviet Red Army and Chinese People's Volunteer Army.

== Assessment ==
This roman-fleuve describe well the fierce ideological conflict between political groups and the tragic stories of victims. The right-wing criticized that the book benefits the enemy and persecuted the author. But many Korean students and intellectuals loved the work. In the novel, many characters use their own Jeolla dialects, and the scene of Beolgyo was portrayed in detail like a watercolor picture.

== Awards ==
- The Best Work in the 1980s by 39 reporters and reviewers (JoongAng Literature 《문예중앙》, Summer 1988)
- Seong-Ok Culture Award (성옥문화상)
- The Best Controversial Work in the 1980s, by 48 reviewers.
- The Representative Work Breaking Prohibition in the 1980s (The Hankyoreh newspaper, 28 December 1989)
- Dong-Guk Literature Award (동국문학상)
- The Most Impressive Book, chosen by university students (JoongAng Ilbo, 26 November 1991)
- The Most Impressive Novel, chosen by 1000 Seoul National University students (The Chosun Ilbo, 23 July 1997)
