= Yi Sang Literary Award =

The Yi Sang Literary Award (이상문학상) is a South Korean literary award. It is one of South Korea's most prestigious literary awards, named after Yi Sang, an innovative writer in modern Korean literature. The Yi Sang Literary Award was established in 1977. It is sponsored by the Korean publisher Munhaksasangsa.

== Winners ==
- 1977 김승옥 Kim Seung-ok, 〈서울의 달빛 0장〉 The Moonlight of Seoul
- 1978 이청준 Yi Chong-Jun 〈잔인한 도시〉 The Cruel City
- 1979 오정희 Oh Jung-hee 〈저녁의 게임〉 Evening Game
- 1980 유재용 Yoo Jae-yong 〈관계〉 Relationship
- 1981 박완서 Park Wan-suh, 〈엄마의 말뚝〉 Mother’s Hitching Post
- 1982 최인호 Choi In-ho, 〈깊고 푸른 밤〉 Deep Blue Night
- 1983 서영은 So Yeong-eun, 〈먼 그대〉 Distant You
- 1984 이균영 Lee Kyun-young, 〈어두운 기억의 저편〉 The Other Side of Dark Remembrance
- 1985 이제하 Yi Jae-ha, 〈나그네는 길에서도 쉬지 않는다〉 Travelers do not rest even on the road
- 1986 최일남 Choi Il-nam, 〈흐르는 북〉 Flowing North
- 1987 이문열 Yi Mun-yol, 〈우리들의 일그러진 영웅〉 Our Twisted Hero
- 1988 임철우 Im Chul-woo, 〈붉은 방〉 The Red Room (co-winner)
- 1988 한승원 Han Seung-won, 〈해변의 길손〉 Beach Traveler (co-winner)
- 1989 김채원 Kim Chae-won, 〈겨울의 환幻〉 Annual Winter
- 1990 김원일 Kim Won-il, 〈마음의 감옥〉 Prison of the Heart
- 1991 조성기 Cho Sung-ki, 〈우리 시대의 소설가〉 The Novelist of Our Time
- 1992 양귀자 Yang Gui-ja, 〈숨은 꽃〉 The Hidden Flower
- 1993 최수철 Choi Suchol, 〈얼음의 도가니〉 The Ice Melting Pot
- 1994 최윤 Choe Yun, 〈하나코는 없다〉 The Last of Hanako
- 1995 윤후명 Yun Humyong, 〈하얀 배〉 White Boat
- 1996 윤대녕 Yun Dae-nyeong, 〈천지간〉 Between Heaven and Earth
- 1997 김지원 Kim Ji-won, 〈사랑의 예감〉 Premonition of Love
- 1998 은희경 Eun Hee-kyung, 〈아내의 상자〉 Wife’s Box
- 1999 박상우 Park Sangwoo, 〈내 마음의 옥탑방〉 The Rooftop Unit in my soul
- 2000 이인화 Lee In-hwa, 〈시인의 별〉 Poet’s Star
- 2001 신경숙 Shin Kyung-sook, 〈부석사〉 Buseoksa
- 2002 권지예 Kwan Ji-Hye, 〈뱀장어 스튜〉 Eel Stew
- 2003 김인숙 Kim In-sook, 〈바다와 나비〉 Ocean and Butterfly
- 2004 김훈 Kim Hoon, 〈화장〉 Cremation (Called "From Powder to Powder" in translation)
- 2005 한강 Han Kang, 〈몽고반점〉 Mongolian Mark (published in English as part of The Vegetarian)
- 2006 정미경 Jung Mikyung, 〈밤이여, 나뉘어라〉 Night, Let Split
- 2007 전경린 Jon Kyong-nin, 〈천사는 여기 머문다〉 An Angel Lives Here
- 2008 권여선 Kwon Yeo-sun, 〈사랑을 믿다〉 Believe in Love
- 2009 김연수 Kim Yeon-su, 〈산책하는 이들의 다섯 가지 즐거움〉 Five Pleasures for Those Who Take Walks
- 2010 박민규 Park Min-gyu, 〈아침의 문〉 The Door of Morning
- 2011 공지영 Gong Ji-young, 〈맨발로 글목을 돌다〉 Wander the alleyways barefoot
- 2012 김영하 Kim Young-ha, 〈옥수수와 나〉
- 2013 김애란 Kim Ae-ran, 〈침묵의 미래〉The future of Slience
- 2014 편혜영 Pyun Hye-young, 〈몬순〉Monsoon
- 2015 김숨 Kim Sum, 〈뿌리 이야기〉Story of Root
- 2016 김경욱 Kim Kyung-uk, 〈천국의 문〉
- 2017 구효서 Gu Hyo-seo, 〈풍경소리〉
- 2018 손홍규, 〈꿈을 꾸었다고 말했다〉
- 2019 윤이형 Yun I-hyeong, 〈그들의 첫 번째와 두 번째 고양이〉
- 2021 이승우 Lee Seung-u, 〈마음의 부력〉
- 2022 손보미 Son Bo-mi, 〈불장난〉
- 2023 최진영 Choi Jin-Young, 〈홈 스위트 홈〉 Home Sweet Home
- 2024 조경란 Jo Kyung-ran, 〈일러두기〉
