= Kim Sang-woo =

Kim Sang-woo may refer to:

- Kim Sang-woo (footballer, born 1987), South Korean footballer
- Kim Sang-woo (footballer, born 1994), South Korean footballer
- Kim Sang-woo (referee) (born 1975), South Korean football referee
- Kim Sang-woo (volleyball) (born 1973), South Korean volleyball player
