= The Rainy Spell =

"Jangma" (Korean: 장마; lit. 'rainy season'), name translated as "The Rainy Spell", is a Korean short story written by Yun Heunggil and published in 1973. The story, set in the midst of the on-going Korean War, is considered to be one of the writer's major works. It deals with the conflict and reconciliation between maternal and paternal grandmothers, whose sons chose different ideologies. The story mourns the pains of the war while expecting a bright future.

== Title ==
"The Rainy Spell" is a title and the time when the story takes place. In Korea, jangma refers to a rainy season in summer, which lasts from June to July. After the period, the weather begins heating up.

The rains during jangma are closely associated with how the narrative flows. Jangma starts at the beginning of the story and ends when all the conflicts are over. The rainfall is a tool showing escalating tension in the family, a metaphor for the Korean War that began in late June, and an implication that the divided Korea is not permanent but temporary.

== Plot ==
The narrator "I" in “The Rainy Spell” recalls the events that took place in his family during the Korean War in 1950. Back then his maternal uncle joins the military while his paternal uncle becomes a North Korean partisan. “I”, an elementary school student, unknowingly informs the whereabouts of his paternal uncle, which makes him hated by the narrator's paternal grandmother. However, as his maternal grandmother sides with him, the relationship between his maternal and paternal grandmother gets worse.

With the start of JAMA, the maternal grandmother receives the death notice of her son. The following day, the maternal grandmother curses toward the mountain where partisans reportedly hide and the paternal grandmother gets angry with her. The fortune teller predicts the return of the partisan uncle and tells the day when he will return. The paternal grandmother prepares to greet him. On the day when the partisan uncle is expected to come, a big snake appears instead of him and the paternal grandmother screams and loses consciousness. When other families are in confusion, the other grandmother treats the snake like the paternal uncle and has a ceremony by plucking a few of the paternal grandmother's hairs and burning them to lead the snake away. As the snake leaves the house, the confusion ends. The narrator's paternal grandmother, after regaining consciousness, expressed thanks to the maternal grandmother, which leads to the reconciliation of the two. Just before her death, the paternal grandmother forgives “I”.

== Analysis ==
In “The Rainy Spell”, paternal and maternal grandmothers had a good relationship but becomes in conflict because of their sons’ situations. Through the family's situation, the novel criticized the contradiction and violence of the Korean War. At the same time, it mourns those who died in the war, reconciles those who are in conflict and heals their sadness.

=== Style ===
The story of “The Rainy Spell” unfolds through the first-person narrator “I”. “I” is too young to understand the conflicts in the family caused by the Korean War. However, the boy narrator eventually grows up as he experiences events that go beyond his perception. This format was widely used in works published in the 1970s by Kim Won il, Lee Dong-ha, Park Wansuh, as well as Yun Heunggil. Given that the 1970s was a period when the ideologies of the Cold War were solidified, it seems that a child narrator, who is not bound by ideology, appeared in the works to explore new prospects to overcome the division.

Yun revealed that “The Rainy Spell” was based on the story of the father of his friend, poet Jeong Yang. Jeong's father disappeared just before the Korean War. It was said that a big snake came into the friend's house on the day when a fortune teller predicted that the missing father would return. Yun also experienced the Korean War in his childhood. His mother's side of the family lived in the house of their in-law, and his maternal uncle died during the war. Like this, “The Rainy Spell” is closely related to the sensibilities of the generation who experienced the Korean War in its childhood.

== Critical reception ==
There are largely two literary themes that Yun has continuously shown interest in. The first one is the Korean War and the country's divided situation, and the second is the process of industrialization accelerated since the 1970s. Among them, “The Rainy Spell” is a major work that deals deeply with the war and division.

“The Rainy Spell” is judged as a work which shows the possibility of restoring ethnic homogeneity through shamanism. Most critics agree with this idea, but opinions diverge when it comes to interpreting the ending part where the conflict between maternal and paternal grandmothers is resolved. Some criticized shamanistic behaviors that provide the cause of reconciliation in the novel while others argue that those acts can approach the source of life even though they are unrealistic.

There is also an interpretation that sees “The Rainy Spell” as a work focusing on the pain and sorrow of the war. From this point of view, the hostility between the two grandmothers is more of a lack of consideration than a difference of ideology or system. In addition, this interpretation believes that it is sympathy for each other, not shamanistic behaviors, which brings the reconciliation between the two grandmothers

== Adaptation ==
The short story was adapted into a film by director Yu Hyun-mok in 1979. Although the movie failed at the box office, it won the 18th Grand Bell Awards and was entered into the São Paulo International Film Festival. The movie is available on Korean Classic Film YouTube channel

== Bibliography ==
=== Editions ===
- Munhakgwa jiseong (문학과 지성 Literature and Intelligence) spring edition, 1973.
- Hwanghonui jip (황혼의 집 The House of Twilight), Moonji, 1979. (revised edition, 2007)

=== Translations ===
- English: The rainy spell and other Korean stories, M.E. Sharpe, 1998, Suh Ji-Moon.
- English: The rainy spell, Jimoondang, 2002, Suh Ji-Moon.
- French: La Mousson, Autres Temps, 2004, Hye-gyông, ImCathy Rapin.
- Spanish: Lluvias, Ediciones del Ermitaño, 2007, Kim Uh-sung Isabel, Ishiharada de Lee.
- Swedish: Regnperioden, Tranan, 2009, Leif Gustafsson, Ahruyn Gustafsson.
- Urdu: SUNEHRI QAQNAS, Mashal Books, 2007, Sajjad Karim Anjum.
- Japanese: 長雨, 東京新聞出版局, 1979, 姜舜.
- Chinese: 黑暗之魂: 韩国分断小说选, 上海译文出版社, 2004, 金冉.
