= Jo Jeong-rae =

South Korean writer (born 1943)

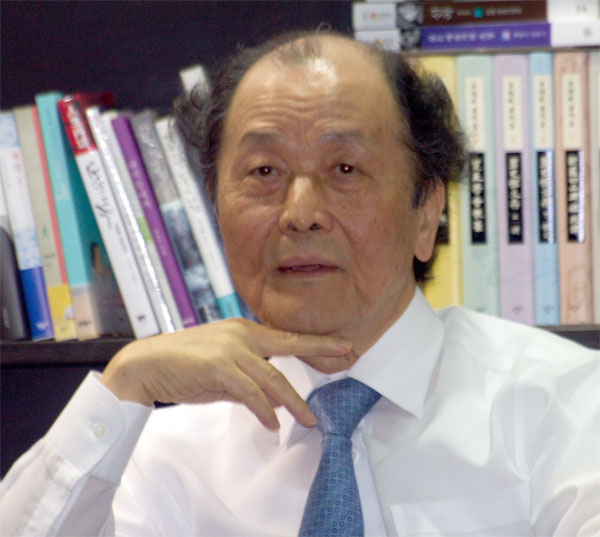
- Jo Jeong-rae at the Seoul International Book Fair
- Born: August 17, 1943 (age 83)
- Citizenship: South Korean
- Education: Dongguk University
- Writing career
- Language: Korean

- Jo Jeong-rae
- Hangul: 조정래
- Hanja: 趙廷來
- RR: Jo Jeongrae
- MR: Cho Chŏngnae

Jo Jeong-rae (Korean: 조정래; Hanja: 趙廷來; born August 17, 1943) is a novelist from South Korea, best known as the author of the best-selling novels Taebaek Mountain Range, Arirang, and Han River.

== Biography ==
Jo Jeong-rae was born in Suncheon, Jeollanam-do, in 1943 in the Sonamsa Temple. When the Korean War broke out, Jo Jeong-rae and his family evacuated to the South, where he was unpopular with the local children and frequently fought with them, fights he generally lost. He was interested in literature from early in life, and won competitions in elementary school. He majored in Korean literature at Dongguk University, and worked as a high school teacher for several years after graduation. His literary debut was in 1970 when he published the short story "A False Charge" (누명), after which he decided to devote his entire life to literature.

== Career ==
Jo Jeong-rae's popular multi-volume novels Taebaek Mountain Range (태백산맥, 1983-1989) and Arirang (아리랑, 1995), both of which have come to be considered modern classics since their publication in the 1980s, are widely considered to be the epitome of his talent. With the publication of his novel Han River (한강, 2002), Jo Jeong-rae finally completed his trilogy of works dedicated to modern Korean history. Sales of the series reached record-breaking numbers in South Korea, selling over 10 million copies.

The epic historical trilogy, begun in 1983 and eventually completed in 2002, comprises Jo Jeong-rae's three most well-known novels: Taebaek Mountain Range, Arirang, and Han River. Each novel is over ten volumes in length, and each deals with different aspects of the turbulent history of Korea in the modern era. The first novel, Taebaek Mountain Range, examines the five-year period between the liberation of Korea from Japanese colonial rule in 1945 to the outbreak of the Korean War in 1950, with detailed flashbacks and backstory contextualizing the deep ideological conflict that culminated in violence and the division of Korea. The second novel, Arirang, is technically a prequel to Taebaek Mountain Range, and covers the Japanese colonial period of Korean history.

One of the primary themes in Jo Jeong-rae's work, concern regarding the socio-economic roots of the division of Korea and the search for Korean reunification, is also present in his other, shorter works of fiction, particularly his later works, such as "Sorrow, That Shaded Place" (한 그 그늘의 자리), "Land of Exile" (유형의 땅), "Human Stairs" (인간의 계단), and "The Soul of a Barren Land" (박토의 혼). Many of his earlier works, however, such as "A Woman from Cheongsan" (청산댁), "The Violent Instructor" (퐁녀석 교사), "The Shaded Slope" (비탈진 음지), "The Age of Geocentrism" (천동설 시대), and "Foreign Land" (이방지대), tend to reconstruct stories of traditional rustic life, targeting and satirizing the various absurdities of life in a much more general fashion.

== Works ==
=== Works in Translation ===
- The Human Jungle (Chin Music Press, 2016), translated by Bruce Fulton and Ju-Chan Fulton ISBN 978-1634059107
- The Land of the Banished (ASIA Publishers, 2012), translated by Chun Kyung-Ja ISBN 9788988095515
- How in Heaven's Name (MerwinAsia, 2012), translated by Bruce Fulton and Ju-Chan Fulton ISBN 978-1937385170
- Playing with Fire (Cornell University Press, 2010), translated by Chun Kyung-Ja ISBN 9781885445858

=== Works in Korean (partial) ===
==== Novels ====
- ≪ Taebaek Mountain Range (태백산맥 1-10, 1983-1989)≫
- ≪Arirang (아리랑, 1995)≫
- ≪Han River (한강, 2002)≫
- ≪Human Jungle (정글만리, 2013)≫

==== Short stories ====
- ≪"Sorrow, That Shaded Place" (한 그 그늘의 자리, 1977)≫
- ≪"The Land of the Banished" (유형의 땅, 1981)≫
- ≪"Human Stairs" (인간의 계단, 1982)≫
- ≪"Soul of a Barren Land" (박토의 혼, 1983)≫
- ≪"A Woman from Cheongsan" (청산 댁, 1972)≫
- ≪"The Violent Instructor" (퐁녀석 교사, 1971)≫
- ≪"Shaded Slope" (비탈진 음지, 1973)≫
- ≪"Age of Geocentrism" (천동설 시대, 1974)≫
- ≪"Foreign Land" (이방지대, 1975)≫
- ≪"Oh Almighty" (오 하느님)≫
- ≪"Fireworks" (불놀이)≫

== Awards ==
- Contemporary Literature Prize (1981)
- Republic of Korea Literature Prize (1982)
- Seongok Literature Prize (1988)
- Dongguk Literature Prize (1989)
- City of Kwangju Arts Award (2001)
- Manhae Prize (2003)
