= Kim Sagwa =

South Korean writer (born 1984)

- Born: 1984 (age 41–42)
- Citizenship: South Korean
- Writing career
- Language: Korean
- Notable works: "It's One of Those the More-I'm-in-Motion-the-Weirder-it-Gets Days and It's Really Blowing My Mind"

Korean name
- Hangul: 김사과
- RR: Gim Sagwa
- MR: Kim Sagwa

Kim Sagwa (Korean: 김사과; born 1984) is a South Korean writer.

== Life ==
Kim Sagwa (the name is a pen name and means "apple" or "apology" in Korean) was born in 1984 in Seoul, South Korea, where she attended the Korean National University while studying Creative Writing. She graduated in 2009 after studying under mentors including Kim Young-ha (Your Empire is Calling You, The Photoshop Murder, Black Flower, etc.). By graduation she had already been honored with the 8th Creation and Criticism New Writers Award for her story "02", received a grant from the Korean Culture and Arts Foundation (Seoul), and published her first two novels, Mina (Mina, 2008) and P'ur i numnŭnda (The Grass Is Lying Down, 2009).

In addition to her fiction, Kim also writes columns in two Seoul newspapers, interviewed novelist Douglas Kennedy for Singles Magazine (South Korea), and was the co-translator into Korean of John Freeman's 2012 book How to Read a Novelist.

Kim has lived internationally in the recent past including stints in the City of New York and in 2016 was given a U.S. visa as an O-1 Alien of Extraordinary Ability in the Arts, granting her a three-year residency.

== Career ==
Her first story was titled "02" (Yong’i) and for this work she was given the Changbi New Writer's Prize, by the Ch'angjak kwa pip'yong publishing house. She has also written several other books including Mina (Mina, 2008), P’ul i numnunda (P’ul lies down, 2009), and T’ero ui shi (The Poetry of Terror, 2012). Kim is also the author of a book for young adults entitled, Na b Ch'aek (B and Chaek and Me, 2011). In total she has written four novels and two short story collections. In 2016 "It's One of Those the More-I’m-in-Motion-the-Weirder-it-Gets Days and It’s Really Blowing My Mind" became her first work published in English in the collection The Future of Silence: Fiction by Korean Women. This work was first published in Korean in Spring of 2010 by in the journal, Consonant and Vowel, and was placed on the short list for the Young Writer's Prize, given my Munhak Dongne Publishers. Kim has been compared to Jack Kerouac. According to Bruce and Ju-Chan Fulton (Her English translators), Kim is "attuned to the pathology of life in Seoul, reflected in the national abnormally low birth rate and unusually high rates if divorce and suicide. "It's One of Those the More-I'm-in-Motion-the-Weirder-it-Gets Days and It's Really Blowing My Mind" is one of the rare Korean works to explicitly confront psychosis and count a mental breakdown as the reason for a homicide." It has also been called "brutal .., but nonetheless excellent reading.".

== Bibliography ==
=== Works in translation ===
- "It's One of Those the More-I'm-in-Motion-the-Weirder-it-Gets Days and It's Really Blowing My Mind" in The Future of Silence: Fiction by Korean Women, trans. Bruce and Ju-Chan Fulton
- "SF", trans. Bruce and Ju-Chan Fulton, Azalea: Journal of Korean Literature & Culture 7 (2014).
- Mina (Two Lines Press, 2018), translated by Bruce and Ju-Chan Fulton ISBN 9781931883740
- B, Book, and me (Two Lines Press, 2020), translated by Sunny Jeong ISBN 9781931883962

=== Works in Korean (partial) ===
Short Stories

- 02 (Yong’i)

Novel Length

- In heaven (천국에서; Ch'ŏn'gugesŏ; 2013) ISBN 9788936434069
- Mina (미나; Mina; 2008) ISBN 9788936433611
- The grass lies down (풀이 눕는다; P'uri numnŭnda; 2009) ISBN 9788954609456
- The Poetry of Terror (테러의 시; T'erŏŭi si; 2012) ISBN 9788937484360
- B and Chaek and Me (나b책; Na b ch'aek; 2011) ISBN 9788936456399

== Awards ==
- Changbi New Writer's Prize
