= Yoon Dae-nyeong =

South Korean writer (born 1962)

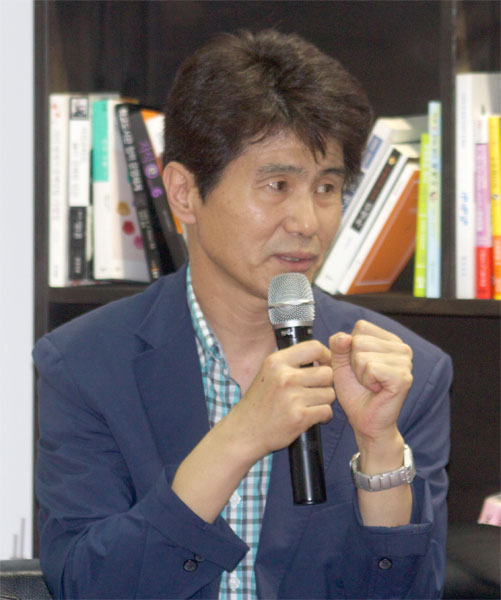
- Born: May 1, 1962 (age 64)
- Education: Dankook University
- Occupation: Novelist
- Writing career
- Language: Korean
- Years active: 1962-present

Korean name
- Hangul: 윤대녕
- Hanja: 尹大寧
- RR: Yun Daenyeong
- MR: Yun Taenyŏng

Yoon Dae-nyeong (Korean: 윤대녕; born 1962) is a South Korean writer.

== Life ==
Yoon Dae-nyeong was born in 1962 in Yesan, South Chungcheong Province. He graduated from Dankook University with a degree in French Language and Literature. He admitted, however, that in his college days he attended more Korean literature classes than French ones. His early boyhood was spent with his grandparents before he joined his parents at the age of eight. Yoon's family was semi-nomadic and he lived in a variety of places, but always in poverty. His habit of reading seems to have been established very early and by the time he attended junior high school, he devoured all the books that he could find around him.

Yoon wrote his first story as a senior high school student. During that year he continued writing, and was eager to win the entry prize at spring literary contests. In 1988, while he was a senior, his novel, A Circle, won the second best award at the spring literary contest sponsored by Daejeon Ilbo.

== Work ==
Yoon's first short story, Circle (Won), was published in Daejeon News (Daejeon Ilbo) in 1988 and republished in Monthly Literature & Thought (문학사상) in 1990. With his following works, My Mother’s Forest (Eomma ui sup), Sweetfish Memorandum (은어銀魚 낚시 통신通信 Euno naksi tongsin, aka Silverfish Memorandum), A Memorandum: Miari, 9 January 1993 (1/9/93 미아리 통신 Miari tongsin), and Once in a While, a Cow Visits a Motel (Soneun yeogwan euro deuleo onda gakkeum), Yoon Daenyeong established a reputation as a writer who captures the ethos and sensibilities of Korean people during the 1990s.

Yoon Dae-nyeong made his major literary debut in 1990 as the winner of the New Writer Award from the monthly Monthly Literature & Thought (문학사상). This was the first of many awards including Today's Young Artist Award (1994), Yi Sang Literary Award (1996), Modern Literature Prize (1998), and Yi Hyo-seok Literary Award (2003). Yun has written extensively: short story collections Sweetfish Fishing Reports, Behold the Southern Stairs, Many Stars Drifted to One Place, and There Walks Someone; and essay collections including; Things I Want to Tell Her and Mother’s Spoon and Chopsticks; and novels I Went to See an Old Movie, Miran - A Traveler in the Snow, Between Heaven and Earth, and Why Did the Tiger Go to the Sea?

== Works in Translation ==
- Between Heaven and Earth, trans. by Kim Sul Ja
- The Sweetfish Memorandum (은어銀魚 낚시 통신通信 Euno naksi tongsin), trans. by Young-Jun Lee
- Mi-ran - A Traveler in the Snow (미란 美兰)
- Voleur d'œufs (사슴벌레 여자)

== Works in Korean (Partial) ==
Short Story Collections

- The Sweetfish Memorandum (1994)
- Behold the Southern Stairs
- Many Stars Drifted to One Place (1999)
- There Walks Someone (2004)

Essay Collections

- Things I Want to Tell Her
- Mother’s Spoon and Chopsticks

Novels

- I Went to See an Old Movie (1997)
- Mi-ran, A Traveler in the Snow (2003)
- Between Heaven and Earth
- Why Did the Tiger Go to the Sea?

== Awards ==
- Spring literary contest sponsored by Daejeon ilbo (1988)
- Monthly Literature & Thought (문학사상) New Writer's Prize (1990)
- Today's Young Artist Award (1994)
- Yi Sang Literature Award (1996)
- Contemporary Literature (Hyundae Munhak) Award (1998)
- Yi Hyo-seok Literary Award (2003)
