= Choe Yun =

South Korean writer (born 1953)

Choe Hyeon-mu
- Born: July 3, 1953 (age 73)
- Occupation: Novelist
- Writing career
- Pen name: Choe Yun
- Period: 1992–present

Korean name
- Hangul: 최현무
- Hanja: 崔賢茂
- RR: Choe Hyeonmu
- MR: Ch'oe Hyŏnmu

Pen name
- Hangul: 최윤
- Hanja: 崔允
- RR: Choe Yun
- MR: Ch'oe Yun

Choe Hyeon-mu (Korean: 최현무; born 1953), better known by her pen name Choe Yun (최윤), is a South Korean writer, translator, and professor of French literature.

== Life ==
Choe was born in Seoul in 1953. She received her Ph.D. from Sogang University, graduating in 1978 and travelling to France, where she received the doctorate de 3ème Cycle de l'Université de Provence D.E.A. in Aix-en-Provence and Marseille. She made her literary debut at the relatively late age of 40, with the publication of the short story collection There a Petal Silently Falls. After her debut, however, Choe was quickly recognized as one of the most important authors in modern South Korea.

== Career ==
Choe Yun's writing merges the psychological impact of political/historical events, including the Gwangju Massacre (1980) and the dictatorship of Park Chung Hee (1961–1979), with fictional techniques.

Choe's works are varied, but typically founded in particular political contexts. The Gray Snowman is told by a young woman on the edges of the 1980s’ dissident movement, and Father’s Surveillance and A Voiceless Window show the pain of families split by the Korean War and the sundering of the nation. Choe, however, keeps her lens firmly fixed on the interior lives of her characters, even as they are stuck in the larger web of history. Choe's narrative style, following the twisted inner world of her characters, is often non-realist. Choe frequently uses memory as one of her themes. Many of her works, including There a Petal Silently Falls (1988), Grey Snowman (1991), and Whisper, Whisper (1993), are semi-autobiographical depictions of the events surrounding the Gwangju Uprising. Her work The Last of Hanako (1994) won the Yi Sang Literary Award.

Choe's work typically addresses the psychological damage created in post-World War II (and particularly post-Korean War) Korea. Choe is notable as one of the first novelists to focus on the impact gender roles have had in modern Korean literature.

== Works ==
=== Works in translation ===
- There a Petal Silently Falls: Three Stories by Ch'oe Yun (Columbia University Press, 2008), translated by Bruce Fulton and Ju-Chan Fulton ISBN 0-231-14296-X
- The Last of Hanako (Jimoondang Publishing, 2003)
- "His Father's Keeper" in Korea Journal Vol.32 No.2 Summer 1992 pp. 117~134

=== Works in Korean (partial) ===
- You Are No Longer You (너는 더 이상 너가 아니다, 1991)
- Whisper, Whisper (속삭임 속삭임, 1991)
- Grey Snowman (회색 눈사람, 1992)
- There a Petal Falls in Silence (저기 소리없이 한 점 꽃잎이 지고, 1992)
- There Is No Hanako (하나코는 없다, 1994)
- Winter, Atlantis (겨울 아틀란티스, 1997)
- Mannequin (마네킹, 2003)

=== Translations ===
(with Patrick Maurus unless otherwise specified)

- La Place (광장, 1994) by Choi In-hoon
- Le Poète by Yi Munyeol
- Le fils de l'homme by Yi Munyeol
- L'autre côté d'un souvenir obscur by Yi Gyun-yeong
- Le prophète by Yi Cheong-jun
- Blessures d'avril by Yi Eoryeong

== Awards ==
- Dong-in Literary Award (1992) - for Gray Snowman
- Yi Sang Literary Award (1994) - for The Last of Hanako
