= Jung Mikyung =

South Korean novelist (1960–2017)

Jung Mi-Kyung
- Born: 4 February 1960; Masan, South Gyeongsang Province, South Korea
- Died: 18 January 2017 (aged 56); Hallym Univ. Sacred Heart Hospital, Anyang, Gyeonggi Province, South Korea
- Citizenship: South Korean
- Occupation: Novelist
- Writing career
- Language: Korean

Korean name
- Hangul: 정미경
- Hanja: 鄭美景
- RR: Jeong Migyeong
- MR: Chŏng Migyŏng

Jung Mi-Kyung (Korean: 정미경; 4 February 1960 – 18 January 2017) was a modern South Korean novelist.

== Life ==
Jung Mi-Kyung was born on February 4, 1960, in Masan, South Gyeongsang Province, South Korea. Jung graduated from Ewha Womans University with a degree in English literature and in 1987 made her literary debut by winning the drama category of the JoongAng Literary Award. After this, however, she withdrew from literary work for over a decade, re-entering the scene as a novelist, debuting with the short story "The Woman With Arsenic" in the Fall volume of World Literature. Thereafter, she has concentrated on her literary career with great success.

== Work ==
Korean critic Kim Kyung-Yeon has referred to Jung's work as, "(portraying) a deceptive society full of absurd spectacles, where truth and falseness are intertwined, appearances define nature, and values are destroyed. She shows us the dark side of post-capitalist society through those who struggle to live amidst these absurd spectacles.

== Selected works ==
=== Works in translation ===
- He Gave Me Roses of the Balkans (translated by Stella Kim)
- My Son's Girlfriend (translated by Yu Young-nan)

=== Works in Korean ===
==== Short stories ====
- "Heavy Snow" (폭설)
- "The Woman with Arsenic" (비소여인, 2001)
- "Divide, the Night" (밤이여, 나뉘어라, 2006)

==== Novels ====
- La Vie en Rose (장밋빛 인생, 2002)
- The Strange Sorrow of Wonderland (이상한 슬픔의 원더랜드, 2005)
- Stars of Africa (아프리카의 별, 2010)

==== Short story collections ====
- Bloodstained Lover (나의 피투성이 연인, 2004)
- They Gave Me Balkan Roses (발칸의 장미를 내게 주었네, 2006)
- My Son's Girlfriend (내 아들의 연인, 2008)
- French Laundry (프랑스식 세탁소, 2013)

== Awards ==
- Yi Sang Literature Award (2006) - for "Divide, the Night" (밤이여, 나뉘어라)
- Today's Artist Award (2002)
