= Choi Jin-young (writer) =

South Korean writer (born 1981)

Choi Jin Young (Hangul 최진영; born 1981) is a South Korean writer. She writes primarily about the contradictions of Korean society and its restless youths who have no sense of purpose in their lives. Choi exposes social problems using simple and clear language. She describes her work and writing process as follows:

“I deal with heavy themes and my narrative voice is fairly intense as well. So I pay careful attention to crafting sentences that are as easy to understand as possible. I’d like readers to breeze through my books, then take some time to think about their themes. I don’t want them to spend too long struggling with complicated sentences. I’d rather they spend that time contemplating the stories themselves. When I write, I try to write a novel that my mother can read. That helps me write concisely and cleanly. I focus on writing something that wouldn’t be too difficult to read for even an elderly audience.”

== Life ==
Choi Jin Young was born in 1981. She studied Korean literature at Duksung Women's University and wrote poetry during her time there. After graduating, she began writing fiction while working part-time as an instructor at a cram school. She taught Korean literature to middle school students during the day and wrote stories at night. Choi says she took up writing purely for her own satisfaction and comfort, and calls her early work “kitchen-table fiction,” a term sometimes used, notably by writers Haruki Murakami and Kim Yeonsu, to refer to fiction written by non-professional writers at the kitchen table after coming home from their day jobs. A short story she wrote at the time received the New Writer's Award presented by the quarterly literary journal Literature and Practice in 2006, which marks her official literary debut. She decided to try writing a full-length novel before it was too late, and after three failed attempts, she won the Hankyoreh Literary Award in 2010 for Dangsin yeopeul seucheogan geu sonyeoui ireumeun (당신 옆을 스쳐간 그 소녀의 이름은 The Name of the Girl Who Brushed Against You Is...).

According to an interview, Choi treats writing like an office job. She wakes up at eight in the morning and writes during regular business hours. After “clocking out,” she reads or watches movies in the evening. Averse to socializing, she spends most of her time in her room or goes on walks alone. In university she had few friends, preferring to haunt the school library instead. She claims that she does not have any close colleagues with whom she exchanges manuscripts and shares feedback. She has received no formal training on creative writing and learned solely from reading books by her favorite authors, such as Lee Mun Ku, Jeon Sungtae, Franz Kafka, and Cormac McCarthy.

== Writing ==
On Paengi (팽이 The Top), Choi Jin Young's first short story collection dealing with various themes, literary critic Gang Gyeong-seok writes:

While Dongabang (돈가방 Briefcase of Cash) and Chang (창 Window) both lead their protagonists down the path to violence, Eli (엘리 Elly), Cheotsarang (첫사랑 First Love), and Paengi (팽이 The Top) follow the awakening and growth of their characters. Eodijjeum (어디쯤 Whereabouts) and Woldeubil 401-ho (월드빌 401호 Worldville Unit 401) portray the world as an exitless catastrophe and explore the full spectrum of the relativization or denial of fate. This is what distinguishes Choi Jin Young from her contemporaries. Rather than simply observing the encroaching sense of "apprehension, resentment, guilt, or shame" that fate has forced on us, Choi captures the point at which we reach our limits and explode, and zeroes in on the vital energy we have left in us even when we hit this dead end.”

As Gang Gyeong-seok points out, Choi’s characters—ranging from low-income earners and contract workers to women, jobless youths, and teens—not only embody the world of pain and poverty they live in, but also channel their pent-up anxiety and despair into an explosive energy that fuels life itself.

Jeon Sungtae, a South Korean writer whom Choi has named as one of her favorite authors, discusses her writing style:

If Choi Jin Young’s two novels proved her to be a potent storyteller, Paengi proves she is equally well-versed in the aesthetic of the short story. Her works have a vicious yet heartbreaking beauty. Sometimes they are tongue-in-cheek, at other times downright miserable. She crafts fast-paced and straightforward narratives. The best part about Choi’s works is her writing style. Her narrators, despite their forthright voice, never sit facing forward. Instead they sit at an angle and spin merry or gloomy tales. It is from this angle that Choi confronts the world. The angle also gives her a distinctive voice. I can’t think of very many writers from her generation who have such an unflinching and profound view of life as she does. Anything she writes makes my mouth water now. In addition to having an excellent command of the language and sensibilities of her generation, she is a rising artist who has carved out a unique path forward. Quite a few young readers have expressed their pride that they will be able to grow old together with such a novelist. For my part, I’ve started collecting her books and left enough space in my bookcase for future works.

== Works ==
- 『구의 증명』, 은행나무, 2015, ISBN 9788956608556 { Proof of Gu. EunHaengNaMu, 2015. }
- 『나는 왜 죽지 않았는가』, 실천문학사, 2013. { Why Didn't I Die? Silcheon Munhak, 2013. }
- 『팽이』, 창비, 2013 ISBN 9788936437275 { The Top. Changbi, 2013. }
- 『끝나지 않는 노래『, 한겨레출판사, 2011. { Unfinished Song. Hanibook, 2011. }
- 『당신 옆을 스쳐간 그 소녀의 이름은』, 한겨레출판사, 2010. { The Name of the Girl Who Brushed Against You Is…. Hanibook, 2010. }
- 『단 한 사람』, 한겨레출판사, 2023. ( Just One Person. Hanibook, 2023).
- 해가 지는 곳으로 (2017)

== Awards ==
- 2014: Sin Dong-yup Prize for Literature
- 2010: The Hankyoreh Literary Award
- 2006: Literature and Practice Award for New Writers
