= Cho Sung-ki =

South Korean writer (born 1951)

- Born: 1951 (age 74–75)
- Writing career
- Language: Korean

- Korean name
- Hangul: 조성기
- Hanja: 趙星基
- RR: Jo Seonggi
- MR: Cho Sŏnggi

Cho Sung-ki (Korean: 조성기; born 1951) is a South Korean writer.

== Life ==
Cho Sung-ki was born March 30, 1951, in Goseong, Gyeongsangnam-do, South Korea. He attended Busan Middle School and Gyeonggi High School where he put himself through a strenuous self-training period reading nearly a thousand pieces of fiction, literary criticism and poetry while teaching himself grammar by hand-copying an entire grammar book. Cho also struggled with his sexual urges and found some refuge in religion. Cho entered Seoul National University and graduated with a degree in law. He also received a graduate degree from Presbyterian Divinity School. He made his literary debut in 1971, winning the New Spring Literary Contest sponsored by The Dong-a Ilbo with a short story called “Kaleidoscope” (Manhwagyeong), but remained virtually silent for the next fourteen years.

== Work ==
Cho's literature, both novels and short stories, focus on the revelation of shameful personal aspects, a feature of his work that is interesting because his works also have an autobiographical nature. Cho made his literary debut in 1971, winning the New Spring Literary Contest sponsored by The Dong-a Ilbo with a short story called “Kaleidoscope” (Manhwagyeong), but remained virtually silent for the next fourteen years. In 1985, he broke this silence with “Lahateuhaherep” and the work received the year's Today's Writer Prize. Since then, Cho Seonggi's literary output has been steady. He has received 1986 Christian Cultural Prize for The Night of Yahweh (Yahweui bam), and 1991 Lee Sang Literature Prize for “A Fiction-Writer in Our Time” (Uri sidaeui soseolga).

What underlies much of Cho's diverse fictional works is the sense of human life as confined. This confinement may take shape of political oppression as in "Buril Waterfall" (Buril pokpo), or cultural violence as in "A Shaman in Our Time" (Uri sidaeui mudang). Then again, one might be ensnared in one's own web of ambition; the novel A Crow's Eye View of Desire develops this theme using a sustained allusion to Lee Sang's famed series of poems. The novel, however, also offers a release from the confinement that is the fundamental condition of existence through violent outbursts of erotic energy. The novel Love in Our Time (Uri sidaeui sarang) also presents eroticism as the vital mechanism for the free release of inner life. Thus, eroticism, as well as humor and the juxtaposition of subjective interpretation and objective facts, are the main techniques Cho uses in his attempts to challenge human confinement.

== Works in Korean (partial) ==
Novels

- Liberty Bell (Jayujong),
- A Nest of Thorns (Gasi dungji),
- A Little Faster, with Sadness (Seulpeundeusi jogeum ppareuge)
- The Land of Baba (Babaui nara),
- The Warring States Period (Jeonguk sidae)
- The Burning Sword of Eden (Edenui bulkal)

Short Stories

- Kings and Dogs (Wanggwa gae)
- Anima, or Strange Confessions About Women (Anima, hogeun yeoja-e gwanhan gieok)
- The Road to Tongdo Temple (Tongdosa ganeun gil).

== Awards ==
- New Spring Literary Contest
- Today's Writer Award (1985)
- Yi Sang Literary Award (1991)
