= Chae Man-sik =

Korean novelist (1902–1950)

- Born: 17 June 1902; Okgu, North Jeolla Province, Korean Empire
- Died: 11 June 1950 (aged 47)
- Citizenship: South Korean
- Writing career
- Language: Korean

- Chae Man-sik
- Hangul: 채만식
- Hanja: 蔡萬植
- RR: Chae Mansik
- MR: Ch'ae Mansik

Art name
- Hangul: 백릉
- Hanja: 白菱
- RR: Baekreung
- MR: Paengnŭng

Chae Man-sik or Ch'ae Mansik (Korean: 채만식, June 17, 1902 – June 11, 1950) was a Korean novelist known for his satirical bent.

== Biography ==
Chae Man-sik was born in Okgu (now Gunsan), North Jeolla Province, South Korea, to a family of the Pyeonggang Chae clan. He graduated from Choongang High School and attended Waseda University in Tokyo, Japan. He worked as a reporter for the publications Dong-a Ilbo, Chosun Ilbo, and Gaebyeok, as well as working as an editor for the Gaebyeok Publishing Company's many magazines, including Hyeseong (Comet) and Jeilseon (제일선, Frontline). Chae Man-sik entered the literary scene with the publication of his short story "Toward the Three Paths" (세길로, 1924). He first gained critical attention ten years later with the publication of the short story "A Ready-Made Life" (레디메이드 인생, 1934). In 1936 he moved to Kaesong (now in North Korea) to devote himself solely to creative writing.

== Career ==
After publishing his first short story, "Toward the Three Paths" (세길로, 1924) in the magazine Joseon Literary World, Chae Man-sik's literary career began. His early stories and plays were written from a class-sensitive perspective, and, with the publication of "A Ready-Made Life" (레디메이드 인생, 1934), he began to focus his attention specifically on the plight of intellectuals and artists during an era of colonial oppression, which he expanded upon in later works such as "An Intellectual and Mung-Bean Cake" (인텔리와 빈대떡) and "My Innocent Uncle" (치숙, 1938).

Having been arrested by the Japanese colonial government in 1938 as a result of his affiliation with the Society for Reading (독서회), Chae Man-sik was released on the condition that he participate in a pro-Japanese literary organization, the Korean Literary Society for Patriotism. Chae complied, writing a handful of pro-Japanese works as a result, including a celebratory account of what he had observed when visiting the Japanese Army's Manchurian Front in December 1942. After Korea's liberation from Japanese colonial rule, however, Chae Man-sik openly reproached the pro-Japanese actions of Korean intellectuals at the end of the colonial period, his own included, by writing such works as Sinner Against the Nation (민족의 죄인) and "The Path of History" (영노, 1946).

Until his death in 1950 (shortly before the outbreak of the Korean War), Chae Man-sik continued to produce satires of contemporary society in post-liberation Korea. The short stories "Constable Maeng" (맹순사, 1946) and "Story of a Rice Paddy" (논 이야기) are particularly noteworthy in this regard, focusing on the turbulence and confusion of a society embarking upon the difficult process of rebuilding a nation. He published over 290 works in total throughout his life, including novels, short stories, essays, plays, and reviews.

Chae Man-sik's collected works were published in 1989 in the quarterly magazine Creation and Criticism (창작과비평사) by the publishing house Changbi (formerly known as Creation and Criticism until 2003).

== Works ==
=== Works in Korean (partial) ===
- "Toward the Three Paths" (세길로, sometimes written as 새길로, 1924)
- "Disappearing Shadows" (사라지는 그림자, 1931)
- Leaving the Doll's House (인형의 집을 나와서, 1933)
- "Ready-Made Life" (레디메이드 인생, 1934)
- The Muddy Current (탁류(濁流), 1937)
- Peace Under Heaven (천하태평춘, 1938)
- "My Idiot Uncle" (치숙(痴叔), 1938)
- "Cuckoo" (쑥국새, 1938)
- The Passion of Gold (금(金)의 정열, 1939)
- "The Loser's Tomb" (패배자의 무덤, 1939)
- Frozen Fish (냉동어(冷凍魚), 1940)
- "The Path of History" (영노, 1946)
- "Constable Maeng" (맹순사, 1946)
- "Mister Bang" (미스터 방(方), 1946)
- Sinner Against the Nation (민족의 죄인, 1948)
- "Wife and Children" (처자, 1948)

=== Works in Translation ===
- Peace Under Heaven: A Modern Korean Novel (Routledge, 1993), translated by Chun Kyung-Ja ISBN 978-1-563-24112-3
- "The Wife and Children" in Land of Exile: Contemporary Korean Fiction (Routledge, 1993, 2007 - expanded edition), ed. Marshall R. Pihl, Bruce Fulton, Ju-Chan Fulton ISBN 978-0-765-61810-8
- "My Idiot Uncle" in The Rainy Spell and Other Korean Stories (Routledge, 1997), edited and translated by Seo Jimun (Suh Ji-moon) ISBN 978-0-765-60138-4
- "A Ready-Made Life" in A Ready-Made Life: Early Masters of Modern Korean Fiction (University of Hawaiʻi Press, 1998), ed. Bruce Fulton and Kim Chong-un ISBN 978-0-824-82071-8
- "My Innocent Uncle" in My Innocent Uncle (Jimoondang(지문당), 2003), translated by Bruce Fulton, Ju-Chan Fulton, Kim Chong-un, and Robert Armstrong ISBN 978-8-988-09565-2
- "My Innocent Uncle" in Modern Korean Fiction: An Anthology (Columbia University Press, 2005), ed. Bruce Fulton and Kwon Youngmin ISBN 978-0-231-13513-9
- "Constable Maeng" in Waxen Wings: The ACTA Koreana Anthology of Short Fiction from Korea (Koryo Press, 2011), ed. Bruce Fulton, translated by Joel Stevenson ISBN 978-1-597-43203-0
- Transgressor of the Nation (Literature Translation Institute of Korea, 2013), translated by Jane Kim ISBN 978-8-993-36028-8
- Frozen Fish (Literature Translation Institute of Korea, 2013), translated by Myles Ji ISBN 978-8-993-36015-8
- The Cuckoo (Literature Translation Institute of Korea, 2013), translated by Jamie Chang ISBN 978-8-993-36069-1
- "Mister Pang" in Rat Fire: Korean Stories from the Japanese Empire (Cornell University Press, 2013), ed. Theodore Hughes ISBN 978-1-933-94787-7
- Three Paths (Literature Translation Institute of Korea, 2014), translated by Jamie Chang ISBN 978-8-993-36057-8
- Juvesenility (ASIA Publishers, 2015), translated by Bruce Fulton and Ju-Chan Fulton ISBN 979-1-156-62078-5
- Turbid River (Dalkey Archive Press, 2016), translated by Chung-Hee Kim ISBN 978-1-628-97149-1
- Sunset: A Ch'ae Manshik Reader (Columbia University Press, 2017), translated by Bruce Fulton and Ju-Chan Fulton ISBN 978-0-231-18101-3
