= There a Petal Silently Falls =

There a Petal Silently Falls: Three Stories is a collection of stories by Choe Yun, published by Columbia University Press in 2008. Bruce Fulton and Ju-Chan Fulton did the English translations from the original Korean. It is about victims of state sanctioned violence against women. It remains Choe Yun's best known work.

The collection is named after the work "There a Petal Silently Falls" (저기 소리없이 한 점 꽃잎이 지고), which is about the Gwangju Uprising, and is Ch'oe Yun's first published work. It also includes "Whisper Yet," about two people of different political orientations becoming friends, and "The Thirteen-Scent Flower", about people trying to make a new kind of flower. Youngju Ryu of the University of Michigan argued that the third story would be more literally, from the Korean, called "The Flower Scent with Thirteen Names."

== Reception ==
Joanna Elfving-Hwang of the University of Sheffield stated that the translations worked as they focused on "readability" although some "richness" was lost, and she described the "Thirteen-Scent Flower" as an "excellent introduction" to Choe Yun's writings.

Ray Olson of Booklist gave the collection a starred review.

Ryu gave an overall positive reception to the book and argued that it would be useful for people studying Korea and/or trauma, and he also gave an overall positive reception to the translation. Although Ryu had found it had "many charms", he argued that the third story was "ultimately distracting" in the scheme of the collection.

Korean Literature in Translation reviewed the book and said, " it is a stunningly good book, albeit not a cheery one." It goes on to note that the book was one of the first attempts in literature to confront the outrage of the Gwangju Massacre. They further note the book impacted Koran Literature by encouraging contemporaries to make a shift towards experimental and postmodern styles.

In Project MUSE, the book was reviewed as a vivid window into the life of a traumatized teen orphaned by a conflict and her vain efforts to deal with the enormity of the situation. The author's style is called versatile and contemporary while drawing from her strong academic background in French Literature.

The Journal of Asian Studies from Duke University Press notes that the book challenged censorship when denial was prevalent.

Tony's Reading List called it excellently written, an allegory picking at open wounds and about a shell shocked refugee wandering.
