= Im Cheolu =

South Korean writer (born 1954)

Lim Chul-woo
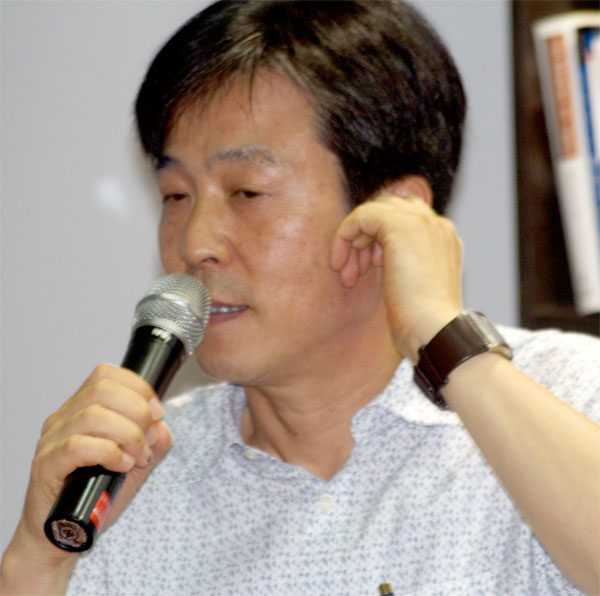
- Lim at SIBF 2014
- Born: October 15, 1954 (age 71); Wando, Wando County, South Jeolla Province, South Korea
- Writing career
- Language: Korean

Korean name
- Hangul: 임철우
- RR: Im Cheolu
- MR: Im Ch'ŏru

Lim Chul-Woo (Korean: 임철우; born 1954) is a South Korean writer, known for his subversive works.

== Life ==
Im Chul-woo was born October 15, 1954, on Wando Island in South Jeolla Province. He moved to Gwangju at age 10 and attended Sung-il High School there. He graduated from Jeonnam University with a degree in English Literature and completed graduate programs in English Literature at both Sogang University and Jeonnam University. Presently, he teaches Creative Writing at Hanshin University. Im was in Gwangju during the Gwangju Uprising and this critically influenced his outlook. His work has centered around dramatizations of that event and works which more generally focus on issues of Korean separation.

His debut was The Dog Thief in 1981 In 1985 he was awarded the 17th Korean Creative Writing Prize for The Land of My Father (Abeoji ui ttang) and in 1988 was awarded the 12th Yi Sang Literature Prize for The Red Room (Bulgeun bang), which has since been published in an anthology of the same name.

In 1994 Im's novel, I Want to Go to the Island was made into a Korean movie, To the Starry Island.

== Work ==
Lim Chul-Woo is known as a subversive author. One year after the Gwangju Uprising Lim published his first short story, Dog Thief, which focused on the national division and violence of Korean ideological conflict. Most of LIm's writing focuses on the Gwangju Uprising of the Korean War as a setting in which to explore the psychology of guilt. Lim's work on the Gwangju Uprising culminated in Spring Day, a five-volume novel written over eight years.

== Works in English ==
- My Father's Land (in The Star and Other Korean Short Stories)
- The Red Room (in Red Room)
- Straight Lines and Poison Gas - At the Hospital Wards (2013)
- The Island

== Works in Korean (Partial) ==
- I Want to Go to the Island
- Red Mountain, White Bird
- Spring Day

== Awards ==
- 17th Korean Creative Writing Prize for "The Land of My Father" (Abeoji ui ttang, 1985)
- 12th Yi Sang Literary Award for "The Red Room" (Bulgeun bang, 1988).
