= Park Hyoung-su =

South Korean writer

- Born: August 11, 1972 (age 54)
- Education: Korea University - Ph.D.
- Writing career
- Language: Korean
- Period: Modern
- Notable work: Arpan

Korean name
- Hangul: 박형서
- Hanja: 朴馨瑞
- RR: Bak Hyeongseo
- MR: Pak Hyŏngsŏ

Park Hyoung-su (born August 11, 1972) is a male South Korean writer of fiction born in Chuncheon, Gangwan-do, South Korea. His short story "Krabi," named after the Thai district, has been published in a bilingual edition in France.

== Life ==
Park was born in Chuncheon, Gangwon Province, South Korea in 1972. He graduated from Korea University graduate school, with a Ph.D. in 2010 from Korea University Graduate School with a Masters in 2003, and from Hanyang University, a Bachelor of Korean literature in 1999. Park made his literary debut in 2000 through the Hyundae Munhak. He currently teaches creative writing at Korea University.

== Work ==
Park is an unusual novelist for a Korean, often placing his works outside of Korea, or finding their genesis outside of Korea. and Korean critics have had a difficult time pigeonholing him, various describing him as a "storyteller", "metamorphic", and "self-aware", among other terms. LIST Magazine has summarized Park's role as a modern novelist: "The novel as a modern invention is what many young Korean writers are pondering as they attempt to redefine the landscape of modern Korean literature. Out of these writers, Park Hyoung-su stands out for the perception, intelligence, and playful imagination so evident in his work. At the moment, his only work translated into English is Arpan (ASIA Publishers) which has been well reviewed at www.ktlit.com as "another shock to a habitual reader of Korean literature in translation as it treads overseas as well as into cultural relativism, and the position of plagiarism/copying in Korea".

== Awards ==
- 2016: The 10th Kim you jeong literary Award
- 2012: Today's Young Artist Award
- 2010: The 18th annual Daesan literary fiction Award

== Works in English ==
- Arpan (Asia Publishers, 2014)

== Works in Korean ==
- 뺨에 묻은 보석 마음산책 2021. 06. 10
- 여기 우리 마주 (2021 현대문학상 소설집) 현대문학 2021
- 마음의 부력 (2021 이상문학상 작품집) 문학사상사 2021
- 낭만주의 문학동네 2018. 07. 11
- 당신의 노후 현대문학 2018
- 산책자의 행복 (2016,이효석 문학상 수상작품집) 생각정거장 2016
- 거기 있나요 (2016 김유정문학상 제10회 수상작품집) 은행나무 2016
- 작가와 고양이 폭스코너 2016
- 베를린 필 (2016 제61회 현대문학상 수상소설집) 현대문학 2016
- 끄라비 문학과지성사 2014.05.08
- 빈집 (제12회 황순원 문학상 수상작품집) 문예중앙 2012.10.25
- 핸드메이드 픽션 문학동네 2011.12.05
- 부메랑 (2011 제11회 황순원문학상 수상작품집) 문예중앙 2011.10.20
- 작가가 선정한 오늘의 소설 (2012) 작가 2012.03
- 작가가 선정한 오늘의 소설 (2011) 작가 2011.03.15
- 새벽의 나나 (제18회 대산문학상 수상작) 문학과지성사 2010.05.13
- 사랑을 믿다 (2008년 제32회 이상문학상 작품집) 문학사상사 2008.01.18
- 자정의 픽션 문학과지성사 2006.10.30
- 토끼를 기르기 전에 알아두어야 할 것들 문학과지성사 2003.12.22
