= Kim Yeonsu =

South Korean writer (born 1970)

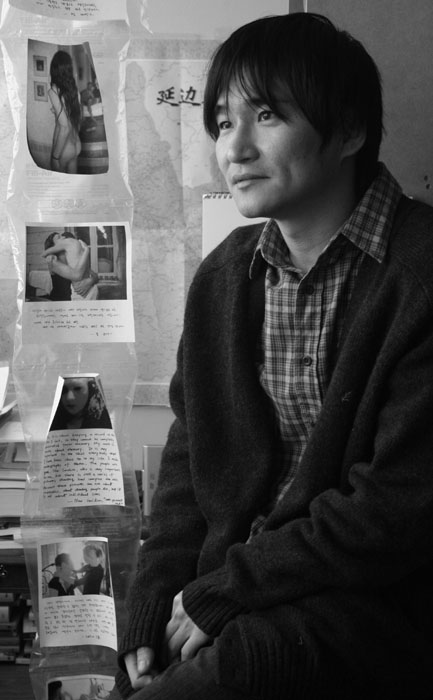
- Kim Yeonsu
- Born: Kim Yeongsu; 1970 (age 55–56); South Korea
- Occupation: Author
- Writing career
- Language: Korean, English
- Period: 1970-Present
- Genre: Modernist

Korean name
- Hangul: 김연수
- Hanja: 金衍洙
- RR: Gim Yeonsu
- MR: Kim Yŏnsu
- Website: www.blossomcreative.co.kr

Kim Yeonsu (The Romanization preferred by the author according to LTI Korea; Korean: 김연수; born 1970) is a South Korean writer.

== Life ==
Kim Yeonsu was born in Kimcheon, Kyeongsangbuk-do in 1970. He graduated with a degree in English literature from Sungkyunkwan University in Korea. After graduation, Kim was an office worker by day, a translator at night, and spent the remainder of his time writing novels. In 1997, Kim worked as a reporter for a woman's magazine, and this experience was also key to his outlook that daily life is difficult.

== Work ==
Kim made his debut in 1993 with a poem in the journal Jakka Segye (Writer's World) and the next year published a novel Walking While Pointing to the Mask (Gamyeon-eul Gariki-myeo Geotgi). He is one of the most well-received Korean writers since 2000, and also a best-selling author in Korea. For example, his work World’s End Girlfriend, published in 2009, sold 40,000 copies in less than three months of publication.

Kim's literary world is shaped by his study of the humanities and at is heavily influenced by the Argentinian writer, Jorge Luis Borges, whose impact is especially evident in his first collection of short stories, Twenty Years Old.

Kim's third novel, Goodbye, Yi Sang acclaimed by critics for its humanistic imagination. Borgesian influence could be noticed in the work, but only in the background. The novel is animated by Kim's in-depth study of Yi Sang, the Korean existentialist writer of the 1930s who produced some of the most exotic and complex stories in Korean literary history. Goodbye, Yi Sang is concerned with the question of truth, and of existence as well as the definition of literature which, in Kim's view, are not mutually exclusive. “The reason why I write,” the author has said, "is to find out whether the truth does indeed exist in the act of writing."

When I Was Still A Child, which first appeared in serial form, is a collection of stories based on his childhood and adolescence. Although it was written with considerable ease and employs much lighter tone of voice than Goodbye, Yi Sang, the stories in this collection provide yet another venue for exploring the nature of truth, which has always remained the focus of Kim's interest.

As a young author, Kim's works are just now being translated. To this date, only one short essay (New York Bakery) and several short stories referenced below have been translated into English. Rather, more of his works are translated into Japanese, French, and Russian. World’s End Girlfriend, Wonder Boy, The Country of the Blind, and other short stories are published in Japanese. So You Love Me, Seonnyeong (Sarang-irani, Seonnyeong-a), If the Waves Belong to the Sea, and I am a Ghost Writer are translated into French. World’s End Girlfriend and Wonder Boy are also published in Russian, I am a Ghost Writer is published in German, and again, World's End Girlfriend in Chinese.

=== Awards ===
First Place

- Dong-seo Literary Award (2001) Goodbye, Yi Sang (꾿빠이, 이상)
- Dong-in Literary Award (2003) When I Was Still A Child (내가 아직 아이였을 때)
- Daesan Literary Award (2005) I am a Ghost Writer (나는 유령작가입니다)
- Hwang Sun-won Literary Award (2007) The Comedian Who Went to the Moon (달로 간 코미디언)
- Yi Sang Literary Prize (2009) Five Pleasures for Those Who Take Walks (산책하는 이들의 다섯 가지 즐거움)

Runner-ups

- Critics' Choices: Novels (2001) First Love (첫사랑)
- Critics' Choices: Novels (2002) Hanging Yellow Lotus Lantern High (노란 연등 드높이 내걸고)
- Yi Sang Literary Prize (2002) First Love (첫사랑)
- Yi Sang Literary Prize (2003) Hanging Yellow Lotus Lantern High (노란 연등 드높이 내걸고)
- Authors' Choices: Novels (2005) Words Cannot Tell (뿌넝쒀)
- Lee Hyo-seok Literary Prize (2007) Happy New Year to Everyone - To Raymond Carver (모두에게 복된 새해)
- Critics' Choices: Novels (2007) Happy New Year to Everyone - To Raymond Carver (모두에게 복된 새해)
- Yi Sang Literary Prize (2007) I Need a Vacation (내겐 휴가가 필요해)
- Authors' Choices: Novels (2008) Happy New Year to Everyone - To Raymond Carver (모두에게 복된 새해)
- Critics' Choices: Novels (2008) Tried Calling KK's Name (케이케이의 이름을 불러봤어)
- Authors' Choices: Novels (2009) Tried Calling KK's Name (케이케이의 이름을 불러봤어)
- Critics' Choices: Novels (2009) World's End Girlfriend (세계의 끝 여자친구)
- Novels Worth Noting (2012) I am In-gu (인구가 나다)
- Contemporary Literature (Hyundae Munhak) Award (2013) What We Can Write in Blue (푸른색으로 우리가 쓸 수 있는 것)
- Contemporary Literature (Hyundae Munhak) Award (2014) Dong-uk (동욱)
- EBS Radio Literature Award (2014) New Year with Cherry Blossoms (벚꽃 새해)
- Lee Hyo-seok Literary Prize (2018) The Night and Mind (그 밤과 마음)
- Contemporary Literature (Hyundae Munhak) Award (2018) A Joseon Poet with a Clouded Face (낯빛 검스룩한 조선 시인)

=== Works in English ===
- Happy New Year to Everyone - To Raymond Carver.
- Whoever You Are, No Matter How Lonely (Free Subscription)
- If the Waves Belong to the Sea
- New York Bakery

=== Works in Korean (Partial) ===
Collections

- 《Twenty Years Old (스무 살)》 (Munhakdongne, 2000)
- 《When I Was Still A Child (내가 아직 아이였을 때)》 (Munhakdongne, 2002)
- 《I am a Ghost Writer (나는 유령작가입니다)》 (Changbi Publishers, 2005)
- 《World's End Girlfriend (세계의 끝 여자친구)》 (Munhakdongne, 2009)
- 《Mi in April, Sol in July (사월의 미, 칠월의 솔)》 (Munhakdongne, 2013)

Long Fiction

- 《Walking While Pointing to the Mask (가면을 가리키며 걷기)》 (Segye-sa, 1994)
- 《Route 7 (7번국도)》 (Munhakdongne, 1997)
- 《Goodbye, Yi Sang (꾿빠이, 이상)》 (Munhakdongne, 2001)
- 《So You Love Me, Seonnyeong (사랑이라니, 선영아)》 (Jakga Jeongsin, 2003)
- 《Whoever You Are, No Matter How Lonely (네가 누구든 얼마나 외롭든)》 (Munhakdongne, 2007)
- 《The Night Sings (밤은 노래한다)》 (Moonji Publishing, 2008)
- 《Route 7 Revisited (7번국도 Revisited)》(Munhakdongne, 2010)
- 《If the Waves Belong to the Sea (파도가 바다의 일이라면)》 (Jaeum-gwa-Moeum, 2012)
- 《Wonder Boy (원더보이)》 (Munhakdongne, 2012)

Essays

- 《Sentences of a Springtime (청춘의 문장들)》 (Maum-sanchaek, 2004)
- 《The Right to Travel (여행할 권리)》 (Changbi Publishers, 2008)
- 김연수, 김중혁 (with Joong-hyuk Kim), 《A Spontaneous Happy-ending (대책 없이 해피엔딩)》 (Cine 21 Books, 2010)
- 《The Moments We Shared: Novels (우리가 보낸 순간: 소설)》 (Maum-sanchaek, 2010)
- 《The Moments We Shared: Poems (우리가 보낸 순간: 시)》 (Maum-sanchaek, 2010)
- 《Saying that I Won't Lose (지지 않는다는 말)》 (Maum-eu-Sup, 2012)
- 《Sentences of a Springtime+ (청춘의 문장들+)》 (Maum-sanchaek, 2014)
- 《The Work of a Novelist (소설가의 일)》 (Munhakdongne, 2014)
- 《Someday, Probably (언젠가, 아마도)》 (Culturegrapher, 2018)

Chapters

- "행복해지거든," "나무들 사이로 바다를 보다," "희망봉에 서서," "나도 웃으니까," "반가워. 내가 네 아빠야!," "시간이 사라진다면," "한바탕 웃을 때마다," "내가 바라는 것," 《사람은 사람을 부른다》 (Daughters of St. Paul, 2013)
- "The River of Love Flows Only Downward (내리 내리 아래로만 흐르는 물인가, 사랑은)," 《Slowly, I started Crying (나는 천천히 울기 시작했다)》 (Bomnal-eu-chaek, 2013)
- "Buddhism is about Thinking with Heart (불교란, 마음을 담아서 보는 것이다)," 《I am Ordained in Literature (나는 문학으로 출가했다)》 (Jogye Book, 2013)
- "So Tell Me Again, Tiresias (그러니 다시 한번 말해보시오, 테이레시아스여)," 《The Country of the Blind (눈먼 자들의 국가)》 (Munhakdongne, 2014)
- "Finding Traces of Exchanges Among Civilizations from Silk Road (실크로드에 남은 문명 교류의 흔적들을 찾아서)," 《Silk Road, Finding a Road on the Road (실크로드, 길 위에서 길을 보다)》 (Human and Books, 2014)
- "A Spring Day that Returns after Meeting the Things that Pass Us by (우리에게 다녀가는 것들을 만나고 돌아온 봄날)," 《The Person Who We Cherished: About Park Wan-suh (우리가 참 아끼던 사람: 소설가 박완서 대담집)》 (Dal, 2016)
- 김연수, 노승영 (with Seung-young Roh), "A Puzzle Called Yeonsu Kim (김연수라는 퍼즐)," 《This is my Axt (이것이 나의 도끼다)》 (EunHaengNaMu, 2017)
- "The 15 Pages that No One in the World Writes For You (이 세상 그 누구도 대신 써주지 않는 15매)," 《Autobiographical Essays of the Yi Sang Literary Prize Winners (이상문학상 대상 작가의 자전적 에세이)》 (Munhaksasang, 2019)
- "Review of The Adventures and Misadventures of Maqroll (마크롤 가비에로의 모험)," 《World Literature Read by Korean Authors (한국 작가가 읽은 세계문학)》 (Munhakdongne, 2018)

Translations

- Roald Dahl, 《George's Marvellous Medicine (조지, 마법의 약을 만들다)》 (Sigong Junior, 2000)
- George A. Sheehan, 《Running & Being: The Total Experience (달리기와 존재하기)》 (Hanmunhwa, 2003)
- Ha Jin, 《Waiting (novel) (기다림)》(Sigongsa, 2007)
- Raymond Carver, 《Cathedral (short story collection) (대성당)》 (Munhakdongne, 2007/2014)
- Barnaby Conrad and Monte Schulz, 《Snoopy's Guide to the Writing Life (스누피의 글쓰기 완전정복)》 (Hanmunhwa, 2012)
- John C. H. Wu, 《The Golden Age of Zen (선의 황금시대)》 (Hanmunhwa, 2013)
- Laurence Yep, 《Dragonwings (용의 날개)》 (Sonyunhangil, 2016)
