= Choi Suchol =

South Korean author (born 1958)

- Born: May 13, 1958 (age 68); Chuncheon
- Citizenship: South Korean
- Education: Seoul National University
- Occupations: writer, educator
- Writing career
- Language: Korean
- Period: 1981-
- Genre: fiction
- Notable work: The Death of an Anarchist(1990)
- Notable awards: Yi Sang Literary Award

- Korean name
- Hangul: 최수철
- RR: Choe Sucheol
- MR: Ch'oe Such'ŏl

Choi Suchol (Korean: 최수철; born May 13, 1958) is a South Korean author.

== Life ==
Choi Suchol was born on May 13, 1958, in Chuncheon, South Korea. After attending Chuncheon High School, Choi received undergraduate and graduate degrees in French Literature from Seoul National University. His doctoral dissertation was on the writings of Michel Butor. He debuted in 1981 by winning the New Spring Literary Contest sponsored by The Chosun Ilbo with his story "Blindspot" (Maengjeom). He has also taught Creative Writing at Hanshin University.

== Work ==
The point of departure for Choi Suchol's fiction is the claim that genuine communication has become impossible in the print culture of the modern age, and he is known for the abstruse quality of his works. This claim forms the basis of his early work, "Tower in the Air" (Gongjung nugak), which features a protagonist who desires but cannot communicate with the world. "A Meditation on Sounds" (Sorie daehan myeongsang), "A Consideration of the Eyes" (Siseon go), and "Body Language" resurrect systems of meaning inscribed onto the physical body itself as possible alternatives to the written language. The search for a means of communication that predates actual language continues in "The Beginning of Story, Record, Fossil" (Hwadu, girok, hwaseok), The Death of an Anarchist (Eoneu mujeongbu juuijaui jugeum), The Mural Painter (Byeokhwa geurineun namja) and "Crucible of Ice" (Eoreumui dogani, 1993). Choi Suchol's method is often clinical; he dissects or lengthens observed phenomena and reconstructs them in a way that deliberately flouts the principle of recognizability. His search for alternative means of communication is predicated on the desire to achieve sympathetic understanding with other beings, a desire he views as being frustrated in the modern world of overdetermined signs.

== Works in Translation ==
- 一个无政府主义者的爱情 (어느 무정부주의자의 사랑)

== Works in Korean (Partial) ==
Short Story Collections

- Tower in the Air (1985)
- Background and Outline (Baegyeonggwa yungwak, 1987)
- The Beginning of a Story
- Record, Fossil (1987)
- Intimate Stories of the Body (Mome daehan eunmilhan iyagideul)

Novels

- Belly of a Whale (Gorae baetsogeseo, 1989)
- The Death of an Anarchist (1990)
- The Mural Painter (1992)

== Awards ==
- Yi Sang Literary Award (1993)
