= Choe Inho =

South Korean writer (1945–2013)

- Born: October 17, 1945; South Korea
- Died: September 25, 2013 (aged 67)
- Education: Yonsei University
- Occupations: Academic; writer
- Writing career
- Language: Korean

Korean name
- Hangul: 최인호
- Hanja: 崔仁浩
- RR: Choe Inho
- MR: Ch'oe Inho

Choe Inho (Korean: 최인호; 17 October 1945 – 25 September 2013) was a South Korean writer.

== Life ==
Born in Seoul, Choe Inho graduated from the Department of English Literature at Yonsei University and debuted as a writer in 1967 with the short story “Patient Apprentice” (Gyeonseup Hwanja, 견습환자), which was selected as one of the winners of the New Spring Literary Contest sponsored by The Chosun Ilbo.

In his youth, Choe was known as a prodigious drinker ("guzzler"), and in 2014 his handprints were memorialized on the sidewalk of Yonsei-ro, where he frequently drank.

In 1987, when he was 43 years old, Choe converted to Catholicism, but nonetheless managed to extend his narrative range to include Buddhism in Road Without Road.

Choe also taught at Yonsei University and Catholic University of Korea. He died September 25, 2013, at age 68 (Korean age) from salivary gland cancer.

== Work ==
Choe Inho began writing in 1963 at age 17 and took to it naturally. This is clear in his own account of writing two stories, “The Boozer” (술꾼) (1970) and “A Stranger’s Room” (타인의 방) (1971), which earned him a reputation as one of the most controversial novelists of the 1970s. According to Choe, “The Boozer” was completed in only two hours, while “A Stranger’s Room” was written overnight for the first issue of Literature and Intelligence.

A handful of his early stories gained notice when they won competitions sponsored by local papers (The Hanguk Ilbo in 1963, the Chosun Ilbo in 1966) and the Sasanggye Magazine (1968). His early stories (Including "The Boozer," widely anthologized in English, which created general awareness of his career in 1970, though written earlier) depicted harsh and satirical landscapes of the results of consumerism. Choe focused on the people caught in the middle of a rapidly industrializing Korea, presenting a satirical picture of burgeoning consumerism and the resultant dehumanization.

In the mid-1970s, Choe generalized his focus to that of alienation and wrote "Deep Blue Night," which told of the harsh and alienated "road trip" of two Koreans in California. It won the prestigious Yi Sang Literary Award in Korea in 1982. It was translated into English by Bruce Fulton and his wife Ju-Chan Fulton for the Literature Translation Institute of Korea and Jimoondang Publishing.

Among his works, The Merchant of Joseon (Sangdo, 상도) and Emperor of The Sea (Haeshin, 해신) were dramatized and aired by MBC and KBS in 2001 and 2004, respectively, which won popularity not only among Koreans but also viewers across the globe.

=== Awards ===
Choe's "Deep Blue Night" won the prestigious Yi Sang Literary Award in Korea in 1982. Besides winning the Yi Sang Literary Award, Choe was also awarded the 1972 Contemporary Literature (Hyundae Munhak) Award.

== Works in translation ==
English

- "Deep Blue Night," Jimoondang Press (May 31, 2008) ISBN 89-88095-62-6
- "Tower of Ants," Hollym International Corporation (December 31, 2004) ISBN 1-56591-202-0
- "The Boozer," Land of Exile ISBN 0-7656-1810-9
- "Another Man's Room," Modern Korean Fiction an Anthology ISBN 0-231-13512-2

German

- Koreanische Literatur Band 3 detail (한국문학 사화집 제3권 -전후 중단편선), Bouvier, translated by Ku Ki-Seong
- Schriftenreihe des Instituts für Koreanische Kultur. 1984/5 detail (<한>誌 (84.5월호) - 한국문학특집호), Institut für Koreanische Kultur
- Schriftenreihe des Instituts für Koreanische Kultur. 1984/7 detail (<한>誌 (84.7월호) - 한국문학특집호), Institut für Koreanische Kultur

Japanese

- 他人の部屋 detail (타인의 방), コールサック (Coal Sack)社
- 夢遊桃源図 detail (몽유도원도), コールサック (Coal Sack)社

Polish

- Maski detail (가면무도회), Nobilitas

French

- Une nuit bleue et profonde (깊고 푸른 밤), Actes Sud
