= O Jeonghui =

South Korean writer (born 1947)

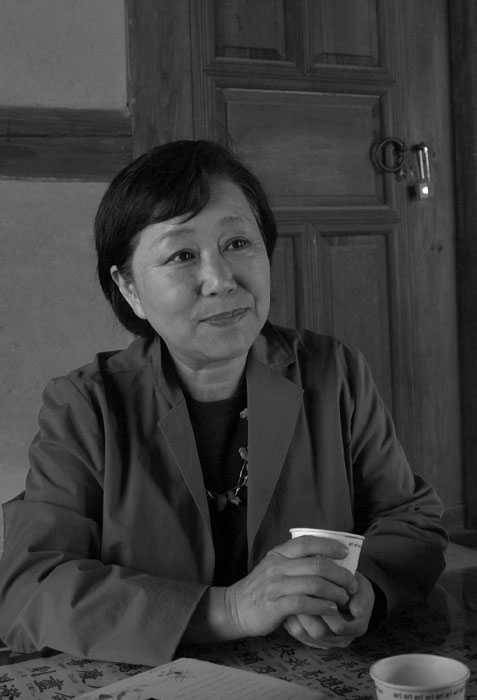
- O Jeonghui in 2004
- Born: November 9, 1947 (age 78); Seoul, South Korea
- Citizenship: South Korean
- Occupation: Writer
- Writing career
- Language: Korean
- Period: 1968-
- Notable awards: Yi Sang Literary Award

Korean name
- Hangul: 오정희
- Hanja: 吳貞姬
- RR: O Jeonghui
- MR: O Chŏnghŭi

O Jeonghui (Korean: 오정희; born November 9, 1947) is a South Korean writer.

== Life ==
O Jeonghui was born in Seoul, South Korea, on November 9, 1947. She attended the Sorabol Art College from which she received her B.A. in creative writing in 1968. O Jeonghui made her initial literary impact while in her final year of college as she was awarded the Chungang Ilbo annual award for aspiring writers. This work was even more remarkable as O Jeonghui began to write it while she was still in high school. The story was "The Toyshop Woman", a dark story about a high-school girl, who is emotionally abandoned by her parents and whose disabled brother dies, setting her on a path of madness which is paved by kleptomania and sexual obsession. As O Jeonghui matured as a writer, her work became increasingly non-imagistic and centered on the idea of family life as a trap for women. From 1990 on, O Jeonghui has published only sporadically, including one work of children's fiction, Song-I, It's Morning Outside the Door.

== Controversy ==
O was a key member of the Arts Council of Korea during the Park Geun-hye administration, which was found to have compiled a blacklist of artists and authors who were considered leftist and cut them off from public exhibitions and government funding. The Korean Publishers Association cancelled O's participation in the Seoul International Book Fair as a promotional ambassador after a group of cultural organizations including the Writers Association of Korea held a press conference and protested against the appointment.

== Work ==
O Jeonghui has received both the Yi Sang Literary Award and the Dong-in Literary Award, South Korea's most prestigious prizes for short fiction, and her works have been translated into multiple foreign languages in Southeast Asia, Latin America, the United States, and Europe.

Translations of O Jeonghui's work into English have been varied. Her most recently published work is "Spirit on the Wind". "Spirit on the Wind" alternates between the first-person narration of a husband, Se-jung, and the third-person narration of Ŭn-su, his wife. As the story begins, Se-jung ponders the latest in a series of his wife's disappearances, the first of which occurred a mere six months after their marriage. As Ŭn-su continues to wander off all of those around her, including her mother, become increasingly incredulous and troubled by Ŭn-su's behavior, which they see as an abandonment of her family. Ŭn-su herself is unhappy. She vaguely identifies the root of her wanderlust in the fact that she was an adopted child, but this never quite seems reason enough and she is, "tired of wandering, tired of feeling that the home in which she was living was temporary". Ŭn-su's continued betrayal of the family bond strains everyone, yet she is unable to control the winds that drive her. Worse, she cannot seem to summon up the memories that might explain it, "Everything before that [her 5th birthday] seemed hidden behind a dark curtain: none of it had surfaced in her mind" (55–56). The consistent and obvious metaphor in "Spirit on the Wind" is the wind itself, which is explicitly tied to memory: "Whenever she heard the wind, Ŭn-su would nod as if some long forgotten memory has just then surfaced" (50); and she is left with only, "her anxious quest for identity to be stirred up and given wing by the slightest breath of wind" (56). Ŭn-su's marriage collapses. Ŭn-su is finally reunited with her memories, but by the time that comes, it is too late for a happy ending. Ŭn-su remains in search of that wind that can blow her clean. This work is an example of O Jeonghui's later work in which women "perceive, with fear and trembling, the abyss of emptiness that is the origin of and the truth of human existence."

The short collection Chinatown contains three stories: the eponymous "Chinatown", "Wayfarer", and "The Release", translated by Bruce Fulton and Ju-Chan Fulton. "Chinatown" takes place in Incheon (once Chemulpo)'s famous Chinatown, a tourist destination in the modern era, but a slum at the time. Though the story is placed in the post-war era, and though it features unavoidable fallout from the war, it is much more a coming of age tale than a tale about effects of the war. The heart of the story is of a nine-year-old girl who comes to a greater awareness of sex and death. As the narrative moves forward, the girl observes the relationship, family, and eventual death of a prostitute named Maggie, as well as the sad death of her own grandmother. As backdrop to these events, O Jeonghui presents the seventh pregnancy of the girl's mother, blending these stories into a collage representing the circle of life, ending with a final graceful note in a one sentence paragraph with which the narrator concludes her story: "My first menstrual flow had begun."

"Wayfarer" is the sad story of a woman who has been abandoned (in a cruel replay of childhood trauma) by her family and society. After killing a burglar, and spending two years in a mental hospital, Hye-Ja returns to a world that wants no part of her. Family and friends have reframed the killing of the burglar as the murder of a man who may or may not have been somehow related to Hye-Ja. In other words, Hye-Ja is suspected of having killed her lover. O Jeonghui cleverly weaves metaphors of blankness, coats of snow, and inaccessibility to paint a picture of Hye-Ja's isolation, an isolation so profound that Hye-Ja is spurned even by beggars. At the end, drunk and staggering, Hye-Ja walks down a road that she knows will never end.

"The Release" portrays a mother and daughter united by a shared but separate tragedy. Both women have lost their husbands at an early age, and in a culture that is historically inimical to widows, this is a social kiss of death. The pain they share is exacerbated by the mother's intimate knowledge of what her daughter must undergo.

"The Bronze Mirror" is in at least two collections, including the seminal Land of Exile. In "The Bronze Mirror" an elderly couple live with memory of their son, killed twenty years earlier in the April 1960 student revolution.

The Bird is a thoroughly depressing story of two siblings in the economic slump of the mid-1990s. A 12-year-old girl and her brother are abandoned by their abusive father (who has already driven away the mother). The children are semi-adopted by an eclectic set of neighbors but soon enter an apparent downward spiral.

== Works in English translation ==
- "Evening Game", "Chinatown", "Words of Farewell" (in Words of Farewell: Stories by Korean Writers. trans. Bruce and Ju-Chan Fulton, Seattle: Seal Press, 1989)
- "Wayfarer" (in Wayfarer: New Fiction by Korean Women, ed. and trans. Bruce and Ju-Chan Fulton, Seattle: Women in Translation, 1997)
- "Chinatown", "Wayfarer", "The Release" (in Chinatown, trans. Bruce and Ju-Chan Futon, Seoul: Jimoondang, 2003)
- "Wayfarer" (trans. Bruce and Ju-Chan Fulton in Modern Korean Fiction, ed. Bruce Fulton and Youngmin Kwon, New York: Columbia University Press, 2005)
- "The Bronze Mirror" (trans. Bruce and Ju-Chan Fulton in Land of Exile: Contemporary Korean Fiction, rev. and exp. ed., trans. Marshall R. Pihl and Bruce and Ju-Chan Fulton, Armonk, NY: M.E. Sharpe, 2007)
- "Spirit on the Wind" (in The Red Room: Stories of Trauma in Contemporary Korea, trans. Bruce and Ju-Chan Fulton, Honolulu: University of Hawai'i Press, 2009)
- The Bird (trans. Jenny Wang Medina, 2005)
- River of Fire and Other Stories (trans. Bruce and Ju-Chan Fulton, New York: Columbia University Press, 2012)
- "Chinatown" (trans. Bruce and Ju-Chan Fulton, Seoul: Asia Publishers, 2012)
- "Wayfarer" (in The Future of Silence: Fiction By Korean Women, ed. and trans. Bruce and Ju-Chan Fulton, Brookline, MA: Zephyr Press, 2016)
- "The Garden Party" (trans. Bruce and Ju-Chan Fulton in The Southern Review 59, no. 2 [Spring 2023], 250–68)
- "Wayfarer" (trans. Bruce and Ju-Chan Fulton in The Penguin Book of Korean Short Stories, ed. Bruce Fulton, London: Penguin UK, 2023)

== Works in Korean (partial) ==
- "River of Fire" (불의 강; 1977)
- "Childhood Garden" (유년의 뚤; 1981)
- "Spirit on the Wind" (바람의 넋; 1986)
- Nae Maumui Munee (내 마음의 무늬; essay; 2012)

== Awards ==
- Yi Sang Literary Award (1980) for "Evening Game" (Jeonyeogui geim)
- Dong-in Literary Award (1983) for "The Bronze Mirror" (Donggyeong)
