= Jeong Yi-hyeon =

South Korean novelist (born 1972)

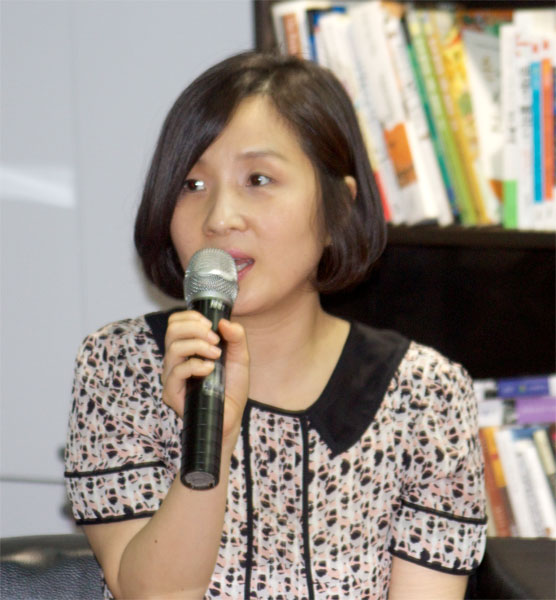
- Jeong Yi-hyeon at SIBF 2014
- Born: 1972 (age 53–54); Seoul, South Korea
- Education: Sungshin Women's University; Seoul Institute of the Arts
- Occupation: Novelist
- Writing career
- Language: Korean

Korean name
- Hangul: 정이현
- RR: Jeong Ihyeon
- MR: Chŏng Ihyŏn

Jeong Yi-hyeon (born 1972) is a South Korean novelist.

== Life ==
Jeong Yi-hyeon was born in Seoul in 1972. She graduated from Sungshin Women's University Graduate School, and studied in the Department of Creative Writing at Seoul Institute of the Arts.

== Career ==
Jeong Yi-hyeon began her literary career in 2001. In 2002, she received the New Writer's Award by Moonji. Soon thereafter, her short story The Loneliness of Others (타인의 고독) received the Lee Hyo-seok Literary Award, and Sampoong Department Store (삼풍백화점) received the Modern Literary Award.

Jeong Yi-hyeon is also an innovator in the field of Internet serialization in Korea, having written her second novel You Do Not Know, on the Kyobo Book Center blog. Initial posting of chapters resulted in 400,000 visitors to the serial.

== Works ==
In opposition to the Korean literary tradition of focusing on the marginalised and dispossessed, Jeong Yi-hyeon depicts the dating, marriage, career lives, desires and conflicts of urban women. Her works are frequently set in the wealthy Seoul neighborhood of Gangnam. She is known to describe those things in a sharp and cheerful way.

My Sweet City (달콤한 나의도시) is considered to be the beginning of her fame. It is regarded as the origin of representative South Korean chick lit. After My Sweet City was published, it ignited a chick lit craze in Korea. My Sweet City is considered to describe accurately women in their 30s. It was made into a Korean drama, and aroused sympathy from women in their 20s and 30s.

LIST Magazine summarizes her work:

Jung chooses to handle this reality through a “politics of masquerade” in the Baudrillardian sense. Jung’s characters happen to be young women with office jobs who are blatantly well-adjusted to the system. They are vicious and not ashamed of their desires to climb the socioeconomic ladder. In “Romantic Love and Society,” marriage is a means of moving up to higher social classes. In “Trunk,” fashion and cars are status symbols. The women are so conniving and sly that they are subject to ridicule in the end, which is Jung’s point. By portraying individuals who have become perfect embodiments of consumer capitalism, Jung reveals the phoniness of these individuals and the situation that surrounds them. Jung thus explores ways for literature to remain political in an age where politics to have lost its relevance.

== Awards ==
- Literature and Society New Author Award (2002)
- Yi Hyo-seok Literary Award (2004)
- Hyundae Literary Award (2006)
