= Yi Gyun-yeong =

South Korean writer (1951–1996)

- Born: December 30, 1951
- Died: November 10, 1996 (aged 44)
- Writing career
- Language: Korean
- Genre: Fiction
- Notable work: The Other Side of Dark Remembrance

Korean name
- Hangul: 이균영
- Hanja: 李均永
- RR: I Gyunyeong
- MR: I Kyunyŏng

Yi Gyun-yeong (Korean: 이균영; December 30, 1951 - November 10, 1996) was a South Korean writer.

== Life ==
Yi Gyun-yeong was born in 1951 in South Jeolla Province. He graduated from Hanyang University and later worked as a Professor of Korean History at Dongduk Women's University. Yi won the Yi Sang Literature Prize, awarded by the Dong-A Ilbo, in 1984. His important works include a collection of stories titled The Faraway Light (1986) and the novel The Country of Lao-Tzu and Chuang-Tzu. In 1996 Yi died in a car crash at the age of 44. In English, his most famous work is The Other Side of Dark Remembrance, which was originally published in 1979 as a shorter story titled Division.

From 1986 until his early death, Yi was an editor of Historical Criticism published by Research Institute for Historical Problems. Yi primarily focused on the Korean independence movement. His work on Singanhoe, an independence group, which culminated in Study of Singanhoe (Singanhoe yeongu, 1993), earned Yi the 8th Danjae Scholastic Award. Study of Singanhoe is considered to be the first research text that provides an unbiased view of Singanhoe. In 1993, he published a full-length novel The Country of Laozi and Zhuangzi (Nojawa jangjaui nara). Another novel The Leaves Make Lights of Longing (Namunipdeureun grieun bulbiteul mandeunda), appeared in the 1997 Spring issue of World Literature, after Yi's death. Other works include the children's books, Scary Dance (Museo-un chum, 1986) and The Color of Winter Dream (Gyeoul kkumui saeksang, 1986) as well as a research work titled, Patriotic Enlightenment Movement During the Period of Daehanjeguk (Hanmal aeguk gyemong undong, 1991).

Yi Gyun-yeong's fiction has three distinctive aspects. First, his subjects and themes often focus on people who have been dispossessed and are wandering. Second the stories tend to have an autobiographical style - that is they are the life story of one man or a family. Finally, like many writers of the era, Yi Gyun-yeong's stories have a profound awareness of the painful history of Korea.

== Work ==
=== Works in English ===
- The Other Side of Dark Remembrance. ISBN 8988095553.

=== Works in Korean (partial) ===
Academic

- Study of Singanhoe (Singanhoe yeongu, 1993)
- Patriotic Enlightenment Movement During the Period of Daehanjeguk (Hanmal aeguk gyemong undong, 1991)

Novels

- The Country of Laozi and Zhuangzi (Nojawa jangjaui nara; 1995)
- The Leaves Make Lights of Longing (Namunipdeureun grieun bulbiteul mandeunda; 1995)

Children's books

- Scary Dance (Museo-un chum, 1986)
- The Color of Winter Dream (Gyeoul kkumui saeksang, 1986)

Short story collections

- The Faraway Light (1986)
