= Park Sangwoo =

South Korean writer (born 1958)

Park Sangwoo (Korean: 박상우; born July 2, 1958) is a South Korean writer. He made his literary debut in 1988 when his novella Seureojiji anneun bit (스러지지 않는 빛 A Light That Doesn't Fade Out) won the Munye Joongang Literary Award for Best First Novel. His works include the short story collection Shagarui maeure naerineun nun (샤갈의 마을에 내리는 눈 The Snow Falling on Chagall's Village) and the novels Hotel Kaeliponia (호텔 캘리포니아 Hotel California), Cheongchunui dongjjok (청춘의 동쪽 East of Youth), and Kkamaquitte geurimja (까마귀떼 그림자 Shadows Cast by a Murder of Crows). In 1999 he received the 23rd Yi Sang Literary Award for his short story "Nae maeumui oktapbang" (내 마음의 옥탑방 The Attic of My Heart).

== Life ==
Park Sangwoo was born in Gwangju, South Korea in 1958 and grew up in the city of Pocheon. His family moved to Myeongju County in 1966 when his father, a professional soldier, retired from service. He graduated Chuncheon High School in 1974 and received a degree in creative writing at Chung-Ang University in 1981. He taught at Girin Middle School in Inje County and Hwangji Middle School in the city of Taebaek. He became a full-time writer following his literary debut. He wrote mostly poetry as a college student, but after witnessing a friend commit suicide out of despair over the political turmoil of South Korea in 1980, he gave up poetry and wrote fiction.

== Writing ==
Park Sangwoo's early work, including his debut novella Seureojiji anneun bit (스러지지 않는 빛 A Light That Doesn't Fade Out), explored the destruction of the individual by a violent, institutional power. But Park began to question his writing methods and thematic vision in the mid-1990s, under the pressure of being a full-time writer positioned awkwardly between a generation of young writers in their twenties and that of older writers who were active in the 1980s. Park stopped writing realist works after penning the composite novel Hotel Kaeliponia (호텔 캘리포니아 Hotel California), published in 1996.

This change in Park's style coincides with the period of social upheaval in South Korea from the late 1980s to early 1990s, during which most of the country's writers felt a strong sense of disconnect with the transformed society. If Korean literature in the 1980s urged for social change and focused on the division of the Korean peninsula or the unethical use of power or capital, such themes lost their relevance in the 1990s. Accordingly, Park moved away from political themes in the mid-1990s and examined themes like desire, isolation, and disconnect.

This shift is first seen in Satanui maeure naerineun bi (사탄의 마을에 내리는 비 Rain Falling on Satan's Village), Park's short story collection published in 2000. The stories portray the lonely and demonic side of modern people who, driven mad by the monotony of their lives, destroy themselves and others. An apocalyptic mood runs through the work, which calls reality "the village of Satan" or the tedious hell of anonymous and objectified souls.

== Works ==
1. 비밀 문장 (2016)

Secret Sentences (2016)

2. 인생을 충전하는 99가지 이야기 (2011)

99 Stories to Recharge Your Life (2011)

3. 작가 (2009)

The Writer (2009)

4. 인형의 마을 (2008)

The Village of Dolls (2008)

5. 혼자일 때 그곳에 간다 (2008)

I Go There When I’m Alone (2008)

6. 짬봉 (2007)

Jjamppong (2007)

7. 길모퉁이 추락천사 (2006)

The Fallen Angel around the Corner (2006)

8. 화성 (2005)

Mars (2005)

9. 칼 (2005)

Knife (2005)

10. 지붕 (2005)

Roof (2005)

11. 사랑보다 낯선 (2004)

Stranger than Love (2004)

12. 반짝이는 것은 모두 혼자다 (2003)

All That Glitters Is Alone (2003)

13. 노란 잠수함 (2003)

Yellow Submarine (2003)

14. 열대야 (2003)

Tropical Night (2003)

15. 백마, 그 폐허 (2003)

The Ruin of Baekma (2003)

16. 가시면류관 초상 (2003)

Portrait of Crown of Thorns (2003)

17. 산타페 (2002)

Santa Fe (2002)

18. 내 마음의 옥탑방 (2002)

The Attic of My Heart (2002)

19. 말무리 반도 (2002)

The Peninsula of Wild Horses (2002)

20. 까마귀떼 그림자 (2001)

Shadows Cast by a Murder of Crows (2001)

21. 내 영혼은 길 위에 있다 (2000)

My Soul Is On the Road (2000)

22. 사탄의 마을에 내리는 비 (2000)

Rain Falling on Satan’s Village (2000)

23. 따뜻한 집 (1994)

Warm House (1994)

24. 청춘의 동쪽 (1999)

East of Youth (1999)

25. 카시오페아 (1997)

Cassiopeia (1997)

26. 소설가는 유서를 남기지 않는다 (1996)

A Novelist Does Not Leave a Will (1996)

27. 백야 (1996)

White Night (1996)

28. 블루 노트 (1996)

Blue Note (1996)

29. 호텔 캘리포니아 (1996)

Hotel California (1996)

30. 독산동 천사의 시 (1995)

The Poem of the Doksan-dong Angel (1995)

31. 섬 그리고 트라이앵글 1, 2, 3 (1994)

The Island and Triangle Volumes 1-3 (1994)

32. 나는 인간의 빙하기로 간다 (1993)

I Leave for the Ice Age of Humans (1993)

33. 술병에 별이 떨어진다 (1993)

Stars Fall on the Liquor Bottle (1993)

34. 시인 마태오 (1992)

Matthew the Poet (1992)

35. 샤갈의 마을에 내리는 눈 (1991)

The Snow Falling on Chagall’s Village (1991)

36. 지구인의 늦은 하오 (1990)

Late Afternoon for People on Earth (1990)

37. 사람구경 (1988)

Observing People (1988)

=== Works in Translation ===
1. 荆棘冠冕的画像 (Chinese)

== Awards ==
- 2009: Tong-ni Literature Prize
- 1999: Yi Sang Literary Award
