= Bangeojin =

Area in Ulsan, South Korea

Coordinates: 35.5107°N 129.4224°E

Bangeojin (Korean: 방어진) is an area in the Dong-gu district of Ulsan, South Korea. It houses the world's largest shipbuilding plant, belonging to Hyundai. It was an eup from 1936 to 1962, when it was absorbed into the new city of Ulsan.

Bangeojin was the site of shipbuilding activity beginning in 1929, when the Japanese colonial regime established an iron works there. The Hyundai shipbuilding works was established there in 1972.
