= Yun Heunggil =

South Korean novelist (born 1942)

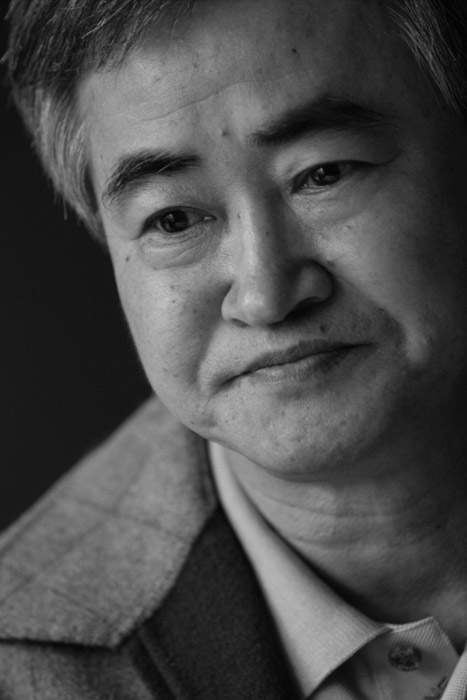
- Born: 14 December 1942 (age 83)
- Writing career
- Language: Korean

Korean name
- Hangul: 윤흥길
- Hanja: 尹興吉
- RR: Yun Heunggil
- MR: Yun Hŭnggil

Yun Heunggil (born 14 December 1942) is a South Korean novelist known for his treatment of conflicts between the individual and society. He received his degree in Korean literature from Wonkwang University in 1973. In 1977 he won the Korean Literature Writers Award.

== Life ==
Yun Heunggil was born 14 December 1942 in Jeongeup, Jeollanam-do in Korea. He graduated from Jeonju Teachers School and Wonkwang University. Originally a schoolteacher, he has made a living as a writer since 1976, while also teaching at the university level.

== Work ==
Yun's career can be divided into three phases. In the first phase, with often partly autobiographical works written during the early 1970s, Yun uses a young male narrator to depict a gloomy existence in which the family is threatened by internal or external troubles. Works of these periods include The Rainy Spell and The Lamb.

In a later phase, his novels shifted focus to depict life under the authoritarian Park Chunghee regime, in which the primary tensions are between personal conscience and material well-being, which was proposed by Park Chunghee. In 1977, he entered into the third stage with the publication of The Man Who Was Left as Nine Pairs of Shoes, in which the characters actively resist the forces oppressing them.

Yun currently works as a professor of creative writing at Hanseo University, Seosan.

== Works in translation ==
- The Rainy Spell and other Korean Stories (중단편 소설선 <장마>) - a Collection
- "The Rainy Spell" (Jimoondang Edition)
- "The Man Who Was Left as Nine Pairs of Shoes" in Land of Exile Contemporary Korean Fiction
- "The Man Who Was Left as Nine Pairs of Shoes" (Bilingual edition) Asia Press
- "The House of Twilight" (1989) London: Readers International (ISBN 0-930523-59-8)

== Works in Korean (partial) ==
Short story collections

- The House of Twilight (1976)
- The Man Who Was Left as Nine Pairs of Shoes (1977)
- The Rainy Spell (1980),
- A Dreamer’s Fortress (1987)
- Heaven or Angel? (2003)

Novels

- Sea of Revelation (1978)
- Armband (1983)
- Mother (1990)

Linked Short Story Collection

- Way to Soradan (2003).

== Awards ==
- 4th Korean Literature Writer Award for "The Man Who Was Left as Nine Pairs of Shoes" in 1977
- 5th Hankook Ilbo Literary Award (previously called the Korean Creative Literature Award) for the novella A Dreamer’s Fortress in 1983
- 28th (1983) Contemporary Literature (Hyundae Munhak) Award for Armband
- 6th Twenty-first Century Literature Award for Forest Fire in 2000
- 12th Daesan Literary Award for the linked collection The Way to Soradan in 2004.

== See also ==
- List of Korean novelists
- Korean literature
- Contemporary culture of South Korea
