= Kim Sang-woo (footballer, born 1987) =

South Korean footballer

Kim Sang-Woo
Personal information
- Full name: Kim Sang-Woo
- Date of birth: May 18, 1987 (age 39)
- Place of birth: Jinju, South Korea
- Height: 1.74 m (5 ft 9 in)
- Position: Midfielder

Team information
- Current team: Gimhae City
- Number: 18

Youth career
- 2003–2005: Yanagaura High School
- 2008–: Niigata University of Management

Senior career*
Years	Team	Apps	(Gls)
2006–2007	Tokushima Vortis	31	(1)
2012–	Gimhae City		
- * Club domestic league appearances and goals as of 28 July 2012

- Kim Sang-woo
- Hangul: 김상우
- Hanja: 金尚佑
- RR: Gim Sangu
- MR: Kim Sangu

Kim Sang-woo (born May 18, 1987 in Jinju) is a South Korean midfielder. He currently plays for Gimhae City FC.

== Club statistics ==
Club performance			League		Cup		Total	
Season	Club	League	Apps	Goals	Apps	Goals	Apps	Goals
Japan			League		Emperor's Cup		Total	
2006	Tokushima Vortis	J2 League	7	1	0	0	7	1
2007	Tokushima Vortis	J2 League	24	0	0	0	24	0
Country	Japan		31	1	0	0	31	1
Total			31	1	0	0	31	1
