= Kim Won-il =

South Korean writer

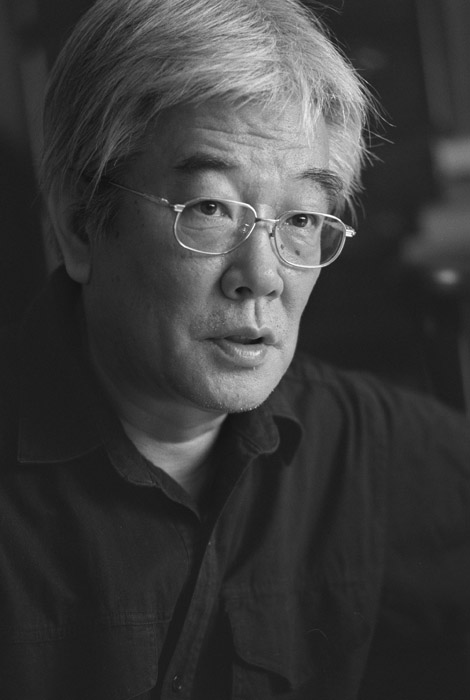
- Born: March 15, 1942; Gimhae, South Korea
- Occupation: Writer
- Writing career
- Language: Korean
- Period: 1970-present
- Notable work: Evening Glow

- Kim Won-il
- Hangul: 김원일
- Hanja: 金源一
- RR: Gim Wonil
- MR: Kim Wŏnil

Kim Won-il (Note: This is the author's preferred Romanization per LTI Korea,) (born 1942) is a South Korean writer.

== Life ==
Kim Won-il was born on March 15, 1942, in Gimhae, Gyeongsangnam-do. Kim was only a child when his father, a communist activist, defected to the North during the Korean War. The father left his wife and four children behind, to a legacy of great poverty and a cloud of ideological suspicion. Kim attended Daegu Agriculture High School, and holds bachelor's degrees from Sorabol College of Arts and Yeungnam University and a master's degree in Korean Literature from Dankook University.

He made his literary debut in 1966 when his short story “Algeria, 1961” was chosen as the winner of a contest sponsored by Daegu Daily News. The following year, his story “A Festival of Darkness” (Eodumui chukje) was selected for publication in Contemporary Literature (Hyeondae munhak).

As of 2013, Kim works in the Creative Writing Department at Sunchon National University, where he works with Korean poet Kwak Jae-gu.

== Work ==
With this background, Kim began writing in the early 1970s. His first works were short stories studded with childhood trauma and bitter memories, with families destroyed by unspecified conflicts. In other words, retellings of his own experiences, He published his first collection of stories, Soul of Darkness, in 1973 and it garnered the Hyundai Munhak Literary Prize in 1974. His first full-length novel, Twilight, was published in 1978.

Kim was a representative of "peoples literature," the literature in which authors argued, or portrayed a world in which, all the tragedies of Korea were the result of the separation of the nation by foreign powers directly after liberation. This literature argued that without the division there would not have been ideological feuding between the North and South, no sundered families, and no need for the dictatorships that ensued in the South. Consequently, in the 1980s, Korean authors began to focus on the issue of division and its results. This was called the "literature of division" and Kim Won-il was one of its strongest writers.

Kim believed that the war and division have left scars that economic prosperity cannot erase. In his novel Winter Valley (apparently Korean only), Kim retells the story of the massacre of the entire village of Koch’ang, who were killed on the suspicion that the village had worked with communist guerrillas during the Korean War. Kim captures the psychological landscape of the scared-witless villagers caught between the Scylla and Charybdis of leftwing and rightwing ideologies and the communist guerrillas hiding at the edges of Koch’ang.

The overall message contained in Kim Won-il's work, which ended in the 1993 nine-volume novel The Evergreen Pine is that historically determined suffering can be overcome, as can human frailty.

Kim's autobiographical novel A House with a Deep Garden was turned into a popular TV series in 1990. In volume 7, no 1 of Acta Koreana, Kim's Prison of the Heart was translated by Michael Finch and is also available online in a translation by Brother Anthony of Taize.

=== Works in translation ===
Evening Glow
The Wind and the River
Soul of Darkness
Prisons of the Heart
House with a Sunken Courtyard
The Scorpion
Crepuscules (French)
Das Haus am tiefen Hof (German)
rлyбoким двором: Pоман (Russian)
La casona de los patios (Spanish)
La cárcel del corazón y otros relatos (Spanish)

=== Works in Korean (partial) ===
Spirit of Darkness (Eodum ui chukje, 1973)
Today's Wind (Oneul buneun baram, 1976)
Evening Glow (Noeul, 1978)
Meditations on a Snipe (1979)
Chains of Darkness (Eodumui saseul, 1979)
A Festival of Fire (Buleui jejeon, 1983)
Wind and River (Baram gwa gang, 1985)
Winter Valley (1987)
House with a Deep Garden (1989)
The Long Road From Here to There (Geugose ireuneun meon gil, 1992)
The Evergreen (Neul pureun sonamu, 1993)
The Scorpion (Jeongal 2007)

== Awards ==
- Contemporary Literature (Hyundae Munhak) Award (1974)
- The Republic of Korea President's Award in Literature (1978)
- The Korean Creative Writers’ Prize (1979)
- The Dong-in Literature Prize (1983)
- The Yi Sang Literature Prize (1990)
- The Han Musuk Literature Prize (1998).
