= ASIA Publishers =

South Korean book publisher

Coordinates: 37.508°N 126.962°E

- Founded: 2006
- Country of origin: South Korea
- Headquarters location: Seodal-ro 161-1, Dongjak-gu, Seoul, South Korea
- Distribution: Worldwide
- Key people: Kim Jae-beom (Publisher); Bang Hyeon-seok (Executive Editor)
- Publication types: Books
- Fiction genres: Korean translated literature
- Official website: www.bookasia.org www.facebook.com/asiapublishers

ASIA Publishers (Korean: 도서출판 아시아) is a Seoul-based book publisher best known for producing multi-volume series of translated Korean literature in bilingual format, generally at novella length and usually featuring a short biography of the author, a background of the social and historical setting of the work, and a brief collection of Korean critical response to the works.

== History ==
ASIA Publishers was started in 2006, by publisher Kim Jae-Boom, publishing its first collection/magazine ASIA (Now titled Storytelling ASIA), which is a quarterly magazine of Asian literature. The magazine collects and publishes short stories, poetry, recent issues in Asia, essays, and book reviews. In 2012 ASIA Publishers began publishing series of Korean fiction in both English and Korea in a 5 collection (intended) to be 7 collections eventually series intended to cover all of "early modern" (up until about the year 2000) Korean fiction. These volumes, titled the “Bi-lingual Edition Modern Korean Literature” were sub-grouped by theme, with collection #1, for instance, focusing on Partition and Division, Industrialization, and Women in Korean Society. The authors were a broad range and generally well known (some in translation) including, Kyoung-sook Shin (Please Look After Mom), Park Wan-so (Who Ate up all the Shinga), Kim Won-il, (Soul of Darkness), and Hwang Sok-yong (The Road to Sampo).

In fact, the publication of these works was considered significant enough to be noted on the Cheong Wa-Dae (청와대, the Korean equivalent of the White House in the United States.) website.

Currently, ASIA Publishers is printing a "K-Fiction Series", which is intended to appeal to a younger audience. This series includes authors Park Min-gyu and Son Bo-mi, who represent the cutting edge of contemporary Korean fiction. The current book titles include: Dinner with Buffet (Park Min-gyu); Arpan (Park hyoung su); My Clint Eastwood (Oh Han-ki); Dishonored (Choi Min-Woo); and, Hot Air Balloon (Son Bo-mi), with more to follow.

== Publications ==
- ASIA Magazine (The quarterly magazine of Asian literature)
- "Bi-lingual Edition Modern Korean Literature" Series
- "K-Fiction" Series
- A Fine Balance by Rohinton Mistry (Korean)
- Such a Long Journey by Rohinton Mistry (Korean)
- Family matters by Rohinton Mistry (Korean)
- Ramayana (Korean)
- Mahabarata (Korean)
- Shahnameh (Korean)

== Journal Volumes ==
- VOL. 1 NO. 1 (SUMMER 2006)
- VOL. 1 NO. 2 (AUTUMN 2006)
- VOL. 1 NO. 3 (WINTER 2006)
- VOL. 2 NO. 1 (SPRING 2007)
- VOL. 2 NO. 2 (SUMMER 2007)
- VOL. 2 NO. 3 (AUTUMN 2007)
- VOL. 2 NO. 4 (WINTER 2007)
- VOL. 3 NO. 1 (SPRING 2008)
- VOL. 3 NO. 2 (SUMMER 2008)
- VOL. 3 NO. 3 (AUTUMN 2008)
- VOL. 3 NO. 4 (WINTER 2008)
- VOL. 4 NO. 1 (SPRING 2009)
- VOL. 4 NO. 2 (SUMMER 2009) Indian Special
- VOL. 4 NO. 3 (AUTUMN 2009) Vietnamese Special
- VOL. 4 NO. 4 (WINTER 2009) Philippine Special
- VOL. 5 NO. 1 (SPRING 2010) Mongolian Special
- VOL. 5 NO. 2 (SUMMER 2010) Palestine Special
- VOL. 5 NO. 3 (AUTUMN 2010) Indonesian Special
- VOL. 5 NO. 4 (WINTER 2010) Turkish Special
- VOL. 6 NO. 1 (SPRING 2011) Special Focus on Asians reflecting on Asia and its future
- VOL. 6 NO. 2 (SUMMER 2011) Special Focus on Arab writers discuss ‘Jasmine Revolution’
- VOL. 6 NO. 3 (AUTUMN 2011) Special Focus on The contemporary Chinese literature landscape through writers
- VOL. 6 NO. 4 (WINTER 2011) Special Focus on Story heritages of Asia
- VOL. 7 NO. 1 (SPRING 2012) Special Focus on Hanoi
- VOL. 7 NO. 2 (SUMMER 2012) Special Focus on Shanghai
- VOL. 7 NO. 3 (AUTUMN 2012) Special Focus on Sapporo
- VOL. 7 NO. 4 (WINTER 2012) Special Focus on Delhi
- VOL. 8 NO. 1 (SPRING 2013) Special Focus on Seoul
- VOL. 8 NO. 2 (SUMMER 2013) Special Focus on Istanbul
- VOL. 8 NO. 3 (AUTUMN 2013) Special Focus on Taipei
- VOL. 8 NO. 4 (WINTER 2013) Special Focus on Asian cities and writers
- VOL. 9 NO. 1 (SPRING 2014) Special Focus on Vladivostok
- VOL. 9 NO. 2 (SUMMER 2014) Special Focus on Bangkok
- VOL. 9 NO. 3 (AUTUMN 2014) Special Focus on Incheon
- VOL. 9 NO. 4 (WINTER 2014) Special Focus on Hong Kong
- VOL. 10 NO. 1 (SPRING 2015) Special Focus on Siem Reap
