= Cheon Unyeong =

South Korean writer (born 1971)

- Born: 1971 (age 54–55)
- Writing career
- Language: Korean
- Period: 2000–present

- Cheon Unyeong
- Hangul: 천운영
- RR: Cheon Unyeong
- MR: Ch'ŏn Unyŏng

Cheon Unyeong (Korean: 천운영, born 1971) is a modern South Korean writer.

== Life ==
Cheon Unyeong was born in 1971 in Seoul, South Korea. She studied creative writing at Seoul Institute of the Arts, and graduated from Hanyang University with a B.A. in journalism. She attended graduate school at Korea University's School of Literature. Although Cheon Unyeong has only produced two volumes of short stories, she is considered a groundbreaking Korean author, and her works have been the subject of much analysis and critical acclaim.

== Career ==
The Literature Translation Institute of Korea summarizes Cheon's work:

Cheon's works depart significantly from such thematic concerns as love, extra-marital affairs, and urban or middle-class sensibilities that characterized many of the fictional works by women in the 90s. The women in Cheon's fictional world are defined not by their reaction to the traditional views of women but by their hedonistic tendencies and the feral, primeval instincts they possess. Such a vision of womanhood is often expressed through visceral and visually shocking images. "Breath" features an old woman who works at a butcher's shop and relishes every part of the cows she dresses out for sale. She eats pieces of raw cow brain as a delicacy; she believes liver is a cure for dizziness and entrails, for indigestion. Her love for meat is taken to its grotesque extreme when she begins hankering for the taste of cow fetus. In "The Needle," the protagonist is a tattooist who enjoys watching the first drop of blood oozing from skin. Female aggression embodied in the act of tattooing is contrasted against emasculated manhood symbolized by a monk whose murder provides the mystery that drives the narrative forward.

Cheon locates the source of such aggression in the prolonged state of oppression, alienation or fear. In "The Needle," the protagonist's work as a tattooist parallels her mother's work as an embroiderer and points at her mother's unhappy relationship with a monk. In "Your Ocean," violent images of writhing eels being skinned alive accentuate the protagonist's feeling of abandonment due to his father's absence. Aggressive, animalistic behaviors are a defense mechanism triggered by the harsh reality, Cheon tells us.

== Works ==
=== Works in translation ===
- Adieu le cirque! (잘가라, 서커스)

=== Works in Korean (partial) ===
- The Needle (바늘, 2001)
- Myeongrang (명랑, 2004)
