= Hyundae Munhak Award =

South Korean publishing company

Hyundae Munhak Awards
- Awarded for: Outstanding contributions in literature
- Country: Korea
- Presented by: Hyundae Munhak
- First award: 1956
- Website: Contemporary Literature

The company Contemporary Literature (“Hyundae Munhak” in Korean), founded in South Korea in 1954, is one of the leading publishing companies in the literary field and has been publishing the nation's most prestigious monthly literary magazine Hyundae Munhak and a wide range of books on humanities and arts.

Hyundae Munhak also presents annual literary awards, which are among the most prestigious in Korea.

About this award, the company says:

The company Contemporary Literature annually honors the year's most outstanding works in fiction, poetry and criticism through its annual Contemporary Literature Prize, one of the most coveted literary awards in Korea, to encourage creative spirit of the literary elites of the nation.
The magazine Contemporary Literature has been playing the role of steering wheel in the history of modern Korean literature, is available in major libraries across the world, and serves as the most reliable source for the study of contemporary Korean literature.

== Award Winners: Fiction ==
- 1956 Son Changseop 「血書」「未解決의 章」「人間動物園抄」
- 1957 Kim Gwangsik 「二一三號 住宅」
- 1958 Park Kyung-ni 「不信時代」「玲珠와 고양이」
- 1959 Lee Beomseon 「갈매기」「死亡保留」
- 1960 Seo Giwon 「孕胎期」「오늘과 내일」
- 1961 O Yugwon 「異域의 山莊」
- 1962 Lee Ho-cheol 「板門店」
- 1963 Kwon Taeung 「假主人散調」
- 1964 Han Malsook 「흔적」「광대 김서방」
- 1965 Lee Munhui 장편『墨麥』
- 1966 Lee Gwangsuk 「卓子의 位置」「賭博師」
- 1967 Choi Sanggyu 「下午의 巡遊」「寒春無事」
- 1968 Jung Eulbyeong 「아데나이의 碑銘」
- 1969 Song Sangok 「熱病」
- 1970 Yoo Hyeonjong 「유다 行傳」
- 1971 Park Sunnyeo 「어떤 巴里」
- 1972 Choi In-ho 「處世術槪論」「他人의 房」
- 1973 Song Gisuk 창작집『白衣民族』
- 1974 Lee Jeha 창작집『草食』
- 1975 Kim Won-il 「잠시 눕는 풀」「波羅庵」
- 1976 Kim Munsu 창작집『聖痕』
- 1977 Jeon Sang-guk 「私刑」「껍데기 벗기」
- 1978 Lee Segi 「離別의 方式」
- 1979 Kim Guktae 「우리 교실의 傳說」
- 1980 Yoo Jaeyong 「두고 온 사람」「호도나무골 傳說」
- 1981 Kim Yongun 「山行」
- 1982 Jo Jeongrae 「流刑의 땅」
- 1983 Yun Heunggil 장편『완장』
- 1984 Kim Yongseong 장편『도둑일기』
- 1985 Hong Seongwon 장편『마지막 偶像』
- 1986 Lee Dong-ha 「폭력요법」「폭력연구」
- 1987 Song Yeong 「친구」「보행규칙 위반자」외
- 1988 Han Seungwon 장편『갯비나리』
- 1989 Son Yeongmok 「바다가 부르는 소리」「밀랍인형들의 집」
- 1990 Hyeon Gileon 「司祭와 祭物」
- 1991 Han Su-san 「타인의 얼굴」
- 1992 Yi Mun-yol 「시인과 도둑」장편『시인』
- 1993 Park Wansuh 「꿈꾸는 인큐베이터」
- 1994 Yoon Humyeong 「별을 사랑하는 마음으로」
- 1995 Shin Kyung-sook 「깊은 숨을 쉴 때마다」
- 1996 Yang Gwija 「곰 이야기」
- 1997 Lee Sunwon 「은비령」
- 1998 Yoon Dae-nyeong 「빛의 걸음걸이」
- 1999 Kim Young-ha 「당신의 나무」
- 2000 Kim Insuk 「개교기념일」
- 2001 Marcias Sim 「美」
- 2002 Lee Hye-gyeong 「고갯마루」
- 2003 Jo Kyung-ran 「좁은 문」
- 2004 Seong Seokje 「내 고운 벗님」
- 2005 Yoon Seonghui 「유턴지점에 보물지도를 묻다」
- 2006 Jung Ihyun 「삼풍백화점」
- 2007 Lee Seung-u 「전기수傳奇叟 이야기」
- 2008 Kim Gyeonguk 「99%」
- 2009 Ha Seong-nan 「알파의 시간」 (The Time of Alpha)
- 2010 Park Seongwon 「얼룩」 (Stain)
- 2011 Jeon Gyeongrin 「강변마을」 (Riverside Village)
- 2012 Jeon Seongtae 「낚시하는 소녀」 (Fishing Girl)
- 2013 Kim Soom 「그 밤의 경숙」 (Kyungsook in That Night)
- 2015 Pyun Hye-young 「소년이로」
- 2016 Kim Chaewon 「베를린 필」 (The Berlin Philharmonic)
- 2017 Kim Keum-hee 「체스의 모든 것」 (All About Chess)

== Award Winners Poetry ==
- 1956 - Kim Guyong - 「잃어버린 姿勢」「그네의 微笑」
- 1957 - Park Jaesam - 「春香이 마음」
- 1958 - Lee Subok - 「꽃씨」외
- 1959 - Gu Jaun - 「異香二首」「墓碑名」
- 1960 - Jeong Gongchae - 「石炭」「自由」
- 1961 - Kim Sangeok - 「秘敎錄序」
- 1962 - Lee Jonghak - 「피의 꿈속에서」
- 1963 - Park Bongu - 「四月의 火曜日」
- 1964 - -
- 1965 - Park Seongryong - 「東洋畵集」외
- 1966 - Lee Seonggyo - 시집『山吟歌』
- 1967 - -
- 1968 - Hwang Tong-gyu - 「四行詩抄」외
- 1969 - Kim Hu-ran - 시집『粧刀와 薔薇』
- 1970 - Lee Sungboo - 시집『李盛夫 詩集』
- 1971 - Yoo Gyeonghwan - 「겨울 저녁 바다」
- 1972 - Kim Yeongtae - 「鉛筆畵 몇점」
- 1973 - Park Jaereung - 시집『밤과 蓮花와 上院寺』
- 1974 - Kim Gwanghyeop - 시집『千波萬波』
- 1975 - Kang Usik - 시집『四行詩抄』
- 1976 - Moon Chung-hee - 시극집『새떼』
- 1977 - Choi Wongyu - 연작시집『비 속에서』
- 1978 - Ham Hyeryeon - 시집『강물이 되어 바다가 되어』
- 1979 - Park Jecheon - 연작시「心法」
- 1980 - Lim Seongsuk - 시집『소금장수 이야기』
- 1981 - Kim Hyesuk - 시집『豫感의 새』
- 1982 - Oh Kyu-won - 시집『이 땅에 씌어지는 서정시』
- 1983 - Kim Jonghae - 「賤奴 일어서다」
- 1984 - Lee Seunghun - 시집『事物들』
- 1985 - Kim Wonho - 시집『행복한 잠』
- 1986 - Kim Seokgyu - 시집『저녁 혹은 패주자의 퇴로』
- 1987 - Lee Suik - 시집『단순한 기쁨』
- 1988 - Kim Hyeongyeong - 시집『다른 하늘이 열릴 때』
- 1989 - Park Jeongman - 「다 가고」외
- 1990 - Lee Geoncheong - 시집『하이에나』
- 1991 - Hwang Ji-u - 시집『게눈 속의 연꽃』
- 1992 - Kang Eun-gyo - 「그대의 들」 외
- 1993 - Im Yeongjo - 시집『갈대는 배후가 없다』
- 1994 - Jo Jeonggwon - 「튀빙겐 가는 길」
- 1995 - Jeong Hyeonjong - 「내 어깨 위의 호랑이」
- 1996 - Kim Chohye - 「만월」외 4편
- 1997 - Hong Sinseon - 「해, 늦저녁 해」
- 1998 - Cheon Yanghui - 「오래된 골목」외 4편
- 1999 - Jang Seoknam - 「마당에 배를 매다」외 6편
- 2000 - Kim Myeongin - 「그 등나무꽃 그늘 아래」외 6편
- 2001 - Kim Gitaek - 「불룩한 자루」외 6편
- 2002 - Choi Seungho - 「두엄」 외 6편
- 2003 - Na Huideok - 「마른 물고기처럼」 외 5편
- 2004 - Kim Seonu - 「피어라, 석유!」 외 6편
- 2005 - Kim Sain - 「노숙」 외 5편
- 2006 Park Sangsoon - 「목화밭 지나서 소년은 가고」 외 5편
- 2007 Choi Jeongrye 「그녀의 입술을 따스하고 당신의 것은 차거든」외 4편
- 2008 Lee Seong-bok 「기파랑을 기리는 노래―나무인간 강판권」외 6편
- 2009 Mah Chonggi 「파타고니아의 양」외 6편
- 2010 Go Hyeongryeol 「옥수수수염귀뚜라미의 기억」외 5편
- 2011 Jin Eunyeong 「그 머나먼」외 6편
- 2012 Kim Soyeon 「오키나와, 튀니지, 프랑시스 잠」외 7편
- 2013 Lee Geunhwa 「한밤의 우리가」외 6편
- 2014 Heo Yeon 「북회귀선에서 온 소포」외 7편
- 2015 Lee Gi-seong 「굴 소년의 노래」외 5편

== Award Winners Criticism ==
- 1956 - -
- 1957 - Choi Ilsu - 「현대문학의 근본특질」
- 1958 - -
- 1959 - Yoo Jongho - 「비평의 반성」「산문정신고」
- 1960 - Kim Sangil - 「近代詩人論」
- 1961 - Won Hyeonggap - 「해석적 비평의 길」
- 1962 - -
- 1963 - -
- 1964 - Moon Deoksu - 「전통론을 위한 각서」「신라정신의 영원성과 현실성」
- 1965 - -
- 1966 - Chun Idu - 「한국단편소설론」
- 1967 - -
- 1968 - -
- 1969 - -
- 1970 - Hong Gisam - 「주제의 변천」「전위예술론」
- 1971 - Lee Yusik - 「한국소설론」
- 1972 - Kim Gyoseon - 「東仁 문학의 근대성의 저변 」
- 1973 - Kim Yunsik - 「식민지문학의 상흔과 그 극복」
- 1974 - Kim Yeonggi - 평론집『한국문학과 전통』
- 1975 - Kim Unhak - 「현대불교문학론」「한국적 테마론」
- 1976 - Yoon Jaegeun - 「시정신과 그 비극성」「李箱의 시사적 위치」
- 1977 - Lee Seonyeong - 평론집『상황의 문학』
- 1978 - Kim Yongjik - 「대중사회와 시의 길」
- 1979 - Cho Byeongmu - 평론집『가설의 옹호』
- 1980 - Jeong Changbeom - 「朴木月의 시적변용」
- 1981 - Kim Hyeon - 평론집『문학과 유토피아』
- 1982 - Kim Chisu - 「일상언어와 문학언어」「朴景利 <土地> 분석」
- 1983 - Kim Byeongik - 평론집『지성과 문학』
- 1984 - Park Cheolhui - 「근대시 형식과 조선시 논의」평론집『서정과 인식』
- 1985 - Kim Sitae - 평론집『문학과 삶의 성찰』
- 1986 - -
- 1987 - Park Donggyu - 「한국소설의 전개」
- 1988 - Kim Jaehong - 평론집『현대시와 열린 정신』
- 1989 - Cho Namhyeon - 평론집『삶과 문학적 인식』
- 1990 - Kwon Yeongmin - 「월북문인연구」
- 1991 - Lee Dongha - 평론집『혼돈 속의 항해』
- 1992 - Lee Namho - 「비유법 그리고 고통 혹은 절망의 양식」「현실에 대한 관찰과 존재에 대한 통찰」
- 1993 - Lee Sangok - 평론집『이효석―문학과 생애』
- 1994 - Shin Donguk - 평론집『우리 시의 짜임과 역사적 인식』
- 1995 - -
- 1996 - Oh Saenggeun - 평론「숨결과 웃음의 시학」
- 1997 - Hong Jeongseon - 평론「맥락의 독서와 비평」
- 1998 - Do Jeongil - 평론「우리는 모르는 것을 경배하나니」
- 1999 - Seong Minyeop - 평론「불의 체험과 그 기록」
- 2000 - Jeong Gwari - 「유령들의 전쟁」「죽음 옆의 삶, 삶 안의 죽음」
- 2001 - Nam Jinu - 「행복의 시학, 유출의 수사학」
- 2002 - Ryu Boseon - 「두 개의 성장과 그 의미-『외딴방』과 『새의 선물 』에 대한 단상」
- 2003 - Lee Gwangho - 「굿바이! 휴먼-탈내향적 일인칭 화자의 정치성」
- 2004 - Kwon Oryong - 「비하(飛下/卑下)의 상상력이 우리에게 묻는 것-배수아의 『일요일 스키야키 식당』」
- 2005 - Kim Yeongchan - 「한국문학의 증상들 혹은 리얼리즘이라는 독법」
- 2006 - Hwang Jongyeon - 「민주화 이후의 정치와 문학―고은 『만인보』의 민중-민족주의 비판」
- 2007 - Bok Dohun - 「축생, 시체, 자동인형ㅡ2000년대 젊은 작가들의 소설에 등장한 캐릭터와 신(新)인류학」
- 2008 - -
- 2009 - -
- 2010 - Sim Jingyeong - 「김애란을 다시 읽는다」
- 2011 - -
- 2012 - Park Hyegyeong - 「일상의 정치학」
- 2013 - -

== Award Winners Drama ==
- 1956 - -
- 1957 - -
- 1958 - Kim Yangsu - 「민족문학 확립의 자세」
- 1959 - Im Huijae - 『꽃잎을 먹고 사는 기관차』
- 1960 - Oh Hakyeong - 「深淵의 다리」「抗拒」
- 1961 - -
- 1962 - -
- 1963 - -
- 1964 - -
- 1965 - -
- 1966 - -
- 1967 - -
- 1968 - Oh Hyeryeong - 「인간적인 진실로 인간적인」
- 1969 - -
- 1970 - -
- 1971 - -
- 1972 - Oh Taeseok - 「移植手術」
- 1973 - -
- 1974 - Yoon Daeseong - 「奴婢文書」
- 1975 - -
- 1976 - -
- 1977 - -
- 1978 - Yoon Jobyeong - 「참새와 機關車」
- 1979 - Lee Hyeonhwa - 장막「우리들끼리만의 한 번」
- 1980 - Lee Jaehyeon - 희곡집『李仲燮』
- 1981 - -
- 1982 - Hong Seungju - 희곡집『목마른 太陽』
- 1983 - -
- 1984 - -
- 1985 - -
- 1986 - -
- 1987 - Oh Taeyeong - 「전쟁」「트로이얀 테바이」
- 1988 - Kim Sukhyeon - 「젊은 왕자의 무덤」
- 1989 - -
- 1990 - -
- 1991 - -
- 1992 - -
- 1993 - -
- 1994 - -
- 1995 - -
- 1996 - -
- 1997 - -
- 1998 - -
- 1999 - -
- 2000 - -
- 2001 - -
- 2002 - -
- 2003 - -
- 2004 - -
- 2005 - -
- 2006 - -
- 2007 - -
- 2008 - Kim Mihyeon - 「수상한 소설들―한국 소설의 이기적 유전자」
- 2009 - -
- 2010 - -
- 2011 - -
- 2012 - -
- 2013 - -
