= Oh Myung Hee =

Korean artist

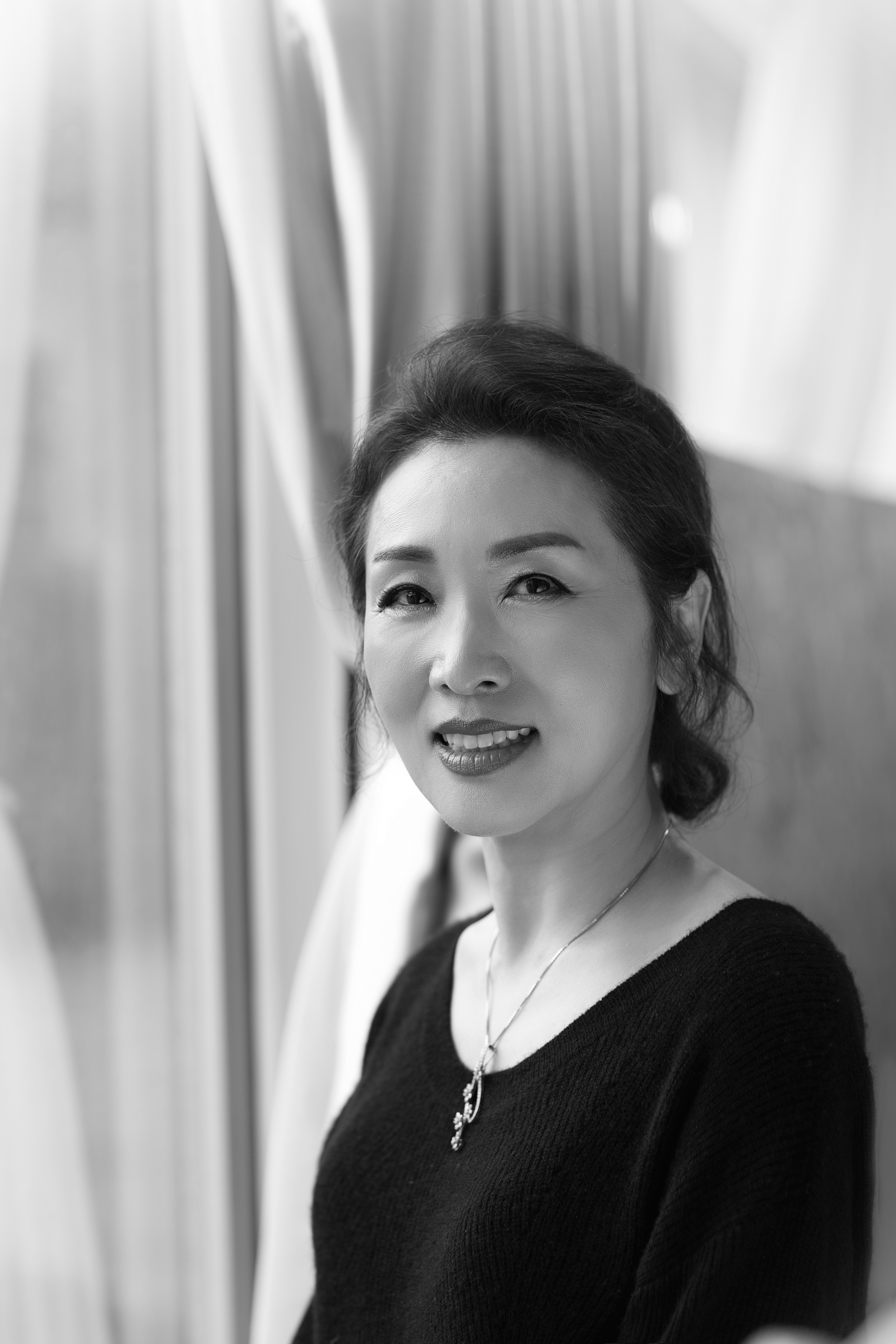

Oh Myung Hee (born 1956) is a Korean visual artist.

== Biography ==
Oh Myung Hee is a graduate of Sejong University. She holds an honorary professorship from the College of Art & Design at Suwon University, South Korea.

Known for her three-dimensional works, videos, and multimedia, Oh Myung Hee has exhibited extensively in the Far East and Western Europe, including a solo exhibition at London’s Saatchi Gallery, the Kaze Gallery in Osaka, the Galerie Bhak, (Bhak Young-Duk) in Seoul, and at Espace Miromesnil in Paris.

She was selected to participate in the Personal Structures exhibition by the European Cultural Centre at the 59th Venice Biennale.
