= Dong-in Literary Award =

The Dong-in Literary Award (Korean: 동인문학상) is a South Korean literary award named after novelist Kim Dong-in, established in order to honour the literary achievement of The Republic of Korea. In commemoration of the Korean modern literature pioneer, Kim Dong-In, this award is given each year to the novelists with short and mid-length works published in the main Korean literary magazines to promote the creativity of domestic novelists. The award was established in 1955 and is currently run by the Chosun Ilbo, a newspaper of record for South Korea. The winners of the literary award since 1956 are:

== Winners ==
Year	Author (Hangeul)	Author (English)	Title (Hangeul)	Title (English)
1956	김성한	Kim Seonghan	바비도	Babido
1957	선우휘	Seonu Hwi	불꽃	Fiery Flame
1958	오상원	O Sangwon	모반	Betrayal
1959	손창섭	Son Changseop	잉여인간	Surplus Men
1960	이범선	Yi Beomseon	오발탄	Stray Bullet
1960	서기원	Seo Giwon	이 성숙한 밤의 포옹	This Embrace of a Ripe Evening
1961	남정현	Nam Jeonghyeon	너는 뭐냐	What are You
1962	이호철	Yi Hocheol	닳아지는 살들	Eroding Mountain
1962	전광용	Jeon Gwangyong	꺼삐딴 리	Kapitan Lee
1964	송병수	Song Byeongsu	잔해 (3)	Debris 3
1965	김승옥	Kim Seungok	서울 1964년 겨울	Seoul, Winter of 1964
1966	최인훈	Choi In-hoon	웃음소리	Laughter
1967	이청준	Yi Cheongjun	병신과 머저리	The Cripple and the Fool
1979	조세희	Cho Se-hui	난장이가 쏘아올린 작은 공	Dwarf Hurls a Ball
1980	전상국	Jeon Sang-guk	우리들의 날개	Our Wing
1982	오정희	Oh Jung-hee	동경	Bronze Mirror
1982	이문열	Yi Munyol	금시조	Golden Wing
1984	김원일	Kim Won-il	환멸을 찾아서	In Search of Disillusion
1985	정소성	Jeong Soseong	아테네 가는 배	Ship to Athens
1987	유재용	Yoo Jae-yong	어제 울린 총소리	Yesterday’s Gunshot
1988	박영한	Park Yeonghan	지옥에서 보낸 한철	A Season in Hell
1989	김문수	Kim Munsu	만취당기	Record of Manchi Party
1990	김향숙	Kim Hyangsuk	안개의 덫	Pitfall in the Fog
1991	김원우	Kim Wonu	방황하는 내국인	Wandering Homelander
1992	최윤	Choe Yun	회색 눈사람	Gray Snowman
1993	송기원	Song Giwon	아름다운 얼굴	Beautiful Face
1994	박완서	Park Wan-suh	나의 가장나종 지니인것	My Very Last Possession
1995	정찬	Jeong Chan	슬픔의 노래	Song of Sorrow
1996	이순원	Yi Sunwon	수색, 어머니 가슴속으로 흐르는 무늬	A Quest, The Pattern Flowing into Mother’s Heart
1997	신경숙	Shin Kyung-sook	그는 언제 오는가	When Is He Coming?
1998	이윤기	Yi Yungi	숨은 그림 찾기1	Seeking Hidden Picture 1
1999	하성란	Ha Seongnan	곰팡이꽃	Flower of Mold
2000	이문구	Yi Mungu	내 몸은 너무 오래 서 있거나 걸어왔다	My Body Stood Too Long, Walked Too Long
2001	김훈	Kim Hun	칼의 노래	Ode to the Sword
2002	성석제	Seong Sukje	황만근은이렇게말했다	Thus said Hwang Man Keun
2003	김연수	Kim Yeonsu	내가 아직 아이였을 때	When I was Still an Infant
2004	김영하	Kim Yeongha	검은꽃	Dark Flower
2005	권지예	Gwon Jiye	꽃게무덤	Blue Crab Mound
2006	이혜경	Yi Hyegyeong	틈새	The Gap
2007	은희경	Eun Huigyeong	아름다움이 나를 멸시한다	Beauty Snubs Me
2008	조경란	Jo Gyeongnan	풍선을 샀어	Buying a Balloon
2009	김경욱	Kim Gyeonguk	위험한 독서	Dangerous Reading
2010	김인숙	Kim Insuk	안녕, 엘레나	Goodbye Elena
2011	편혜영	Pyeon Hyeyeong	저녁의 구애	The Courtship of the Evening
2012	정영문	Jeong Yeongmun	어떤 작위의 세계	A World of Artificiality
2013	이승우	Lee Seung-u	지상의 노래	Earthly Song
2014	구효서	Gu Hyo-seo	별명의 달인	
2015	김중혁	Kim Jung-hyuk	가짜 팔로 하는 포옹	
2016	권여선	Lee Seung-u	안녕 주정뱅이	
2017	김애란	Kim Aeran	바깥은 여름	
2018	이기호	Lee Ki-ho	누구에게나 친절한 사람	
2019	최수철	Choi Suchol	독의 꽃	
2020	김숨	Kim Soom	떠도는 땅	
2021	윤성희	Yoon Sung-hee	날마다 만우절	
