= Kim Jung-hyuk =

Kim Jung-hyuk may refer to:

- Kim Jung-hyuk (footballer)
- Kim Jung-hyuk (author)
