= Flowers of Mold =

Collection of short stories by Ha Seong-nan

- Cover, 2019 publication
- Author: Ha Seong-nan
- Translator: Janet Hong
- Language: Korean, translated in English
- Genre: Short story collection
- Published: 2019 (Open Letter Books) (Korean, 1999)
- Publication date: 1999
- Publication place: Korea
- English publication date: April 23, 2019
- Media type: Print (Paperback)
- Pages: 240
- Award: Dong-in Literary Award
- ISBN: 978-1940953960
- Website: https://www.openletterbooks.org/products/flowers-of-mold

Flowers of Mold is a collection of ten short stories written by Ha Seong-nan. Originally published in Korean in 1999 by Ch'angjak kwa Pip'yŏngsa under the title Yŏpchip yŏja (옆집 여자) or The Woman Next Door, the collection was translated by Janet Hong and published in English in 2019. Featuring separate characters and settings, each story contains different angles of Korean culture and life. Many of the stories share common literary and symbolic themes. The collection has received an award for the original Korean publication, and the translated version has received praise from abroad.

== Short stories ==
The original order in the Korean edition:

1. 옆집 여자 [The Woman Next Door]
2. 깃발 [Flag]
3. 악몽 [Nightmare]
4. 즐거운 소풍 [The Retreat]
5. 촛농 날개 [Waxen Wings]
6. 당신의 백미러 [Your Rearview Mirror]
7. 곰팡이꽃 [Flowers of Mold]
8. 치약 [Toothpaste]
9. 올콩 [Early Beans]
10. 양파 [Onion]

The following summaries are in the order of the English translation.

=== Waxen Wings ===
This story follows the life of Birdie, a girl who wishes to fly. In her pursuit of flight, she finds gymnastics and joins a team. She gets better by the day, due to her advantageous small stature, but it does not last long. She hits a growth spurt in high school and is soon unable to perform the stunts she could before. She eventually quits the team and begins to focus on a new future as her dream of attending gymnastics nationals crumbles. Coping with her new life, she meets a movie store owner and has a brief relationship with him before he leaves town. Birdie then decides to take on hang-gliding. She feels that she can finally fly as she wished so badly for in her gymnastics days. However, her flight is short-lived as she crashes and loses a leg in the accident. From her hospital room, she sees a vision of herself when she was small and believed she could fly.

=== Nightmare ===
"Nightmare" follows the sexual assault of a girl on her family's pear orchard. The story begins when she wakes up and urges her parents to remember her assault from the night before, but they refuse to remember and claim she just had a nightmare. To prove her claim, she investigates the pear orchard. She searches for a man with a cut, hoping the swing she took at her attacker with a clock left an identifiable mark. She finds a young worker with a bandage and talks to him in private. He gives her shears, daring her to stab her rapist with the tool if she is truly being attacked at night. The girl works as a tutor but stops showing up for work; instead, she travels into Seoul on multiple occasions to dress up and walk along the streets, returning home drenched from the rain feeling soiled by the city. Finally, her attacker comes in the night again and she stabs him in the back with the shears and crushes his head with a shovel. She buries his body in the orchard and confesses to her parents the next morning. However, they can no longer find the body and reassure her that it was merely a nightmare.

=== The Retreat ===
A rumor spreads among the Taewang tenants that the owner, Kwak, is going to sell the building. Following a meeting with the tenants about an annual retreat, Kwak argues with the building director about his plans. He shoves the director into a glass cabinet, accidentally killing him. Kwak frantically attempts to cover up the murder by hiding the body of the director in his car. He soon fears that the tenants know of his crime, and plots to kill them in a freak boating accident on the retreat. Unbeknownst to him, the tenants, whose livelihoods depend on their tenancy in the building, are plotting in parallel to kill Kwak before he can evict them. The tenants gather with Kwak in front of the building, prepared for the retreat. They all smile for a picture.

=== The Woman Next Door ===
The short story titled "The Woman Next Door" follows the events between a couple and their child and the woman that moves in next door. Myeonghui introduces herself and befriends the family by borrowing various objects, beginning with a spatula. As she replaces the borrowed objects with new versions and becomes more involved in each of the family members' lives, the wife Yeongmi begins to forget things: forgetting clothes in the washer, forgetting her son at school, and eventually forgetting who she is. Yeongmi begins trying to memorize countries and their capitals to reclaim her life. Despite her effort to fix her memory, Myeonghui seems to replace Yeongmi as a mother and wife by fulfilling the forgotten duties. While the thrill of shoplifting first brings Yeongmi and Myeonghui together, it is also what tears Yeongmi from her family. Yeongmi is caught shoplifting (she is unsure if it was due to the scouring pads she stuffed into her bra or the gum planted in her shopping bag) and begins repeating the capitals and countries she memorized. Myeonghui comforts Yeongmi's husband and comments that his wife has cracked. Yeongmi then realizes it is too late and her neighbor has stolen her life just as she has stolen her spatula.

=== Flag ===
This story begins with an electrician who has been called to fix a power outage. At the outage location, he climbs up the assigned pole and finds the clothing of a man and a journal in the pocket of the trousers. The remainder of the story is formatted as a journal. The logs begin with accounts from the journal owner's bus commute to work every day. He notes that he passes an advertisement for a trip to Hawaii every morning. A beautiful woman is featured in the advertisement, and the man becomes infatuated with her. He is employed as a car salesman, meticulously shining the windows in front of the dealership every day. One day, the woman from the advertisement appears in front of the dealership and eyes the sedan that is displayed. He learns that her name is Yi Minjae. The man later meets up with old friends and gets drunk, imagining he arrived home to meet Yi Minjae. However, this was just a dream, and he wakes up on the bus. The next morning at the dealership, Yi Minjae appears again and asks for a test drive. The man enthusiastically complies, as he wants to sells the expensive sedan and impress the Yi Minjae. But as he pulls out of the vehicle display, he realizes too late that he did not open the glass doors he had polished, and he crashes through them and into a streetlight. The electrician attempts to find the man but finds no success.

=== Your Rearview Mirror ===
This story follows a security guard known as the "Mirror Man" (named after the reflective sunglasses he wears). As he watches over the various areas in the shopping center in which he is stationed, he takes interest in a woman who he sees admiring a grey dress. She returns to the store every twenty-eight days, eventually attempting to steal the dress. The man catches her in the act and scolds her, but he does not turn her in. As he lets her go, she leaves a lighter in his pocket inscribed with a number where he can reach her. Using this number, the man finds her in a club and watches as she performs a magic act. The man learns her name, Choi Sun-ae, and her stage name, Luna, and she asks him to become her partner for her act. Working with her regularly, the man slacks on his security job, which leads to a pay cut. Deciding to quit the job for the magic act, the man and Choi Sun-ae break into the shopping center where he worked, steal the dress she was looking at previously, and drive off. On the way to their next show, their bus crashes. The man looks for Choi Sun-ae in the wreckage and finds her skirt up, revealing that she is transgender. Following this discovery, the man sustains a serious head injury as the seat above him falls. Waking up in the hospital, the man learns that nobody died during the bus crash. Asking for Choi Sun-ae, the man is told there was no one on the bus with that name. He bumps into a young man with long hair and claims to recognize him, but the young man denies it.

=== Flowers of Mold ===
This story, sharing the name of the collection, is about a man living in an apartment alone. He hears someone yelling and getting kicked out of the adjacent apartment, 507. After the neighbors leave, he sneaks down the stairs of his complex to dig through the tenants' trash. He brings it back to his apartment and takes inventory of its contents. A drunk man carrying flowers rings the door, and falls in, saying that he is looking for 507. The neighboring apartment goes dark for several days, and the man notices the balcony door is shattered. The woman living there returns, and the man notices the flowers the drunk man had left were covered in maggots. The man steals one of the woman's shoes while she is out and later finds the other one in the trash, thus identifying the garbage as hers. Sifting through her garbage, the man finds a pager number and calls it, but reaches someone else. The man finds 507 being repainted and discovers that the woman has moved out. The drunk man returns, and they both search outside the complex for a statue that the woman used to break the balcony door.

=== Toothpaste ===
This story starts with a flashback. The main character was previously in the military, and spent most of his service guarding a rooftop surrounded by advertising billboards. Back in the present day, the guard at his apartment complex hands the man a letter he found addressed to him, but the man claims it is not for him. The man, who is late for his job, steps into the screening room at the advertising company for which he works and watches their new ad for toothpaste. He is in charge of coming up with the slogan for the campaign. Staying after the screening, the man approaches the woman who is on their ad (Choi Myeong-ae) to ask if they know each other. Choi Myeong-ae denies it. The man notices she wears a dress with many buttons. At his apartment complex, the man receives another letter, which describes trying to put on a dress with many buttons. The man still thinks the letter is for someone else. The next day at work, the company is shooting another advertisement. Following the shoot, Choi Myeong-ae calls the name that had been addressed on the letter to the man. He realizes that she was the star of his biggest advertising slogan, although the slogan never helped her career. They meet again on the bus and the man acknowledges that they had met before, but refrains from bringing up her past career. He admires her smile, which he thinks is going to be famous after the commercial.

=== Early Beans ===
This story begins with a man in traffic, waiting for school children to get out of his way as he drives to the mall. He is supposed to pick up gifts and think of a joke for a woman's birthday. He crashes into a delivery driver, and they are both injured. While the delivery driver is waiting for surgery, he asks the man to deliver his package. The man takes the subway to get to Icheon but does not know the area. Three high school girls join him in his subway car, and they act casually and ignore the man. The man is very distracted by the girls, and he notices that they do nothing to cover up when their skirts expose them. He grows uncomfortable, and the girls eventually leave, with one claiming to have won a bet. They were betting on the man looking up their skirts. After exiting the subway, the man uses a map that the delivery driver made to find landmarks near the destination. While walking to the address, the man catches up to one of the high school girls from the subway, who is the daughter of the client who ordered the package. The man promises not to tell the father if she meets up with him later. They meet and take a taxi to the mall. The girl disguises herself and leaves him. The man returns to his apartment complex and gets insulted by the woman whose birthday he missed.

=== Onion ===
This story opens up with a flash-forward of two policemen investigating a crime scene, which they allege is a double suicide. Earlier, a man who is closing up a restaurant looks up to see a woman peering in. The woman, looking very weary, enters and asks for some food. The man prepares fish, but she is startled when the fish's tongue falls out, causing the man to cut his cheek and injure his foot. Flashing back, the woman is at the daycare she works at. The woman drives several sick children to the pediatric clinic. At the clinic, she sits down and realizes that she sat on a baby, smothering it. Panicking, she leaves and drops the kids back off at the daycare center. She does not return to her apartment but keeps running away. She eventually finds herself at the Japanese restaurant. In the present day, the man received stitches and a cast for his foot. The man and the woman drive to the east coast together. The woman calls the pediatric clinic to see if the child is dead, but the receptionist does not believe she is serious. They both come to a small house and stay there with the woman who owns it. The man, searching for a job, drives to the city with the woman. He crashes into a pole.

== Themes and influences ==
The overarching devices used throughout the collection are primarily the use of rot, heat, and claustrophobia. The theme of rot is significant in the plots, particularly in the short stories "Nightmare" and "Flowers of Mold". In "Nightmare", critics argue that the ripening and rotting of pears on the orchard mirror the value the workers and the people of the city give her as she sexually matures. After her repetitive assaults, she is viewed as bruised, soiled, rotten like fallen fruit. Likewise, "Flowers of Mold" presents the theme of rot to show a duel meaning; the progression of the neighboring couple's relationship and the parasitic nature of the man that goes through the trash. The man brings flowers in hopes of salvaging their relationship, but the flowers never make it to her and they become infested with maggots. As a maggot finds its way into rotten trash, the man finds his way into the lives of his neighbors and becomes obsessed with learning more.

Heat and claustrophobia share a similar role throughout the collection. In stories like "The Woman Next Door" and "Early Beans", the unbearable heat of summer both tempts and confines. The mother in "The Woman Next Door" is trapped in her sizzling apartment for the majority of the story, yet the heat also tempts her to stuff her bra with the cold scrubber, which leads to her breaking point. In "Early Beans", the man starts his journey in his scorching car on his way to meet his date. He enters the story optimistic despite the heat, but by the end of the story his relationship has fallen apart and he is drenched in sweat. Ha Seong-nan uses these sources of imagery and their duality to create suspense, the consistent ominous tone, and lend commentary on the Korean lifestyle. Analyzing these common themes and their implications, some critics argue that Flowers of Mold acts as a model of the divide in socioeconomic status as well as the gender norms of the time. Others claim that the collection highlights the issues of urban living in South Korea and the symbolism of apartments in the modern world.

== Critical reception ==
Flowers of Mold received the Dong-In Literary Award in 1999. Following publication in the U.S., reviewers have given the collection praise for its use of seemingly normal situations with unnatural circumstances. Flowers of Mold has also received praise for its view of Korean city life.

== See also ==
• Ha Seong-nan
