= Seung-woo =

- Hangul: 승우
- RR: Seungu
- MR: Sŭngu
- IPA: [sɯŋu]

Seung-woo, also spelled Sung-woo, is a Korean given name.

== People ==
People with this name include:

=== Sportspeople ===
- Han Seung-woo (sport shooter) (born 1983), South Korean sport shooter
- Choi Seung-woo (born 1989), South Korean track cyclist
- Nam Seung-woo (born 1992), South Korean football midfielder (Belgian Second Division)
- Ryu Seung-woo (born 1993), South Korean football forward (Bundesliga)
- Lee Seung-woo (born 1998), South Korean football forward and midfielder (Spanish youth league)

=== Entertainers ===
- Kim Seung-woo (born 1969), South Korean actor
- Cha Seung-woo (born 1978), South Korean singer and actor
- Cho Seung-woo (born 1980), South Korean actor
- Han Seung-woo (born 1994), South Korean singer
- Yoo Seung-woo (born 1997), South Korean singer

=== Others ===
- Lee Seung-u (born 1959), South Korean writer

== See also ==
- List of Korean given names
