= Lee Soon-won =

Lee Soon-won may refer to:

- Lee Soon-won (writer)
- Lee Soon-won (actor)
