= Lee Mun-ku =

South Korean novelist

- Born: April 12, 1941
- Died: February 25, 2003 (aged 61)
- Writing career
- Language: Korean

Korean name
- Hangul: 이문구
- Hanja: 李文求
- RR: I Mungu
- MR: I Mun'gu

Lee Mun-ku (Korean: 이문구) was a South Korean novelist.

== Life ==
Lee Mun-ku was born in Boryeong, South Chungcheong Province, South Korea. Lee graduated from Sorabol Arts College with a degree in creative writing. Lee edited various magazines and publishing companies, including Shilchon Munhak-sa and was a founding member and officer of the Freedom Activist Writers' Association as well as being an officer of the League of Korean Writers and serving as the chairman of the Liaison Committee of the Korean Writer's Association and director of the Korean International PEN Club.

== Work ==
While he was a student in the Creative Writing Department at Sorabol College of Arts, his talent was recognized by the influential fiction writer Kim Dongri, and Lee Mungu published his first stories, "Dagalla Monument" (Dagalla bulmangbi, 1965) and "White Waves" (Baekgyeol, 1966), in Contemporary Literature (Hyundae Munhak) at his recommendation. After graduating from college, Lee Mungu worked for several literary journals, including Literature Monthly (Wolgan munhak), Korean Literature (Hanguk munhak), and Literature of Praxis (Silcheon munhak), and joined the Association of Writers for Literature of Freedom and Practice (Jayu silcheon munin hyeobuihoe).

The subject of Lee's literary explorations is agrarian Korean society in transition. From very early on in his career, Lee revealed his interest in the harsh reality of Korean farming and fishing villages and the lives of rural people alienated by industrialization. Stories like "This World of Woe" (Yi pungjin sesangeul) and "The Cow" (Amso) offer, for example, realistic slices of contemporary rural life and an insider's look at the humble dreams and daily frustrations of farmers in these villages. The Dream of Everlasting Sorrow (Janghanmong, 1972), on the other hand, focuses on the urban poor. Countryfolk dislocated in the process of industrialization and forced to work as day laborers, the characters are now far away from the land of their ancestral home. An undercurrent of longing flows through the text.

Nostalgia for a place and way of life that no longer exist also lies at the heart of The Ballad of Kalmori (Gwanchon supil, 1977). The volume contains retrospective accounts of scenes and persons from the author's childhood in Gwanchon Village. Lee provides sketches of a vanishing ethos connected with the Korean countryside a way of life based on hospitality, reciprocity, and fundamental reverence for the living. For these virtues, critics agree that The Ballad of Kalmori is a text worthy of being called the highest literary tribute to the lost world of traditional Korea.

Lee's concern with the impact of industrialization on Korean countryside continues in Our Neighborhood. Whereas The Ballad of Kalmori is somewhat an idealized attempt to recollect a past way of life in rural communities, Our Neighborhood discusses contemporary realities faced by Korean farmers. The village of Our Neighborhood is a place invaded by three-fold pollution: contamination of the natural environment; destruction of the balance in local economy by the infiltration of industrial capital; and a growing trend toward mutual distrust among the villagers themselves. In the process, Lee articulates a sharp critique of the network of forces contributing to the material and spiritual destitution of rural communities.

== Works in Korean (Partial) ==
Collections

- The Ballad of Kalmori
- The Sea Wall (Haebyeok 1974)
- Thistle Leaf (Eonggeongkwi ipsae, 1977)

Novels

- The Southern Village Over the Mountain (San neomeo namchon, 1990)
- Maewoldang Kim Siseup (1992)

Stories

- This World of Woe" (Yi pungjin sesangeul)
- The Cow" (Amso)
- The Dream of Everlasting Sorrow (Janghanmong, 1972)

== Awards ==
- Korean Creative Writing Prize 1972
- Korean Literature Writers Award 1978
- Shin Dongyeong Fund for Writers 1982
- Chungang Creative Writing Fellowship 1989
- Yosan Literature Prize 1990
- Manhae Literature Award 1993
- Dong-in Literary Award (2000)
- Daehan Mingug Literature and Arts Award (2001)
