= Park Yeonghan =

South Korean writer

- Born: September 14, 1947
- Died: August 23, 2006 (aged 58)
- Writing career
- Language: Korean

Korean name
- Hangul: 박영한
- Hanja: 朴榮漢
- RR: Bak Yeonghan
- MR: Pak Yŏnghan

Park Yeonghan (Korean: 박영한; September 14, 1947 – August 23, 2006) was a South Korean writer.

== Life ==
Park Yeonghan was born September 14, 1947, in Busan, Korea. Park graduated with a degree in Korean Literature from Yonsei University in Seoul.

Park applied to the Law School of Korea University, but was refused and then spent three years traveling the Korean countryside working a laborer and living with prostitutes, petty thieves, vagabonds, and other social misfits. Park was admitted to Yonsei University, but two days after entering, volunteered to serve in the Vietnam War. When he returned to Korea, Park wrote The Distant Ssongba River (Meonameon ssongbagang, 1977) based on his experience in the war. He was awarded the second Today's Writer Prize, the novel sold over 100,000 copies and made Park an instant celebrity.

Park died on August 23, 2006.

== Work ==
The Korea Literature Translation Institute summarizes Parks' contributions to Korean Literature:

Park’s literary world is largely inspired by his experiences and can be divided into different thematic or stylistic groups according to the particular experience reflected.? The novels Love in Umukbaemi (Umukbaemiui sarang) and Wang Lung’s Family (Wangnung ilga, 1988), products of the author’s life in Ssukbaemi Village in the outskirts of Seoul, realistically portray everyday lives of common people at the periphery of Korea’s modernization with hearty, descriptive and often humorous language, which marks a departure from the concise writing style utilized in The Distant Sssongba River. Although Park’s thematic concerns are as varied as the experiences he has had in his life, they seem to reflect a certain concern for the corruption of humanity by external forces, whether it be the ideological warfare described in The Distant Ssongba River or rural industrialization in Love in Umukbaemi.

Park is known for his 'honest' writing style, eschewing experimentation, and less interested in plot than experience.

== Works in Korean (Partial) ==
Short Stories

- A Single Room Above Ground (Jisangui bang han kan)
- A Season Spent in Hell (Jiogeseo bonaen hancheol)

Novels

- Human Daybreak (Inganui saebyeok, 1980)
- In the Open Air (Nocheoneseo, 1981); A Lonely Freeman (Sseulsseulhan jayuin, 1983)
- Nineteen Wings (Yeol ahobui nalgae, 1985
- My Friend Papillon (Nae chingu Ppappiyong, 1989)
- Arabesque (Arabaeseukeu, 1990)

== Awards ==
- Yonsei Literature Prize (1976)
- Prize for Today's Writers (1978)
- Dong-in Literary Award (1988)
- Yonam Literary Award (1988)
