= Park Sangsoon =

South Korean poet (born 1962)

Park Sangsoon (born 1962 in Seoul) is a Korean poet.

He has published the collections of poetry: 6 is Tree, 7 is Dolphin; Marana, Heroine of a Porn Comic; Love Adagio; Passing the Cotton Field, a Boy Went Away. He is the recipient of the Contemporary Poets Group Award (1996), Contemporary Literature (Hyundae Munhak) Award (2006), and the Hyundae Poetry Award (2013).

Park Sangsoon studied fine art painting at Seoul National University. He made his debut in 1991, publishing 8 poems including "Railway to the Bread Factory" in the spring issue of the quarterly Writer's World. He has worked as editor-in-chief of a literary magazine and a publishing company.
