= Eun Heekyung =

South Korean writer (born 1959)

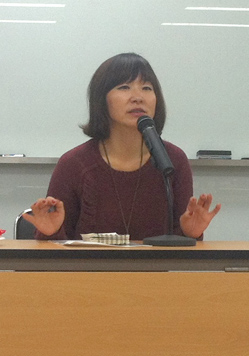
- Eun Heekyung lectures at LTI Korea
- Born: 1959 (age 66–67)
- Citizenship: South Korean
- Writing career
- Language: Korean

- Eun Heekyung
- Hangul: 은희경
- Hanja: 殷熙耕
- RR: Eun Huigyeong
- MR: Ŭn Hŭigyŏng

Eun Heekyung (Korean: 은희경; born in 1959) is a South Korean writer.

== Life ==
Eun was born in Gochang, Jeollabuk-do in 1959. She did her undergraduate degree in literature at Sookmyung Women's University, and her graduate degree in the same field at Yonsei University, both in Seoul. Her childhood was full of fairy tales and children's stories that her parents purchased for her. Eun once stated, "My most important reading was pretty much done during my childhood." Even as a student she always read books (non-schoolbooks), and also recounts reading so intently that she failed to hear that school was ending, and only realizing it when she was surrounded by silence as the other students had left. She also discovered that other students were sometimes reading her diary, and for this reason she began to intersperse into it made up stories or lines aimed at specific readers.

Eun's father was a carpenter who employed many workers. Eun noted that when these workers spoke directly to her father they spoke entirely differently from when they spoke behind his back. They also betrayed, intrigued and fought with each other, and Eun particularly remembers a carpenter running off with a cook. Eun saw these things as indicative of the warmth of human relationships between imperfect humans.

Eun left for middle school in Seoul, where she was an average student and entered Sookmyung University in 1977, a time of tremendous political tumult. Since childhood Eun had desired to be a writer, but upon her graduation from Sookmyung she took jobs as a high school teacher, editor, and reporter. In 1994 she took a leave of absence from her work and went to a temple armed with a laptop computer, nearly a dozen books, and a decades' worth of diaries. In her stay at the temple she finished five short stories and a novella. The novella was A Duet, which won a Spring Literary Contest in 1995.

== Work ==
Eun's writing combines quotidian trivialities, a sometimes jesting style, sophistication and cynicism. One of her primary themes is the impossibility of real communication between people. Eun is also a feminist, although she often departs from any kind of theoretical approach in her exploration of the larger human condition and, in fact, is intensely suspicious of any ideological approaches to life.

Eun made her entrance to the Korean literary scene in 1995 with her short novel Duet. The next year won the Munhakdongne Fiction Award for her novel A Gift From a Bird which portrayed the world of adults through the skeptical eyes of a twelve-year-old narrator. Since her debut she has written 10 books, including six collections of short stories and four novels. Secrets and Lies, published in 2005, is the three-generation story of two interrelated families.

Eun's Gift from a Bird is a coming of age novel that takes place between 1969 and 1995. Kang Jinhee, a woman in her mid-30s, reminisces about her life as a spirited twelve-year-old girl. In the beginning of the novel, she declares: “When I turned twelve, there was no need for me to grow.” In order to survive her troubled life, the young Jinhee learns to detach herself from her emotions. Asserting that people should observe themselves from a distance, she comes to possess a cynical and contemptuous personality, which becomes her defense mechanism.

Just like the character Jinhee, Eun's work is characterized by these two traits: cynicism and contempt. Regardless of their present circumstances, the characters who populate Eun's fiction observe themselves and the world around them in a cold, unforgiving light; their only means of protection is through self-disparagement. For Eun, all ideologies seem suspicious and are open to ridicule. Families, romantic love, rationality, power and prestige—without fail, they each fall under Eun's intense suspicion.

Despite her contempt and cynicism, it is ironic that much of Eun's work deals with the subject of love. Her characters seem to be contemptuous of everything around them, striving to think about events in a cold and clinical way, yet this kind of behavior perhaps arises from the fact that they yearn for connection. After all, it is no coincidence that Eun's first short story collection is titled To Talk with a Stranger. For instance, in Save the Last Dance for Me, which is the sequel to Gift from a Bird, Kang Jinhee, who is now in her late thirties, appears to scorn love but ultimately admits the value of genuine love. In Minor League, Eun ridicules mainstream male culture and advocates a space for those who do not fit into this group. The appeal of Eun's work is her unique ability to combine humor with cynicism that is sophisticated and sometimes cutting. Although Eun mocks everyday interactions and conventional mannerisms, there lies in her work a deep desire for authenticity.

Eun has won other awards including the 1997 Dongseo Literature Award, the 1998 Yi Sang Literary Award, the 2000 Korean Literature Award, the Munhak Dongne Literature Award in 1996, the Korean Literature Award for Fiction in 2000, the Hanguk Ilbo Literature Award in 2002, and the 2007 Dong-in Literary Award for Beauty Snubs Me. In 2012 her story "Discovery of Solitude" was chosen by LTI Korea as one of three short stories to be the subject of their LTI Essay competition.

In 2014, she participated in the International Writing Program's Fall Residency at the University of Iowa in Iowa City, IA.

== Works in translation ==
English

- Poor Man's Wife, (2013)
- My Wife's Boxes in Unspoken Voices (한국 여성작가 12인 단편선 )
- Beauty Looks Down on Me in "Azalea", Issue 2, 2008, p. 201

Other

- El regalo del ave, Emecé, 2009
- La stanza di mia moglie, Cafoscarina, 2004
- Ein Geschenk des Vogels, Pendragon, 2005
- Les Boîtes de ma femme, Zulma, 2009
- Das Schöne verschmäht mich (아름다움이 나를 멸시한다 )
- Тайна и ложь (비밀과 거짓말 )
- 汉城兄弟 (마이너 리그)
- 鸟的礼物 (새의 선물)
- Cocktail sugar et autres nouvelles de Corée (한국 여성문학 단편선)
- Le cadeau de l'oiseau (새의 선물)
- Qui a tendu un piege dans la pinede par une journee fleurie (상속)

== Awards ==
- Munhak Dongne Literature Award (1996)
- Dongseo Literature Award (1997)
- Yi Sang Literary Award (1998)
- Korean Literature Award for Fiction (2000)
- Hanguk Ilbo Literature Award (2002)
- Dong-in Literary Award (2007)
- Korean Literature Award (2008)

== Works in Korean (partial) ==
- Duet (이중주), 1995
- A Gift From a Bird (새의 선물), 1995
- Talking to a Stranger (타인에게 말걸기), 1996
- Save the Last Dance for Me (마지막 춤은 나와 함께), 1998
- Was it a Dream? (그것은 꿈이었을까), 1999
- Nobody Checks the Time When They’re Happy (행복한 사람은 시계를 보지 않는다), 1999
- Minor League (마이너 리그), 2001
- Secrets and Lies (비밀과 거짓말), 2005
- Beauty Looks Down on Me (아름다움이 나를 멸시한다), 2007
- Past of Light (빛의 과거), 2019
