= Heo Yeon =

South Korean poet

Heo Yeon (Korean: 허연; born August 8, 1966) is a South Korean poet and journalist. He made his literary debut in 1991 when his work was published in Modern Poetry World. His poetry collections include Buronhan geomeun pi (불온한 검은 피 Unruly Black Blood), Nappeun sonyeoni seo itda (나쁜 소년이 서 있다 A Bad Boy Is Standing), Naega wonaneun cheonsa (내가 원하는 천사 The Angel I Want), and Oship meter (오십 미터 Fifty Meters). He also wrote several essay collections, including Geu namjaui bibliophily (그 남자의 비블리오필리 That Man's Bibliophily) and Gojeontamnik (고전탐닉 Classics Obsession). He is the winner of the Korea Academic Title Award, Sijak Literary Award, and Hyundae Munhak Award. He has been writing for Maeil Business News Korea since 2016.

== Biography ==
Heo Yeon was born in Seoul, South Korea on August 8, 1966. He grew up reading classics in his attic and the local library. He was born to Catholic parents who expected him to become a priest, but he went against their wishes to pursue a literary career. He obtained his master's degree at Yonsei University and his doctoral degree at Chugye University for the Arts. He was a researcher at Keio University's Institute for Journalism, Media & Communication Studies in Japan. He won the Modern Poetry World New Poet Award in 1991, launching his literary career. After finishing school he worked briefly for the Korean Publishing Journal, before joining Maeil Business News Korea as a journalist. He has since written articles on literature and the publishing industry for the paper's culture section.

Heo's poetry collections include Buronhan geomeun pi (불온한 검은 피 Unruly Black Blood), Nappeun sonyeoni seo itda (나쁜 소년이 서 있다 A Bad Boy Is Standing), Naega wonhaneun cheonsa (내가 원하는 천사 The Angel I Want), and Oship meter (오십 미터 Fifty Meters), while his essay collections include Geu namjaui bibliophily (그 남자의 비블리오필리 That Man's Bibliophily) and Gojeontamnik (고전탐닉 Classics Obsession). He won the Korea Academic Title Award in 2006, the Korea Criticism Award in 2008, the Sijak Literary Award in 2013, and the Hyundae Munhak Award in 2014.

== Writing ==
Heo Yeon's writing style has been described as lonely, beautiful, and sophisticated. His early works have a rebellious character, questioning the notion of salvation and challenging the world. His first poetry collection Buronhan geomeun pi (불온한 검은 피 Unruly Black Blood) looks back on his childhood when he was a "bad boy"—before he reached "the age when I had seen too much of the world" or "the age when crime started to suit me." In the preface of the collection, he writes: "When I became exhausted from trying to escape pain, and when I finally succumbed to the persistence and allure of that pain, I wrote poetry. Bringing together myriads of isolated, non-joyful words—in other words, writing poetry—was for me like meditating in front of a wall or experiencing bliss." The statement suggests Heo's determination to rebel against the world through poetry.

If Heo's first poetry collection focuses on describing his childhood acquaintances using gloomy imagery, his second collection Nappeun sonyeoni seo itda (나쁜 소년이 서 있다 A Bad Boy Is Standing) explores the self-deprecation and malaise of the white-collar worker in the city and reflects on ugliness, wretchedness, dissolution, and futility. In his third collection Naega wonhaneun cheonsa (내가 원하는 천사 The Angel I Want), Heo coolly considers the empty, numbing aspects of life, while seeking positivity in negativity. His fourth collection Oship meter (오십 미터 Fifty Meters) notes the misery of being beaten down by life and how people slowly wear away. He also depicts his life as that of an outsider who does not settle into a routine. Heo captures the lonely landscape of the city and addresses pain directly, thereby constantly pushing his poetic boundaries. But his poetry does not always dwell on gloom and despair. His conversational frankness often has poignant lyricism.

== Works ==
Poetry Collections

1. 《불온한 검은 피》, 세계사, 1995

Unruly Black Blood. Segyesa, 1995.

2. 《나쁜 소년이 서 있다》, 민음사, 2008

A Bad Boy Is Standing. Minumsa, 2008.

3. 《내가 원하는 천사》, 문학과지성, 2012

The Angel I Want. Moonji, 2012.

4. 《오십 미터》, 문학과지성사, 2016

Fifty Meters. Moonji, 2016.

Essay Collections

1. 《그 남자의 비블리오필리》, 해냄, 2008

That Man's Bibliophily. Hainaim, 2008.

2. 《고전탐닉》, 마음산책, 2012.

Classics Obsession. Maumsanchaek, 2012.

== Awards ==
1. 2006: Korea Academic Title Award

2. 2008: Korea Criticism Award

3. 2013: Sijak Literary Award

4. 2014: Hyundae Literary Award
