= Ha Seong-nan =

South Korean writer (born 1967)

- Born: June 28, 1967 (age 59)
- Writing career
- Language: Korean

Korean name
- Hangul: 하성란
- Hanja: 河成蘭
- RR: Ha Seongran
- MR: Ha Sŏngnan

Ha Seong-nan (Korean: 하성란; born 28 June 1967) is a South Korean writer.

== Biography ==
Ha was born in Seoul. She is the oldest of three children and this position resulted in her often taking on the role of a son. Ha wrote through elementary and middle school, with limited success, but began writing short stories in high-school and winning school prizes for them. After graduating from high school Ha worked in a wood-importing firm and entered the Department of Creative Writing at the Seoul Institute of Arts in 1990. After graduation she worked for Moonji Publishing.

During all this time Ha had been writing and she debuted in 1996 with her short story "Grass." She won the prestigious Dong-in Literary Award with her short story "Flowers of Mold," as well as the Hyeondae Literary Award for her story "Alpha's Time." She has also received the Yisu Literary Award the Hankook Ilbo Literary Award, and the Dongin Literary Award.

In 2007, Ha had her second child, a son, and she currently lives in Mapo, Seoul.

== Work ==
The Literature Translation Institute of Korea sums Ha's work up:

Ha Seong-ran (1967~ ) is known for what the critics have termed “microscopic depiction.” Her early works, in particular, provide superb examples of her ability to use words to paint a meticulously detailed and finely nuanced picture of ordinary people and events without being verbose or sentimental. Beyond mere descriptive prowess, however, Ha’s works exhibit the author’s thorough understanding of her subject matter as well as the care with which she examines seemingly mundane and trivial events. Often, she does not rely on direct description of outward appearances or personality traits to visualize a character, but instead weaves a complex picture of memory, expressions, landscapes and surrounding objects that bring a character to life. “Flowers of Mold” features a man who searches through garbage for truth. Each bag of garbage bears a particular signature of the household that produced it, the man believes, but even after examining hundreds of garbage bags, he fails to establish a meaningful relationship with another human being.
In recent years, Ha has shown greater interest in social issues. The First Wife of Blue Beard is a collection of short stories each revolving around a tragic, but familiar incident that could easily appear on the pages of a local newspaper. In the title story modeled after Perrault’s Le Barbe Bleue, a woman who marries a Korean living in New Zealand learns about her husband’s homosexuality; “Flies” portrays a small town policeman’s descent into madness. In Ha’s fiction, such incidents as murder, fire, and robbery are treated without sensationalism: she uses those life-shattering moments in life to underscore fragility of happiness as well as the sense of emptiness that lies at the core of existence.

== Bibliography ==
Novels

- 식사의 즐거움 (1998). The Joy of Meals.
- 삿뽀로 여인숙 (2000). Sapporo Inn.
- 내 영화의 주인공 (2001). The Hero of My Movie.
- A (2010).

Short story collections

- 루빈의 술잔 (1997). Rubin's Vase.
- 옆집 여자 [Yŏpchip yŏja] (1999). The Woman Next Door. Translated by Janet Hong under the title Flowers of Mold (Open Letter, 2019). Contains the short stories (order of stories slightly differs between the original and the translation):
  - 옆집 여자 [Yŏpchip yŏja] The woman next door
  - 깃발 [Kitpal] Flag
  - 악몽 [Angmong] Nightmare
  - 즐거운 소풍 [Chŭlgŏun sop'ung] The retreat
  - 촛농 날개 [Ch'onnong nalgae] Waxen wings
  - 당신의 백미러 [Tangsin ŭi paek mirŏ] Your rearview mirror
  - 곰팡이꽃 [Komp'ang'i kkot] Flowers of mold
  - 치약 [Ch'iyak] Toothpaste
  - 올콩 [Olk'ong] Early beans
  - 양파 [Yangp'a]Onion
- 푸른 수염의 첫 번째 아내 [P'urŭn suyŏm ŭi ch'ŏt pŏntchae anae] (2002). Translated by Janet Hong as Bluebeard's First Wife (Open Letter, 2020). Contains the short stories:
  - 별 모양의 얼룩 [Pyŏl moyang ŭi ŏlluk] The star-shaped stain
  - 푸른수염의 첫번째 아내 [P'urŭn suyŏm ŭi ch'ŏt pŏntchae anae] Bluebeard's first wife
  - 파리 [P'ari] Flies
  - 밤의 밀렵 [Pam ŭi millyŏp] Night poaching
  - 오, 아버지 [O, abŏji] O Father
  - 기쁘다 구주 오셨네 [Kippŭda kuju osyŏnne] Joy to the world
  - 와이셔츠 [Waisyŏch'ŭ] The dress shirt
  - 저 푸른 초원 위에 [Chŏ p'urŭn ch'owŏn wi e] On that green, green grass
  - 고요한 밤 [Koyo han pam] A quiet night
  - 새끼손가락 [Saekki son'garak] 새끼손가락
  - 개망초 [Kaemangch'o] Daisy Fleabane
- 웨하스 (2006). Translated by Janet Hong as Wafers (Open Letter, 2024).
- 여름의 맛 (2013). The Taste of Summer.

Other

- 소망 그 아름다운 힘 (2006). The Beautiful Power of Hope (photos/essays, co-written with photographer Choi Min-sik)
- 아직 설레는 일은 많다 (2013). I Still Have a Lot of Excitement.

Translated short stories in magazines/journals/anthologies

- "Waxen Wings". In Waxen Wings: The Acta Korean Anthology of Short Fiction from Korea (1999).
- "Traversing Afternoon". In Bi-lingual Edition Modern Korean Literature, Vol. 32 (2013).
- "The Star-Shaped Stain". In The Malahat Review, Issue 188 (2014).
- "Joy to the World". In Ricepaper 20.4 (2016).
- "Pinky Finger". In The New Quarterly, Issue 143 (2017).
- "Early Beans". In Korean Literature Now, Vol. 37 (2017).
- "Bluebeard's First Wife". In Asymptote (2018).

== Awards ==
- Dong-in Literary Award (1999 - "Flowers of Mold")
- Hankook Ilbo Literary Award (2000 - "Joy to the World")
- Isu Literary Award (2004)
- Oh Yeong-su Literary Award (2008)
- Contemporary Literature (Hyundae Munhak) Award (2009)
