= Oh Sangwon =

South Korean writer and journalist (1930–1985)

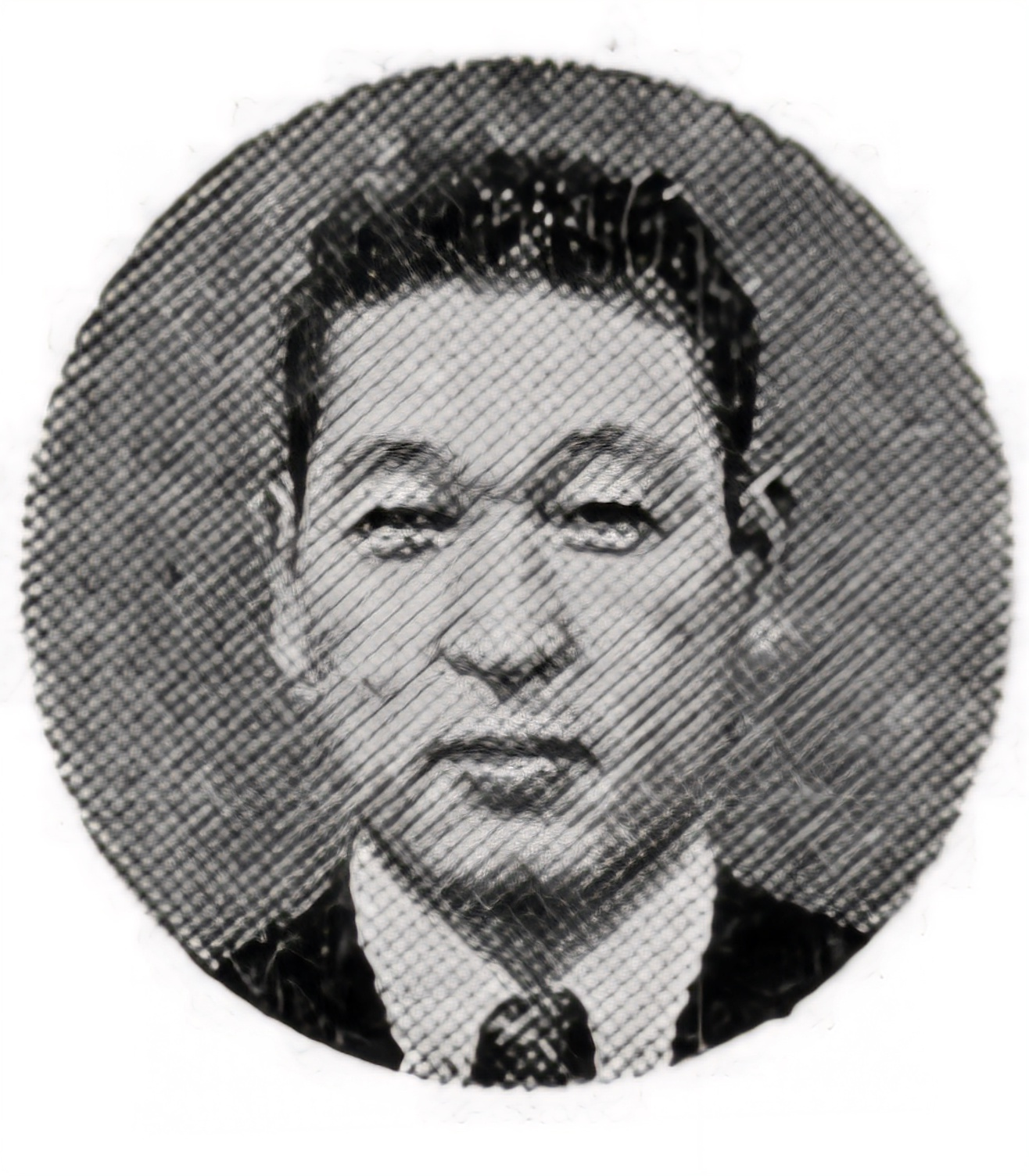
- Born: November 5, 1930; Sonchon, Pyonganbuk-do
- Died: December 3, 1985 (aged 55)
- Education: B.A.
- Alma mater: Seoul National University
- Writing career
- Language: Korean
- Period: 1953-1985

Korean name
- Hangul: 오상원
- RR: O Sangwon
- MR: O Sangwŏn

Oh Sangwon (Korean: 오상원) was a South Korean writer and journalist.

== Life ==
Oh Sangwon was born on November 5, 1930, in Seoncheon, Pyeonganbuk-do, Korea. Oh graduated from Seoul National University with a B.A. in French and worked as an editorial writer for the Dong-a Ilbo. Oh died in 1985.

In 1953, his play Corroding Fragments (Nokseuneun papyeon) won the Association for New Theater (Singeuk hyeobuihoe) contest. Oh debuted as a writer in 1955 when his short story "A Respite" (Yuye) was published in the Hankook Ilbo.

== Work ==
The Literature Translation Institute of Korea summarizes Oh's contributions to Korean literature:

French behaviorism and existentialism, which he encountered in college, strongly influenced Oh Sangwon’s literary imagination. His works bear witness to the political chaos following the liberation and the tragedy of Korean War through characters that take bold actions to critique external reality. “A Betrayal” (Moban), a story that won him 1958 Dongin Literary Prize features a terrorist who must choose between his conscience and his duty to his political organization. “A Respite” presents a psychological study of a soldier taken captive while trying to save another man’s life and is awaiting execution. The soldier can be taken as a prototype of a superhuman, behavioristic man who makes humanistic choice even as he confronts his own mortality. “Period” (Pirieodeu), “Reality” (Hyeonsil), and “Contempt” (Momyeol) further explore the subject of Korean War.

In the 1970s, he shifted his attention away from creative writing to focus on a career in journalism, working as a reporter and editorialist for the Dong-a Ilbo. During this time, he published fabular satires of contemporary events. Political and social fables such as “The Old Fox” (Neulgeun yeou), “The King's Molar” (Imgeumnimui eogeumni), and “The Rabbit's Eyes” (Tokkiui nun) are collected in Oh Sangwon’s Fables (Oh Sangwon uhwa). In the 1980s, he published semi-autobiographical short stories such as “Mountains” (San) and “The Overlapping Past” (Gyeopchin gwageo). He died on December 3, 1985.

== Works in translation ==
- A Respite in A Respite and other Korean Short Stories

== Works in Korean (partial) ==
Novels

- Records on White Papers (1958)

Short Stories

- A Betrayal
- A Respite
- Period
- Reality
- Contempt
- Mountains
- The Overlapping Past

Fables

- Oh Sanwon's Fables

== Awards ==
- Dong-in Literary Award (1958)
