= Chung So-sung =

South Korean writer (1944–2020)

- Born: February 11, 1944; Bonghwa County, Keishōhoku-dō, Korea, Empire of Japan
- Died: October 24, 2020 (aged 76); Seoul, South Korea
- Education: Seoul National University
- Occupation: Novelist
- Writing career
- Language: Korean
- Period: 1977–2020
- Genre: Novel
- Notable works: The Ship Bound for Athens; The Hot River

Korean name
- Hangul: 정소성
- Hanja: 鄭昭盛
- RR: Jeong Soseong
- MR: Chŏng Sosŏng

Chung So-sung (Korean: 정소성; 11 February 1944 – 24 October 2020) was a writer from South Korea.

== Life ==
Chung So-sung was born in Bonghwa, Keishōhoku-dō (North Gyeongsang Province), Korea, Empire of Japan on 11 February 1944. He received his bachelor's and master's degrees in French literature from Seoul National University. He then received his doctorate in French literature from the University of Grenoble III in France. From 1985 until 2009 he was the French literature professor at Dankook University's college of liberal arts. In 1977, when Chung was the French literature professor at Chonnam University's college of education, he made his literary debut with the publication of his story "Jilju" (질주 Rush) in Hyundae Munhak. Toward the end of his study abroad in France, he published the novel Cheonnyeoneul naerineun nun (천년을 내리는 눈 The Snow of Thousand Years) in 1983. After he published Atene ganeun bae (아테네 가는 배 The Ship Bound for Athens) in early 1985, he won the Dongin Literary Award. Hwang Sun-won, who was the judge for the award, has said the following of the story: "It is a great harvest to have gotten this work, which allowed us to profoundly reaffirm the pain of our division to the world."

Chung published 5 short story collections including Tteugeo-un gang (뜨거운 강 The Hot River), and 14 novels including Yeojaui seong (여자의 성 The Sex of Women), Daedongyeojido (대동여지도 Daedongyeojido, 5 Volumes), Taeyangin (태양인 The Sun People, 2 Volumes), Du anae (두 아내 Two Wives), and Seolhyang (설향). In the same year he was awarded the Dongin Literary Award, he also won the Yun Dongju Literature Award. In recognition of his career, he was awarded the Bonghwa Artist Award in 2015 from his hometown Bonghwa.

== Writing ==
The novella Atene ganeun bae (아테네 가는 배 The Ship Bound for Athens), which won the 17th Dongin Literary Award, is a work of historical fiction about the division of Korea, exploring themes of mystification and the relation of fate to suffering.

His novel Du anae (두 아내 Two Wives, 2 Volumes), deals with themes of trauma and historical division through the story of Han Cheol-wu, who had married in North Korea, but is separated from his first wife by the Korean War, and eventually marries again in South Korea. This novel, which demonstrates a fluent command of the dialects of Hamgyong-do, Pyongan-do, and Gyeongsang-do, was selected by the Literature Translation Institute of Korea as the only work to be translated into French in 1999.

Chung's has published several other other works that are inspired by Korean history, such as Daedongyeojido (대동여지도 Daedongyeojido, 5 Volumes), which depicts the story of Kim Jeong-ho, a Silhak scholar of the Joseon dynasty, as well as Taeyangin (태양인 The Sun People, 2 Volumes), which tells the story of Lee Jema, a scholar, military officer, and doctor of the late Joseon period, and the origin of Sasang typology. Taeyangin (태양인 The Sun People, 2 Volumes) was once officially optioned by MBC for a TV series.

== Works ==
=== Short story collections ===
- Atene ganeun bae (아테네 가는 배 The Ship Bound for Athens), Dongsuh Books, 1986.
- Tteugeo-un gang (뜨거운 강 The Hot River), Dong-A Publishing, 1988.
- Ta-inui siseon (타인의 시선 The Gaze of Others), Chungrim, 1988.
- Honhyeolui ttang (혼혈의 땅 The Land of the Mixed-Blood), Chinwu, 1990.
- Byeorange maedalin sanae (벼랑에 매달린 사내 The Man Hanging From the Cliff), Dong-A Publishing, 1991.

=== Novels ===
- Cheonnyeoneul naerineun nun (천년을 내리는 눈 The Snow of Thousand Years), Jungumsa, 1983.
- Akyeongui jib (악령의 집 The House of Demons), Goryeowon, 1989.
- Yeojaui seong (여자의 성 The Sex of Women), Segye Ilbo, 1990.
- Angae naerineun gang (안개 내리는 강 The Foggy River, 2 Volumes), Open Books, 1990.
- Garima tan yeoin (가리마 탄 여인 The Woman With Parted Hair, 2 Volumes), Chosun Ilbo, 1991.
- Jebikkot (제비꽃 Violet), Jayu Munhaksa, 1992.
- Choehu-ui yeonin (최후의 연인 The Last Lover), Goryeowon, 1993.
- Sarangui wonjoe (사랑의 원죄 The Original Sin of Love, 2 Volumes), JoongAng Ilbo, 1994.
- Daedongyeojido (대동여지도 Daedongyeojido, 5 Volumes), Jayu Munhaksa, 1994.
- Unmyeong (운명 Destiny), Byeokseojeong, 1996.
- Taeyangin (태양인 The Sun People, 2 Volumes), Yolimwon, 1997.
- Du anae (두 아내 Two Wives, 2 Volumes), Chanseom Publishing, 1999.
- Baramui yeoin (바람의 여인 The Woman of the Wind), Silcheon Munhak, 2005.
- Seolhyang (설향), Poem and Essay, 2012.

=== Works in translation ===
- Les deux épouses (French)

== Awards ==
- 17th Dongin Literary Award (1985)
- 1st Yun Dongju Literature Award (1985)
- 1st Manwu Park Young-joon Literary Prize (1988)
- 29th Woltan Literature Award (1995)
- 8th Muksa Ryu Juhyeon Literary Prize (2012)
