= Song Giwon =

South Korean novelist (1947–2024)

- Born: 1 July 1947; Boseong County, South Jeolla Province, South Korea
- Died: 31 July 2024 (aged 77)
- Writing career
- Language: Korean

Korean name
- Hangul: 송기원
- Hanja: 宋基元
- RR: Song Giwon
- MR: Song Kiwŏn

Song Giwon (Korean: 송기원; 1 July 1947 – 31 July 2024) was a South Korean novelist, who won several awards, and was arrested for suspected treason.

== Biography ==
Song Giwon was born on 1 July 1947, in the Choseong Township of Boseong County, Jeollanam-do, in South Korea. In 1966, while a student at Joseon High School, his poem “Field of Flowers” (Kkotbat) was chosen for a prize in a nationwide writing contest for high school students sponsored by Korea University. Later his poem “Song of the Wind” (Baramui norae) was chosen in a similar contest put on by the Sorabol College of Arts, and in 1967 his poem “On a Sleepless Night” (Bulmyeonui bame) won a prize in the spring literary contest held by the Chonnam Daily newspaper. In 1968, due to the outcome of the contest, he entered Sorabol College of Arts.

His personal life was more tangled. Song Gi-weon was reared from early boyhood by a step-father following his parents’ divorce. His biological father, an alcoholic and opium addict, lay down on railroad tracks in a state of drunkenness and lost his life when Song was just 18. As an unsettled youngster, Song often got into trouble for fighting with his classmates, but he was also a consistent winner at annual literary composition contests, and his literary talent was recognized at a young age. While maintaining a self- deprecatory view of himself as one having “bad blood”, Song's younger years were fueled by his strong desire to be a professional writer.

Song Giwon volunteered for service in the Vietnam War in 1970, but was struck by malaria and was sent home after his hospital stay. Song characterizes his Vietnam experience as a self-destructive time in his life when he put himself at death's doorway. After surviving his brush with death, he began writing poems and novels in 1974. At the early stage of his writing career, he began focusing his attention on Korea's oppressive political situation. His self-destructive instinct re-emerged at this time as “resistance.” During the late 1970s, he employed his writing talents as a leading figure in the “Declaration of the National Political Situation.” Then, in 1980, he was imprisoned for some time for his involvement in the Gim Daejung (then an opposition party leader) Incident. Afterwards, he helped plan and publish several progressive journals (Silcheon munhak, Minjung Gyoyuk, Nodong munhak, etc.) and acted as a leader in the democratization and people's movements, for which he was arrested and imprisoned several times. This temporarily halted his writing

Starting in the 1990s, Song was able to return solely to creative writing. Following his travels to India and Myanmar in 1997, he became enraptured with Buddhism and turned to writing about Buddhist themes and self- observation. He has also been an active poet.

Song died from complications of a stroke on 31 July 2024, at the age of 77.

== Work ==
The Wolmunli series of poems written at the beginning of Song Giwon's career affirms the vast distance between peasants and intellectuals and follows the process of discovering the wisdom hidden in the lives of the former. From the perspective of a first-person observer, the author portrays the social conditions of peasants and underscores labor as the mediating activity between man and nature. In doing so he confirms the power of land and explores the possibilities for a connection between intellectuals and peasants.

“At Wolmunli, IV” (Wolmunlieseo IV) contains a scenes at its end in which an old man from North Korea, Cho Mandol, who displays no interest in politics even when the entire nation is clamoring about reuniting separated families, unexpectedly decides to go in search of his younger brother. This last scene is particularly impressive, in that is successfully captures the lives of the peasants and their hard-bred wisdom, both of which sustain themselves without break during the most turbulent of times. Song writes that their lives are "the hardest sort of earth, and an enormous and mysterious force in that earth which pushes upward to rise through the cracks it will make and the holes it will bore without regard for rock or the sharp edges of hoes or blades of shovels." In “Again at Wolmunli”, the conclusion of the Wolmunli series, the scene in which the protagonist, in prison, hears of his mother's death is repeatedly juxtaposed with the scene of his visit to her grave until the two are brought to an end with the protagonist's conviction that he 'will not live as easily as mother'. The protagonist's appreciation and understanding of his mother, and his own self-revelations at the end of the poem-cycle combine to produce a highly affecting and memorable piece. Song's most recent work, Come to Me, I Will Gladly Go to You (Neoege gama naege ora) is set in a marketplace and portrays the great pains of the common people in their search for love and hope. Although their lives are tainted by despair, insanity, and violence, the author convincingly portrays their corrupt behavior as arising not from a corrupt nature, but from their desolation. Song's lyrical style is here particularly effective in portraying their grotesque lives as possessing a shimmering, haunting beauty.

== Works in translation ==
- Meditation über Frauen (여자에 관한 명상)

== Works in Korean (partial) ==
Novels

- Poems of a Nineteen-year Old (1978)
- Wolhaeng (1979)
- Wolmunni Again

Collections of Poetry

- When Your Frozen Flesh Splits to Light up Poems (1984)
- Red Flower Leaves in One's Hear (1990)

== Awards ==
- Joongang Ilbo Literature Award for Short Stories (1974)
- Dong-a Ilbo Literature Prize for Poetry (1974)
- Shin Tong-yop Writing Fellowship (1974)
- Dong-in Literary Award (1993)
