= Mah Chonggi =

Korean poet (born 1939)

- Born: January 17, 1939 (age 87); Tokyo, Japan
- Citizenship: South Korean
- Education: Yonsei University, Seoul National University
- Occupation: Poet
- Writing career
- Language: Korean

Korean name
- Hangul: 마종기
- Hanja: 馬鍾基
- RR: Ma Jonggi
- MR: Ma Chonggi

Mah Chonggi is a Korean poet.

== Life ==
Mah was born in Tokyo, Japan on January 17, 1939. He graduated from medical schools at Yonsei University and Seoul National University. After finishing his graduate research at Seoul National University in 1966, he went to the United States. He taught at Ohio State University Medical School and practice radiology in Toledo, Ohio. He retired from the medical field and professorial duties in 2002, and turned his attention entirely to writing poetry.

== Work ==
The major themes in the poems of Mah are his experience as a doctor and his life abroad in Japan and especially America. The pieces marked by his medical experiences express profound compassion and hope for the ability of love to negate pain. His works dealing with life in foreign countries tend to be more complex in tone; in them he writes of his recollections of his life in Korea and the various conflicting feelings: intense patriotism, love and anger toward his fellow Koreans, and shames that stem from his reflections on his homeland. Both themes ultimately inspire the same compassion for humanity, whether for the suffering or for the uprooted, and attain a universality that has become Mah's trademark.

== Works in Translation ==
- Augen aus Tau (우리는 서로 부르고 있는 것일까)
- Invisible Land of Love: Poems of Chonggi Mah. Translated by Youngshil Cho. Homa & Sekey Books, 2022.

== Works in Korean (Partial) ==
Poetry

- Quiet Triumphant Return (Joyonghan gaeseon),
- Second Winter (Du beonjjae gyeoul)
- Invisible World of Love (Anboineun sarangui nara)
- The Shine from the Sky of the World" (Geu nara haneulbit),
- Moyeoseo saneun geosi eodi galdaedeul ppunirya"
- Eyes of Dew (Iseurui nun).

== Awards ==
- Korean Literary Writers' Awards (1976)
- Contemporary Literature (Hyundae Munhak) Award (2009)
