= Jeon Sang-guk =

South Korean writer (born 1940)

- Born: March 24, 1940 (age 86); Kōgen-dō, Korea, Empire of Japan
- Citizenship: South Korean
- Education: B.A. and M.A. in Korean literature
- Alma mater: Kyunghee University
- Writing career
- Language: Korean

- Jeon Sang-guk
- Hangul: 전상국
- Hanja: 全商國
- RR: Jeon Sangguk
- MR: Chŏn Sangguk

Jeon Sang-guk (Korean: 전상국; born March 24, 1940) is a South Korean writer known for his masculine writing style.

== Life ==
Jeon Sang-guk was born on March 24, 1940, in Kōgen-dō (Gangwon Province), Korea, Empire of Japan. Jeon graduated from Kyunghee University with a B.A. and M.A. in Korean literature. He worked, for many years, as a High School teacher and then as a professor of Korean Literature at Kangwon University.

== Work ==
Jeon Sang-guk drew on his personal experiences in the Korean War and the ensuing division of the country to reconfirm the tragic consequences of these events. For Jeon, however, the real suffering is not in the War itself but in its aftermath, in the families ripped apart and the homes lost; and often, the War provides an opportunity to capture the drama of conflict and confrontation that exists in traditional human relationships. In Ah-be's Family, the wounds left by the war are symbolized by a mentally disabled child of rape, abandoned by his mother, who immigrates to the U.S. with her new family. The guilt-ridden mother, however, fails to find peace in the new land. The tragedy, therefore, is not only found in the rape and its by-product, the handicapped child, but also in consequence of the attempt to escape the traumatic memories of it. Jeon's serial novel, "The Road" (Gil), further investigates the aftermath of the war through the problem of isan gajok or families separated by the war and the division. In the 1980s, Jeon Sang Guk, who worked for a long time as a schoolteacher, expanded the scope of his literary topic to include problems in education. His stories "The Tears of an Idol" (Usangui nunmul), "The Squealing of Piglets" (Doeji saekkideurui ureum) and "The Eye of the Darkness" (Eumjiui nun) take the confined space of the school as a microcosmic setting, and explore the problematic relationships between teachers and students, as well as among the students themselves as they correlate to the similar issues in society at large.

== Works in Translation ==
- Ahbes Familie (전상국 단편선-아베의 가족)
- La familia de Abe (전상국 단편선-아베의 가족)

== Works in Korean (Partial) ==
Short Story Collections

- The Restless Village (Baram nan maeul, 1977)
- That Place Beneath Heaven (Haneul arae geu jari, 1979)
- Tears of an Idol (1980)
- Ah-be's Family (1980)
- Our Wings (Urideurui nalgae, 1981)
- The House of Punishment (Hyeongbeorui jip, 1987)
- Father (Aebi, 1966).

== Awards ==
- Contemporary Literature (Hyundae Munhak) Award (1977)
- Korean Literature Writers Award (1979),
- Dong-in Literary Award (1980)
- Korean Literature Award(1980)
- Yoon Dongju Literature Prize (1988)
- Kim Yujeong Literature Prize (1988)
