= Jung Chan (author) =

South Korean writer (born 1953)

- Born: July 3, 1953 (age 73)
- Education: Seoul National University
- Writing career
- Language: Korean

Korean name
- Hangul: 정찬동
- RR: Jeong Chandong
- MR: Chŏng Ch'andong

Pen name
- Hangul: 정찬
- Hanja: 鄭贊
- RR: Jeong Chan
- MR: Chŏng Ch'an

Jung Chan (Korean: 정찬; born 1953) is a South Korean writer.

== Life ==
Jung Chan was born in 1953 and graduated from Seoul National University with a degree in Korean Education. He debuted in 1983 when his novella The Tower of Language (Marui tap) was published in The World of Language. Jung is a popular artist, having appeared at LTI Korea 2010 Seoul International Writers' Festival under the theme "Fantasy + Empathy".

== Work ==
Jung was profoundly influenced by the Gwangju Uprising, which occurred while he was working as a reporter for The Dong-A Ilbo. What intrigued Jung was not so much the political issue, but the issues of men confronting death and redemption. In Perfect Soul (Wanjeonhan yeonghon), barbarity of those in power is contrasted against the simplicity and passivity of innocent souls.

Another concern in Jung's work is the relationship between power and language. The power here is the end product of the corruption of language or language turned ideological. Jung's Ice House (Eoreumui jip) and Song of Sadness (Seulpeumui norae) offer a careful meditation upon the language of novels and Owl focuses on the tension between God's silence and the language of corrupt power. In Ice House (Eoreumui jip), what the powerful pursues so relentlessly is ultimately identified as the place of God. While delving into the interchange between the essence and the manifestations of essence, Jung also investigates the problem of fictional language revealed in the novel itself. For this reason, his work is often seen as occupying a middle ground between poetics and novels.

== Works in translation ==
- The Cozy Path (아늑한 길)

== Works in Korean (partial) ==
Novels

- The Evening of the World (1998)
- Gold Ladder (1999)
- Under the Broom Tree (1999)
- A Shadow Soul (2000)
- Short Story Collections
- The River of Memory (1989)
- A Perfect Soul (1992)
- Cozy Road (1995)
- Dead in Venice (2003)

== Awards ==
- Dong-in Literary Award
