= Han Su-san =

South Korean writer (born 1946)

Han Soosan
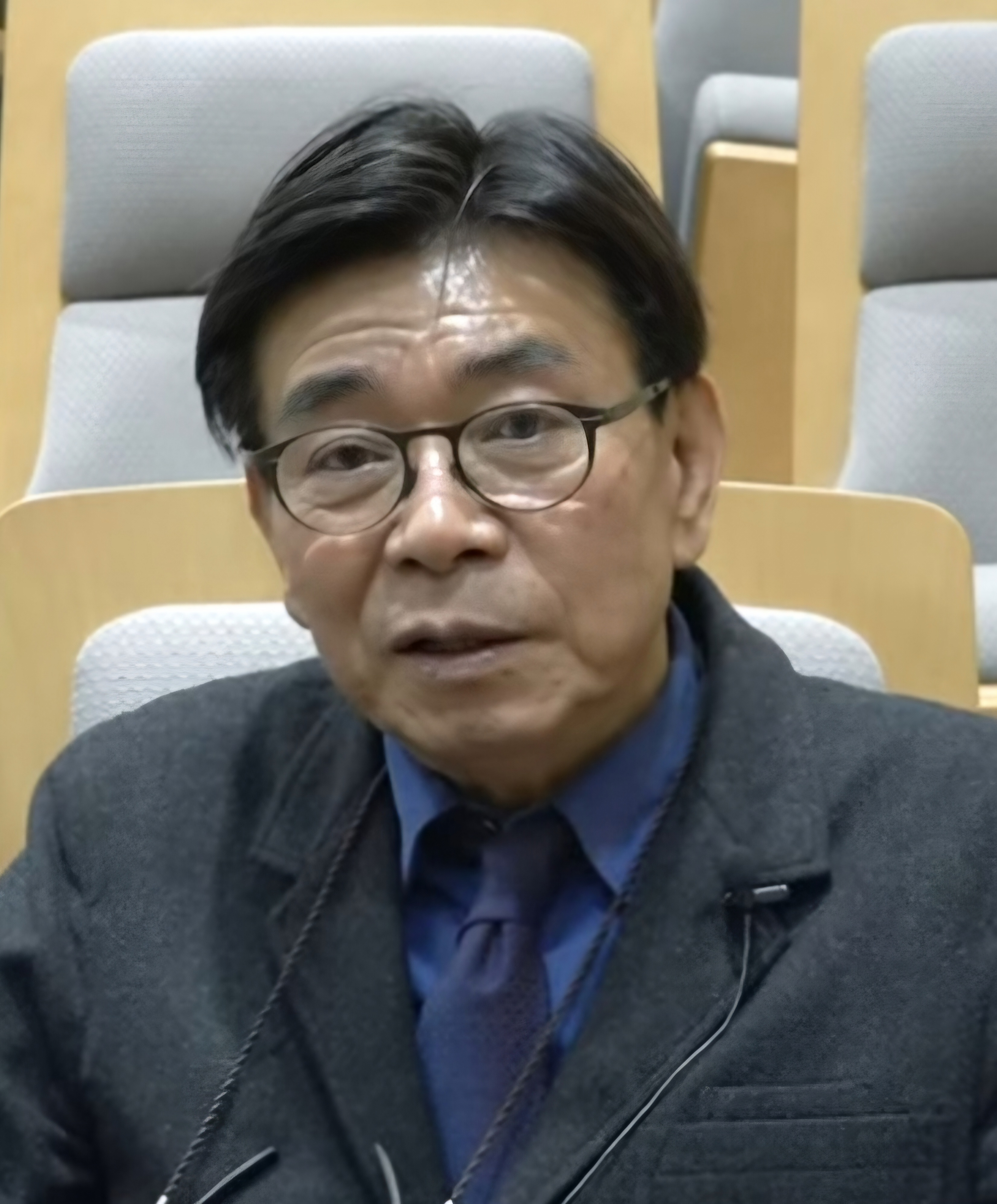
- Born: November 13, 1946 (age 79)
- Writing career
- Language: Korean

- Korean name
- Hangul: 한수산
- Hanja: 韓水山
- RR: Han Susan
- MR: Han Susan

Han Soosan
- Born: November 13, 1946 (age 79)
- Occupation: Novelist
- Writing career
- Period: 1946-present

Han Soosan (born 1946) (Korean: 한수산) is a South Korean writer.

== Early years ==
Born on November 13, 1946, in Inje, Gangwan-do, Han Soosan graduated from Chuncheon High School and initially went to college at the Chuncheon College of Education in 1965, from which he transferred to Kyunghee University, where he graduated with a degree in Korean Literature. A key moment in Han's life was in 1981 when he contributed to a serialized novel that satirized then Korean president Chun Doo-hwan. Han, as well as other newspaper workers, was rounded up and tortured by the government. In 1998, he moved to Japan for four years, where he wrote several stories about Korean residents of Japan. Han teaches Korean Literature at Sejong University.

== Work ==
Han Soosan is known in Korea for his delicate and expressive writing style. Han made his debut as a poet and began publishing works of fiction in the early 1970s. In 1972 his short story "The End of April" won the Dong-a Daily literary contest. He also won the Korea Daily prize in 1973 for his novel "A Morning in the Season of Reconciliation," and in 1977 won the "Today's Writer Prize" for his work "Floating Weeds." In 1984 he won the Nogwon Literature Prize and in 1991 the Contemporary Literature Prize. Han calls his novel Raven his "life's work." It is a multi-volume epic following the lives of Korean men conscripted by the Japanese during the colonial era. It has not been translated into English.

=== Works in Translation ===
- Floating Grass (Dong-suh-Mu Seoul, 1990; translated by Kim Seong-Kon)
- Ende einer Vorstellung (Pendragon, 1999)
- لعشب العائم (부초) (카이로대학 출판부, 2006)
- 軍艦島 (까마귀) (作品社, 2009)

=== Works in Korean (Partial) ===
- The Morning of the Thawing Season (Haebing-gi-ui Achim, 1973)
- Floating Grass (Bucho, 1977)
- The End of April (Sawol-ui Kkeut 1978)
- The Street of Desire (Yonmang-ui Geori, 1981)
- A Street Musician (Geori-ui Aksa, 1986)
- The Wooden Horse that Went to Sea (Bada-ro Gan Mokma, 1989)
- A Horserider Passeth (Maltan Ja-neun Jingada, 1998)

=== Awards ===
- Nogwon Literature Prize (1984)
- Contemporary Literature (Hyundae Munhak) Award (1991)
