= Lee Hye-gyeong =

South Korean writer (1960–2026)

- Born: 16 June 1960; Boryeong, South Chungcheong Province, South Korea
- Died: 20 February 2026 (aged 65)
- Writing career
- Language: Korean

Korean name
- Hangul: 이혜경
- Hanja: 李惠敬
- RR: I Hyegyeong
- MR: I Hyegyŏng

Lee Hye-gyeong (Korean: 이혜경; 16 June 1960 – 20 February 2026) was a South Korean writer who published three collections of works and received multiple awards.

== Background ==
In her first year of university, Lee was exposed to national political controversies including pictures from the 1980 Kwangju massacre, which caused her to drop out of college in 1985 to disguise herself as a worker and go to a factory. She began to read voraciously, debate social issues, and build a personal national consciousness.

Lee taught high school for two years before making her literary debut.

She often travelled to remote and underdeveloped parts of the world, and served as a volunteer worker in Indonesia for two years.

Lee died on 20 February 2026, at the age of 65.

== Work ==
Lee was still considered an author in the new generation of women writers, whose careers were still evolving. Lee believed that she could not write a single sentence about something she had not personally experienced and felt in the deepest core of her being. Her dependency on real experiences, which explains the small volume of her literary output, may be seen as an indication of a master craftsman or an amateurish approach towards writing; regardless of how she is viewed, however, Lee wrote with utmost care and polish. Thematically, Lee's works center on families in different stages of disintegration. Although she was a feminist writer deeply interested in women's place in family and in society, Lee also departed significantly from the stereotypical feminist perspective of gender dichotomy. The fathers in her works are the oppressors as well as the oppressed, who are powerless against their own “father figures”— society, tradition and conventions that crush them as much as they crush others. In this sense, women and men share the common burden of societal oppression.

== Works in translation ==
- A House on the Road (길 위의 집)

== Works in Korean (partial) ==
- A House on the Road (1995)
- In Front of That House (1998)
- Hilltop (2001)

== Awards ==
- 1995 – Today's Writer Award for A House on the Road
- 2000 – Korea Daily Literature Prize for In Front of That House
- 2002 – Contemporary Literature (Hyundae Munhak) Award for Hilltop
- 2006 – Dong-in Literary Award for The Gap
