= Flame (Sunwoo novel) =

1957 novel by Seonu Hwi

Flowers of Fire (Korean: 불꽃) is a Korean anti-communist novel by Seonu Hwi, in 1957.

== Characters ==
- Old man Go (고 노인): very conservative old man. He always takes care of Hyun, his grandson, but is primarily interested in ancestral graveyard and topography.
- Yunho (연호): Communist, who unsuccessfully attempts to alter Hyun's ideology. Instead he takes hostage Hyun's Grandfather, Old man Go.
- Hyun (현): Main character of the novel. Always shows passive action. He steals Communist element's gun and runs away to a cave. Once there, Hyun awakes the 'Flame of Life' (생명의 불꽃), and decides to live properly.
- Hyun's Father (현의 아버지): When Hyun was young, he did Korean Independence Movement. However, he is killed by Japanese soldiers.
- Hyun's Mother (현의 어머니): Sincere Christian. She subjugates her pain to take care of Hyun.
- Aoyama (아오야마): Hyun's only Japanese friend. Later Day, Aoyama volunteer for Imperial away, he gave some potatoes to Hyun.
- Teacher Cho (조 선생): She and her father run away from North Korea under Communist rule, because her father rejects the control of communist party. Later, she sees Communist elements kill her father.
- Professor Tanaka (타나카 교수):

== Awards ==
Flowers of Fire won the Dong-in Literary Award (동인 문학상) in 1957.

== English Translation ==
"Flowers of Fire" appears in the anthology Flowers of Fire.

== Books ==
Seonu Hwi's novels have been well reviewed. They include:

- Bullgot (불꽃): Minuem-sa (민음사), ISBN 978-89-374-2021-4
- Bullgot - Sun U-Hwi; Danpyun-sun (불꽃 - 선우휘 단편선): Munhak-gwa Jisung sa (문학과 지성사), ISBN 978-89-320-1687-0
- Sun U-Hwi Jakpyun-sun (선우휘 작편선): Jimanji (지만지), ISBN 978-89-6406-314-9
