= Lee Seung-u =

South Korean writer (born 1959)

- Born: 21 February 1959 (age 67); Jangheung County, South Jeolla Province, South Korea
- Occupation: Novelist

Korean name
- Hangul: 이승우
- Hanja: 李承雨
- RR: I Seungu
- MR: I Sŭngu

Lee Seung-u (Korean: 이승우, born 21 February 1959) is a South Korean writer.

== Life ==
Lee Seung-u was born in Jangheung, Jeollanam-do in 1959. Lee Seung-u graduated from Seoul Theological University and studied at Yonsei University Graduate School of Theology. One of the outstanding writers to have emerged in South Korea after the political repression of the 1980s, he is today professor of Korean Literature at Chosun University.

Lee's literary career started with his novel A Portrait of Erysichton, which was triggered by his shock at the assassination attempt of Pope Paul II in 1981. This work received the New Writers Award from Korean Literature Monthly. In 1993 Lee's The Reverse Side of Life was awarded the 1st Daesan Literary Award and he has also received he East West Literature Prize for I Will Live Long, the Contemporary Literature Award for Fiction and the Hwang Sun-won Literary Award. In 2021, he won Yi Sang Literary Award, one of the most prestigious Korean literary awards.

== Career ==
In Portrait of Erysichton, In the Shadow of Thorny Bushes, and The Reverse Side of Life, Lee Seung-u focuses on the notion of Christian redemption and how it intersects with human life, demonstrating how tension between heaven and earth are revealed in quotidian life. Other works, including A Conjecture Regarding Labyrinth and To the Outside of the World face up to disillusionment pursuant to the corruption and devaluation of language.

Jean-Marie Gustave Le Clezio, the 2008 Nobel Prize in Literature laureate, has a deep affection for Korean literature. During his year-long stay in Korea as a visiting professor at Ewha Womans University in Seoul, he held book readings with Korean authors on several occasions. At the press conference after the Nobel Prize Award Ceremony, he stated that “Korean literature is quite worthy of the Nobel Literature Prize,” and that “Personally, I would say that Lee Seung-u is one of the likely Korean candidates for the prize.”

Among Lee Seung-u's works, only full-length novels have been translated into English and French, although he has published a great number of short story collections in the past three decades, due in part to the climate of the Korean literary world in which a writer's capacity is evaluated mostly through short stories published in literary journals.

== Works ==
=== Works in translation ===
- Die Ruckseite des Lebens (Horlemann, 1996)
- The Reverse Side of Life (Peter Owen Publishers, 2005)
- La vida secreta de las plantas (Ermitano, 2010)
- 植物たちの私生活 (藤原書店, 2012)
- Тайная жизнь растений (Hyperion, 2013)
- Magnolia Park (ASIA Publishers, 2013)
- Ici comme ailleurs (Éditions Gallimard, 2013)
- Prywatne Życie Roślin (Kwiaty Orientu, 2016)

=== Works in Korean (partial) ===
==== Novels ====
- A Portrait of Erysichton (Erysichton-ui chosang 1981)
- In the Shadow of Thorny Bushes
- Warm Rain (Ttatteuthan bi)
- Gold Mask (Hwanggeumgamyeon)
- The Reverse Side of Life (Saeng-ui imyeon 1992)
- The Private Life of Plants (2000)
- The Old Diary (2008)
- The Gaze of Meridian (2009)
- The Song of the Ground (2012)

==== Short story collections ====
- Mr. Koo Pyeongmok's Cockroach (Gu pyeongmok-ssi-ui bakwibeollae 1987)
- About Eclipse
- To the Outside of the World (Sesang bakkeuro 1991)
- A Conjecture Regarding the Labyrinth (Mingung-e dachan 1994)
- Magnolia Park (Mongyeon gong-won 1998)

== Awards ==
- New Writer's Award, given by Korean Literature (1981)
- 1st Daesan Literary Award (1993)
- Dong-seo Literary Prize (2002)
- Lee Hyo-seok Literary Prize (2003)
- Contemporary Literature (Hyundae Munhak) Award (2007)
- Hwang Sun-won Literary Award (2010)
- Dong-in Literary Award (2013)
- Yi Sang Literary Award (2021)

== See also ==
- Korean literature
- List of Korean novelists
