= Sejong University =

Private university in Seoul, South Korea

- 세종대학교
- Authority mark of Sejong University
- Former names: Kyung Sung Humanities Institute (1940–1947); Seoul Women's College of Education (1947–1948); Seoul College of Education for Family and Nursing (1948–1954); Soodo Women's College of Education (1954–1978); Sejong College (1978–1987)
- Motto: Creativitas Servitium (Latin)
- Type: Private research university
- Established: 1940; 86 years ago
- Accreditation: AACSB
- Chairman: Choi Semo
- President: Eom Jong-Hwa
- Faculty: 1,365
- Administrative staff: 375
- Total staff: 1,700
- Students: 20,391
- Undergraduates: 16,634
- Postgraduates: 3,757
- Location: Gwangjin District, Seoul, South Korea; 37°33′03″N 127°04′26″E
- Campus: Urban
- Newspaper: Sejongdae Sinmu
- Colors: Sejong crimson red Sejong gray
- Nickname: SJU
- Website: sejong.ac.kr en.sejong.ac.kr

Korean name
- Hangul: 세종대학교
- Hanja: 世宗大學校
- RR: Sejong daehakgyo
- MR: Sejong taehakkyo

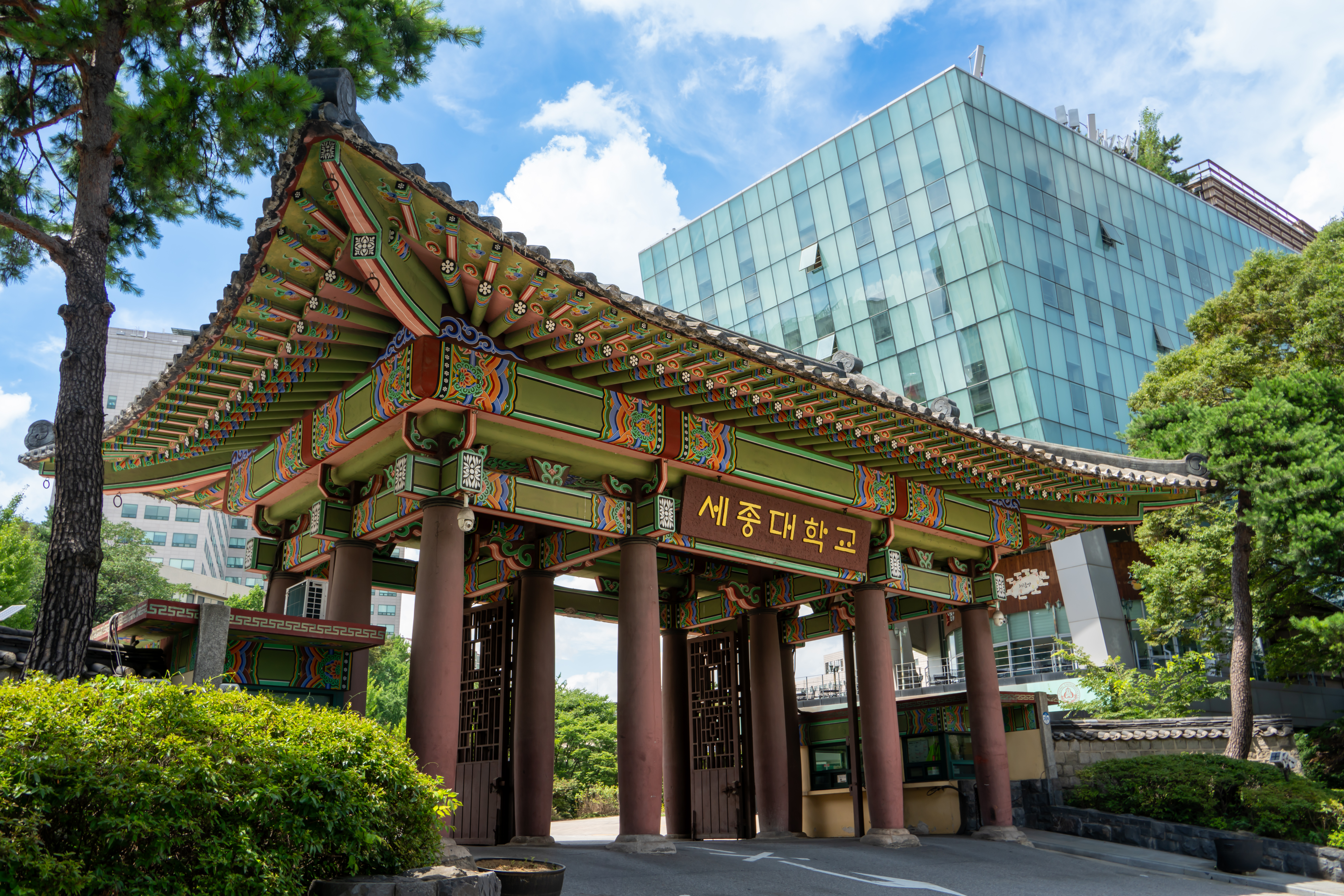
The front gate to the university

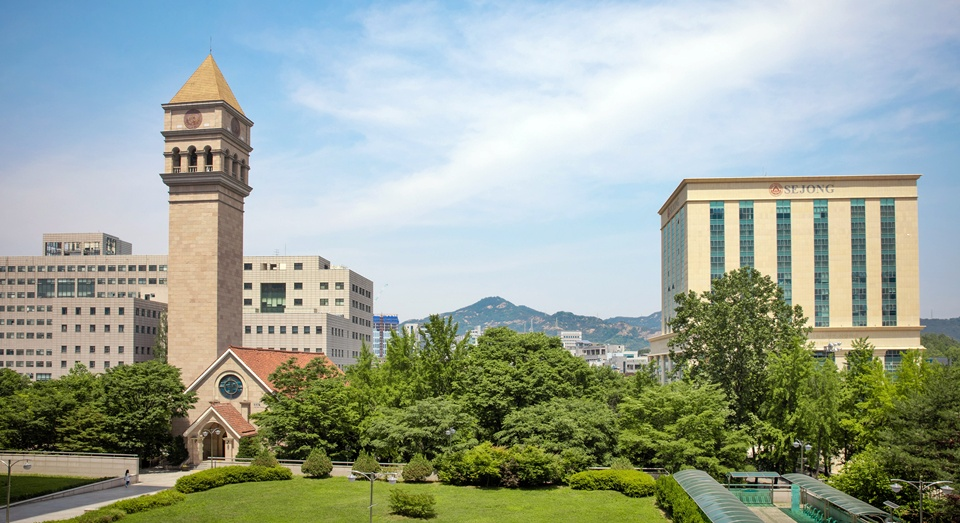
Campus

Sejong University (SJU; Korean: 세종대학교; Hanja: 世宗大學校) is a private research university located in Seoul, South Korea. It is known for its standing in hospitality and tourism management, dancing, animation, rhythmic gymnastics, computer science and AI. Founded as the Kyung Sung Humanities Institute, it was renamed in 1978 to its present name in honor of Sejong the Great, the fourth king of the Joseon Dynasty and overseer of the creation of the Korean alphabet Hangul. Over the years, the university expanded its academic programs and facilities, including the establishment of its main building in 1987 and the Sejong Museum in 1973. It has developed into a comprehensive university, offering a wide range of undergraduate and graduate programs.

== History ==
=== Beginnings (1940–1987) ===
The history of Sejong University began in May 1940 when the Kyung Sung Humanities Institute was founded by Dr. Youngha Choo and Dr. Okja Choi. In 1947 the institute grew into the Seoul Women's College of Education, with Dr. Choo as its first director; the following year it was reorganized and became a junior college. In 1948, the institution was reorganized into the Seoul College of Education for Family and Nursing. In 1954 the school became Soodo Women Teachers' College. The college became a four-year institution in 1961 and in 1962 moved to its present campus in Gunja-dong. In 1966 the Graduate School was established. In 1973, the Soodo Museum (now Sejong University Museum), established to house the founders' collection of Korean antiquities, opened its doors to the public. In 1979 Soodo Women Teachers' College changed its name to Sejong College and admitted male undergraduates for the first time.

=== 1987–2000 ===
In October 1987, Sejong College grew into Sejong University, consisting of five colleges with an enrollment of 6,000 students. In 1996, Dr. Choo Myung-Gun became chairman of the board of trustees. That year saw the establishment of two new graduate schools (the Graduate School of Information and Communication and the Graduate School of Education) and four new engineering departments (Electronic Engineering, Architectural Engineering, Civil Engineering, and the evening division of Computer Engineering), as well as a Ph.D. program in Hotel Management and master's programs in Public Administration, Applied Statistics, and Computer Engineering. Total enrollment rose to over 7,000 by the fall semester of 1997 and since then enrollment has increased by about 1,000 new students each year. In 1998, the College of Tourism and the department of Biological Engineering were founded. Construction began on five new buildings, including the library, the chapel, and the engineering laboratories.

In 1999, three new graduate schools were added: Software Engineering, Science and Technology, and Performance Art Administration. The Materials Engineering department was established.

As a result of a cooperative agreement with Lockheed Martin Aerospace, the Sejong-Lockheed Martin Aerospace Research Center was founded to promote the development of the Korean aerospace industry, and similar agreements to cooperate in the development of science and technology were made with Hanaro Communication, Hansol PCS, Onse Communication, and Prime Company.

In 2000, the Graduate Schools of Film Art and Techno Design were founded; the Graduate School of Business Administration became the Graduate School of Global Business Administration; the College of Tourism became the College of Hotels and Tourism. The new Library opened, housing more than 400,000 volumes; it is the first WTO library in Korea.

=== 2001–present ===
In 2001 a collaborative relationship was established with the Korea Science and Culture Foundation. Two new programs taught in English opened: an M.A program in Asian Studies, and a Global M.B.A. program operated jointly by Sejong University and Syracuse University in the United States. In January 2002 a University Development Advisory Board, composed of the CEOs of 30 major Korean firms, was founded to strengthen the university's ties to industry. In 2002, the education Reform Deliberation Commission officially awarded Sejong University for successfully restructuring and renovating university. In 2004, the Ministry of Education & Human Resources Development recognized Sejong University for excellence in promoting originality, innovation, and academic achievement. In 2007, the Graduate School of Business received certification from the Association of Advanced Collegiate Schools of Business.

== Rankings and recognition ==
University rankings
JoongAng National	Domestic	17
QS National	General	12
THE National	General	8–10
USNWR National	General	3
ARWU National	Research	10–12
QS Asia (Asia version)	General	100
THE Asia (Asia version)	General	=51
USNWR Asia	General	50
ARWU World	Research	401–500
QS World	General	=392
THE World	General	251–300
USNWR World	General	=238

Top 200 colleges and departments in the world (Humanities and Social Sciences)
College·Department	Evaluation agency	Ranking by field
Division of Hospitality, Tourism, and Food Service Management	ARWU	Hospitality & Tourism Management 6th in the world (1st in South Korea)
Division of Hospitality, Tourism, and Food Service Management	QS	Hospitality & Leisure Management 26th in the world (1st in South Korea)
College of Liberal Arts	CWTS	Social Sciences and Humanities 17th in the world (1st in South Korea)
College of Social Sciences	CWTS	Social Sciences and Humanities 17th in the world (1st in South Korea)
College of Social Sciences	USN & WR	Social Sciences and Public Health 154th in the world (1st in South Korea)
College of Social Sciences	THE	Social Sciences 176-200th in the world (2nd in South Korea)
College of Business and Economics	THE	Business and Economics 126-150th in the world (3-4th in South Korea)

Top 200 colleges and departments in the world (Science and Engineering)
College·Department	Evaluation agency	Ranking by field
Dept. of Civil and Environmental Engineering	USN & WR	Water Resources 27th in the world (1st in South Korea)
Dept. of Civil and Environmental Engineering	USN & WR	Civil Engineering 80th in the world (2nd in South Korea)
Dept. of Civil and Environmental Engineering	ARWU	Water Resources 51-75th in the world (1st in South Korea)
Dept. of Civil and Environmental Engineering	ARWU	Civil Engineering 51-75th in the world (3-4th in South Korea)
Dept. of Civil and Environmental Engineering	QS	Civil & Structural Engineering 101-150th in the world (6-7th in South Korea)
Dept. of Mathematics and Statistics	USN & WR	Mathematics 51st in the world (1st in South Korea)
Dept. of Mathematics and Statistics	CWTS	Mathematics and Computer Science 198th in the world (2nd in South Korea)
Dept. of AI and Electronic Convergence Engineering	ARWU	Telecommunication Engineering 51-75th in the world (2nd in South Korea)
Dept. of AI and Electronic Convergence Engineering	USN & WR	Electrical and Electronic Engineering 61st in the world (1st in South Korea)
Dept. of Artificial Intelligence and Robotics	ARWU	Instruments Science & Technology 51-75th in the world (5-6th in South Korea)
Dept. of Environmental Convergence Engineering	USN & WR	Environmental Engineering 81st in the world (1st in South Korea)
Dept. of Environmental Convergence Engineering	USN & WR	Green and Sustainable Science and Technology 108th in the world (1st in South Korea)
Dept. of Environmental Convergence Engineering	USN & WR	Environment/Ecology 164th in the world (2nd in South Korea)
Dept. of Environmental Convergence Engineering	QS	Geophysics 151-200th in the world (3rd in South Korea)
Dept. of Computer Science and Engineering	USN & WR	Computer Science 95th in the world (3rd in South Korea)
Dept. of Computer Science and Engineering	ARWU	Computer Science & Engineering 101-150th in the world (3-5th in South Korea)
Dept. of Computer Science and Engineering	THE	Computer Science 126-150th in the world (4-6th in South Korea)
Dept. of Computer Science and Engineering	QS	Computer Science and Information Systems 190th in the world (8th in South Korea)
Dept. of Computer Science and Engineering	CWTS	Mathematics and Computer Science 198th in the world (2nd in South Korea)
Dept. of AI and Data Science	USN & WR	Artificial Intelligence 98th in the world (4th in South Korea)
Dept. of Nano Technology and Advanced Materials Engineering	ARWU	Metallurgical Engineering 101-150th in the world (5-7th in South Korea)
Dept. of Earth Resources System Engineering	ARWU	Energy Science & Engineering 101-150th in the world (9th in South Korea)
Dept. of Earth Resources System Engineering	USN & WR	Energy and Fuels 157th in the world (7th in South Korea)
College of Engineering	USN & WR	Engineering 106th in the world (3rd in South Korea)
College of Engineering	THE	Engineering 151-175th in the world (9th in South Korea)
Dept. of Mechanical Engineering	ARWU	Mechanical Engineering 151-200th in the world (4-5th in South Korea)

Top 200 colleges and departments in the world (Arts and Physical Education)
College·Department	Evaluation agency	Ranking by field
Dept. of Film Art	QS	Performing Arts 51-100th in the world (1-4th in South Korea)

== Affiliated institutions ==
=== Sejong University Library ===
Established in 1947, the library was renovated as a 12-story building in 2000. It houses 840,000 books, 1,500 journal subscriptions, 20,000 e-journals and 23,000 e-books. It has reading rooms with 3,200 seats and group study areas. It is the first WTO library in Korea.

=== Continuing Education Center ===
The Continuing Education Center complements the education provided by existing universities and offers open and lifelong learning opportunities. It deals with the Sejong Global Program for Studying Abroad, Specialized Program for Casino Dealer Course, Digital Contents, Culinary and Food Service Business, Hotel Business, Physical Education, Music (Piano) and runs a bachelor's degree program based on Academic Credit Bank System.

=== Information Services & Technology Center ===
The Information Services & Technology Center (ITSC) provides information technology support and its related services for all Sejong students, faculty, and staff. Support and services include operation and maintenance of the IT infrastructure such as leading-edge wired and wireless networks, servers, etc., protection of administrative and academic systems and their data, and development and operation of the unified system of the university information technologies.

=== The Sejong International Language Institute ===
Sejong International Language Institute provides language programs for three languages: Korean, English and Chinese. The language programs being offered are Korean language programs at six levels (beginner's, Intermediate and advanced); English as Second language programs (English for Specific Purpose, English for Global Communication skills in Business, and English for Global leaders); Chinese language programs (Chinese Character class and Chinese for Communication skills in Business).

== Academics ==
=== Schools and Major ===
Sejong University has nine colleges: College of Liberal Arts, College of Social Sciences, College of Business & Economics, College of Hospitality and Tourism Management, Faculty of Law, College of Natural Sciences, College of Life Sciences, College of AI Convergence, College of Engineering, College of Arts and Physical Education, features a Faculty of General Education and seven graduate schools.

=== Undergraduate schools ===
- College of Liberal Arts: Korean Language and Literature, English Language and Literature, Japanese Language and Literature, Chinese Trade and Commerce, History, Education
- College of Social Sciences: Public Administration, Media and Communication
- College of Business and Economics: Business Administration, Economics
- College of Hospitality and Tourism Management: Hospitality and Tourism Management, Food Service Management, Franchise Management of Hotel, Restaurant and Tourism, Global Culinary Art and Pastry
- Faculty of Law: Law
- College of Natural Sciences: Mathematics and Statistics, Department of Physics and Astronomy, Chemistry
- College of Life Sciences: Food Science and Biotechnology, Integrative Bioscience and Biotechnology, Bioresources Engineering
- College of AI Convergence: Department of Electrical Engineering, Semiconductor Systems Engineering, Computer Science and Engineering, Computer and Information Security, Software, Department of Artificial Intelligence Data Science, Unmanned Vehicle Engineering, Smart Device Engineering, Artificial Intelligence and Robotics, Innovation Design, Comics and Animation Technology
- College of Engineering: Architectural Engineering, Architecture, Civil and Environmental Engineering, Department of Environment, Energy and Geoinformatics, Energy, Mineral Resources, and Engineering, Mechanical Engineering, Aerospace Engineering, Nanotechnology and Advanced Materials Engineering, Quantum and Nuclear Engineering, Defence Systems Engineering, Aerospace System Engineering
- College of Arts and Physical Education: Painting, Fashion Design, Music, Physical Education, Dance, Film Art

Sejong University also houses the Daeyang Humanity College, a center concerned with liberal arts education.

=== Graduate schools ===
- Graduate School of Sejong University
- Graduate School of Business
- Graduate School of Public Policy
- Graduate School of Education
- Graduate School of Tourism
- Graduate School of Interdisciplinary Arts
- Graduate School of Industry

=== International programs ===
- Exchange Student Programs
- Chinese Trade and Commerce Major - Dual Degree Program (Shanghai Jiao Tong University, China)
- Japanese Language and Literature Major - Study Abroad Program (Yokohama National University, Japan)
- Division of Hospitality, Tourism, and Food Service Management - Academic Internship Program (University of Central Florida, United States)
- Department of Computer Science and Engineering - Overseas Training Program (Purdue University, United States; San Jose State University, United States)
- Joint Sejong-Syracuse MBA Program (Syracuse University, United States)
- Summer Program (Johnson & Wales University, United States)
- Short-term Language Program (Marylhurst University, United States; The University of Winchester, UK

== Notable people ==
=== Alumni ===
- Chungha, singer
- Gong Hyo-jin, actress
- Guus Hiddink, football coach
- Kino (singer), singer (PENTAGON)
- Han Ji-hye, actress
- G-Dragon, singer (BIGBANG)
- Kang In-soo, singer (Myname)
- Kang Shin-hyo, actor
- Kim Bo-mi, actress and singer (M.I.L.K.)
- Kim Hee-chan, actor
- Kim So-hye, actress and singer
- Kim Sung-eun, actress
- Kyeon Mi-ri, actress and singer
- Lee Ah-hyun, actress
- Lee Da-hee, actress
- Lee Dae-hoon, taekwondo athlete
- Lee Joon-ik, film director
- Lee Se-eun, actress
- Lee Seo-won, actor
- Lee Junho, actor and singer (2PM)
- Nam In-soon, activist and politician
- Oh Chang-seok, actor
- Park Hee-von, actress and singer (M.I.L.K.)
- Park Sung-woo, Produce 101 Season 2
- Shim Ji-ho, actor
- Shin Hye-sun, actress
- Shin Soo-ji, rhythmic gymnast
- Song Geon-hee, actor
- Song Hye-kyo, actress
- Yang Seung-ho, singer (MBLAQ)
- Yeon Woo-jin, actor
- Yoo Ha, film director, screenwriter and poet
- Yoo Yeon-seok, actor
- Yoon Jin-yi, actress
- Yoon Young-ah, actress

=== Faculty ===
The university has nationally renowned celebrities on faculty. They include:

- Han Su-san, Korean language and literature, writer, author of a number of bestselling novels, including Bucho (English title: Floating Grass, 1977); Raven (2003); and For Forgiveness (2010);
- Lee Hyun-se, cartoon and animation; received the Presidential Award for Cartoons; chairs the Korean Cartoonists Association; best known for Armageddon; Mythology of the Heavens; and Nambul: War Stories;
- Lee Soon-jae, Chair Professor, film art, TV/film actor; best known for his award-winning role in High Kick! (2007);
