= Lee Soon-won (writer) =

South Korean writer

Yi Sunwon
- Born: 1957 (age 68–69); Gangneung, South Korea
- Writing career
- Language: Korean

Korean name
- Hangul: 이순원
- RR: I Sunwon
- MR: I Sunwŏn

Yi Sunwon (Korean: 이순원; born 1957) is a modern South Korean writer who writes about diverse topics.

== Life ==
Yi Sunwon was born in Gangneung on the coast of the Sea of Japan in 1957. While in high school, Yi decided to become a farmer. In a dramatic display of his new determination, he burned his school uniform on the beach and moved to a mountainous region in Gwangwon Province where he devoted himself to vegetable farming for two years. Failing health and desire for more education, however, compelled him to return to school and he entered college as an economics major with special interest in advertising.

== Work ==
Yi Sunwon's work is populated with characters who lead a life of consumption outside of the limitations of established society or traditional order. These characters serve as the canvas upon which the values and lifestyle of the new popular consumer society are sketched. By showing the ultimate emptiness and meaninglessness of such lives, Yi assesses the new world pessimistically.

Yi's literary world is as diverse and hard to categorize as his background. He has lived in both urban and rural areas, deep in the mountains and in the seaside towns and has developed a wide range of interests from the tradition of Confucian culture to advertising. Consequently, his works exhibit a great spectrum of literary concerns. In There is No Exit in Apgujeong District, Yi explores the radical idea of terrorism as a possible response to the corruption in capitalist culture. Face is a short story about the May 19th Democratic Uprising and Nineteen is an autobiographical novel that belongs to the genre of Bildungsroman. Innocence is a serial novel that depicts the lives of women scarred by either direct or indirect acts of violence.

Though diverse in subject matter, Yi Sunwon's works share the underlying concern with growing insensitivity to violence and change in modern society and our indifference to the suffering of others. Over the years, however, the sharply critical tone of his works has grown relatively mild. The Color of Water, the Pattern of That Shade published in 1996 marks a point of change in the author's perspective from cold and analytical to warm and compassionate. The Color of Water, the Pattern of That Shade is a moving story of family hardships and maternal love which also explores the negative side effects of rapid industrialization.

== Works in translation ==
- Susaek: A Novel (Homa & Sekey Books, 2008) - translated by Kang Hyunsook, Lee Jinah, and Robert Parker ISBN 9781931907477
- Looking for a Horse (ASIA Publishers, 2014) - translated by Michelle Jooeun-Kim ISBN 9791156620563

== Works in Korean (partial) ==
Short Story Collections

- Face (얼굴, 1993)
- Susaek, the Pattern of That Shade (수색, 그 물빛 무늬, 1996)
- In Search of a Horse (말을 찾아서, 1997)

Novellas

- Daytime Moon (낮달, 1988)
- Eunbiryeong (은비령(銀飛領), 1997)
- Meditation on Jellyfish (해파리에 관한 명상, 1998)
- Love Like Poison (독약 같은 사랑, 1998)
- Innocence (순수, 2000)
- Twenty-Three and Forty-Six (스물셋, 그리고 마흔여섯, 2004)
- Model (모델, 2004)

== Awards ==
- Dong-in Literary Award (1996) - for "Searching, a Pattern Flowing into My Mother's Heart" (수색, 어머니 가슴속으로 흐르는 무늬)
- Yi Hyoseok Literary Award (2000) - for "A Father's Sleep" (아비의 잠)
