= Lee Gi-seong =

South Korean poet (born 1966)

Lee Gi-seong (Korean: 이기성; born 1966) is a South Korean poet. She was born in Seoul and earned her bachelors and master's from Ewha Womans University in Korean Literature. She is currently working as a lecturer at her alma mater. She is praised as a modernist poet who uniquely expresses the inner anxiety of modern society. She received the Hyundae Literary Award in 2015.

== Education ==
She received a doctorate degree for her paper on modernist poetry, and her own poetry is also described as belonging to modernism.

== Life ==
Lee's career started in 1998 when she published the poems "Jihado ipgu-eseo" (지하도 입구에서 At the Entrance of the Underground Passage), "Uponeup" (우포늪 Upo Marsh), and "Amudo boji mot-han punggyeong" (아무도 보지 못한 풍경 A Scene Nobody Has Seen) in Literature and Society, as well as a critical essay in 2001 in 21st Century Literature. Currently, she is a lecturer at Ewha Womans University. She has published poetry collections Bulssuk naemin son (불쑥 내민 손 Suddenly Given Hand), and Ta-ileu modeun gut (타일의 모든 것 Everything About Tiles). Her poetry was also published in the poetry journal Po&sie's special issue on Korean poets.

== Writing ==
From the time of her debut, Lee Gi-seong was praised as 'a poet that had carved out a territory of her own with thoroughly detailed description of the ruinous aspect of life'. As such, she dramatically transcribes the tragic parts of life. She persistently captures the scenes of devastation in life, and describes them in her own language. This gives her work a fantastical, yet ordinary feeling. Kim Sa-in has stated that she has a perspective on life that 'doesn't lose social acuteness, but also doesn't allow excessive passion to overrun her poetry, that she does not take lightly the individuality of her own voice and creative methods while still following her era, and that she maintains decency while possessing anger and sadness'.

In her first poetry collection Bulssuk naemin son (불쑥 내민 손; Suddenly Given Hand), published in 2004, is a detailed record of life in a city marred by death and corruption. Also, this collection has painfully depicted the process of how a modern person becomes aware of the uncomfortable discord, loneliness, and desolation that unexpectedly arise from everyday life.

From then on, Lee Gi-seong has often used the method distorting her perspective on the objective world. Her second poetry collection, Ta-ileu modeun gut (타일의 모든 것; Everything About Tiles), has developed such aspect of her poetry. Here, despite the poet having 'unpleasant passion' for facing against the gray reality, rather than literally describing that, she reveals her 'reckless courage' for finding another way.

Recently, with a more mature perspective, the poet describes the life of a modern person that lives as an anonymous being. In her poetry, those that are left in want show emotions such as depression, sadness, grief, and lethargy. However, she does not only mire in futility, but rather attempts to overcome such emotions through self-reflection and action. By reminding herself of the vitality of 'language' and 'poetry' in a corrupt world, she is exploring the possibility of new poetic potential.

== Awards and honours ==
She was awarded the Hyundae Literary Award in 2015 for Gul sonyeonui norae (굴 소년의 노래 The Oyster Boy's Song).

== Works ==
=== Poetry collections ===
- Bulssuk naemin son (불쑥 내민 손; Suddenly Given Hand), Munhakgwajiseongsa, 2004.
- Ta-ileu modeun gut (타일의 모든 것; Everything About Tiles), Munhakgwajiseongsa, 2010.
- Chaesikju-uijaui siktak (채식주의자의 식탁; The Table of a Vegetarian), Munhakgwajiseongsa, 2015.

=== Critical essays ===
- Modeonijeumui simyeoneul geonneoneun sijeok yeojeong (모더니즘의 심연을 건너는 시적 여정; A Poetic Journey Across Modernism's Inner Side), Somyeongchulpan, 2006.
- Uri, yukwaehan sajeonkkundeul (우리, 유쾌한 사전꾼들; We, the Happy Counterfeiters), Somyeongchulpan, 2009
- Baekji wiui son (백지 위의 손; The Hand Above the Blank Paper), Kepoibooks, 2015.

== Awards ==
- 2015, Hyundae Literary Award
