= Kim Keum-hee =

South Korean writer (born 1979)

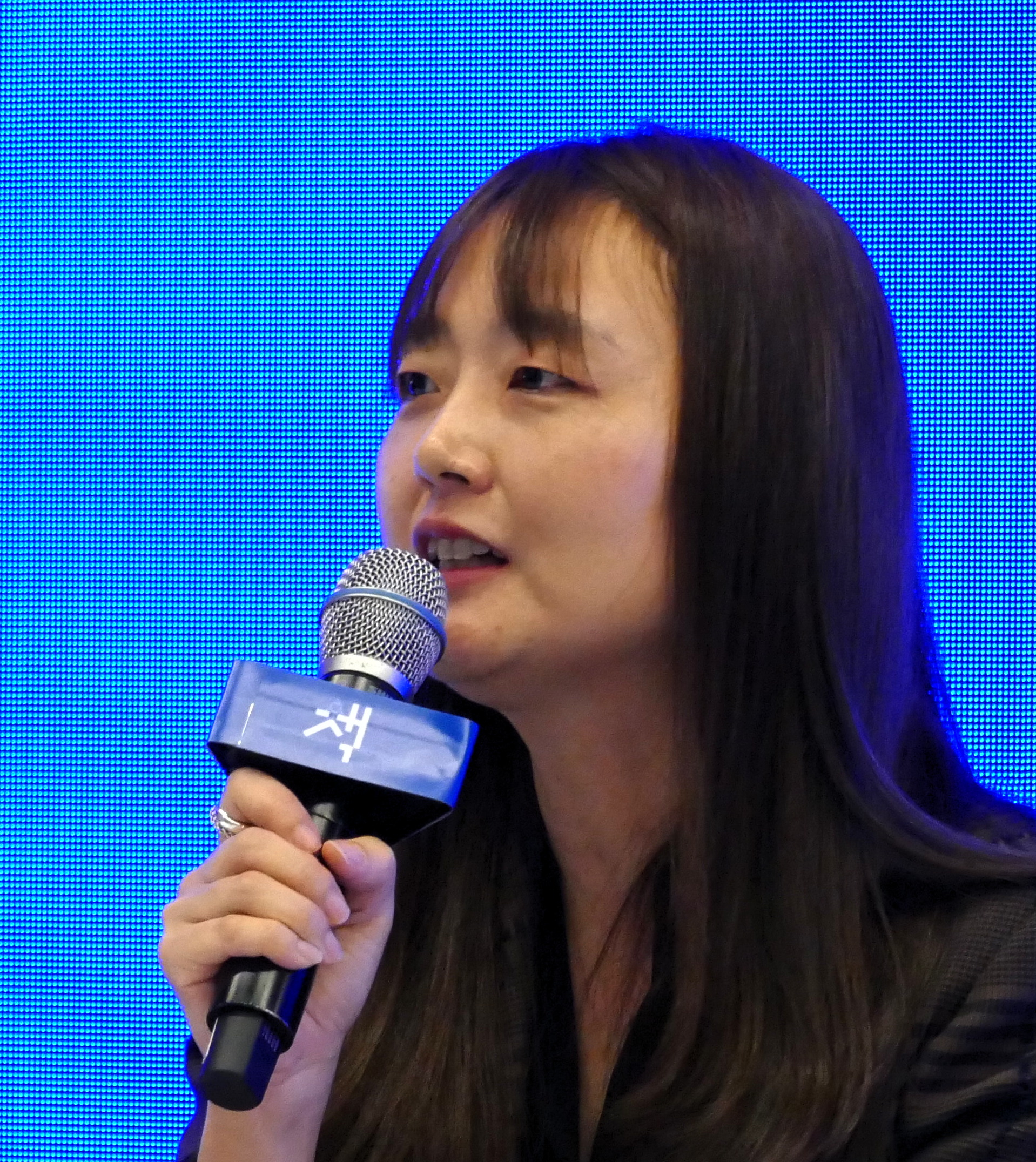
Kim Keum Hee, a South Korean writer

Kim Keum Hee (Korean: 김금희; born October 10, 1979) is a South Korean writer. She made her literary debut in 2009 when her short story “Neoui dokyumeonteu” (너의 도큐먼트 Your Document) won the Korea Times New Writer's Contest. She published her first short story collection Sentimenteoldo haruiteul (센티멘털도 하루이틀 Sentimentality Works Only for a Day or Two) in 2014. The book won the 33rd Sin Dong-yup Prize for Literature. Her short story "Jo Junggyuneui segye" (조중균의 세계 The World of Jo Jung-gyun) received the 6th Munhakdongne Young Writers' Award in 2015. She won the same award in 2016 and 2017 for “Neomu hannajeui yeonae” (너무 한낮의 연애 Too Bright Outside for Love) and “Munsang” (문상 Attending a Funeral), respectively. Her 2016 win was for the Grand Prize.

== Life ==
Kim Keum Hee was born in Busan, South Korea on October 10, 1979. Her family soon moved to Incheon, where she spent most of her childhood. She lived near a lumber yard on the outskirts of the city. The suburban landscape of Incheon features heavily in her debut work Sentimenteoldo haruiteul (센티멘털도 하루이틀 Sentimentality Works Only for a Day or Two). With both her parents working, she was often left home alone during her childhood. According to an interview, she began writing fiction to cope with years of pent-up loneliness and anger.

In 1998, Kim enrolled in the Korean literature program at Inha University. Kim recalls being "a Korean literature nerd who loved fiction and only wanted to write fiction." Upon graduation, she joined a publisher as an editor. She perceived both social injustices and opportunities for social solidarity during her tenure at the publisher. In particular, she was frustrated at the company’s heavy-handed behavior toward its employees, treating salary payments as a charitable act rather than fair compensation for their work. This was how, she believed, the company forced workers into submission. At the same time, however, she met good colleagues and observed a strong bond between workers.

Kim won the Korea Times New Writer's Contest in 2009, marking her literary debut. She has penned two short story collections to date. She is the winner of the 6th, 7th, and 8th Munhakdongne Young Writers' Award, 33rd Sin Dong-yup Prize for Literature, and 62nd Hyundae Literary Award. Her second short story collection Neomu hannajeui yeonae (너무 한낮의 연애 Too Bright Outside for Love), published in May 2016, is already on its tenth edition as of April 2017 due to its high popularity among readers.

== Writing ==
A common theme in Kim's works is a throwback to old things. Unlike many of her Korean contemporaries, Kim is not interested in the rigidity lying beneath a seemingly flexible social order nor the despair over a life with no prospects. She tends to avoid employing powerful aesthetics or offering escapism in response to social injustices. She focuses on accepting the past as it is. Rather than rejecting frustrating realities or running away from them, her characters take ownership of who they are and their situation.

Kim restores the values of old or forgotten things. Many of the short stories in her debut work Sentimenteoldo haruiteul (센티멘털도 하루이틀 Sentimentality Works Only for a Day or Two) are about fathers who were heroes of a previous generation but now have no place to stand. For example, "Neoui dokyumeonteu" (너의 도큐먼트 Your Document) is about a woman who goes around town holding a map to look for her runaway father. "Aideul" (아이들 Children) is also about a woman’s journey to understand the lives of her parents who worked all their lives to realize their middle-class dream.

Although Kim has written fewer stories about fathers since her first book, her works still show sympathy with the old. "Jo Junggyuneui segye" (조중균의 세계 The World of Jo Jung-gyun) is a short story about the anonymous poets of a bygone era who resisted South Korea’s former authoritarian government, and "Sesilia" (세실리아 Cecilia) recounts the past of a rape victim and social outcast.

== Works ==
- 『너무 한낮의 연애』(2016) – Too Bright Outside for Love (2016)
- 『센티멘털도 하루이틀』(2014) – Sentimentality Works Only for a Day or Two (2014)

=== Works in Translation ===
- Everything About Chess (English)

== Awards ==
1. 2017: Munhakdongne Young Writers' Award
2. 2017: Hyundae Literary Award
3. 2016: Munhakdongne Young Writers' Award
4. 2015: Sin Dong-yup Prize for Literature
5. 2015: Munhakdongne Young Writers' Award
