= Yoon Sung-hee =

South Korean writer (born 1973)

Yoon Sung-hee (born 1973) is a South Korean writer. Some writers believe that the goal of human life can be found in history. Some writers believe that the meaning of life is in intense moments that leave life in chaos. However, Yoon looks at life from a different perspective. She would say that the meaning of life is in the moments. In other words, the true important purpose of life is in the feeling of the present, and the diverse emotions from it such as pain, sympathy, pity, and beauty. One literary critic has stated the characteristic of Yoon's fiction as following. "The reality depicted by Yoon Sung-hee in her stories draws readers in with its colorfulness of a sensual present. Readers do not draw the story to their own historical lives, but they choose to climb into the reality inside the story, and live along with the characters." It can be said that Yoon's literary aim is to create a reading experience that breathes with the rhythm of life, using fiction as the subject.

== Early life ==
Yoon was born in 1973 in Suwon, Gyeonggi-do. She entered Cheongju University in 1991 and studied philosophy, but she spent more time on reading literary magazines then on her major, and once she realized that it gave her a strong sense of happiness, right after graduation she entered the Seoul Institute of the Arts for creative writing. She chose that course because she loved poetry, but after taking poetry classes, she was disappointed that her abilities were much lower than her expectations. However, she was unsuspectingly enjoying the fiction writing class. She spent all night writing a story for an assignment from professor Park Ki-dong who was teaching fiction writing at the time. She had felt an unknown passion then, and was attracted to fiction writing through that experience.

== Career ==
Yoon began her career as a writer when her short story "Legoro mandeun jib" (레고로 만든 집 A House Made of Legos) won The Dong-A Ilbo New Writer's Contest in 1999. Yoon has said that she always writes while remembering the words of the judges written for her selection for the new writer's contest, which were, we hope that this writer could become more original, and stronger. Originality, and the strength of fiction, or its ability to reach out to someone, became the most basic reasons for her drive behind writing fiction. 3 years after her debut, she published her first collection, Legoro mandeun jib (레고로 만든 집 A House Made of Legos), and then she published various collections up to 2017; Geogi, dangsin (거기, 당신? Over There, Is It You?) in 2004; Gamgi (감기 Cold) in 2007; Utneun dongan (웃는 동안 While Laughing) in 2011; and Begereul beda (베게를 베다 Resting on a Pillow) in 2016. She has also published a novel, Gugyeongkkundeul (구경꾼들 The Bystanders) in 2010. During this time, Yoon won the 50th Hyundae Literary Award with "Yuteonjijeome bomuljidoreul mutda" (유턴지점에 보물지도를 묻다 Burying a Treasure Map At the U-turn Spot), the 2nd This Year's Art Prize in Literature with "Geogi, dangsin" (거기, 당신? Over There, Is It You?), the 14th Isu Literature Prize with "Hadaman mal" (하다만 말 Unfinished Words), the 11th Hwang Sun-won Literary Award with "Bumerang" (부메랑 Boomerang), and the 49th Hankook Ilbo Literary Prize with "Begereul beda" (베게를 베다 Resting on a Pillow). Yoon's short story "Geu namjaui chaek 198 jjok" (그 남자의 책 198쪽 Page 198 of the Man's Book) was produced into a movie of the same name by director Kim Jung-kwon in 2008.

== Writing style ==
Yoon, who began her literary debut via a new writer's contest in 1999, is one of the most significant writers of Korean literature after 2000, due to her distinct periodic characteristics, and her works being clearly differentiated from earlier fiction. If South Korean fiction in the 1980s focused on the side of the public fighting against the country's ideology or being sacrificed due to oppression, South Korean fiction in the 1990s have strived for realizing the thesis of individual authenticity. Compared to this, South Korean fiction in the 2000s is reproducing the personalities of various individuals, and rich sensations of reality. First, one of the characteristics of fiction by Yoon Sung-hee is her sensitivity to visual details. Hwang Jong-yeon has said that Yoon is a "writer of the polaroid generation, who has grown up with the marvels of camera technology", and describes that "the founding idea of the meticulous descriptions that are prevalent across Yoon's fiction, is that something visual (expression, behavior, action, the views) correlated with something intangible (experiences, mind, the truth), and that it is the most realistic correlation. While thoroughly depicting the many actions and events that form a person's everyday life, Yoon Sung-hee focuses on the special moments when those elements turn into the representation of the reality, or the true form of that person's life. The lives of individuals that Yoon Sung-hee depicts have small area of activity, and lacks content, but the details are always preparing a small wonder, in which hidden desires, relationships, and situations that the individual may not express, or may not have known, are realized."

Another characteristic of Yoon's fiction is her view that captures the "patterns of a capitalistic life". Literary critic Kim Yeong-chan has said that "The characteristic, as well as a strength, of Yoon Sung-hee's fiction, is that even as she vividly lays out the individual living situations within the unhandsome peripheral modernity, she does not color it with another ideological narrative, or romanticizes it too rashly." And he adds that "meanwhile, the writer carefully captures the various patterns of individualistic lives, where people endure the harsh living of late modernity through self positivity as a dignified individual that cannot be reduced in any way."

== Works ==
=== Collections ===
- Begereul beda (베게를 베다 Resting on a Pillow), Munhakdongne, 2016.
- Utneun dongan (웃는 동안 While Laughing), Moonji, 2011.
- Gamgi (감기 Cold), Changbi, 2007.
- Geogi, dangsin (거기, 당신? Over There, Is It You?), Munhakdongne, 2004.
- Legoro mandeun jib (레고로 만든 집 A House Made of Legos), Minumsa, 2001.

=== Novels ===
- Gugyeongkkundeul (구경꾼들 The Bystanders), Munhakdongne, 2010.

=== Works in translation ===
- Espectadores (Spanish)
- 美丽的日子 (Chinese)

== Awards ==
- 2016 49th Hankook Ilbo Literary Prize
- 2013 14th Lee Hyo-seok Literary Award
- 2011 11th Hwang Sun-won Literary Award
- 2007 14th Isu Literature Prize
- 2005 2nd This Year's Art Prize in Literature
- 2005 50th Hyundae Literary Award
