= Jo Kyung-ran =

South Korean writer

Jo Kyung Ran
- Born: 1969 (age 56–57)
- Writing career
- Language: Korean

- Jo Kyung-ran
- Hangul: 조경란
- RR: Jo Gyeongran
- MR: Cho Kyŏngnan

Jo Kyung Ran (This is the author's preferred Romanization per LTI Korea) is a South Korean writer.

== Life ==
Jo Kyung Ran was born in Seoul in 1969 where she went on to study creative writing at the Seoul Institute of the Arts, but did not decide to become a writer until she turned 28. Jo lived in Bonngcheon-dong for nearly 20 years in a small rooftop apartment that her father built for her. She made her literary debut in 1996 with the short story, French Optical which won the Donga-Ilbo Prize. Internationally famous, she is a speaker in demand for conferences, having appeared at “Beyond Borders: Translating and Publishing Korean Literature in the U.S.” in New York in 2009 and more recently at The Seoul International Forum for Literature 2011.

== Work ==
Jo's work is famous for taking trivial, mundane, and everyday occurrences and delicately describing them in subtle emotional tones.

LTI Korea describes her contributions to Korean Literature:

Cho tends to dwell on the impressions (things) make, and with precision and sensitivity, describes their effect on the inner world of the protagonist. Often, she describes her characters minimally or presents them like objects lacking personality, thereby accentuating human alienation and difficulty of communication in the modern world. The author, nonetheless, suggests a possibility for meaningful human relationships by shedding light on those aspects of life that has not been corrupted by consumeristic or merely sexual interaction between people.

Her work has won the Munhakdongne New Writer Award, the Today's Young Artist Award, The Contemporary Literature Award (for the 2003 novella A Narrow Gate), and the Dong-in Literary Award(2008). Her work has been translated into French, German, Hebrew and English.

== Works in Korean (Partial) ==
- French Optical (1997)
- Time for Breaking Bread (1997, 식빵 굽는 시간)
- My Purple Sofa (2000)
- Looking for the Elephant (2002, 코끼리를 찾아서)
- The Ladle Story (2004)
- Tongue (2007)
- I Bought a Balloon (2008)
- Swordfish
- Versammelte lichter (소설선)

== Awards ==
- 1st Literary Community New Writer's Award(1996)
- Dong-in Literary Award (2008 for Buying a Balloon)
