= Kim Jung-hyuk (author) =

Korean author and cartoonist (born 1971)

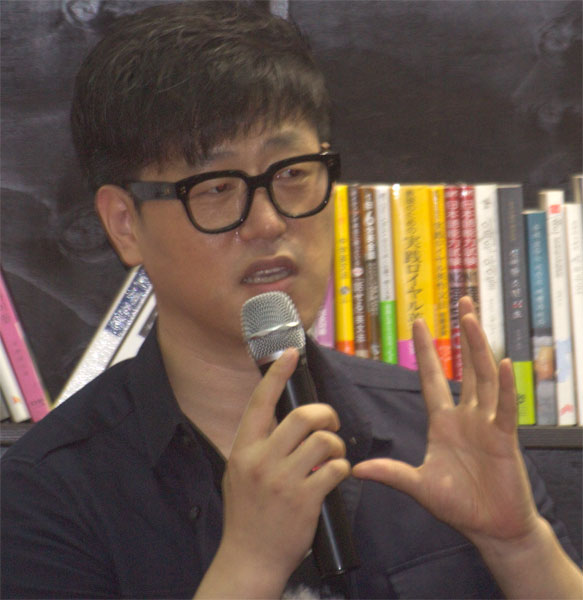
- Born: 1971 (age 54–55); Kimcheon, Korea
- Occupation: Writer
- Writing career
- Language: Korean
- Period: 2000-present
- Genre: Fiction

- Korean name
- Hangul: 김중혁
- RR: Gim Junghyeok
- MR: Kim Chunghyŏk

Kim Jung-hyuk is a Korean author and cartoonist.

== Life ==
Born in Kimcheon, North Gyeongsang Province in 1971, Kim has written professional book reviews for an online bookstore, handled DVDs for a bookstore that specializes in art, writing music columns for a pop culture magazine, and contributed for a restaurant industry magazine. In addition to literature, he is interested in a wide range of fields. Given his interest in drawing and cartoons, he has drawn his own illustrations for his story collections and works freelance as a cartoonist.

== Work ==
Characters with unusual personalities or rare jobs also appear in his stories: a “conceptual inventor” who confines himself underground and invents useless concepts; a man who wanders in search of “Banana, Inc.” with a rough map left behind by a friend who committed suicide; a map surveyor who searches for his direction in life, using a wooden Eskimo map.

== Works in Translation ==
- The Glass Shield
- 楽器たちの 図書館 (Japanese)
- J'etais un maquereau (French)
- La Bibliothèque des instruments de musique (French)

== Works in Korean (Partial) ==
Short Story Collections

- Penguin News (2000)
- Library of Instruments (2008)

== Awards ==
- 2008, his short story, “Offbeat D,” won the 2nd Kim Yujeong Literary Award.
- 2010 Munhak Dongne Young Artist Award
- 2011 Today's Young Artist Award
- 2012 Yi Hyo-seok Literature Award
