= List of Korean novelists =

This is a partial list of Korean novelists.

== A ==
- Ahn Jung-hyo
- Ahn Soo-kil

== B ==
- Bae Su-ah
- Baek Minseok
- Bang Hyun-seok
- Bang Young-ung
- Bok Koh-il

== C ==
- Jeong Chan (author)
- Cheon Myeong-kwan
- Cho Hae-il
- Choi In-ho
- Choi Il-nam
- Choi In-hun
- Choi Soo-cheol
- Chae Man-shik
- Cho Se-hui
- Cho Seon-jak
- Cho Sung-ki
- Choe Yun
- Chun Woon-young

== D ==
- Do Sunwoo

== G ==
- Gong Ji-young
- Gong Sun-ok
- Gu Hyo-seo

== H ==
- Ha Geun-chan
- Ha Seong-nan
- Hailji
- Han Chang-hun
- Han Kang
- Hyun Kil-Un
- Han Mahlsook
- Han Moo-sook
- Han Sorya
- Han Su-san
- Hŏ Kyun
- Hong Sung-won
- Hwang Boreum
- Hwang Suk-young
- Hwang Sun-mi
- Hwang Sun-won
- Hyun Jin-geon

== I ==
- Im Chul-woo

== J ==
- Jang Eun-jin
- Jang Jeong-il
- Jeon Gyeong-rin
- Jeon Sang-guk
- Jeong Do-sang
- Jo Jung-rae
- Jo Kyung-ran
- Jung Eun-gwol
- Jung Ihyun
- Jung Hansuk
- Jung Mi-kyung
- Jung Young-moon

== K ==
- Kang Kyeong-ae
- Kang Sok-Kyong
- Kang Younghill
- Kang Young-sook
- Kim Ae-ran
- Kim Byeol-ah
- Kim Chae-won
- Kim Chi-won
- Kim Dong-in
- Kim Dong-ni
- Kim Gu-yong
- Kim Gyeong Uk
- Kim Haki
- Kim In-suk
- Kim Jae-Young
- Kim Jeong-han
- Kim Jeong-hwan
- Kim Ju-yeong
- Kim Mi-wol
- Kim Moon-soo (novelist)
- Kim Myeong-sun
- Kim Ryeo-ryeong
- Kim Tak-hwan
- Kim Yeon-su
- Kim Yoo-jung
- Kim Seong-dong
- Kim Seung-ok
- Kim Won-il
- Kim Wonu
- Kim Yeong-hyeon
- Kim Yong-ik
- Kim Yong-man
- Kim Young-ha
- Ku Kyung-mi
- Kwon Jeong Saeng
- Kwon Yeo-sun

== L ==
- Lee Dong-ha
- Lee Ho-cheol
- Lee Hyo-seok
- Lee In-hwa
- Lee Jangwook
- Lee Ki-ho (author)
- Lee Kyun-young
- Lee Mankyo
- Lee Mun Ku
- Lee Oyoung
- Lee Seung-u
- Lee Soon-won
- Lee Yun-gi
- Lee Ze-ha

== N ==
- Na Hye-sok
- Nam Jung-hyun

== O ==
- Oh Jung-hee
- Oh Sangwon
- Oh Soo-yeon (author)
- Oh Young-su

== P ==
- Paik Gahuim
- Park Beom-shin
- Park Chong-hwa
- Park Hyoung-su
- Park Kyung-ni
- Park Min-gyu
- Park Sang-ryung
- Park Taesun
- Park Taewon
- Park Wan-suh
- Park Yeonghan

== S ==
- Seo Hajin
- Seo Jeong-in
- Shin Kyung-sook
- Sim Yunkyung
- So Young-en
- Son Bo-mi
- Song Gisuk
- Song Giwon
- Song Sokze
- Song Soo-Kwon
- Song Yeong

== Y ==
- Yang Gui-ja
- Yi Chong-jun
- Yi Gwangsu
- Yi In-Seong
- Yi Kyoung-Ja
- Yi Mun-yol
- Yi Sang
- Yom Sang-seop
- Yoo Jae-yong
- Yu Haeon-jong
- Yun Dae-nyeong
- Yun Heung-gil

== See also ==
- List of Korean-language poets
- Korean literature
