= South Korean literature =

See also Culture of South Korea, Korean literature until 1945, and North Korean literature

Byeolmadang Library at Starfield COEX Mall in seoul

South Korean literature is literature written or produced in South Korea following the division of Korea into North and South in 1945. South Korean literature is primarily written in Korean.

== Literature by genre ==
=== Mainstream fiction ===
Also referred as 'pure literature' in South Korea. Most authors translated by the Korea Literature Translation Institute for translation falls into this category. The terminology is often criticized, and is a constant theme of discussion in the literature of South Korea.

Some of the notable Korean mainstream fiction writers include:

- An Sugil (안수길; 1911–1977)
- Eun Hee-kyung (은희경; 1959–)
- Seong Seok-jae (성석제; 1960–)
- Park Mingyu (박민규; 1968–)
- Choi Il-nam (최일남; 1932–2023)
- Kim Jae-young (김재영; 1966–)
- Bang Young-ung (방영웅; 1942–2022)
- Bok Geo-il (복거일; 1946–)
- Cho Se-hui (조세희; 1942–2022)
- Park Beom-shin (박범신; 1946–)
- Han Moo-sook (한무숙; 1918–1993)
- Hwang Sok-yong (황석영; 1943–)
- Ahn Junghyo (안정효; 1941–2023)
- Kim Hoon (김훈; 1948–)
- Kim Yeonsu (김연수; 1970–)
- Kim Young-ha (김영하; 1968–)
- Yang Gui-ja (양귀자; 1955–)
- Kim Won-il (김원일; 1942–)
- Gong Seon-ok (공선옥; 1963–)
- Son Chang-seop (손창섭; 1922–2010)
- Kim Seung-ok (김승옥; 1941–)
- Chang Yong-hak (장영학; 1921–1999)
- Kim Joo-young (김주영; 1939–)
- Lee Cheong-jun (이청준; 1939–2008)
- Lee Dong-ha (이동하; 1942–)
- Lee Soon-won (이순원; 1957–)
- Park Wan-suh (박완서; 1931–2011)
- Yi Munyol (이문열; 1948–)
- Yoo Jae-yong (유재영; 1936–2009)
- Yu Heaon-jong (유현종; 1939–)
- Yun Heung-gil (윤흥길; 1942–)
- Yun Hu-myong (윤후명; 1946–)
- Yun Young-su (윤영수; 1952–)
- Shin Kyung-sook (신경숙; 1963–)
- Oh Jung-hee (오정희; 1947–)
- Gu Byeong-mo (구병모; 1976–)

There are also Korean-American writers writing in Korean, e.g. Kim Yong-ik.

=== Popular fiction ===
This term, the popular fiction, is defined as the mass market-targeted works, or as an opposite of the pure literature. This terminology comes from the equivalent Japanese word. But since early 2000, the distinction between mainstream and pop became faint, and some mainstream authors like Gu Byeong-mo or Chung Serang are well-received in both genre, and there is a clear tendency of authors refuse to define themselves as the 'pure literature' author.

==== Historical fiction ====
Historical fiction, or alternative history fiction, is one of the largest selling genre in South Korea. For more serious works, authors like Jo Jung-rae and Park Wan-suh fall into this category. For lighter works, Kim Jin-myung, the author of The Rose of Sharon Blooms Again, is one of the best selling writers. The historical fiction of South Korea often covers the Joseon period and the colonial era. Lee In-hwi's novels often depict historical labor rights issues in South Korea in the 1980s and 1990s.

==== Fantasy ====
Examples of South Korean fantasy writers and their works include:

- Lee Yeongdo (b. 1972): Dragon Raja
- Jeon Min-hee: Children of the Rune
- Lee Woo-hyouk: The Soul Guardians (퇴마록; 退魔錄)
- Kim Sang-hyun: Tamguroo (탐그루)
- Kim Chulgon: The Dragon Lady (드래곤 레이디)
- Hong Jeonghoon: The Rogue (더 로그)
- Ha Jieun: Tower of Ice Tree (얼음나무 숲)
- Bang Jina
- Min Soyeong: The Tower of Storm (폭풍의 탑)

==== Science fiction ====
Examples of South Korean sf writers and their works include:

- Djuna
  - Counterweight (평형추), 2021
- Bae Myung Hoon
- Kim Ewhan
- Kim Bo-young
- Jeong Soyeon

=== Essayists ===
Non-fiction essayists include Chang Young-hee.

=== Poetry ===
List of Korean-language poets

Notable modern poets include Moon Deok-soo (문덕수, 文德守, b.1928), Choi Nam-son (1890–1957) and Kim Sowol, Ki Hyung-do, Chon Sang-pyong.

== South Korean literary awards ==
- Daesan Literary Awards
- Dong-in Literary Award
- Hankook Ilbo Literary Award
- Hyundae Munhak Awards
- Jeong Jiyong Literature Prize
- Manhae Prize for Literature
- Midang Literary Award
- Park Kyong-ni Prize
- Sowol Poetry Prize
- Society of Korean Poets Award
- Yi Sang Literary Award
- Yook Woo Dang Literary Award
