= Kim Jung-hwan =

- Hangul: 김정환
- RR: Gim Jeonghwan
- MR: Kim Chŏnghwan

Kim Jung-hwan or Kim Jeong-hwan is the name of:

- Kim Jeong-hwan (poet) (born 1954), South Korean poet
- Kim Jung-hwan (fencer) (born 1983), South Korean fencer
- Kim Jeong-hwan (volleyball) (born 1988), South Korean volleyball player
- Kim Jeong-hwan (footballer), South Korean footballer
- Kim Jung-hwan (born 1990), South Korean singer better known as Eddy Kim
