= Jung-hwan =

- Hangul: 정환
- RR: Jeonghwan
- MR: Chŏnghwan

Jung-hwan, also spelled Jeong-hwan or Jong-hwan, is a Korean given name.

People with this name include:

== Entertainers ==
- Kim Poong (born Kim Jeong-hwan, 1974), South Korean actor
- Shin Jung-hwan (born 1975), South Korean singer and entertainer
- Seol Jung-hwan (born 1985), South Korean actor and model
- Eddy Kim (born Kim Jung-hwan, 1990), South Korean singer
- Sandeul (born Lee Jung-hwan, 1992), South Korean singer, member of boy band B1A4
- So Junghwan (born 2005) South Korean singer and dancer, member of TREASURE
- Shin Junghwan (born 2003), stage name Shinyu, South Korean singer, member of TWS

== Sportspeople ==
- Yoon Jong-hwan (born 1973), South Korean football manager
- Ahn Jung-hwan (born 1976), South Korean football player
- Park Jung-hwan (footballer) (born 1977), South Korean football player
- Kim Jung-hwan (fencer) (born 1983), South Korean fencer
- An Jeong-hwan (born 1984), South Korean judo practitioner
- Youm Jung-hwan (1985–2014), South Korean cyclist
- Shin Jung-hwan (footballer) (born 1986), South Korean football player
- Kim Jeong-hwan (volleyball) (born 1994), South Korean volleyball player
- Kim Jeong-hwan (footballer) (born 1997), South Korean football player

== Other ==
- Bang Jeong-hwan (1899–1931), Joseon dynasty activist who created Children's Day
- Kim Jeong-hwan (poet) (born 1954), South Korean poet and novelist
- Park Junghwan (born 1993), South Korean go player

== See also ==
- List of Korean given names
