= Lee Jae-yong (disambiguation) =

- Hangul: 이재용
- RR: I Jaeyong
- MR: I Chaeyong

Lee Jae-yong is a South Korean businessman.

It is (Korean: 이재용) is a Korean name consisting of the family name Lee and the given name Jae-yong, and may also refer to:

- Lee Jae-yong (actor) (born 1963), South Korean actor
- E J-yong (born 1966), South Korean film director
