= Kim Ji-won (disambiguation) =

Kim Ji-won (Korean: 김지원; born 1992) is a South Korean actress.

Kim Ji-won may also refer to:

- Kim Ji-won (novelist) (1943–2013), South Korean female novelist
- Kim Ji-won (boxer) (born 1959), South Korean male boxer
- Kim Ji-won (badminton) (born 1995), South Korean female badminton player
- Kim Ji-won, South Korean male rapper who goes by the stage name Bobby (born 1995)
- Kim Ji-won, South Korean female singer who goes by the stage name Liz (born 2004)
