= Kim Yong-man =

- Hangul: 김용만
- RR: Gim Yongman
- MR: Kim Yongman

Kim Yong-man (Korean: 김용만) is a Korean name consisting of the family name Kim and the given name Yong-man, and may also refer to:

- Kim Yong-man (writer) (born 1940), South Korean writer
- Kim Yong-man (comedian) (born 1967), South Korean comedian
