= Kim Moon-soo (disambiguation) =

Kim Moon-soo (born 1951) is a South Korean politician and was the 32nd Governor of Gyeonggi Province from 2006 to 2014.

Kim Moon-soo may also refer to:

- Kim Moon-soo (badminton) (born 1963), former badminton player from South Korea
- Kim Moon-soo (novelist) (1939–2012), Korean novelist
