= Jung Young-moon =

South Korean writer (born 1965)

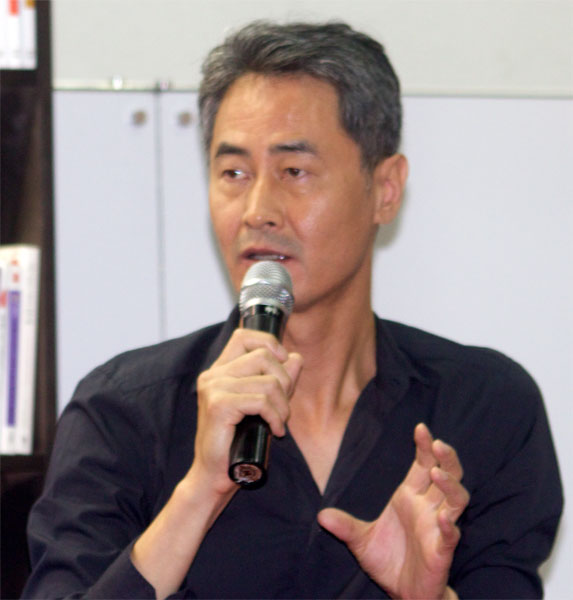
- Jung Young-moon at SIBF 2014
- Born: 1965 (age 60–61); South Korea
- Occupation: Novelist
- Writing career
- Language: Korean
- Period: 1965-Present
- Genre: Avant-garde

- Jung Young-moon
- Hangul: 정영문
- RR: Jeong Yeongmun
- MR: Chŏng Yŏngmun

Jung Young-moon (Korean: 정영문; born 1965) is a South Korean writer.

== Biography ==
Jung Young-moon was born in Hamyang, South Korea in 1965. He graduated from Seoul National University with a degree in psychology. His literary début was in 1996 with the novel A Man Who Barely Exists. Jung is also an accomplished translator who has translated more than forty books from English into Korean. In 1999 he won the 12th Dongseo Literary Award with his collection of short stories, A Chain of Dark Tales. In 2003, the Korean National Theater produced his play The Donkeys. In 2005 Jung was invited to participate in the University of Iowa's International Writing Program, and in 2010 the University of California at Berkeley's Center for Korea Study invited him to participate in a three-month-long residency program.

== Work ==
Jung's debut, the novel A Man who Barely Exists was published in Jakga Segye (Writer's World) in 1996, and as a novel two years later. The novel portrays a man mired in ennui, in which state he contemplates the meaning of life. Following this he released collections and novels including Black Chain Stories (1998), Pale Soliloquy (2000), Yawn (2006) and, most recently, A Contrived World (2012). Black Chain Stories (A Chain of Dark Tales, in English publication) is a collection of Kafkaesque short stories (some extremely short), which delve into the question of what being means, and what the loss of being means.

The Korea Literature Translation Institute summarizes Jung's work:

Jung's stories shared the common denominator of either addressing the grotesque or speaking to the problem of cruel devilishness. Also, in his novels, many of the characters are unable to endure the ennui of life. Their weary hearts are expressed in dark and disturbing ways. One critic even stated that the characters in Jung's stories are like zombies. Nevertheless, he does not fail to include humor. But the laughter that escapes as one reads his stories is rooted in a despondent scorn towards the world, as well as a sense of emptiness that is felt after realizing the absurdity of society. In his novels, the ludicrousness of forlorn and pitiful beings pops up here and there, just as they do in the "theater of the absurd." This is because, rather than conveying the dignity of human existence, people are made the objects of derision.

In contrast to his earlier works, which focused on demons and death, his recent works frequently feature animals or recurring images of forests. Hs most recent publication, Afternoon With a Faun, contains three linked stories, titled "Animals' Songs of Boredom or Anger." In the stories, owls, cats, rabbits, fish, and other animals appear, along with the forest in which they live. In "Something With a Chicken," even a contemptuous myna bird makes an appearance. The denial of human values spurs an interest in "beings that are not human." His works, which disrupt the distinctions between reality and fantasy, human and inhuman, meaning and non-meaning, can be understood as scorn towards an absurd social reality. In that sense, his works are frequently compared to Kafka's.

In his role as translator, Jung has translated a wide range of work including John Fowles' Ebony Tower, Raymond Carver's What We Talk about When We Talk about Love, and Germaine Greer's The Boy.

== Awards ==
- 1999 Dongseo Literary Award
- 2012 Han Moo-sook Literary Award
- 2012 Dong-in Literary Award)
- 2012 Daesan Literary Award

== Works in English ==
- A Chain of Dark Tales (Stallion Press, 2011)
- A Most Ambiguous Sunday and Other Stories (Dalkey Archive Press, 2013)
- Mrs. Brown (Asia Publishers, 2013)
- Vaseline Buddha (Deep Vellum Publishing, 2016)
- Seven Samurai Swept Away in a River (Deep Vellum Publishing, 2019)

== Works in Korean (Partial) ==
- A Man who Barely Exists (1996)
- Black Chain Stories (1998)
- Pale Soliloquy (2000)
- Yawn (2006)
- A Contrived World (2012)
