= Jae-yong =

- Hangul: 재용
- RR: Jaeyong
- MR: Chaeyong

Jae-yong is a Korean given name.

People with this name include:

- Yoo Jae-yong (born 1936), South Korean novelist
- Kwak Jae-yong (born 1959), South Korean director and screenwriter
- Lee Jae-yong (actor) (born 1963), South Korean actor
- E J-yong (born Lee Jae-yong, 1966), South Korean film director
- Lee Jae-yong (businessman) (born 1968), South Korean businessman
- Cho Jae-yong (born 1984), South Korean football player
- Kim Jae-yong (born 1994), South Korean singer and actor

== See also ==
- List of Korean given names
