= Kim Kyung-uk =

South Korean writer

- Born: 1971 (age 54–55)
- Education: M.A.
- Alma mater: Seoul National University
- Occupations: Author, Professor of Creative Writing
- Writing career
- Language: Korean
- Notable work: 99%
- Notable awards: Contemporary Literature Award

Korean name
- Hangul: 김경욱
- Hanja: 金勁旭
- RR: Gim Gyeonguk
- MR: Kim Kyŏnguk

Kim Kyung-uk (Korean: 김경욱; born 1971) is a South Korean author.

== Life ==
Kim Kyung-uk was born in Gwangju, South Jeolla Province, South Korea in 1971. He completed his undergraduate degree in English Language and Literature and a master's degree in Korean Language and Literature from Seoul National University. His career as a novelist began when he won the 1993 Best New Writer Award from the quarterly Writer's World for his novella Outsider. In 2013, he participated in the International Writing Program (IWP) at the University of Iowa. Kim teaches creative writing at the Korean National University of Arts in the School of Drama.

== Work ==
Kim's debut short story "Outsider," published in 1993 when still in university, follows a first-person narrator passing several stops on the Seoul subway while recalling memories concerning a high school student he had once taught. While depicting the expressions of anonymous crowds in the urban subterranean world, the narrator continuously mulls over movie scenes and bars of pop music. Kim's first novel Acropolis depicts university campus life in the early 1990s when interest in ideology abruptly waned. Kim persistently followed what is called the 1990s generation and the culture that dominated that time in his work.

Kim Kyung-uk not only had a great interest in music but, responding to the visual era, he published many works that explored his interest in movies and his cinematic imagination. In fact, Kim's first short story collection There’s No Coffee at the Bagdad Cafe takes its title from the Percy Adlon movie Bagdad Café. The title story of the collection is about an assistant film director who, while scouting for potential shooting locations, meets a woman. The novel Morrison Hotel takes its title from the 1970s album of the rock group The Doors, and the short story collections Who Killed Kurt Cobain? and Leslie Chung is Dead? take their titles from the band leader Kurt Cobain of Nirvana, who largely symbolized the 1990s, and the Hong Kong-based movie star Leslie Cheung. Notably, The Doors vocalist Jim Morrison, Kurt Cobain, and Leslie Cheung were all icons who committed suicide.

More recently, the world of Kim's fiction has been moving away from the sphere of contemporary culture. He has also published The Golden Apple, a novel based on Umberto Eco’s The Name of the Rose, and The Kingdom of a Thousand Years about the Dutch man Weltevree, who was shipwrecked on the shores of Chosun in 1627.

== Works in Korean ==
Short story collections

- There is No Coffee at the Bagdad Café (Bageudadeu kape-eneun keopi-ga eoptda 1996)
- Going to Meet Betty (Beti-reul mannareo gada 1999)
- Who Killed Kurt Cobain? (Nuga keoteu kobein-eul jukyeoss-neunga 2003)
- Is Leslie Chung Really Dead? (Janggukyeong-i jukeossdago? 2005)
- Risky Reading (Wiheomhan dokseo 2008)
- God has no Grandchildren (Sin-egeneun sonja-ga eoptda 2011)

Novels

- Acropolis (Akeuropolliseu 1995)
- Morrison Hotel (Moriseun hotel 1997)
- The Golden Apple (Hwanggeum sagwa 2002)
- Kingdom of a Thousand Years (Cheonnyeon-ui wangguk 2007)
- Like a Fairy Tale (Donghwacheoreom 2010)
- What is Baseball (Yaguran mueot-inga 2013)

== Awards ==
- Writer's World Best New Writer's Award (1993)
- Contemporary Literature (Hyundae Munhak) Award (2008)
- Dong-in Literary Award (2009)
- Hankook Ilbo Literature Prize (2004)

== See also ==
- Korean Literature
- List of Korean novelists
