= Kang Sok-kyong =

South Korean author

Kang Sŏk-kyŏng
- Born: 10 January 1951
- Occupation: Writer
- Writing career
- Language: Korean
- Genre: Fiction

Korean name
- Hangul: 강석경
- Hanja: 姜石景
- RR: Gang Seokgyeong
- MR: Kang Sŏkkyŏng

Kang Sŏk-kyŏng (born 10 January 1951) is a South Korean author with two works translated into English.

== Life ==
Kang was born in Daegu, and attended Ewha Womans University in Seoul. Originally a student of fine arts, she stumbled into a literary career quite accidentally when she entered a creative writing contest to raise tuition for graduate studies in sculpture and art criticism. Her debut works were "Roots" (Geun) and "Open Game" (Opeun Gaeim) for which she received the Literary Ideology Award in 1974. Her talent was unmistakable from the beginning, and for more than thirty years since her debut, she has remained a prolific and respected writer.

== Work ==
Kang has focused on the "search for the self" in her fiction. Having faced a difficult choice between fine art and writing, Kang recognizes that life is filled with diverging roads and attendant dilemmas, which allow us a glimpse into our true selves.

Kang's fiction can be divided into two categories. In the first, she examines the search for the true self from the perspective of an artist, whose quests are unadulterated by any social or political agenda. In the second category, Gang focuses on ordinary individuals and shows the ways in which social structure and conventions can damage human dignity. Many of her works concerns the inhumanity she finds within the Korean society.

Literature, for Kang, is a way to heal wounded souls, by means of which one can take a step closer to the true essence of human life. Her trip to India in 1992 allowed her a powerful experience of the "infinite universe", as a result of which she realized that all obsessions are primitive in nature. "Violence is the source of all oppressions," she has once stated, "and function of literature is to strip away the falsities and superfluous concerns beclouding the true essence of human life, thereby contributing to the expansion of human freedom ..." .

== Awards ==
- 2013 Dongni Literature Prize
- 2001 21st Century Literature Prize
- 1986 Today's Writer Award
- 1986 Nokwon Literature Prize
- 1974 Literary Ideology Newcomer's Award

== Works in translation ==
- The Valley Nearby
- Words of Farewell

== Works in Korean (partial) ==
- "Open Game" (Opeun gaeim 1974)
- "Roots" (Geun 1974)
- "A Room in the Forest" (Supsok ui bang, 1985)
- "The Valley Nearby" (Gakkaun goljjagi, 1989)
- "Journey to India" (Indo gihaeng, 1990)
- "Toto Who Went to India" (Indoro gan ttotto, 1994)
- "All the Stars In the World Rises in Lhasa" (Sesang ui byeoleun da lasa e tteunda, 1996)
- "The Road to the Tomb" (Neung euro ganeun gil, 2000)

== See also ==
- List of women writers
- List of Korean novelists
