= Gu Hyo-seo =

Korean author (born 1958)

- Born: September 25, 1958 (age 67)
- Citizenship: South Korean
- Writing career
- Language: Korean

- Korean name
- Hangul: 구효서
- Hanja: 具孝書
- RR: Gu Hyoseo
- MR: Ku Hyosŏ

Gu Hyo-seo (Korean: 구효서; born September 25, 1958) is a Korean author.

== Life ==
Gu Hyo-seo was born in Incheon, South Korea, in 1958. Gu began his literary career in 1987 with the publication of his short story, "Madi" in the JoongAng Ilbo. Since then, Gu has published over twenty novels and short story collections.

== Work ==
Gu is an eclectic writer. His literary style spans a wide spectrum, to the extent that no other Korean writer is as difficult to pin down as him. He has even been referred to as a “nomadic writer” as a result. To that extent, he has endlessly pursued and experimented with new and diverse styles. Gu's early works are known for their realistic style centered on history and society. His debut work, "Madi," addressed the suffering of women in modern Korean history, from the time of the Korean War to the Gwangju massacre. The stories in his first collection, Will the Sunset Come Again, show how the suffering of modern history lingers in the suffering of individuals. In the 1990s, Gu began to explore a range of possibilities in literary fiction. In addition to the novel, Radio, Radio, that reminisced romantically on folk ways and traditional agricultural society, his second collection, A Loudspeaker and a Sniper, exposes the violence behind the mechanisms of information. The short stories in his collection, Her Thin Cheeks, stand out for their allegorical or fantasy structures that question the meaning of creative writing and the literary institution. The collection, Village Without a Can Opener, and the novel, An Unfamiliar Summer, address the emptiness of city life in an industrial society. Reminiscent of Borges and Eco, Secret Door is a novel about history and religion. He also published a three-volume work on love and separation: Jŏngbyŏl, Myebyŏl, and Aebyŏl. Having been born in a country village with no electricity or radio, Gu Hyo-seo has said that he marvels at the fact that he lives in an era where the world can be seen at a glance through television and the internet. He can be described as a writer who constantly searches for new directions in literature without turning his back on rapid social changes.

== Awards ==
- Village Without a Can Opener (1994, Hanguk Ilbo Literary Award)
- A Sack of Salt (2005, Yi Hyo-seok Literary Award)
- Myŏngdu (2006, Hwangsuweon Literary Award)
- EBS Radio Literature Award of Excellence (2013)

== Works in Korean (Partial) ==
Short story collections

- Will the Sunset Come Again (1990)
- A Loudspeaker and a Sniper (1993)
- Village Without a Can Opener (1995)

Novels

- How to Cross a Swamp (1991)
- An Unfamiliar Summer (1994)
- Radio, Radio (1995)
- Secret Door (2 vol., 1996)
- Story of Onam Village (serial novel, 1998)
- Im Kkŏkjŏng the Villain (2 vol., 2000)
- Nagasaki Papa (2007).

== See also ==
- Korean Literature
- List of Korean novelists
