= From Below the Bridge =

From Below the Bridge is a short story by Korean American author Kim Yong-ik. The story—considered to be one of Kim's best works—encompasses a tale set during the Korean War. The story was originally published in 1958.

== Description ==
From Below the Bridge was written by Yong-ik in 1958; the story was published in Mademoiselle the same year. The story was one of 13 short stories published by Kim in a 1969 compilation titled Love in Winter. Along with Village Wine (written by Kim in 1976), From Below the Bridge was included in Martha Foley's The Best American Short Stories. The work was self-translated by Kim from Korean into English.

== Plot ==
The story takes place near Pusan, South Korea, several months after the beginning of the Korean War. A family (a father, mother, boy, and a dog) of farmers has fled from their homes in Sang Po, and now live under a bridge. The father is very traditional, wearing a gat, while his son is more modern, having learned how to make money off of the "long-nose" American soldiers (by shining shoes and leading them to "Shibi-Shibi" girls—prostitutes—to be serviced), going so far as to adopt parts of their jargon. The mother takes pride in her son's money making skills, and views her husband as weak, much to his chagrin.

The family is destitute, but plans to return home by train. Their dog, however, is sickened after being over-fed by soldiers, and at the station the son refuses to part with him. In an ensuing confrontation, the father's gat is knocked off, revealing him to be a young man. This draws disparaging comments from the crowd, as most young men have been drafted to fight in the war; many assume that the father only wears his gat so that he can pass as an older man and avoid having to fight. The father, angered and frustrated by the lack of respect being shown to him and his heritage, chooses to walk back to Sango Po, telling his family to take next day's train.

The mother and son return to their bridge to find it occupied by another refugee woman. The dog's condition worsens, and the boy wanders a nearby town, which is filled with churchgoers and "Shibi-Shibi" girls pairing with their American lovers. After military police scatter the prostitutes, the boy finds his mother among them. Despairing, he flees into the countryside, followed by his mother and his dying dog. The dog soon collapses, whereupon the mother and son silently stay with him. At nightfall, a passing elderly farmer allows the dog into his horse-drawn cart, promising to bury him when he dies. He tells the couple a story about the origin of the gat - explaining that the garment was intentionally designed to be delicate and easy to knock off so as to deter men from fighting. The son walks off, realizing he can never reveal what he has learned that night.

== Themes ==
The short story places heavy emphasis on the changes—both subtle and overt—brought on by the Korea War. It explores the breakdown of traditional Korean society, as seen with the disrespect shown to the father, the need-driven willingness of the mother to be exploited, and the amoral, war-driven entrepreneurial dealings of the boy. The short story has been cited as an example of cultural translation, as it blends cultural and literary tradition from both Korea and America while also segregating some aspects of both traditions.
