= Choe Jeong-hui =

South Korean writer (1912–1990)

- 최정희
- Born: December 3, 1912; Tanchon, Korea, Empire of Japan
- Died: December 21, 1990 (aged 78)
- Spouse: Kim Dong-hwan
- Children: Kim Ji-won, Kim Chae-won
- Writing career
- Language: Korean

Korean name
- Hangul: 최정희
- Hanja: 崔貞熙
- RR: Choe Jeonghui
- MR: Ch'oe Chŏnghŭi

Choe Jeong-hui (Korean: 최정희; Hanja: 崔貞熙; 1912–1990) was one of the most successful early women writers in South Korea.

== Life ==
Choe Jeong-hui was born in Dancheon, South Hamgyong Province and was educated in Seoul. She worked at a kindergarten in Tokyo and as a journalist in Seoul before starting her writing career in 1931; she worked for the magazine Samch'ŏlli and the newspaper The Chosun Ilbo. She was associated with the Korean Artists' Proletarian Federation, and was jailed in 1934 as a result.

Her daughters, Kim Ji-won and Kim Chae-won, were also successful writers. She first married filmmaker Kim Yu-yeong in 1930, but they divorced a year later when she met her second husband, Kim Dong-hwan, in 1931 while working for Samcheolli.

== Selected works ==
- Earthly Ties (지맥), novella
- Human Ties (인맥), novella
- Heavenly Ties (천맥), novella
