= Bang Young-ung =

South Korean novelist (1942–2022)

- Born: 20 July 1942; Yesan County, Chūseinan-dō, Korea, Empire of Japan
- Died: 31 August 2022 (aged 80)
- Writing career
- Language: Korean

- Bang Young-ung
- Hangul: 방영웅
- Hanja: 方榮雄
- RR: Bang Yeongung
- MR: Pang Yŏngung

Bang Young-ung (Korean: 방영웅; 20 July 1942 – 31 August 2022) was a South Korean novelist whose works focus on affectionately portraying the lives of ordinary people in contemporary South Korea.

== Life ==
Bang Yeong-ung was born on 20 July 1942 in Yesan, Chūseinan-dō, Korea, Empire of Japan. He graduated from Whimoon High School and made his debut with The Story of Bullye, published in the journal Creation and Criticism (Changjak gwa bipyeong) in 1967.

Bang died on 31 August 2022, at the age of 80.

== Work ==
Bang made his literary debut in 1968 with the novel The Story of Bullye (분례기) which was also made into a movie. Later novels include Moon (달, 1971), Stone Driven In and Stone Pulled Out (박힌돌과 뽑힌돌, 1980), and Keumjo Mountain (금조산, 1992). His early work focuses on rural life, but in the 1970s he shifted toward town and city milieux.

Bang deals with the lives of lower middle-class and working-class Koreans. His works from 1960s tend to be set in rural communities while those from 1970s have urban settings, but the characters they portray are basically similar: simple-hearted, tenacious people who may not emerge victorious, but who endure, like hearty wildflowers, lives filled with inconsolable sorrows and formidable adversities. In particular, the rural characters he sketches often find it impossible to accept any other life than the one they have always known; for this reason, they are tragically left behind in a rapidly changing world. A degree of fatalism can be detected in The Story of Bullye (Bullyegi, 1967) and The Moon (Dal), but certain hopefulness persists throughout the body of Bang Yeong-ung's work.

== Works in Korean ==
Novels

- The Story of Bullye (1968)
- Stone Driven In and Stone Pulled Out (1992)
- Keumjo Mountain (1992)

Short Stories

- Tales of Life (1974)
- First Snow (1976)

== Awards ==
- Hankook Ilbo Literary Award (1969)

== See also ==
- List of Korean novelists
- Korean literature
- Contemporary culture of South Korea
