= Yoo Hyeonjong =

South Korean novelist

- Writing career
- Language: Korean

Korean name
- Hangul: 유현종
- Hanja: 劉賢鍾
- RR: Yu Hyeonjong
- MR: Yu Hyŏnjong

Yoo Hyeonjong is a South Korean novelist whose works of dramatic historical fiction are well known in his native country.

== Life ==
A native of Jeonju, the capital of Jeollabuk-do province, Yoo was born into a family of the Gangneung Yu lineage (born 25 February 1939, although another source gives 1940) . With a degree in creative writing from Sorabol Arts College, in the province's former capital, Gwangju, he emerged on the literary stage when his short story, "This Insignificant Stone", received an award from the literary magazine Jayu Munhak.

== Work ==
“This Insignificant Stone” (Tteut isseulsu eomneun idolmaengi, 1961) is moving tale of wordless communication two Korean soldiers on the opposite sides of the demilitarized zone achieve through the medium of a curiously shaped stone. The work describes how an utterly ordinary and worthless object becomes endowed with great significance as it occasions contact between two people who must remain enemies. For this simple tale which nonetheless implies indirect criticism of the tragic reality of Korean division, Yoo Hyeonjong received the New Writer's Prize awarded by the journal Freedom Literature (Jayu munhak) in 1961, the year he graduated from the Creative Writing Department of Sorabol College of Arts.

Yoo Hyeonjong's later works, however, move toward greater theatricality and evince panoramic scope. “Giant” (Geoin), for example, features a protagonist who possesses almost super-human strength and will, and this type of larger-than-life hero makes nearly ubiquitous appearance in Yoo's historical novels. He tackled a wide range of characters and events in these lengthy sagas. Wildfire (Deul bul, 1975) deals with rebels of the Donghak Movement toward the end of the Joseon dynasty; Yeongaesomun (1978) depicts the heroic feats of Yeongaesomun, the famed general from the Goguryeo Kingdom; the checkered lives of itinerant acting troupe is the subject of Namsadang. In addition, he has written accounts of historical figures such as Goryeo monk and geomancer Myocheong, Silla period sea merchant Jang Bogo, mid-Joseon bandit Lim Kkeok-jeong, and late-Joseon painter Jang Seung-eop. Yoo Hyeonjong's penchant for high drama has led him to become a capable playwright as well: he has written plays Tale of an Yangban (Yangbanjeon) and A Puppeteer for Our Times (Urideurui gwangdaewon). Yoo Hyeonjong received Contemporary Literature Prize in 1969 and Korean Creative Writing Prize in 1976.

== Works in Korean ==
- City of Discontent, 1968 (불만의 도시)
- Wild Fire, 1975 (들불)
- Yongaesomun, 1978 (연개소문)
- The Three Elite Patrols, 1980 (삼별초)
- North Road to Mt. Heaven, 1980 (천산북로)
- Kings' Way, 1981 (왕도)
- Im Kkok-chong, 1986 (임꺽정)
- Chang Po-go, 1988 (장보고)
- Chonggam-nok, 1990 (정감록)
- Hwangsan, 1989 (황산)
- Taejoyoung, 1990 (대조영)

== Awards ==
- Hyundai Munhak Literary Prize, 1969
- Korean Fiction Prize, 1976

== See also ==
- List of Korean novelists
- Contemporary culture of South Korea
- Korean literature
