= Cheongnyeonsa =

Buddhist temple in Yeongdeok, South Korea

Cheongnyeon Temple

Religion
- Affiliation: Buddhism

Location
- Location: Deoksan-ri, Dalsan-myeon, Yeongdeok County, Gyeongsangbuk-do
- Country: South Korea
- Interactive map of Cheongnyeon Temple
- Coordinates: 36.3885°N 129.232°E

Architecture
- Elevation: 482 m (1,581 ft)

Korean name
- Hangul: 청련사
- Hanja: 靑蓮寺
- RR: Cheongnyeonsa
- MR: Ch'ŏngnyŏnsa

Cheongnyeonsa is a temple located in Yeongdeok County, Gyeongsangbuk-do, South Korea.
