= Yi In-seong =

South Korean writer (born 1953)

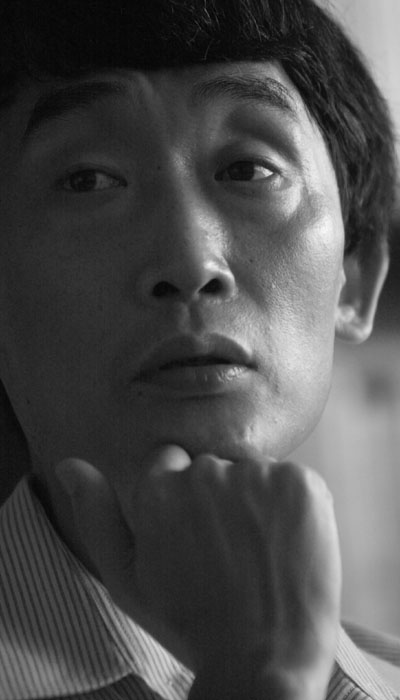
- Born: December 9, 1953 (age 72)
- Education: Seoul National University
- Writing career
- Language: Korean

Korean name
- Hangul: 이인성
- Hanja: 李仁星
- RR: I Inseong
- MR: I Insŏng

Yi In-seong (Korean: 이인성; Hanja: 李仁星; born December 9, 1953) is a South Korean modern novelist.

== Biography ==
Yi In-seong was born on December 9, 1953, in Chinhae Kyongsangnam-do, in Korea. His father, Lee Ki-baek is a leading South Korean historian. Yi was raised by a family of academics and as a teenager embraced aestheticism and began to work on his own writing. Yi graduated from Seoul National University with a BA in French Literature and an MA in French Literature. While at Seoul National University, Yi established the literary magazine Linguistic Explorations.

Yi In-Seong went on to become a professor at Hankook University of Foreign Studies.

== Work ==
With a spirit of experimentation, Yi In-seong has consistently challenged the narrative grammar of realism and conventional assumptions regarding the relationship between the author, the text, and the reader. Into the Unfamiliar Time (Natseon sigan sogeuro, 1983), Yi In-seong's first novel, tells the familiar story of a young man's wanderings, but employs narrative techniques designed to defamiliarize the depicted reality, such as blending of tenses, fusion of fantasy and reality, and overlapping of time sequences. "The Tomb of the Years Past" (Geu seworui mudeom, 1987) and "Now He is in Front of Me" (Jigeum geuga nae apeseo) also employ some of these techniques to give shape to the inner consciousness of his characters. What Yi In-seong seeks to problematize is the perceived stability of the dichotomy between the performer and the spectator, the writer and the reader of the text, and ultimately the self and the other. In "About You" (Dangsine daehaeseo) and "My Statement for Your Interrogation" (Dangsinui simmune daehan naui jagi jinsul), the author plays with various personal pronouns in order to deconstruct the stability of separate identities. Through such experiments, Lee Inseong attempts to heighten readers' consciousness and engage them more actively in the act of reading. Recognizing the violence implicit in language, these works dismantle established ways of reading and the habits of thought associated with such conventions.

== Works in translation ==
- On You (2013)
- Jahreszeiten Des Exils (낯선 시간 속으로) (1983)
- SEPT MEANDRES POUR UNE ILE (강 어귀에 섬 하나) (1999)

== Works in Korean (Partial) ==
Collections

- Endlessly Low Breath (Haneopsi Najeun Sumgyeol, 한없이 낮은 숨결 1989)
- Imagining the Last Courtship (Majimak Yeonaeui Sangsang, 마지막 연애의 상상) (1992)

Critical Study

- Study on Molière entitled Comedy of Festival (Chukjee gwanhan huigeuk).
