= Kim Chae-won (writer) =

South Korean author (born 1946)

- Born: Deokso, Korea
- Died: 1946 (age 79–80)
- Education: Ewha Womans University
- Occupation: Writer
- Writing career
- Language: Korean
- Period: 1975-present
- Genre: Fiction

- Korean name
- Hangul: 김채원
- Hanja: 金采原
- RR: Gim Chaewon
- MR: Kim Ch'aewŏn

Kim Chae-won (Korean: 김채원; born 1946) is a South Korean author best known for the dreamlike quality of her prose.

== Life ==
Kim Chae-won was born in Deokso, Gyeonggi Province in 1946. She studied painting at Ewha Womans University. Her father is the poet Kim Dong-hwan, one of Korea's foremost modernist poets (he wrote Korea's first modern epic, Night at the Border), and her mother is the novelist Choe Jeong-hui. Kim grew up with her older sister under the care of her mother after her father was kidnapped by the North Korean government during the political turmoil after the Korean War. Her older sister Kim Ji-won is also a novelist, and both sisters have received the respected Yi Sang Literary Award. They have collaborated on the short story collections Faraway House Faraway Sea and Home, She Was Not There. Kim Chae-won's childhood growing up without a father has had a direct and indirect effect on her work. In Kim's novels her father is depicted as a victim of Korea's tragic history. The remaining family copes with his absence and decline, becoming tragic victims themselves. The pain and lack in the family that comes with the father's absence and decline becomes rooted as a trauma that controls their lives thereon. The examination of how this trauma may be internalized and sublimated is the subject of Kim's most important literary achievement, the “Hallucination” series. The wounds of Korea's modern history are thus at the bottom of Kim's work characterized by its fantastical and dreamlike aesthetic.

== Work ==
Kim made her literary debut in 1975 with “Greetings at Night” (Baminsa), published in the journal, Contemporary Literature (Hyeondae munhak). Among her major works are “The Hand of the Moon” (Darui son), “Ice House” (Eoreum jip), “Honeymoon” (Mirwol), “A Green Hat” (Chorok bit moja), “Mountain Diary” (Sanjunggi), “The Breath of May” (Oworui sumgyeol), “Summer Fantasy” (Yeoreumui hwan), and “A Wordless Song” (Mueonga.

Kim's writing is confessional and first-person, featuring a single subjective gaze. Her characters often feel helpless and lost, often juxtaposing present experiences with memories in an evocative rather than declarative way.

== Awards ==
In 1989 she was awarded the Yi Sang Literary Award for “Winter Fantasy”.

== Works in translation ==
- Wintervision (German)
- Espejismos de otoño (Spanish)
- Contos contemporâneos Coreanos (Portuguese)

== Works in Korean (partial) ==
- The Hand of the Moon (Darui son)
- Ice House (Eoreum jip)
- Honeymoon (Mirwol)
- A Green Hat (Chorok bit moja)
- Mountain Diary (Sanjunggi)
- The Breath of May (Oworui sumgyeol)
- Summer Fantasy (Yeoreumui hwan)
- A Wordless Song (Mueonga)
