= Kim Mi-wol =

Korean writer (born 1977)

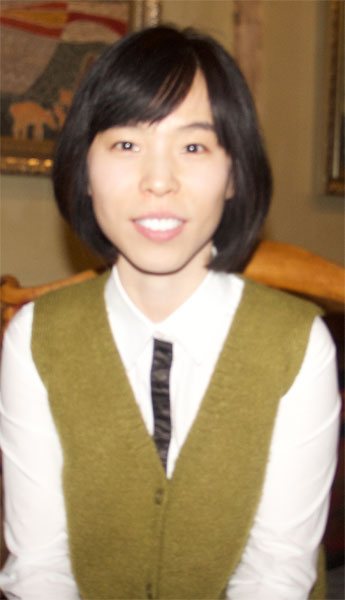
- Kim Mi-wol at China Cafe, Gwangwhamun Station, Seoul
- Born: 1977 (age 48–49)
- Writing career
- Language: Korean
- Period: Modern
- Notable work: What Has Yet to Happen

Korean name
- Hangul: 김미월
- RR: Gim Miwol
- MR: Kim Miwŏl

Kim Mi-wol (Korean: 김미월; born 1977) is a South Korean writer of fiction.

== Life ==
Kim Mi-wol was born in 1977 in Gangneung in the Gangwon province of South Korea. Her father was a public servant and so she moved, along with his job, to Hongcheon for middle school. Unusually, she enjoyed, saying, "I liked moving to a new school. The excitement of encountering something new was overwhelming. The sadness of separation from things that were familiar paled in comparison."

Kim became a writer, she says, because "when the book I was reading had an ending that I did not like, I would re-write the conclusion of as I see It fit. Little Women, A Dog of Flanders, Sonagi (by Hwang Soon Won) and Tess are some of the examples. Considering the examples are all tragic stories, I must have preferred a happy ending even in my younger years.

She attended a secondary school for girls in Chuncheon. She then moved to Seoul and got a degree from Korea University in Linguistics and a degree at the University of the Arts in Seoul in creative writing. She made her literary debut in 2004 with her work "Think Your Way Through the Garden" (Jeongwone gireul mutda) published in the newspaper Segye Ilbo. She has received the Munhakdongne Young Writers Award three times (2010, 2012, 2013).

== Work ==
While Kim made her debut with "Think Your Way Through The Garden" she was initially most recognized for “Guide to Seoul Cave” the eponymous short story from her first collection which was published in 2007. The story deals with the isolation of modern individuals, adrift in society at large. Her tone shifted in her first novel “The Eighth Room,” (2010) which was both warm and funny in describing the position of young adults in the modern world. Later on, her work narrowed, dealing with characters who lived largely within themselves and replaced personal relationships with relationships with various objects, creating for themselves a kind of "virtual paradise".

As demonstrated in her work "What Has Yet To Happen," Kim writes about young Koreans isolated in minimal spaces in which they embrace the reality that solitude is inescapable. Loneliness, is not unusual, in fact it is inescapable and the only answer to this fact is in an existential aesthetic - not some strong will that overpowers all weakness, rather the narrower struggle to create an autonomous space by essentially embracing detachment and indifference.

== Awards ==
- 2014 22nd Today's Young Artist Award
- 2013 4th Munhakdongne Young Writers Award
- 2012 3rd Munhakdongne Young Writers Award
- 2011 29th Shin Dong-yup Literary Award
- 2010 1st Munhakdongne Young Writers Award

== Works in English ==
- What Has Yet to Happen (ASIA Publishers, 2014)
- Guide to Seoul Cave (PDF - Brother Anthony)

== Works in Korean ==
- Seoul Cave Guide
- The 8th Room
- The Unopened Book
- What Has Yet to Happen
