= Cho Seon-jak =

South Korean writer

- Born: November 13, 1940 (age 85)
- Occupation: Novelist
- Writing career
- Period: 1940-present
- Genre: Modern Korean Fiction
- Notable works: The Preview and Other Stories

- Cho Seon-jak
- Hangul: 조선작
- RR: Jo Seonjak
- MR: Cho Sŏnjak

Cho Seon-jak (born 1940) (Korean: 조선작) is a South Korean writer.

== Life ==
Cho Seon-jak was born in Daejeon, South Korea. Cho Seonjak graduated from Daejeon Teachers' School and debuted with The Tomb of the Patriots (Jisachong), which was published in Generation (Sedae). The Tomb of the Patriots won Generation's top writing prize in 1971 and was also adapted as a TV drama by MBC television in South Korea.

== Life ==
Cho's works focus on the injustice inherent in social structure, and his work often focused on social outcasts. Yeongja’s Heyday (Yeongjaui jeonseongsidae) features prostitutes and other social outcasts as central characters to investigate social injustice and High Voltage Wire (Goapseon) indirectly probes into the hidden forces threatening the everyday life of common men. Heyday was also made into a feature film, which is collected in the Korean Film Archives "100 Korean Movies."

Cho Seon-jak’s work depicts without bias the wretchedness of lives victimized by industrialization and rapid economic growth of the 1970s.

The Korea Literature Translation Institute sums up his work:

The injustice woven into the very structure of society, as can be seen in the difficult lives of the social outcasts, forms the thematic basis for Cho Seonjak’s works. Despite the gravity of the subject matter, Cho is able to incorporate witty, entertaining expressions into the narrative. Yeongja’s Heyday (Yeongjaui jeonseongsidae) features prostitutes and other social outcasts as central characters to investigate social injustice and High Voltage Wire (Goapseon) indirectly probes into the hidden forces threatening the everyday life of common men. Cho Seonjak’s work depicts without bias the wretchedness of lives victimized by industrialization and rapid economic growth of the 1970.

Some praised Cho for his honesty, while others attacked him as a sensationalist. In the introduction to The Preview and Other Stories, the editors not that the latter response seem to have come largely from the very members of society that Cho portrayed as callously ignoring the suffering of the marginalized.

== Work ==
=== Works in English ===
- The Preview and Other Stories by Cho Sun-jak, Trans. Kim Young Chan, David C. Carter, 2003

=== Works in Korean (partial) ===
Novels

- Yeongja’s Heyday (Yeongjaui jeonseongsidae, 1973)
- Slaughter Without Permission (Mildosal, 1973)
- Gleaning Women (Yeoja jupgi, 1974)
- Gyeongja’s Nose (Gyeongjaui ko, 1974)
- Water in the Field Outside (Oeyasu, 1974)
- Art Contest (Misul daehoe, 1974)
- Looking for Father (Abeoji chatgi, 1975)
- Annihilation (Choto, 1978)
- Fetters (Gullae, 1987)

Short story collections

- In the Field Outside (Oeyaeseo)
- Perfect Love (Wanjeonhan sarang)
- Loneliness of a Pole Bolt Jumper (Jangdaenopittuigi seonsuui godok)
- Chains of Melancholy (Usuui saseul)
