= An Sugil =

Korean novelist and journalist

- Hangul: 안수길
- Hanja: 安壽吉
- RR: An Sugil
- MR: An Sugil

Ahn Soo-kil (1911–1977) was a Korean novelist and journalist who devoted much of his life to depicting the lives of the Korean settlers in Jiandao, Manchuria.

== Life ==
An Sugil (sobriquet: Namseok) was born on November 3, 1911, in Hamhung, Korea, Empire of Japan. His family relocated to Manchuria when he was eleven and returned to their hometown after he finished middle school. In 1927, An withdrew from Hamheung High School after leading a student protest, and transferred to Kyungshin School in Seoul. He was arrested and eventually expelled for his involvement with the Gwangju Student Movement. In 1931, he enrolled in the Teachers' College of Waseda University in Tokyo in the 1930s, but soon withdrew and returned to Korea.

== Work ==
First introduced in his novella Rice Plant (Byeo), Manchuria represents the frontier in An Sugil's literary world, where the Korean peasants, ruthlessly driven out of their homeland by the Japanese colonial policies, must once again face poverty and inequality in addition to new challenges posed by the hostile natives and unfamiliar surroundings. Their plight, however, is dignified by the pioneer spirit, the love of land and labor as well as intense nationalism rooted in the longing for the lost fatherland. These qualities distinguish An Sugil's work from other immigrant tales set in Manchuria, such as Choi Seohae's "Red Flame" (Hongyeom) and Lee Taejun's "The Farmer" (Nonggun). In Ahn's first collection of short stories, Northern Plain (Bugwon, 1943), problems relating to the establishment of a Korean school overshadows the conflict with the natives as the main source of strife in immigrant life. Manchuria is also the setting for his best-known work, North Jiando (Bukgando, 1959–1967), a family saga in five volumes that spans some eighty years from the end of Joseon Dynasty to the end of the Japanese occupation period. A product of the author's penetrating historical consciousness, the novel realistically chronicles the plight of an immigrant family, which in turn mirrors the experience of the Korean people in general in the early modern period. It is regarded as a landmark in the genre of roman-fleuve.

With the publication of A Third Type of Man (Jesam inganhyeong, 1954), which includes the eponymous short-story as well as "A Traveler's Loneliness" (Yeosu) and "Green Chrysanthemum" (Chwiguk), An Sugil moved away from stories of immigrants to investigate the deterioration of social and individual morality during and after the Korean War. Written Conversation on First Love (Choyeon pildam, 1955), examines the reality of urban working-class.

== Works in Translation ==
- Eine Unmögliche Liebe (안수길 소설선)

== Works in Korean ==
- Garland of Flowers (Hwahwan, 1955)
- The Second Youth (Je 2-ui cheongchun, 1958)
- North Jiando, (Bukgando, 1959)
- Hwang Jini (1977)
- Pear Blossoms in the Moonlit Night (Yihwaae wolbaekhago, 1978)
- Pathway (Tongno, 1985)
- The Story of Northern Hometown (Bukhwangbo, 1987)

== Awards ==
- 1955: Asian Liberty Literature Prize
- 1968: Seoul Cultural Award
- 1973: Samil Prize

== See also ==
- List of Korean novelists
- Korean literature
