= Gong Seon-ok =

South Korean writer

- 공선옥
- Born: 1963 (age 62–63)
- Occupation: Author

Korean name
- Hangul: 공선옥
- RR: Gong Seonok
- MR: Kong Sŏnok

Gong Seon-ok (born 1963) is a modern South Korean writer.

== Life ==
Gong was born in Gokseong County, South Jeolla Province, South Korea. Her father, who abandoned the family early on, led a wandering existence in order to evade creditors, and her mother suffered from weak health. Although Gong was accepted into university, she was ultimately forced to leave because she could not afford the tuition and made a living by working as a factory hand and long-distance express bus attendant.

== Work ==
Gong portrays traditional life in rural areas in reflection of her hometown in the southern Jeolla province Gong debuted in 1991 with her novella "Seeds of Fire." Gong's female characters reside at the bottom of the socioeconomic ladder, including the girl in "That’s Life," a squatter living in a freezing derelict apartment building without heat or electricity who ultimately loses her life in a butane gas accident.

The city of Gwangju is another reoccurring motif in Gong's work. Her husband is a survivor of the Gwangju uprising, a pro-democracy movement suppressed by the South Korean government in 1980. Gong lived not far from the scene of the protest and the university she briefly attended was also in Gwangju. Gong's debut work "Seeds of Fire" portrays the harrowing experience and resulting trauma of the men who had taken part in the Gwangju Democratization Movement. Her key works including the short stories "A Thirsty Season," "Alibi for the Next Season," and the novel When I Was Most Beautiful are also set in Gwangju. In her work, Gong portrays the sorrow and loss of Gwangju citizens who have personally experienced these atrocities.

== Works in translation ==
- «Приходите на поле гаоляна» (Russian)
- 《请到玉米地来》 (Chinese)
- "The Flowering of Our Lives" (우리 생애 의 꽃; uli saeng-ae ui kkoch) (in The Future of Silence: Fiction By Korean Women)
- "Wandering Family" (유랑가족; Yuranggajok)
- "La familia itinerante" (Spanish)

== Works in Korean (partial) ==
- My Thirties Left Behind in Oji-ri (오지리에 두고 온 서른살; Ojiri-e du-go on seoreunsal; 1993)
- Bloom, Daffodil (피어라 수선화; Pieora suseonhwa; 1994)
- The Flowering of Our Lives (우리 생애 의 꽃; uli saeng-ae ui kkoch; 1994)
- Alibi for the Next Life (내 생의 알리바이; Nae saeng-ui allibai; 1998)
- A Wonderful World (멋진 한 세상; Meotjin han sesang; 2002)
- Come to the Sorghum Field (수수밭 으로 오세요; Susubat-euro oseyo; 2002)
- Wandering Family (유랑가족; Yuranggajok; 2005)
- Merrily Through the Night (명랑한 밤길; Myeongnanghan bamgil; 2007)
- When I Was Most Beautiful (내가 가장 예뻣을 때; Nae-ga gajang Yeppeosseul ddae; 2009)
- Flowery Days (꽃 같은 시절; kkoch gat-eun sijeol; 2011)

== Awards ==
- Women News Literature Prize (1992)
- Shin Dongyeop Writing Award (1995)
- Today's Young Artist Award (2004)
- This Year's Literary Prize (Olhaemunhaksang 2005)
- Baek Sangae Literature Prize (2008)
- Manhae Literature Prize (2009)
- Oh Yeongsu Literature Prize (2009)
- Catholic Literature Prize (2009)
- Yosan Literature Prize (2011)

== See also ==
- Korean literature
- List of Korean novelists
