= Lee Mankyo =

South Korean writer (born 1967)

- Born: 1967 (age 58–59)
- Writing career
- Language: Korean

Korean name
- Hangul: 이만교
- RR: I Mangyo
- MR: I Man'gyo

Lee Mankyo (Korean: 이만교; born 1967) is a South Korean writer, whose works have been turned into Korean films.

== Work ==
Lee's work covers various happenings in the lives of ordinary urbanites. The topics are often of serious nature entailing many social implications, yet the style is lighthearted and jovial. In Marriage Is an Act of Madness, Lee's most well-known novel which was made into a movie by the same title. Another full-length novel, Will You Come To Meokko's House To Play? portrays family dynamics during the IMF crisis of 1997.

Lee has stated that for him “any object, person or situation characterized by authority, exclusivity or piety excites a desire to make light of them--to make them laugh, or make them an object of laughter." In Lee's view, the natural beauty inherent in family life and the institution of marriage are distorted by the greed for power which guises itself as concern for order and communal good. For this reason, children play a central role in many of Lee's fiction: the hypocrisy dominating the adult world is rendered particularly odious when even a child's innocence becomes infected with it.

== Works in Korean (partial) ==
Novels

- Marriage is Madness (2000)
- Will You Come Play at Meokko's House (2001)
- Children Cannot Suppress Laughter (2003)

Short Stories

- Bad Woman, Good Man (2003)
