= Kim Haki =

- Born: June 24, 1958 (age 68); Ulsan, South Korea
- Writing career
- Language: Korean

- Korean name
- Hangul: 김하기
- RR: Gim Hagi
- MR: Kim Hagi

Kim Haki (Korean: 김하기; born June 24, 1958) is a modern South Korean writer and ex political-prisoner.

== Life ==
Kim Haki was born on June 24, 1958 in Ulsan, Gyeongsangnam-do, South Korea. Kim attended Busan National University, and after participating in the student movement was arrested in 1980 for demonstrating against the expansion of Korean Martial Law. Involved in the Burim incident, Kim was sentenced to ten years in prison, of which he served eight years, and was released in 1988.

== Life ==
After his release from prison Kim became a full-time writer when he published A Young Man Imprisoned, which was a collection of poems and letters he had composed while being imprisoned. In 1989, his story Living Tomb was published in the Changbi Magazine. Kim's short story collection Complete Union won the first Im Sygyeong Unification Literary Award and in 1992 he received the 10th Shing Dong-yeop Creative Fund for Writers Prize. Some critics have characterized Kims criticized his works as being too schematic; however Kim has certainly publicized the problem of long-term prisoners through his works.

== Works ==
=== Collection of Novels ===
- 《A Perfect Encounter》, Changbi Publishers, (완전한 만남, 1991)
- 《A Ginkgo Love》, Practical Literature Company, (은행나무 사랑, 1996)
- 《A Peach Blossom Place》, Munhak dongne, (복숭아꽃 그자리, 2002)

=== Novels ===
- 《A Flight Without a Course(Part 1)》, Changbi Publishers, (항로 없는 비행(상), 1993)
- 《A Flight Without a Course(Part 2)》, Changbi Publishers, (항로 없는 비행(하), 1993)
- 《A Thousand Years of Light 1 ~ 3》, Go-Do, (천년의 빛, 2001)

=== Etc ===
- 《A Late Bloomer》, Peer-to-book, (늦깎이, 1991)
- 《Finally Standing at the End of the Fence》, Munhak dongne, (마침내 철책 끝에 서다, 1995)
- 《Bu-Ma Democratic Protests (Re-read History 4)》, Korea Democracy Foundation, (부마민주항쟁, 2004)

== Works in Translation ==
- Ginko Love

== Awards ==
- Im Sugyeong Unification Literary Award
- Shing Dong-yeop Creative Fund for Writers Prize (1992)
