= Hailji =

- Born: 1955 (age 70–71)
- Citizenship: South Korean
- Education: Poitiers University (M.A.); University of Limoges (Ph.D.)
- Writing career
- Language: Korean

- Korean name
- Hangul: 하일지
- RR: Ha Ilji
- MR: Ha Ilchi

Hailji is a modern South Korean writer whose series of "Racetrack" novels created controversy in Korea.

== Life ==
Hailji was born in 1955 and graduated from Jungang University with a degree in Creative Writing. He then taught high school until 1983, when he left South Korea for France. In France he earned an M.A. from Poitiers University and a Ph.D. from University of Limoges. He returned to South Korea in 1989. His career as an author began with the publication of his controversial, The Road to Racetracks. Many of his works have been made into movies or plays. As such, Ha is also credited as an important contributor to the development of modern Korean cinema.

== Work ==
Hailji's first book, 'The Road to Racetracks brought him immediate fame as well as a share of notoriety. The novel centers on an intellectual who has just returned from France and portrays the gradual crumbling of his world—both internal and external—as he struggles with hypocritical standards and conservative values of the Korean society.

In the next three years, Ha published four novels, and is in fact known as unique in South Korea for only publishing novels His next novels were, Racetracks at Crossroads, For Racetracks, An Alder Tree at the Racetracks, What Happened at the Racetracks—all of which shocked the South Korean literary world with their unique and innovative approach towards contradictions in life. Critical assessment of his works varies from one extreme to the other, and Ha became embroiled in a series of debates with conservative literary critics—now widely known as the “Racetrack Controversy.” His subsequent works are characterized by fantastic or dreamy atmosphere and have helped to secure him a readership of avid admirers.

Many of his works have been made into movies or plays. As such, Ha is also credited as an important contributor to the development of modern South Korean cinema. In 1993, he published a ciné-romans entitled Mano Cabina Remembered. Ha is also active as a poet. A volume of his English poems, Blue Meditation of the Clocks, was published in the U.S. in 1994, and in 2003, his French poems were published in Paris under the title Les Hirondelles dans mon tiroir. He may be the only writer in Korea who has written and published his works in many different languages.

== Works in translation ==
- La confesión (진술)
- Blue Meditation of the Clocks (1994)
- Les Hirondelles dans mon tiroir (2003)
- The Republic of Užupis: A Novel (2014)

== Works in Korean (partial) ==
- The Road to Racetracks (Gyeongmajang ganeun gil, 1990),
- Racetracks at Crosscroads (Gyeongmajang-eun negeorieseo, 1991)
- For Racetracks (Gyeongmanjang-eul wihayeo, 1991)
- An Alder Tree at the Racetracks (Gyeongmajangeui orinamu, 1992)
- What Happened at the Racetracks (Gyeongmajang-eseo saenggin il, 1993)
- He Asked Me If I Knew Jita (Geuneun naege jitareul anenyago muleotda, 1994)
- Dangerous Alibi (Wiheomhan allibai, 1995)
- Bird (Sae, 1999), Statement (Jinsul, 2000)
