= Yun Young-su =

South Korean writer (born 1952)

Yun Young-su (Korean: 윤영수; born 1952) is a South Korean writer.

== Life ==
Yun Young-su was born in 1952 in Dongsung-dong, Jongno-gu, Seoul, South Korea. She graduated from Gyeonggi Girls’ Middle School and Gyeonggi Girls’ High School. In 1975, she graduated from Seoul National University in historical education. Afterwards, she became a teacher at Yeouido Middle School. In 1979, she transferred to Daebang Girls’ Middle School before stopping teaching in 1980. She began writing in 1987, when she took a fiction writing class at the Culture and Arts Foundation. In 1990, when she was thirty eight, her short story “Saengtaegwanchal” (생태관찰 Ecology observation) was published in Modern Fiction and won the Modern Literature New Writer’s Prize. Later, she pursued an active career, publishing various collections such as Jaringobiui jukeumeul aedoham (자린고비의 죽음을 애도함 Mourning the death of a miser), Nae yeojachingu-ui gwi-yeoun yeonae (내 여자친구의 귀여운 연애 The cute dating life of my girlfriend), and Gwigado (귀가도 Come back home). In 1997, her story “Chakhan saram Mun Seonghyeon” (착한 사람 문성현 Kind Mun Seonghyeon) won the 30th Hankook Ilbo Literary Award. In 2008, her collection Nae anui hwangmuji (내 안의 황무지 The desert inside me) won the 3rd Namchon Literature Prize, and in the same year she won the 23rd Manhae Literature Prize with her collection Soseol sseuneun bam (소설 쓰는 밤 A night of writing fiction).

== Writing ==
Yun has mostly dealt with stories of those cast out from Korean society such as the sick, the crippled, gangsters, the disabled, and women, as well as with relationships of families that are on the brink of breakdown. Mun Seonghyeon, the protagonist of "Chakhan saram Mun Seonghyeon" (착한 사람 문성현 Kind Mun Seonghyeon) is born with a disability. Literary critic Shin Seungyeop has said that “through the invisible paradox of the novel that such human dignity is realized through the special condition of a mentally disabled protagonist, this work is even more of a shock to us the reader,” and he pointed out that this “shines even brighter when in contrast with so many other characters who are crumpling without any dignity due to the destructive for of capitalism.”

== Works ==
- Chakhan saram Mun Seonghyeon (착한 사람 문성현 Kind Mun Seonghyeon), Changbi, 1997.
- Jaringobiui jukeumeul aedoham (자린고비의 죽음을 애도함 Mourning the Death of a Miser), Changbi, 1998.
- Jukum, aju natjeun hwansang (죽음, 아주 낮은 환상 Death, a Very Low Fantasy), Yunkeom, 1998.
- Soseol sseuneun bam (소설 쓰는 밤 A Night of Writing Fiction), Random House Korea, 2006.
- Yun Yeong-su Fiction Set – 2 Volumes - Nae yeojachingu-ui gwi-yeoun yeonae (내 여자친구의 귀여운 연애 The cute dating life of my girlfriend) + Nae anui hwangmuji (내 안의 황무지 The desert inside me), Minumsa, 2007.
- Saranghara, huimangeopsi (사랑하라 희망없이 Love, Hopelessly), Minumsa, 2008.
- Gwigado (귀가도 Come back home), Munhakdongne, 2011.
- Sumeun Goljjagiui Danoungnamu Hangeuru (숨은 골짜기의 단풍나무 한 그루), Yeollimwon, 2018.

=== Works in translation ===
- "Secret Lover" in Azalea: Journal of Korean Literature & Culture Volume 3, 2010 (English)
- Love, Hopelessly, Asia Publishers, 2017 (English)

== Awards ==
- 1990 Modern Literature New Writer’s Prize
- 1997 30th Hankook Ilbo Literary Award
- 2008 3rd Namchon Literature Prize
- 2008 23rd Manhae Literature Prize
- 2011 The Violet Cultural Literary Prize
