= Kim Ewhan =

South Korean writer (born 1978)

- Born: 1978 (age 47–48)
- Occupation: Writer
- Writing career
- Pen name: Colin
- Period: 2004-
- Genres: science fiction, fantasy
- Notable work: The Orb of Despair

Kim Ewhan (Korean: 김이환; born 1978) is a South Korean science fiction and fantasy writer and indie film critic. His debut novel, The Ghosts of Evithezen (에비터젠의 유령) was a finalist of the National Fantasy Award. He is the winner of Multi Literary Award in 2009 with his novel The Orb of Despair (절망의 구).

He is a fan of writers Robert Heinlein, Roger Zelazny, Joanne Rowling, Yann Martel, Virginia Woolf, Haruki Murakami, and Ray Bradbury.

== Writing ==
Kim started writing after his graduation of Kyunghee University. His debut novel, The Ghosts of Evithezen, was a finalist for the National Fantasy Award. In 2009, his novel, The Orb of Despair, won the first Multi Literary Award. As the award was organized by SBS, Showbox, and Wisdom House, the major players of the media and entertainment industry, this win was a breakout for his career. The Orb of Despair is translated into nine languages. His stories are known for its special taste of mixture of science fiction and fantasy.

Besides fiction, he was a regular contributor for the magazines Indi Movies and Cine 21. When writing file reviews, he uses his pen name Colin, which he quotes from the Irish actor Colin Farrell.

== Works ==
- 북극곰 일기 Diary of Polar Bear (2014)
- 디저트 월드 Dessert World (2014)
- 오픈 Open (2013)
- 동네전쟁 Town Wars (2011)
- 귀여우니까 괜찮아 Too Cute to be of Fault (2011)
- 뱀파이어 나이트 Vampire Night (2010)
- 집으로 돌아가는 길 The Way Back Home (2010)
- 절망의 구 The Orb of Despair (2009); English translation The Black Orb (2025)
- 오후 다섯 시의 외계인 The Alien at Five O'Clock (2008)
- 양말 줍는 소년 Socks Pickup Boy (2007)
- 정크 Junk (2006)
- 에비터젠의 유령 The Ghosts of Evithezen (2004)

== Awards ==
- 2017: SF Award
- 2010: Young Writers Award Your Metamorphosis
- 2009: Multi Literary Award The Orb of Despair
