= Sim Yunkyung =

South Korean writer (born 1972)

- Born: 1972 (age 53–54)
- Education: Seoul National University
- Writing career
- Language: Korean

Korean name
- Hangul: 심윤경
- RR: Sim Yungyeong
- MR: Sim Yun'gyŏng

Sim Yunkung (Korean: 심윤경; born 1972) is a South Korean writer.

== Life ==
Sim Yunkung was born in 1972 in Seoul, Korea. Sim Yungyeong majored in molecular biology at Seoul National University and went on to complete her graduate studies there. Sim also worked for some time at a business incubator in the field of molecular biology. Her writing career began informally when, after marriage and childbirth, she started a “baby blog” on the Internet and lived as an ordinary mother of an infant. Then however, she debuted in 2002 when she won the 7th Hankyoreh Literature Prize with her novel My...Beautiful...Garden and embarked on a colorful literary career.

== Work ==
Set between 1977 and 1981, My Beautiful Garden depicts the emotional growth of a dyslexic boy named Dong-gu. The political upheavals during this period—the 1979 assassination of late President Park Chung-hee and 1980 military coup and Gwangju Democratization Movement—are related through Dong-gu, who lives in a neighborhood near the Presidential Mansion. Sim's second novel, Moon Alter, takes place in Andong of North Gyeongsang Province, which is considered to be the seat of traditional patriarchy. Sim also wrote a linked-story collection The People of Sorabol, which portrays important historical figures from more than a thousand years ago in an erotic and grotesque light.

The Korea Literature Translation Institute summarizes her work:

One of the characteristics of Sim’s fiction is her tendency toward tragic conclusions. In My Beautiful Garden, Dong-gu’s younger sister Yeongju dies in an accident he inadvertently caused, and the teacher who befriends Dong-gu goes missing during the Gwangju uprising. In Moon Alter, when Sangryong discovers an ugly family secret, he offers himself as a sacrifice. In Sim’s third novel, The Love of Yi Hyeon, the main character Yi Hyeon and Yi Jin get married despite opposition, but the story ends in tragedy with the death of Yi Jin.

Rather than relying on her personal experience, Sim prefers to utilize her imagination and thorough research skills to achieve vividness and credibility for her fiction. Her ability to transform new information and research into authentic characters and situations is truly outstanding to the extent that many people mistake My Beautiful Garden for an autobiographical work, and even critics, after reading Moon Alter, are often shocked when they learn that she has spent her entire life in Seoul.

Sim’s abundant imagination was once again at play in her linked story collection The People of Sorabol, which portrays important historical figures from more than a thousand years ago in an erotic and grotesque light.

Sim has won two major literary awards, the Hankyoreh Literary Award (한겨레문학상) in 2002 and the Muyeong Literary Award (무영문학상) in 2005. Her most recent novel is Love Runs. Which Plus List describes as being about "people who are faithful to their desires and remain immature. This work was not only popular as a book, but is also under active conversation for conversion to a movie as it wasfeatured at the Asian Film Market's event Book To Film 2012, which featured her work Love Runs.

== Works in Korean (partial) ==
=== Novels ===
- My Beautiful Garden (2002)
- Moon Alter (2004)
- The Love of Yi Hyeon (2006)
- Love Runs (2012)

=== Linked stories ===
- The People of Sorabol (2008)

== Awards ==
- Hankyoreh Literary Award (한겨레문학상, 2002)
- Muyeong Literary Award (무영문학상, 2005)
