= Lee Dong-ha =

South Korean novelist (born 1942)

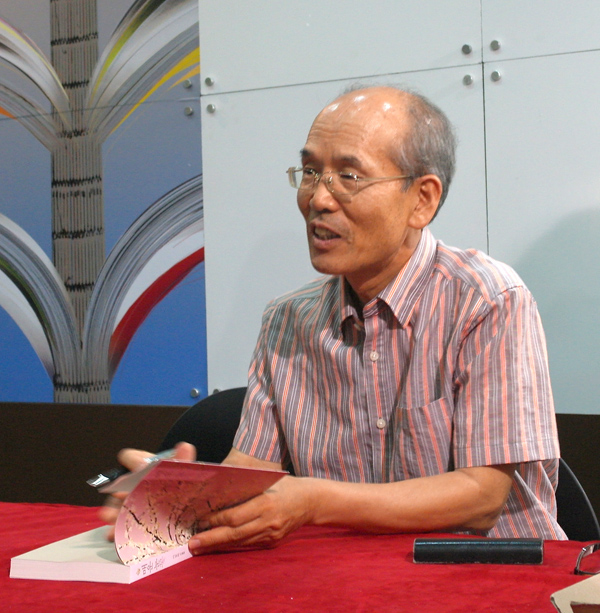
- Born: December 1, 1942 (age 83)
- Occupation: Novelist

- Korean name
- Hangul: 이동하
- Hanja: 李東河
- RR: I Dongha
- MR: I Tongha

Lee Dong-ha (born December 1, 1942) is a South Korean novelist.

== Life ==
Lee Dong-Ha was born in Osaka, Japan and moved to Korea with his family after Korea's liberation from the Japanese. There, he grew up in Gyeongsan, North Gyeongsang Province. He graduated from the Creative Writing Department at the Seorabeol College of Arts and received a graduate degree in Korean Literature from Konkuk University in 1967. He later served as a professor at Chung-Ang University.

== Work ==
His writing career began in 1966 when he won an award from a Seoul Newspaper. Some of the works he has authored include Toy City, a semi-autobiographical novel in three parts, and Shrapnel, a collection of short stories about post-war South Korea. He has won several awards including the Korean Fiction Award (1977), Korean Creative Writing Award (1981), Korean Writers' Award (1983) and the Contemporary Literature (Hyundae Munhak) Award (1986). He was the first recipient of the O Yeong-su Literature Award in 1993.

His works focus on the damage done to a nation that has endured the trauma of internecine strife and division by forces that were outside of its control. Even when economic success comes, it cannot overcome that trauma and the inevitable dissolution of thousands of years of tradition.

== Works in Translation ==
- A Toy City
- Shrapnel And Other Stories

== Works in Korean ==
- Composition 1", “White Landscape” (Hayan punggyeong)
- Calculations" (Gyesanhagi)
- “A Portrait of Today” (Oneurui chosang)
- “How to Climb Over the Alps” (Alpeuseureul neomneun beop)
- “Vacation and a Bonus” (Hyugawa bouneoseu)
- "A Summer Day” (Hail)
- “A Stone” (Dol)
- “Snow” (Nun)
- “Bird” (Sae).

Anthologies

- Toy City (Jangnangam dosi, 1982)
- Valley at Dark (Jeomun goljjagi, 1986),
- A Bright Warm Day (Balggo ttatteutan nal, 1987)
- A Study of Violence (Pongnyeok yeongu, 1987)
