= Park Min-gyu =

South Korean writer (born 1968)

Park Mingyu
- Born: 1968 (age 57–58)
- Occupation: Novelist
- Writing career
- Language: Korean

Korean name
- Hangul: 박민규
- RR: Bak Mingyu
- MR: Pak Min'gyu

Park Min-gyu (Korean: 박민규; born 1968) is a South Korean writer.

== Biography ==
Park Min-gyu was born in Ulsan, a small town in southeast province in South Korea in 1968. He graduated from Chungang University. His first two novels, Legend of the World's Superheroes (Chigu yongung chonsol) and The Sammi Superstars' Last Fan Club (Sammi syuposuta oe majimak paenkullob), were both published in 2003 and earned him the Munhak Dongne Author Award and the Hankyoreh Literary Prize, respectively. His short story Raccoon World (Komawo, kwayon neoguri-ya) was included in the 2005 Yi Sang Literary Award Collection.

His short stories are often characterized by a sense of humor pervasive but not overwhelming throughout the text. Characters are described to struggle with financial difficulties without a promising future.

Park is known as a successful writer but is also famous for his unique style: he appears with a ponytail and goggle-like sunglasses.

Park's novels, including Pavane for a Dead Princess, were published in 2009. One of the stories titled 〈아침의 문〉 The Door of Morning won Yi Sang Literary Award.

In 2010, Park's short story, A Nap was adapted into a theatrical play of the same name. It was directed by filmmaker Hur Jin-ho and starred Kibum of Super Junior as a young version of male lead Young-jin with Lee Joo-seung. It played at Baekam Art Hall in Samseong-dong, Seoul from January 26 to March 28.

== Works ==
=== Works in translation ===
- Castella
- Dinner with Buffet (ASIA Publishers, 2014)
- Pavane for a Dead Princess (Dalkey Press, 2014)
- Raccoon World trans. by Jenny Wang Medina
- Is That So? I'm a Giraffe trans. by Sora Kim-Russell
- Korean Standards trans. by Brother Anthony of Taize
- Say Ah, Pelican

=== Works in Korean (partial) ===
Novels

- Legend of the World's Superheroes (2003)
- The Sammi Superstars' Last Fan Club (2003)
- Ping Pong (2006)
- Pavane for a Dead Princess (2009)
- The Door of Morning (2010)

Short Stories

- Castella (Collection, 2005)
- Double (Collection in two volumes, 2010)
- A Nap

== Awards ==
- Yi Hyosŏk Literary Award (2007)
- Yi Sang Literary Award (2010 for The Door of Morning)
