= Kim Jeong-hwan (poet) =

South Korean poet, novelist, and critic (born 1954)

- Born: January 22, 1954 (age 72); Seoul
- Resting place: South Korea
- Education: Seoul National University
- Occupation: Poet
- Writing career
- Language: Korean

Korean name
- Hangul: 김정환
- Hanja: 金正煥
- RR: Gim Jeonghwan
- MR: Kim Chŏnghwan

Kim Jeong-hwan (Korean: 김정환; born 22 January 1954) is a South Korean poet, novelist, and critic.

== Life ==
Kim Jeong-hwan was born, in Seoul. He graduated with a degree in English from Seoul National University in 1980. He has participated in the Writers' Association for the Realization of Freedom and is a chairperson of the Working Men's Association of Culture and Art Movement. He made his official literary debut in the summer of 1980, with the publication of six works including "Mapo, At A Riverside Town" in Creation and Criticism.

== Work ==
Kim's first poetry collection, A Song That Cannot be Erased, depicts the internal turmoil and strife of an intellectual who suffers under the dire political conditions and absence of free thinking in the Korea of the early 1980s. The poetry of this era did not often offer a direct or mainstream depiction of contemporary social realities, but was rather an expression of sympathy and admiration for the minjung and their sorrow and resentment. His serialized poetry collection, The Story of Yellow Jesus, surpasses the narrow scope of his early poems, and offers a personal and positive perspective on saving minjung. In this collection, the poet allows the reader to hear the messages for minjung's independence and struggle through the words of Jesus and from the perspective of Heaven. Kim's voice in Our Working Men is more declarative than in his earlier poems, an indication of the increasingly political nature of his works. Laborers are also central figures who reject hypocrisy and falsity to quest instead for freedom in a land where they suffer from exploitation and oppression.

The poet's examination of a society actualized chiefly by the working class, is his most lucid, clearly constructed work, and clearly exhibits the poetic transformation undergone in the late 1980s. In the late 1990s, Kim published another collection of poetry entitled About Trains. The poems in this collection, through simple, concise diction free of the occasional monotony of prose, effectively reveal the worldview and character of the working class.

Kim has also published several realist poems that deal with the sufferings, frustrations and hopes of minjung. A series of Kim's poetry collections similarly reflect the development of the Minjung Movement and the consciousness of the intellectual. This examination of progress is considered to be the force that creates. tension in the works and captures the imagination and attention of readers.

== Works in Korean (partial) ==
Poetry collections

- Mapo, At A Riverside Town & 5 other poems (마포, 강변동네에서 외 5편, 1980, Creation and Criticism 15(2), OCLC 5159589655)
- A Song That Cannot Be Erased (지울수없는 노래, Creation and Criticism [創作과批評], 1982, OCLC 10532743)
- The Biography of Yellow Jesus (황색 예수전, Silcheon Literature [실천문학사], 1983, OCLC 15404412)
- Love Song (사랑노래, Cheongnyeonsa [청년사], 1984, OCLC 16093441)
- A Good Flower (좋은 꽃, Mineumsa [民音社], 1985, OCLC 55754084)
- We the Laborers (우리 노동자, 1989)
- About Trains (기차에대하여, Creation and Criticism, 1990, OCLC 23094051)
- Empty Theater (1995)
- Hanoi-Seoul Poems (하노이서울시편, Munhak Dongne [문학동네], 2003, OCLC 56677091)

Novels

- Into the World
- Since Then
- The Life of Love (사랑의생애, Saegil [새길], 1992, OCLC 31938269)
- Memories of Pure Gold (순금의기억, Creation and Criticism, 1996, OCLC 41369525)

Literary criticism

- Poetry of Life, Literature of Liberation (삶의詩, 해방의문학, 1986, OCLC 18168011)
