= Yoo Jae-yong =

South Korean novelist (born 1936)

- Born: June 6, 1936
- Died: December 29, 2009 (aged 73)
- Citizenship: South Korean
- Writing career
- Language: Korean

- Korean name
- Hangul: 유재용
- Hanja: 柳在用
- RR: Yu Jaeyong
- MR: Yu Chaeyong

Yoo Jae-yong (Korean: 유재용) (June 6, 1936 - December 29, 2009) was a South Korean novelist, known for his faithfulness to traditional forms and emphasis on steadfast characters.

== Life ==
Yoo Jae-yong was born on July 6, 1936, in Cheorwon, Gangwon-do during the period of Japanese rule. He attended Hwanil High School but dropped out before his graduation. In 1965 he won a prize for a children's story, The Gangly Balloon, in the New Year’s Literary Competition sponsored by Chosun Ilbo.

He died on December 29, 2009, due to an undisclosed chronic illness. He was 73.

== Work ==
Yoo made his literary debut with the serial children's tale The Gangly Balloon (키다리 풍선), which was printed in the Chosun Ilbo in 1965. Thereafter he published novels including Sanctuary (성역, 1980), Gone into the Wind and Rain (비바람 속으로 떠나가다, 1982).

Yoo's characters were typically past-oriented and fail to adapt themselves or to appreciate the complexities of the world. This is regarded by critics as a product of his intention to focus on the inner nature of the characters, rather than their interaction with external factors. In his fiction, Yoo frequently turns to lives of refugees from North Korea. A steady stream of works beginning with “Portrait of My Elder Sister” (누님의 초상, 1978) deal with Korea’s division from the viewpoint of characters who idealize the past in order to compensate for the depraved reality of the post-war present. Moreover, they display traditional outlook on life, characterized by belief in fate and inability to adapt to changing ethos and structures of society. In more recent works, however, Yoo Jaeyong sought to explore the thread that connects the past to the present rather than contenting himself with retrospection. Notable works in this vein are “Shadows” (Geurimja, 1982), “My Father’s River” (아버지의 강, 1986) and “Circle” (Hwan), all of which address the continuing legacy of Korean division manifested on the family. Yoo Jaeyong also wrote a number of stories with a distinct philosophical bent; such stories as “Relationship” (관계, 1980), “Another Man’s Life” (Tainui saengae) and “The Wig” (가발) highlight the inherent absurdity of life by featuring characters who depart from ordinary routine and assume the role of another person.

== Works in Korean (partial) ==
Short Stories

- “Shadows” (Geurimja, 1982)
- “My Father’s River” (Abeojiui gang)
- “Circle” (Hwan)
- “Relationship” (Gwangye)
- “Another Man’s Life” (Tainui saengae)
- “The Wig” (Gabal)

Collections

- Sanctuary (Seongyeok, 1980)
- Gone with the Rainstorm (Bibaram sogeuro tteonagada)
- The Shade of the Evening Sun (Sayangui geuneul)
- Land of Silence (Chimmugui ttang)

== Awards ==
- Hyundai Munhak Literary Prize, 1980
- Yi Sang Literary Award, 1980
- Literature Prize of the Republic of Korea, 1982
- Cho Yun-hyun Literary Award, 1985
- Dong-in Literary Award, 1987

== See also ==
- List of Korean novelists
- Korean literature
- Korean poetry
