= Kim Joo-young =

South Korean writer

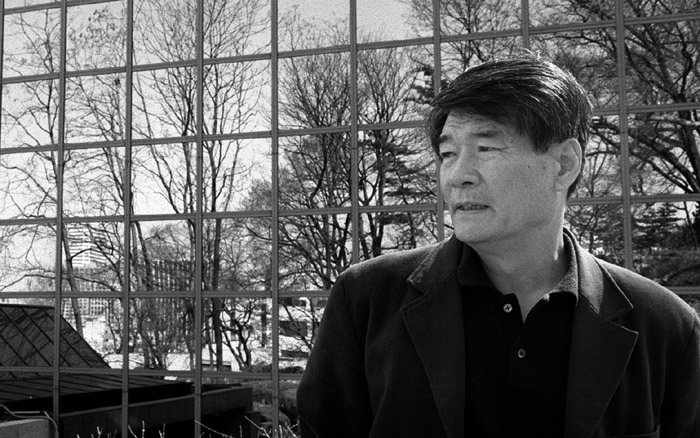
- Born: December 7, 1939 (age 86); Cheongsong, Gyeongsangbuk-do, Korea
- Resting place: Andong, South Korea
- Occupation: Writer
- Writing career
- Language: Korean
- Period: 1970-Present
- Genre: Fiction

Korean name
- Hangul: 김주영
- Hanja: 金周榮
- RR: Gim Juyeong
- MR: Kim Chuyŏng

Kim Joo-young (born December 7, 1939) is a South Korean writer of historical fiction.

== Life ==
Kim was born on December 7, 1939, in Cheongsong, Gyeongsangbuk-do at the height of the Japanese occupation, and as a child experienced Korean liberation and the Korean War. He graduated from Daegu Agricultural High School and from the creative writing program at Seorabol College of Art (now merged with Chung-Ang University), which he attended against the wishes of his father. He originally intended to become a writer, but is best known for his historical fiction.

== Work ==
He began making his mark as a writer with Summer Hunting (Yeoreum sanyang), chosen for the second-place prize by the journal Literature Monthly (Wolgan munhak) in 1970, and A Period of Dormancy (Hyumyeongi), awarded the prize for new writers by the same journal in 1971. Throughout the 1970s, Kim Joo-young wrote works driven by strong satirical impulse directed against results of modernization in Korea. In many of these vignettes, the snobbery of urban people are contrasted with wholesome humanity of country-folk; when transplanted into the brutal atmosphere of the cities, these simple people are forced to become devious in order simply to survive. Works from this period include Evil Spirit (Angnyeong), Apprenticeship in Thievery (Doduk gyeonseup), and Model Breeding (Mobeom sayuk).

It is, however, as the writer of The Innkeeper, a monumental saga in ten volumes that details the lives of itinerant merchants at the close of the nineteenth century, that Kim Joo-young is best known. Serialized from June 1979 to February 1983 in Seoul Shinmun, The Innkeeper marked a departure from preceding Korean historical novels in its view of history from the vantage point of the masses. Written after a period of intensive research, the text teems with life and offers a storehouse of folk customs, languages, and ways of thought. In a vibrant, engaging manner, The Innkeeper provides a panoramic overview of late 19th century Joseon society, especially the rise of industrial capital.

With the success of The Innkeeper, Kim Joo-young continued writing historical fiction, producing multi-volume novels The Wanderers (화적 禾尺 Hwacheok, 1991) and Righteous Band of Brigands (활빈도 活貧徒 Hwalbindo, 1987). He also turned retrospectively to the space of his childhood — a small country village of Gyeongsangbuk-do where he grew up poor and fatherless — in such works as The Roar of Thunder (Cheondung sori, 1986) and Fishermen Don't Break Reeds (Gogijabineun galdaereul kkeokji anneunda, 1988).

=== Works in translation ===
- Stingray (홍어)
- The Sound of Thunder
- Sardellen (German)
- Ein Fischer bricht das Schilfrohr nicht (German)
- Раскаты грома (Russian)
- El pescador no tala (Spanish)
- La Raya (Spanish)
- صوت الرعد (Arabic)
- 惊天雷声 (Chinese)
- 鳀鱼 (Chinese)
- 洪魚 (Chinese)
- Le pêcheur ne cueille pas de roseaux (French)
- Le Bruit du Tonnerre (천둥소리) (French)

=== Awards ===
Kim Juyeong received the 1982 Novelists’ Award for Travelogue to the Oechon Market (외촌장外村場 기행 Oechonjang gihaeng, 1984) and the 1984 Yoo Juhyeon Literary Award for The Innkeeper.
