= Kim Moon-soo (novelist) =

Korean novelist

Kim Moon-soo (Korean: 김문수; 1939–2012) was a Korean novelist. In his early works, he delves into an ordinary life of an individual being destroyed by the tragedy of the Korean War and the introduction of industrialism. In his later works, he deals with the conflicts between materialism and traditional ethics during the expansion of industrialization.

== Biography ==
Kim Moon-soo was born in Cheongju, Chungcheongbuk-do, South Korea in 1939. He attended Dongguk University for his undergraduate and Kookmin University for his graduate degree. When Kim was a freshman, he won Jayu Shinmun New Writer's Contest for his first short novel Oeroun Saram (외로운 사람 Lonely People) in 1959, and later won Chosun Ilbo New Writer's Contest for Idanbuheung (이단부흥 A Revival of Heresy). Since 1967, he has worked as a writer and a worker in the editorial department at a publishing house. Moreover, he served as a professor at Hanyang Women's University and later at Dongguk University, and worked in an active member at the Korean Writers’ Association and the Korea P.E.N. As a vigorous writer for 40 years, he published 10 novels, 90 novellas and short novels until he died due to his chronic disease in 2012.

== Writing ==
The protagonists in his early works are mostly pensive and defensive, rather than active in problem solving. Kim Moon-soo adopts to weave each event together with psychological association, and in the conclusion of the story, he utilizes irony to give a twist. His characters are mainly ordinary people, so he used to be dubbed as “a writer for ordinary people.”

=== Early works ===
His early works deal with ordinary lives of ordinary people who are eventually ruined by the tragedy of the Korean War and the wave of industrial revolution. The protagonists keep suffering inside after being traumatized when they are just kids. Over time, they migrate to big cities like Seoul to get a job, but they end up as bottom dwellers. One of the major works during Kim's early days is Jeungmyo (증묘, Sacrificing Cats 1971), a novella, which shed a light on the corruption of human virtue in the aftermath of the Korean War. The term “Jeungmyo” represents a superstitious action of human beings to avoid bad luck by sacrificing cats, and the story incorporates ethical conflicts of society at the time into the issue of female sexuality.

=== Later works ===
Kim's later works majorly illustrate the clash between materialism and traditional morals as modernization steadily expands in Korean society. The protagonists in his later novels go through constant failures and defeats due to materialism and egotism—the dominant values in the industrial era—but still try to preserve their virtues in traditional ethics. A winner of the Dongin Literary Award, Manchwidanggi (만취당기, The Chronicle of Manchwidang, 1989), is one of the notable works during Kim's late career.

This novel examines the conflict between morality and the corrupted world where traditional familism coexists with the desire to be successful in modern society. After successfully getting a job as a civil servant, the protagonist enjoys success in life. However, he is threatened to be fired because of his disobedience to inappropriate orders from above, eventually leading him to move back to his family house, Manchwidang. His father is a conservative person who is obsessed with a familial prophecy that three ministers of states will come out from his family. To make his son the third one, the father forces his son to succumb to his superiors in work, by giving them a bribe. The protagonist's struggle to protect his belief against his father's obsessive quest resonates in the readers’ heart. In addition to The Chronicle of Manchwidang, his other remarkable novels are: Pamuneul Kiun Moraeal (파문을 키운 모래알, A Grain of Sand That Makes a Ripple, 1997), which navigates different aspects of human beings who live to fool each other in this contemporary world, with a backdrop of the collapse of Seongsu Bridge, and Gaji Aneun Gil (가지 않은 길, The Road not Taken, 1999) is a novel that illustrates the life of an agonized intellectual who refuses to compromise and tries to sustain life as a moral being.

== Works ==
=== Short story collections ===
《증묘(蒸猫)》, 삼성출판사, 1972 / Jeungmyo (Sacrificing Cats), Samsung, 1972

《성흔》, 한국문학사, 1975 / Seongheun (Stigmata), Hangungmunhaksa, 1975

《바람아, 이 영혼을》, 1979 / Barama, I Yeonghoneul (Wind and My Soul), Hanmaeumsa, 1979

《돌을 닮은 아이》, 금성출판사, 1984 / Doreul Dalmeun Ai (A Kid Who Resembles a Stone), Kumsung, 1984

《물레나물꽃》, 문예출판사, 1987 / Mullenamulkkot (Hypericum), Moonye, 1987

《머리 둘 달린 새》, 민족문화문고간행회, 1987 / Meori Dul Dallin Sae (A Bird with Two Heads), Korean Culture Publishing Association, 1987

《서울이 좋다지만》, 문학아카데미사, 1991 / Seouri Jotajiman (Seoul Is Not That Nice), Munhagakademisa, 1991

《그 세월의 뒤》, 무수막, 1993 / Geu Seworui Dwi (After All These Years), Musumak, 1993

《가출》, 답게, 1997 / Gachul (Run Away), Dapge, 1997

《꺼오뿌리》, 주류성, 2002 / Kkeooppuri (Dog Meat), Juryuseong, 2002

《만취당기》, 돋을새김, 2004 / Manchwidanggi (The Chronicle of Manchwidang), Dodeulsaegim, 2004

=== Novels ===
《환상의 성》, 대광출판사, 1978 / Hwansangui Seong (A Fantasy Castle), Daegwang, 1978

《바람과 날개》, 갑인출판사, 1980 / Baramgwa Nalgae (Wind and Wings), Gabin, 1980

《그 여름의 나팔꽃》, 갑인출판사, 1980 / Geu Yeoreumui Napalkkot (A Morning Glory in the Summer), Gabin, 1980

《서러운 꽃》, 현대문학, 1988 / Seoreoun Kkot (A Sorrowful Flower), Hyundaemunhak, 1988

《어둠 저쪽의 빛》, 세계일보, 1990 / Eodum Jeojjogui Bit (A Light Beyond the Dark), Segye Ilbo, 1990

《가지 않은 길》, 좋은 날, 1999 / Gaji Aneun Gil (The Road Not Taken), Joeunnal, 1999

《세상 끝에서》, 등물, 2001 / Sesang Kkeuteseo (On the Edge of the World), Deungmul, 2001

=== Children’s book ===
《민아네 집》, 웅진출판, 1995 / Minane Jip (Mina's House), Woongjinbooks, 1995

=== Essay collections ===
《가슴에 키우는 별》, 답게, 1991 / Gaseume Kiuneun Byeol (A Star in the Heart), Dapge, 1991

《쇠에서 난 녹이 그 쇠를 먹으니》, 답게, 2000 / Soeeseo Nan Nogi Geu Soereul Meogeuni (The Rust Out of Iron Eats the Iron), Dapge, 2000

=== Works in translation ===
《만취당기》, 돋을새김, 2004 / The Chronicle of Manchwidang, Jimoondang, 2003

《가지 않은 길》, 좋은 날, 1999 / 未选择的路, 上海译文出版社, 2009

=== Awards ===
Jayu Shinmun New Writer's Contest (1959) for “Lonely People”

Chosun Ilbo New Writer's Contest (1961) for “A Revival of Heresy”

21st Contemporary Literature (Hyundai Munhak) Award (1976) for Stigmata

4th Hankook Ilbo New Writer's Contest (1978) for Granulation

11th Korea Writer's Award (한국문학작가상, 1986)

6th Yeon-Hyeon Cho Literary Award (조연현문학상, 1987) for Hypericum

20th Dongin Literary Award (1989) for “The Chronicle of Manchwidang”

5th O Yeong-su Literary Award (오영수문학상, 1997) for “A Grain of Sand That Makes a Ripple”
