= Kim Ji-won (novelist) =

South Korean writer (1943–2013)

Kim Jiwon
- 김지원
- Born: November 10, 1943; Keiki-dō, Korea, Empire of Japan
- Died: January 30, 2013 (aged 69); New York City, United States
- Writing career
- Language: Korean

Korean name
- Hangul: 김지원
- Hanja: 金知原
- RR: Gim Jiwon
- MR: Kim Chiwŏn

Kim Jiwon (Korean: 김지원; November 10, 1943 – January 30, 2013) was a South Korean writer.

== Life ==
Kim Jiwon was raised in a literary family. She was born in 1943 in Keiki-dō (Gyeonggi Province), Korea, Empire of Japan to Choe Jeong-hui, one of the most popular female Korean writers in the twentieth century, and Kim Dong-hwan, a famous poet. Kim's sister, Kim Chae-won, is also a writer. Kim Jiwon graduated from Ehwa University in 1965, emigrated to New York City, USA in 1973, and published her first story in 1974. She lived in New York from the 1970s until her death.

== Work ==
Kim wrote primarily about women in failed relationships with husbands (A Certain Beginning in 1974 and Lullaby in 1979). In A Certain Beginning a woman is hopelessly trapped between social expectations of money and relationships. Set in the United States, the story features the protagonist, Yun-ja, agreeing to marry Chong-il so that he can get a green card. Middled-aged and having been left by her first husband, Yun-ja hopes that the wedding will actually work out, both because it would be a welcome change and because she yearns for a better apartment. While both Yun-ja and Chong-il seem open to this possibility at first, Chong-il comes to see his arrangement as the purchase of an aging prostitute. Women are portrayed as having only their bodies as assets and, although Yun-ja makes a brave statement of independence at the end of the book, it seems an empty statement given her feelings of vulnerability related to her previous marriage, age, and physical condition.

Kim's story Almaden is similar: a Korean woman living in New York is unhappy with her marriage and life. At the liquor store where she and her husband work, a regular client becomes the focus of her dreams of relationship. She becomes increasingly unhappy with her real life but, when her fantasy lover disappears, she is left back in her initial position, hoping that someone else will come to rescue her from her plight.

=== Works in English ===
- "A Certain Beginning" and "Lullaby" (in Words of Farewell Stories by Korean Women Writers)"
- "Almaden" (in The Future of Silence Fiction By Korean Women)

=== Works in Korean (partial) ===
- "Almaden" (알마덴), 1988
