= Kim Jeong-hwan (footballer) =

South Korean footballer (born 1997)

Personal information
- Date of birth: 4 January 1997 (age 29)
- Place of birth: Seoul, South Korea
- Height: 1.75 m (5 ft 9 in)
- Position: Forward

Team information
- Current team: Suwon FC
- Number: 11

Youth career
- 2013–2015: Shingal High School

Senior career*
| Years | Team | Apps | (Gls) |
| 2016–2017 | FC Seoul | 1 | (0) |
| 2018–2020 | Gwangju FC | 56 | (10) |
| 2021–2023 | Seoul E-Land FC | 68 | (9) |
| 2023 | Busan IPark | 13 | (2) |
| 2024–2025 | Seongnam FC | 41 | (3) |
| 2026– | Suwon FC | 18 | (2) |

International career
| 2015–2016 | South Korea U20 | 12 | (3) |
- * Club domestic league appearances and goals as of 5 August 2026

- Kim Jeong-hwan
- Hangul: 김정환
- Hanja: 金正桓
- RR: Gim Jeonghwan
- MR: Kim Chŏnghwan

Kim Jeong-hwan (Korean: 김정환; born 4 January 1997) is a South Korean professional footballer who plays as a forward for K League 2 club Suwon FC.

== Club career ==
Kim joined FC Seoul in 2016 and made his debut again Buriram United on 20 April 2016 and league debut against Jeonbuk Hyundai Motors on 28 August 2016.

== International career ==
He has been a member of the South Korea national U-20 team since 2015.

== Club career statistics ==
| Club performance | | | League | | Cup | | continental | | Total | |
| Season | Club | League | Apps | Goals | Apps | Goals | Apps | Goals | Apps | Goals |
| South Korea | | | League | | KFA Cup | | Asia | | Total | |
|---|---|---|---|---|---|---|---|---|---|---|
| 2016 | FC Seoul | K League Classic | 1 | 0 | 0 | 0 | 2 | 0 | 3 | 0 |
| Total | South Korea | | 1 | 0 | 0 | 0 | 2 | 0 | 3 | 0 |
| Career total | | | 1 | 0 | 0 | 0 | 2 | 0 | 3 | 0 |
