= Kim Jae-young (author) =

South Korean writer and professor (born 1966)

- Born: 1966 (age 59–60)
- Writing career
- Language: Korean

- Korean name
- Hangul: 김재영
- Hanja: 金在瑩
- RR: Gim Jaeyeong
- MR: Kim Chaeyŏng

Kim Jae-young (Korean: 김재영; born November 1966) is a South Korean writer and professor. She articulates pressing societal issues such as diaspora and neoliberalism from the perspectives of the marginalized and minorities. Kokkiri (코끼리 Elephant), which represents migrant workers' issues through the use of mythic and archetypal symbols, is her most representative work.

== Life ==
Born in 1966 in Yeoju, Gyeonggi Province, South Korea Kim moved to Seoul during her elementary school years and went to Ssangmun Elementary, Dobong Girls Middle School and Songgok Girls High School. She enjoyed writing children's poems during elementary school so much that she independently created her own collection of children's poetry. In her third year of middle school, she read Yi Sang’s 1936 short story “Nalgae” (날개 Wings) during Korean language class and became interested in novels. It was because of this interest that she also later joined and became active in her high school's literary club. While still in high school, Kim began writing literature and in 1985 she enrolled in SungKyunKwan University where she majored in Family Management. She was primarily interested in dramatic arts, but in her junior year was deeply affected by the Workers Struggle of June 1987. She was elected president of the College of Life Sciences, but was eventually expelled from school. Kim worked for a time as an assistant for National Federation of Street Vendors and eventually married and had two sons. As she entered her thirties, she thoughtlessly began writing novels without any sort of special preparation. This was largely due to her dissatisfaction with the huildam munhak (“literature of reminiscence” or “epilogue novels”) trend that was popular in the 1990s. The author, after having directly participated in the 1980s democratization movements, stated that she felt dejected and dissatisfied in seeing the denigration of this fervor for change within huildam literature. However, huildam literature was a short-lived trend and Kim made her debut in 2000 with the short story “Tto dareun gyejeol” (또 다른 계절 Yet Another Season) which dealt with her personal experience of her father's death at a young age. She returned to university at Chungang University where she completed the professionals course, and went on to the Chungang Graduate School. Kim spent a year in New York when her husband had a visiting professorship at Columbia University. While there she wrote diasporic stories. She received her doctorate degree in 2013 and as of 2015 was teaching literature ad Chungang University, Myongil University, and Soongeui Women's College.

She generally centers her novels around pressing societal issues and controversies. For instance, her 2005 novel Kokkiri deals with the human rights issues of migrant laborers and marriage migrants, while her 2009 novel Pokshik (폭식 Gluttony) deals with the life of a foreigner that visits the strange land of America for one year. In her 2018 novel Sagwapai nanuneun sigan (사과파이 나누는 시간 Apple Pie-Sharing Time), she explores contemporary domestic Korean issues such as youth unemployment, temporary contract employees, and state violence.

Kim Jae-young actively gives college lectures or lectures open to the public and has used her platform as an author to criticize societal problems. In 2018, she became a representative for the Bara Arts and Cultural Education Research Center and is currently a member of the board of directors for the Jeju Migrant Peace Community.

== Writing ==
Unusually, Kim's works often focus on the immigrant experience in Korea. Kim wrote her first professional story in 1998 and it won the Jeon Tae-il Literary Award. In 1999 she won another major award for her work "Another Season" and became a critical hit when "The Elephant" was published in Quarterly Changbi in 2004. Her novel, Gluttony, was published in 2009.

=== Diaspora ===
Kim Jae-young's early writings concentrate on the problems within and faced by the diaspora. She not only represents the diaspora population within Korea itself, such as the hardships faced by multicultural families and the realities of foreign workers, but has also expanded her writings to include the problems faced by diaspora outside of Korea largely caused by globalization. The titular short story “Kokkiri” within her 2005 collection of short stories, Kokkiri, is one of the most famous works among Korean literature portraying foreign workers written in the 2000s. The story focuses on “I” (Akaseu) who was born in South Korea but unable to register his birth because his father is Nepalese and his mother is an ethnic Korean living in China, as well as other migrant workers who, unable to find belonging in Korea or their hometowns, wander through their lives as strangers. “I” (Akaseu) symbolizes his father as an elephant—the animal that props up the universe in Hinduist mythology—but this also functions as a larger metaphor in which migrant workers, like the elephant in the myth, sustain and support Korean society. That is, she emphasizes that foreigners exist within Korean society and thus, their problems are also Korean problems. The use of mythic symbolism as a metaphor in representing important values that must be safeguarded within reality is one of Kim's distinctive writing methods that shape her novels.

Her 2009 novel, Pokshik (Gluttony), depicts foreigners in every region of the world that have been marginalized from society. Her personal experience living as a foreigner in the United States made her realize that it is not only Korea, but all international major cities that face issues related to multiculturalism. In stories such as “Aengcho” (앵초 Primrose), where the protagonist cannot even collect her dead husband's body after the September 11 Attacks on the World Trade Center, and the titular “Pokshik,” where even though Team Leader Min is diagnosed with a rare disease from overwork, he cannot give up his job at a large multinational corporation, Kim juxtaposes the richness and abundance of cities with the wretched lives within them. The moment that foreigners are excluded from power and its cold logic, they face a world of heartless violence. After the publication of Pokshik, Kim no longer represented diasporic narratives in her works because she stated that she wanted the next generation of writers, who grew up in multicultural families themselves, to portray them in their own voices.

=== Capitalist logic and survival ===
Her 2018 novel, Sagwapai nanuneun sigan, represents the lives of those whose survival is threatened by the logic of capitalism and developmentalism. Perhaps because the author stated that her motivation behind writing this book was to provide comfort to all those that have been wounded, this book uses far more mythic and archetypal symbols to create a stronger sense of romantic imagination than her previous works. Kim wrote the novel while she was constantly going back and forth between Jeju Island and the mainland when she was building her future home on Jeju Island. Because of this, the history and mythology of Jeju Island, as well as a concern towards nature, features prominently in the novel—such as the short story “Geu seome deulda” (그 섬에 들다 To Enter That Island). In particular, the cosmic imagination in the titular story “Sagwapai nanuneun sigan” romantically renders an optimistic energy in order to overcome the difficulties of reality with its self-reflection and introspection towards life.

== Works in translation ==
- 《코끼리》, 실천문학사, 2005 / Elephant, Literature Translation Institute of Korea e-books, 2008.
- 《코끼리》, 실천문학사, 2005 / The Elephant (Bi-lingual Edition Modern Korean Literature, Volume 49), Asia Publishers, 2014.

== Works in Korean ==
- 《코끼리》, 실천문학사, 2005 / Kokkiri (Elephant), Silcheon, 2005.
- 《폭식》, 창비, 2009. / Pokshik (Gluttony), Changbi, 2009.
- 《사과파이 나누는 시간》, 자음과 모음, 2018. / Sagwapai nanuneun sigan (Apple Pie-Sharing Time), Jaeumgwa moeum, 2018.

== Awards ==
- Jeon Tae-il Award (1998).
- Writer of Tomorrow New Writer Award (1999).
- Writers Opening Tomorrow New Writer's Award (《내일을 여는 작가》 신인상, 2000)
