= Kim Jeong-hwan (volleyball) =

South Korean volleyball player (born 1988)

Kim Jeong-Hwan
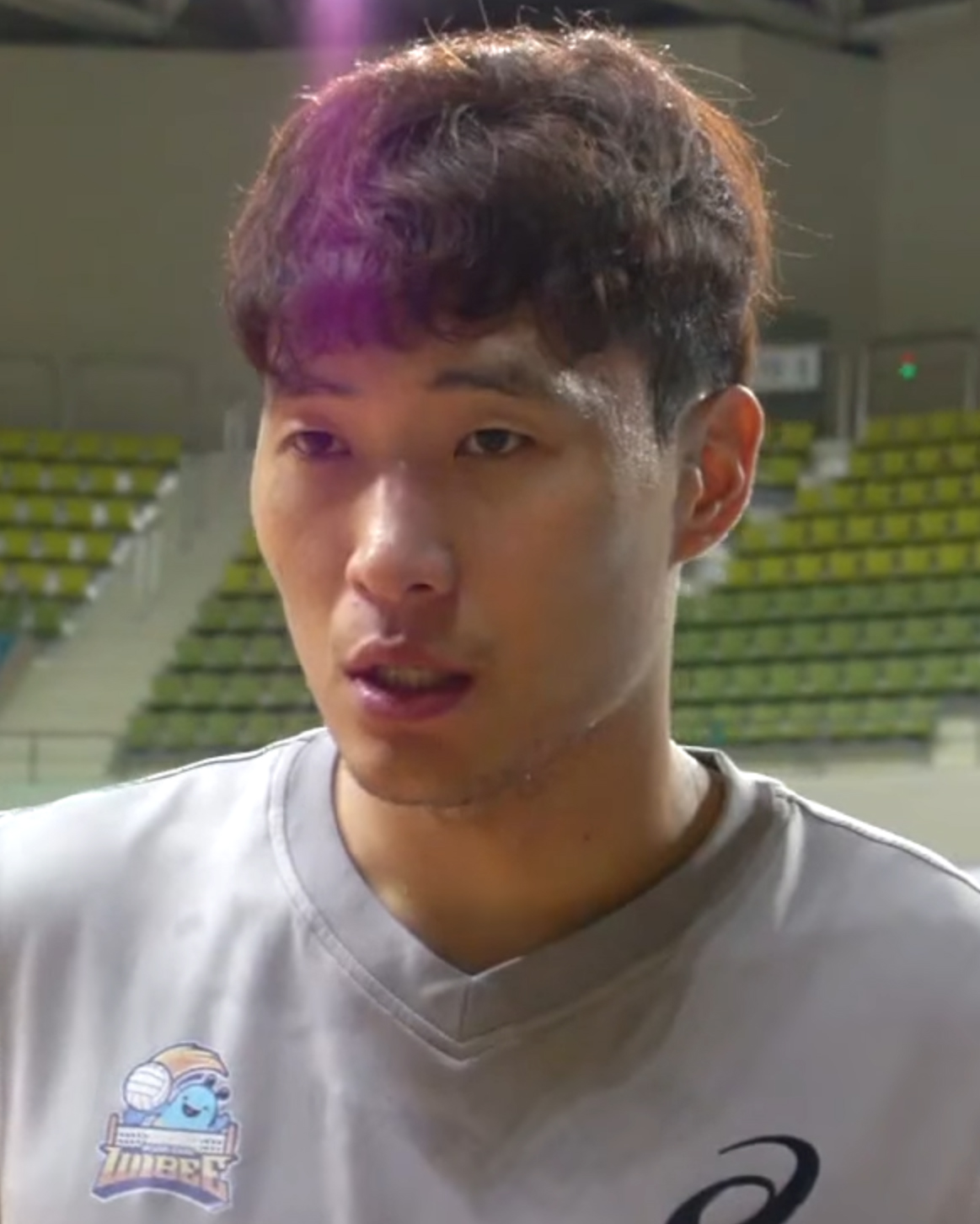
- Kim in 2018

Personal information
- Nationality: South Korean
- Born: 23 March 1988 (age 38)
- Height: 196 cm (6 ft 5 in)
- Weight: 94 kg (207 lb)
- Spike: 329 cm (130 in)
- Block: 320 cm (126 in)
- Education: Inha University

Volleyball information
- Position: outside hitter opposite hitter
- Current club: Uijeongbu KB Insurance Stars
- Number: 21 (national team)

Career
Years	Teams
2010-2019; 2019-	Seoul Woori Card Wibee; Uijeongbu KB Insurance Stars

National team
2011	South Korea
Honours
Men's volleyball
Representing South Korea
Asian Championship
Silver medal – second place	2013 Dubai

Kim Jeong-Hwan (born 23 March 1988) is a South Korean male volleyball player. He is part of the South Korea men's national volleyball team.
