= Choi Il-nam =

South Korean writer (1932–2023)

- Born: 29 December 1932; Jeonju, Zenrahoku-dō, Korea, Empire of Japan
- Died: 28 May 2023 (aged 90); Seoul, South Korea
- Citizenship: South Korean
- Writing career
- Language: Korean

- Choi Il-nam
- Hangul: 최일남
- RR: Choe Ilnam
- MR: Ch'oe Illam

Choi Il-Nam (Korean: 최일남; 29 December 1932 – 28 May 2023) was a South Korean writer.

== Life and career ==
Born in Jeonju, Zenrahoku-dō on 29 December 1932, Choi Il-Nam graduated from Seoul National University in 1957 with a degree in Korean language and literature. He received his Ph.D. in Korean literature from Korea University in 1960 and embarked on a career that combined journalism and fiction writing. He served as the head of the culture department at Minguk Daily, Kyunghyang Daily News, and The Dong-A Ilbo; and subsequently became the editor-in-chief of The Dong-A Ilbo, a position he held until he was dismissed in 1980.

Choi died on 28 May 2023, at the age of 90.

== Work ==
After publishing fewer than two dozen stories in the 1950s and 1960s, Choi became more prolific in the 1970s, which featured his first book of fiction, People of Seoul (Seoulites).

Choi's novels fall into two broad categories. His works prior to 1980 often portray a person from the countryside coming to the rapidly urbanizing and industrializing city, where they succeed in building a new life. Despite the characters' success, however, the industrializing city is always shown to be founded on the relative poverty of the countryside, pointing to the sacrifice of the latter in achieving the success of the former. In his early novels, Choi wished to show the dark side of industrial development. Following his forced dismissal from journalism in 1980, Choi's stories shifted to a more intense criticism of social reality. But rather than landing sharp attacks on society, his later works are constructed so as to point to everyday human egotism existing in pockets across the social landscape, or to describe powerless individuals alienated by power.

== Works in translation ==
- "The Lone Wolf", in Anthology of Korean Literature Vol. 1 (1988)
- "Ballad" in Modern Korean Fiction: An Anthology (2005)

== Works in Korean (partial) ==
=== Short story collections ===
- Seoul salamdeul (Seoulites, 1975)
  - Nosae du mari (Two Mules)
- Geu ddae mal i isseossne (There Was Talk Then, 1989)
- Hiteulleona jindallae (Hitler and Azaleas, 1991)
- Seongnyu (Pomegranate, 2004)

=== Novels ===
- Ssuk iyagi (The Tale of Mugwort, 1953)
- Geuligo heundeullineun bae (And Then the Rocking Ship, 1984)
- Heureuneun buk (The Flowing Drum, 1986)
- Hayan son (The White Hand, 1994)
- Mannyeonpil gwa papiluseu (Pen and Papyrus, 1997)

== Awards ==
- Woltan Literature Prize (1975)
- Korean Creative Writing Prize (1981)
- Yi Sang Literary Award (1986)
- Catholic Press Literature Award (1988)
- Inchon Literature Prize (1994)
