= Yang Gwija =

South Korean writer (born 1955)

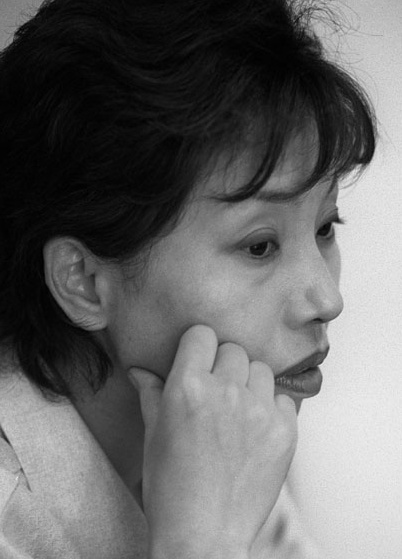
- Yang Gwija
- Born: July 1, 1955 (age 71); Jeonju, Jeollabuk-do
- Writing career
- Language: Korean

Korean name
- Hangul: 양귀자
- Hanja: 梁貴子
- RR: Yang Gwija
- MR: Yang Kwija

Yang Gwija (born 1955) (Korean: 양귀자; Hanja: 梁貴子) is a South Korean writer.

== Life ==
Yang Gwija was born July 1, 1955, in Jeonju, Jeollabuk-do and graduated from Wonkwang University in 1978 with a degree in Korean Literature. She later moved to Seoul after her marriage in 1980. Yang made her literary debut with the short stories Starting a New Morning and The Door Already Closed. In 1986 she achieved popular success with the release of her collection of linked short stories (yeonjak seosal) Neighbors in Wonmi-dong, for which she is still most famous. This collection was a painstaking depiction of the lives of people on the periphery of industrial culture. In 1988 Yang won the Fifth Yoo Juhyoen Literature award and followed up by winning the even more prestigious Lee Sang Literature Award in 1992.

As the 1990s turned into a consumer culture in Korea, and a mood of disillusionment replaced the political (and to some extent economic) hope that had characterized the nation. Yang's work followed along. In 1992 she wrote The Hidden Flower which told the story, in some ways autobiographical, of an author searching for new hope after her old ideals have been destroyed. In The Road to Cheonma Tombs, Yang's protagonist successfully struggles to come to terms with his past trauma and current powerlessness. The Hidden Flower and The Road to Cheonma Tombs are collected with three other stories, Mountain Flower, Opportunist, and Sadness Gives Strength, in a collection named for the latter story.

Since the mid-1980s she has been known as more than a fiction writer, writing in women's magazines, newspapers, and other general media. In the 1990s she also opened a popular restaurant in Seoul.

== Work ==
Yang's best-known early work was the 1987 Wonmi-dong saramdeul (Neighbors in Wonmi-dong), which depicted the isolation and alienated status of small towns as a result of modernization. This work was published in English as A Distant and Beautiful Place, which reflects the literal meaning of the Korean title. During the 1990s Yang's fiction became more and more personal featuring a run of popular works that included Contradictions ('Mosun'), which was the best-selling Korean novel of 1998.

=== Works in English ===
- A Distant and Beautiful Place
- Contradictions
- Rust
- Nuri, Nuri, What Are You Doing? (translated by Moon Seung-Won and Todd Vercoe) ISBN 89-578-1185-0

=== Works in Korean (Partial) ===
- The Deaf Bird (1980)
- Along the River of Babylon (1985)
- Neighbors in Wonmi-dong (1987)
- Hope (1991)
- I Wish for What Is Forbidden to Me (1992)
- Sorrow Can Be Power (1993)
- Love for a Thousand Years (1995)
- Contradictions (1998)

== Awards ==
- Fifth Yoo Juhyeon Literature Award (1988)
- Sixteenth Yi Sang Literature Award (1992)
- Contemporary Literature (Hyundae Munhak) Award (1996)
