= Song Sokze =

South Korean writer, poet and painter (born 1960)

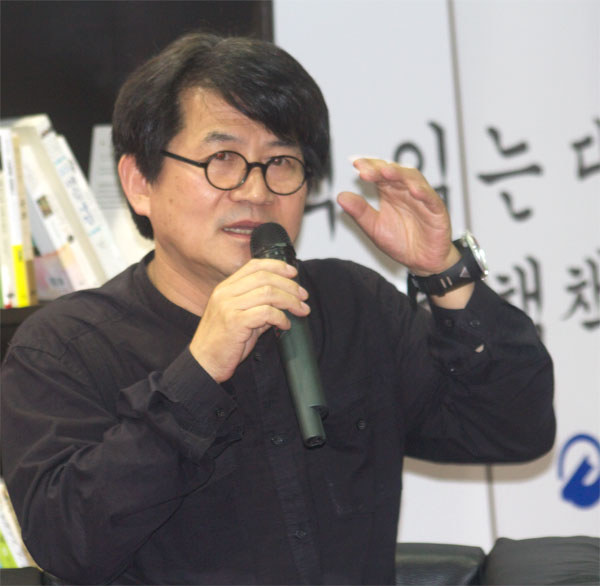
- Song at SIBF 2014
- Born: July 5, 1960 (age 66)
- Writing career
- Language: Korean

Korean name
- Hangul: 성석제
- Hanja: 成碩濟
- RR: Seong Seokje
- MR: Sŏng Sŏkche

Song Sokze (Korean: 성석제; born July 5, 1960) is a South Korean writer, poet and painter.

== Biography ==
Song was born on July 5, 1960, in Sangju, South Korea. He studied law at Yonsei University in Seoul, Song made his literary debut in 1986 when he had five poems published in the Munhak-sasang in 1986. In 1991 he published a poetry collection and then moved to writing "very short" stories that he conceived of as between poetry and short stories. Song continued to work at a day job for six years, until 1993, when he quit and devoted himself to writing and had his first short story "The Final 4.5 Seconds of My Life" published in the Summer Issue of Munhakdongne in 1995.

== Work ==
Song's works focus on ordinary character, often those at the edges of society, and he gives these characters a mixture of cleverness and naivete, then drops them into unlikely situations. His work is intentionally humorous, to the point that they have even been criticized for that humor.

The Literature Translation Institute of Korea summarizes Song's work:

Song Sokze(1960~ ) is an exceptionally gifted raconteur (sic). The familiarity we find in Seong's characters, despite the fact that they seem exaggerated or even unlikely at times, lies in their embodiment of the comic and the absurd we recognize in ourselves and in people around us.

While he certainly examines the tribulations of life, he gives weighty matters a feathery touch by infusing them with humor, fast-moving wit, and suppleness of narrative style. Seong's remarkable verbal energy is apparent in Pure Heart in which a child of uncertain parentage who fails at puppy love becomes a thief, matures in that trade, and finally comes to his ruin. Though the plot is simple, Seong adroitly balances the tension between exaggeration and lies, pithy and prolix expressions, laughter and pathos to provide constant textual pleasure.

== Works in Translation ==
English

- In the Shade of the Oleander

German

- Die letzten viereinhalb Sekunden meines Lebens (성석제-단편선)

Chinese

- 纯情神偷 (도망자 이치도)

French

- A QUI MIEUX MIEUX (위풍당당)

== Works in Korean (Partial) ==
Short Story Collections

- Turned Into A Bird (Saega doi-eotnae, 새가 되었네, 1996)
- Fun-filled Life (Jaeminaneun insaeng, 재미나는 인생, 1997)
- Possessed (Holim, 홀림, 1999)
- Thus Spoke Hwang Man Geun (Hwang man geun eun ireotgae malhaetda, 황만근은 이렇게 말했다, 2002);

Novella

- I Saw A Tiger (Horang-i reul boatda, 호랑이를 봤다, 1999)

Novels

- Innocence (Sunjeong, 2000),
- Human Strength (Ingan-ui him, 2003).

== Awards ==
- Korea Daily Literature Award (1997)
- Dong-in Literary Award (2002)
- Ohyoungsu Literary Award (2005)
- Yosan Literary Award (2014)
- Chae Man-sik Literary Award (2015)
