= Kim Yong-man (writer) =

- Born: 1940 (age 85–86)
- Writing career
- Language: Korean

Korean name
- Hangul: 김용만
- RR: Gim Yongman
- MR: Kim Yongman

Kim Yong-man is a modern South Korean poet.

== Life ==
Kim was born in 1940 in Buyeo, Chungnam Province, but claims several hometowns due to his close connection with them, including South Jeolla, Gangwon Province, and the capital, Seoul.

He moved frequently from one place to another, working in various occupations. Born to a very poor family, he barely completed high school and couldn't attend university, lacking money for tuition. Instead he became a police officer, although later in life he completed undergraduate as well as graduate studies. While working as a policeman, he participated in suppressing democracy movement protests by university students. Kim was assigned to a regional police station where he also watched over prisoners in the small lockup there.

After resigning from the police, he tried his hand at several businesses, making quite a bit of money. His catering business experience became the backdrop for the novel, Neungsoo's Mother of Chuncheon Restaurant. Unable to find happiness through mere material success, however, his fundamental aspirations for beauty and solitude led to his desire to write. He made his literary debut in 1989 with the novelette, Ornamental Silver Knife, which was published in the well-known Korean literary monthly Hyundae Munhak. The poverty of his family, diverse job history, and life travails served as excellent sources of inspiration for his work.

== Work ==
Kim Yong-man's works tend to make readers question the nature of life. The kind of life contemplated by Kim is quite distant from the feigned lives of manic happiness held up by society. Metaphorically speaking, the author considers life to be a trashcan while human beings are not suited to being packaged in metaphysical grandeur. Perhaps that is why in [Women Who Love Monsters], a seemingly-virtuous wife is raped by a burglar, gets pregnant, yet bears and raises the child. She subsequently refers to herself as a "whore." From the author's perspective, human beings can be simply described as thieves or whores. In addition, he believes that it is through sin that human beings discover their true nature. Consequently, it is vulgarity, not sin, that Kim Yong-man despises. In Kim's first short story collection, Youse Ma Woman, he draws a clear distinction between sin and vulgarity, viewing the former as unintended corruption, in contrast to the latter.

== Works in Korean ==
=== Short story collections ===
- Youse Ma Woman (1992)
- The Knife-Wielding Wife (2006)

=== Full-length novels ===
- Blade and Sunlight (1993)
- People's Era (1993)
- Women Who Love Monsters (2008)
- Neungsoo's Mother of Chuncheon Restaurant (2009)

=== Collections ===
- Mother's Virtual Space (2010)

== Awards ==
- Park Young-joon Literature Prize (2002)
- PEN International Literature Prize (Women Who Love Monsters, 2008)
- Kyunghee Literature Prize (Mother's Virtual Space, 2010)
