= Kim Yong-ik =

Korean–American writer (1920–1995)

- Born: May 15, 1920; Tongyeong, Keishōnan-dō, Chōsen
- Died: April 11, 1995
- Writing career
- Language: Korean
- Period: 1920–95

Korean name
- Hangul: 김용익
- Hanja: 金容益
- RR: Gim Yongik
- MR: Kim Yongik

Kim Yong-ik (Korean: 김용익; May 15, 1920 – April 11, 1995), also known as Yong Ik Kim, was an early Korean–American writer. His works were primarily in English but also translated into other languages such as German and Korean.

== Biography ==
Kim was born in Cheongmu, now known as Tongyeong, Chōsen. He studied English literature at Aoyama Gakuin University from 1920–1943 graduating with a PhD in English literature. At the age of 28 he traveled to the United States to study English literature at Florida Southern College. He then studied at the University of Kentucky, where he earned an MA in English literature. He later studied creative writing at the Iowa Writers' Workshop. From 1957 to 1964, Kim taught in South Korean universities including Ewha Womans University University and Korea University. Kim returned to the United States in 1965 to be closer to the publishers in the United States. He taught at the University of California, Berkeley as a visiting professor from 1972–1973 and then at Duquesne University from 1973–1990. Kim traveled to Korea for a semester in early 1995. While there, he fell ill, and subsequently died on April 11, 1995. Im Bok Kim also edited many of his works (both in English and in Korean), in spite of not being credited, although she was referenced later in an interview with the author.

He had written nonfiction, novels, essays, and collections of short stories. His stories have been published in Atlantic Monthly, The Hudson Review, Harper's Bazaar, and The New Yorker. Two of his stories were included in Martha Foley's Best American Short Stories His short story "Crown Dick" was made into a PBS film, after winning the PEN Syndicated Short Fiction Project in 1984.

Kim had several children and grandchildren. Kim's brother was Yong Shik Kim.

== Works ==
- A Book Writing Venture (Essay)
- The Sheep, Jimmy and I (New Fiction from New England: a distinctive collection of short fiction by Nationally Known Writers)
- Gourd Hollow Dance (unfinished)
- Moon Thieves (Play)
- Kim Yong Ik: short story writer (Essay)
- Home Again
- Kleiner Sohn der stillen Insel (co-author: Inge M. Artl) (1966)
- Gourd Dance Song
- The First Election (Prism International, Volume 24 by University of British Columbia. Dept. of Creative Writing)
- Blue in the Seed
- The Gold Watch (Stories, Issue 5 – Page 19)
- The Smugglers Boat
- After 17 Years
- From Below the Bridge
- From Here You Can See the Moon
- Mother's Birthday
- The Nun's Advice
- The Sea Girl
- The Seed Money
- The Sunny Side after the Harvest
- The Taste of Salt
- The Wedding Shoes
- They Won't Crack it Open
- Love in Winter (includes Love in Winter)
- Moons of Korea
- Crown Dick / Andy Crown (PBS television special)
- Ggotshin (made-for-television movie aired on KCBS) (English title: "The Wedding Shoes")
- The Diving Gourd
- The Happy Days (Translated into German as "Die glücklichen Tage: Südkorean")
- The Days of Happiness (1962)
- The Shoes from Yang San Valley
- Village Wine (Korea Journal (1983), p. 3)
- Water Root (Asian Pacific Quarterly, Seoul, 1972; Mid-American review, Volume 14)
- Spring Day, Great Fortune (The Sewanee Review, Fall 1978, Korea Quarterly, Summer 1982)
- Translation President (Short Stories International, Nov. 1983, The Hudson Review, Summer 1980)
- After Seventeen Years (Short Stories International, Fall 1980)
- American Love Song (Mid-American Review, March 1981)
- Till the Candle Blew Out (Short Story International, Nov. 1981)
- Moon Thieves (a play in three acts accepted by the Office for Advanced Drama Research, Minnesota for circulation in 1976; staged reading at Pan Asian Theatre, New York, October 1982)
- The Sunny Side After the Harvest (Short Story International, Feb. 1982)
- A Basketful of Happiness (Seeding Series Short Story International, Dec. 1982)
- The Bamboo Flute (Seedling Series Short Story International, March 1983)
- The Snake Man (Tri-Quarterly, Fall 1983)
- Village Moon (one-act comedy) (Korea Journal Dec. 1983)
- Old Korean Songs (1959) (translated by the author—published in Phoenix, Volumes 5–18 – Page 41)

== Mentions ==
- An Interview with Robert Bly
- Robert Bly, an introduction to the poetry (p. xxix)
- A community of writers: Paul Engle and the Iowa Writers' Workshop (p. 7)
- With Ossie and Ruby: In This Life Together by Ruby Dee and Ossie Davis (pp. 391–393)
- Yellow Light: The Flowering of Asian American Arts by Amy Ling (pp. 19–27)
- Guidelines: A Cross-Cultural Reading/Writing Text by Ruth Spack (pp. 42–51)
- The shapes and styles of Asian American prose fiction by Esther Mikyung Ghymn (pp. 46, 54, & 76)
- Prism international, Volume 24 by University of British Columbia. Dept. of Creative Writing
- Botteghe oscure, Issue 17 (p. 308) (1955)
- Juniorplots: a book talk manual for teachers and librarians (p. 92)
- Cumulative Bibliography of Asian Studies, 1941–1965: Author Bibliography: F-K (p. 634)
- The Little, Brown handbook (p. 837) (reprint of "A Book-Writing Venture")
- Saturday review, Volume 45 (1962) (p. 32) (discussing the "Diving Gourd")
- A parent's guide to children's reading (p. 9)
- Books for children by the American Library Association(1966) (p. 310)
- The Greenwood Encyclopedia of Multiethnic American Literature: I – M (pp. 1242–1243) (biographical)
- The Asian Pacific American heritage: a companion to literature and arts (p. 525)
- African-Asian reading guide for children and young adults (p. 233)
- The Horn Book Magazine, Volumes 36–37 (p. 562 – mentions "The Happy Days")
- Korea news review, Volume 12, Issues 27–53 (p. 26)
- Reading ladders for human relations (1968) (p. 144)
- The Publishers Weekly, Volume 186 (pp. xcix, 1)
- Asia; a guide to books for children (p. 38)
- Commonweal, Volume 81 (p. 200)
- An Index to book reviews in the humanities, Volume 3 (p. 139)
- Fiction catalog, Volume 7 (p. 85)
- Dictionary of American children's fiction, 1960–1984: recent books of Recognized Merit (p. 359)
- Korea-U.S.A. centennial, 1882–1982 (p. 85) (hailing the author as one of the most famous Korean-American writers)
- The Journal of Asian studies, Volume 24, Issues 4–5 (p. 107)
- One man's Korea by James Wade (1967) (p. 187)
- The Book list, Volume 61 by the American Library Association (p. 49)
- Catalog of Copyright Entries. Third Series: 1964: July–December (p. 1731)
- Writers for young adults: biographies master index (p. 95)
- Children experience literature (Lonsdale/Mackintosh) (p. 64)
- Children's literature in the elementary school (Huck/Kuhn) (p. 247)
- Asian Americans: a study guide and source book (p. 36)
- The case for faculty status for academic librarians (Branscomb) (p. 180)
- The Book list and subscription books bulletin, Volume 61 (American Library Association)(p. 49)
- Masterplots II.: Two-Z (p. cclxxx)
- Books abroad, Volume 44 (p. 527)
- The horn book magazine, Volume 45 (p. 476)
- Earth tales from around the world (p. 184)
- Childhood education, Volume 37 (p. 196)
- Christian herald, Volume 83 (p. 103)
- Choice: publication of the Association of College and Research Libraries, Volume 31 (p. 116)
- School libraries, Volumes 14–16 (1964) (p. 72) (American Association of School Librarians)
- Top of the news, Volumes 21–22 (American Library Association. Division of Libraries for Children and Young People – 1964)
- Best sellers, Volume 30 (Helen Dwight Educational Foundation) (p. 296)
- Interviews and Conversations with 20th-Century Authors Writing in English (Vrana) (p. 187)
- Buying Time: An Anthology Celebrating 20 Years of the Literature Program of the National Endowment for the Arts (p. 325)
- Contemporary Authors Cumulative Index March 2004, Volumes 1–123 (Gale Group) (p. 298)
- Contemporary Authors: Cumulative Index, Volumes 1–156, 2007 (p. 327)
- Illinois libraries, Volume 47 (p. 316)
- Best books for children: a catalog (p. 56)
- Korean studies: new Pacific currents (Suh) (p. 27)
- The Realist (Realist Association)(p. 32)
- The Little, Brown compact handbook (p. 47)
- Guide to the selection of books for your elementary school library, 1971–72 (p. 208)
- Literature for Children about Asians and Asian Americans: Analysis and Annotated Bibliography (Jenkins/Austin) (pp. 154, 161)
- The Atlantic monthly, Volume 237 (p. iii)
- Good reading for the disadvantaged reader: multi-ethnic resources (p. 229)
- American Ethnic Literatures : Native American, African American, Chicano/Latino, And Asian American Writers And Their Backgrounds (p. 195)
- Illustrators of children's books: 1957–1966, Books 1957–1966 (p. 268)
- Masterplots II.: Short story series, Volume 7 (p. vi)
- Wilson library bulletin, Volume 35; Volume 35 (p. 119)
- Midland: twenty-five years of fiction and poetry selected from the Writing Workshops of the State University of Iowa (p. xxviii)
- The Journal of home economics, Volume 55 (American Home Economics Association) (p. 260)
- Bibliographic Guide to East Asian Studies 1993 (p. 226)
- Good books for children;: A selection of outstanding children's books published 1950–65 (Eakin) (p. 165)
- Fifty Years: Being A Retrospective Collection... Of Novels, Novellas, Tales, Drama, Poetry, And Reportage and Essays (Fadiman) (p. 1075)
- Educational theatre journal, Volumes 7–8 (American Theatre Association) (p. 257)
- The Heath anthology of American literature, Volume 2 (p. 2460)
- Asian Americans: a study guide and sourcebook (Dunn) (p. 36)
- Short Story index : Supplement 1969–1973; an index to 11561 stories in 805 collections (Fidell) (p. 263)
- Korean literature: topics and themes (1965) (p. 119)
- Education, Volume 84 (p. 460)
- A Critical History of Children's Literature; A Survey of Children's Books in English (Meigs) (p. 562)
- Modern American women poets (Gould) (p. 279)
- Journal of death and dying, Volumes 1–2 (1970) (p. 43)
- Grade teacher, Volume 78 (1960) (p. 103)
- Elementary English, Volume 48 (1971) (p. 122)
- Speech monographs, Volumes 23–24 (1956) (p. 80)
- The writer's craft (Blau et al.) (p. 173) (1988)
- The world and south east Asia (Ziegler) (p. 386)
- Korea (Kongbobu)(p. 35)
- A Directory of American poets and fiction writers (1991)
- Minerva: Jahrbuch der gelehrten Welt, Volume 35, Part 2 (p. 2432)
- Readings for social studies in elementary education (p. 439)
- School library journal: SLJ., Volume 11 (p. 120)
- Emerging humanity; multi-ethnic literature for children and adolescents (Carlson) (p. 40)
- Books for elementary school libraries: an initial collection (Hodges)(p. 201)
- Rethinking American literature (Brannon et al.) (p. 274)
- LB brief: the Little Brown handbook, brief version (p. 62)
- Illinois Education (Illinois Education Association) (p. 113)
- Living in Korea (American Chamber of Commerce in Korea)(p. 113)
- Junior libraries, Volume 7 (1960) (p. 51)
- Guide to the selection of books for your elementary school library, 1971–72 (p. 74)
- Insight: a study of the short story (Landy et al.) (p. x)
- Best Books for Children (1965) (p. 53)
- The Book Buyer's Guide, Volume 65, Part 2 (p. 270)
- Recommended children's books: as professionally evaluated by librarians (1951) (p. 36)
- South Dakota library bulletin, Volumes 41–47 (p. 169)
- Subject index to books for intermediate grades (Eakin) (p. 32)
- Children's book review index, Volume 5 (p. 2100)
- Branch Library Book News(New York Public Library) (p. 34)
- Imprint (1963)(p. 87)
- Children's Book Review Index: A Master Cumulation 1969 Thru 1981, Volume 1 (p. 191)
- Union catalog of books on Korea in English, French, German, Russian, etc. (p. 79)
- Contemporary Authors Cumulative Index 03/2006, Volumes 1–144 (p. 316)
- Proceedings, Volume 48 (p. 198)
- Asian American literature: reviews and criticism of works by American Writers of Asian Descent (p. 469)
- Adventuring with books: a book list for elementary schools (p. 97)
- The Sewanee review: a forty-year index (p. 25)
- Monmouth County Library survey, Freehold, New Jersey (p. 31)
- New England in fiction 1787–1990: an annotated bibliography, Volume 2 (Slocum et al.) (p. 562)
- Contemporary Authors Cumulative Index, Volumes 1–262 (p. 336)
- Catalog of talking books for juvenile readers (Library of Congress – Division of the Blind) (p. 61)
- Benét's reader's encyclopedia of American literature (p. 49)
- The Junior bookshelf, Volume 26 (p. 134)
- The American humanities index, Volume 10 (p. 689)
- Best books for children (1965) (p. 63)
- Brooklyn and the world: a special Confrontation anthology issue (p. 348)
- Psychological growth through reading: an annotated guide to children's books (p. 166)
- Phoenix (1965) (p. 117)
- Juvenile author-title catalog (p. 224)
- Children's books and recordings (1957) New York Public Library (p. 26)
- Junior booklist (1961) (p. 27)
- Contemporary Authors Cumulative Index: Contemporary Authors, Volumes 1–174 (p. 347)
- Technical report, Issues 11–16 (p. 78)
- The National union catalog, 1968–1972, Volume 61 (p. 174)
- La rivista Botteghe oscure e Marguerite Caetani (p. 312)
- Österreichisches Jahrbuch, Volume 39 (p. 173)
- Majallah perpustakaan Singapura: Singapore library journal, Volumes 1–3 (p. 80)
- Zeitwenden und Stilwenden (1984)(p. 98)
- Frühe und religiöse Rechte, romanischer Rechtskreis (p. 260)
- Exkursionen: Erzählungen unserer Zeit (p. 6)
- Frankfurter Hefte, Volume 19, Issues 1–6 (p. 370)
- Bogens verden, Volume 52 (p. xiii)
- Bücherei und Bildung (p. 254)
- Background notes (United States. Dept. of State. Office of Media Services, United States. Dept. of State – Geography – 1972)
- For younger readers: Braille and talking books, Volumes 2000–2005 (p. 61)
- Children's books in print, Volume 2 (1970)
- Koreans in America (Choy)(p. 355)
- Beyond Ke'eaumoku: Koreans, nationalism, and local culture in Hawai'i (p. 140)
- Literary and library prizes, Volume 10 (p. 603)
- Politics of Parousia: reading Mark inter(con)textually (p. 178)
- Voices of modern Asia; an anthology of twentieth-century Asian literature (p. 384)
- Korean traditional culture (p. 359)
- A guide to the collection of the Asian Library (p. 422)
- Contemporary Authors, Volumes 61–64 (p. 68)
- 200 contemporary authors: bio-bibliographies of selected leading writers (Harte et al.) (p. 1926)
- Die Neue Bücherei, Issues 1–5 (p. 603)
- Texte für den Deutschunterricht: Geschichten, Volume 5 (p. 95)
- School libraries, Volumes 1–10 (American Association of School Libraries) (p. 47)
