= Han Moo-sook =

South Korean writer (1918–1993)

- Born: October 25, 1918
- Died: 1993 (aged 74–75)
- Occupation: Novelist
- Writing career
- Language: Korean

Korean name
- Hangul: 한무숙
- Hanja: 韓戊淑
- RR: Han Musuk
- MR: Han Musuk

Han Moo-sook (Korean: 한무숙; 1918–1993) was a South Korean writer. Her name may also be rendered in English as "Han Musuk", "Han Moo-suk", "Han Musook", "Mu-suk Han" or "Han Mu-suk".

== Life ==
Han Moo-sook was born October 25, 1918, in Seoul and graduated from Pusan Girls’ High School. She initially studied fine arts but switched to literature after she married Kim Zin-hoong in 1941. She has five children. Active in literary and artistic circles as well, Han Moo-sook held various posts, serving as the director of Korean P.E.N. Club, the National Museum of Korea, and Korean Women Writers’ Assembly. Han died in 1993.

Han Moo-sook was a reclusive housewife who "whisked away" the first prize in a novel writing contest in the early 1941 After that she traveled from one literary triumph to another. Han received first prizes in drama competitions with a one-act play, Heart, in 1943 and a four-act play, Frost Flowers, in 1944. In 1948, in a competition sponsored by the newspaper Kukche Sinbo, she received first prize for her full-length novel, And So Flows History. She won the Asia Foundation's Freedom Literature Award for a short story entitled "Abyss" (1957) and the Republic of Korea National Literature Award for her novel Encounter (1986). Han published her first novel, The Changes of History, with Jai-Yaing Press and received popular acclaim. She also published short stories including "Broken Image," "Coming Home," "Stone," "The Emotional Complex," and "A Halo Around the Moon."

== Work ==
Han Moo-sook's fiction often embraces purity through literature. While many Korean writers were enveloped in nihilism or existentialism, Han Moo-sook made her mark by warmly rendering human joys rather than engaging in cynical pessimism. Her themes varied from universal concerns including love and suffering to issues specific to the Korean context, including her portrayal of the anguish of a generation that witnessed the brief democratic euphoria of the 1960 April 19 Revolution. All her works, however reveal her multitude of literary skills including vivid description of customs, precise language, and skillful representations of inner consciousness.

== Works in English ==
- In the Depths
- Encounter: A Novel of Nineteenth-Century
- Running Water Hermitage

== Awards ==
- 1989: Samil Prize
