= Korean science fiction =

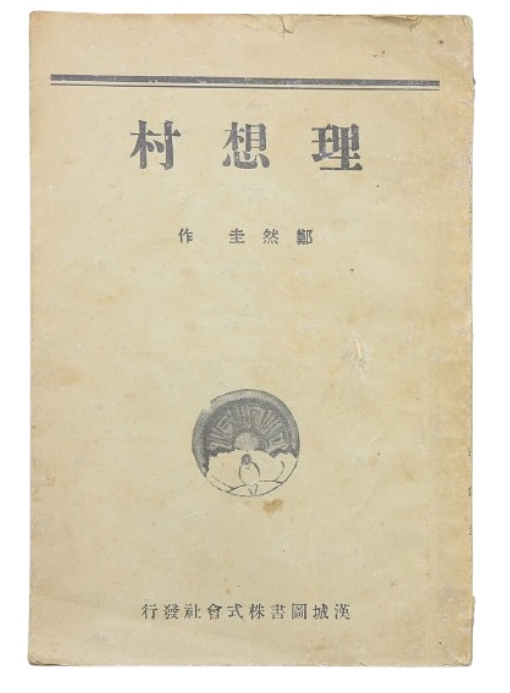
Front cover of 1923 edition of Ideal Village by Jeong Yeon-gyu, possibly the first Korean work of science fiction Interview with historian of science Dong-Won Kim on science fiction in Korea

Korean science fiction refers to the production and reception of science fiction literature, film, television, comics, and other media in pre-division Korea, and later, in both North and South Korea. The first few Korean works of science fiction were written in the 1920s. Like in many other places, science fiction was historically marginalized in Korea, dismissed by critics and scholars, and associated with youth literature and promotion of science. Since the 1980s, South Korean science fiction evolved into a significant mode of cultural expression and now forms an important part of the country's popular culture, reflecting the country's evolving relationship with technology and democracy, while serving as an expression of societal concerns. The genre also exists in North Korea, where it remains much more constrained; nonetheless, North Korean science fiction is considered one of the most innovative literary genres in the country.

== Early history and Japanese colonial period ==
Science fiction was introduced to Korea at the turn of the twentieth century, in the context of the national enlightenment movement. The first science fiction work published in Korea was Jules Verne's Twenty Thousand Leagues Under the Seas, serialized in a Korean magazine Taegukhakbo in the years 1907-1908. According to some sources, the first Korean work of science fiction was Kim Dong-in's 1929 short story "Dr. K's Research" (the title has also been translated to English as "The Study of Dr. K"). Jeong Yeon-gyu's (정연규) novel Ideal Village (이상촌; 理想村), published in 1921, has also been argued to be the first. However, the genre failed to develop during Japanese colonial rule (1910–1945) due to limited science education and ambivalence or outright resistance toward technoscientific modernity promoted by and subsequently associated with the Japanese.

After Korea's independence in 1945 and the division into North and South Korea in 1948, science fiction became part of mass culture in both countries.

== In North Korea ==
In the North, science fiction developed steadily through the 1950s, as initially it was associated with promotion of science and education, seen as crucial for the economic development and therefore endorsed by the communist parties worldwide; it was also tied to communist propaganda that juxtaposed communist approach to science, portrayed as disinterested, altruistic, and international, with capitalist one, focused on personal gain. The first science fiction story in North Korea appeared in a 1950 magazine "World of Science" (과학의 세계); it was a translation of a Soviet Russian science fiction story (Vladimir Obruchev's "Planetary Flight"). The first works of science fiction created in North Korea appeared a few years later, after the Korean War. Some early North Korean science fiction writers included Sok Yun-gi, Pae Pung and Hong Sung-won (Last Lifeline, 1965).

The development of North Korean science fiction was eventually curtailed from the late 1960s as it was not compatible with the Kim Il Sung's personality cult and the Juche ideology, which came to dominate the North Korea's political and cultural landscape, leading to literary narratives heavily focusing on stories about anti-Japanese guerrilla warfare and pioneers, preferably closely related to the figure of Kim Il Sung himself. Science fiction did not, however, disappear from North Korean literary landscape, and after a brief pause, North Korean magazines and publishers started to publish science fiction stories again in the mid-1970s. These stories universally praised progress (such as developments of robots) attributed to the advancements in the "juche science". Effectively the stories that were allowed to be published were less about the possibilities of science, and more about promoting the strict adherence to party guidelines, which, if dutifully followed, would lead to a glorious future.

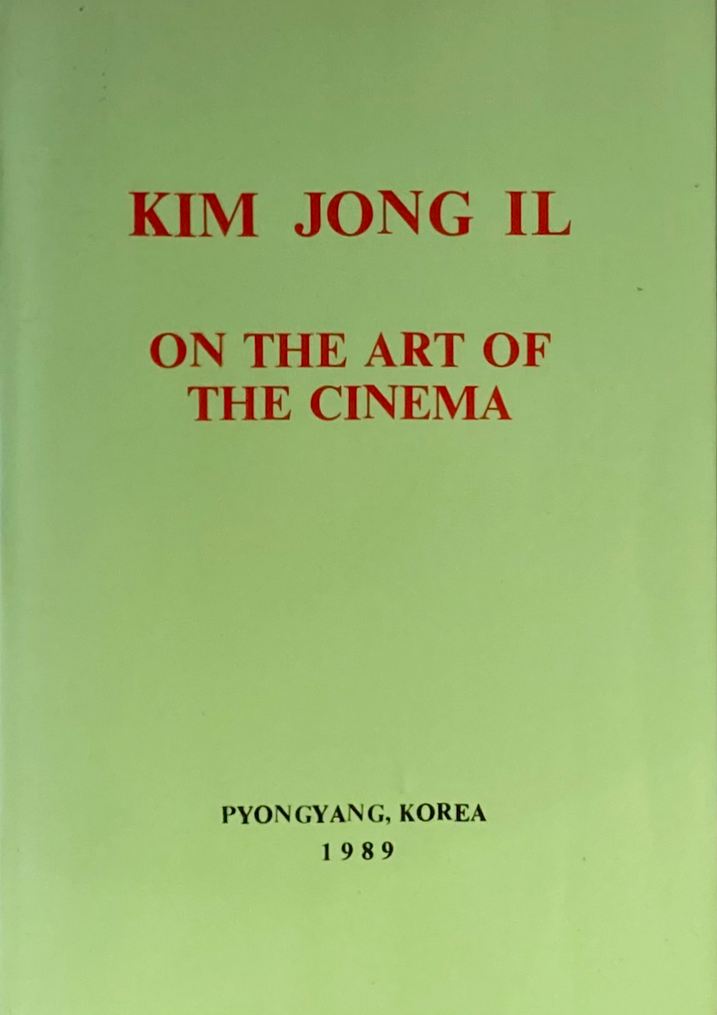
The cover page of the English-language edition of On the Art of the Cinema, Kim Jong Il's treatise on filmmaking

Kim Jong Il, the second Supreme Leader of North Korea, was an avid cinephile. In 1973 he published the treatise On the Art of the Cinema, which details his views on filmmaking as both an art form and a tool of propaganda. In 1978, the North Korean government abducted the South Korean filmmaker Shin Sang-ok and his ex-wife, the actress Choi Eun-hee. While in North Korea, Shin Sang-ok and Choi Eun-hee were forced to create seven films, including, most famously, Pulgasari, a science fantasy kaiju film heavily influenced by Japanese tokusatsu films such as the Godzilla franchise. The two escaped in 1986. The films produced by the two while in North Korea are considered to have been significant milestones in the history of Korean cinema, and Pulgasari later became the first North Korean film to be shown in South Korean theaters. Pulgasari has also become a cult classic outside of North Korea. North Korean science fiction literature saw a resurgence under Kim Jong Il due to his slight loosening of literary censorship, as he was an avid fan of foreign science fiction media.

1988 saw the publication of Hwang Chŏngsang's novella Green Ears of Rice, about scientists who develop a plant that cures cancer; according to some accounts, the novella was positively reviewed by Kim Jong Il himself, who called it a model for future works he wanted to see. Subsequent years also saw a number of translations of international science fiction in North Korea (although these were mostly limited to classics from the Soviet Union). In 1993 Hwang published his critical work, The Creation of Science Fiction Literature, which included a number of quotes from Kim Jong Il praising science fiction. In 2000, Chosŏn munhak (Korean Literature), North Korea's main literary magazine, started publishing science fiction stories, and science fiction books begun to be published by North Korean mainstream press agencies (previously, they tended to be published by their youth literature imprints). North Korea's third leader, Kim Jong Un, has also been described as supportive of science education, and his ascent to power in 2011 does not seem to have affected the situation of North Korean science fiction.

North Korean science fiction has been praised as innovative in the context of North Korean literature, inspired by international popular culture. Nonetheless, North Korean works of science fiction tend to remain highly didactic and nationalistic (toeing the party line, portraying the might and superiority of peace-loving North Korea, expressing support for the country's leadership and disdain for duplicitous Western and capitalist countries). However, the figure of North Korean supreme leaders is generally absent in North Korean science fiction works, which has been explained by Korean literature researcher Kim Minsun, who wrote: "To imagine and project the future of this entity that can never be at fault is close to impossible".

Modern major North Korean science fiction writers include Yi Kŭmch'ŏl (The Oil Field's Black Fog, 2000), who has been described as one of the country's "most prolific science fiction writers", having developed "a unique style of spectacular science fiction that mixes Cold War antagonism, spy novel tropes, and innovative military technology" (his works commonly portray American imperialists as villains, defeated by advanced North Korean technology). Other North Korean science fiction writers include Pak Chongnyŏl and Yi Ch'ŏlman. It was estimated that by the mid-2010s, North Korean writers have published about a hundred or so science fiction works (mostly short stories), with Yi Kŭmch'ŏl being the author of about twenty.

== In South Korea ==
=== Under authoritarianism ===
In the South, the genre benefited from the more liberal attitudes towards the American and, more controversially, Japanese popular cultures during the 1960s. Some of the South Korean writers of that era include Han Nak-won and Moon Yoon-Sung. The latter's Perfect Society (1967) is considered to be the first South Korean novel. 1960s also saw the first South Korean films (in the kaiju monster film genre), such as Bulgasari (1962), Space Monster Wangmagwi (1967) and Yongary, Monster from the Deep (1967). However, the genre's development was slow under the authoritarian developmentalist regimes of the 1970s and 1980s, as, ironically, the South's government moderate support for the genre (particularly in the context of promoting engagement of youth with science and technology) once again, reminiscent of the Japanese colonial era, alienated many artists who did not want to be associated with the Korean authoritarian military dictatorship of that period. Science fiction also suffered from stereotypes that labeled it as either didactic literature aimed at young readers, or as works dealing with either dry, advanced scientific concepts or absurd ideas.

However, the very same political dynamic of South Korea also led in the 1970s to the emergence of a movement known as protest (also known as minjung science fiction) - works written by writers who aligned itself with South Korea's democratization movements. This subgenre employed science fiction as a vehicle for social critique of the country's top- down militarist industrialization that could bypass the government's censorship, offering an alternative to the dominant realist aesthetics of the time. Notable works include Cho Se-hui's slipstream fiction The Dwarf (1978) and Bok Geo-il's alternative history In Search of the Epitaph: Kyŏngsŏng, Shōwa 62 (1987), both of which used science fiction tropes to critique top-down industrialization, class struggle, and state oppression.

=== Democratization and digital era ===
South Korean science fiction experienced a resurgence after the country's democratization in 1987 and the emergence of the digital era, which South Korea quickly embraced. This period since saw science fiction flourish across Korean literature, film, television, comics, webtoons, and other media. This period saw the emergence of fandom in Korea, with clubs (the first of which was the Brave New World, formed in 1989) and webzines. The latter include titles such as the SF Magazine (launched in 1993), SF Webzine (1999) and the Mirrorzine (2003). 창작기계 (Changjak Gigye, 1993) was an anthology of original Korean science-fiction short stories by multiple authors, often regarded as the first such commercially published collection in South Korea.

Following the 1997 Asian financial crisis, a wave of dystopian and absurdist science fiction reflected widespread social disillusionment of the precariat with the capitalist society, coupled with the conclusion that no realistic alternative exists. Works from this period often incorporated biting humor and dystopian settings, highlighting the sense of alienation in an increasingly globalized and neoliberal economy. Park Min-gyu's Legend of the World's Superheroes (2003) exemplifies this trend, satirizing global cultural hegemony through the character Bananaman.

Since the 1990s, feminist and queer science fiction has become a vibrant part of the South Korean science fiction scene, challenging the traditional misogynist, heteronormative and conformist South Korean society. Influenced by Western feminist writers such as Ursula K. Le Guin and Joanna Russ, Korean authors have used the genre to explore gender, sexuality, and bodily norms. The pseudonymous author Djuna's works, for instance, challenge gender binaries and social norms. Other authors have written stories exploring disability, body modification, and alternative utopias.

=== Contemporary developments ===
Second decade of the 21st century saw the emergence of book publishers in South Korea specializing in the publication of works. Science Fiction Writers Union of the Republic of Korea and Korean Science Fiction Association were founded in 2017 and 2018, respectively. 오늘의 (Today or Today's SF), described as the first South Korean commercial science fiction magazine, was established in 2019.

The Korea SF Awards were established in 2014 by the Gwacheon National Science Museum to recognize outstanding Korean science fiction works and have since become the country's principal annual awards for SF literature and media.

Today, South Korean science fiction is enjoying a peak of popularity in South Korea, driven by the country's high-tech culture and a growing demand for imaginative representations of technological change. This includes literature, big-budget films, webtoons, and television series.

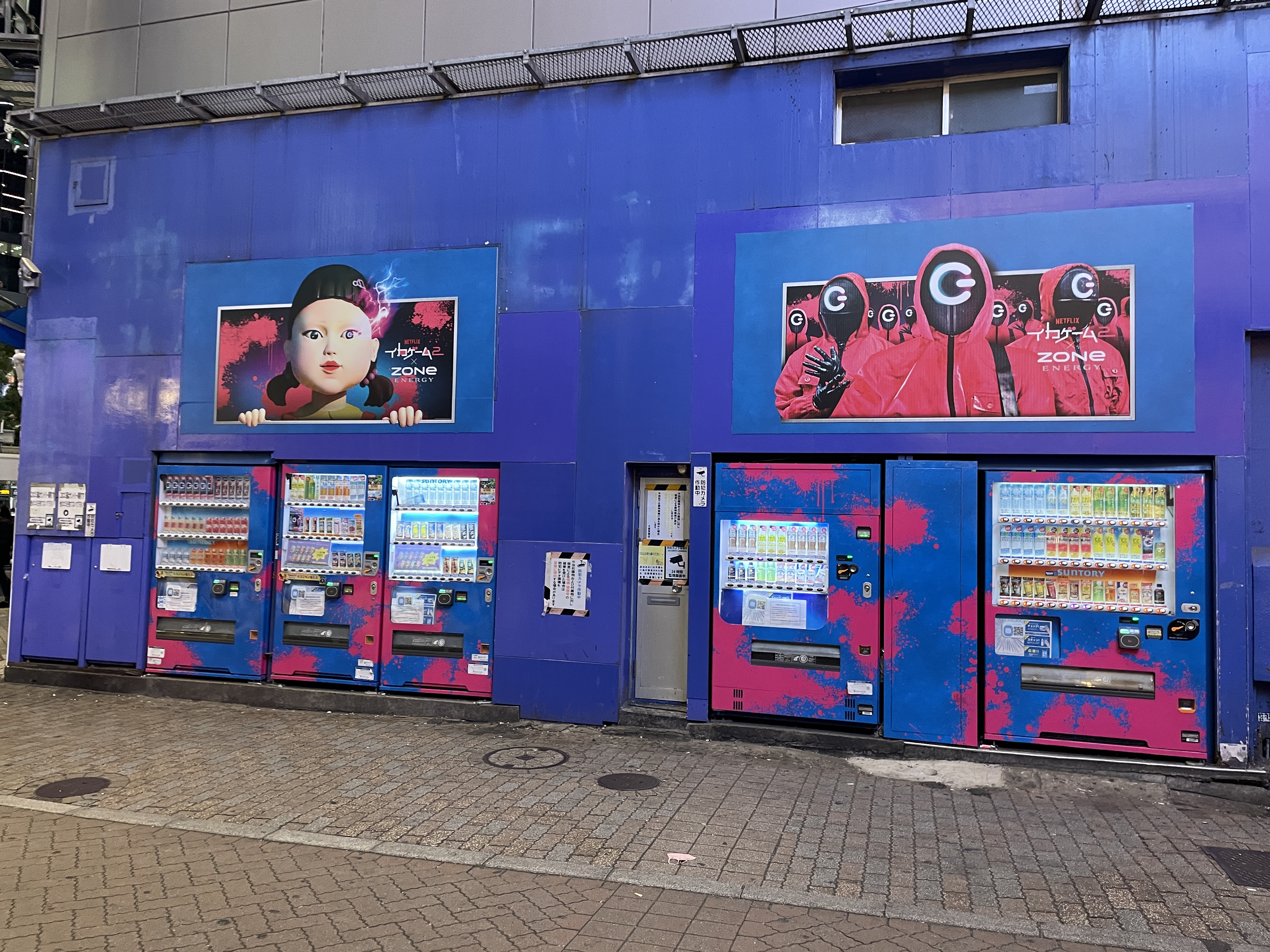
Advertising for Squid Game in Japan

Korean science fiction television series include works like The School Nurse Files (2020), SF8 (2020) and Solo Leveling (2024-). Squid Game, a South Korean dystopian survival television series that is occasionally classified as science fiction, debuted in 2021 to worldwide critical acclaim. The first season of the series became the first Korean drama to top Netflix's top ten weekly most-watched TV show charts globally. It reached number one in 94 countries, including the United States and the United Kingdom. Squid Game focuses heavily on class conflict and capitalism in both South Korean and global society. According to CNN, the show is popular in the United States because it reflects the economic struggles of many Americans: low wages, unaffordable health care, and insurmountable debts.

Korean science fiction films form a major part of modern Korean science fiction. Filmmakers such as Bong Joon-ho, Kim Moon-saeng. Jang Joon-hwan, Shin Su-won and Min Byeong-cheon have contributed significantly, with works like Natural City (2003), Sky Blue (2003), Save the Green Planet! (2003), The Host (2006), Snowpiercer (2013), Glass Garden (2017) and Okja (2017) often incorporating elements to critique class divisions and environmental issues. Other notable modern Korean movies include Jo Sung-hee's space opera Space Sweepers (2021), described as "the first Korean film set in space" (although the 1967 kaiju-genre South Korean film Yongary, Monster from the Deep already contained a short opening set in space). In 2023, Korean sci-fi movie Jung E, directed by Yeon Sang-ho, topped Netflix popularity charts for non-English media.

Notable modern South Korean sci-fi writers and their works include Bae Myung-hoon (Smart D, 2006), Chang Kang-myoung, Chung Serang, Kim Bo-young (On the Origin of Species, 2021), Kim Chang-gyu (Noesu, 2015), Kim Cho-yeop (Those Who Chose Exile, 2019), Jeong Soyeon (Cosmic Go, 2009), Park Seong-hwan (Readymade Boddhisattva, 2004) and Yi Chong-san (Customers, 2017).

In 2019 Kaya Press published an anthology of Korean short science fiction stories, Readymade Bodhisattva, described as the "first book-length English language translation of science and speculative fiction from South Korea."

== Themes ==
A distinctive feature of Korean science fiction is that it draws upon uniquely Korean sentiments and experiences, setting it apart from Western-centric perspectives. Korean science fiction often addresses issues of national identity, class struggle, and state oppression, reflecting the history of colonization, authoritarianism, and rapid modernization in both North and South Korea. It also explores gender, sexuality, disability, and environmental concerns, frequently serving as a vehicle for social critique and democratic discourse. A number of modern works that continue the spirit of protest and criticize the modern world order and society, contain anti-Western or anti-American sentiment. The 21st century saw the emergence of a zombie theme in a number of Korean works, such as Yeon Sang-ho's Train to Busan (2016) and its spin-offs and the 2019 Kingdom TV series.

North Korean science fiction rarely makes use of themes such as dystopia, alternate history, or the far future. This is to avoid any implications of political dissent, governmental instability, the nonexistence of North Korea, or any other ideas that may be construed as ideologically opposed to the government.

== See also ==
- Cinema of Korea
- Korean horror
