= Kim Oki =

South Korean saxophonist

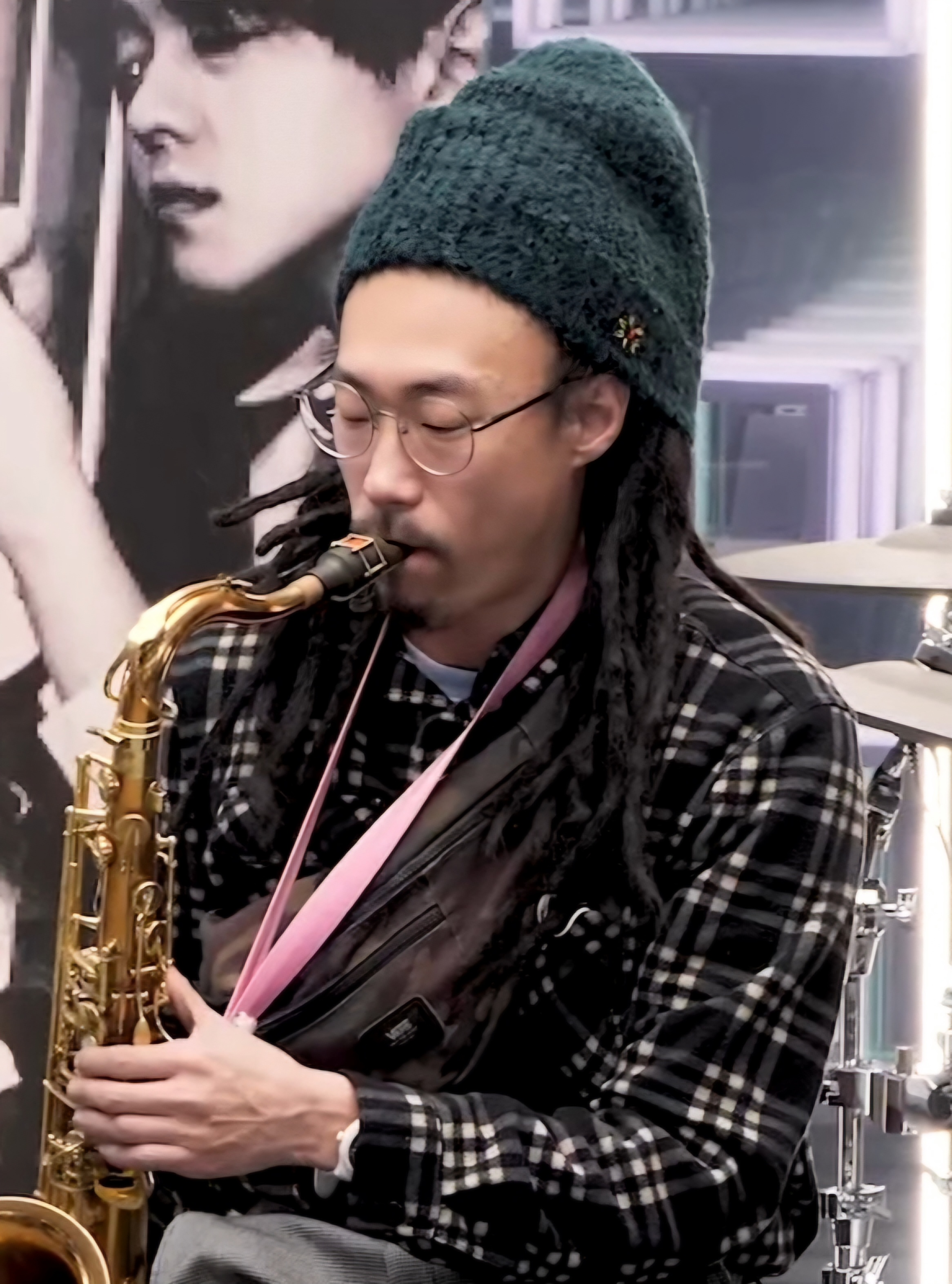

Background information
- Also known as: Kim Oki Oriental Youth, Kim Oki Fucking Madness, Kim Oki Saturn Ballad
- Origin: South Korea
- Genres: Jazz, avant-garde music
- Years active: 2013–present
- Label: Bongsik

Kim Oki (Korean: 김오키) is a South Korean saxophonist, and former breakdancer. He debuted in 2013 with his studio album Cherubim's Wrath (천사의 분노), and has since released numerous projects and albums. He collaborated with various artists including Park Jiha, Lowdown 30, Hippy Was Gipsy, Say Sue Me, and Bek Hyunjin. He won the Musician of the Year at the 2020 Korean Music Awards.

== Career ==
Kim Oki was a former breakdancer and a backup dancer to Sechs Kies. He first learned saxophone when he was 25. As for how he started the saxophone, he interviewed that after being impressed by Miles Davis' trumpet songs, he mistook him for a saxophonist at the time and learned to play saxophone. He debuted in 2013 with his first studio album Cherubim's Wrath (천사의 분노), which he once said was inspired by a Jo Sehui's novel "The Dwarf." He won Best Jazz & Crossover Performance at the 2014 Korean Music Awards.

He was also active under the stage names of Kim Oki Oriental Youth (김오키 동양청년), Kim Oki Fucking Madness (김오키뻐킹매드니스), and Kim Oki Saturn Ballad (김오키 새턴 발라드). He participated in Park Jiha's debut album Communion in 2016. Lowdown 30's song Hotter featuring him won the Best Rock Song at the Korean Music Awards.

He released his studio album Saturn Meditation (새턴메디테이션) in 2018, and an album Spirit Advance Unit (스피릿 선발대) in 2019. Park Sangjoon of Music Y described the album as "Kim Oki's music sufficiently sheds light on certain poor lives, and certain lives that are mean and always prepared, even if he is not poor." He won the Musician of the Year at the 2020 Korean Music Awards.

== Studio albums ==
- Cherubim`s Wrath (천사의 분노) (2013)
- Tumultuous Time Travelling (격동의 시간여행) (2015)
- The Great Root (거대한 뿌리) (2016)
- LUVOKI (2016)
- Fucking Madness (뻐킹매드니스) (2017)
- Peace To Our Soul (피스투아우어솔) (2017)
- Public Domain for Me (퍼블릭도메인포미) (2018)
- Saturn Meditation (새턴메디테이션) (2018)
- Spirit Advance Unit (스피릿선발대) (2019)
- For My Angel (포 마이 엔젤) (2020)
- Kwak Orchestra (곽경수 오케스트라) (2020)
- Big Picture (2020)
- Yun Hyong-keun (윤형근) (2020)
- Everytime (2021)
- About Prejudice (편견에 대하여) (2021)
- Strange, True Beauty (스트레인지, 트루 뷰티) (2021)
- Greeting (안부) (2022)
- Love Flower (러브플라워) (2022)
