= North Korean literature =

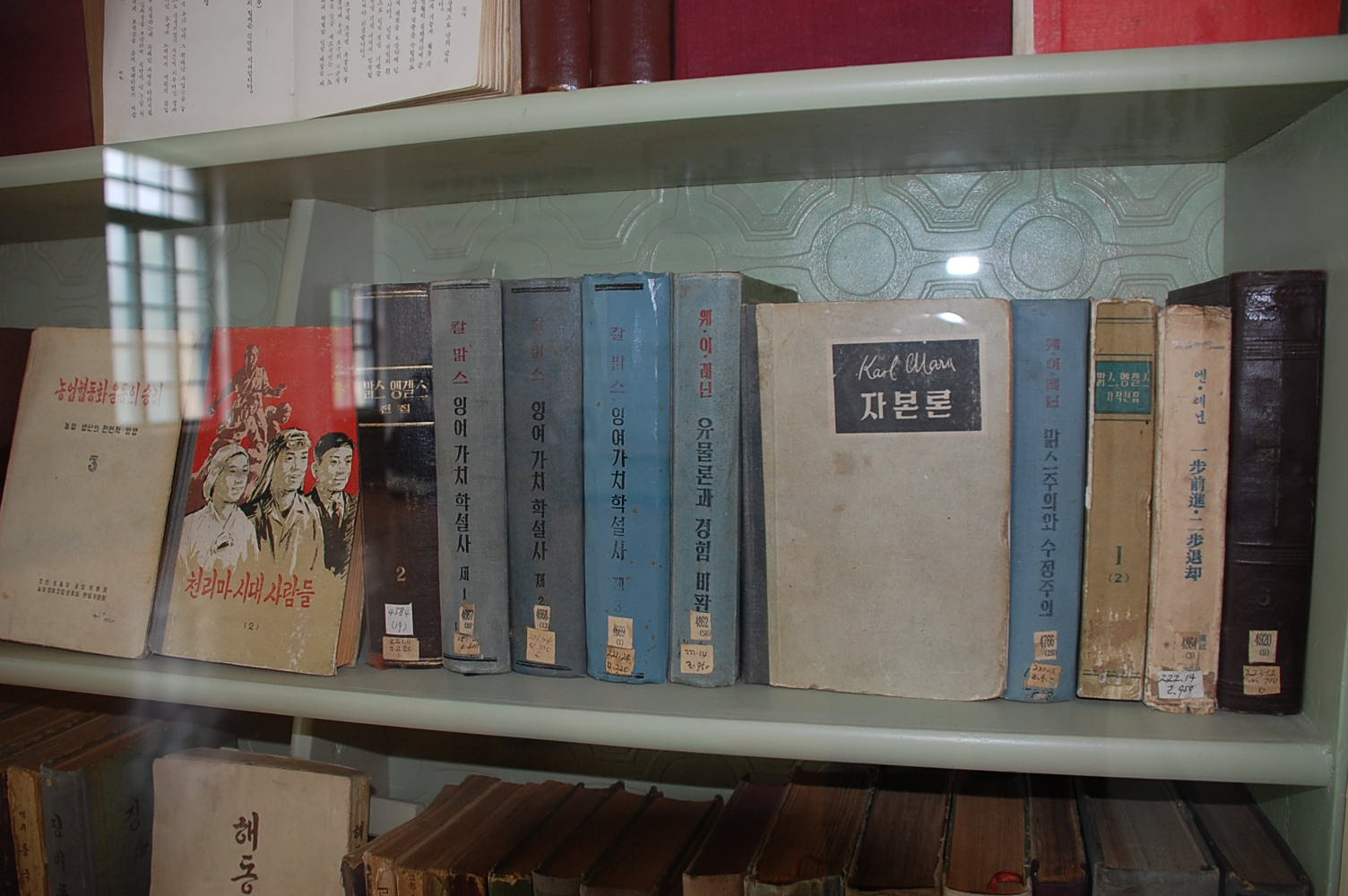
Books on display at the Grand People's Study House in Pyongyang

Reading is a popular pastime in North Korea, where literacy and books enjoy a high cultural standing, elevated by the regime's efforts to disseminate propaganda as texts. Because of this, writers are held in high prestige.

The division of Korea following the Second World War led to a considerable cross-border movement, which included writers moving from North to South or from South to North.

North Korea's subsequent literary tradition was shaped and controlled by the State. The "Guidelines for Juche Literature", published by the official Korean Writers' Alliance (Korean: 조선 작가 동맹), emphasised that literature must extoll the country's leader, Kim Il Sung, and, later, Kim Jong Il. Only members of the Writers' Alliance are authorised to have their works published.

== History ==
=== Background ===
Russian, and later Soviet, literature were popular in pre-liberation North Korea. Koreans viewed Russian literature very differently from Western audiences, searching for Confucian undertones of social engineering. While Westerners appreciated works like Leo Tolstoy's Anna Karenina and War and Peace, Koreans mostly ignored these works but enjoyed his works on religion and moral treatises. Of Soviet writers, Maxim Gorky in particular was popular.

=== 20th century ===
The foundations of socialist North Korean literature were laid in the period between 1945 and 1960s, when North Korea adopted many Soviet-style forms of organization. Along with them, restrictions and political imperatives found their way to literature. Immediately after the liberation, North Korea followed in the footsteps of Soviet literature. But by the de-Stalinization of the mid-1950s in the Soviet Union, the relationship changed. Kim Il Sung saw the moment as an opportunity to lessen the control of the Soviets and increase his own. He accomplished this by denouncing all things "foreign" in literature in a speech entitled "On Eliminating Dogmatism and Formalism and Establishing Juche in Ideological Work". From there on, North Korean literature would have a nationalistic outlook, but Soviet elements introduced during the 1940s would remain steadfast.

According to B. R. Myers, the work of Cho Ki-chon in the late 1940s exemplifies particular traits of the early cult of personality of Kim Il-sung built upon Soviet Marxism–Leninism and bloc conformity. They were soon replaced by the Korean ethnic nationalism of writers like Han Sorya. While Cho's Kim Il Sung is a brilliant strategist who has masculine qualities like strength and intellect, in Han's works he embodies traditional Korean virtues of innocence and naivety having "mastered Marxism–Leninism with his heart, not his brain". The ethnically inspired style of Han would establish itself as the standard of propaganda over Cho's.

Attitude toward foreign literature changed after the 1967 Kapsan faction incident. People were forced to burn many of their books or donate them to library collections. Among authors whose books were destroyed were Tolstoy, Gorky, and Fyodor Dostoevsky. Books on Chinese, Greek, and German philosophy were eradicated as well. Researchers could access the works of Karl Marx only at designated libraries and by supplying a reason for studying his work.

According to "court poet" and now defector Jang Jin-sung, prior to 1994, when Supreme Leader Kim Il Sung was alive, the art of the novel was preeminent. Nearly all the top state honors such as the Kim Il Sung Medal, the Order of Heroic Effort, and the title of Kim Il Sung Associate were awarded to the state's novelists. The novel's length was a perfect medium to expound on the great deeds of Kim Il Sung, who was himself both an avid reader and writer of novels. After his death in 1994, the novel was replaced by poetry, which was largely due to the country's economic problems which made paper very expensive and poetry about the deeds of Dear Leader could be reproduced easily in a single newspaper page. Shorter poetry was most common, while the longer epic genre was restricted to just six poets, who were also the poets laureate of North Korea. Epic poetry (and film) became the chief vehicle of political propaganda under Kim Jong Il.

Kim Jong Il was an avid fan of science fiction, and the genre saw a resurgence under his rule due to a slight loosening of literary censorship. He personally endorsed Green Ears of Rice, a 1988 science fiction novel by Hwang Chŏngsang.

The DPRK Ministry of Culture promoted North Korean literature in Russia and China during the Cold War era. Several Soviet Koreanists published studies on DPRK literature and translations in Russian. Among the novelists translated into Russian and Chinese were:

- Ri Ki-yong (1895–1984).
- Hong Myong-hui (1888–1968), writer of Im Kkokjong (임꺽정) based on the life of the Korean nationalist hero Im Kkokjong (died 1562).
- Han Sorya author of the novella Jackals (1951).

Works published in Choson Munhak, the Korean Writers' Alliance's monthly literary journal, are accessible by subscription abroad.

Many authors of highly significant political texts fell out of favor with the populace. As a result, North Korean publishing authorities would employ a policy of favoring collective creations of creative teams and withholding the names of individual contributors. This practice was observed most closely in the 1970s and started to wane in the 1980s. Regardless, its legacy is that even today North Koreans are very ignorant about the biographical details of their most read authors.

=== 21st century ===
As Ha-yun Jung puts it, "[i]f there is an underground network of dissident writers secretly circulating their writings under the watchful eyes of the Workers' Party, the world has not heard from them yet". In 2006, Words Without Borders included the works of four North Korean writers, translated into English, in its anthology Literature from the "Axis of Evil". Kang Kwi-mi's short story "A Tale of Music", published in Choson Munhak in February 2003, tells the tale of a young Zainichi Korean who discovers he is skilled at playing the trumpet, moves to North Korea, and relinquishes music in favour of stonemasonry. His passion for the "music" of stones is caused by the greatness of Kim Jong Il as expressed through stone monuments. Lim Hwa-won's short story "The Fifth Photograph" is told from the perspective of a North Korean woman who visits post-Soviet Russia in the early 1990s, and finds a country in a state of moral turmoil for having turned its back on socialism. The narrator blames insidious American influence for Russia's woes, and emphasises the need for strong ideological commitment in North Korea. Byungu Chon's poem "Falling Persimmons" evokes the emotional suffering caused by the partition of Korea, and hopes for reunification.

The anthology also contains an excerpt from Hong Seok-jung's 2002 novel Hwangjini, which received the 2004 Manhae Literary Prize – the first time the South Korean literary award had been conferred upon a North Korean writer. Hwangjini is a historical novel set in the sixteenth century.

Contemporary North Korean writers come in different ranks, some earning more than the others. Regardless, most writers remain relatively obscure: their pictures or biographical details are not made known to the reading public and mentions in anthologies and interviews are rare. Literary awards do exist, but results are not widely published. Consequentially, even literary professionals in North Korea are relatively oblivious about North Korean literature. Tatiana Gabroussenko describes how, when she interviewed such defectors, she:

repeatedly came across experienced school teachers of literature who would claim, for instance, that Na Do-hyang, whose works they once studied and then taught, had allegedly belonged to KAPF (Korean Proletarian Artist Federation), or that New Spring in Seokkaeul was written by Lee Gi-yeong [Ri Ki-yong]. The equivalent of this in Western literature would be to mistake a poem of [William] Shakespeare for that of [Rudyard] Kipling.

By the 2010s, there had been about 100 works of science fiction literature published in North Korea; the author Yi Kŭmch'ŏl had written about 20 of these, accounting for around one-fifth of all North Korean science fiction literature.

== Themes and literary techniques ==
North Korean literature is almost always characterized as socialist realism. A notable exception in Western scholarship is B. R. Myers, who argues that socialist realism has "failed" in the country and North Korean works do not have the traits of socialist realist literature.

Without exception, North Korean fiction seeks to instill a teaching in the mind of the reader. Almost every story includes an exemplary character whose upright behavior is to be emulated. A recurring storyline is the protagonist's initial misunderstanding of a hard-working person as emotionally cold and eventual realisation that hard work is in fact an instance of love felt for the nation. It is usually this protagonist that comes to realisation rather than the idealised character that the reader is supposed to identify with.

A prominent theme of North Korean fiction is hagiography of the leaders. Hagiography is particularly evident in novels. In particular, Kim Il Sung is depicted in both historical (the Anti-Japanese struggle) and contemporary contexts. Han Sorya's History (MR: Ryŏksa) was the first long work to deal with Kim Il Sung during the Anti-Japanese struggle, whereas The Immortal History (MR: Pulmyŏl-ŭi ryŏksa) and The Immortal Leadership (MR: Pulmyŏl-ŭi hyangdo) are classics that praise Kim Il Sung and Kim Jong Il respectively.

During the Kim Jong Il era and the economic hardship following the collapse of the Soviet Union, a mystique of work emerged as a main propaganda theme in North Korean novels, which portrayed brave North Koreans who “worked for spiritual enlightenment rather than for material gain.” A prominent example of such novels was Song Sangwŏn's Taking Up Bayonets (MR: Ch’onggŏm ŭl tŭlgo) (2002).

North Korean fiction provides insights into how foreigners, in particular Russians are viewed. During the 1940s and 1950s Soviet Russians were portrayed as ideological guides of Koreans. In literature from the 2000s, the tables have turned and now Russians look up to Koreans as the interpreters of socialist values and initiative. For instance, Rim Hwawon's representative short story, "The Fifth Photo" follows the ordeal of a Russian girl in a post-Soviet world. The protagonist with a revolutionary family history enters university, where she is exposed to "dangerous ideas". She is seduced by an American student, who, it turns out, is in fact a Russian whose ancestors were anti-communist landlords. The Russian man had lured the protagonist in a ploy to regain the formerly nationalized lands back to his capitalist family. The protagonist is lost in the West and ends up being a prostitute. According to Andrei Lankov, the girl protagonist symbolizes modern Russia after the end of the Cold War: "Fooled into selling her heritage, she ends up a pitiful prostitute at the bottom of the merciless capitalist heap", a path that the author warns North Korea should not follow.

Transition is a particularly important literary technique in symbolising adoption of a didactic message. The characters that the reader is supposed to identify with are seen as inadequate and in process, so that a moment of reaffirming one's revolutionary commitment become possible for the reader. Thus transitory events, like the New Year, take on symbolic meaning.

Stories often evoke the pathetic fallacy: characters' emotions tend to be reflected in natural phenomena such as the weather. One reason for such a technique is that description of nature might be one of the few areas of artistic expression where authors enjoy relative freedom from political constraints. Nature as a theme, however, has undergone a transformation. Until the 1990s, man's "revolutionary struggle" is the master of nature, but, since then, nature is viewed as an external threat. The intended message is that the floods and consequent economic hardship of the 1990s are caused by factors that are not in the control of the government. The 1990s, in general, saw a turn to less romanticised portrayal in North Korean literature. However, despite portrayal of difficulties, stories tend to be optimistic and have happy endings.

North Korean science fiction focuses on the ability of North Korean scientists and engineers to produce new, fantastic technology. The protagonists are often challenged by a crisis and respond with humanitarian goals, while the adversary is often American and militaristic. Another theme is advanced technology bringing about an ideal society within an engineered environment under North Korean leadership. Unlike most other genres, North Korean SF includes nuanced portrayals of foreigners and features violence. North Korean science fiction faces an innate challenge in portraying the future as meaningfully different from the present while official North Korean propaganda holds that the country's present state is perfect thanks to an infallible leader. North Korean science fiction is relatively unknown in the West.

== Censorship ==
All published works must go through several levels of censorship, and must express a given amount of praise for the Workers' Party of Korea's policies. In addition, many writers have internalized a mentality of self-censorship. However, writers are given access to otherwise prohibited "subversive" materials they can familiarize themselves with. They can then cite problematic historical issues with realistic details. It is normal for North Korean works to cite foreign Internet materials that ordinary North Koreans do not have access to.

The choice of literary themes and methods for North Korean authors today is far more limited than it was for Soviet authors, even during the most restrictive periods of Stalinism. North Korean science fiction rarely makes use of themes such as dystopia, alternate history, or the far future. This is to avoid any implications of political dissent, governmental instability, the nonexistence of North Korea, or any other ideas that may be construed as ideologically opposed to the government.

== Works published abroad ==
As of 2020 some North Korean works were published in South Korea. Most works published in English at that time were related to dissidents, with few non-dissident works being available in English.

Some autobiographies written by North Korean exiles published since 2000 contain grim accounts of life in North Korea, such as Kang Chol-hwan's The Aquariums of Pyongyang (2000) and Hyok Kang's This Is Paradise! (2005). These "escape-from-North-Korea" narratives have sold well in democratic countries as a foil for the "worst kind of government imaginable", emphasizing Orwellian 1984 bizarre aspects. Critics are uncertain if the books have led to changes in human rights abuses or are mostly "grim escapism".

Bandi is a pseudonymous North Korean short story writer and poet whose dissenting stories and poems have been smuggled out and published in the West. They include The Red Years and The Accusation.

Paek Nam-nyong is a member of the elite group of writers called April 15 Literary Production Unit. His novel Friend, a story of a young couple on the brink of divorce, based on his observations of proceedings at the divorce court, was translated into English and published by Columbia University Press in May 2020. The French version of the novel was published by Actes Sud in 2011.

== See also ==
- Cho Ki-chon, poet
- Culture of North Korea
- Kim Il Sung bibliography
- Kim Jong Il bibliography
- Korean literature
- North Korean writers
- North Korean studies
