= Counterweight (disambiguation) =

A counterweight is a weight that provides balance and stability in a mechanical system.

Counterweight may also refer to:

- "Counterweight" (The Outer Limits), a 1964 television episode
- Counterweight, an organization founded by British author Helen Pluckrose
- Counterweight, an alias of the fictional comics character Jack Power
- Counterweight, an alias of the fictional comics character Katie Power
- Counterweight, a 2021 novel by South Korean author Djuna
