= A Small Ball Shot by a Midget =

- Theatrical poster
- Hangul: 난장이가 쏘아올린 작은 공
- RR: Nanjangiga ssoaollin jageun gong
- MR: Nanjangiga ssoaollin chagŭn kong
- Directed by: Lee Won-se
- Written by: Hong Pa
- Based on: The Dwarf by Cho Se-hui
- Produced by: Han Gap-jin
- Starring: Jeon Yang-ja; Ahn Sung-ki; Kim Choo-ryeon
- Cinematography: Park Seung-bae
- Edited by: Kim Hyeong-ju
- Music by: Jeong Min-seob
- Release date: 17 October 1981
- Running time: 100 minutes
- Country: South Korea
- Language: Korean

A Small Ball Shot by a Midget (Korean: 난장이가 쏘아올린 작은 공; RR: Nanjangiga ssoaollin jageun gong) is a 1981 South Korean film by Lee Won-se based on the same-titled novel by Cho Se-hui. It is about a dwarf and his poor, but loving, family who are forced out of their house by a real estate agent.

== Cast ==
- Jeon Yang-ja
- Ahn Sung-ki
- Kim Choo-ryeon
- Geum Bo-ra
- Jeon Young-sun
- Lee Hyo-jung
- Kim Bul-i
- Chu Seok-yang
- Sung Moung-sun
- Choe Seok
