= Communion (Park Jiha album) =

Studio album by Park Jiha
- Released: November 24, 2016
- Genre: Avant-garde jazz, gugak, postminimalism
- Length: 48:36
- Label: tak:til

Park Jiha chronology
Communion (2016)	Philos (2018)

Communion is the debut studio album by South Korean musician Park Jiha. The album was released on 24 November 2016.

== Background ==
Park Jiha was a member of the group Sum from 2008 to 2016. She interviewed the album name as "After I finish the song, I think about the name I came across the word by chance, and I thought Communion was the most appropriate title that could penetrate my album with just one word. Communion also means "spiritual" and "holy charye."" Saxophonist Kim Oki played of the saxophone part of the album.

== Critical reception ==
Professional ratings
Aggregate scores
Source	Rating
Metacritic	78/100
Review scores
Source	Rating
The Guardian	4/5 stars
IZM	3/5 stars
Louder Than War	8/10
Mojo	4/5 stars
Pitchfork	7.0/10
Uncut	7/10

Communion was well received by music critics. On review aggregator website, Metacritic, Communion received an average rating of 78 out of 100 based on five professional critic reviews, indicating "generally favorable reviews". Robin Denselow of The Guardian reviewed "The result is an intriguing instrumental set that mixes minimalism and melody with bursts of furious energy and experimentation, with echoes of anything from ambient styles to free jazz." Natalie Weiner of Pitchfork said "Blending traditional Korean instruments with woodwinds and mallets, the South Korean composer strikes a captivating balance between minimalism and improvised music." The member of the selection committee for the 2017 Korean Music Awards Seojeongmingab described the album as "Different instruments became a landscape and a story" and nominated it for best jazz and crossover record.

== Track listing ==
No.	Title	Length
1.	"Throughout the Night..." ("밤을 도와…")	5:00
2.	"Accumulation of Time" ("시간의 축적")	6:40
3.	"Communion"	6:56
4.	"Sounds Heard From the Moon" ("달에게서 전해 들은 소리")	9:05
5.	"The Longing of the Yawning Divide" ("멀어진 간격의 그리움")	3:17
6.	"All Souls' Day"	9:05
7.	"The First Time I Sat Across From You" (마주 앉은 첫 마음) (with Saxophone version)	8:33
