= Saturn Meditation =

Studio album by Kim Oki
- Released: 14 November 2018
- Genre: Jazz
- Length: 54:22
- Label: BTP

Kim Oki chronology
Public Domain For Me (2018)	Saturn Meditation (2018)	Spirit Advance Unit (2019)

Saturn Meditation (Korean: 새턴매디테이션) is a studio album by South Korean saxophonist Kim Oki. The album was released on 14 November 2018.

== Background ==
Saturn Meditation is a recording of Kim Oki's project Saturn Ballad, which he said was a project created by wondering what it would feel like if people lived in Saturn and played ballads there. Kim Oki interviewed the album's track, Our Love (점도면에서 최대의 사랑), saying that more than 90 percent of the songs are inspired by the heart of love. The album is one of two studio albums he released in 2018, along with Public Domain for Me, and the album featured South Korean musician and actor Bek Hyunjin.

== Critical reception ==
MM Jazz's Yoon Byeongseon described the album as a ballad work that contains the profoundness of Kim Oki:a musician who refuses to be regarded only as a jazz musician, who works mainly in Channel 1969, Itaewon, and Hongdae, not jazz clubs. Music critic Hyeon Jiwoon praised the album, and he said "His music is always two steps ahead. If you want to draw the topography of Korean pop music properly, you have to listen to Kim Oki's music."

== Track listing ==
No.	Title	Length
1.	"Saturn Entrance" ("새턴엔트란스")	3:13
2.	"Their Language" ("그들의 언어") (featuring Bek Hyunjin)	4:38
3.	"Our Love" ("점도면에서 최대의 사랑")	10:29
4.	"Bipolar Disorder" ("양극성 장애")	4:42
5.	"No Problem" ("문제없어요")	7:28
6.	"Dopamine" ("도파민")	3:58
7.	"Lap Pillow" ("무릎베개")	5:01
8.	"Homicide" ("서로를 바라보며 어디로 가다가 xxxx")	6:00
9.	"Ending" ("크레딧") (featuring Bek Hyunjin)	3:17
10.	"Saturn Entrance1969" ("새턴엔트란스1969")	5:35
