= Djuna =

South Korean science fiction writer

- Occupation: Writer
- Writing career
- Pen name: Lee Youngsoo
- Language: Korean
- Period: 1994~
- Genre: science fiction
- Notable work: The Pacific Express

Djuna (Korean: 듀나) is a South Korean pseudonymous science fiction writer and film critic. Djuna is managed by Greenbook Agency.

== Life ==
The identity of Djuna is unknown, and Djuna prefers the personal pronoun "they." They publish all their works under the name Djuna, and interviews are done by e-mail correspondence or online chats. For some of their early works, they used the name Lee Youngsoo, but it is generally taken as a pseudonym, because Lee Youngsoo is one of the most common names in Korea.

They explain the name Djuna as coming from writer Djuna Barnes and a character in a work by the pseudonymous Ellery Queen. The capitalization was due to Djuna's belief that using lowercase letters for proper nouns was "awkward".

In 2020, Djuna succeeded Soyeon Jeong as the second president of the Science Fiction Writers Union of the Republic of Korea, leaving office in 2021.

== Works ==
Djuna debuted in 1997 with the anthology Butterfly War.

In 2023 their first major work has been translated to English (the novel Counterweight).

== Reception ==
Since the 1990s, Djuna has been one of the most prolific and important writers in the South Korean science fiction field. Djuna been described as "a literary giant in Korea".

== Selected works ==
They have published seven short story collections, six novels, and two essays.

=== Short story collections ===
- Butterfly War (나비전쟁) 1997
- Duty Free Area (면세구역) 2000
- Pacific Express (태평양 횡단 특급) 2002
- Proxy War (대리전) 2006
- Teeth of the Dragon (용의 이) 2007
- Bloody Battle on the Broccoli Field (브로콜리 평원의 혈투) 2011
- Not Yet a God (아직은 신이 아니야) 2013

=== Novels ===
- Molok (몰록) 2001
- The Shadow of Spiderweb (거미줄 그늘) 2009
- Jezebel (제저벨) 2012
- The World of Mint (민트의 세계) 2018
- There I Existed In Arcadia (아르카디아에도 나는 있었다) 2019
- Counterweight (평형추) 2021.

=== Film criticism ===
- Complaining over the Screen (스크린 앞에서 투덜대기) 2001
- Film Shakespeare (필름 셰익스피어) 2005
- Genre Encyclopedia: SF Film (장르백서 2: SF영화) 2015

=== Non-fiction ===
- Possible Spaces of Dreams: Djuna Essay (가능한 꿈의 공간들:듀나 에세이) 2015
