= List of Russian Koreanists =

Russian academics who study Korea

This list includes Russian academics who have studied the history of Korea and Russian-Korean relations. The authors of popular books and translators are not included.

== A ==
Asmolov, Konstantin Valerianovich (b. 1968)

- The system of organization and conduct of hostilities on the Korean state in the sixth to seventeenth century. Evolution of military tradition. Dissertation, 1997.

== B ==
Boltach, Julia Vladimirovna

- Monks («Жизнеописания достойных монахов страны, что к востоку от моря» (XIII в.) как источник по ранней истории Кореи.) Early history of Korea. Dissertation. St. Petersburg, 2007.
- Kakhun. Hedon kosyn Jong. (Какхун. Жизнеописания достойных монахов Страны, что к востоку от моря : Хэдон косын чон). Ed. with hanmun and comments. V. Boltachev. St. Petersburg, St. Petersburg State University Publishing House. 2007. 182 p.

Buhay, Nikolai Fedorovich (b. 1941)

- The Third Korea: new mission and the challenges of globalization. M., 2005. 272 pages

Butin, Yuri Mikhailovich

- Ancient Choson (historical and archaeological sketch). Novosibirsk, Nauka. 1982. 330 pages 1650 copies.
- Korea: From the Joseon Dynasty to the Three States (Second century. BC. E.-Fourth century.). Novosibirsk, Nauka. 1984. 255 pages 1200 copies.
- Korea in the era of the early states. Abstract. diss. ... On and. Mb. L., 1986.
- Economic History of East Asia. Irkutsk, Publisher Irkut. Univ. 1994. 269 p. 500 copies.

== C ==
Choi, Yevgenii B.

- Choi EB, Guschina AM, Hwang AN Russia - Korea: dialogue of cultures. Novosibirsk, NTGU. 2005. 186 p.

Choi, Ina Valeriantovna (b. 1973)

- Korea's prose 1920s-30s: New and traditional stories in Kim Fineness, 1900–1951 years. AD .. Oriental Studies. St. Petersburg, 2003.

Choi Dokka

- Russia in Korea: 1893–1905. (Policy M-va Finance and Marine M-va). St. Petersburg, Zero. 1996. 159 pages (the same: Authob. Thesis. ... K.. N. SPb, 1996)

== D ==
Denisov, Valery Iosifovich

- The Korean problem: a solution to, 70s-80s. MA, International Relations. 1988. 139 pages

Dzharylgasinova, Rosa Shotaevna (b. 1931)

- Koreans. (Historical-ethnographic research). Abstract. diss. ... K.. Mb. M., 1962.
- Ancient Koguryo people (to the ethnic history of Koreans). Nauka. 1972. 202 pages 1100 copies.
- Ethnogenesis and ethnic history of Koreans according to the epigraph ("Stella Gwanggaeto Taewang-Van")., Nauka. 1979. 182 pages 1200 copies.
- Ethnic identity of Koreans in the early feudal era. Abstract. diss., 1986.

Dmitrieva, Valentina (b. 1927)

- Verb voice in contemporary literary Korean language. Abstract. diss. ... Because of Philology. Mb. M., 1964.
- Korean language. Practical course: a training manual. 2 ed. M., MGIMO-University. 2008. 251 p.

== E ==
Eliseev, Dmitry (1926–1994)

- Korean medieval literature phesol. (Some problems of origin and genre). Nauka. 1968. 136 pages 1000 copies. (Same: Authob. PhD thesis. ... Philology. Leningrad, LSU. 1966)
- Korean novels of the Middle Ages: (Evolution of the genre). Nauka. 1977. 256 pages 1550 copies. (Same: Authob. PhD thesis. ... Village Philology. Moscow, 1979)
- Translations:

Korean novels. Ed., Preface. and ca. Dmitry Eliseev. M. AV. 1959. 203 pages 9000 copies.
Чхое Чхун Джон (최충전 崔忠傳 The Story of the righteous Mr Choi). Ed. Dmitry Eliseev. (Series "Museum of Literature of the East". Vyp.18). Nauka. 1971.
Ним чангун джон (?장군전)(?將軍傳) Story of General Nim. Ed. Dmitry Eliseev. (Series "Museum of Literature of the East". Vyp.48). Nauka. 1975. 71 + 56 pages 2000 copies.
Ким Чегук. Kim Chae-guk. Corean Tales Korean short stories. Ed. and comm. Dmitry Eliseev. (A series of "Monuments of the East". Vyp.9) St. Petersburg, Petersburg Oriental Studies. 2004. 599 p.
Лисий перевал: Foxes pass: a collection of Korean stories XV-XIX centuries. Ed. with Cob. and whale. Dmitry Eliseev. (Series "Golden Fund of Korean Literature» I). St. Petersburg, Hyperion. 2008. 315 p.

Eremenko, L. E. (b. 1930)

- Eremenko, LI, Ivanov VI Korean literature. Brief Sketch. (Series "Literature of the East"). Nauka 1964. 156 pages 1400 copies.

Efimov, Andrey V.

- Role and place of Korean shamanism in the social history of Korea: Problems of transformation. Abstract. diss. ... K.. Mb. M., 2003.

== F ==
Fedorov, Alexander

- The role of foreign capital in the industrial development of the Asia-Pacific Region: (on materials of Singapore, Hong Kong, South Korea and Taiwan). Abstract. diss. ... K. Oe. Mb. M., 1987.
- State and big business in foreign economic relations of South Korea. M., IMEMO. 2006. 101 p.
- South Korean chaebol: formation, evolution and transformation. M., IMEMO. 2007. 137 p.
- The evolution of relations between the state and big business in the Republic of Korea. Abstract. diss. ... E. e. Mb. M., 2008.

== G ==
Glukhareva, Olga (1897 -?)

- The Art of Korea from ancient times to the end of the nineteenth century. MM, Art. 1982. 255 pages, Fig. 25000 copies.

Gorely, Igor Olegovich

- Korea. Concept association. M., VL. 1997. 125 p.

Gryaznov, Gennady Vikorovich (b. 1929)

- Socialist industrialization in the DPRK (1945-1960 Gg.). Nauka 1966. 216 pages 2000 copies.
- Building material and technical basis of socialism in the DPRK. Nauka. 1979. 239 pages 1300 copies.

Gushchina, Irina Nikolaevna

- Guschina JH, Lim, VN, Pestushko S. Analysis of the eastern fiction: Based on Japanese and Korean stories. Khabarovsk, Publisher DGGU. 2006. 181 p.

== H ==
Hyun Myong Chul

- Republic of Korea - Russia. Key Trends Economic Cooperation (1992-1996 Gg.). M., Institute of Oriental Studies, RAS. 1998. 101 p.

Ho Kang

- The Spiritual World of the ancient North-East Asia and the cultural content of bronze incense of Baekje. M., Phys. state. Univ Press. 2007. 51 p.

== I ==
Ivanov, Alexander Mikhailovich

- Ivanov, M., Knyazev, SD. The basics of constitutional law on the Korean peninsula. Vladivostok, Far Eastern Publishing House. Univ. 2002. 85 pages
- Ivanov AM, Pavel A. Criminal law and criminal policy on the Korean peninsula (a comparative analysis): a tutorial. Vladivostok, Far Eastern Publishing House. Univ. 2002. 158 p.

Ivanov, Alexander Yuryevich

- Socio-cultural interaction between the two branches of the Far Eastern civilizations - Japan and Korea: 3. BC. E. nach.17-in. BP ... Ph.D. Vladivostok, 2003.

Ivanova, Vikorina Ivanovna (b. 1929)

- A creative way to Lee Ki-Yong (novelist). Abstract. diss. ... Because of Philology. Mb. M. Iv. 1960.
- Lee Ki-Yong (이기영 李箕永, 1895~1984). The life and work. M. AV. 1962. 103 pages 1000 copies.
- New Fiction of Korea. Nauka. 1987. 178 p. 700 copies.

Ionova, V. Yundviga (b. 1924)

- The Korean village in the late nineteenth and early twentieth century. (Historical-ethnographic essay). Abstract. diss. ... K.. Mb. L., 1953.
- Rites, customs, and their social function in Korea. The middle of the nineteenth-early twentieth century. Nauka. 1982. 232 pages 3800 copies.

== K ==
Kazakevich, Igor S. (b. 1920)

- Agrarian Relations in Korea before the Second World War (1930–1939). Dissertation. diss. ... K. Oe. Mb. M., 1956.
- Agrarian Relations in Korea on the eve of the Second World Wab. M. AV. 1958. 127 pages 1700 copies.
- The Agrarian Question in South Korea. Nauka. 1964. 159 pages 1100 copies.
- Agrarian Relations in South Korea, 1945–1976. Nauka. 1980. 196 p. 900 copies.

Kholodovich, Alexander Alekseevich (1906–1977)

- transcription for Korean into Cyrillic.

Kim, Alexander Alekseevich (b. 1976)

- History of Bohai State: based on studies of South Korean scholars. Abstract. diss. ... K.. Mb. Vladivostok, 2007. ( in Russian)
- Historiography of Bohai in Russia, in: The Historian. Summer 2011. vol. 73. Issue 2. pp. 284– 299.(in English)
- Relations between Bohai and Silla from the seventh to the ninth century: a critical analysis in: Acta Orientalia. 2011. vol. 64 (3), pp. 345–356. (in English)
- On the origin of the Jurchen People (a study based on Russian Sources), in: Central Asiatic Journal. 55 (2011) 2. pp. 165–176. (in English)
- Repressions of Soviet Koreans at 1930s, in: The Historian. Summer 2012. vol. 74. Issue 2. pp. 267 – 285. (in English)
- Bohajról szóló észak-koreai tanulmányok (Bohai studies in North Korea). (transl. by Fodor Mihalyne), in: Klio. 2010/3. pp. 64–74. (in Hungarian)

Kim, Vladimir Aleksandrovich

- The role of the people's democratic state and law in the socialist transformation of agriculture. (The experience of the Democratic People's Republic of Korea). Alma-Ata, Kazakh SSR Academy of Sciences Publishing House. 1962. 312 pages 2050 copies.

Kim, Georgii Fyodorivich (1924–1989)

- Assistance of the Soviet Union in economic and cultural development of the Democratic People's Republic of Korea (1945–1950). Abstract. diss. ... K.. Mb. M., 1952.
- Korean people's struggle for peace, national unity and democracy. M., Gospolitizdat. 1957. 160, p. 20000 copies.
- The working class of the new Korea. M., Profizdat. 1960. 111 pages 2000 copies.
- Berkov EA, Kim GF collapse of the colonial system of imperialism. M., Graduate School. 1962. 88 pages 12000 copies.
- The working class of Korea in the revolutionary movement and the socialist construction. Nauka. 1965. 479 pages (CPD)
- Kim GF, Shabshina FI: Proletarian internationalism and revolution in the East. Nauka. 1967. 399 pages 2200 copies.
- Kim GF, Kaufman A. Leninism and the national liberation movement. M., Politizdat. 1969. 288, p. 50000 copies.
- Huber, A., Kim, GF, Heifets N. A New History of Asia and Africa: A Textbook for the East. Nauka 1975. 543, p. 40000 copies. 3rd ed. M., 1982.
- Kim GF, Shabshina FI alliance of the working class and the peasantry and the experience of socialist countries in Asia: (For example, Mongolia, North Korea, North Vietnam). Nauka 1977. 307 pages 2500 copies.
- From national liberation to the social: Socio-political aspects of modern national liberation movement. Nauka 1982. 296 pages 3200 copies. 2 ed. Nauka. 1986. 342 pages 3000 copies.

Kim Yong-Su

- History of Korean-Russian relations in the late nineteenth century. Moscow, MAKS Press. 2006. 100 pages

Kovalchuk, Marina K.

- Evolution of Japanese expansionism in Korea in the 60s-90s. Nineteenth century. Vladivostok, Far Eastern Publishing House. Univ. 2005. 247 p.

Kovalchuk, Julia S.

- Korean Protestantism and its missionary practices in the Asian part of Russia. Novosibirsk, Publishing House of IAE SB RAS. 2008. 191 pages (the same: Authob. Thesis. ... K.. N. Novosibirsk, 2006)

Kontsevich, Lev Rafailovich (b. 1930)

- Originator of the Kontsevich system for transliteration of Korean into Cyrillic. (Система Концевича) on the basis of the earlier transcription of A. A. Kholodovich.

Kravtsov, Ivan

- U.S. imperialist aggression in Korea 1945–1951. M., Gospolitizdat. 1951. 440, p. 80,000 copies.

Kruglov, E V

- Пресса Южной Кореи. The Press in South Korea. M., ICAb. 2005. 227 p.

Kurbanov, Sergey Olegovich

- Historiographical aspects of land relations in Korea X-XIV centuries, based on "Drawing the history of Korea." Abstract. diss. ... K.. Mb. St. Petersburg, 1992.
- The course of lectures on Korean history from ancient times until the end of the twentieth century. St. Petersburg, St. Petersburg State University Publishing House. 2002. 625 pages 1000 copies. (2nd ed.: History of Korea from ancient times to the beginning of the 21st century. St. Petersburg, St. Petersburg State University Publishing House. 2009. 678 pages)
- Korean Confucian monuments of writing about the universal category of filial piety: twelfth century to the beginning of the twentieth century. Abstract. diss. ... On and. Mb. St. Petersburg, 2005.
- The scholarly classic "The Book of filial piety" in the Korean interpretation: the Korean perception of the universal category of "piety". St. Petersburg, St. Petersburg State University Publishing House. 2007. 279 p.

Kuehner, Nikolai

- Statistical and geographical and economic outline of Korea, now the Japanese Government-General territory of "Chosen". Issue 1. Vladivostok, 1912.

== L ==
Lazareva, Larisa

- Lazareva, LP, Lee Muen Zin. The role of the pedagogical potential of song and literary arts in the democratization of South Korean society. Khabarovsk, Publisher DVGUPS. 2006. 103 pages

Lankov, Andrei Nikolaevich (b. 1963)

Lee, Valentin Nikolaevich

- Korean literature. / / History of World Literature. Vol.6. M., 1989. S.622-624. Vol.7. M., 1991. S.684-685. V.8. M., 1994. S.613-616.

Lee, Vladimir Fedorovich (Lee Hyo Y) (b. 1930), work on South Asia

- Russia and Korea in the geopolitics of the Eurasian East (Twentieth century). M., Science. 2000. 516 p.

Lee Shin Wook

- Russian-South Korean political relations (the end of the 20th - beginning of the 21st century). M., TEIS. 2005. 119 pages

== M ==
Mazur, Yuri (1924–1998)

- Cases and postpositions in Korean language. Abstract. diss. ... Because of Philology. Mb. M., 1953.
- Korean language. M. AV. 1960. 118 pages 1500 copies.
- Disposing of the Korean language. Moscow, Publishing Phys. Univ. 1962. 116 pages 1000 copies.
- Summary of Korean-Russian dictionary. 25000 words., Comp. N. Mazur, VM Mozdykov, DM Usatov. M., GIS. 1962. 614 pages 6000 copies.

Mazur, N., Nicholas LB Russian-Korean dictionary: Approximately 40,000 words. Moscow, Russian language. 1988. 501, p. 19000 copies.

Mazurov, Viktor Mikhailovich (b. 1929)

- Anti-Japanese armed struggle of the Korean People (1931–1940). M. AV. 1958. 104 pages 1500 copies.
- Creation of the anti-popular regime in South Korea. (1945–1950 years). M. AV. 1963. 195 pages 1200 copies.
- Mazurov VM, Sinitsyn BV, South Korea. Dramatic crossroads. M. AV. 1963. 152 pages 3800 copies.
- South Korea and the U.S. (1950–1970). Wiley, New York. 1971. 268 pages 2400 copies.
- U.S. - China-Japan: the restructuring of international relations (1969–1979). Wiley, New York. 1980. 214 pages 7600 copies.
- From authoritarianism to democracy (the practice of South Korea and the Philippines). MA, Eastern literature. 1996. 197 p. 500 copies.

Markov, Valery M. (b. 1947)

- Republic of Korea: Tradition and Modernity in the culture of the second half of the twentieth century. View from Russia. Vladivostok, Far Eastern Publishing House. Univ. 1999. 445 pages
- The Art of the Republic of Korea the second half of the twentieth century. Abstract. diss. ... Village of arts. M., 2003.

Martynov, Viktor

- Korea. Economic and geographic characteristics of the DPRK and South Korea. M., Thought. 1970. 215 pages 5500 copies.

== N ==
Nam, Svetlana (b. 1932)

- The formation of the intelligentsia in the DPRK (1945–1962 years).. Nauka. 1970. 111 pages 1400 copies.
- Education and Science of the DPRK in terms of scientific and technological revolution. Nauka. 1975. 77, p. 2300 copies.
- Russian Koreans: History and Culture (1860–1925 years).. M. Iv. 1998. 188 p. 250 copies.

Nikitina, Marianna Ivanovna (1930–1999)

- Korean medieval poetry in the genres of Sijo and back-Sijo. Abstract. diss. ... Because of Philology. Mb. L., 1962.
- Sanchon kibon (Ссянъчхон кыйбонъ) (The amazing connection of two bracelets). (Series "Historical Literature of the East. Texts. Small Series". Vyp.15). Ed. M. Nikitina, AF Trotsevich. M. AV. 1962. 78 + 124 pp 1250 ind.
- Nikitin MI, Trotsevich A.F. History of Korean literature to the fourteenth century., Nauka. 1969. 238 pages 1200 copies.
- Nikitin MI, Trotsevich AF Korean Literature. History of World Literature. V.2. M., 1984. S.148-154. Vol.3. M., 1985. S.649-654. Volume 4. M., 1987. S.504-512. V.5. M., 1988. S.603-619.
- Ancient Korean poetry in connection with the ritual and myth. (Series "Studies in Folklore and mythology of the East"). Nauka, Moscow (GRVL). 1982. 328 pages 4600 copies. (The same: diss. ... / In the village. N. Leningrad, Leningrad 1981.)
- Korean poetry XVI-XIX centuries. the genre Sijo: Semantic structure of the genre. Image. Space. Time. (Series «Orientalia») St. Petersburg, Petersburg Oriental Studies. 1994. 306 pages 1000 copies.
- The myth of woman-Sun and her parents and his companions in the ritual traditions of ancient Korea and neighboring countries. (Series "Myths, epics, religions of the East. Bibliotheca Universalia»). Petersburg, Petersburg Oriental Studies. 2001. 560 pages

Nicholas, Leonid Borisovich (b. 1924)

- On the "nepolnoznachnyh nouns" in modern Korean. К вопросу о «неполнозначных именах существительных» в современном корейском языке. Abstract. diss. ... Because of Philology. Mb. M., 1953.
- Auxiliary words in Korean. M. AV. 1962. 180 pages 1000 copies.
- Korean-Russian military dictionary. About 20000 terms. Ed. LB Nikolsky. M., Voyenizdat. 1966. 281 pages 1500 copies.
- Essays on the Theory of sociolinguistics. Abstract. diss. ... Village of Philology. Mb. L., 1975.
- Synchronous sociolinguistics: (Theory and problems). Wiley, New York. 1976. 168 pages 2950 copies.
- Large Korean-Russian dictionary. In 2 v. Approximately 150,000 words. Ed. LB Nikolsky, and Choi Dan Hu. Moscow, Russian language. 1976. 7000 copies. V.1. 811 p.
- Language in the policy and ideology of the East. Nauka. 1986. 194 pages 1050 copies.

== O ==
Okrut, Zoya Mikhailovna; economist

- Okrut ZM, Pam JaMin. The model of economic development in South Korea. The path to prosperity. MA, Finance and Statistics. 1992. 95, p. 2500 copies.

== P ==
Pak, Boris Dmitrievich (b. 1931)

- The liberation struggle of the Korean people on the eve of the First World Wab. Nauka. 1967. 167 pages 1600 copies. (Same: Authob. PhD thesis. ... K.. N. Moscow, 1965)
- Russia and Korea in the middle of the XIX-early XX centuries. Abstract. diss. ... On and. Mb., 1974.
- Russia and Korea. (Series "The USSR and the countries of the East"). Nauka. 1979. 303 pages 1300 copies.
- The Koreans in the Russian Empire. 2 ed. Irkutsk, 1994. 236 pages 1000 copies.
- Koreans in Soviet Russia (1917-end 30-ies). Moscow, Irkutsk, 1995. 258 pages 1000 copies.
- The March First Movement in Korea in 1919 Through the eyes of the Russian diplomat., Comp. BD Park, Pak Thegyn. AM-Irkutsk, 1998. 179 p. 150 copies.
- Retribution at the Harbin Station: The documentary-historical essay on Ahn Jung-geun. AM-Irkutsk, the first of March. 1999. 157 p. 275 copies.
- Russia and Korea. 2 ed. M., Institute of Oriental Studies, RAS. 2004. 519 p.
- The USSR, the Comintern and the Korean liberation movement: 1918-1925: essays, documents, materials. M., Institute of Oriental Studies, RAS. 2006. 415 p.

Pak, Bella Borisovna

- Russian diplomacy and Korea 1860–1888. M., 1998 -. Kn. 1. 1998. 244 pages
- Russian diplomacy and Korea 1888–1897. M., 2004 -. Kn. 2. 2004. 270 pages
- Russian diplomacy and Korea 1876–1898. Abstract. diss. ... On and. Mb. M., 2007.
- The First Proceedings about Korea in Russia. Moscow, Institute of Oriental Studies RAS, 2010. Coed. with B.D.Pak and Yu.V.Vanin. 357 pages.
- Alexandra Petrovna Kim-Stankevich. Biographical Materials and Documents. Moscow, Institute of Oriental Studies RAS, 2008. Coed. with B.D.Pak and Yu.V.Vanin. 240 pages.
- Koreans in the USSb. Moscow, Institute of Oriental Studies RAS, 2004. Coed. with B.D.Pak and Yu.V.Vanin. 344 pages.
- The March First Movement of 1919: New approaches. // The March First Movement of 1919: New look. Moscow, 1999. P.105-115. Ed.
- Catalogue of Documents of the Russian State Historical Archives on Korean History and History of Russo- Korean relations. The latter half of the nineteenth and the early twentieth century. М., Vostochnaya literatura, 2010. Vol.1. Ed., foreword and comments. 256 pages.

Pak, Vadim Pavlovich

- Korean folk tales. (Experience in the study of national identity at the end of publications nineteenth to twentieth centuries the middle.). Abstract. diss. ... Philology. Mb. M., 1970.
- The educational movement and the education system in Korea from the second half of the nineteenth - beginning of the twentieth century. Nauka. 1982. 115 pages 1000 copies.

Pak, Valentin Petrovich

- They fought for the independence of Korea: essays, memoirs, articles. Vladivostok, Dalpress. 2005. 415 p.

Pak, Mikhail Nikolayevich (1918–2009)

- Outlines of the early history of Korea. Moscow, Moscow State University Press. 1979. 239 pages 1180 copies.
- Essays on the Historiography of Korea (Critique of the bourgeois-nationalist ideas of South Korean historians). Wiley, New York. 1987. 146 p. 850 copies.
- History and Historiography of Korea: Selected Works. M., VL. 2003. 911 p.
- Translation of Volume 1 (1959) and Volume 2 (1995) SGSG.

Pak Choong Ho

- Russia and Korea, 1895–1898. MA, CIP; MSU. 1993. 181 p.
- Russian-Japanese war of 1904–1905. and Korea. MA, Eastern literature. 1997. 277 p.

Petrov, Leonid, Lecturer in Korean Studies at The University of Sydney.

Petrova, Olga Petrovna (1900–1993), also Japanologist

- Description of the written monuments of Korean culture. Issue 1. Leningrad, Acad Sci. 1956. 32 pages 1700 copies. Issue 2. M. AV. 1963. 138 p. 800 copies.

Pigulevskaya, Evgenia, Japanologist

- Korean people in their struggle for independence and democracy. MA, Publishing Sciences. 1952. 10000 copies.

Pisarev, Larissa

- Modern Korean Literature: The second half of the twentieth century. Ed. L. Pisarev and Kim Hyun Theka. Moscow, Academy of Sciences Institute of World Literature. 2004. 188 pages

Piskulova, Julia E.

- Russian-Korean relations in the middle of the 19th - early 20th centuries. MA, Eastern literature. 2004. 150 pages

Polekhin, Andrew S.

- Korea-US trade relations (seb.20 nach.21-in.). M., TEIS. 2003. 166 p.
- Trade relations of the Republic of Korea and the U.S. in the second half of the 20th - beginning of the 21st century. Abstract. diss. ... K. Oe. Mb. M., 2004.

Proshin, Alexey A.

- Socio-economic changes in South Korea in the years 1961–1978. (A description of the role of neo-colonialism and internal factors). Abstract. diss., MGU. 1979.
- Proshin AA, Timonin A.A. U.S. Neocolonialism and South Korea. Nauka. 1985. 190 pages 1100 copies.

== R ==
Rachkov, Gennady E. (b. 1929), translator

- Category of the verb in modern Korean. Abstract. diss. ... Because of Philology. Mb. L., 1963.

Rosalia, Yuri (b. 1922), economist, historian of Turkey

- From the history of Russian-Korean relations. M., VL. 1998. 79 pages

Rue Hakki (Yuriko JC)

- Japanese historiography on the history of Korea's early period. Abstract. diss. ... K.. Mb. M., 1969.
- Problems of the early history of Korea in Japanese historiography. Wiley, New York. 1975. 200 pages 1100 copies.

== S ==
Shabshina, Fanya Isaakovna (1906-after 1992)

- The popular uprising in 1919 in Korea. MA, Publishing Sciences. 1952. 280 pages 5000 copies. 2 ed. M. AV. 1958. 213 pages 3000 copies.
- Essays on the modern history of Korea (1945–1953 years).. M., Gospolitizdat. 1958. 307, p. 10000 copies.
- Essays on the modern history of Korea (1918–1945 years).. M. AV. 1959. 276 pages 2100 copies.
- "At the speed of the Chollima". In the new Korea. M., Gospolitizdat. 1960. 87, p. 20000 copies.
- The Socialist Korea (On the forms of expression in the DPRK of the general laws of socialist construction). M. AV. 1963. 199 pages 1600 copies.
- South Korea. 1945–1946. Notes of an eyewitness. Nauka. 1974. 272 pages 6400 copies.
- History of the Korean Communist Movement (1918–1945). Wiley, New York. 1988. 299 p. 250 copies. (CPD)
- In colonial Korea (1940–1945). Notes and reflections of the eyewitness. Nauka. 1992. 287 p. 500 copies.

Shin, Vladimir A. (b. 1968)

- China and the Korean State in the second half of the twentieth century. M., MGU. 1998. 181 pages 500 copies.

Shipan, Viktor Ivanovich (b. 1928)

- The national liberation struggle of the Korean people against Japanese imperialism (1918–1931 years).. Abstract diss. Ph.D. ... M., 1954.
- The colonial subjugation of Korea by Japanese imperialism. (1895–1917). Nauka. 1964. 242 p. 900 copies.
- The Korean bourgeoisie in the national liberation movement. Nauka. 1966. 299 pages 1300 copies.
- Japan and South Korea. ("Development aid" and its consequences). Nauka. 1981. 287 pages 1750 copies.
- South Korea in the world capitalist system. Wiley, New York. 1986. 287 pages 1050

Simbirtseva, Tatiana

- Korea at the crossroads of epochs. - M.: Ant-Hyde, 2000. - 256 pp. (Most geography).
- Republic of Korea. Pocket Encyclopedia. - M.: Ant-Hyde, 2000. - 512 pp. (Together with SV Volkov).
- Ans. Ed.: Chirkin S.V. Twenty years of service in the East. Notes royal diplomat. - M.: Rus. word 2006. - 368 pp., Il. (Together with SV Volkov)
- Compl.: Bibliography and Dictionary of Contemporary Russian koreevedov / Contemporary Russian Korean Studies. Reference book. MM: First of March, 2006. S. 129–622. (Russian Korean Studies in the past and present. T. 3.)

Sinitsyn, Boris Vladimirovich (b. 1929)

- The industry and the working class in South Korea 1945–1959. M. AV. 1961. 152 pages 1800 copies.
- Essays on the economy of South Korea (1953–1964). Nauka 1967. 172 pages 1700 copies.

Soldatov, Maria

- National prose in Korea in the first quarter of the twentieth century. Vladivostok, Far Eastern Publishing House. Univ. 2004. 186 pages (the same: Authob. Thesis. Philology. Mb. Vladivostok, 2004)

Soloviev, Alexander V.

Subbotina, Anastasia L.

- Monuments of the Early Iron Age type Chundu on the Korean peninsula. Abstract. diss. ... K.. Mb. Novosibirsk, 2008.

Souslin, Svetlana Serafimovna

- The expansion of foreign capital in the industry in South Korea. Wiley, New York. 1979. 168 pages 1000 copies. (Same: Authob. PhD thesis. ... K. Oe. Mb.. Moscow, 1977)
- Industry of South Korea (Economic development and social consequences). Wiley, New York. 1988. 215, p. 950 ind.
- Republic of Korea at the post-industrial stage of development (late 1980s - early 1990s.). MA, Eastern literature. 1997. 222 p. 500 copies.
- Economy of the Republic of Korea in the light of globalization. M., IDV RAN. 2002. 193 pages
- Transformation of the economic model of the Republic of Korea in the context of globalization and regionalization of the world market. Abstract. diss. ... E. e. Mb. M., IFAP. 2002.

== T ==
Tikhonov, Vladimir Mikhailovich (b. 1973)

- History kayaskih protogosudarstv (pm V in 562 .-). MA, Eastern literature. 1998. 252 p.
- History of Korea: (Uch.posobie). From ancient times until 1876. V.1. M. Ant. 2003.

Tkachenko, Vadim P. (b. 1932)

- Security in Korea and the interests of Russia (1961–1995 years).. Abstract. diss. ... K.. Mb. M., 1997.
- The Korean Peninsula and Russia's interests. M., 2000.

Toloraya, George Davidovich (b. 1956)

- The formation of the national economy of the DPRK and its participation in the international division of labob. Abstract. diss. ... K. Oe. Mb. M., 1983.
- The national economic complex of the DPRK. M., IEMSS. 1984. 167 p. 50 copies. (CPD)
- Large IG, Toloraya GD Democratic People's Republic. M., Thought. 1987. 130, p. 60000 copies.
- Republic of Korea. M., Thought. 1991. 118, p. 50000 copies.
- Problems of becoming South Korea's economic model and its transformation on the threshold of the 21st century. Abstract. diss. ... E. e. Mb. M., 1993.

Tolstokulakov, Igor (b. 1963)

- History of Korean culture. Vladivostok, Far Eastern State University. 2002. 238 pages
- Pak Hisui, Tolstokulakov IA Education in the socio-political system of the Korean peninsula. Vladivostok, Far Eastern Publishing House. Univ. 2005. 253 p.
- The history of political thought of Korea. Vladivostok, Far Eastern Publishing House. Univ. 2007. 366 pages

Torkunov, Anatoly Vasilyevich, rector of Moscow State Institute of International Relations since 1992.

Trigubenko, Marina E. (b. 1933)

- The socialist transformation of agriculture in the Democratic People's Republic of Korea. Abstract. diss. ... K. Oe. Mb. M., 1963.
- Agriculture in the DPRK. The path of socialist development. Nauka. 1973. 136 pages 1300 copies.
- Trigubenko M.E., Denisov V., Marinov, VA, and other industry of the Democratic People's Republic of Korea: Economic Foundations, the current level and structure. Nauka. 1977. 180 pages 1900 copies.
- Asian "syndrome" of socialism. Nauka. 1991. 126 p. 700 copies.
- Trigubenko ME, Toloraya GD Essays on Economics of the Republic of Korea. Nauka - Eastern literature. 1993. 152 p. 500 copies.

Trotsevich, Adelaide F. (b. 1930)

- "Legend of Chun Hyang" and stories in the Korean medieval literature. Abstract. diss. Philology. Mb. L., 1962.
- Korean medieval tales. Nauka. 1975. 264 pages 1300 copies.
- Korean medieval romances. Abstract. diss. Philology. Mb. L., 1983.
- Korean medieval novel "The Cloud Dream of the Nine", (Kuunmong), by KimManchoo. Nauka 1986. 198 pages 1200 copies.
- "Fight of the Storm God with the Serpent" in Korean culture. St. Petersburg Oriental Studies. St. Petersburg, 1993. Vol.3.
- Myth and story prose Korea. (Series "Myths, epics, religions of the East: Bibliotheca universalia») St. Petersburg, Petersburg Oriental Studies. 1996. 184 p. 500 copies.
- History of Korean traditional literature (up to the twentieth century.): Textbook. St. Petersburg, St. Petersburg State University Publishing House. 2004. 323 p.
- Trotsevich AF, Gurieva A. Description of the written monuments of Korean traditional culture. Vol. 1. Korean written records in the fund of Chinese xylographers east of the Scientific Library of St. Petersburg State University. St. Petersburg, St. Petersburg State University Publishing House. 2007. 300 pages
- Translations:

ChunHyang-jeon (춘향전) Kwon Jitan (Краткая повесть о Чхунхян). Ed. AF Trotsevich. (Series "Museum of Literature of the East". Vyp.19). Wiley, New York. 1968. 96 + 64 pages 850 copies.
Чек Сеный Чен (??전). (Tale of Chek Senye. In one notebook). Ed. and comm. AF Trotsevich. (A series of "Monuments of the East". Vol.3) St. Petersburg, Petersburg Oriental Studies. 1996. 232 pages

Tan, Anna Nikolaevna (1919–2000)

- Essays on modern Korean literature (democratic national traditions and socialist realism in Korean literature.) Abstract. diss. ... Because of Philology. Mb. L., 1954.
- Korean classical literature and the problem of realism. Abstract. diss. ... Village of Philology. Mb. Moscow, 1971)
- The traditions of realism in the Korean classical literature. Alma-Ata, Nauka. 1980. 303 pages 1600 copies. (Same: Authob. PhD thesis. ... Village Philology. Mb. Alma-Ata, 1984)
- Essays on Korean literature. The twentieth century (before 1945). Seoul, Central Asian association for Korean studies. 2003. 460 p.

Tyagai, Galina Davydovna (b. 1922)

- Korea in 1893–1896. (Peasant uprising and the struggle of the Korean people against the Japanese militarists and their American supporters). Abstract. diss. ... K.. M. M., 1951.
- The peasant uprising in Korea 1893–1895. MA, Publishing Sciences. 1953. 208 pages 3000 copies.
- The people's movement in Korea in the second half of the nineteenth century. M. AV. 1958. 78 p. 3000 copies.
- Essay on the history of Korea in the second half of the nineteenth century. M. AV. 1960. 239 pages 1500 copies.
- Public thought Korea in the era of late feudalism. Nauka 1971. 256 pages 1200 copies.
- The formation of the ideology of national liberation movement in Korea. Nauka. 1983. 248 pages 1100 copies.
- The formation of the ideology of national liberation movement in Korea: (early stage). Abstract. diss. ... On and. Mb. M., 1985.
- Tyagai G.D., Pak V.P. National idea and enlightenment in Korea in the early twentieth century. MA, Eastern literature. 1996. 229 p. 500 copies.

Tian, Valery (Chon Hyunkee)

- Architecture Buddhist temples, medieval Korea. Abstract. diss. ... K. arch. M., 1992.
- Buddhist Temples in Medieval Korea: History. Architecture. Philosophy. (Series "The Culture of the East. Materials and Research"). MA, Eastern literature. 2001. 170 pages

== U ==
Usova, Ludmila

- The American historiography of the Korean communist movement 1918–1945. Abstract. diss. 1991.
- The Korean Communist Movement 1918–1945 years. American historiography and documents of the Comintern. M., 1997.

== V ==
Vanin, Yuri (b. 1930)

- Feudal Korea in the thirteenth and fourteenth centuries. M. AV. 1962. 198 pages 1200 copies.
- Economic development of Korea in the seventeenth and eighteenth centuries. Nauka, Moscow. 1968. 285 pages 1300 copies.
- Agrarian system of feudal Korea in the fifteenth and sixteenth centuries. Nauka, Moscow. 1981. 310 p. 950 copies.
- With Jung Sook Bae, V. Vanin, Choong-Ho, MN Khan. Lectures on the history of Korea. M., Exlibris Press. 1997. 96 p.

Voitsekhovski, Andrei Vladimirovich

- Problems and Prospects of Foreign Economic Relations of Russia with the countries of the Korean peninsula. M., Sputnik. 2002. 178 pages (the same: diss. ... K. Oe. N. Moscow, 2003)

Volkov, Sergey Vladimirovich (b. 1955)

Vorobyev, Mikhail Vasilyevich

Vorontsov, Alexander Valentinovich.

- The Republic of Korea: the socio-economic structure, trade and economic relations with the CIS. M., Institute of Oriental Studies, RAS. 1998. 99 p.

Vorontsov, Vladilen B. (b. 1930), also sinologist and Americanist

- Korea in U.S. plans during the Second World Wab. M. AV. 1962. 140 pages 1500 copies. (Same: Authob. PhD thesis. ... K.. N. MA, 1961)

== Z ==
Zhdanova, Larisa

- Poetical works of Ch'oe Ch'iwon. St. Petersburg, 1998. (Same: Authob. PhD thesis. ... Philology. Leningrad, LSU. 1983)

Zabrovskaya, Larisa V.

- Sino-Korean relations since the last quarter of the nineteenth century. before 1910 Cand. diss. ... K.. Mb., 1978.
- The policy of the Qing dynasty in Korea. 1876-1910 Nauka. 1987. 131 pages 1250 copies.
- Historiographical problems of the Sino-Japanese War of 1894–1895. Vladivostok, BI 1993. 124 pages 1000 copies.
- The Chinese world order in East Asia and the formation of inter-state boundaries: (For example, the Sino-Korean relations from the seventeenth to twentieth centuries).. Vladivostok, Far Eastern Publishing House. Univ. 2000. 89 p.

The above list is a translation from Russian Wikipedia.
