= This Is Paradise! =

Autobiography by Hyok Kang

This is Paradise!: My North Korean Childhood
- First edition (French) (publ. Michel Lafon Publishing)
- Author: Hyok Kang with Philippe Grangereau
- Translator: Shaun Whiteside (English)
- Genre: Memoir
- Publisher: Little, Brown/Abacus
- Publication date: 2004 (France); 2005 (Britain); July 5, 2007 (United States)
- Media type: Print (Hardcover and paperback)
- Pages: 204
- ISBN: 978-0-349-11865-9

This is Paradise!: My North Korean Childhood is the autobiographical account of Hyok Kang, who describes his childhood in Onsong, North Korea, in the 1980s and 1990s, his escape into China in 1998, his journey through southeast Asia, and his life in South Korea.

The book was originally published in France in 2004, with the title Ici, C'est Le Paradis!: Une enfance en Coree du Nord.

== See also ==
- Human rights in North Korea
- North Korean literature
