= Friend (Paek novel) =

1988 novel by Paek Nam-nyong

Friend: A Novel from North Korea (Korean: 벗) is a 1988 novel by Paek Nam-nyong. It is one of the few non-dissident North Korean works to be translated into English, with Columbia University Press releasing its translation in 2020. Immanuel Kim was the translator. The book has 16 chapters. E. Tammy Kim of The New York Times wrote that "autobiographical" elements are in the work.

Nicholas Gattig in the Japan Times wrote that as the work was published in North Korea, it does not have secret subversion.

== Plot ==
The book's plot is about a judge named Jeong Jin-wu, who manages divorces. The judge examines the life of a woman, Chae Sun-hee, who is asking for a divorce from Lee Seok-chun, her husband. Sun-hee sings while Seok-chun produces steel in a factory. The judge learns more about the situation and intends to do his best to keep the marriage intact. E. Tammy Kim wrote that "The judge’s interventions feel creepy at times, even by the standards of the world of the book." The novel outlines how the couple courted, and Eric Nguyen of the Minneapolis Star-Tribune stated that the novel portrays characters as "complex beings".

== Background ==
Immanuel Kim, intending to translate a North Korean novel, looked through thousands of works before choosing Friend.

== Release ==
The first South Korean edition was published in 1992. In 2011 it was published in French. The English translation, done by Columbia University Press, was published in 2020.

== Adaptations ==
There was a television series in North Korea based on this work. In South Korea a group that intended to have cultural exchange with North Korea made a theatre version.

== Reception ==
Esther Kim, in The Guardian, wrote that in North Korea it became a "best-seller". She stated that it "illuminates the personal rather than the political".

E. Tammy Kim wrote that the work hints at aspects considered embarrassing to the North Korean state despite the "at times, didactic and propagandistic" style.

Kirkus Reviews concluded that the work has "A rare glimpse into an insular world."

Eric Nguyen stated that "psychological acuity" is a "surprise" of the novel.

Gattig described the author as "An expert at storytelling and craft".

Barbara Hoffert, Terry Hong, Lawrence Olszewski of the Library Journal selected the translation of Friend as en entry in "Best World Literature of 2020", citing how it has "a rare glimpse into everyday life" in North Korea.

The book was classified as seditious by South Korea's Ministry of National Defense, which banned military personnel from reading it.

== See also ==
- North Korean literature
