= Yi Kŭmch'ŏl =

North Korean writer

- Occupation: Author
- Known for: Korean science fiction
- Notable work: The Oil Field's Black Fog (2000); Red Flash (2002); Change Course! (2004)

Korean name
- Hangul: 리금철
- RR: Ri Geumcheol
- MR: Ri Kŭmch'ŏl

Yi Kŭmch'ŏl (Korean: 리금철) is a North Korean writer known for writing spy fiction, science fiction, and technothriller novels. A prominent figure in Korean science fiction, Yi is one of the most prolific science fiction writers in North Korea. By the 2010s, he had written about 20 science fiction stories, accounting for about one-fifth of all North Korean science fiction literature. According to The Encyclopedia of Science Fiction, Yi's "distinctive fusion of Cold War technothriller, espionage narrative, and futuristic spectacle has defined the genre's contemporary form" in North Korea. He also writes children's literature in the North Korean Children's Literature (아동문학) magazine.

== Writing style ==
Yi is credited with introducing innovative tropes and plot elements into North Korean science fiction. He has been noted for his use of eroticism, suspense, and mysterious conspiracies in his stories. Prior to his works, these tropes were unused in North Korean literature. His stories feature strong anti-Western and North Korean nationalist rhetoric, with antagonists typically being from the United States, South Korea, or Japan. Yi's novels are often set outside of North Korea and feature foreign characters, allowing for depictions of romance different from typical North Korean depictions. In his story Red Flash (붉은 섬광), which takes place on a Pacific island, the protagonists engage in romance without regard for political or ideological considerations. Yi makes use of ideas and vocabulary borrowed from foreign fiction. For example, much of the vocabulary in Red Flash originates in Japanese detective stories, and he uses the English loanword "romance" in the story to emphasize the unusual nature of the relationship between the protagonists to North Korean readers.

Yi's stories make use of mysterious villains. His spy thrillers imply various figures such as foreign spies, criminal gangs, and corporations in international conspiracies. He also casts suspicions on both foreign and North Korean characters, undermining traditional North Korean views on good and evil being connected to the domestic and foreign respectively. This method of casting doubt on established ideas works to create a sense of alienation in the reader. The true driving force of most conspiracies in Yi's works is usually American imperialism. Themes in Yi's work focus on real anxieties present in North Korean culture such as concerns about the nation's economic isolation and fear of foreign imperialism. However, science is often presented as a form of catharsis to these anxieties and a source of national pride. For example, in his story Change Course! (항로를 바꾸라), a futuristic anti-gravity ray serves as a deus ex machina to save the protagonists from an American terrorist attack.
