= William George Aston =

British diplomat and scholar (1841–1911)

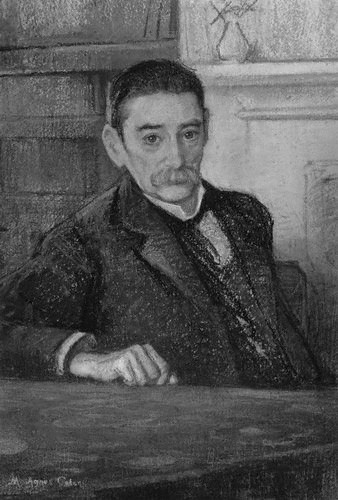
- William George Aston, 1911
- Born: 9 April 1841; Derry, Ireland
- Died: 22 November 1911 (aged 70); Beer, Devon, England
- Occupations: diplomat, educator

William George Aston CMG (9 April 1841 – 22 November 1911) was an Anglo-Irish diplomat, author, and scholar of the languages and histories of Korea and Japan.

== Early life ==
Aston was born near Derry, Ireland. He distinguished himself at Queen's College, Belfast (now Queen's University Belfast), which he attended 1859–1863. There he received a very thorough philological training in Latin, Greek, French, German and modern history. One of his professors was James McCosh.

== Career ==
Aston was appointed student interpreter to the British Legation in Japan on 16 August 1864, after passing a competitive examination and obtaining an honorary certificate on 10 August. He mastered the theory of the Japanese verb, and in Edo began, with Ernest Mason Satow, those profound researches into the Japanese language which laid the foundations of the critical study of the Japanese language by western scholars. Aston served in the British consular service in Tokyo, Kobe and Nagasaki.

From 1884 to 1885, Aston served as the United Kingdom's consul-general in Korea. He returned to consular duties in Tokyo as Secretary of British Legation in 1885. Aston retired from the foreign service on a pension in 1889 because of ill-health and settled in England. He was appointed CMG in the 1889 Birthday Honours.

=== Japan ===
Aston made a major contribution to the fledgling study of Japan's language and history in the 19th century. Along with Ernest Mason Satow and Basil Hall Chamberlain, he was one of three major British Japanologists active in Japan during the 19th century.

Aston was the first translator of the Nihongi into the English language (1896). Other publications were two Japanese grammars (1868 and 1872) and A History of Japanese Literature (1899). He lectured to the Asiatic Society of Japan several times, and many of his papers are published in their Transactions.

In 1912 Cambridge University Library acquired 10,000 rare Japanese volumes from the collections of Aston and Satow which formed the starting point of the Library's Japanese collection.

Okamoto Kidō recalls in chapter eleven on the development and adaption of drama of his book, 明治劇談ランプの下にて, Meiji Gekidan Ranpu no Shitanite (On the Theatre of the Meiji Period - Under the Lamp) (in English) meeting Aston at the British Legation...

Inevitably, I made up my mind to read the scripts of a foreign country. Around that time I went to the British Embassy, which was then still known as the Legation, and imposed myself on the Secretary Mr. (William George) Aston in his room. I was at the time occasionally babysitting Mr. Aston’s children. He had considerable understanding of Japanese literature. However Mr. Aston had brought into the Legation with him the scripts of various foreign plays. He had brought the complete works of Shakespeare though I doubted even though they were there that I would read them. So Mr. Aston, knowing the scripts of the various plays gave me readings, after all it was just the summary that I simply wanted to hear and as a consequence, based on that, I didn’t really end up appreciating the technique of playwriting.

But that I didn’t appreciate the techniques of playwriting from just listening it was certainly kind of him and I certainly often went to his room to listen to and discuss drama. The following summer, July if I remember correctly, I went as usual to visit him when Mr. Aston, laughing, said 'similarly you don’t know about this person’s publications' and showed me five books containing six volumes in temporary bindings which had been published. They, the Kawatake Mokuami script series, had been published as articles by the Ginza’s Kabuki Shinpō (Kabuki News) Company. They covered 'Nakamitsu', 'Four Thousand Ryō' (Yonsenryō) (in Japanese) and ‘Kagatobi’. When I went I had no idea that they had been successively published and had been delivered from a Ginza bookstore. I leapt for joy and straight away started going to him and borrowing them so that I could indulge myself by reading them.

=== Korea ===
In 1884, Aston was the first European diplomatic representative to reside in Korea. Political instability caused him to leave in 1885. In 1885–1887, Aston continued Korean language studies in Tokyo with Kim Chae-guk. This Korean teacher composed a number of stories for Aston to use as practice. Aston donated these manuscript versions of Korean folk tales to the Asiatic Museum in St. Petersburg, Russia and they were published in 2004. This part of Aston's personal collection is now preserved in the Institute of Oriental Manuscripts of the Russian Academy of Sciences in St Petersburg.

== Later years ==
After retiring from the consular service, Aston published books on Japanese literature and Japanese religion as well as a number of articles on Korean subjects. He died on 22 November 1911 in Beer, Devon. Along with the Japanese books already mentioned Aston's substantial collection of Chinese and Korean books was acquired by Cambridge University Library after his death.

== Research notes ==
The only known likeness of Aston is in the National Portrait Gallery in London. A 1911 crayon drawing of Aston by Minnie Agnes Cohen only suggests what he might have looked like as a younger man. Very little is known about Aston's personal life because he left no letters or diaries.

== Selected works ==
In a statistical overview derived from writings by and about William George Aston, OCLC/WorldCat encompasses roughly 90+ works in 200+ publications in 4 languages and 3,000+ library holdings.

- 1869 — A Short Grammar of the Japanese Spoken Language
- 1872 — A Grammar of the Japanese Written Language, with a short chrestomathy
- 1877 — A Grammar of the Japanese Written Language
- 1888 — A Grammar of the Japanese Spoken Language
- 1889 — Early Japanese history
- 1896 — Nihongi; Chronicles of Japan from the Earliest Times to A.D. 697
- 1899 — A History of Japanese Literature (available at Wikisource)
- 1899 — Toriwi--its derivation
- 1902 — Littérature japonaise
- 1905 — Shinto, the Way of the Gods.
- 1907 — Shinto, the Ancient Religion of Japan

=== Articles ===
- 1879 — "H.M.S. Phaeton at Nagasaki," Transactions of the Asiatic Society of Japan, Vol. 7, pp. 323–336.

== See also ==
- Anglo-Japanese relations
- British Japan Consular Service
- List of ambassadors of the United Kingdom to Korea
