= Park Jiha =

Korean composer and multi-instrumentalist

Park Jiha (박지하) is a Korean composer and multi-instrumentalist.

She employs a variety of traditional Korean musical instruments including the piri, yanggeum, and saenghwang to create postminimalist compositions. She has toured internationally across Europe, Australia, and the United States. Her 2016 debut album Communion, later receiving a wider release on German record label Glitterbeat in 2018, was nominated for Best Crossover Album and Best Crossover Performance at the 2017 Korean Music Awards. The album garnered positive reviews from Pitchfork, The Guardian, and The Quietus among other sources for independent experimental music. Her sophomore record Philos was released in November 2018 on the largest Korean indie label Mirrorball. Her third studio album The Gleam was released on 25 February 2022, and received positive reviews.

== Discography ==
- A Record of Autobiographical Sounds (2015)
- Communion (2016)
- Philos (2018)
- The Gleam (2022)
- All Living Things (2025)
