= Kim Chae-guk =

Kim Chae-guk (Korean: 김재국), also known as Jae Kuk Kim, was a late 19th-century Korean writer and teacher.

According to the British diplomat William George Aston Kim Chae-guk was already his Korean teacher during the period the British Embassy was briefly located in Jong Dong in 1885.

== Kunstkamera preservation ==
After being forced to leave Korea, Aston continued Korean language studies with Kim in Tokyo in 1885–1887.

In his role as a teacher, Kim composed a number of stories for Aston to use as practice. Many years later, Aston donated these manuscript versions of Korean folk tales to the Asiatic Museum (Kunstkamera) in Saint Petersburg.

At some time before the Russian Revolution, a number of Aston's Korean books and manuscripts, including work by Kim, were added to the museum's collection of Korean material. This part of Aston's personal collection is now preserved in the Academy of Sciences in Saint Petersburg. The remainder of Aston's substantial collection of Japanese, Chinese and Korean books was acquired by Cambridge University Library after his death.

== Corean Tales ==
Kim's collection of Corean Tales (Russian Ким Чегук Корейские новеллы 2004) contains 60 short stories.

The posthumously published work has one edition published in Russian. The book is held by four libraries worldwide.
