= Counterweight (novel) =

2021 novel by Djuna

- Author: Djuna
- Translator: Anton Hur
- Language: English
- Genres: science fiction
- Published: 2023
- Publisher: Pantheon
- Publication place: United States
- Pages: 176
- ISBN: 9780593317211

Counterweight (Korean: 평형추) is a 2021 science fiction novel by South Korean pseudonymous writer Djuna (Dyoo-nuh; Korean: 듀나). It is Djuna's first novel to be translated and published in English. It was translated by Anton Hur and published by Pantheon in 2023. The novel contains elements of cyberpunk and is written as a thriller involving a clandestine security officer attempting to protect an employee with brain-augmented information about their corporation's space elevator, which is supposedly hidden in the elevator's balancing counterweight.

== The Author ==
Djuna has been described as "a literary giant in Korea", and since the 1990s one of the most prolific and important writers in the South Korean science fiction field. It is Djuna's first novel to be translated and published in English.

== Development ==
The initial concept for the book was developed from a draft movie script that Djuna wrote about ten years before it was finally published as a book. Djuna's motivation behind the novel was rooted in the exploration of Korea's relationship with other neighbouring countries in Southeast Asia, particularly as the country's growth has led to the surfacing of historic prejudices against it. The author aimed for the novel to explore how this situation might manifest and evolve in the future. Whilst Djuna wanted to move away from the influence of western authors such as George Orwell or Joseph Conrad, the book somewhat remains a "pastiche" of their works, and Djuna's fictional Patusan takes its name from Conrad's invention of the island in Lord Jim. The book's heavy use of futuristic technological terminology may also echo William Gibson's Neuromancer.

== Plot ==
Set in an unspecified future in Patusan, an imaginary tropical island near Malaysia, the narrative unfolds around the Earth's inaugural AI-directed space elevator, a creation of the Korean megacorporation (chaebol) LK. The megacorporation's involvement, likened to the island's colonization by Korea, is opposed by a rebel force called the Patusan Liberation Front. The tale is told through the eyes of Mac, a disenchanted security executive at the company, who delves into the odd conduct of a subordinate and its connection to the recent demise of the firm's chief executive. As the novel progresses, the protagonist becomes involved in investigating and then protecting a strange company employee named Choi Gangwu, a shy man interested in butterflies who oddly also has peculiarly advanced knowledge of the company and a passion for the space elevator. Choi turns out to have brain implants containing some of the memories and personality of the deceased former LK president, making him a target for various underground organizations and rebels, but also making him a pawn in the power struggles of senior leaders of the firm.

== Reviews ==
Hari Kunzru reviewed the book for The New York Times. He described it as "an efficient, fast-paced cyberpunk story" and noted that the discussion of artificial intelligence in the book is a timely topic.

Andrea M. Pawley reviewed the book for Washington Independent Review of Books. She wrote that the book "packs more corporate intrigue into its 176 pages than most stories manage in three times the space" and concluded that "fast-paced and exhilarating, Counterweight is worth the ride".

Charlie Jane Anders reviewed the book for the Washington Post. She called the book a "dizzyingly subversive cyberpunk thriller", concluding that "In true Philip K. Dick style, Djuna serves up enough paranoia and clever ideas to keep you guessing.".

Kate Knibbs reviewed the book for Wired, describing it as "a jaunty cyberpunk thriller about memory implantation, space colonization, and identity".
