= The Dwarf (Cho novel) =

1978 novel by Cho Se-hui

- Paperback Reprint Cover
- Author: Cho Se-hui
- Translators: Bruce and Ju-Chan Fulton
- Language: English
- Genre: Novel
- Published: October 2006 (University of Hawaii Press)
- Publication place: United States
- Media type: Print (hardback & paperback)
- Pages: 224
- ISBN: 978-0824831011

The Dwarf is the translation by Bruce and Ju-Chan Fulton of a Korean linked-story novel, (Korean: 난장이가 쏘아 올린 작은 공; lit. "A little ball launched by a dwarf"), written by Cho Se-hui and published in 1978. The Dwarf was a best-seller in Korea and was also made into a feature film titled A Small Ball Shot by a Midget (1980) by director Lee Won-se.

== Plot ==
The Dwarf is a work of social criticism which focuses on the forced redevelopment of Hangbook-dong (행복동) in Seoul in the 1970s, and the human costs that accompanied it.

The Dwarf revolves around a literal “little guy,” and his family and friends, and their changing economic and social relationships which are destroyed by Korean modernization. The book follows the dwarf’s stunted existence through nasty cityscapes. A short cast of characters cycles in and out of the stories in anachronistic order.

The dwarf lives in the Felicity District in Eden Province. The District is chosen for redevelopment and the dwarf and his family are evicted. The dwarf eventually commits suicide in a factory smokestack while his family is sundered. Family members argue that society has misjudged the dwarf, by seeing his height and not his skills. This focus on literal measure is a subtle irony which references several aspects of modernization, including the necessities of measuring everything, regularizing the size of everything, and commodifying everything. At the time the novel was being written the Park government roamed the streets of Seoul, its fashion police literally measuring the hair-length of men and the skirt-length of women. In the factories, meanwhile, standardization, routinization and the tyranny of the time clock erased human differences between workers when not actually erasing humanity.

This scarring and diminution is not merely physical, it is social and economic as well. The dwarf dies, his son becomes a murderer, and the dwarf’s daughter is reduced to semi-prostitution to steal back her family's right to a home. This last theft fails; when the daughter returns to her home there is no sign of it ever having existed.

=== Short stories ===
- The Möbius Strip
- Knifeblade
- Space Travel
- A Little Ball Launched by a Dwarf
- On the Footbridge
- Orbital Rotation
- City of Machines
- The Cost of Living for a Family of Ungang Laborers
- The Fault Lies with God as Well
- The Klein Bottle
- The Spinyfish Entering My Net
- Epilogue

== Style ==
The Dwarf combines realism with a fantastic structure that places readers in the horrific and fragmented era the work describes. Cho mixes a kaleidoscopic narrative, powerful use of modern scientific symbols, and a flat and direct tone. The interlocking narrative arcs and often disconcerting internal shifts in narrator or time frame are both supportive of the theme of the book and ultimately rewarding. This type of literature has been called slipstream fiction.

The Dwarf was written between 1975 and 1978 as a series of loosely linked short stories published across several Korean magazines. In Korea these works were collected into A Dwarf Launches a Little Ball, which has been renamed The Dwarf for its English publication. The Dwarf is a yŏnjak sosŏl (linked novel) or collection of separately published short stories which can stand alone or supplement each other.

== Characters ==
- Father: A dwarf of 3 feet 10 inches in “real life.”
- Mother: Like "Father", she is a poor labor worker.
- Youngsu (첫째 아들, 영수): the older son
- Youngho (둘째 아들, 영호): the younger son.
- Younghee (딸, 영희): the daughter.

== Title ==
According to Reversion Korean Syntax, the proper title is not 'Nanjangi'(난장이), but rather 'nanjaengi'(난쟁이).

== Influence ==
The Dwarf was an extension of and addition to Korean Minjung Munhak Theory (민중 문학론). Some critics argued that the novel was just an example of paternalism aimed at the laboring classes.

Reflecting on the novel's tremendous success, Cho said in 2009, "I can't believe that novel has been read until the present."
