= Soyeon Jeong =

South Korean writer (born 1983)

- Born: 1983 (age 42–43); Masan, South Korea
- Education: Seoul National University (BA); Yonsei University (JD)
- Occupations: writer, lawyer
- Writing career
- Pen name: Jay Jeong
- Period: 2004–present
- Genre: Science fiction

Korean name
- Hangul: 정소연
- Hanja: 鄭昭延
- RR: Jeong Soyeon
- MR: Chŏng Soyŏn

Soyeon "Jay" Jeong (Korean: 정소연; born February 25, 1983) is a South Korean science fiction writer, educator, translator, and lawyer. She is the founding member of the Science Fiction Writers Union of the Republic of Korea, and has been the head of the union since December 19, 2017.

== Life and career ==
Jeong was born in 1983 in Masan, South Gyeongsang Province, South Korea. She attended the Seoul National University, where she majored in social welfare and philosophy. She earned her JD from Yonsei Law School, Seoul, and currently resides in Seoul.

Deeply engaged in the South Korean science fiction fandom community since her late teens, she is considered an important figure in the field. She began her career as a science fiction author in 2004, and she was one of the founding members of Webzine Mirror. She mostly translated modern American science fiction, including The Speed of Dark, Where Late the Sweet Birds Sang, The Martian Child, and Beggars in Spain. As a writer, she is best known for her award-winning short story Cosmic Go. The comics version of this short story was released for free and went viral. Her short story collection Yeonghee Next Door was published in 2015.

As a lawyer, she is mostly known for her advocacy activities. She is an active member of Minbyun (Lawyers for a Democratic Society). Lately she is known to have begun her own scholarship foundation, Boda Initiative, which supports tertiary education for less privileged girls in Asia.

Jeong taught science fiction writing at Munji Culture Center from 2009 to 2011. She is currently a lecturer at Changbi Academy.

== Awards ==
- 2005 Science and Technology Creative Award (Cosmic Go)
- 2006 Seoul National University Literary Award
- 2017 Seoul Bar Association Commendation

== Works(partial) ==
=== Works in Korean ===
- Cosmic Go (short story, 2005)
- Yeonghui Next Door (Changbi, 2015; YA Book of the Year 2015)

=== Works in translation ===
- Cosmic Go : in Readymade Bodhisattva, Kaya Press
- Home : Guernica
- The Flowering : Clarkesworld Magazine
