= Cho Se-hui =

Korean author (1942–2022)

- Born: 20 August 1942; Gapyeong, Keiki-dō, Korea, Empire of Japan
- Died: 25 December 2022 (aged 80); Seoul, South Korea
- Citizenship: South Korean
- Writing career
- Language: Korean
- Notable work: The Dwarf

- Cho Se-hui
- Hangul: 조세희
- Hanja: 趙世熙
- RR: Jo Sehui
- MR: Cho Sehŭi

Cho Se-hui (20 August 1942 – 25 December 2022) was a South Korean author.

== Early life ==
Cho Se-hui was born in Gapyeong, Keiki-dō, Korea, Empire of Japan (now Gyeonggi Province, South Korea) on 20 August 1942. Cho attended Seorabeol Art College and Kyunghee University in Seoul. Cho was a member of the so-called "hangul generation," which was called that because its members were the first to be educated in the Korean language (the previous years had been under Japanese domination and language, and before the colonial period most scholars had studied Chinese).

== Work ==
Cho's writing is sparse and explicit, though it can also seem surreal. His most famous work is The Dwarf. The Dwarf is a yŏnjak sosŏl (linked novel) or collection of separately published short stories which can stand alone or supplement each other. This fractured structure, along with Cho's jump-cutting, juxtapositional, and un-sign-posted narrative portrays a society that "severs men from the natural rhythms and shape of creation."

It is a powerful work of social criticism focusing on the forced redevelopment of Seoul in the 1970s, and the human costs that accompanied it. It combines biting realism with an often fantastic structure that pulls a reader into the difficult and fragmented era the work describes. Cho combines a kaleidoscopic narrative approach, powerful use of scientific symbols, and a dead-flat and deadeye narrative tone. Reading The Dwarf requires some attention, but the interlocking narrative arcs and often disconcerting internal shifts in narrator or time frame are both supportive of the theme of the book and ultimately rewarding. Koreans consider this work to be one of the critical works of the 1970s.

== Works in translation ==
- The Dwarf University of Hawaii Press (October 2006); translated by Ju-chan and Bruce Fulton ISBN 0-8248-3101-2
- The Voice of the Governor-General and Other Stories of Modern Korea (Contributor) Eastbridge (June 2002) ISBN 1-891936-06-9
- City of Machines Korea Journal Vol.30 No.3 March 1990 pp. 68–74
- On the Overhead Bridge Korea Journal Vol.20 No.10 October 1980 pp. 30–35
- Der Zwerg (난장이가 쏘아올린 작은 공 )
- одой хуний хθθРґθсн БяцхАН БθмБθлθґ (난장이가 쏘아올린 작은 공)
- A Törpe (난장이가 쏘아올린 작은 공)
- La Petite balle lancée par un nain (난장이가 쏘아올린 작은 공)

== Works in Korean ==
- The Dwarf (1978)
- Time Travel (1983)
- Root of Silence (1985)

== Awards ==
- Dong-in Literary Award (1979)
