= Pampanga (disambiguation) =

Pampanga is a province in the Central Luzon region of the Philippines.

Pampanga may also refer to:

- Pampanga Eye, a Ferris wheel in the Philippines
- Pampanga Hotel, a heritage house in the Philippines
- Pampanga River, in the Central Luzon region of the Philippines

== See also ==
- Pampangan language
