= Archdiocesan Chancery, Pampanga =

Heritage house in San Fernando, Pampanga, Philippines

Archdiocesan Chancery
- Arzobispado de Pampanga
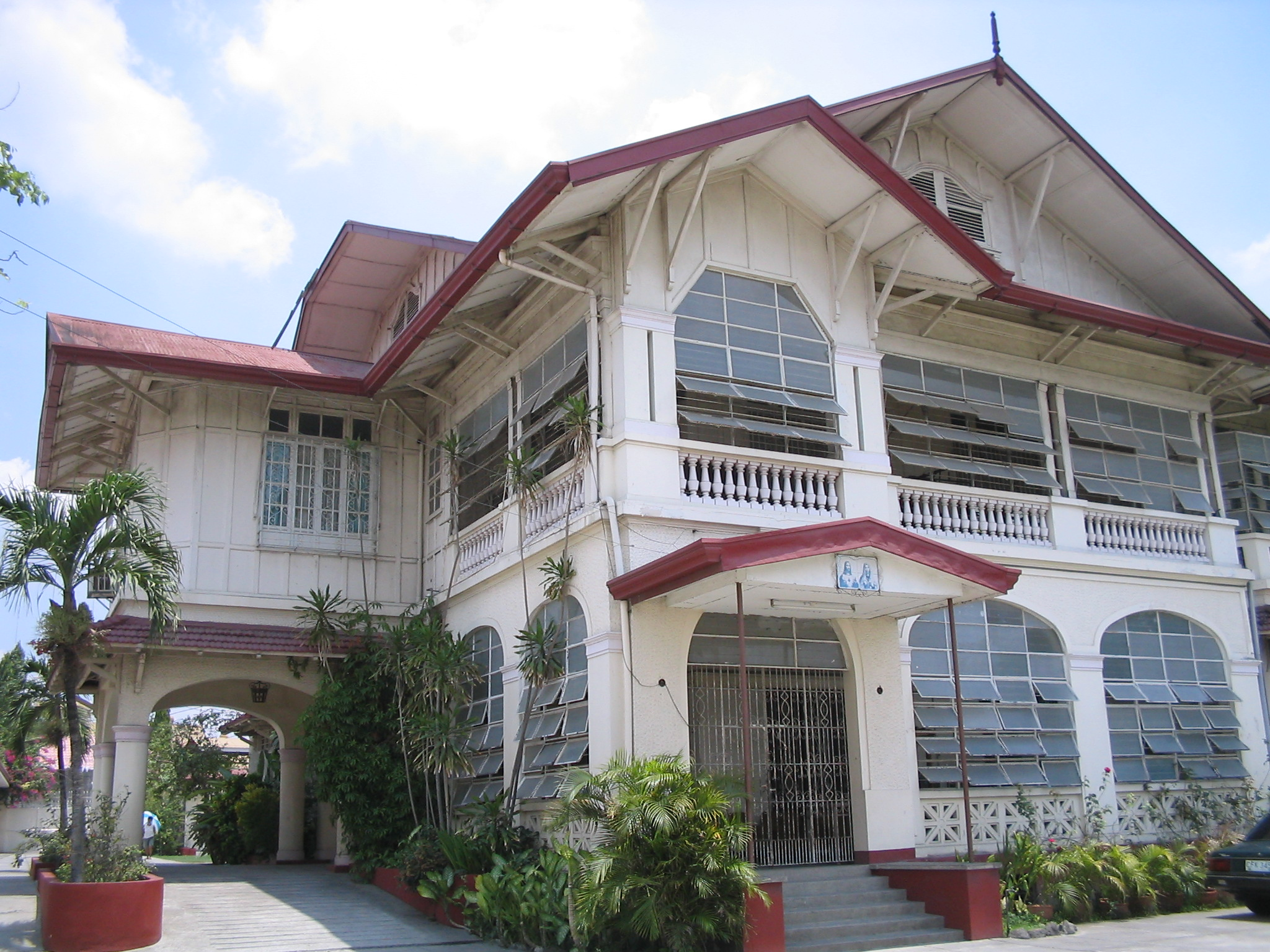
- Archdiocesan Chancery
- Interactive map of the Archdiocesan Chancery area

General information
- Location: City of San Fernando, Pampanga, Philippines
- Coordinates: 15°2′2.18″N 120°41′37.81″E
- Owner: Roman Catholic Archdiocese of San Fernando

The Archdiocesan Chancery is a heritage house in the City of San Fernando, Pampanga. It was the former residence of Luis Wenceslao Dison and Felisa Hizon that was purchased by the Roman Catholic Archdiocese of San Fernando. It is now being used as the Archdiocesan Chancery.
