= El Círculo Fernandino =

El Circulo Fernandino is both the name of the oldest social club in Pampanga, Philippines, and the name of its annual reception and ball. Members comprise the elite of San Fernando City, Pampanga, who host the dance which opens the annual the fiesta celebrations that culminate on May 30.

== History ==
Formed sometime in the 1920s, the club succeeded the earlier group called La Gente Alegre de San Fernando (The Merry Folks of San Fernando).

According to John Larkin in his book The Pampangans, “a new phenomenon, town and provincial social clubs, which sprang up in the early American years, demonstrated how the native upper class flourished under the new regime. These organizations, exclusively for the elite, provided among other things an opportunity for young single adults to socialize with and meet others of the same age and class.”

Larkin later mentions, “the Pampangan elite, a greater number of them emulating late nineteenth century patterns of behavior, turned their attention to peer group organizations, politics, and extra provincial activities. They resolved many of their economic and political problems by banding together into various agricultural organizations and political parties. The trend toward forming upper-class social clubs for amusement also continued. Such groups as the Young Generation in Macabebe, the Kundiman in Angeles City, and the Circulo Fernandino in San Fernando were all patterned after organizations formed in the early American years.”

=== Later history ===
El Circulo Fernandino organised annual parties to achieve this, but these were interrupted by the Second World War. The club resumed its social activities after the War, only to be halted again in 1987. In the Fifties, the annual community dance was held at the Riverside Country Club Auditorium, a wooden structure built beside the Pampanga Capitol (seat of Provincial Government at San Fernando). This was large enough to accommodate about a 100 people. The event became popular and neighboring towns were invited. After which it was held in an open-air fenced area at the back of the auditorium. In the Fifties/Sixties big bands the likes of Carding Cruz Band performed for the event. Guests were announced as they enter the gate much like the grand parties of Europe.

As part of keeping up with Filipino traditions, the classic Rigodon de Honor (the country's analogue to a court dance), is performed by the prominent citizens of San Fernando. Men are traditionally garbed in their best piña barongs and the women are dressed in colourful ternos and bedecked in jewellery.

In 1997, the club decided to revive its annual receptions under the presidency of Engr. Angelo David and Dr. Leticia Cordero-Yap. The El Circulo Fernandino Foundation, Inc. was formed as a result of this revival, transforming the club from a strictly social club to a more socially-involved organisation.

== Related celebrations ==
The Thomasian was a social club for residents of nearby Santo Tomas, formed when the town was still part of San Fernando. The organisation hosted the annual Sábado de Gloria (Holy Saturday) Ball, which is the oldest surviving social event in Pampanga.

== Image gallery ==
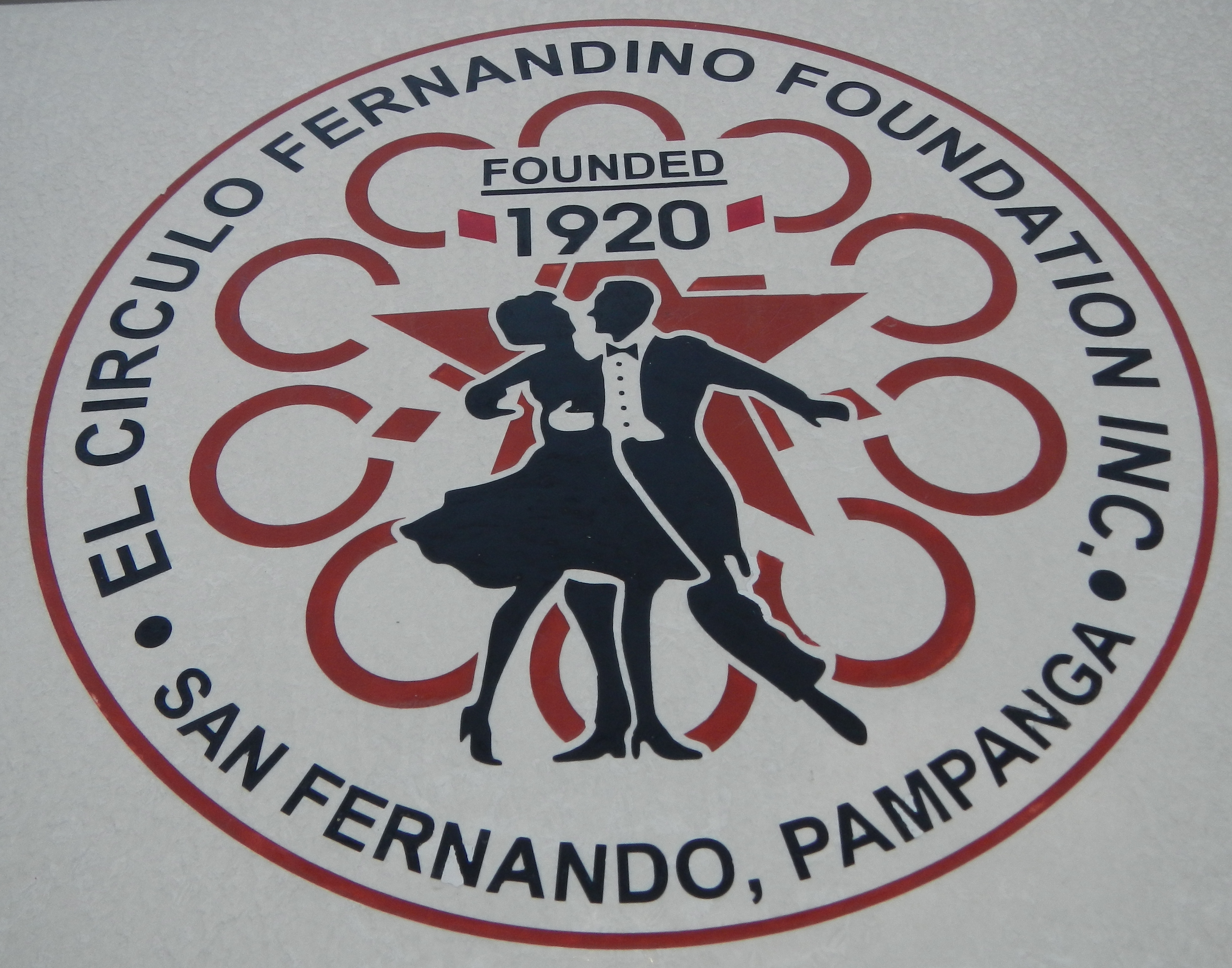
Official seal, logo

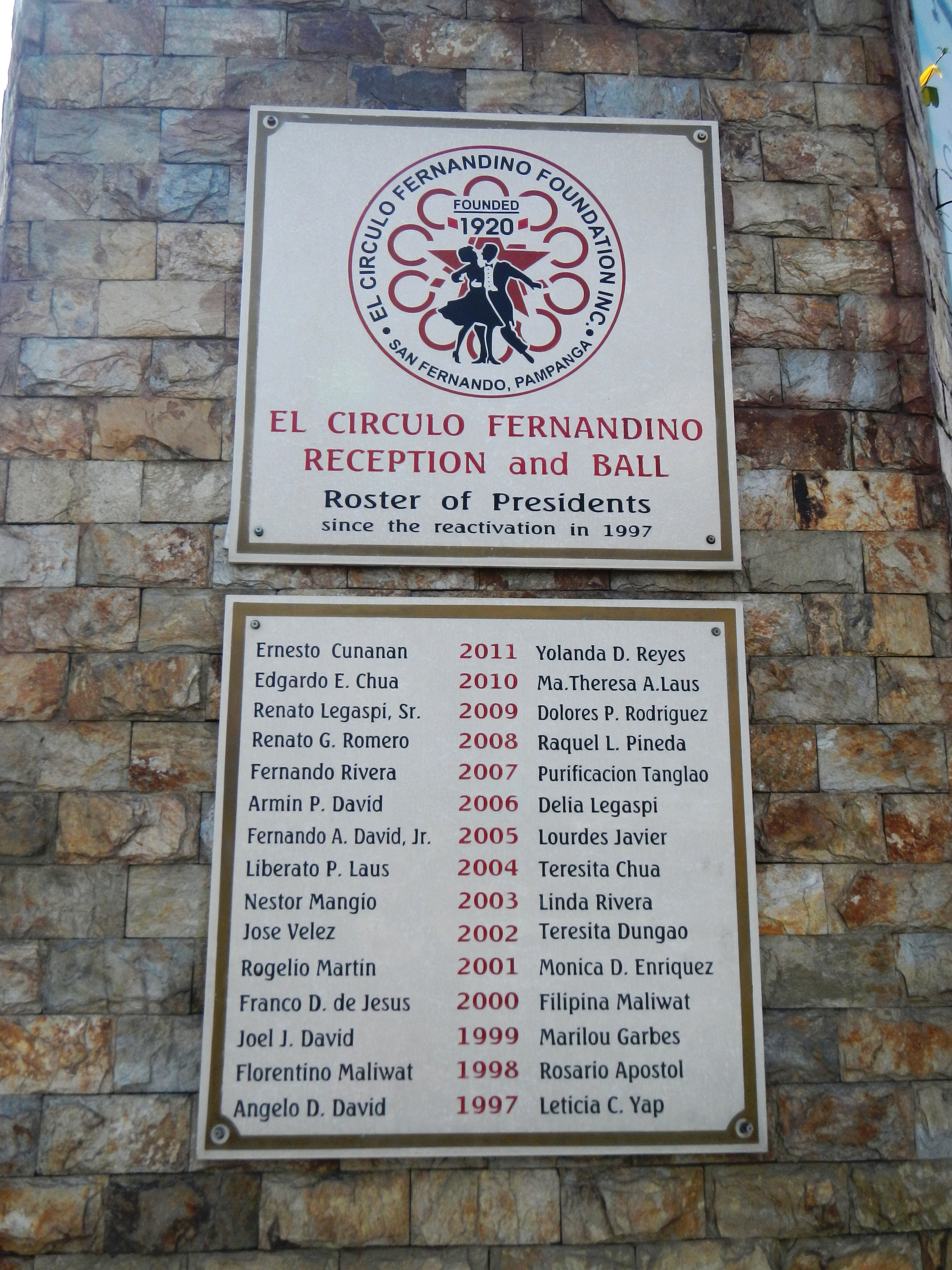
Historical marker, San Fernando City Olongapo-Gapan Highway

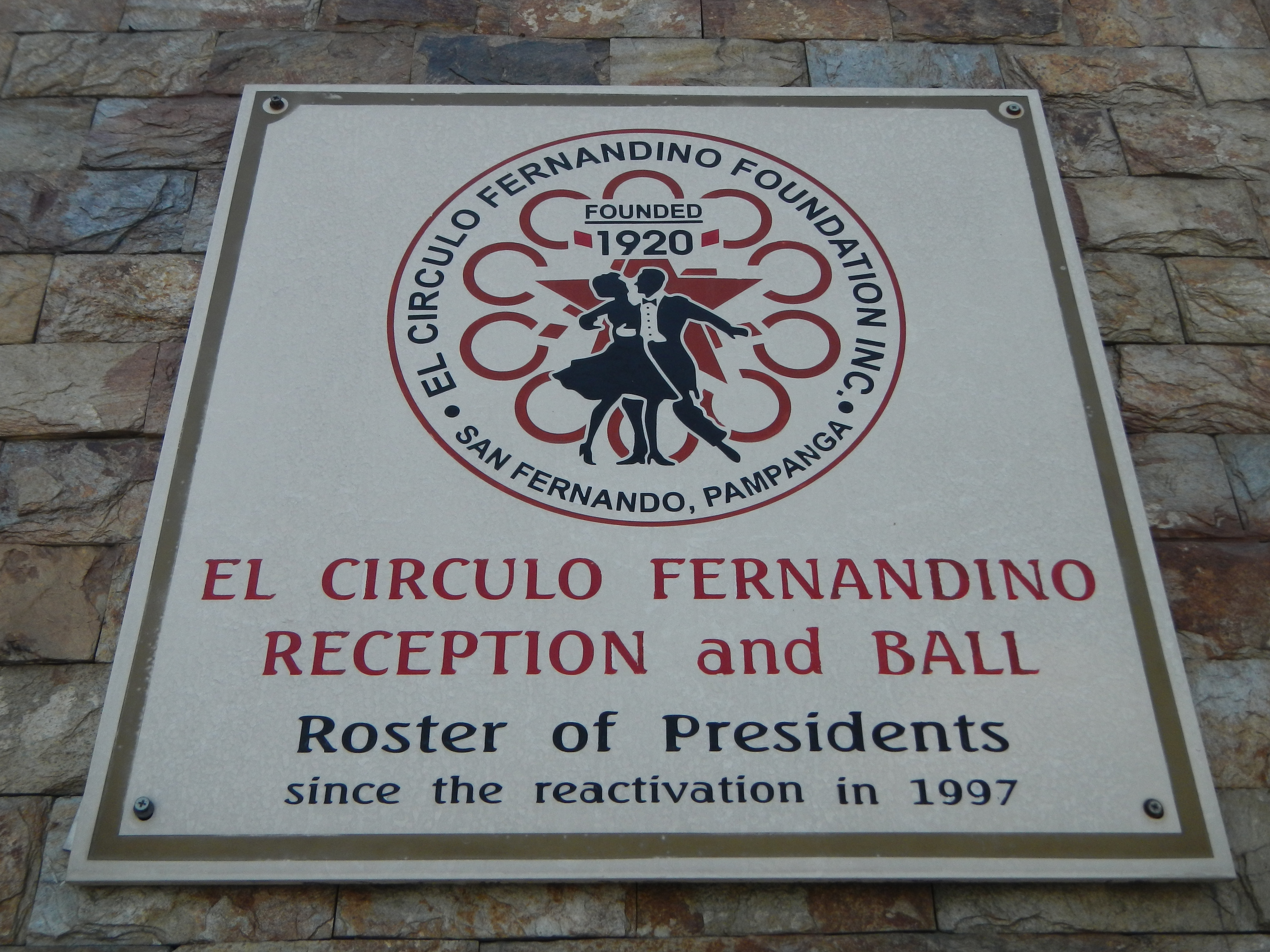
Marker
