= San Fernando, Pampanga =

Capital city of Pampanga, Philippines

San Fernando San Fernandu (Kapampangan)
- Component city
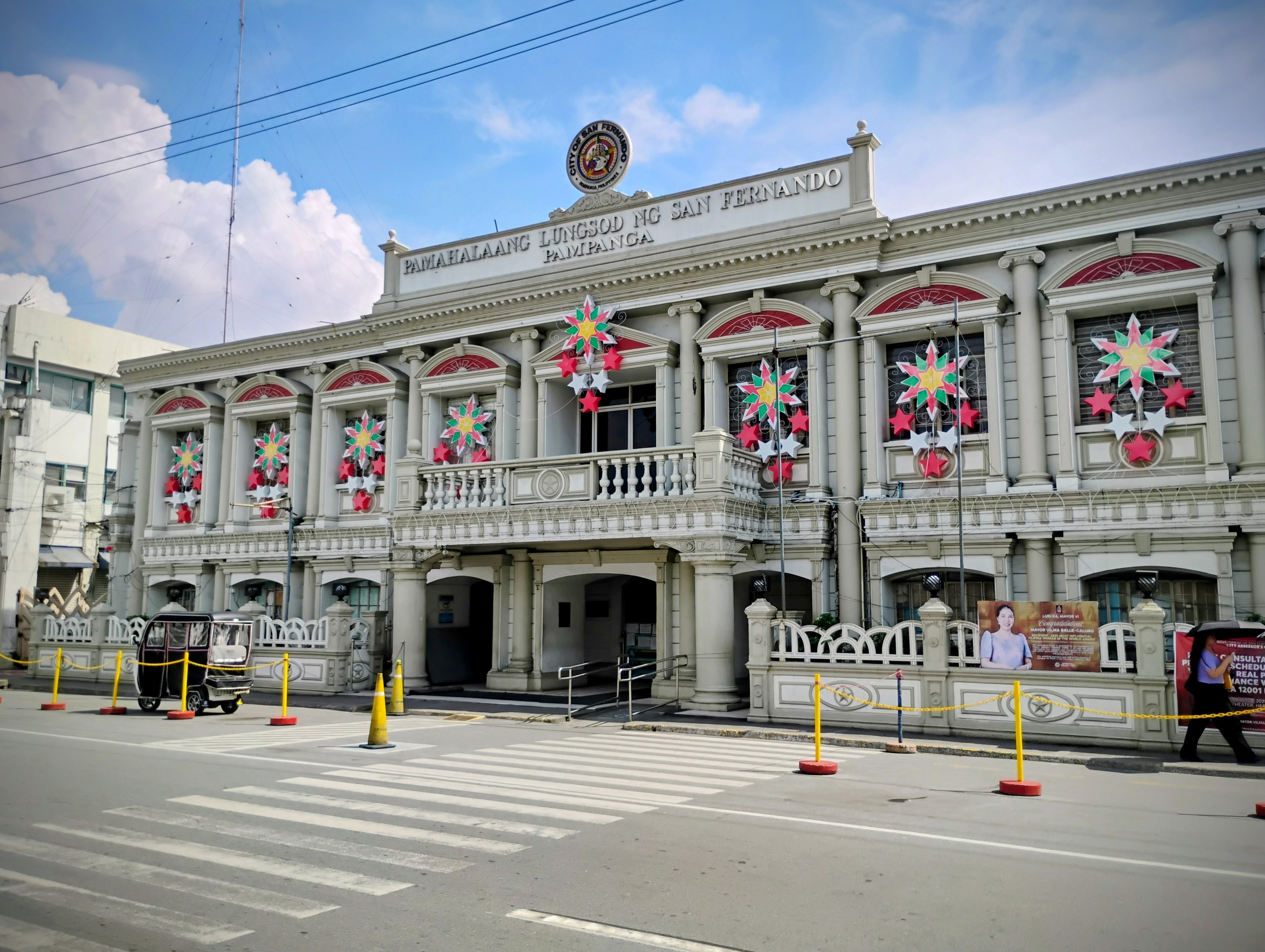
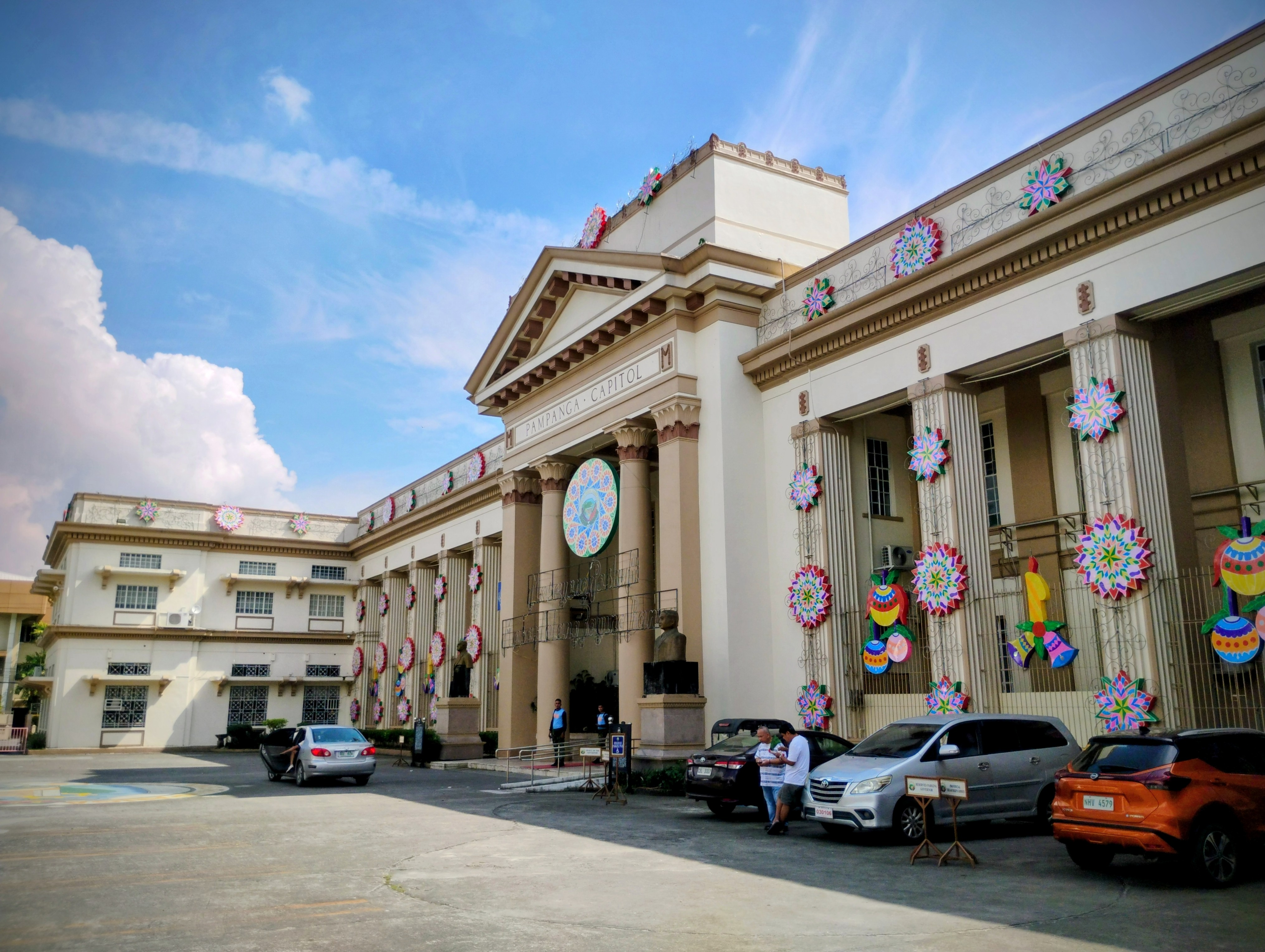
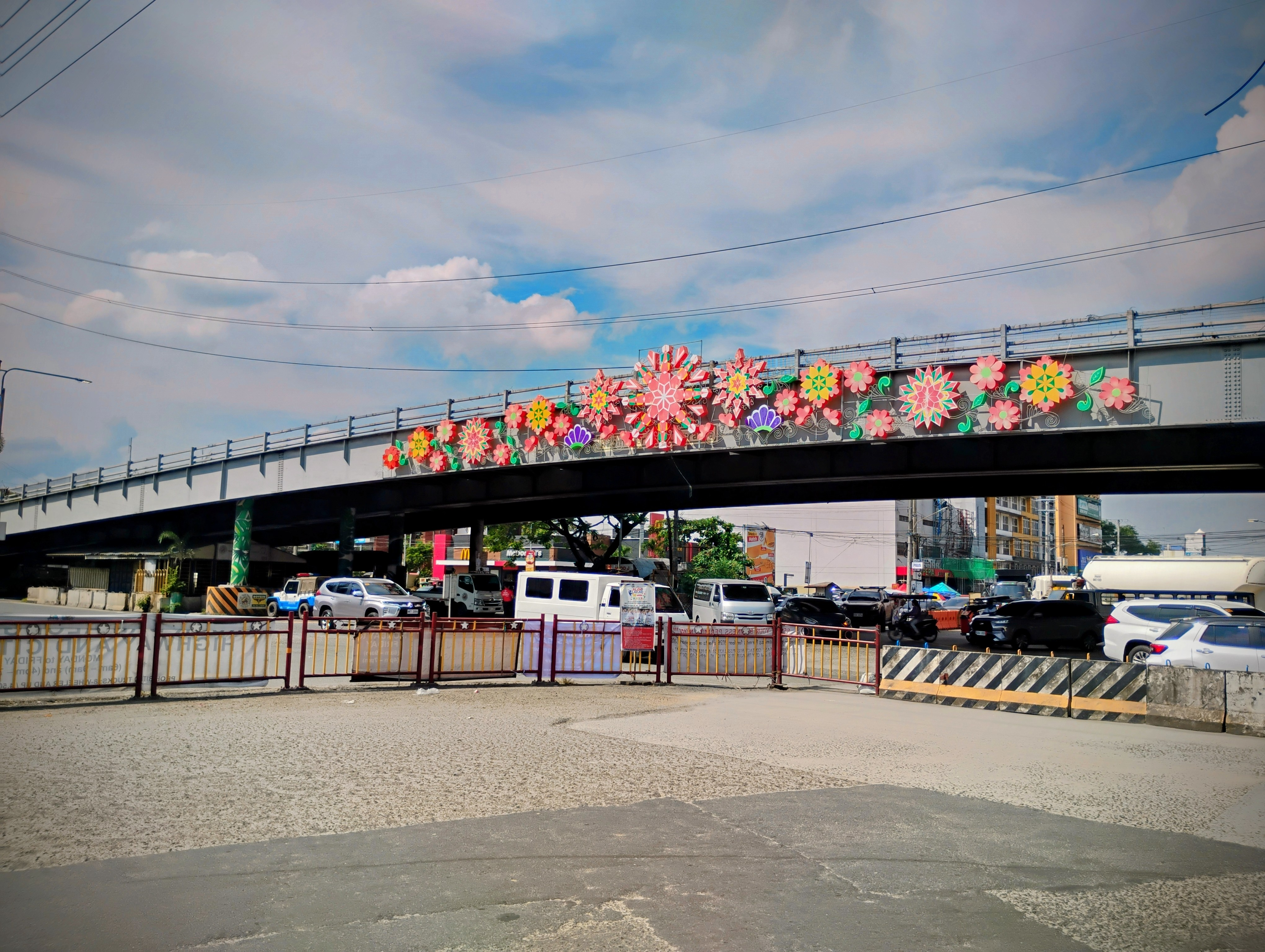
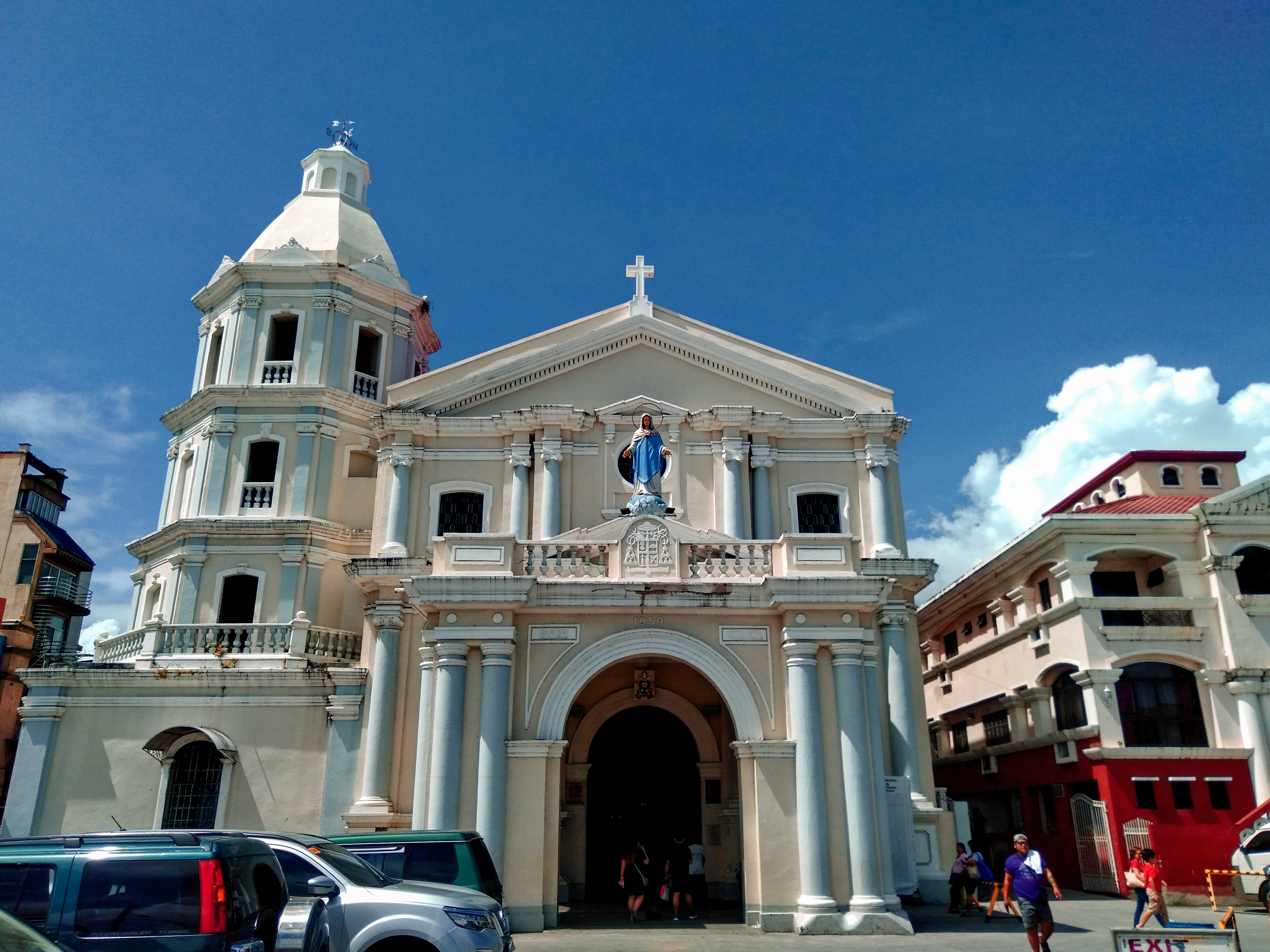
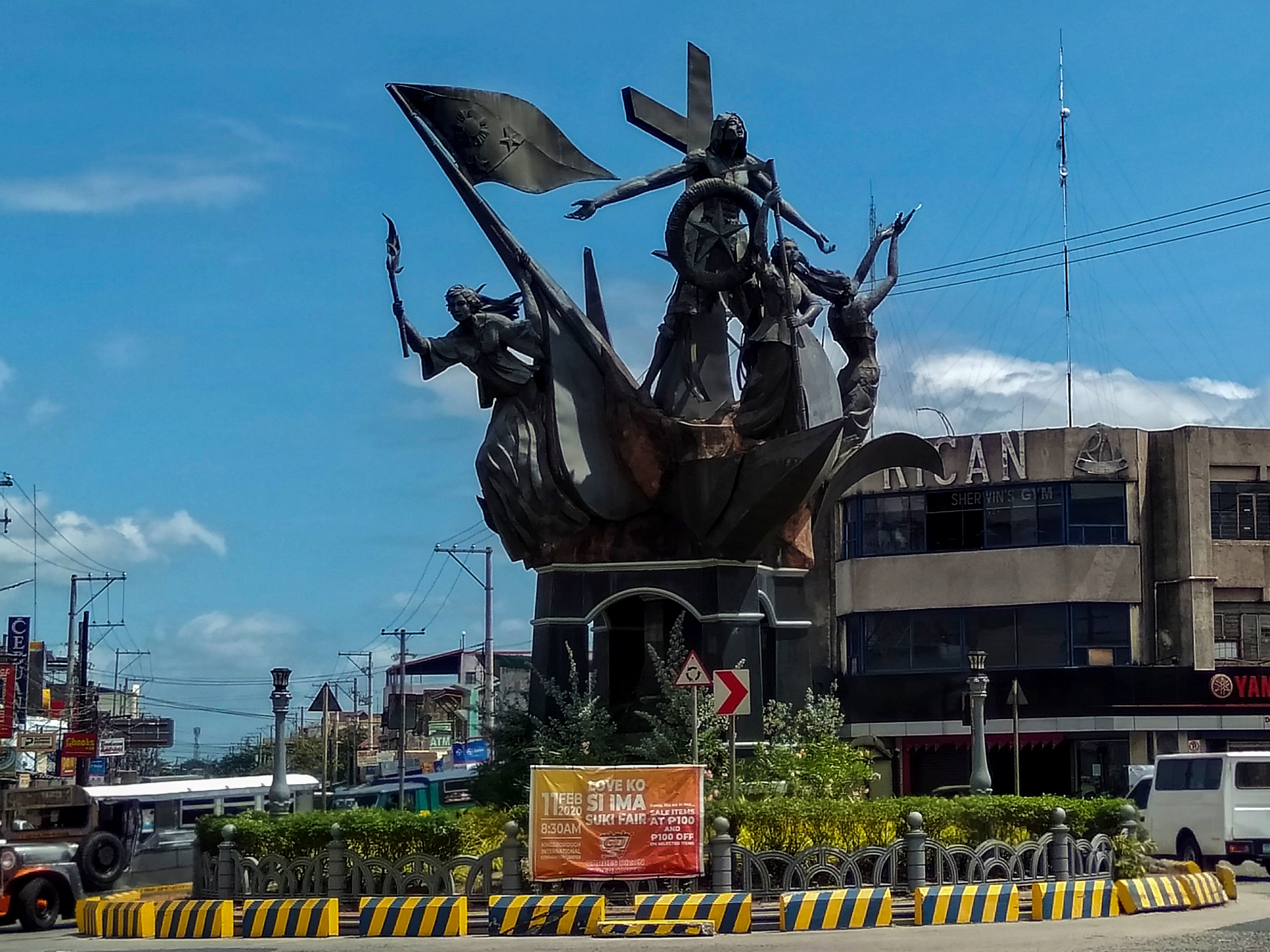
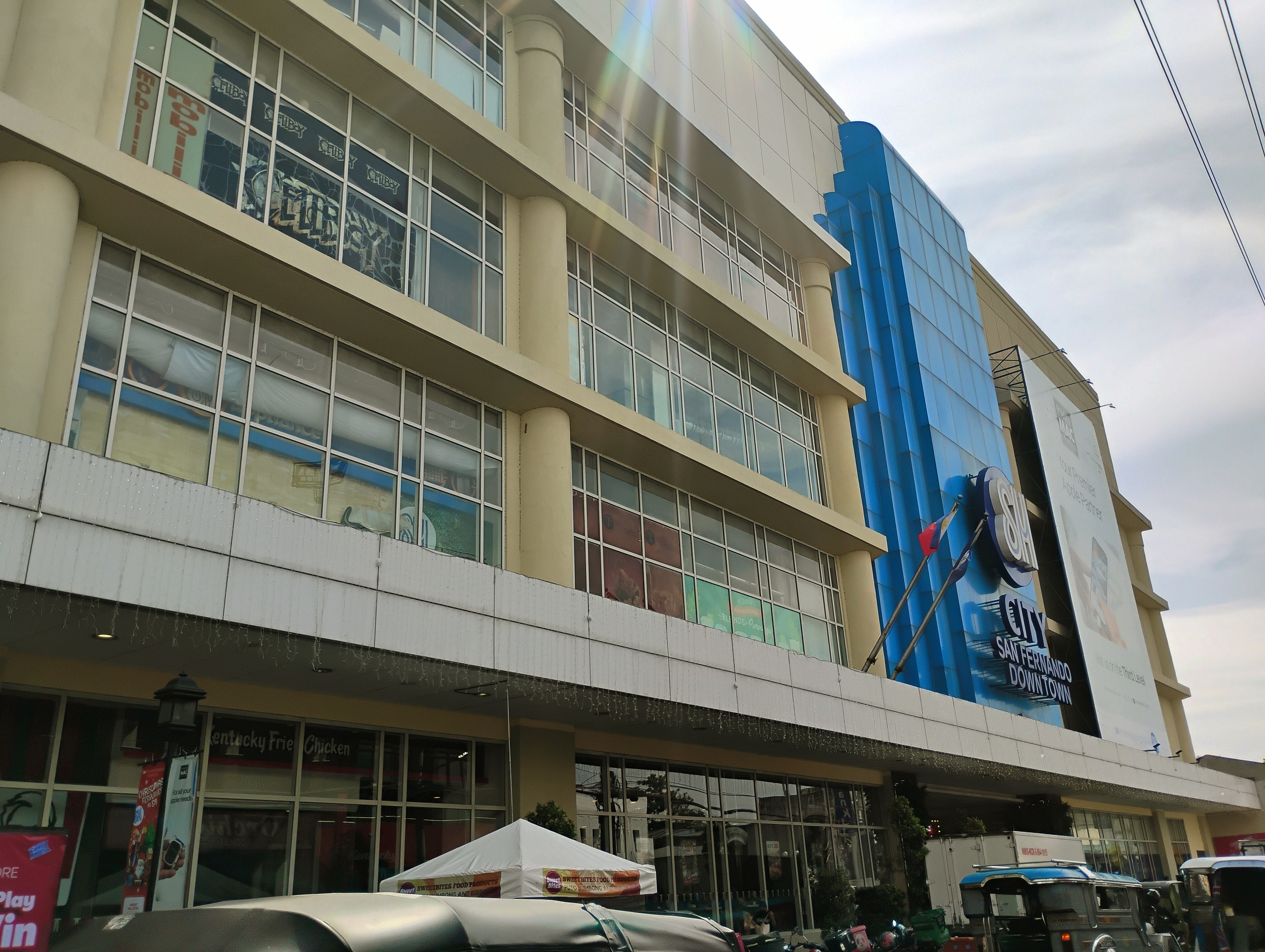
- From top, left to right: San Fernando City Hall; Pampanga Provincial Capitol; Lazatin flyover; San Fernando Metropolitan Cathedral; Monumento Fernandino; SM City San Fernando Downtown

- Flag Seal
- Nickname(s): Home of the Giant Lantern & Christmas Capital of the Philippines
- Anthem: Himno Fernandino (Fernandino Hymn)
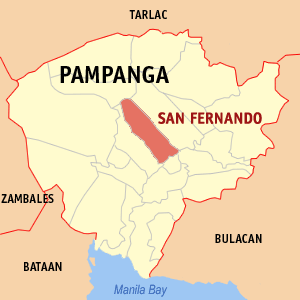
- Map of Pampanga with San Fernando highlighted
- Interactive map of San Fernando
- Location within the Philippines
- Coordinates: 15°02′N 120°41′E
- Country: Philippines
- Region: Central Luzon
- Province: Pampanga
- District: 3rd district
- Founded: August 16, 1754
- Cityhood: February 4, 2001
- Named for: Ferdinand III of Castile
- Barangays: 35 (see Barangays)

Government
  - Type: Sangguniang Panlungsod
  - Mayor: Vilma Balle Caluag
  - Vice Mayor: Aurelio Brenz P. Gonzales
  - Representative: Alyssa Michaela M. Gonzales
  - Councilors: Members: Noel T. Tulabut; Reginaldo B. David; Harvey A. Quiwa; Celestino S. Dizon; Raquel L. Pineda; Angelo D. Hizon, Jr.; Jesus P. Cuyugan; Mark Joseph C. Carreon; Jayson C. Sicat; Elmer M. Bengco
  - Electorate: 207,416 voters (2025)

Area
  - Total: 67.74 km^{2} (26.15 sq mi)
- Elevation: 33 m (108 ft)
- Highest elevation: 1,022 m (3,353 ft)
- Lowest elevation: −2 m (−6.6 ft)

Population (2024 census)
  - Total: 377,534
  - Density: 5,573/km^{2} (14,430/sq mi)
  - Households: 86,217
- Demonym(s): Fernandino (male); Fernandina (female)

Economy
  - Income class: 1st city income class
  - Poverty incidence: 3.95% (2023)
  - Revenue: ₱ 2,592 million (2024)
  - Assets: ₱ 585.3 million (2024)
  - Expenditure: ₱ 2,407 million (2024)
  - Liabilities: ₱ 1,878 million (2024)

Service provider
  - Electricity: San Fernando Electric Light and Power Company (SFELAPCO)
- Time zone: UTC+8 (PST)
- ZIP code: 2000
- PSGC: 0305416000
- IDD : area code: +63 (0)45
- Native languages: Kapampangan; Tagalog
- Catholic diocese: Archdiocese of San Fernando
- Patron saint: Saint Ferdinand III of Castile and León
- Website: cityofsanfernando.gov.ph

San Fernando, officially the City of San Fernando (Kapampangan: Ciudad/Lakanbalen ning San Fernandu; Filipino: Lungsod ng San Fernando), is a component city and capital of the province of Pampanga, Philippines. According to the 2024 census, it has a population of 377,534 people.

The city is named after King Ferdinand VI of Spain and placed under the patronage of Saint Ferdinand III of Castile and León, whose feast is celebrated every May 30. Popularly known as the "Christmas Capital of the Philippines", the city holds the annual Giant Lantern Festival every December where large parol are displayed in competition. CNN has hailed the city as 'Asia's Christmas capital'.

The city is known as the birthplace of José Abad Santos, the 5th chief justice of the Supreme Court of the Philippines and briefly served as the acting president of the Commonwealth of the Philippines during World War II.

It is one of the two provincial capital cities named San Fernando, the other being San Fernando, La Union in Ilocos Region.

== History ==
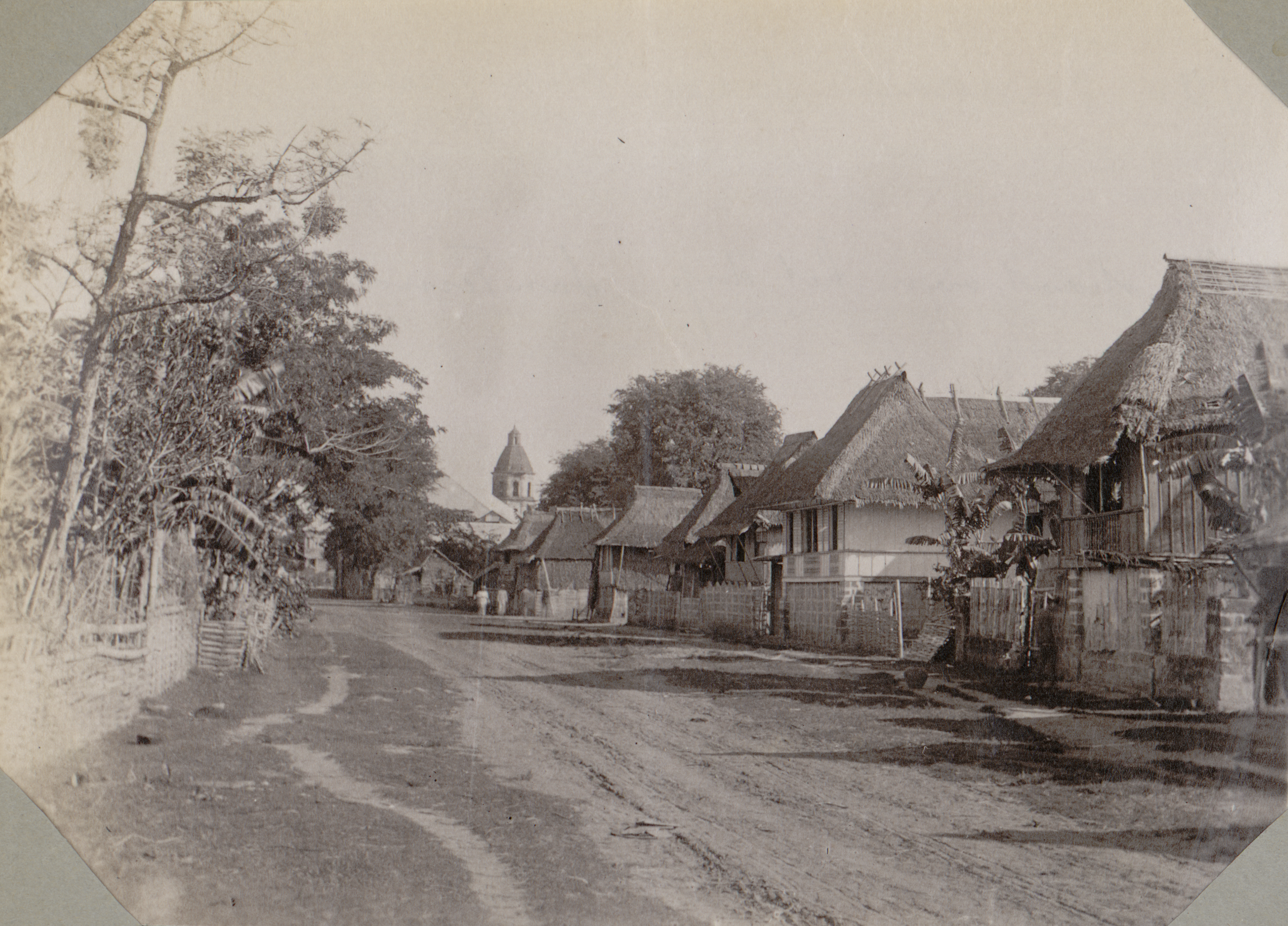
Houses along a road in San Fernando, circa pre-1900

=== Spanish Colonial Era ===
The town of San Fernando was founded in 1754 from the towns of Bacolor and Mexico. The first church was built in 1755 with wooden walls and nipa roofing. The municipal tribunal was erected later in the year in front of the town plaza using durable materials and thatched nipa roofing. Don Vidal de Arrozal served as its first gobernadorcillo that year.

In 1796, after serving as gobernadorcillo the previous year, Don Ángel Pantaleon de Miranda retired to Barrio Saguin, from where he started setting up his hacienda in Barrio Culiat. The barrio was separated from San Fernando on the December 8, 1829 as the new town of Angeles, with the Los Santos Ángeles Custodios as titular patrons.

An expediente requesting the transfer of the provincial capital of Pampanga to San Fernando was signed on the August 6, 1852. Real Cedula 745, approving the transfer of the provincial capital of Pampanga from Bacolor to San Fernando, was signed on September 11, 1881. This transfer did not, in the event, materialize.

In 1878, actions were made to create the town of Calulut. This new town would be composed of Calulut and the neighboring barrios of Bulaun, Malpitic, Sindalan, La Paz, Lara, Saguin, Telabastagan, Balete, Malinao, Pulung Bulu, Panipuan, Macabacle and the caserio of Pau in San Fernando, and Panipuan, Acle, Suclaban and the sitio of Gandus in Mexico. This plan did not materialize, owing to strong opposition from the parish priest of San Fernando.

Governor-General Eulogio Despujol and Manila Archbishop Bernardino Nozaleda inaugurated the San Fernando railroad station, together with the Bagbag-Mabalacat stretch of the Manila-Dagupan Railroad, on February 2, 1892. The station was second only to Manila in revenues that year, and was thus the most important provincial station of the Manila-Dagupan Railroad. On June 27 of the same year, José P. Rizal made a stopover in the town as part of his mission to recruit members to the La Liga Filipina.

On September 1, 1896, the town was declared to be in a state of war despite its peaceful situation. Brigadier General Diego de los Rios arrived on December 2 to calm the revolution that started in Manila on August 30. General Ruiz Serralde took over Rios's post on June 26, 1897, to maintain the peace in San Fernando. The revolution was not yet at its height with occasional exchanges of fire in some places in Pampanga.

On June 26, 1898, representatives from all Pampanga towns, except Macabebe, gathered in San Fernando to swear allegiance to Gen. Maximino Hizon, who was the provincial military governor and representative of the revolutionary president, Emilio Aguinaldo. On October 9, Aguinaldo and his cabinet visited the town, and were welcomed with so much applause and enthusiastic cheering from the public. He proceeded to the convento which was served as the military headquarters at that time.

=== American Colonial Era ===
On May 4, 1899, Philippine revolutionary troops led by General Antonio Luna burned the casa municipal, the town church and several houses to render them useless to the approaching American forces. On June 16, due to the strategic location of the town, Aguinaldo himself led Filipino forces in the Battle for San Fernando. The plan to retake the town proved unsuccessful. Calulut fell to the Americans on August 9.

On August 15, 1904, the Pampanga provincial government was finally transferred to San Fernando from Bacolor, by virtue of Act No. 1204 signed on July 22, 1904. This was during the term of Governor Macario Arnedo and Municipal President Juan Sengson. The town of Minalin became part of San Fernando that same year. It would regain its political independence in 1909.

On January 2, 1905, the town of Santo Tomas was consolidated with San Fernando by virtue of Act 1208.

On August 12, 1904, U.S. Secretary of War William H. Taft visited the town to get first-hand information and gather ideas for the governance of Pampanga. Owing to the short notice, a bamboo pavilion was hastily constructed for his visit, where he was welcomed with a banquet for 200 people. Taft would later be elected President of the United States.

In 1921, the Pampanga Sugar Development Company (PASUDECO) sugar central began its operations. The company was formed in 1918 by large-scale planters such as José de León, Augusto Gonzales, Francisco Tongio Liongson, Tomás Lazatin, Tomás Consunji, Francisco Hizon, José Henson, and Manuel Urquico in the San Fernando residence of Governor Honorio Ventura as part of a plan to construct a locally financed central.

In 1932, the Socialist Party of the Philippines was founded by Pedro Abad Santos. Two years later, he created and headed the Aguman ding Maldang Talapagobra (AMT). The Abad Santos compound in Barangay San Jose became the focal point of the peasant movement.

On February 14, 1939, Philippine president Manuel L. Quezon proclaimed his social justice program before a gathering of farmers in front of the Municipal Government building.

=== World War II ===
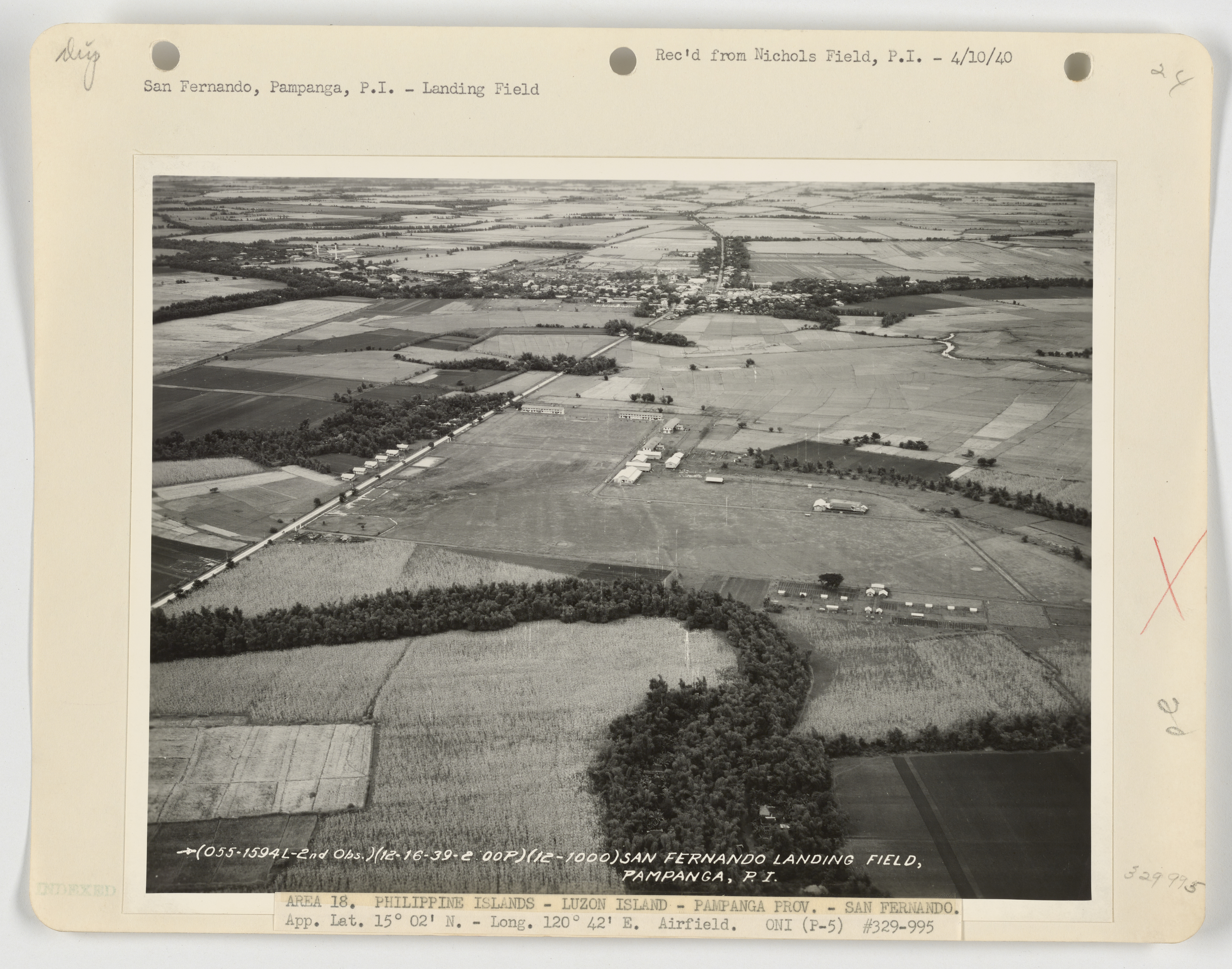
Aerial view of San Fernando, circa 1940s

In 1941, forces of the Imperial Japanese Army occupied the town and placed the municipal government under its supervision. The following year, thousands of Filipino and American prisoners of war walked from Bataan to the San Fernando Train Station in what will be known as the Bataan Death March.

On January 29, 1945, the forces of under General Douglas Mac Arthur retook San Fernando and established the Civil Government. Vivencio Cuyugan was made Municipal Mayor, and he was replaced by Rodolfo Hizon in July, 1946, after the war.

=== Postwar era ===
After having been destroyed in a fire in 1939, the Metropolitan Cathedral of San Fernando was restored by Kapampangan architect Fernando H. Ocampo in 1948, at which point it was elevated to Cathedral when it became the seat of the Diocese of San Fernando, canonically created by Pope Pius XII. In 1975, the diocese was elevated by Pope Paul VI, to Archdiocese of San Fernando.

In 1952, the town of Santo Tomas was separated from San Fernando.

=== Martial law era ===
Upon the declaration of martial law in September 1972, Camp Olivas in the City of San Fernando was designated as one of the four provincial camps to become a Regional Command for Detainees (RECAD). It was designated RECAD I and it housed detainees from Northern and Central Luzon. Prominent detainees imprisoned there include Edicio de la Torre, Judy Taguiwalo, Tina Pargas, Marie Hilao-Enriquez, and Bernard-Adan Ebuen. Prisoners who were documented to have been tortured include the sisters Joanna and Josefina Cariño, the brothers Romulo and Armando Palabay, and Mariano Giner Jr of Abra. About 50 Kalinga and Bontoc leaders, including Butbut tribe leader Macli-ing Dulag, were also brought to Camp Olivas from their detainment center in Tabuk, Kalinga, arrested for their opposition to the Chico River Dam Project. Seminarian Teresito Sison had campaigned for the rights of teachers, farmers, and of laborers in Clark Air Base, but torture during two stints in Marcos' detention centers caused a decline in his health which led to his death in 1980.

Jose B. Lingad, congressman for Pampanga's 1st congressional district, had been one of the first to be detained upon the declaration of martial law, but was released after three months. He retired to his farm after that, but was later convinced by Benigno Aquino Jr. to run for the governorship of Pampanga in the January 1980 Philippine local elections. Lingad lost the election to the Marcos administration's candidate, but filed a protest, which was still ongoing on December 16, 1980 when he was shot dead while sitting alone in the driver's seat of his car at a gasoline station in barangay San Agustin, San Fernando, Pampanga. His assassin, a former sergeant in the Philippine Constabulary, was himself killed in a mysterious car accident before he could reveal who had ordered the killing.

In 1986, Paterno Guevarra was sworn in as officer-in-charge of the town after the successful People Power Revolution that toppled the Marcos dictatorship that same year. He was later elected municipal mayor. On December 31, 1987, former mayor Armando Biliwang was campaigning in Barangay San Jose to be elected mayor again when communist insurgents from the New People's Army fired gunshots in his direction, narrowly avoiding getting killed while his nephew was fatally wounded.

=== Later 20th Century ===
In 1990, Philippine president Corazon Aquino inaugurated the Paskuhan Village, the first Christmas village in Asia and the third of its kind in the world. The following year, Mount Pinatubo erupted after over 600 years of dormancy hurling a layer of ash and volcanic debris on the town.

On October 1, 1995, Typhoon Sibyl (Mameng) struck the town. It unleashed floodwaters and mudflows from Mount Pinatubo into the town. The Barangays of Santo Nino, San Juan, San Pedro Cutud and Magliman were severely damaged by lahar. The citizens of San Fernando rallied to save the town by raising funds to build the St. Ferdinand People's Dike. The Pampanga Megadike was constructed the following year, thus preventing further damage to the town.

=== Cityhood ===
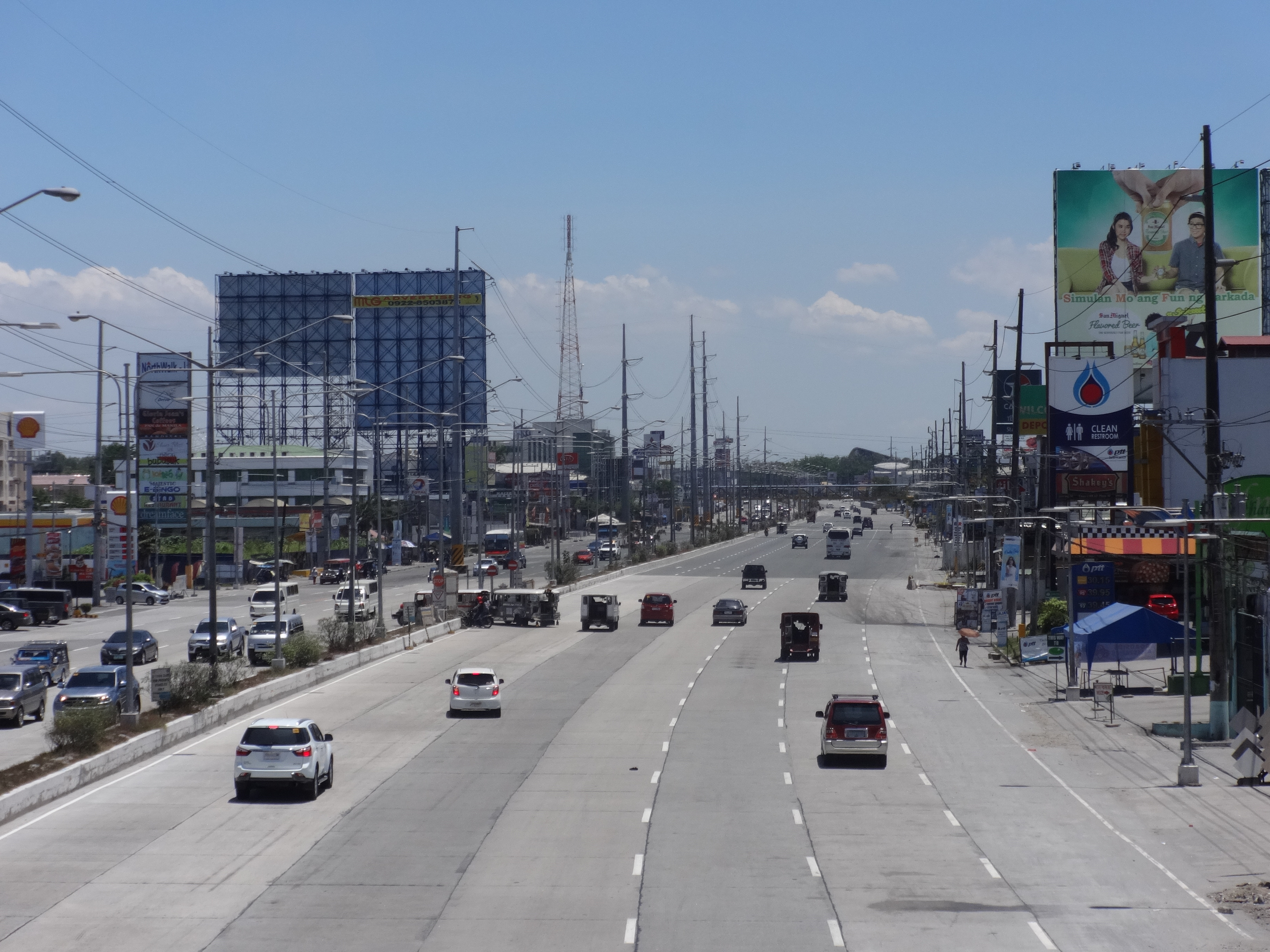
Jose Abad Santos Avenue

On January 6, 1997, Mayor Rey Aquino and Senator Gloria Macapagal Arroyo launched the campaign for cityhood. On April 27 of that same year, Rep. Oscar Rodriguez filed House Bill No. 9267 creating the City of San Fernando.

In 2000, House Speaker Arnulfo Fuentebella and Senate President Aquilino Pimentel Jr. signed the approved city charter of San Fernando on December 4 and 13 respectively.

The town officially became a component city on February 4, 2001, following the ratification of Republic Act 8990 in a plebiscite from the previous day, making it the 99th city in the Philippines. Rey Aquino was the city's first mayor.

On the morning of April 30, 2022, Barangay Alasas chairman and PDP-Laban city council candidate Alvin C. Mendoza was driving through Brgy. Magliman with his family in an SUV heading to his party's headquarters during the 2022 local election when he was shot sixteen times by motorcycle-riding gunmen. After the incident, his wife Rosalie ran in his stead as "Alvin Mendoza" and won the second-highest number of votes among candidates for councilor. In his investigation, Lubao, Pampanga police executive Ceazar Dalay regarded a gun-for-hire group leader with the alias Jason Alvarez as a suspect in the assassination.

== Geography ==
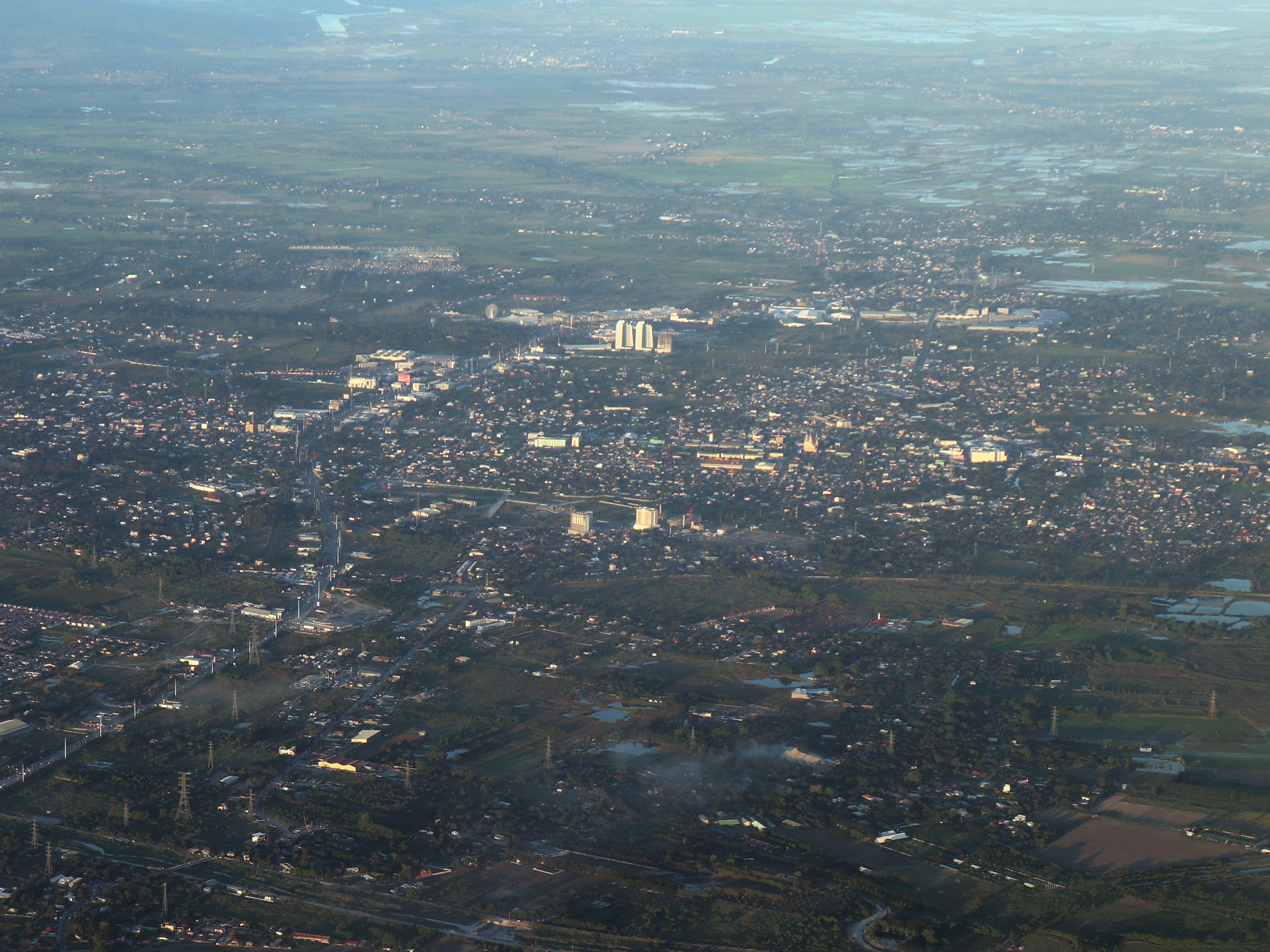
Aerial view of San Fernando, Pampanga in 2023

It is the provincial capital of Pampanga and regional center of Central Luzon, and located 66 kilometres (41 mi) north of Manila, 72 kilometres (45 mi) east of Subic in Zambales, 58 kilometres (36 mi) south of Tarlac City in Tarlac, and 17 kilometres (11 mi) south of Clark Air Base in Angeles City. The city is in the urban core of Metro Clark, also known as Metro Angeles, an urban area in Pampanga. This area is considered the industrial and residential heartland of Central Luzon.

=== Barangays ===
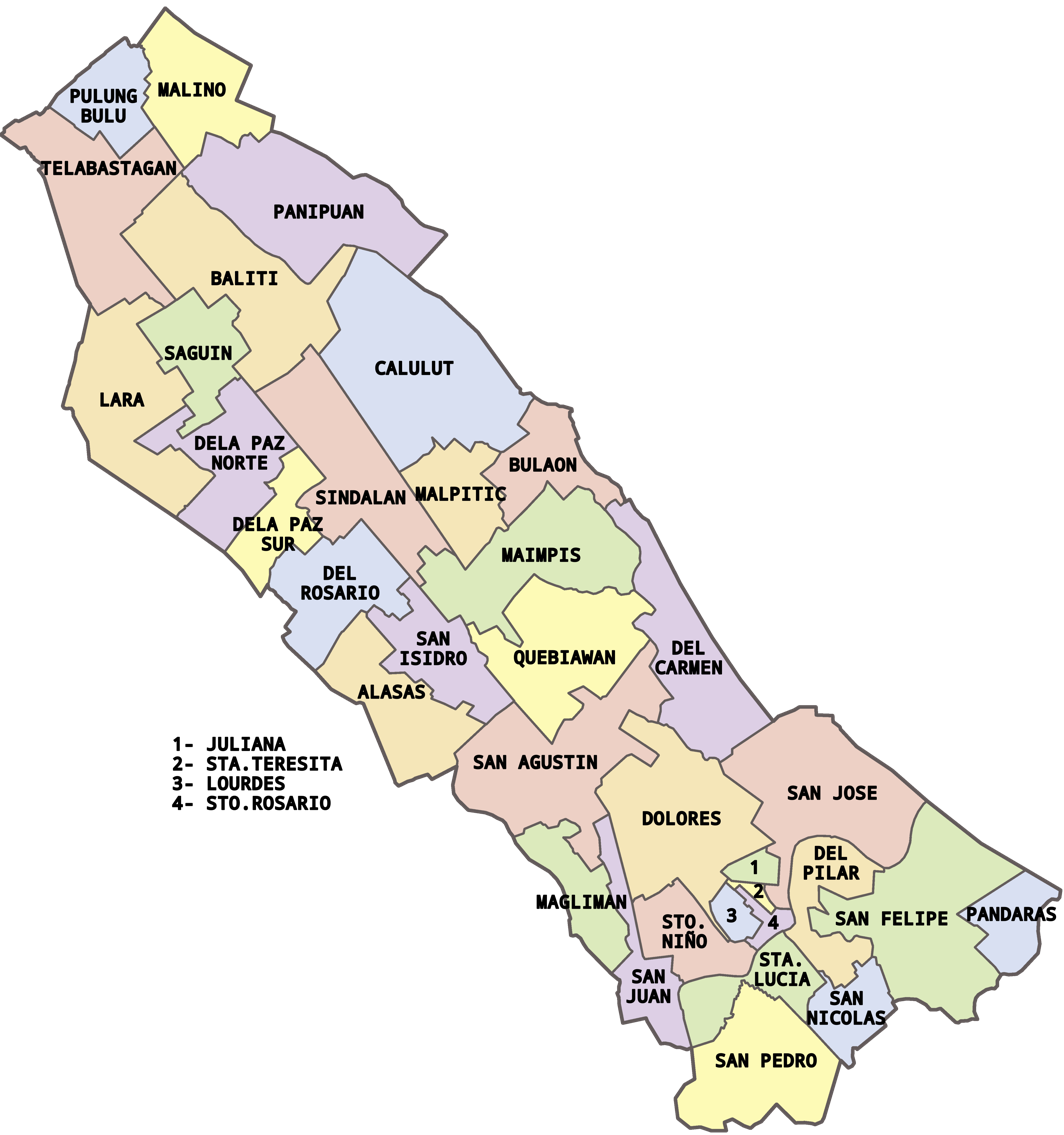
Political Subdivisions of the City of San Fernando

San Fernando is politically subdivided into 35 barangays, as shown below. Each barangay consists of puroks and some have sitios.

- Alasas
- Baliti
- Bulaon
- Calulut
- Del Carmen
- Del Pilar
- Del Rosario
- Dela Paz Norte
- Dela Paz Sur
- Dolores
- Juliana
- Lara
- Lourdes
- Magliman
- Maimpis
- Malino
- Malpitic
- Pandaras
- Panipuan
- Pulung Bulo
- Quebiawan
- Saguin
- San Agustin
- San Felipe
- San Isidro
- San Jose
- San Nicolas
- San Pedro
- San Juan
- Santa Lucia
- Santa Teresita
- Santo Niño
- Santo Rosario
- Sindalan
- Telabastagan

=== Climate ===
Climate data for City of San Fernando, Pampanga
Month	Jan	Feb	Mar	Apr	May	Jun	Jul	Aug	Sep	Oct	Nov	Dec	Year
Mean daily maximum °C (°F)	30 (86)	31 (88)	33 (91)	34 (93)	33 (91)	31 (88)	29 (84)	29 (84)	29 (84)	30 (86)	31 (88)	30 (86)	31 (87)
Mean daily minimum °C (°F)	19 (66)	20 (68)	21 (70)	23 (73)	25 (77)	25 (77)	25 (77)	25 (77)	24 (75)	23 (73)	22 (72)	20 (68)	23 (73)
Average precipitation mm (inches)	8 (0.3)	9 (0.4)	15 (0.6)	34 (1.3)	138 (5.4)	203 (8.0)	242 (9.5)	233 (9.2)	201 (7.9)	126 (5.0)	50 (2.0)	21 (0.8)	1,280 (50.4)
Average rainy days	3.7	4.1	6.5	11.2	21.2	24.9	27.7	26.5	25.5	21.8	12.6	5.6	191.3
Source: Meteoblue

== Demographics ==
Population census of San Fernando

Year	Pop.	±% p.a.
1903	13,556	—
1918	20,622	+2.84%
1939	35,662	+2.64%
1948	39,549	+1.16%
1960	56,861	+3.07%
1970	84,362	+4.02%

Year	Pop.	±% p.a.
1975	98,382	+3.13%
1980	110,891	+2.42%
1990	157,851	+3.59%
1995	193,025	+3.84%
2000	221,857	+3.03%
2007	269,365	+2.71%

Year	Pop.	±% p.a.
2010	285,912	+2.19%
2015	306,659	+1.34%
2020	354,666	+3.11%
2024	377,534	+1.51%

Source: Philippine Statistics Authority

=== Religions ===
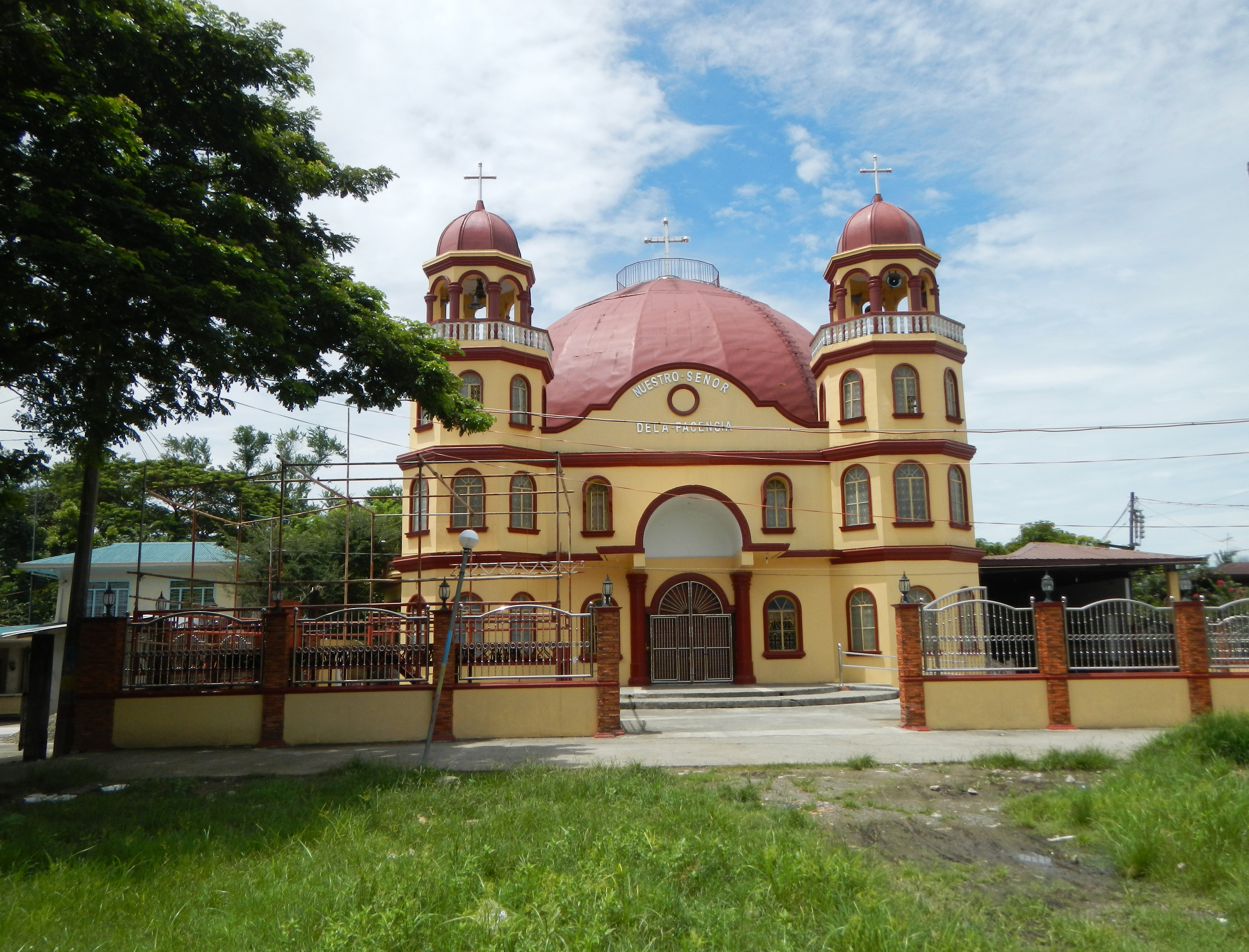
Nuestro Señor de la Pacencia Chapel, part of the local barangay hall

The Roman Catholicism is the majority religion in the city; 80% of the population profess it. The city is under the Roman Catholic Archdiocese of San Fernando headed by Archbishop Florentino Lavarias since October 27, 2014. Other religion includes Protestantism and Independent Christianity.The Iglesia Ni Cristo is the largest minority with 4-5% adherence. Islam is also evident in the city. The seat of the Archdiocese of San Fernando is located in the city, the Metropolitan Cathedral of San Fernando.

== Economy ==
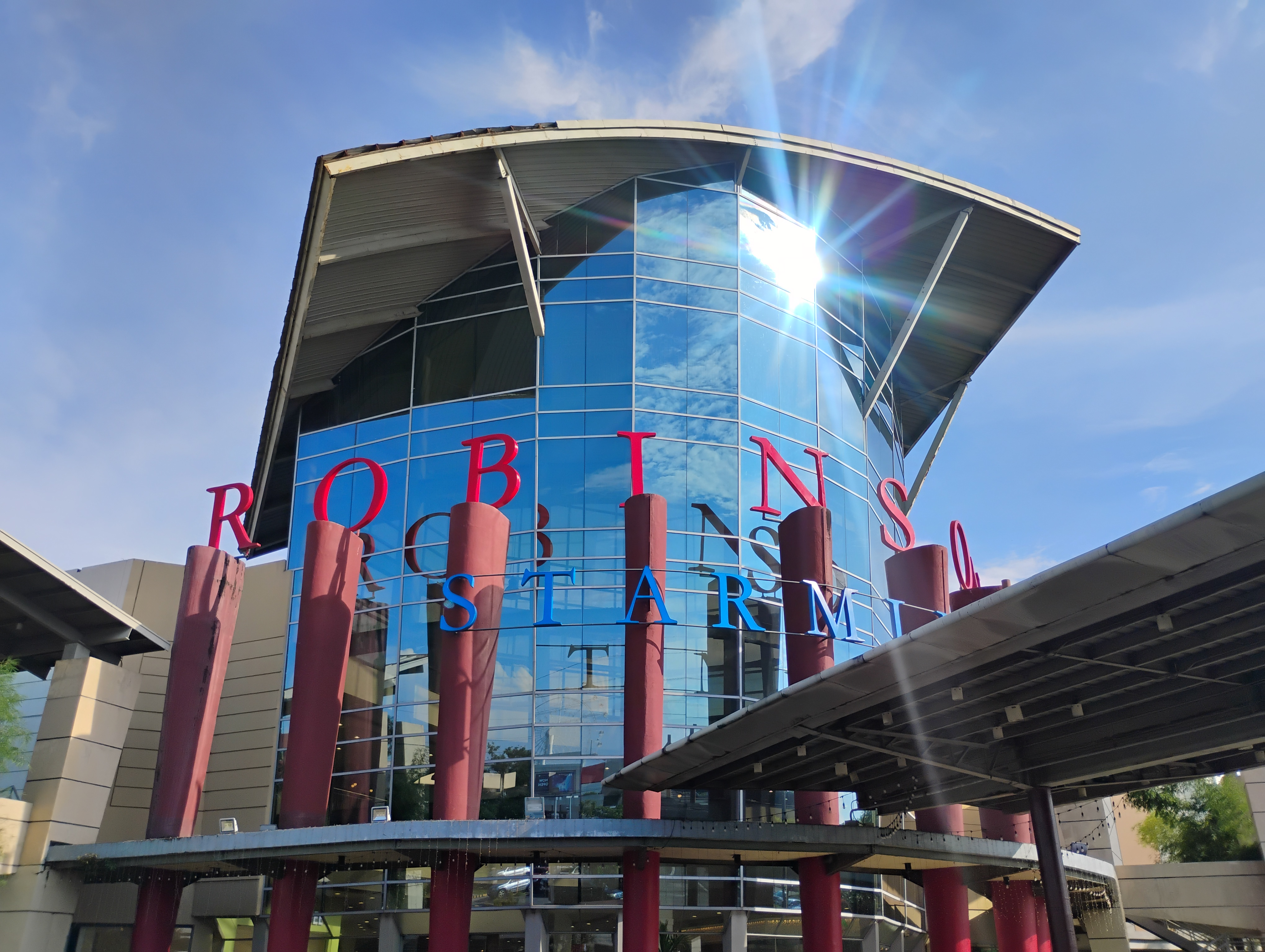
Robinsons Starmills Pampanga in San Fernando City

Poverty incidence of San Fernando (%)

Source: Philippine Statistics Authority

Being at the heart of the province, the city of San Fernando is home to 2 public markets, 39 banks, 48 lending institutions (investors), 38 pawnshops, 17 gasoline stations, 3 cinemas, 39 public and private schools, 7 hospitals, 13 dental offices, 9 hotels, 28 drug stores, 7 discos, 6 foreign exchange firms, 15 garment factories, 24 groceries, 7 supermarkets, 42 insurance companies, 16 security agencies and 70 restaurants. As the provincial capital of Pampanga, San Fernando also hosts regional offices of major Philippine government offices. SM City Pampanga, the first SM mall in Central Luzon, is a large shopping mall owned by SM Supermalls. SM also has two other malls: SM City San Fernando Downtown, along Consunji Street in the downtown; and SM City Telabastagan, along MacArthur Highway in barangay Telabastagan. Robinsons Starmills Pampanga or Robinsons Starmills, is a shopping mall owned and operated by Robinsons Malls, the second-largest mall operator in the Philippines. This is the first Robinsons mall in Central Luzon and in Pampanga, and it rivals SM City Pampanga. The mall is along Jose Abad Santos Avenue, at the boundary of San Fernando with the municipality of Mexico, and has a total floor area of 62,000 square meters (670,000 sq ft). Beside these malls is the Azure North Residences with majestic Monaco, Bali and Barbados Towers, a gateway of Century Properties along Gapan–San Fernando–Olongapo Road (JASA) in Barangay San Jose.

=== Industries ===
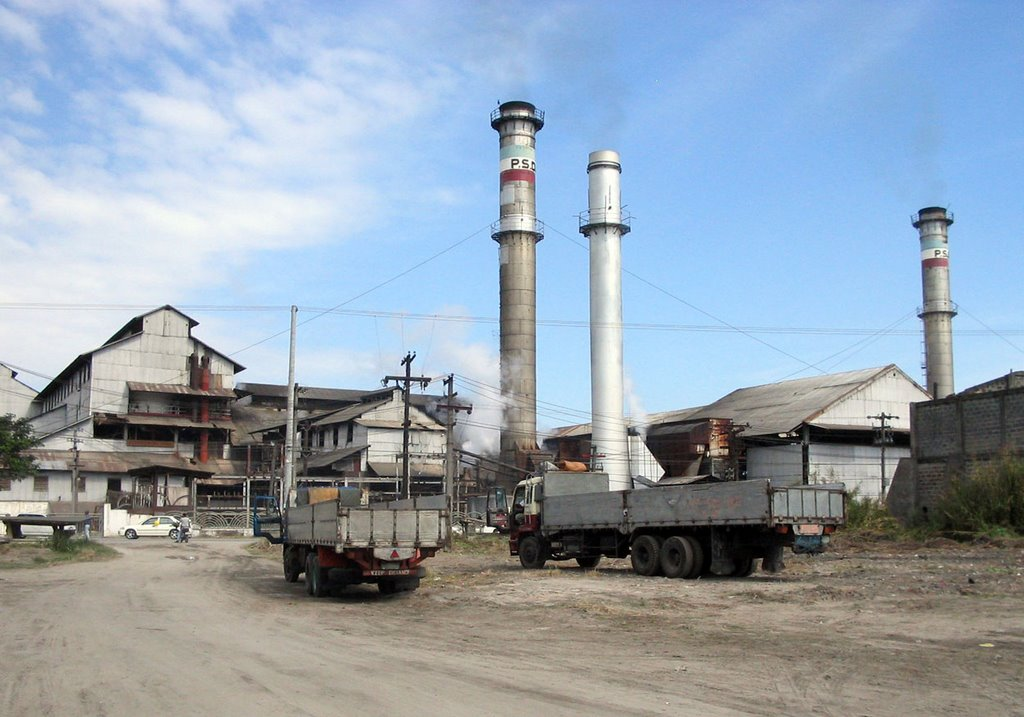
PASUDECO Sugar Central

San Fernando serves as one of the agricultural processing centers of Central Luzon. It is a major rice-producing region and an important sugar-producing area. The Pampanga Sugar Development Company (PASUDECO) was once the largest private employer in Pampanga. It is a major sugar-processing plant in the region. Other manufacturing companies with offices in the city include Universal Robina, Zuellig Pharma, Nestlé Philippines, Petrophil, Mondragon Industries, JBTEC Flavors and Blends Inc. Asia Brewery, and Del Monte Corporation. Major food and beverage companies such as San Miguel Corporation, Coca-Cola, Pepsi Cola, and Pampanga's Best, have factories in the city.

Every year during Christmas season, the city becomes the center of production of hand-made parols, which is different from the usual ones for its intricate designs and the illusion of dancing lights, emphasizing the lanterns' vibrant colors. Also, every year around Christmas time is the Giant Parol Festival, where barangays of San Fernando come together for a friendly competition to see which lanterns are the best. The festival itself is held in the middle of December, and was originally held in the town of Bacolor until it was transferred to the city in August 1904. This took place in an event called the Ligligan Parol in the Kapampangan language, which many believe to have never happened in that year.

Following the formal transfer of the festival to the city in 1908, the Giant Parol Festival went on to be a tradition that has evolved with lanterns becoming larger and larger and the designs more intricate. Since then, it became a symbol of the city's unity and the resident's labor.

== Tourism ==
=== Festivals and local events ===
Date	Name
January 31	Pedro Abad Santos Day
February 4	Cityhood Anniversary
Good Friday	San Pedro Cutud Lenten Rites
May 7	José Abad Santos Day
First Saturday of May	El Circulo Fernandino
May 30	San Fernando City Fiesta
September 10	San Fernando Women's Day
Around October to November	San Fernando Frog Festival (Kapampangan: Piestang Tugac)
Around November to December	Sinukwan Festival
December 11	Pampanga Day (Kapampangan: Aldo ning Kapampangan)
December to First Week of January	Giant Lantern Festival (Kapampangan: Ligligan Parul)

=== Places of interest ===
Monumento Fernandino

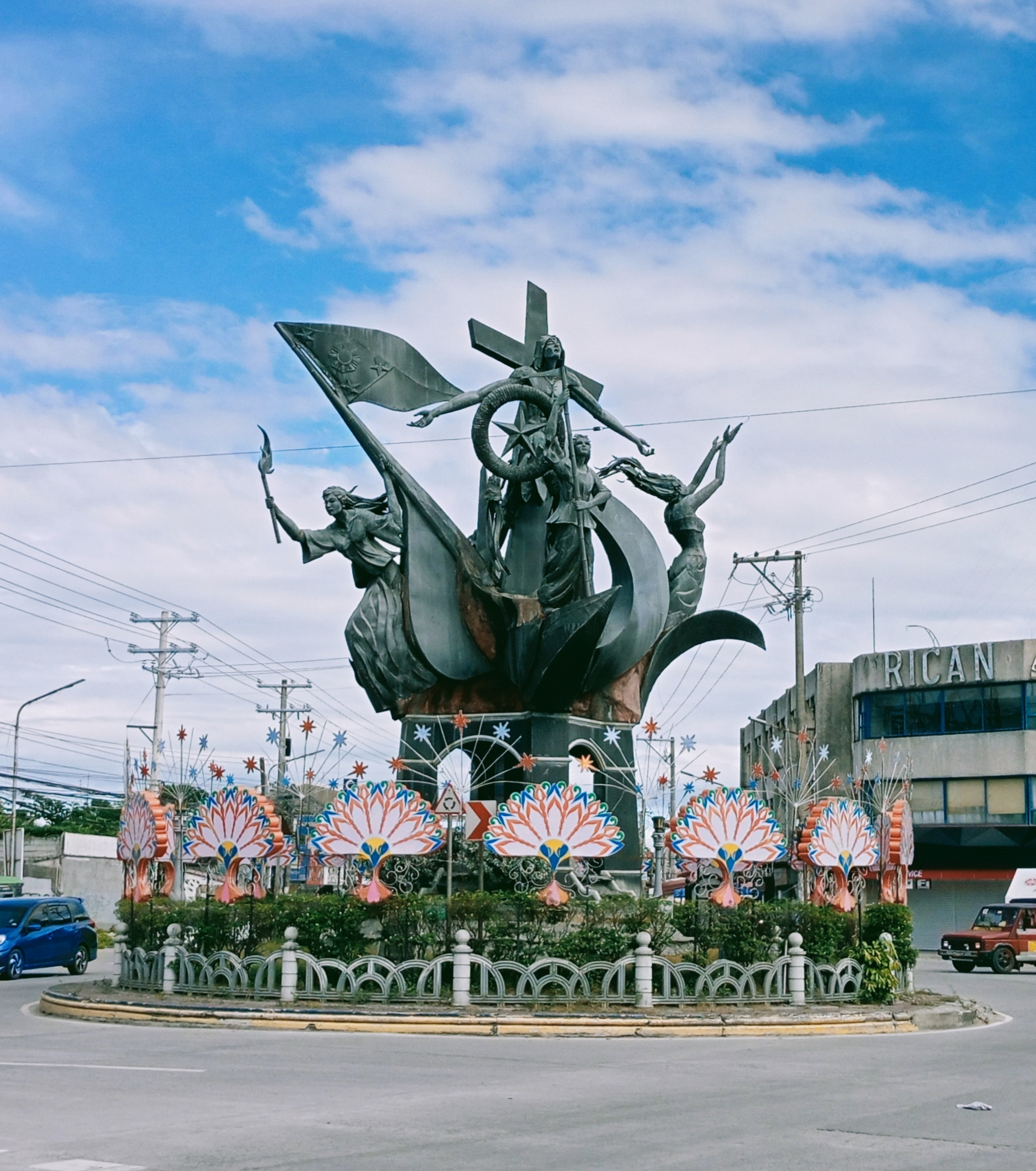
Monumento Fernandino

The monument tells the fourfold aspect of the Fernandino story: a) the penitent girl with lantern, b) the lady with torch, c) the lady making the offering and d) the boatman. The February 4, 2004 (dedicated by Mayor Rey B. Aquino) Monumento Fernandino is a sculpture that pays tribute to the city's colorful history and cultural heritage. Its artistic composition when seen from a distance would seem like a sprouting plant amidst a barren landscape.

WOW Philippines Hilaga
Formerly known as Paskuhan Village, located near the San Fernando exit of North Luzon Expressway (NLEX), WOW Philippines Hilaga was transformed into a cultural, historical, tourism, trade, and entertainment village by former Secretary Richard J. Gordon in 2003. Its design and concept make it a virtual window to the cultural and historical heritage of the four regions of the North Philippines as well as a showcase for their indigenous products, and arts and crafts. The star-shaped pavilions at the center pays tribute to the skilled lantern makers of San Fernando, Pampanga which produces the biggest lanterns in the world. The complex features a 1,000-seat capacity air-conditioned pavilion for conventions and special events, an open-air amphitheater for outdoor activities, air-conditioned exhibit halls, trade booths, garden restos and a 60-seat capacity conference hall.

Pampanga Eye
Located in Sky Ranch Pampanga beside SM City Pampanga, this Ferris wheel is the tallest in the country with a height of 65 meters (213 ft) height and a diameter of 50 meters (160 ft).

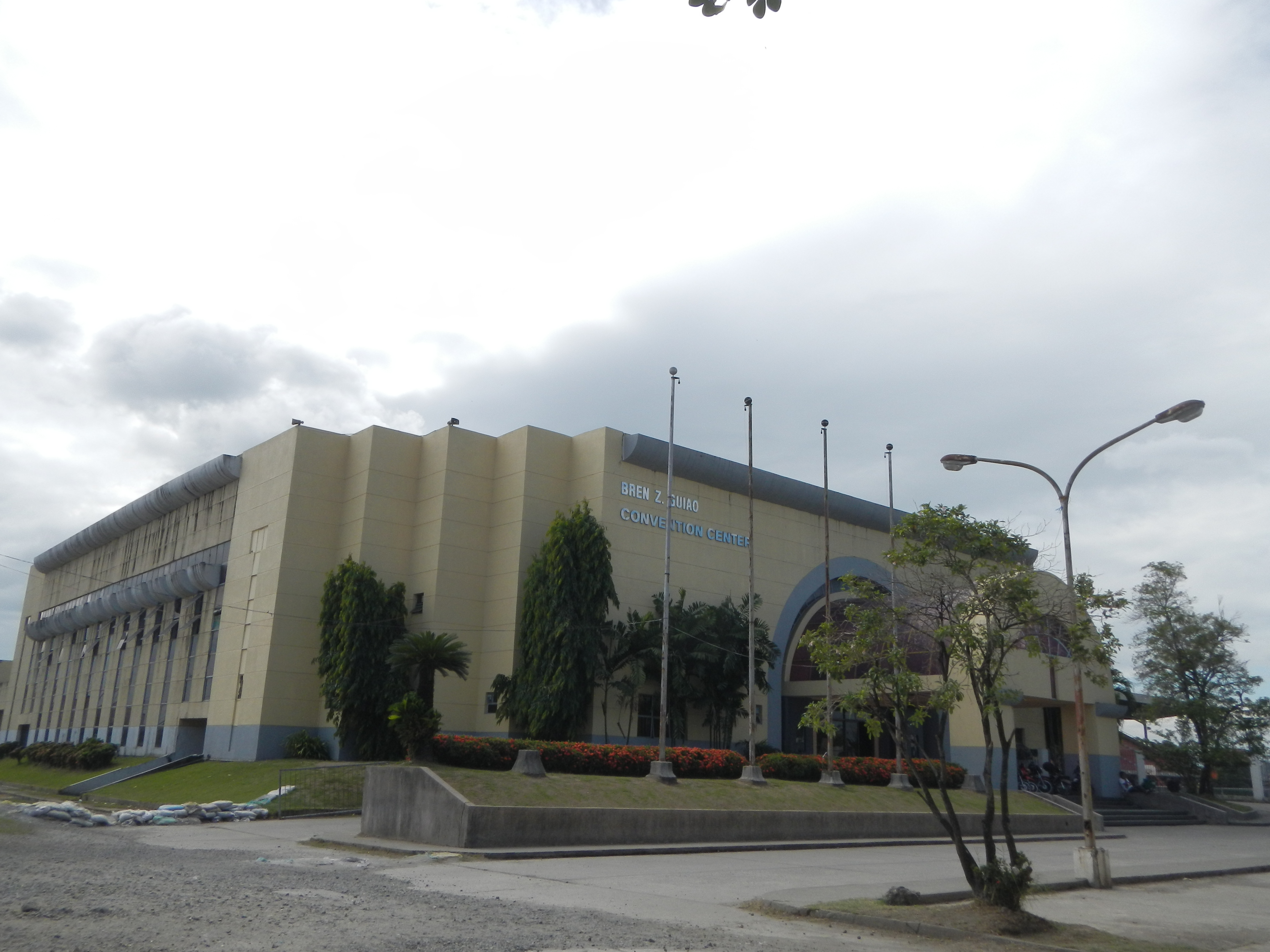
Bren Z. Guiao Sports Complex and Convention Center

Bren Z. Guiao Sports Complex and Convention Center
It is a multi-purpose complex with imposing venues for concerts, convention, basketball games, beauty pageants and other sport activities. The 3,000-seat, air-conditioned convention center inside the complex is one of Pampanga's pride.

Archdiocesan Museum and Archives
It is housed at the University of the Assumption, and includes antiques and exquisite works of art depicting Pampanga's rich cultural heritage. It contains numerous ecclesiastical artifacts ranging from a huge churchbell to paintings; ivory and wooden statues of all shapes and sizes, vestments worn by priests during Mass and chalices, monstrances, reliquaries and ciboriums made of gold, silver and precious gems, some dating back to the 17th century.

Everybody's Cafe
As the province of Pampanga is regarded as the "Culinary Capital of the Philippines", the capital city of San Fernando is home to one of the oldest restaurants in the province - Everybody's Cafe. Located along McArthur Highway in Barangay Del Pilar, this iconic restaurant was built in 1946 by the Jorolan Family and is famous for exotic Kapampangan dishes such as betute (stuffed frogs), kamaru (crickets) and Pindang Damulag (carabao meat). Everybody's Cafe has been featured in international TV shows such as Discovery Travel and Living's Bizarre Foods by Andrew Zimmern and Bobby Chin's World Cafe Asia.

==== San Fernando Heritage District ====
The San Fernando Heritage District covers the historic core of San Fernando, including barangay Santo Rosario and parts of barangays San Jose (Panlumacan), Santa Teresita (Baritan), Lourdes (Teopaco), Del Pilar, Santa Lucia and Santo Niño. These important sites are broken down under Heritage Houses, Historic Government Buildings, Schools, and Hospitals, and Historic Industrial Structures and Sites

Churches and other religious structures:

- Metropolitan Cathedral of San Fernando (in barangay Santo Rosario)
- Church of San Vicente Ferrer (in barangay Calulut)
- Virgen de los Remedios Church (Barangay Baliti)
- Jeosay Shinhongkong Temple (Barangay San Jose)

Heritage houses:

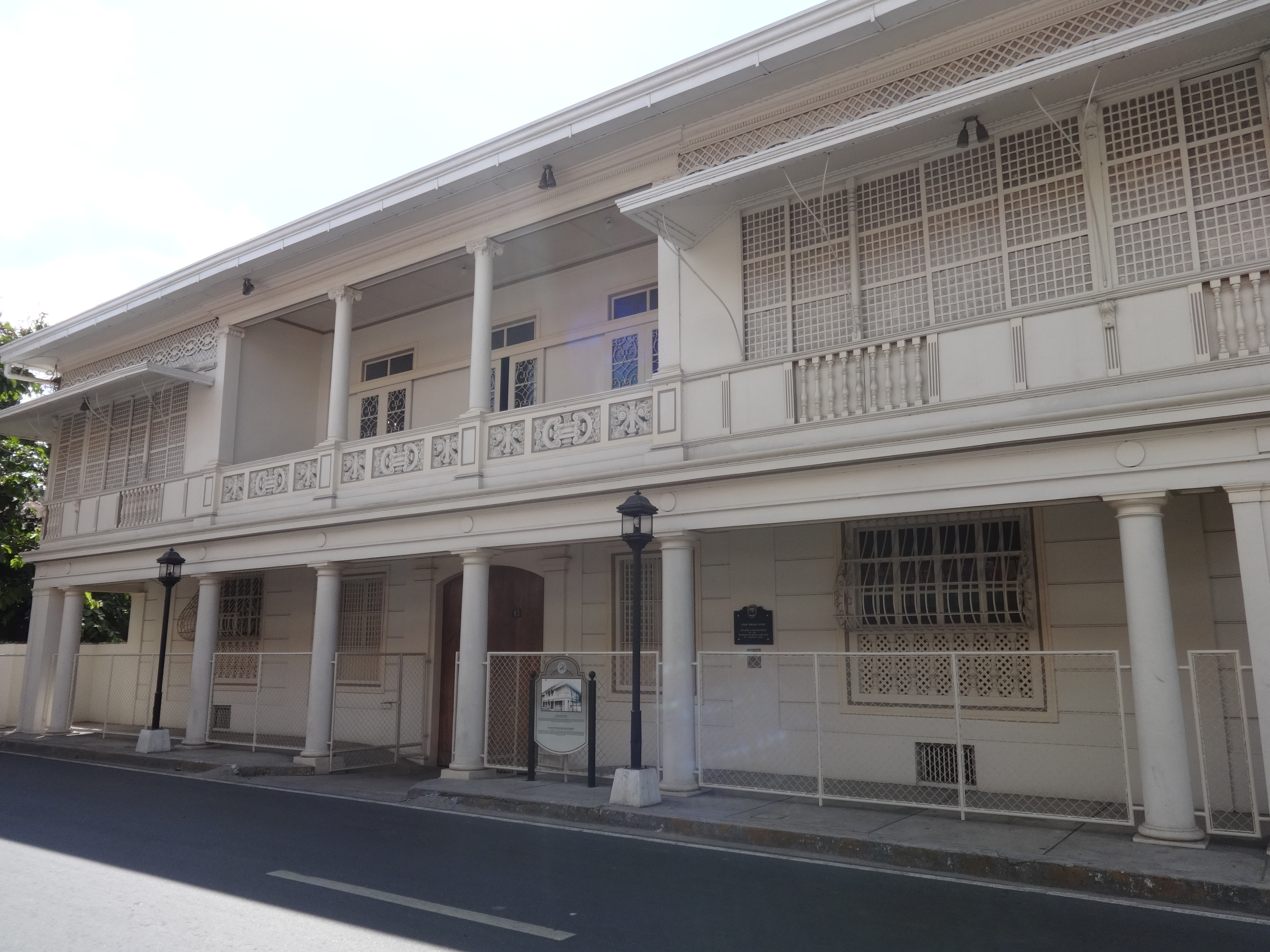
Hizon-Singian House

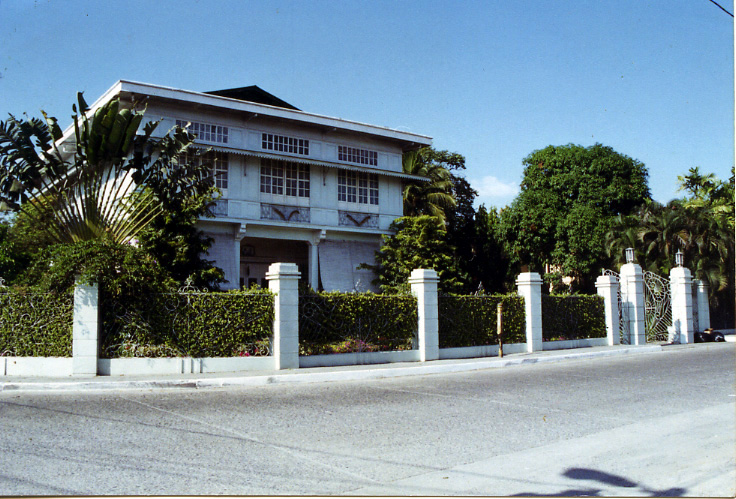
Lazatin House

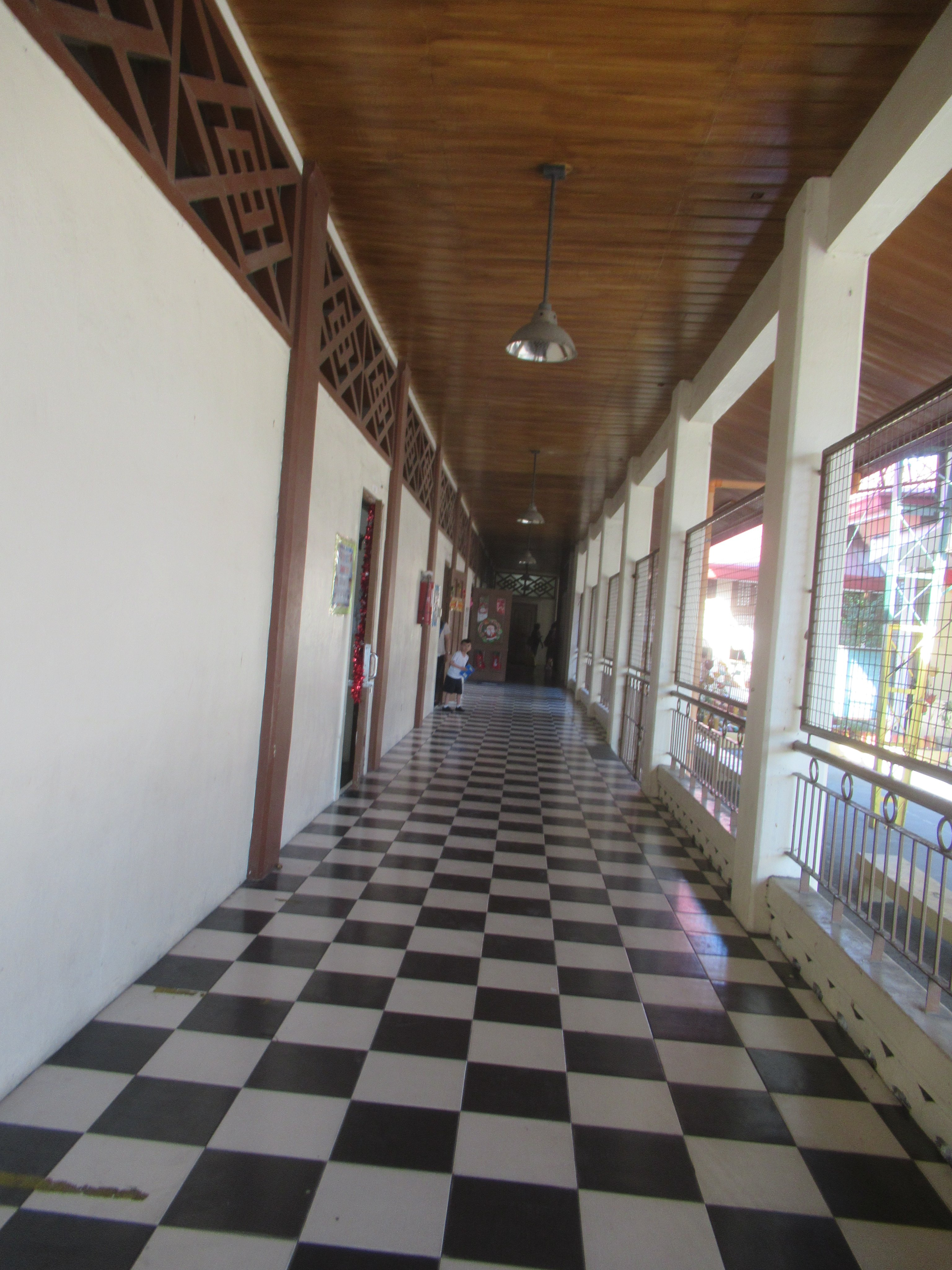
San Fernando, Pampanga Elementary School

- Hizon-Singian House (A. Consunji Street, Barangay Santo Rosario)
- Henson-Hizon House (V. Tiomico Street, Barangay Santo Rosario)
- Lazatin House (A. Consunji Street, Barangay Santo Rosario)
- Dayrit-Cuyugan House (MacArthur Highway, Barangay Dolores)
- Consunji House (A. Consunji Street, Barangay Santo Rosario)
- Tabacalera House (A. Consunji Street, Barangay Santo Rosario)
- Hizon-Ocampo House (A. Consunji Street, Barangay Santo Rosario)
- Santos-Hizon House (A. Consunji Street, Barangay Santo Rosario)
- Angel Y. Datu-Jovita Y. Bundalian House (Barangay Lourdes)
- Pampanga Hotel (A. Consunji Street, Barangay Santo Rosario)
- Archdiocesan Chancery (A. Consunji Street, Barangay San Jose)

Historic government buildings, schools, and hospitals:

- City Hall of San Fernando (A. Consunji Street, Barangay Santo Rosario)
- Pampanga Provincial Capitol (Capitol Boulevard, Barangay Santo Niño)
- Presidio (Artemio Macalino Street, Barangay Santo Niño)
- Provincial High School Building (Capitol Boulevard, Barangay Santo Niño)
- Pampanga High School Building (High School Boulevard, Barangay Lourdes)
- San Fernando Elementary School (B. Mendoza Street, Barangay Santo Rosario)
- Old St. Scholastica's Academy (Pedro Abad Santos Road, Barangay Santa Teresita)
- Jose B. Lingad Memorial Regional Hospital (formerly Pampanga Provincial Hospital) (Barangay Dolores)
- Virgen de los Remedios Hospital (A. Consunji Street, Barangay San Jose)

Industrial heritage:

- San Fernando Train Station (Barangay Santo Niño)
- PASUDECO Sugar Central (Capitol Boulevard, Barangay Santo Niño)
- PASUDECO Staff Houses and Commissary (Capitol Boulevard, Barangay Santo Niño)
  - Capital Town - a 35.6 hectares (88 acres) township development in San Fernando, standing in a land formerly owned by the (PASUDECO) featuring the 17-story Saint-Marcel Residences, with 361 "smart home" units - Chelsea Parkplace condominium named after Chelsea, New York
- San Fernando Water Reservoir (Barangay Lourdes)
- The Sugar Pugons (Greenville Subdivision and Barangay Quebiawan)
- Calulut Train Station (Barangay Calulut)
- Baluyut Bridge (Gen. Hizon Avenue, Barangay Santo Rosario)
- The Arcaded Shop Buildings of Consunji Street - 1950s (Barangay Santo Rosario)
- Lantern Factories - Several lantern factories can be visited in Unisite Subdivision, Barangay Del Pilar, as well as in Barangays Santa Lucia, San Jose and Dolores.

== Government ==
=== Elected officials ===
Members of the San Fernando, Pampanga Council (2025–2028)
Position	Name
District Representative (3rd Legislative District of the Province of Pampanga)	Alyssa Michaela M. Gonzales
Chief Executive of the City of San Fernando, Pampanga	Vilma B. Caluag
Presiding Officer of the City Council of San Fernando, Pampanga	Aurelio Brenz P. Gonzales
Members of the City Council	Noel T. Tulabut
Members of the City Council	Reginaldo B. David
Members of the City Council	Harvey A. Quiwa
Members of the City Council	Celestino S. Dizon
Members of the City Council	Raquel L. Pineda
Members of the City Council	Angelo D. Hizon Jr.
Members of the City Council	Jesus P. Cuyugan
Members of the City Council	Mark Joseph C. Carreon
Members of the City Council	Jayson C. Sicat
Members of the City Council	Elmer M. Bengco

== Education ==
=== Colleges and universities ===
- AMA Computer College
- Central Luzon College of Science and Technology (CELTECH College)
- City College of San Fernando, Pampanga
- College of Our Lady of Mt. Carmel (Pampanga)
- Far Eastern University Pampanga (formerly Colegio De Sebastian - Pampanga, Inc.)
- New Era University - Pampanga
- Pampanga State University - San Fernando Campus
- Republic Central Colleges - Baliti Campus
- Our Lady of Fatima University, San Fernando
- STI College
- St. Nicolas College of Business and Technology
- University of the Assumption

=== Vocational / Technical Schools ===
- TESDA PEO Training Center
- La Plata Science and Technology, Inc.
- Lorraine Computer & Technical School
- NorthPoint Academy for Culinary Arts - premiere culinary school in Pampanga
- Emmanual John Institute Of Science and Technology
- Gateways Institute of Science and Technology

=== Secondary schools ===
- Saguin Integrated School
- Information and Communication Technology High School
- San Vicente Pilot School for Philippine Craftsmen
- Saint Vincent of Quebiawan Integrated School
- Panipuan Integrated School
- Baliti Integrated School
- Telabastagan Integrated School
- Del Carmen Integrated School
- Del Rosario Integrated School
- Magliman Integrated School
- Malpitic Integrated School
- Maimpis Integrated School
- Calulut Integrated School
- City of San Fernando West Integrated School
- Santa Lucia Integrated School
- St. Scholastica's Academy, San Fernando
- San Lorenzo Ruiz Center of Studies and Schools
- San Isidro Integrated School
- University of the Assumption
- Pampanga High School
- Pandaras Integrated School
- Proverbsville School Inc.
- Sindalan National High School
- Potrero National High School
- Christ in You Faith Christian Academy
- Sure Values School Inc.
- Academy of Our Lady of Fatima
- Santa Barbara College of San Fernando
- Infant Jesus Academy
- Mother of Good Counsel Seminary
- Lyndale Academy
- The Magnificat Academy
- Northville 14 High School
- Nasah Montessori Center for Learning, Inc.
- Bright Ways School Systems Inc.

== Media ==
San Fernando has four TV stations - UBC Channel 12, Infomax Channel 44, Central Luzon Television Channel 36 High Definition (CLTV36 HD), and ABS-CBN's TV-46 Pampanga (DWIN-TV). There are three radio stations, the 5 Kilowatt RW 95.1 FM of the RadioWorld Broadcasting Corporation of the Philippines, 91.9 Bright FM, owned and Operated by Archdiocese of San Fernando and the 2.5 kilowatt 92.7 Brigada News FM Central Luzon of the Brigada Mass Media Corporation.

== Television ==
- (ABS-CBN Sa ALLTV2) (Analog: Channel 3 and Digital Channel 34)
- (RPN/RPTV) (Analog: Channel 6 and Digital Channel 19/ Channel 18)
- (PTV 4 Pampanga) (Analog: Channel 4 and Digital Channel 14 / Channel 42)
- (GMA Pampanga) (Analog: Channel 10 and Digital Channel 38 / Channel 15)
- (GTV Pampanga) (Analog: Channel 27 and Digital Channel 38 / Channel 15)
- Ka-Brigada TV (UBC Global Media Ministries Inc.) (Analog Channel 12)
- (IBC 13 Pampanga (Analog: Channel 13 and Digital Channel 17)
- (ZOE Broadcasting Network/ABS-CBN Corporation/A2Z Pampanga) (Digital Channel 20)
- (Light TV Pampanga) (Digital Channel 33)
- (SBN 21 Pampanga/SolarFlix) (Digital Channel 21)
- (Solar Sports) (Digital Channel 21)
- (Aliw 23 Pampanga) (Digital: Channel 23)
- (TV5 Pampanga) (Analog: Channel 24 and Digital: Channel 18)
- (Net 25) (Digital Channel 28)
- (RJ DigiTV 29 Pampanga) (Digital Channel 29)
- (BEAM DTV 31 Pampanga) (Digital Channel 31)
- (CLTV 36 HD) (Digital Channel 36)
- (One Sports) (Analog: Channel 41 and Digital Channel 18)
- (UNTV) (Digital: Channel 37)
- (GNN TV 44 Pampanga/DWFU-DTV) (Digital: Channel 44)
- (INC TV Pampanga) (Digital Channel 49)
- (DepEd TV Pampanga) (Digital Channel 52.7)

=== Newspaper ===
Several local newspapers are published in the city which includes SunStar Pampanga, The Probe, Coffee Punch, Pampanga Times and the Observer.

== Notable personalities ==
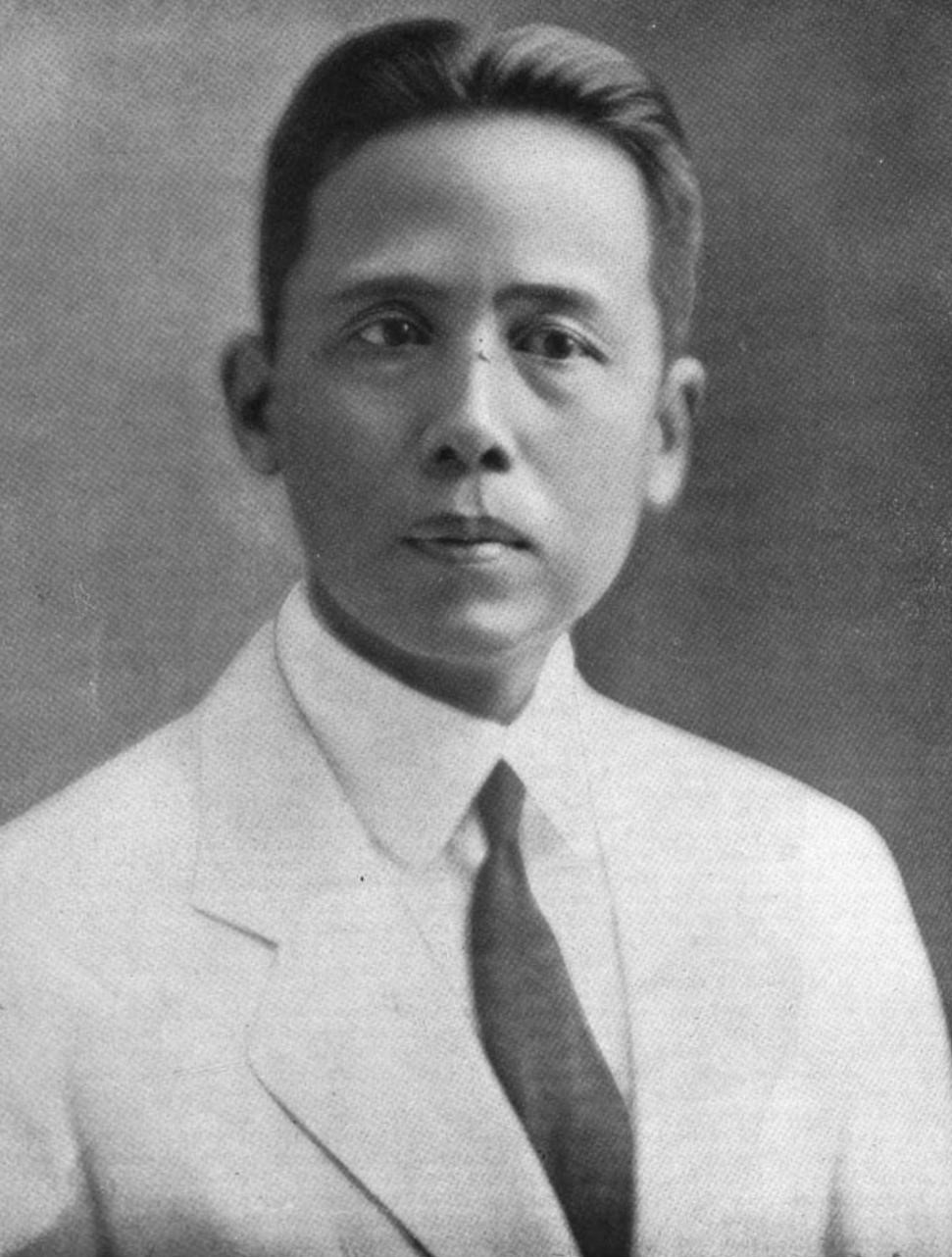
José Abad Santos, was the fifth chief justice of the Supreme Court of the Philippines

- José Abad Santos, a former Chief Justice
- Nicolasa Dayrit, a revolutionary hero
- Pedro Abad Santos, a former assemblyman and founder of the Aguman ding Talapagobra ning Pilipinas
- Amando G. Dayrit, a pre-war newspaper columnist
- Vivencio Cuyugan, first Socialist mayor in the Philippines
- Fernando H. Ocampo, a founder of the UST College of Architecture and Fine Arts
- Zoilo Hilario, poet, playwright, lawmaker and linguist.
- Vicente Abad Santos, 39th Secretary of the Department of Justice, 96th Associate Justice of the Supreme Court of the Philippines
- Sotero Baluyut, a former senator and cabinet secretary
- Emerita Quito, philosopher known as the Grande Dame of Filipino Philosophy
- Honesto Ongtioco, second Bishop of Balanga in Bataan (June 18, 1998 – August 28, 2003) and Bishop of Cubao, Quezon City (August 28, 2003 – December 3, 2024), and sede vacante Apostolic Administrator of Malolos covering the province of Bulacan and city of Valenzuela in Metro Manila (May 11, 2018 – August 21, 2019).
- Ruben Enaje, notable Filipino man made famous from crucifying himself in the name of God every year since 1985
- Oscar Albayalde, Police officer who serves as the 22nd chief of the Philippine National Police.
- Brillante Mendoza, award-winning film director
- Oscar Samson Rodriguez, a former congressman and former mayor

== Sister cities ==
- (Philippines) Angeles City
- (Philippines) Mabalacat
