= Pampanga Hotel =

Heritage house in Pampanga, Philippines

Coordinates: 15°01′40″N 120°41′35″E

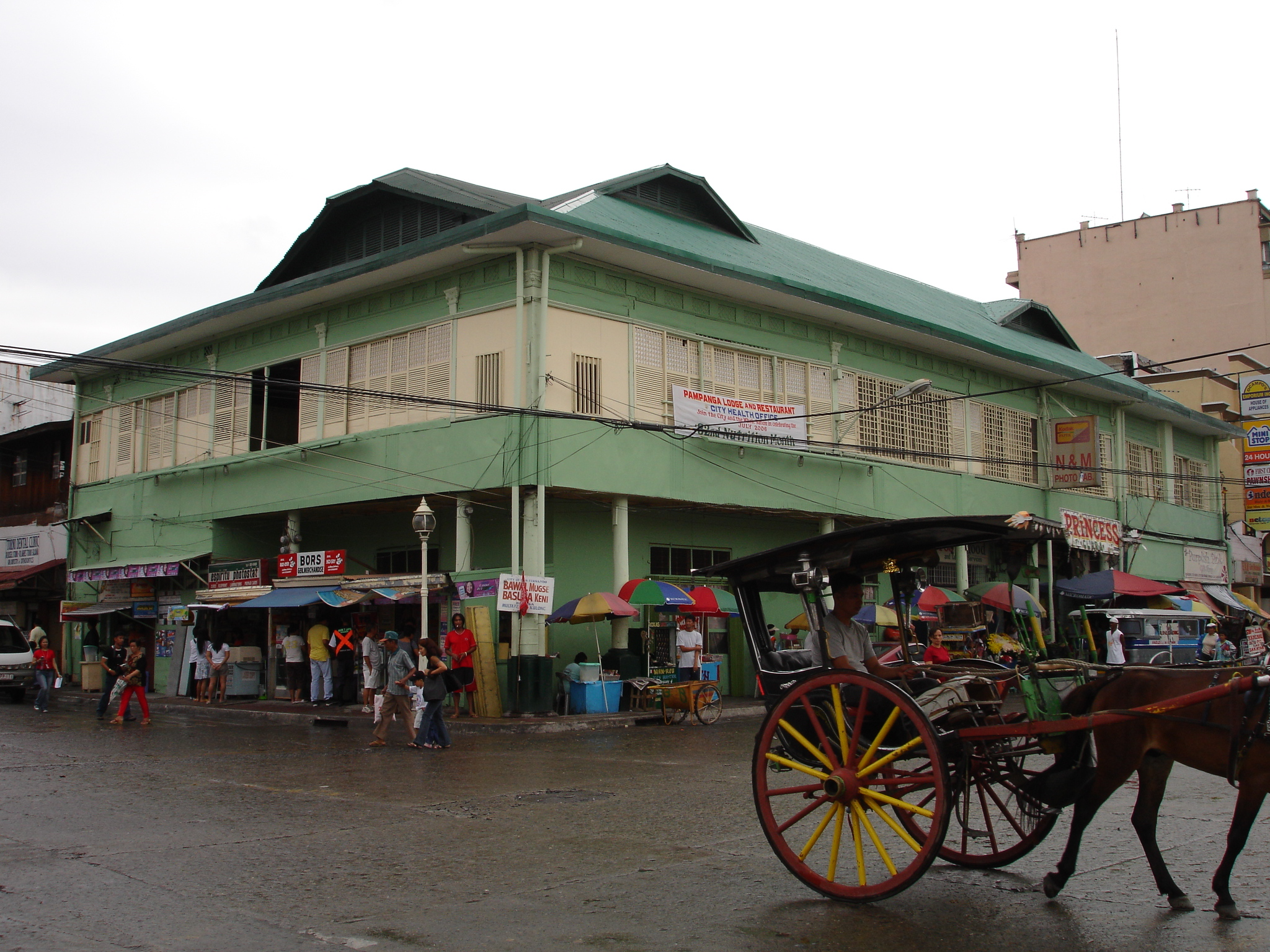
Pampanga Hotel

The Pampanga Hotel is a heritage house in the City of San Fernando, Pampanga in the Philippines.

The building was originally the residence of Asuncion Santos, a daughter of Don Teodoro Santos, Sr. (Dorong Tola), who married Andres Eusebio. It later became the first site of the Pampanga High School. The building later became the site of the Harvardian College, then the Pampanga Hotel and Panciteria. It is now the Pampanga Lodge and Restaurant.

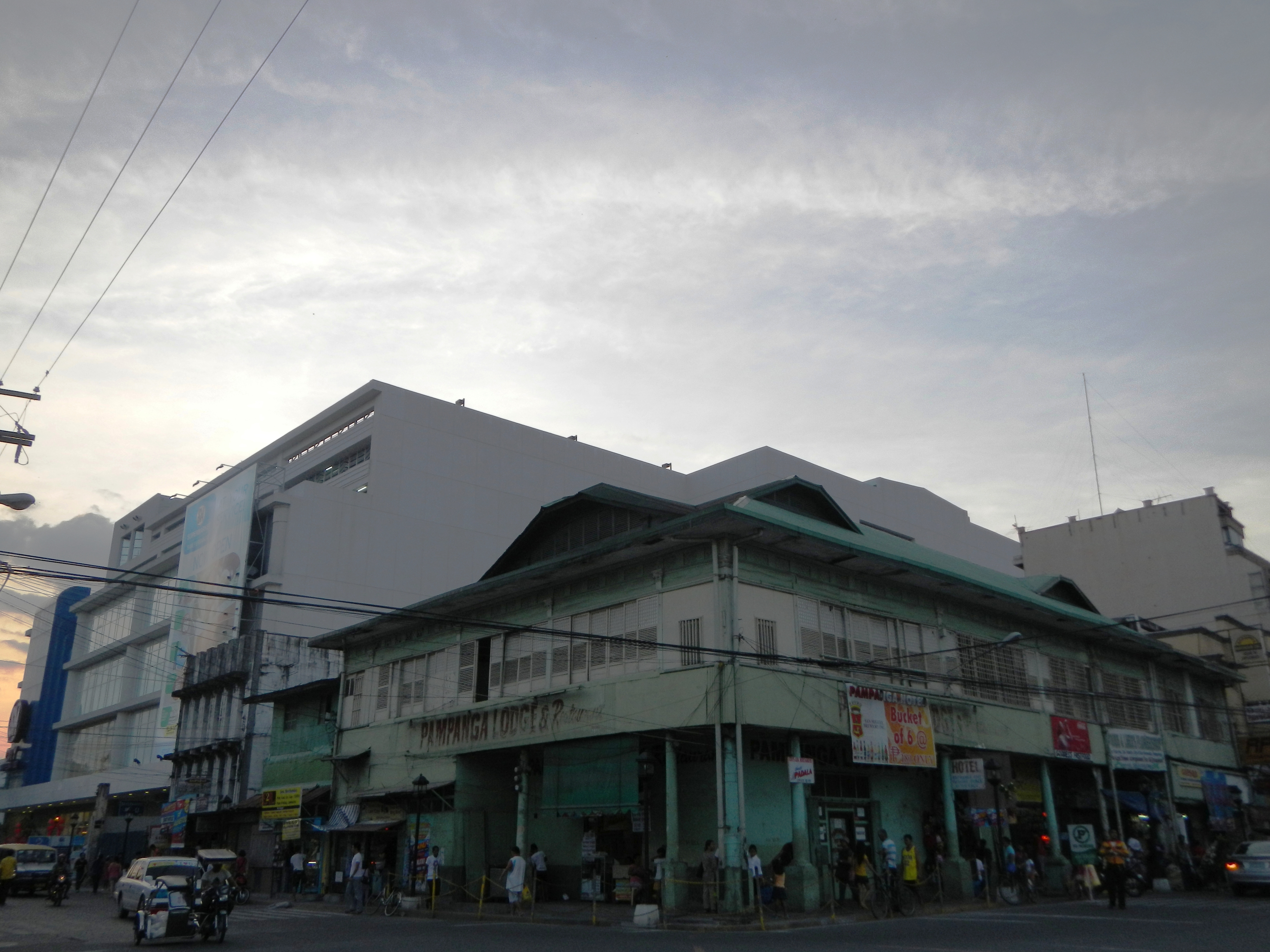
Pampanga Hotel (dusk portrait, 2012)

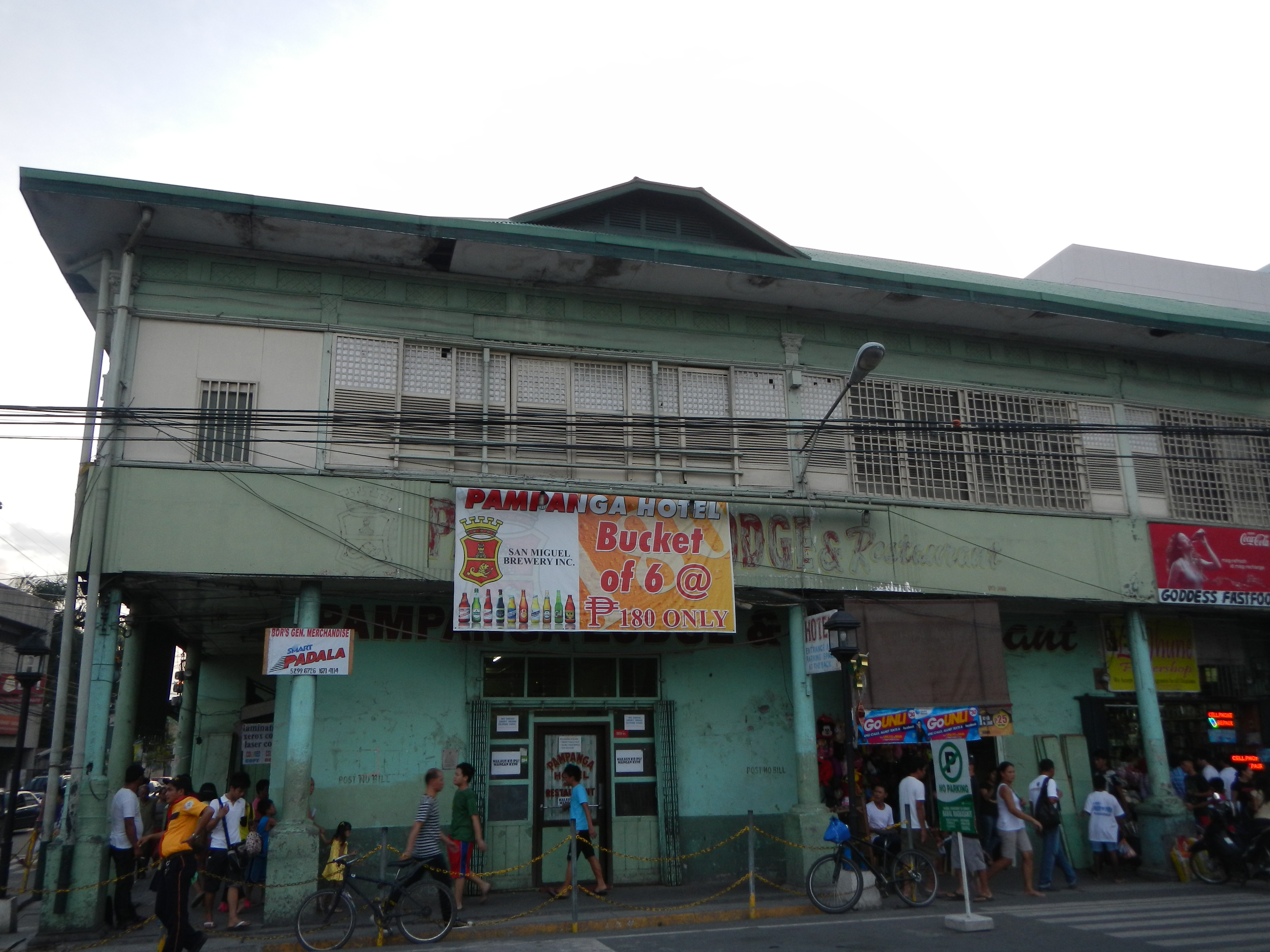
Façade of the Hotel

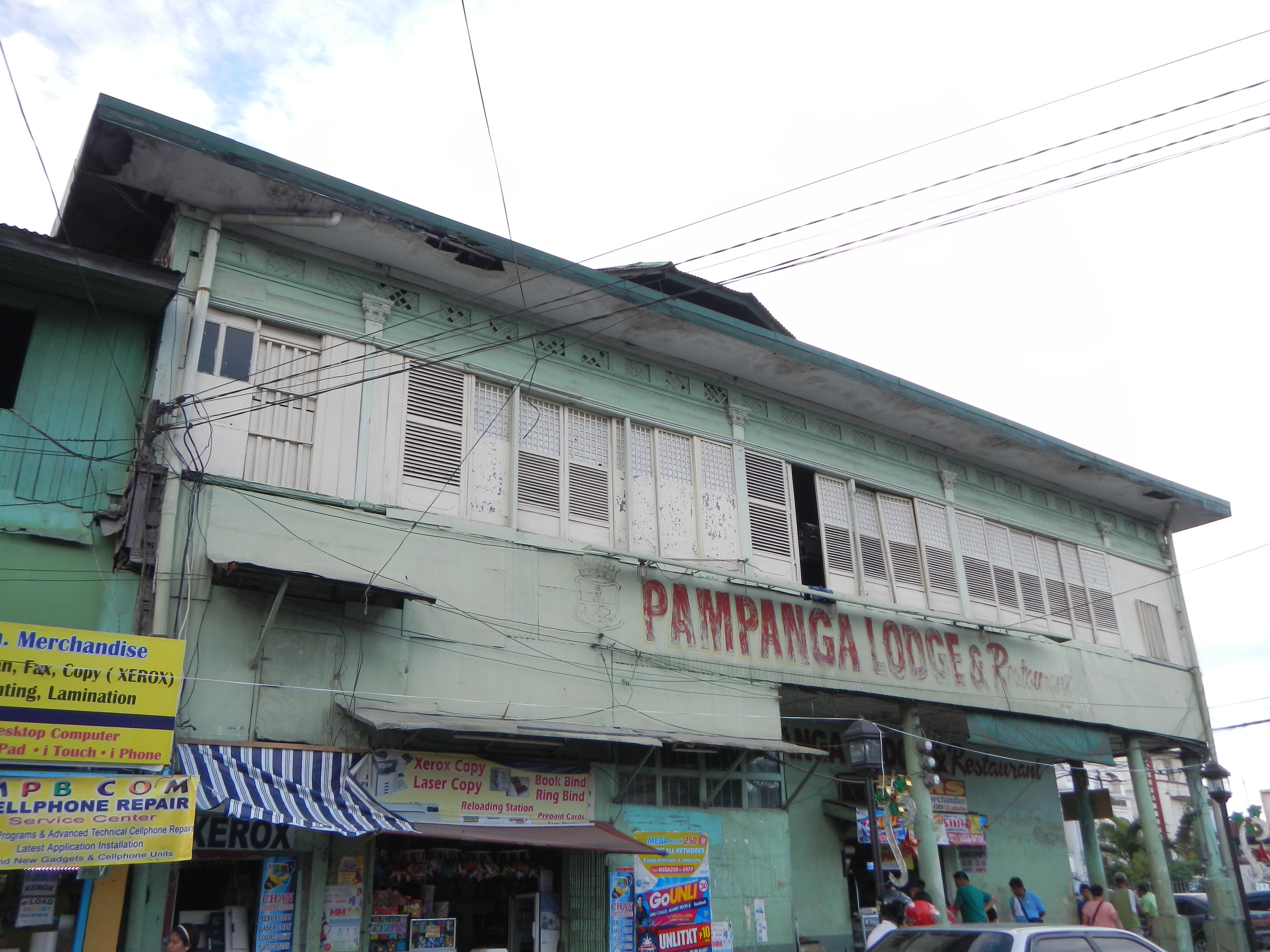
View of the hotel beside SM San Fernando

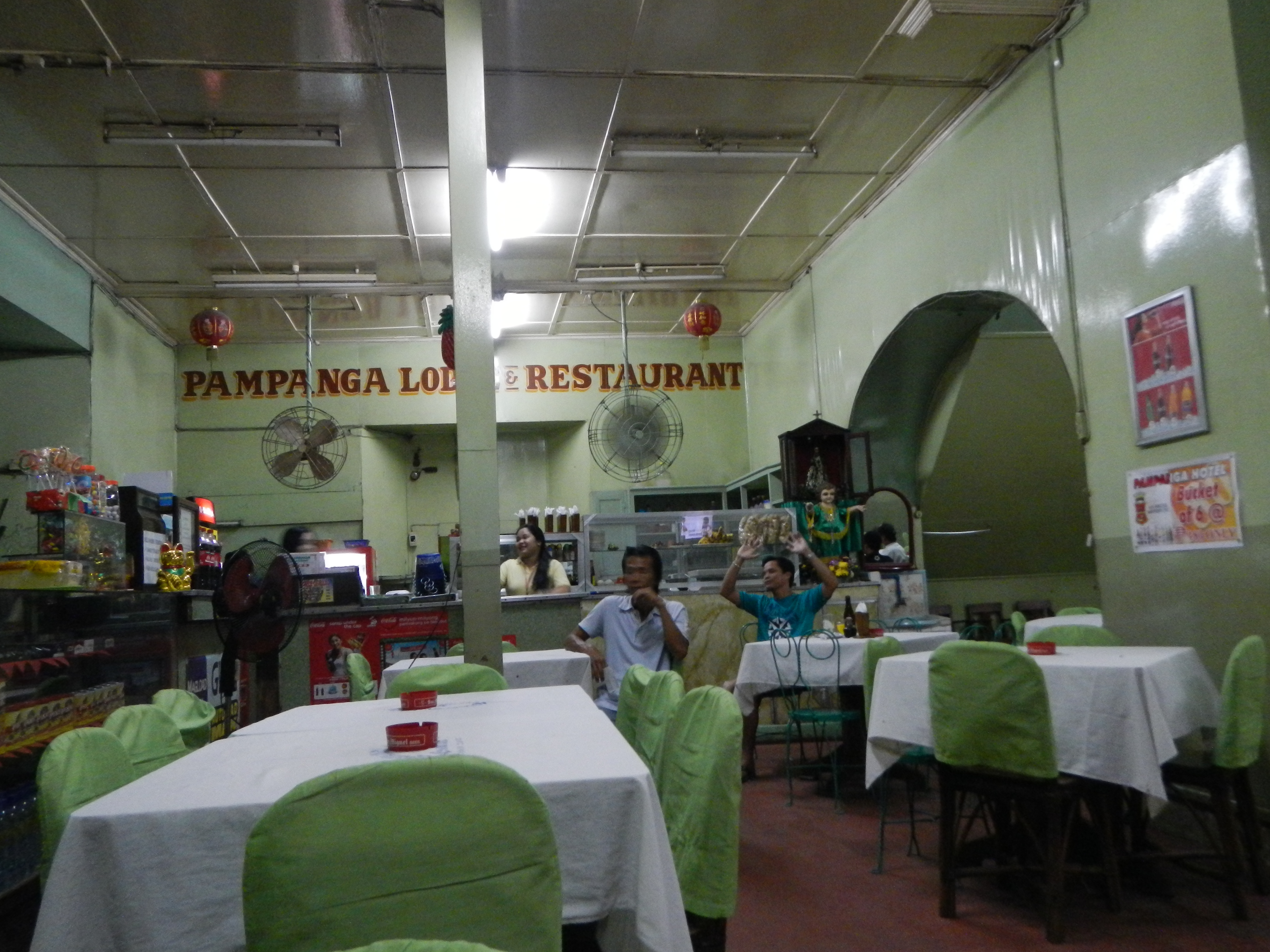
The present restaurant of the Hotel, ground floor

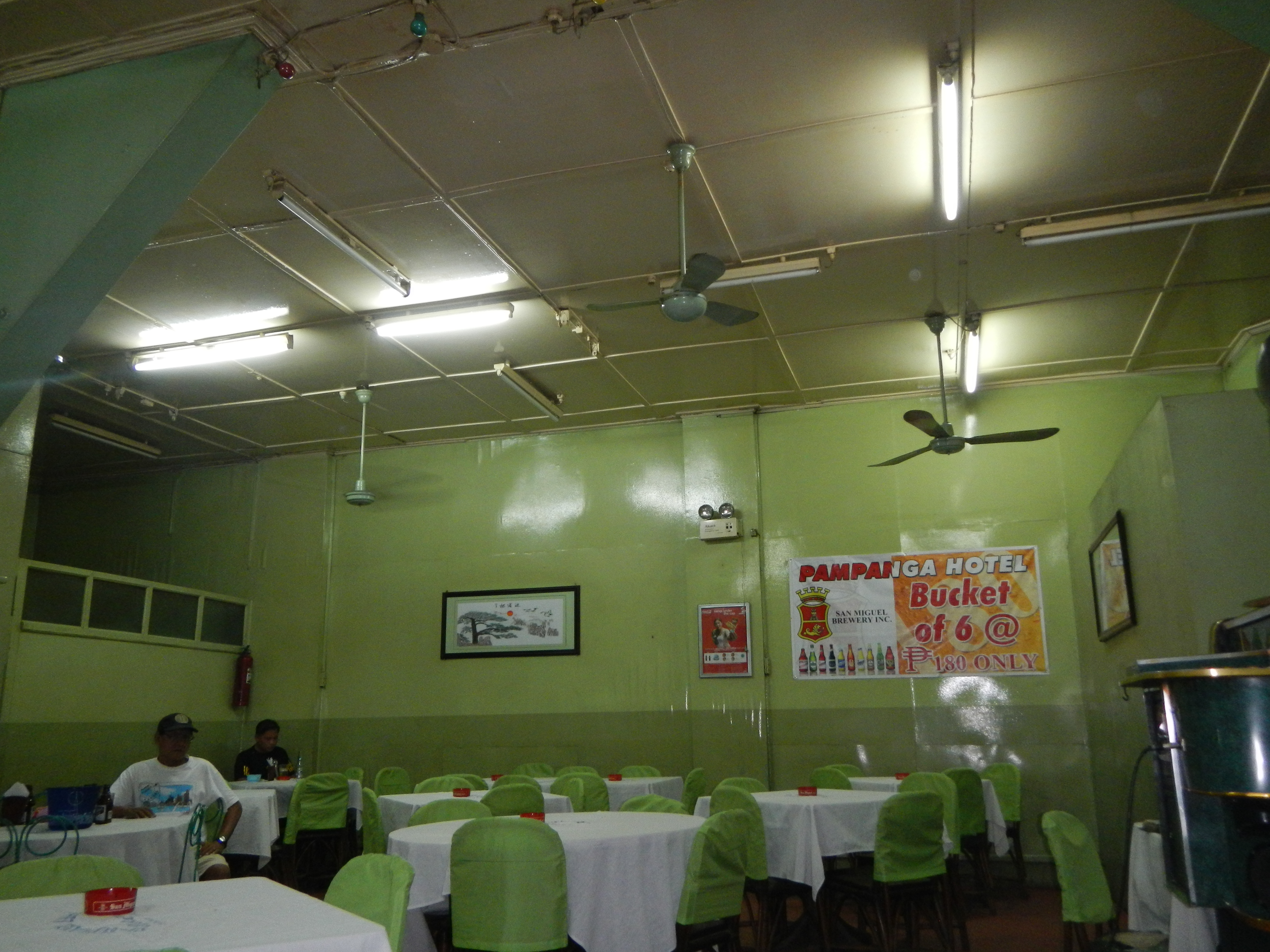
The dining area is now a Karaoke food and drinks section

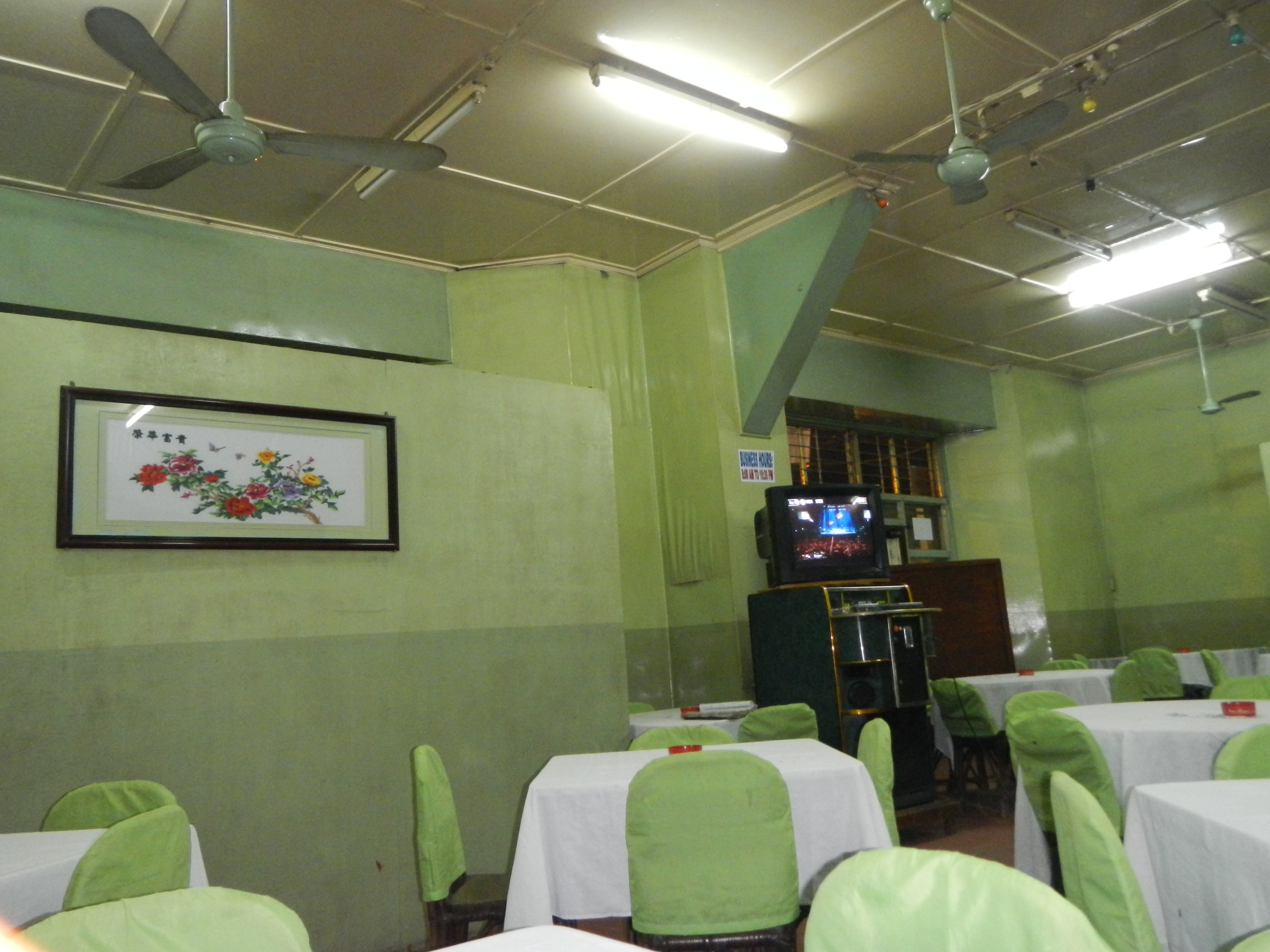
Some of the chairs and tables

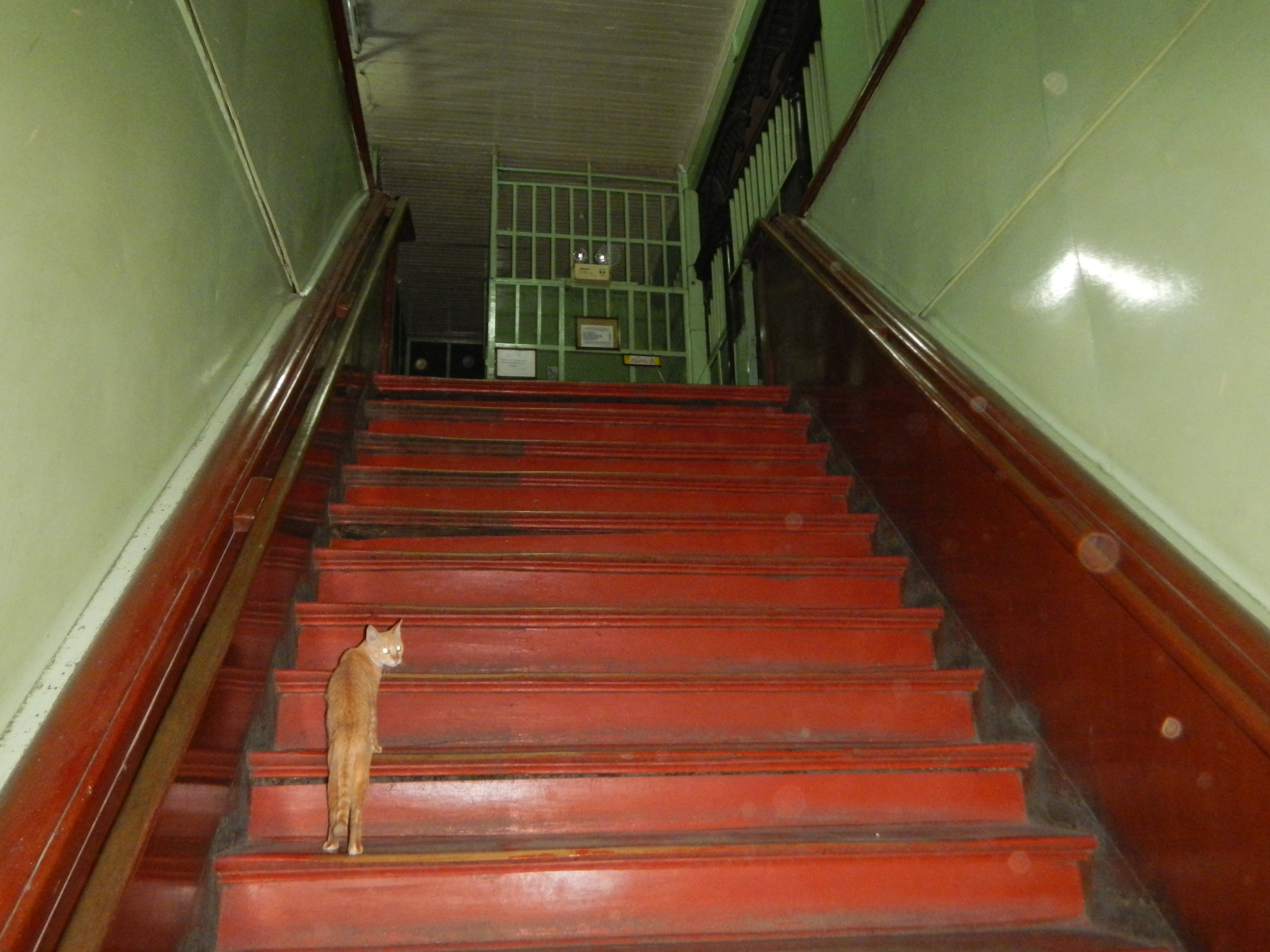
The stairs to the Hotel (Second floor)
