= Sunken Shrine of Our Lady of Lourdes of Cabetican =

Roman Catholic church in Pampanga, Philippines

- Archdiocesan Shrine of Our Lady of Lourdes
- Exterior of the shrine in 2026

- Location in Luzon Location in the Philippines
- 14°59′22″N 120°39′05″E
- Address: Cabetican, Bacolor, Pampanga
- Country: Philippines
- Denomination: Roman Catholic

History
- Dedication: Our Lady of Lourdes

Architecture
- Functional status: Active
- Architectural type: Church building
- Style: Brutalist

Administration
- Archdiocese: San Fernando

The Archdiocesan Shrine of Our Lady of Lourdes, commonly known as the Sunken Shrine of Our Lady of Lourdes of Cabetican, is a Roman Catholic church in Cabetican, Bacolor, Pampanga, Philippines. It is under the jurisdiction of the Archdiocese of San Fernando. Once standing seven-storeys high at its peak, or the equivalent of between 18 and 24 meters (59 and 79 ft), it was buried by a combination of accumulated volcanic ash from the 1991 eruption of Mount Pinatubo and subsequent lahar mud that flowed into Bacolor from 1991 to 1995. The lahar flow that entered Bacolor occurred after the provincial government of Pampanga decided to divert the continuing lahar movement to select areas within the province in order to spare highly urbanized Angeles.

In 2005, the church was partially excavated by the Philippine government in collaboration with Pampanga's provincial government and the parish of Bacolor.

== Structure ==
Once known simply as the Church of Our Lady of Lourdes of Cabetican, it was built in 1985 in the austere Brutalist style by engineer Julito D. Macapagal, Sr, and seven hitherto unnamed architects to enshrine the image of Our Lady of Lourdes. The statue, given to the municipality in 1901, was previously housed in a modest bamboo visita. Out of Print magazine referred to the shrine's Brutalist design as something that would "better fit along Roxas Boulevard than MacArthur Highway" in Bacolor.

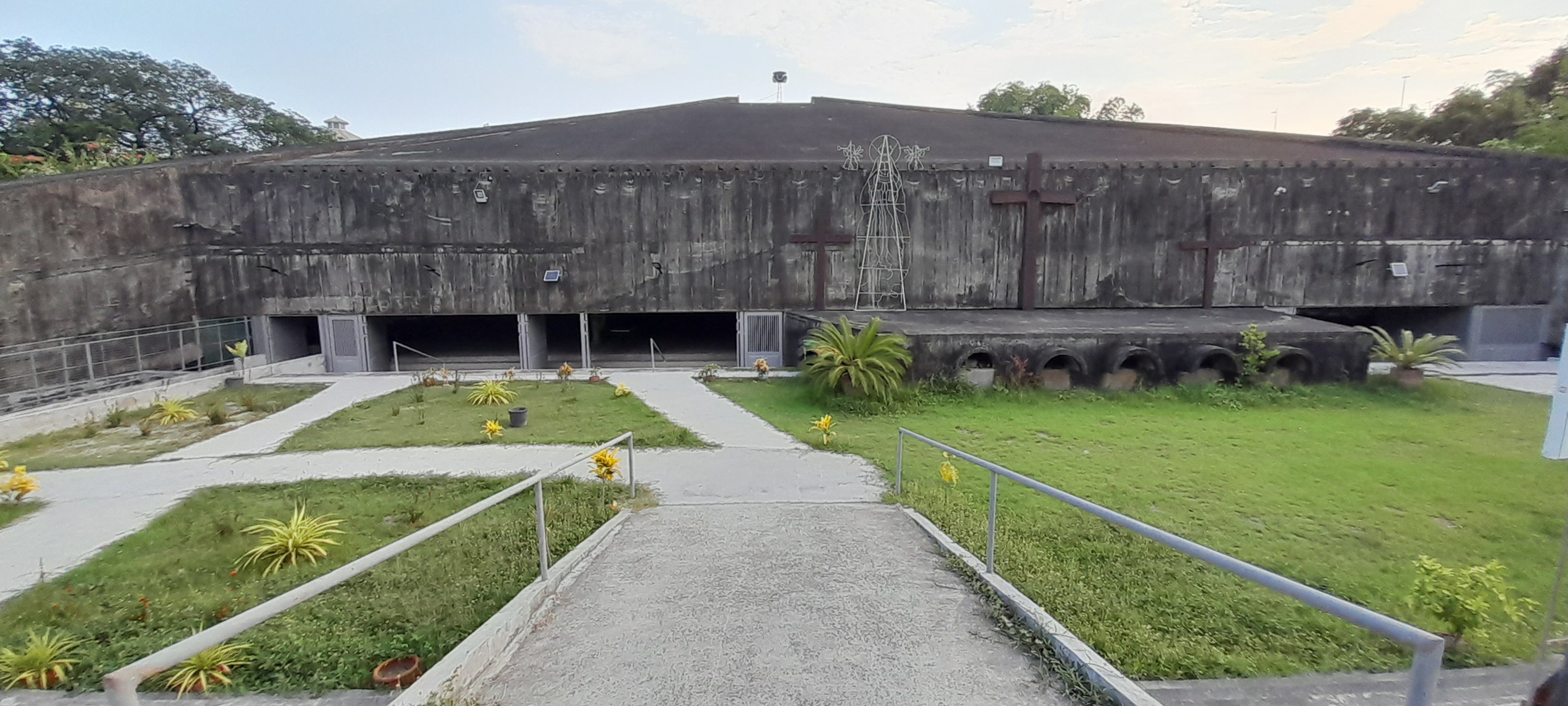
The entryways to the partially-excavated church, once seven meters (23 ft) tall, are now barely more than a meter high.

Designed as a triangular trapezoidal shrine with a sloping roof, the church measures 59.7 meters (196 ft) wide at its east face, 56.6 meters (186 ft) wide at its west face, and 36.8 meters (121 ft) wide at its south side. Its north face is the narrowest at 10.6 meters (35 ft), where the church's roof soars to its present excavated-part height of 12.7 meters (42 ft). The entry doorways on the east and west sides of the shrine, now barely more than a meter high, used to be around six to seven meters (20 to 23 ft) high. The choir loft at the southern end of the church, previously 6.6 meters (22 ft) from the floor, now hovers a mere 0.6 meters (2 ft 0 in) from the church's present floor. Around six to seven meters (20 to 23 ft) of the church's interior space has remained buried.

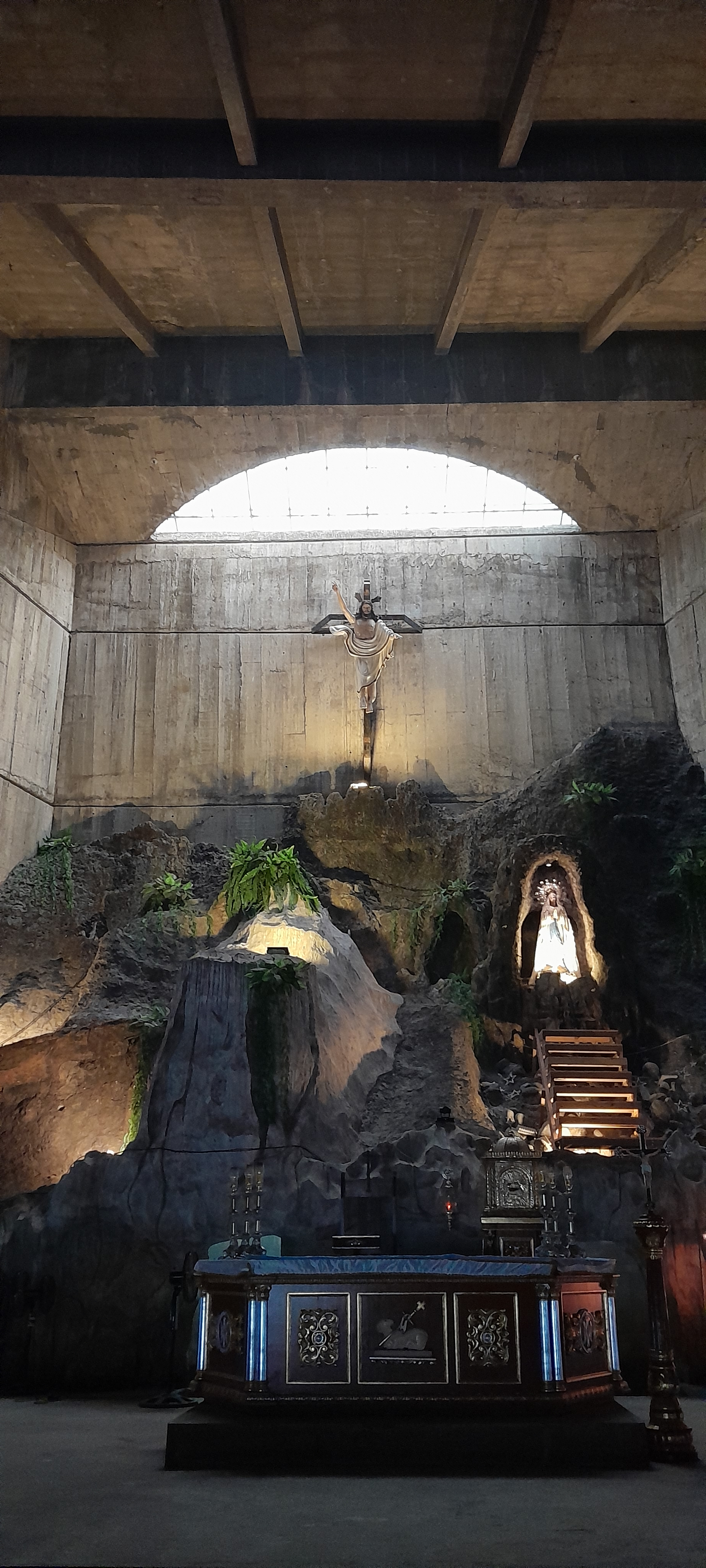
The now-low-ceilinged altar created for the shrine after its partial excavation in 2005, featuring one of the church's skylight windows with polycarbonate roofing

Comparatively, the then unburied shrine was almost equal in height to San Sebastián Basilica in Manila, which stands at 18 meters (59 ft) high at its nave and 30 meters (98 ft) at its dome. But the trapezoidal shrine in Cabetican is three times broader than the Manila church, and it had an amphitheater-style seating before the lahar incident.

== 1991– 1995 Bacolor lahar ==
The new seating of the excavated church is a modest contrast to its pre-lahar-incident amphitheater-style seating.

From 1991 to 1995, the lahar flow that entered Bacolor submerged the town in lahar mud, mostly between three and six meters (9.8 and 19.7 ft) thick, but burying even tall structures in the town's lower parts like the Church of Our Lady of Lourdes of Cabetican and Bacolor's famous San Guillermo Parish Church, which latter is a mere fifteen-minute walk from the shrine. As the lahar flow approached the town and threatened to erase all of Bacolor from Pampanga's map, the Church of Our Lady of Lourdes of Cabetican evacuated its Our Lady of Lourdes statue to St. James' Parish Church in Betis, Guagua, Pampanga.

== 2005 excavation and restoration ==
At the start of the 2005 excavation of the buried church, engineer Macapagal was already suffering from Alzheimer's disease, and none of the unknown seven architects presented themselves, so church and municipal records with the architects' names may have already been lost to the lahar. Without the vital information regarding the church's structural makeup that would be necessary for a complete excavation to proceed, the project team performed only a partial excavation, freeing up only enough space to create an entryway into the church as well as create usable interior space. Furthermore, excavating deeper in a barangay the ground level of which was now higher than previously would risk flooding the church further during the monsoon season. At present, parts of the church become flooded with rainwater half of the year.

The same process of limited excavation done on the Cabetican shrine was followed to some extent at the San Guillermo Church excavation and restoration.

=== Award ===
The local devotees' and parishioners' efforts to clean out the church along with local firm BAAD Studio's conceptual restoration plan won the Highly Commended Future Building of the Year civic award at the 2018 World Architecture Festival.
