= Práxedes Fajardo =

Práxedes Fajardo y Puno (21 July 1874 – 10 August 1928) was a Filipina revolutionary and head of the Pampangan section of the Philippine Red Cross during the anticolonial armed struggles against Spain and the United States.

== Life ==
Fajardo was born in Bacolor, Pampanga to Justino Fajardo and Andrea Puno. Educated at La Consolación in Manila, she would later be known for her organizational acumen as head of the Philippine Red Cross in Pampanga. She had been sent along with Nicolasa Dayrit Panlilio to mediate between generals Antonio Luna and Tomás Mascardo.

Fajardo remained unmarried throughout her life, instead opting to take care of her sister Florencia Gutiérrez’s family.
