= Nicolasa Dayrit Panlilio =

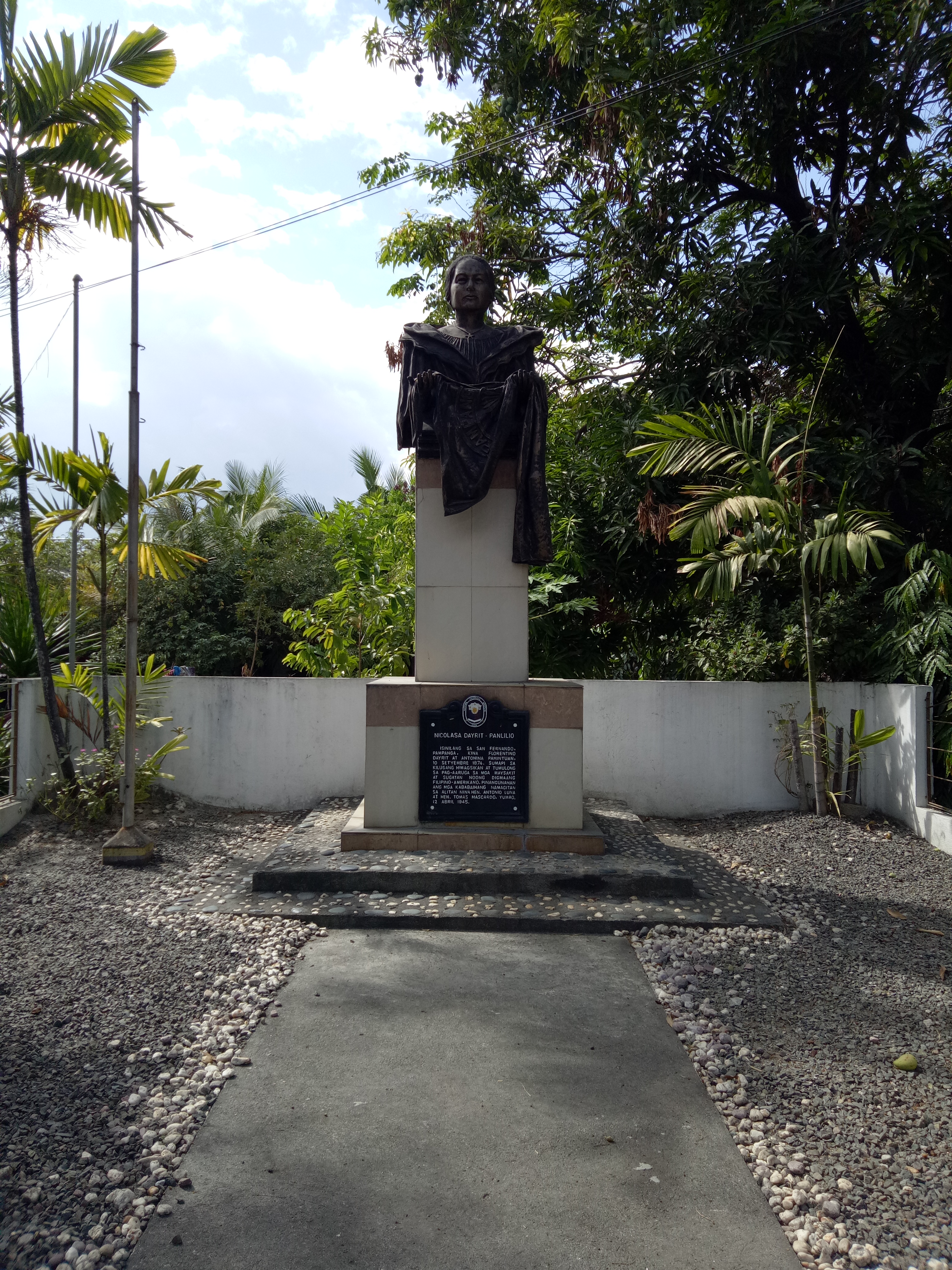
- Monument of Nicolasa Dayrit-Panlilio at Casa Nicolasa Heritage House in San Fernando, Pampanga
- Born: Nicolasa Pamintuan Dayrit; 10 September 1874; San Fernando, Pampanga, Captaincy General of the Philippines
- Died: 12 April 1945 (aged 70); Manila, Philippine Commonwealth
- Spouse: Dr. Vicente Panlilio
- Parent(s): Don Florentino Dayrit (father); Doña Antonina Pamintuan (mother)

Nicolasa Dayrit-Panlilio (10 September 1874 – 12 April 1945) was a Filipina non-combatant in the Philippine–American War. Her actions not only included helping to minister the sick and wounded Filipino combatants, but also played a major role in appeasing General Antonio Luna during his confrontation with General Tomas Mascardo. This contributed to the collapse of the Bagbag-Quingua-Sta. Maria defense line based on the Pampanga River, which was held against the American forces.

Governor Tiburcio Hilario, at the same time sent three emissaries to convince General Mascardo to submit himself to Luna's authority as Chief of Staff. At first Mascardo was nowhere to be found but later, he appeared in Betis to inform General Luna that he was willing to follow the latter's orders. That afternoon Luna returned to his headquarters, only to learn that his troops had been defeated in the Battle of Quingua.

== Early life ==
Nicolasa Dayrit was born to Don Florentino Dayrit, a Cabeza de Barangay and Doña Antonina Pamintuan, in San Fernando, on September 10, 1874. She was one of the well-educated women of her time, having studied under Don Modesto Joaquin in Bacolor. Fluent in Spanish, she was also one of the two more accomplished pianists in the province, the other being Doña Josefa Henson.

== Activities in the Philippine–American War ==
When American forces started bombarding this area, General Luna requested reinforcements from General Tomas Mascardo in Guagua, Pampanga but the latter carried out the order slowly and in protest. As a result, Luna ordered Mascardo arrest. The latter reacted sharply, arguing to Luna's emissary that while President Aguinaldo's decree applied to all troops of the provinces of Pampanga and Nueva Ecija, which were under Luna's jurisdiction, the decree did not apply to general officers of these troops. Mascardo concluded his response with the words, "If General Luna has enough guts to enforce his decree, Mascardo has enough to resist him."

Incensed, General Luna wired Governor Tiburcio Hilario to prepare for his arrival. He also ordered a special train into which all available infantry, cavalry, and artillery forces were loaded. To Luna, Mascardo's non-cooperation was a sign of weakness.

At this moment, the women of the province proved their high sense of patriotism while the men exerted every effort to bind and unite their armed forces. To the revolutionary leaders, the welfare of the Republic was greater than that of any man. Governor Tiburcio Hilario met General Luna first and pleaded with him to restore peace and unity at a crucial moment. He requested a delegation of women led by Nicolasa Dayrit and Pampanga's Red Cross President Praxedes Fajardo, to bring flowers and kneel before General Luna. The women met him on the steps of the convent in Bacolor on April 24, 1899, and successfully dissuaded Luna from violently confronting Mascardo.

== Later life ==
At the end of the war, perhaps due to the rigors of ministering the sick and the wounded, Nicolasa found herself often ill, unable to leave her bed. Many doctors treated her, to no avail. Someone advised her family to consult a young doctor who had just arrived from Madrid, Dr. Vicente Panlilio. She married Dr. Panlilio, and he built for his bride a two-storey house at San Jose Street, near Doña Antonina's house in the center of town. It was an elegant semi-concrete house with a concrete porch and a verandah through which one entered the living room.

The Panlilio's had five children: Luis, the eldest was a Harvard law graduate who became a good corporation lawyer and an industrialist, married Remedios Lazatin, the second was Carlos who seemed to be the tallest young man in town while Teresita who looked much like her mother, married Justice Augusto Luciano of Magalang; Pablo, an American, French educated architect, became successful in his field aside from being an industrialist, married socialite pianist Dolores Arguelles while the youngest is Lourdes.

During the Japanese occupation, like most prominent families in San Fernando, the Panlilios lost their house to the Japanese. General Masaharu Homma occupied it. When Manila was declared an open city, the Panlilios moved in, hoping that they would be more secure there. But in the Battle of Malate, Dr. Panlilio was lost, never to be seen again. Doña Nicolasa became despondent and died of a heart attack on April 12, 1945, possibly due to her depression.

== Re-interment and Military Honors ==
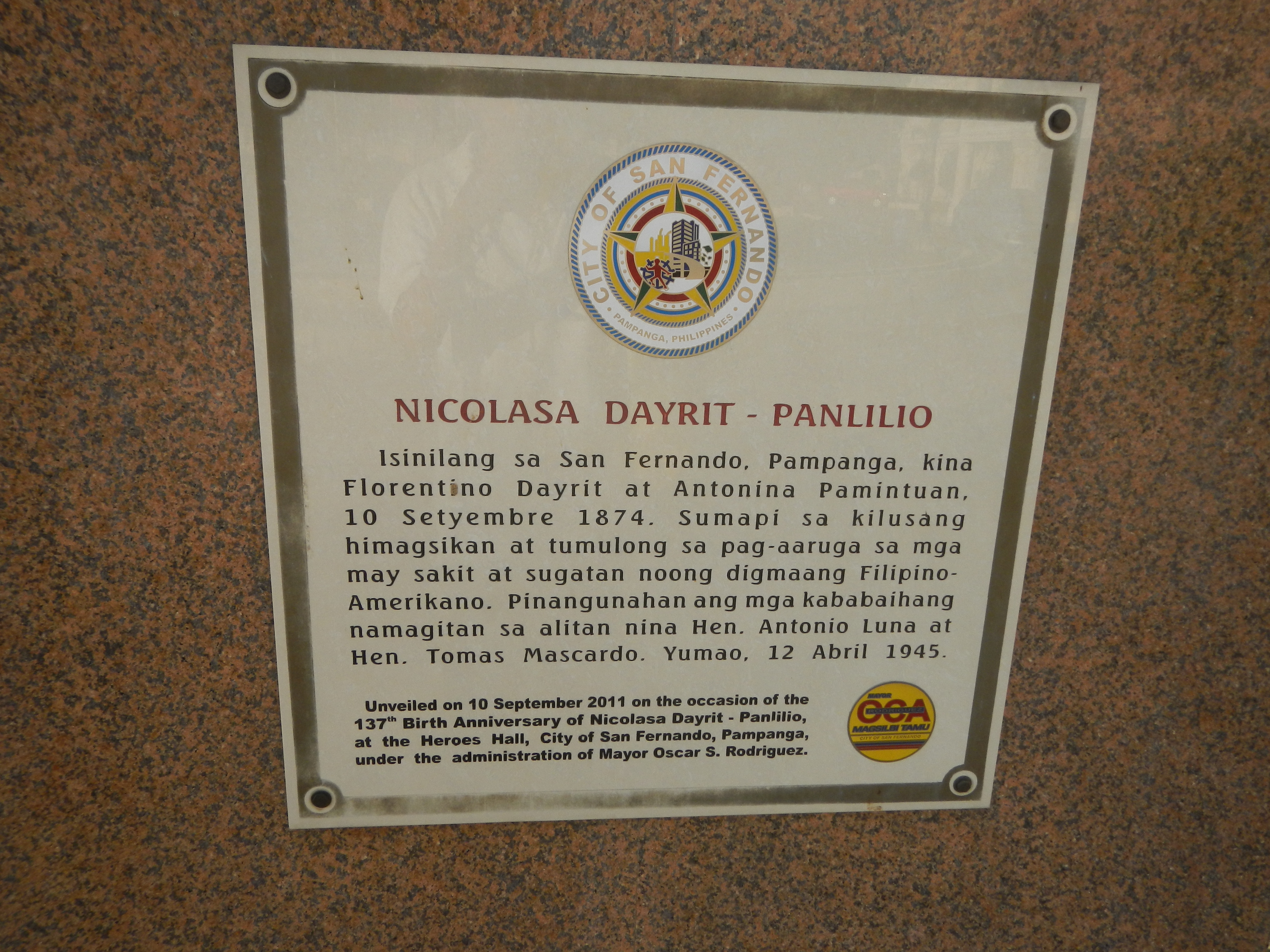
Historical marker

On September 9, 2004, her remains were transferred from Loyola Memorial Park in Sucat, Parañaque to the City of San Fernando, Pampanga with full honors and an overnight vigil with members of the Philippine Marines serving as honor guards. On September 10, 2006, the National Historical Institute placed a marker in her monument, recognizing her contributions to the fight for Philippine Independence.
