= May Bukas Pa (2009 TV series) =

2009–13 Philippine television drama series

- Title card
- Genre: Christian drama
- Based on: Marcelino by José María Sánchez-Silva
- Developed by: Dindo C. Perez; Julie Anne R. Benitez; Rondel P. Lindayag
- Written by: Dindo Perez; Shugo Praico; Ayis de Guzman
- Directed by: Jerome C. Pobocan; Jojo A. Saguin; Erick C. Salud
- Starring: Zaijian Jaranilla
- Theme music composer: Charo Unite; Ernie Dela Peña
- Ending theme: "May Bukas Pa" by Kyle Balili (eps. 1–31), by Kyle Balili and Erik Santos (eps. 32–263)
- Composers: Vincent de Jesus (Eps. 1–20); Jessie Lasaten (Eps. 21–263)
- Country of origin: Philippines
- Original language: Filipino
- No. of episodes: 263 (list of episodes)

Production
- Executive producers: Eugenio G. Lopez III; Charo Santos-Concio; Cory Vidanes; Laurenti M. Dyogi; Roldeo T. Endrinal; Rosselle Parana Soldao
- Producer: Ethel M. Espiritu
- Production locations: Metro Manila; Tanay, Rizal; Santa Rosa, Laguna; Bacolor, Pampanga; San Fernando, Pampanga; Mexico, Pampanga; Minalin, Pampanga; Apalit, Pampanga; Dinalupihan, Bataan; Morong, Bataan; Subic, Zambales
- Running time: 37–46 minutes
- Production company: ABS-CBN Studios

Original release
- Network: ABS-CBN
- Release: 2 February 2009 – 5 February 2010

May Bukas Pa (lit. 'There's Still Tomorrow') is a Philippine television drama broadcast by ABS-CBN. Based on the novel Marcelino by José María Sánchez-Silva, it was directed by Jerome C. Pobocan, Jojo A. Saguin, and Erick C. Salud. It stars Zaijian Jaranilla, Albert Martinez, Dina Bonnevie, Tonton Gutierrez, Maja Salvador, Rayver Cruz, Dominic Ochoa, Desiree del Valle, Precious Lara Quigaman, Lito Pimentel, and Jaime Fabregas.

The series aired on the network's Primetime Bida line up and worldwide on TFC from February 2, 2009, to February 5, 2010, replacing Precious Time and Eva Fonda and was replaced by Agua Bendita.

== Cast and characters ==
=== Main cast ===
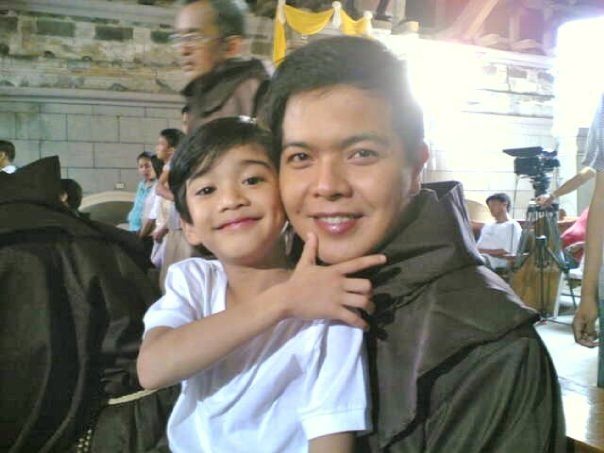
Zaijian Jaranilla (left) portrays Santino Guillermo. Andre Tiangco (right) portrays Fr. George

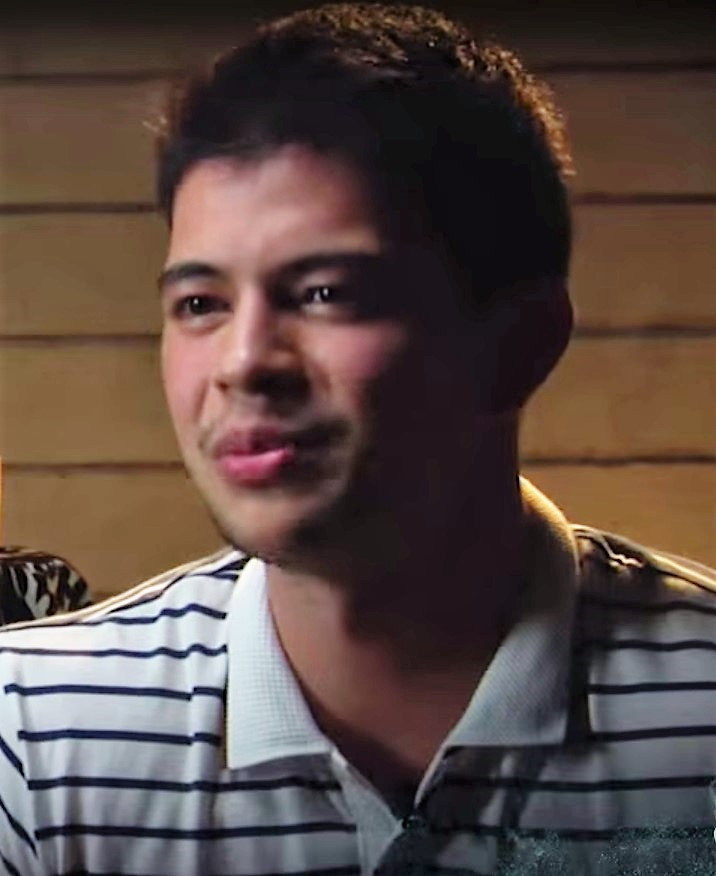
Rayver Cruz portrays Francisco "Cocoy" Bautista

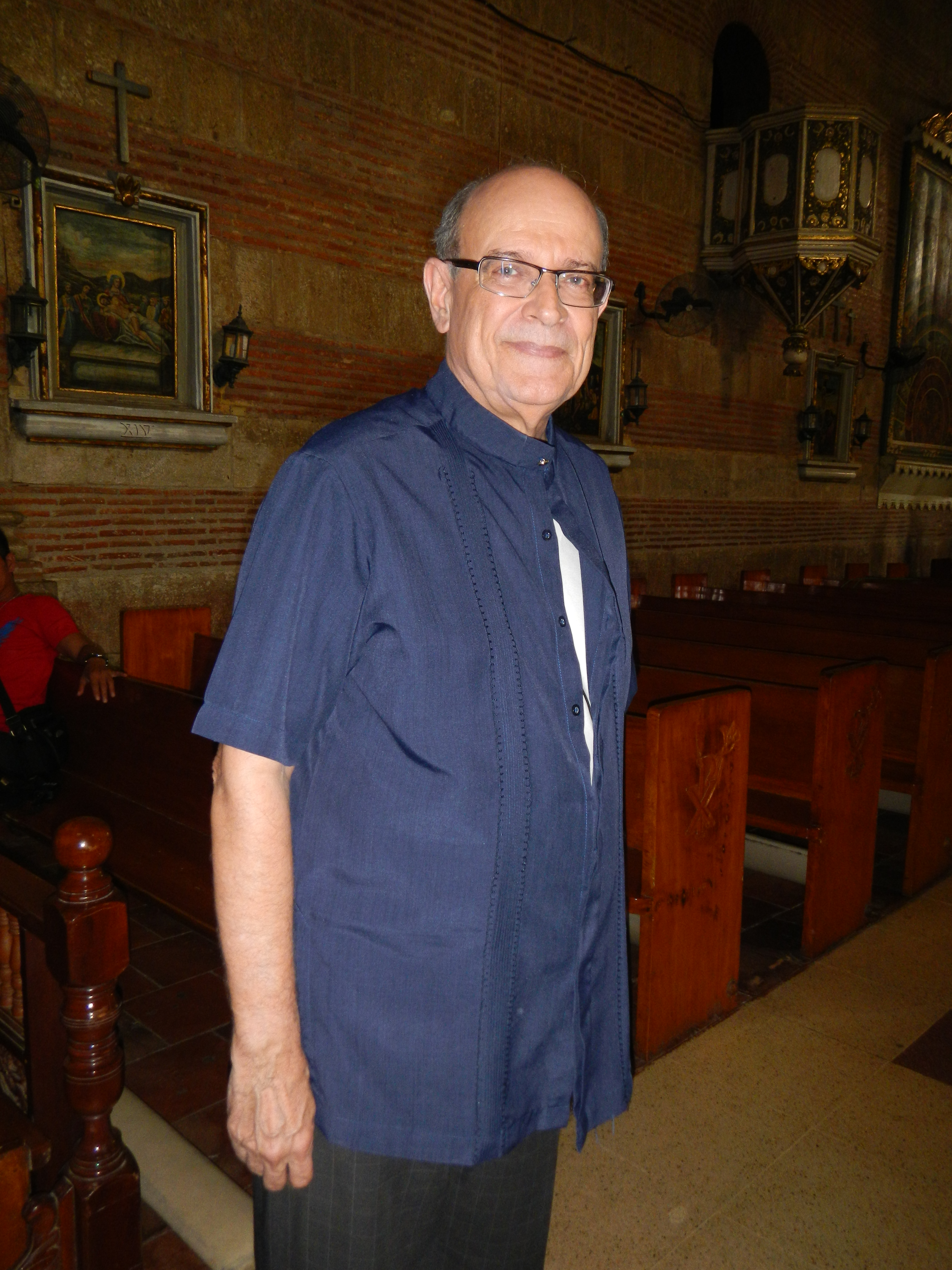
Jaime Fabregas portrays Fr. Anthony

Lead cast

- Zaijian Jaranilla as Santino Guillermo

Supporting cast

- Albert Martinez as Mayor Enrique D. Rodrigo/Gonzalvo Policarpio†
  - Jairus Aquino as young Enrique Rodrigo/Gonzalvo Policarpio
- Dina Bonnevie as Malena Rodriguez-Rodrigo/Policarpio†
- Precious Lara Quigaman as SPO3 (P/MCSgt.) Criselda "Sélda" Rodriguez-Sta. Maria
- Tonton Gutierrez as SPO1 (P/MSgt.) Mario Sta. Maria
- Jaime Fabregas as Fr. Anthony Ruiz
- Dominic Ochoa as Fr. José Guillermo
- Lito Pimentel as Fr. Gregorio "Ringo" Samonte
  - Rodjun Cruz as young Gregorio "Ringo" Samonte
- Maja Salvador as Stella R. Sta. Maria
- Rayver Cruz as Francisco "Cocoy" Bautista
- Desiree del Valle as Clautilde Katerina "Tilde" Magdayo-Rodrigo/Policarpio

=== Spiritual characters ===
- Love Thadani (uncredited) as Jesus Christ
- Uncredited voice actor as Satan
- Charo Santos-Concio as Mother Mary

=== The Priests ===
- Victor Basa as Fr. John Delgado
- Badjie Mortiz as Fr. Paul Makopa
- David Chua as Fr. Chino "Chi" Wang
- Andre Tiangco† as Fr. George
- Ruben Gonzaga as Fr. Patrick
- Edgar Sandalo† as Fr. Jude

=== Recurring cast ===
- Ogie Diaz as Renato "Atong" Arguelles
- Arlene Muhlach as Viviana "Baby" Arguelles
- Timothy Chan as Rico R. Rodrigo/Policarpio
- Phoebe Khae Arbotante as Joy R. Sta. Maria
- Victor Basa as Fr. John Delgado

=== Additional cast ===
- Francis Magundayao as Paco
- Miguelito de Guzman as Alfred
- Liza Lorena as Doña Anita Rodriguez
- Michael Conan as Dante Maoricio
- Ron Morales as Robert Sanchez/ Gustavo Policarpio
- Jerry O'Hara as Senior Superintendent Raul Guevarra
- Rosalie, Kimberly, and Jennifer as fictitious versions of themselves
- Erin Panlilio as Grace

=== Special participation and appearance ===
- Pope John Paul II† as Himself

== Production ==
The series was announced in late 2008, the same year Zaijian Jaranilla became an actor for ABS-CBN/Star Magic. The network's TV production team sought a church suitable for the series' religious-themed story. Initially titled "Marcelino," the name was later changed to its final title, May Bukas Pa, a few months after the show's announcement.

The story conference for the series took place on January 9, 2009, where the show's logo was revealed.

Taping or principal photography of the main series occurred from January 15, 2009, to February 5, 2010.

Most of the scenes were taped in San Guillermo Parish Church in Barangay Cabambangan and the Municipal Hall of Bacolor in Barangay Calibutbut, Bacolor, Pampanga. The overall production process of the series proper, including its announcement and story conference, spanned two years. Three months after it, the specials and film followed for four years from May 5, 2010, with Maalaala Mo Kaya (MMK) episode Xylophone to John Paul II and John XXIII Mga Bagong Santo: The ABS-CBN News Special Coverage and its subsequent report on TV Patrol Weekend on April 27, 2014, culmulating from the previous Sunday's Best: Banal on May 22, 2011.

=== Casting ===
In 2009, Maja Salvador took a three-month break from the show to focus on Nagsimula sa Puso. During this time, she and Precious Lara Quigaman announced that they had joined the new show Precious Hearts Romances Presents: Impostor, which premiered in 2010.

=== Broadcast and release ===
The series proper underwent two versions, with the original cut version aired on ABS-CBN from February 2, 2009, to February 5, 2010, where it did not air the deleted scene of the show's finale episode, and is the one watched by the casts during the farewell ceremony of its production at Ariato Function Centre, Il Terrazzo, Tomas Morato, Quezon City. During this version, a station identification Star ng Pasko (Tagalog for "Star of Christmas") was aired on November 4, 2009, followed by three specials which are the two-parter Bro, Ikaw ang Star ng Pasko: The 2009 ABS-CBN Christmas Special and Shoutout 2009: Wagi o Sawi? The ABS-CBN Yearend Special on December 13, 20, and 27, 2009, respectively. Parts of it was uploaded on Jeepney TV YouTube channel in 2025.

On May 22, 2011, ABS-CBN aired one special about Pope John Paul II in reference to the series which is Banál (Tagalog for "holy"), during the two-year hiatus between airing of cut ABS-CBN and extended clean feed versions, to commemorate his beatification where Zaijian Jaranilla and Jaime Fabregas reprised their roles as Santino and Father Anthony to present the life of John Paul II and significance for Filipinos.

In July 2012, after a two-year hiatus, the second extended clean feed version was released initially online on TFC where some episodes replaced the original 2009–2010 ABS-CBN broadcast cut with those without a network logo and MTRCB rating and continued through airing on Jeepney TV, announced on February 28, 2013, from March 11 to December 5, 2013. This version was uploaded to the main ABS-CBN Entertainment channel and iWant, as well as some episodes on Jeepney TV. With this, the series became the first primetime TV series in the Philippines to span in the 2010s decade and have two versions in ABS-CBN history before the 2023–2024's Linlang (also directed by Jojo A. Saguin and Dreamscape Entertainment production) in the 2020s.

==== Reruns ====
It aired two reruns of its first season. The first rerun was from April 9 to 11, 2009, during the Paschal Triduum of that year, in which the first 48 episodes were re-aired.

The second is from March 16, 2020, to May 4, 2020, temporarily replacing Ang Probinsyano due to the community quarantines caused by the COVID-19 pandemic in the Philippines, which led ABS-CBN to suspend tapings of their ongoing drama series. During this period, the first 65 episodes of the series were rerun. It ended on May 5, 2020, due to the network's shutdown that night, following the expiration of its broadcast franchise the day prior.

The third rerun of the 2013 extended version on ALLTV, channel 2, formerly ABS-CBN's channel space as DWWX-TV, premiered on May 13, 2024, as part of Jeepney TV on ALLTV's programming.

=== Extension ===
Due to the show's ratings, ABS-CBN's management decided to extend the show for 20 weeks instead of the initial eight weeks. On June 23, 2009, ABS-CBN television head Cory Vidanes announced that the show production would be extended until February 2010.

=== Marketing ===
In line with the show's immense popularity, various merchandise such as t-shirts, sandals, and other items were produced for children.

== Music ==
=== Theme song ===
The theme song of the religious drama with the same title was originally performed by Rico J. Puno. The first version is sung by Kyle Balili, and the second version is sung by Erik Santos.

=== Soundtrack ===
May Bukas Pa (Conversations Of Bro & Santino)

Soundtrack album by Various Artists
- Released: 2009
- Genre: Soundtrack
- Length: 47:11
- Language: Filipino (one track is recorded in English)
- Label: Star Music
- Producer: ABS-CBN Film Productions, Inc.

No.	Title	Artist	Length
1.	"May Bukas Pa"	Kyle Balili	4:25
2.	"Pagmamahal - Conversations"	Bro (Love Thadani), Santino (Zaijian Jaranilla)	0:49
3.	"Nariyan Ka"	Juris	4:32
4.	"Pagpapatawad - Conversations"	Bro (Love Thadani), Santino (Zaijian Jaranilla)	0:44
5.	"Gaya ng Dati"	Erik Santos	5:30
6.	"Kapayapaan - Conversations"	Bro (Love Thadani), Santino (Zaijian Jaranilla)	0:48
7.	"Sana"	Yeng Constantino, Kyle Balili	4:06
8.	"Pagpapagaling - Conversations"	Bro (Love Thadani), Santino (Zaijian Jaranilla)	0:40
9.	"Panalangin sa Pagiging Bukas Palad"	Jaime Rivera	3:05
10.	"Pagpaparaya - Conversations"	Bro (Love Thadani), Santino (Zaijian Jaranilla)	0:38
11.	"Pananagutan"	Bugoy Drilon	3:55
12.	"Pananampalataya - Conversations"	Bro (Love Thadani), Santino (Zaijian Jaranilla)	0:33
13.	"Awit ng Puso"	Fatima Soriano	3:35
14.	"Pagbibigayan"	Bro (Love Thadani), Santino (Zaijian Jaranilla)	0:38
15.	"Ganyan ang Pasko"	Toni Gonzaga	3:47
16.	"Kaligayahan - Conversations"	Bro (Love Thadani), Santino (Zaijian Jaranilla)	0:40
17.	"Tomorrow"	Rhap Salazar	3:31
18.	"Pag-Asa"	Bro (Love Thadani), Santino (Zaijian Jaranilla)	0:31
19.	"May Bukas Pa"	Erik Santos	4:37
Total length:			47:11

=== ABS-CBN Christmas ID ===
Parol ni Bro Promotion

ABS-CBN's Christmas 2009 campaign was inspired by the show's popularity. The song is entitled "Star ng Pasko" (lit. 'Star of Christmas'). Christmas lanterns were specially created by ABS-CBN and sold to benefit ABS-CBN Foundation's charity programs. ABS-CBN launched Parol ni Bro on November 4, 2009, where an 18-foot Christmas lantern atop the ABS-CBN building was lit up by the cast of May Bukas Pa, ABS-CBN president Charo Santos-Concio, and ABS-CBN chairman and CEO Eugenio Lopez III.

== Ratings ==
May Bukas Pa currently holds the record of being the highest-rating television show on Philippine television since switching to a nationwide TV ratings system on the opening day of 2009, peaking during its finale with a 47.3% nationwide rating according to Kantar Media/TNS.

Within the ABS-CBN's primetime block, it was the highest for the period upon its premiere on February 2, 2009, until Mara Clara on February 3, 2011.

Kantar Media National TV Ratings (7:45PM to 8:30/9:15PM PST)
Pilot Episode	Finale Episode	Peak	Average
26.4% February 2, 2009	47.3% February 5, 2010	47.3% February 5, 2010	N/A

== Criticism ==
Entertainment columnist Nestor Torre of the Philippine Daily Inquirer said, "It must have been a big decision for the new show's producers to get away from that downbeat view of life and come up with this Marcelino Pan Y Vino-inspired tale. But it's great to note that the gamble has paid off in a big way: May Bukas Pa has been enjoying very good ratings, proving what we've been saying all this time--that viewers want to be inspired by the dramas they watch." However, he criticized the show's "religious" scenes as "poorly, shallowly staged," which he felt made genuine inspiration and devotion difficult to come by while viewing the series. He further criticized the show's use of extras, who mostly played sick people but were perceived as bad actors. He adds, "Any director worth his salt would have sensed that the montage of healing needed good actors to make it meaningful and moving. Why were inept actors used instead? Possibly because the production was scrimping on talent fees. Well, it was a penny-wise pound-foolish decision, because the important sequence was botched."

== Reception ==
=== Political ===
On December 29, 2009, 235th episode, Mario (Tonton Gutierrez) filed for candidacy as mayor of Bagong Pag-asa. This reflected the then-ongoing two-year 2009–2011 transition of all levels of Philippine national and local governments including the cancelled Autonomous Region in Muslim Mindanao (ARMM) in 2011 that led to officials instead appointing officers-in-charge (OIC) for the region for the 2008–2011 term which ended December 22, 2011.

The series featured the Philippine National Police (PNP), showing its hierarchy in a particular police station and situation as an officer, including Absence Without Leave (AWOL) for not doing the duties and responsibilities properly, making it an example to notably feature police scenes on a high-rating show before the long-running Coco Martin series FPJ's Ang Probinsyano and FPJ's Batang Quiapo.

It shows how Philippine politics works including involvement with the Catholic Church and people voicing about issues within their jurisdiction as mandated by the freedom of speech part of 1987 Constitution of the Philippines.

=== Religious ===
The religion have a right to speak, react, and interact with the government due to a reason mentioned before as explained by the series. Being a Catholic-focused series, it shows activities made at the church such as celebrating Mass, sharing sermons by a priest to the faithful, ordination, and sacrament of reconciliation.

The show reflected the beatification of Pope John Paul II, resignation of Benedict XVI, and Pope Francis on March 13, 2013, became pope resulting from the March 11–12 conlave.

=== Values ===
The series focuses on kindness and morality in humanity, depicting a child who believes that there's always a way to rectify mistakes, sinfulness, and imperfections, no matter how serious. He trusts that "Bro," his nickname for Jesus Christ, is loving and will always guide with light with a condition of not abusing and wasting them, and use as an opportunity to change for the better and towards salvation by asking for forgiveness and address if realized that it is wrong and considered as a sin like lying while living on a physical world as shown on the show's 196th episode aired on November 4, 2009. It teaches how to suffer physically and spiritually for better results like what Bro did during his suffering, dying on the cross and resurrection, being generous, love for the family, and be independent on some situations. The show has had a significant impact on many Filipinos, shaping their outlook on life in a positive manner.

People also motivate more to honor the Catholic Sabbath by going to Mass at the main Sunday and extended Holy Days of Obligation, days designated to oblige to attend because the celebration in associated to them are important in the history of religion's faith, through the contents of this series.

=== Commemoration and legacy media ===
Being having the main set in Bacolor, Pampanga, it was created to commemorate the 1991–1995 Mt. Pinatubo disaster, especially its 20th anniversary in 2011, which affected some parts of the province including the said municipality.

Another commemoration are Typhoons Ondoy and Pepeng from September 24 to October 14, 2009, which led to the creation and recording of Star ng Pasko from October to November 4, 2009, University of Santo Tomas (UST) Quadricentennial Celebration from December 18, 2009, to January 17, 2012, ABS-CBN's 60th anniversary from 2013 to 2014 where an airing of the series' extended version was aired on Jeepney TV and it was featured on The Buzz, and start of usage of its 2013 logo as the network digitalized, diversifies, and modernizes its way of broadcasting and its facilities.

Maalaala Mo Kaya (MMK) episode Xylophone, aired on May 8, 2010, serves as the Mother's Day special episode in 2010 and as an extension to the main series' storyline of guesting of Ai-ai delas Alas from May to July of the previous year as she also made appearance to this episode where it is about determining the mother of a titular character played by Zaijian Jaranilla on a particular media albeit instead of Santino as the character name, he played as Charles.

The 2010–2011 Christmas Station ID Ngayong Pasko Magniningning ang Pilipino (lit. 'The Filipinos will Shine this Christmas'), with theme released on October 8, 2010, song recorded from October 8 to November 2010, and station ID aired from November 4, 2010, to January 2011, has the same tune as its predecessor 2009–2010's Bro, Ikaw ang Star ng Pasko (lit. Bro, You are the Star of Christmas) with it was first used on 2002–2003's Isang Pamilya, Isang Puso Ngayong Pasko (lit. One Family, One Heart this Christmas) and part of the former's lyrics was used near the end to reflect that the series is the highest-rating in Philippine television since the opening of Kantar TV ratings in 2009, and on ABS-CBN's primetime block for the period of February 2, 2009 to February 3, 2011. This tune was next to be used on 2017–2018's Just Love Ngayong Christmas (lit. Just Love this Christmas) six years after the 2010–2011's ID was last aired.

After production of the show ended on February 5, 2010, Zaijian Jaranilla made various returns to Bacolor Church as part of his annual practice.

From April 23, 2011, to March 20, 2026, four films related to the series were made which are Pak! Pak! My Dr. Kwak!, The Last Beergin, Seeds of Peace, and Utoy Story were made, all featuring Jaranilla and use religious concepts. Pak! Pak! My Dr. Kwak! has similarities with the series which are talking to spiritual characters (Satan and God as the red on a latter and white at the former, respectively), has a mission for the character, and performing miracles to heal people. On the other hand, Seeds of Peace is about the life of priest-martyr Rhoel Gallardo. The first was produced by Star Cinema while the rest are non-ABS-CBN indie films.

On April 27, 2014, the special John Paul II and John XXIII Mga Bagong Santo: The ABS-CBN News Special Coverage which covered the canonization and its report on TV Patrol Weekend that followed the coverage were aired. While cumulated from the previous Sunday's Best: Banal three years earlier on May 22, 2011, both did not featured Jaranilla as Santino unlike the third mentioned.

The 1,494th episode of the game show Family Feud, aired on December 18, 2025 on GMA Network's (on which ABS-CBN has currently being collaborated to since 2022), had Zaijian and his sibling Zymic Jaranilla (who played as the protagonist Santino and Junjun in the series respectively), their father Zenon Jaranilla, and Glenn Reynon as the contestants. It is a reference to May Bukas Pa, The Last Beergin, I'mPerfect, Seeds of Peace, and Utoy Story (with the third being in production at the time of episode's airing, fourth for its preparation, and first, second, fourth, and fifth are religious-themed).

== Accolades ==
As a result of the show's success, many awards were given to the program and its cast. May Bukas Pa also received an award at the 2009 Catholic Mass Media Awards, besides its Best Drama award, presented by Manila Archbishop Gaudencio Rosales. The award was accepted by lead star Zaijian Jaranilla and the supporting actors who portrayed priests, dressed in cassocks for the occasion. The Anak TV Seal Awards were also awarded twice, in 2009 and 2010.

Year	Category	Recipient	Result
2009–2012	Anak TV Seal Awards	Mala Makabata Awardee (Zaijian Jaranilla)	Included
2009–2012	1st MTRCB TV Awards	Special Award for Promoting Moral Values	Won
2009–2012	Seoul International Drama Awards	Best Drama Series	Nominated
2009–2012	Catholic Mass Media Awards	Best Drama (tied with Tayong Dalawa)	Won
2009–2012	ASAP Pop Viewer's Choice Awards	Pop Kapamilya New Face (Zaijian Jaranilla)	Won
2009–2012	ASAP Pop Viewer's Choice Awards	Pop Kapamilya TV Show	Nominated
2009–2012	18th KBP Golden Dove Awards	Best Primetime Drama Series	Won
2009–2012	PMPC Star Awards for Television	Best Primetime Drama Series	Won
2009–2012	PMPC Star Awards for Television	Best Male New TV Personality (Zaijian Jaranilla)	Won
2009–2012	PMPC Star Awards for Television	Best Drama Actor (Albert Martinez)	Nominated
2009–2012	8th Gawad Tanglaw	Special Jury Award for Television	Won
2009–2012	8th Gawad Tanglaw	Natatanging Gawad TANGLAW para sa Sining ng Telebisyon (Zaijian Jaranilla)	Won
2009–2012	6th USTv Awards	Students' Choice of Actor in a Daily Soap Opera (Zaijian Jaranilla)	Won
2009–2012	12th Gawad PASADO Awards	Pinakapasadong Simbolo sa Kagandahang Asal (Zaijian Jaranilla)	Won
2009–2012	41st GMMSF Box-Office Entertainment Awards	TV Program of the Year	Won
2009–2012	41st GMMSF Box-Office Entertainment Awards	TV Directors of the Year (Jojo Saguin and Jerome Pobocan )	Won
2009–2012	32nd Catholic Mass Media Awards	Best Inspirational Album (May Bukas Pa (Conversations of Bro and Santino))	Won
2009–2012	Anak TV Seal Awards	2010 Anak TV Roster of Makabata Stars (Zaijian Jaranilla; also with Noah)	Won
2009–2012	1st Lingkod TV Awards	Most Favorite Child Personalities (Zaijian Jaranilla; also with Noah)	Won
2009–2012	20th Golden Dove Awards	Best TV Specials Program (Sunday's Best: Banál)	Won
2009–2012	8th USTv Awards	Students' Choice of Catholic Program (Sunday's Best: Banál)	Won
2022	Jeepney Fan Favorite Awards	Fave Child Star (Zaijian Jaranilla)	Won
