= San Guillermo Parish Church (Bacolor) =

Roman Catholic church in Pampanga, Philippines

Bacolor Church
- San Guillermo Parish Church
- Parroquia de San Guillermo Ermitaño (Spanish)
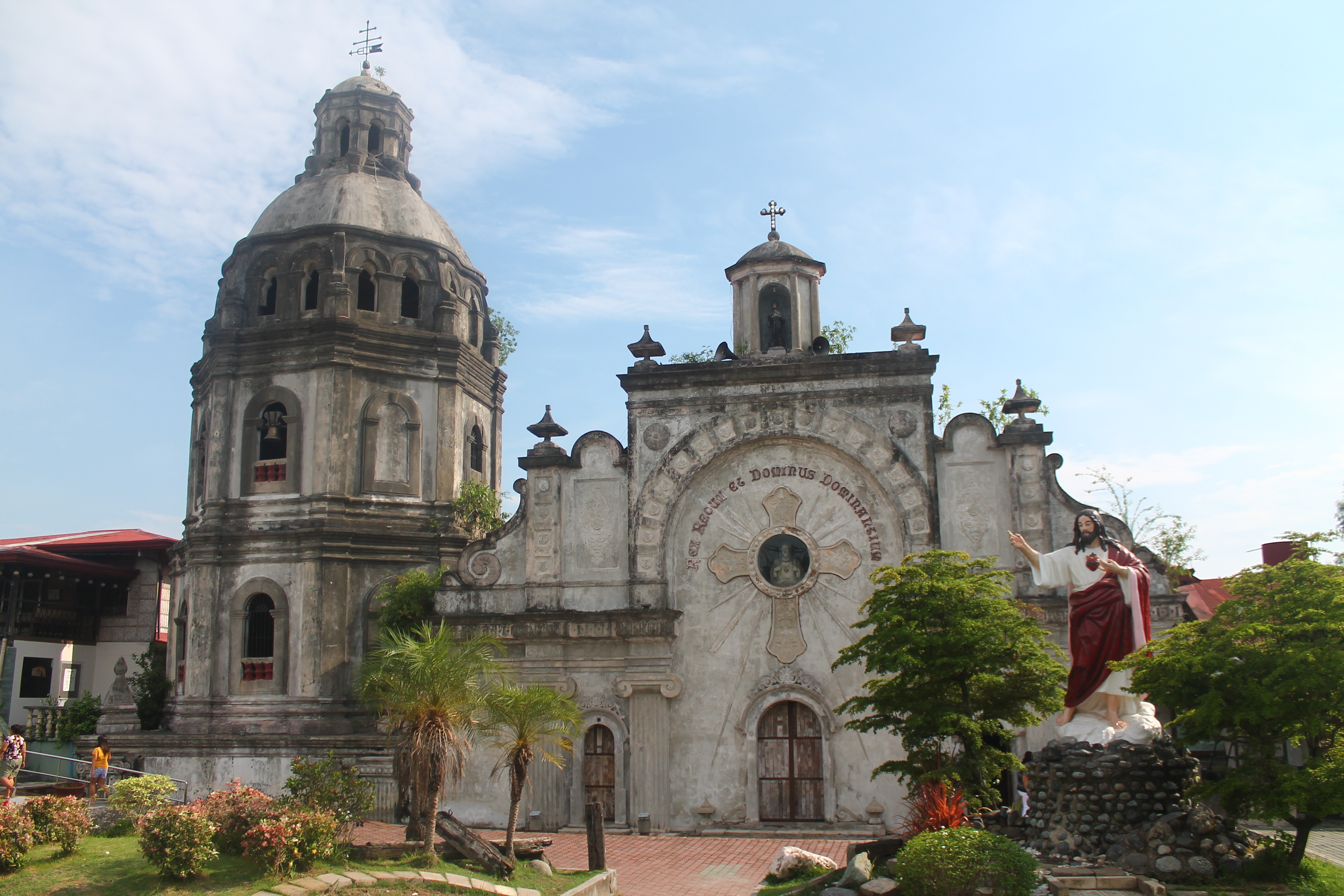
- Church facade in 2024

- Location in Luzon Location in the Philippines
- 15°00′01″N 120°38′54″E
- Location: Bacolor, Pampanga
- Country: Philippines
- Denomination: Roman Catholic

History
- Status: Parish church
- Dedication: William of Maleval

Architecture
- Functional status: Active
- Architectural type: Church building
- Groundbreaking: 1576

Administration
- Archdiocese: Roman Catholic Archdiocese of San Fernando

Clergy
- Archbishop: Most. Rev. Florentino G. Lavarias
- Priest: Rev. Fr. Joseph Theodore Valencia

San Guillermo Parish Church, commonly known as Bacolor Church, is a Roman Catholic church in Bacolor, Pampanga, Philippines. It is under the jurisdiction of the Archdiocese of San Fernando. Named after and dedicated to William of Maleval, the town's patron saint, the church was originally constructed by the Augustinian Friars in 1576 – also the town's founding – with Padre Diego de Ochoa, OSA, becoming the town's first parish priest two years later.

In 1880, the church was destroyed by an earthquake, and rebuilt by Fr. Eugenio Alvarez in 1886. On September 3, 1995, lahar flow from the slopes of Mount Pinatubo which erupted on June 15, 1991, buried the church to half its 12-metre (39 ft) height, prompting more than 50,000 town residents to evacuate to safer grounds in resettlement areas. Near the façade of the parish church is a museum on the history of the church. It also contains paintings of the Pinatubo eruption in 1991.

== History ==
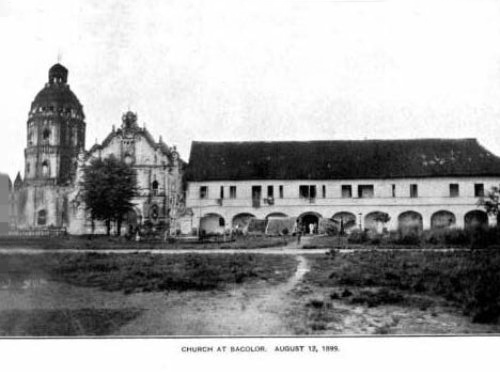
Bacolor Church on August 17, 1899

Bacolor is one of the oldest towns in the Philippines. The first church was built by the Augustinian friars in 1576 on the lot of Don Guillermo Manabat, a wealthy landlord believed to be the founder of Bacolor.

An earthquake destroyed the church and a new church was built by Fr. Manuel Diaz in 1897. It has a central nave and well-lighted transept with windows. The main retablo, side retablos and pulpit are gilded with gold leaf. The richness of the decoration of Bacolor church depicts the advanced stage of Baroque and Rococo.

After the Mount Pinatubo eruption in 1991 which caused the lahars to flow into the municipality that half-buried the church, the structure remained in use as a place of worship. It was a tourist destination before the 1991 eruption, and more tourists came to the church, whose remaining features are being preserved and maintained, afterwards.

== Description ==
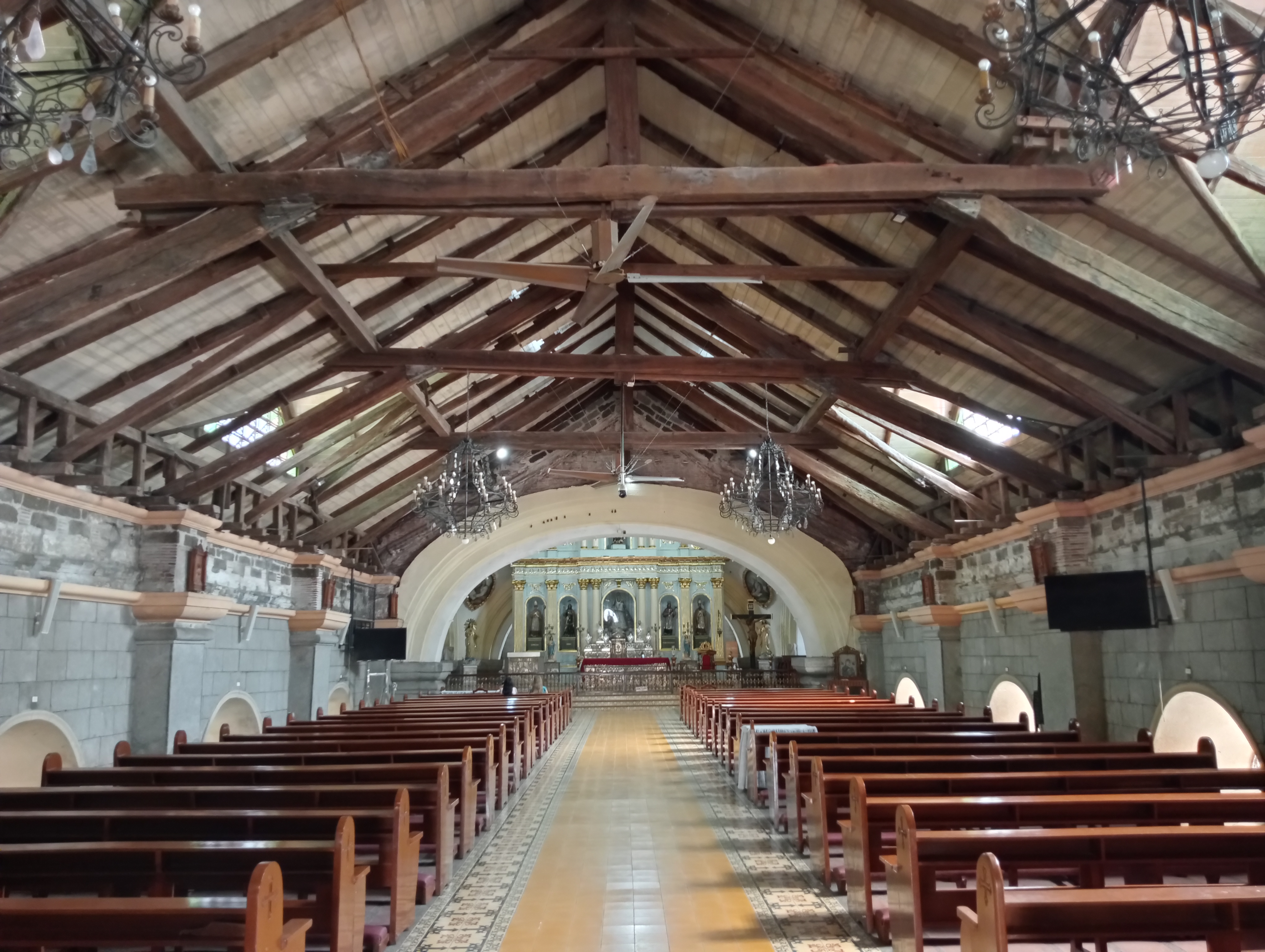
Church interior in 2024

The church features a main retablo, side retablos and a pulpit heavily gilded with gold leaves. The rich decorations of the church depict the Baroque style of architecture. Only half of the original facade of the church can be seen after it was half-buried by the eruption. After the eruption, the town's people excavated the altar and the retablo and relocated it under the dome. The retablos niches are filled with centuries-old statues which were saved from destruction of the lahar. The citizens of Bacolor carefully excavated the ornately carved main and side altars and restored in its immaculate condition. The choir area used to be located above the sanctuary but since the lahar occurred, the citizens of Bacolor decided that the area be moved.

== Museo de Bacolor ==
Part of the Church is the Recuerdos Sagrados de Bacolor (Sacred Memorabilia of Bacolor) or Museum.

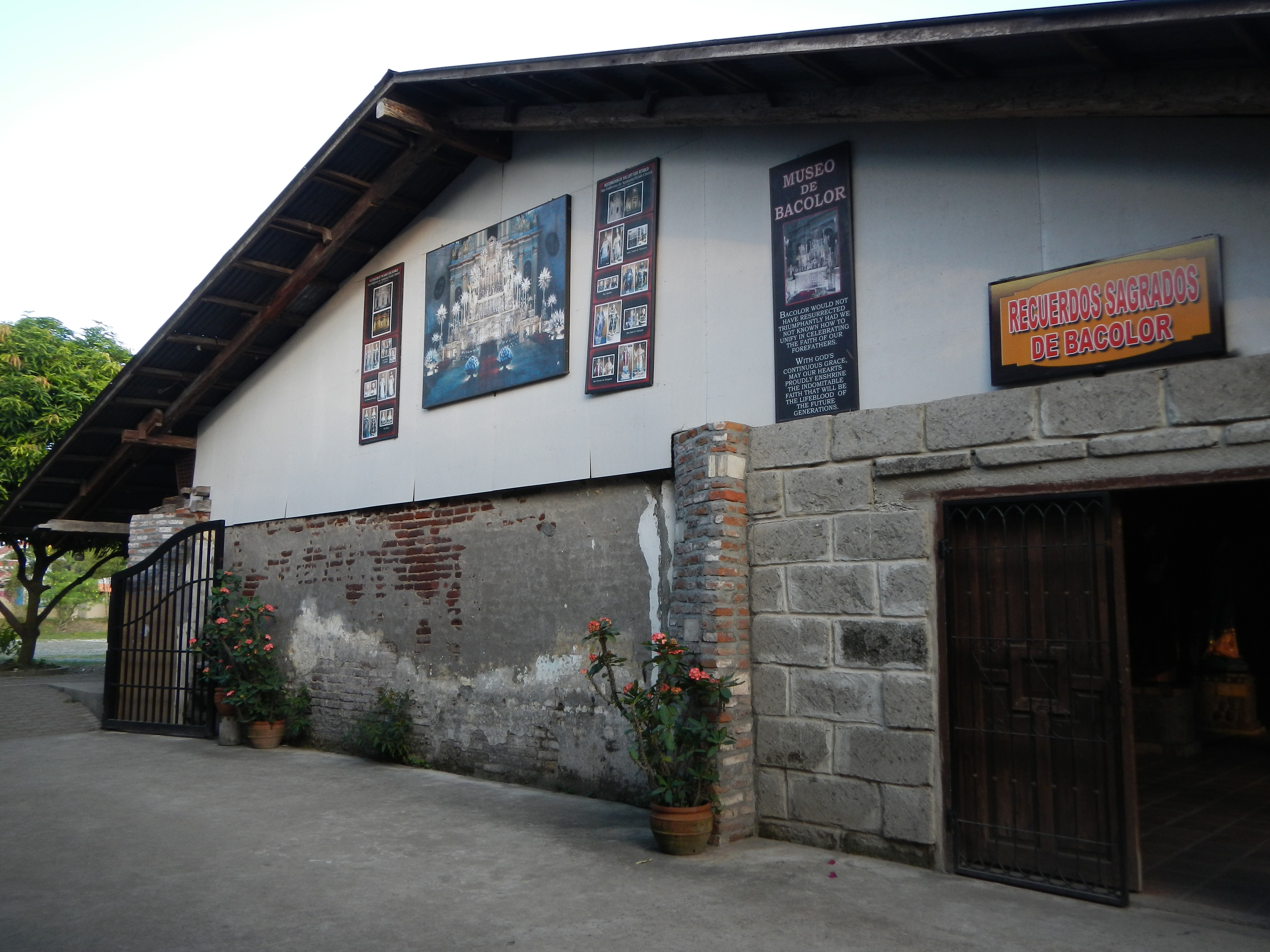
Museo de Bacolor

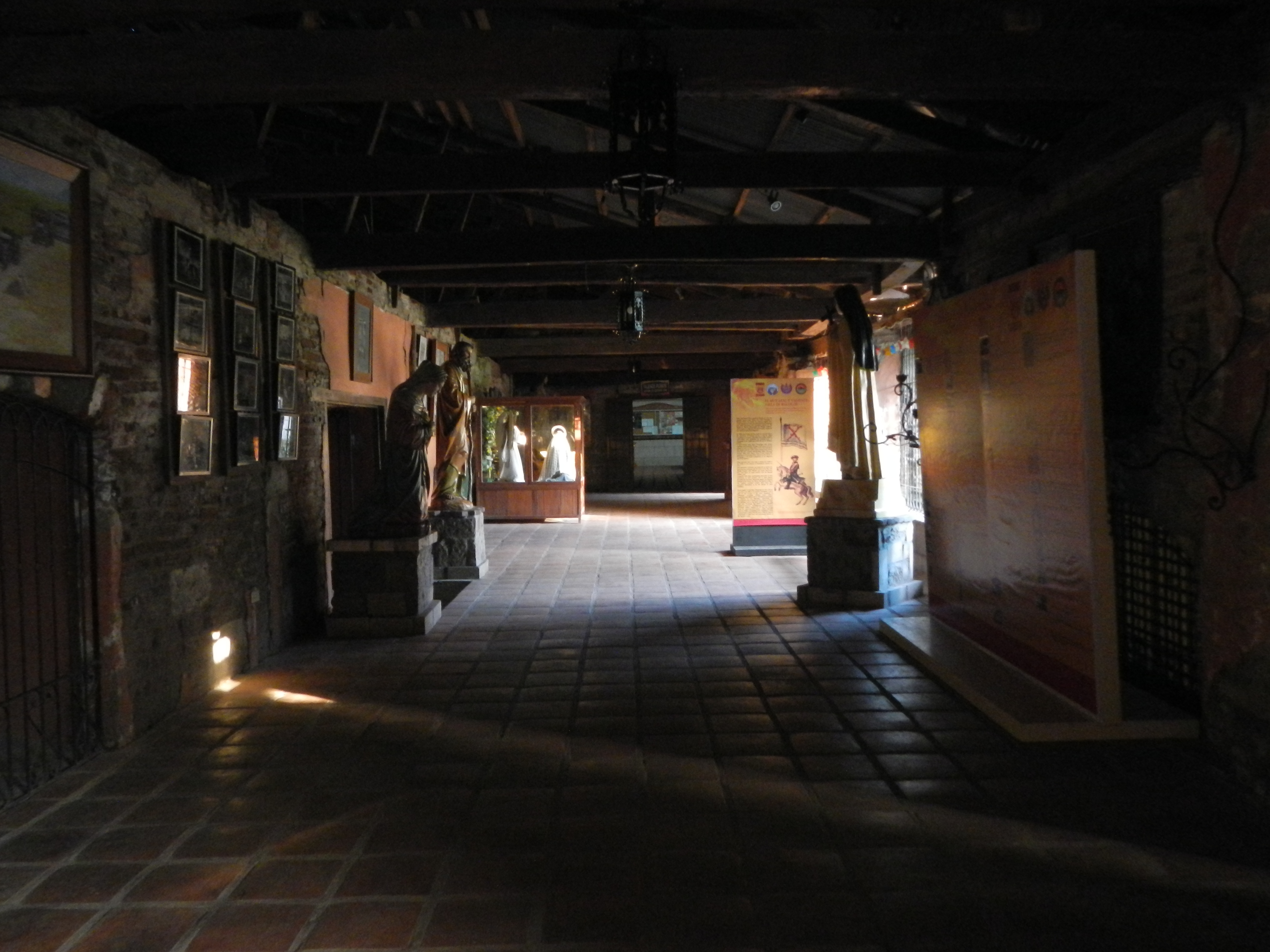
Interior

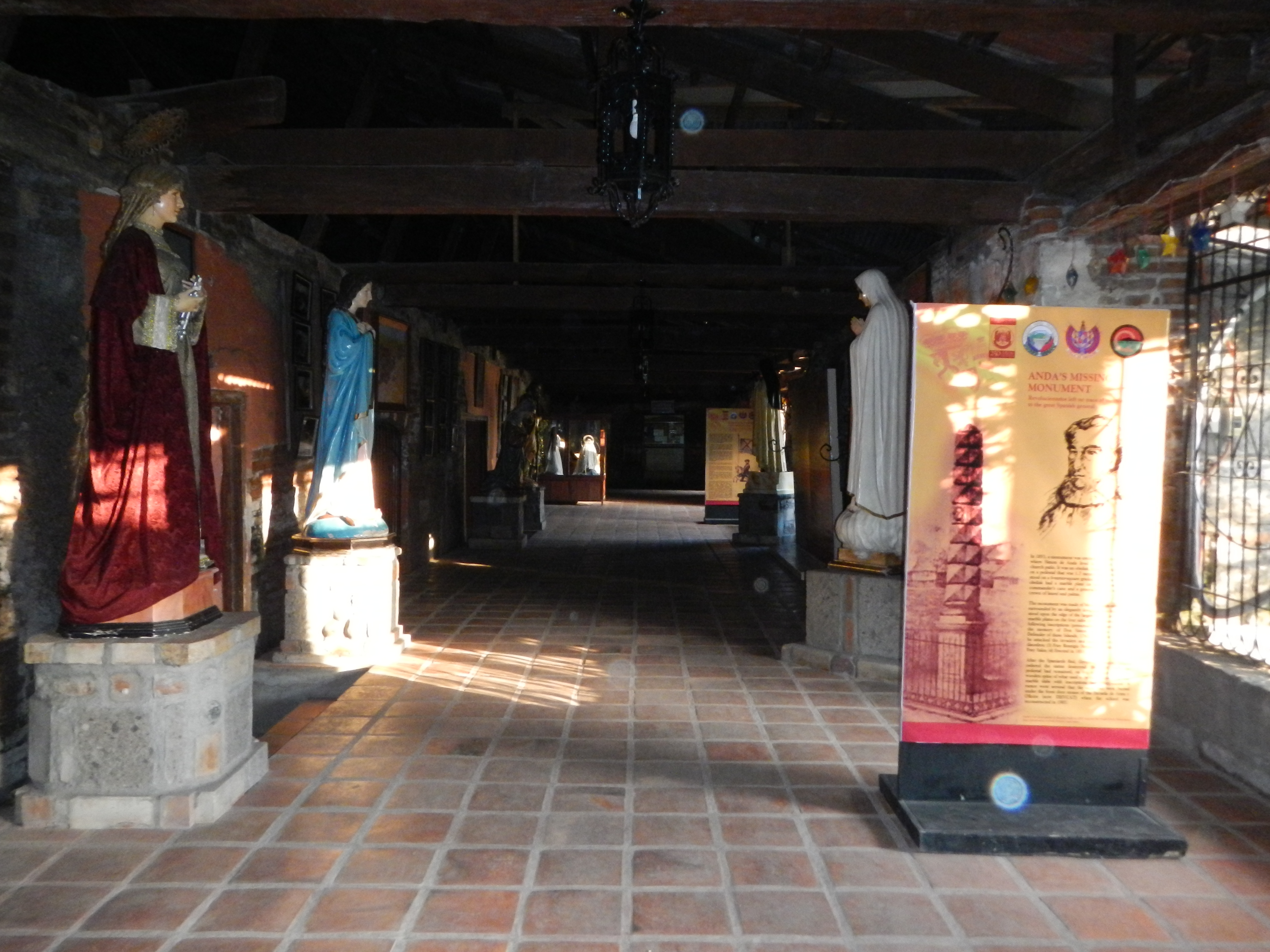
The Recuerdos and Icons

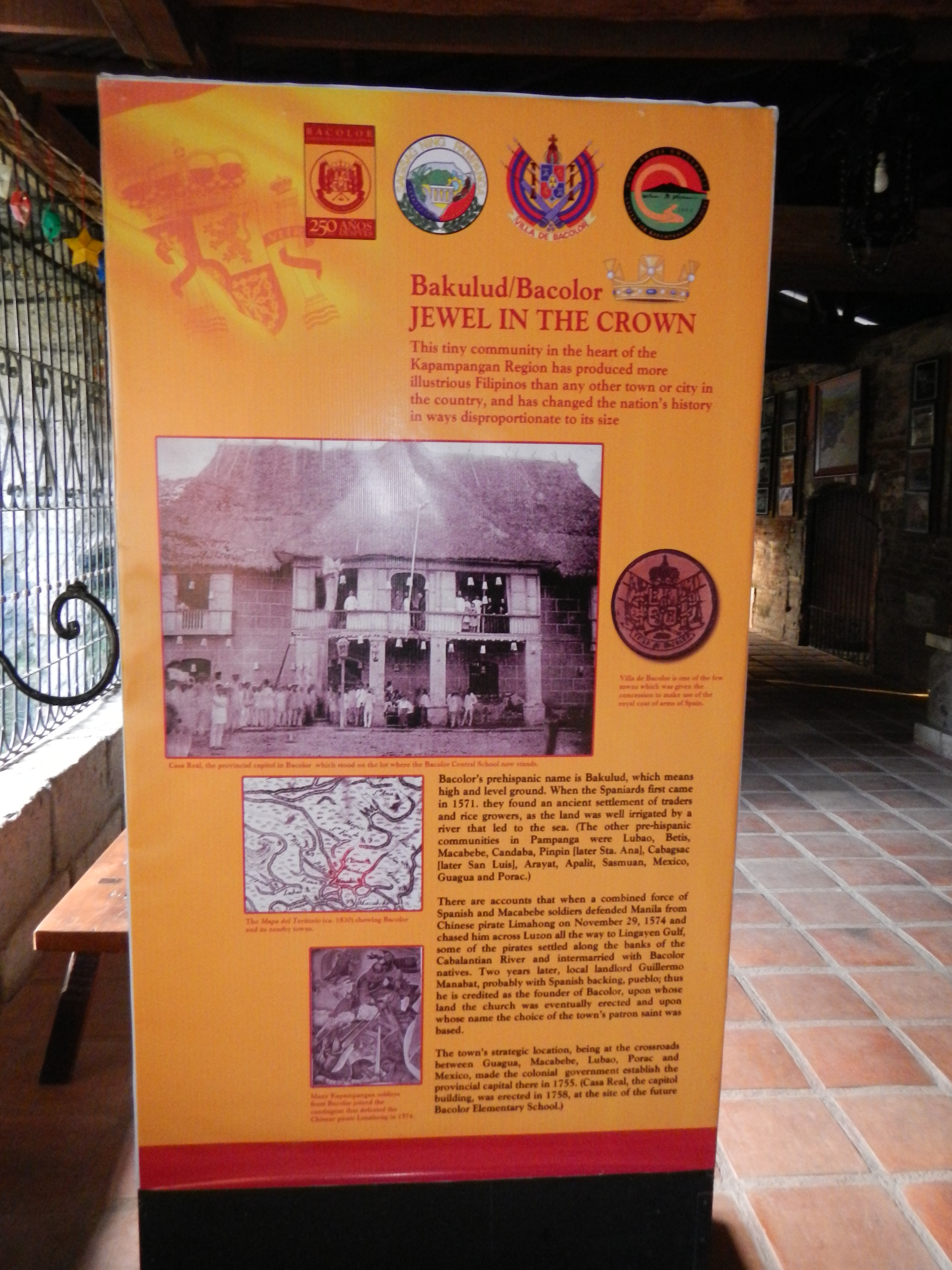
Jewel in the Crown

== Media ==
This heritage church is part of the main venue for taping of ABS-CBN primetime show May Bukas Pa from January 15, 2009, to February 5, 2010, using the church as their Monastery. The production crew of May Bukas Pa was allowed by Fr. Jesus Manabat Jr. since the show's story has religious themes, and letting the crew film there helped in the maintenance and repair of the whole church compound. The Filipino Channel's aid in exposure led to an influx of foreigners and locals visiting the church.

The church also made appearances in various films such as the 1996 movie Istokwa and the 2006 movie Summer Heat by Viva Films.

== Gallery ==
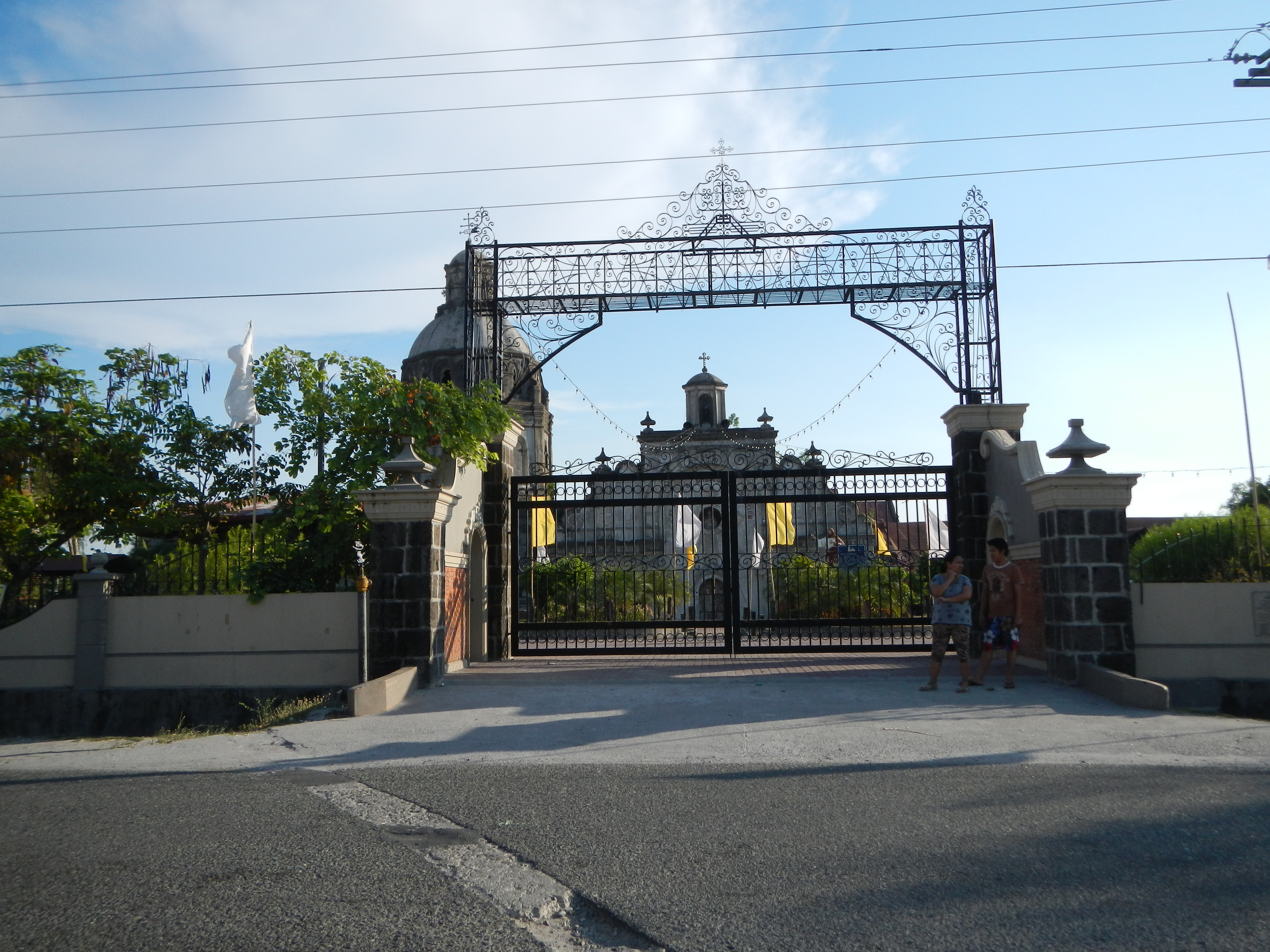
Church main gate

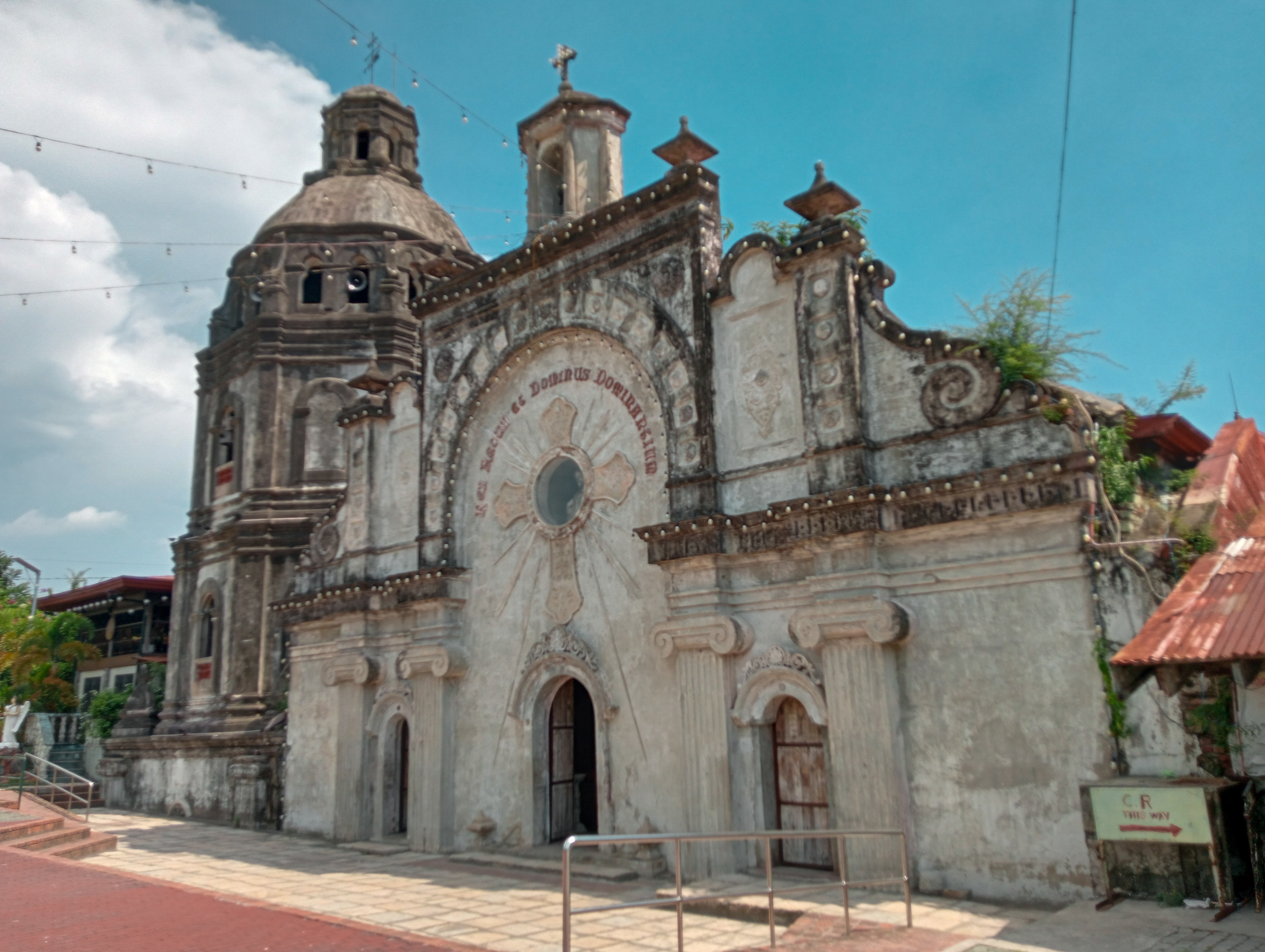
Close up view of the facade

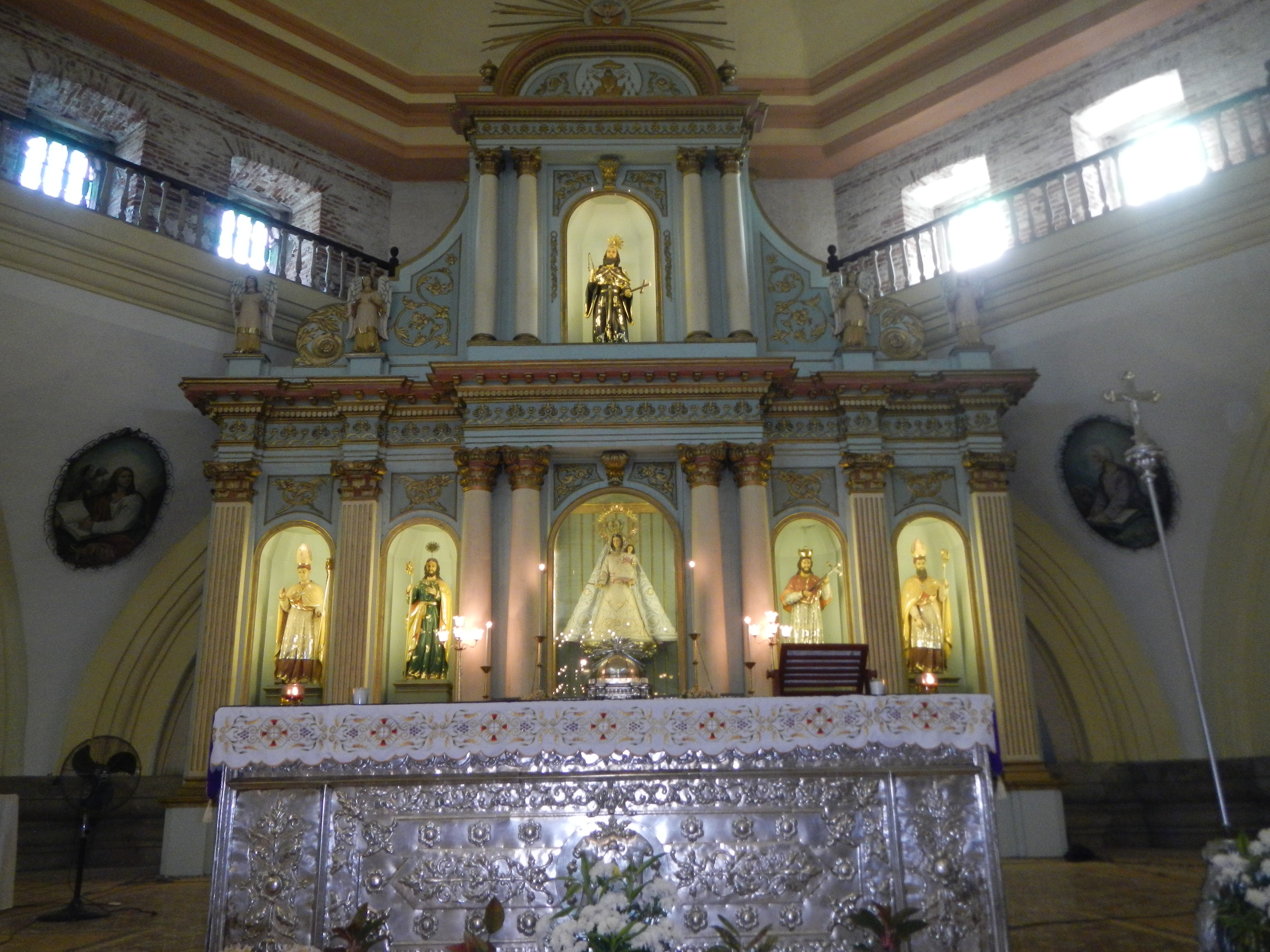
Main altar and reredos

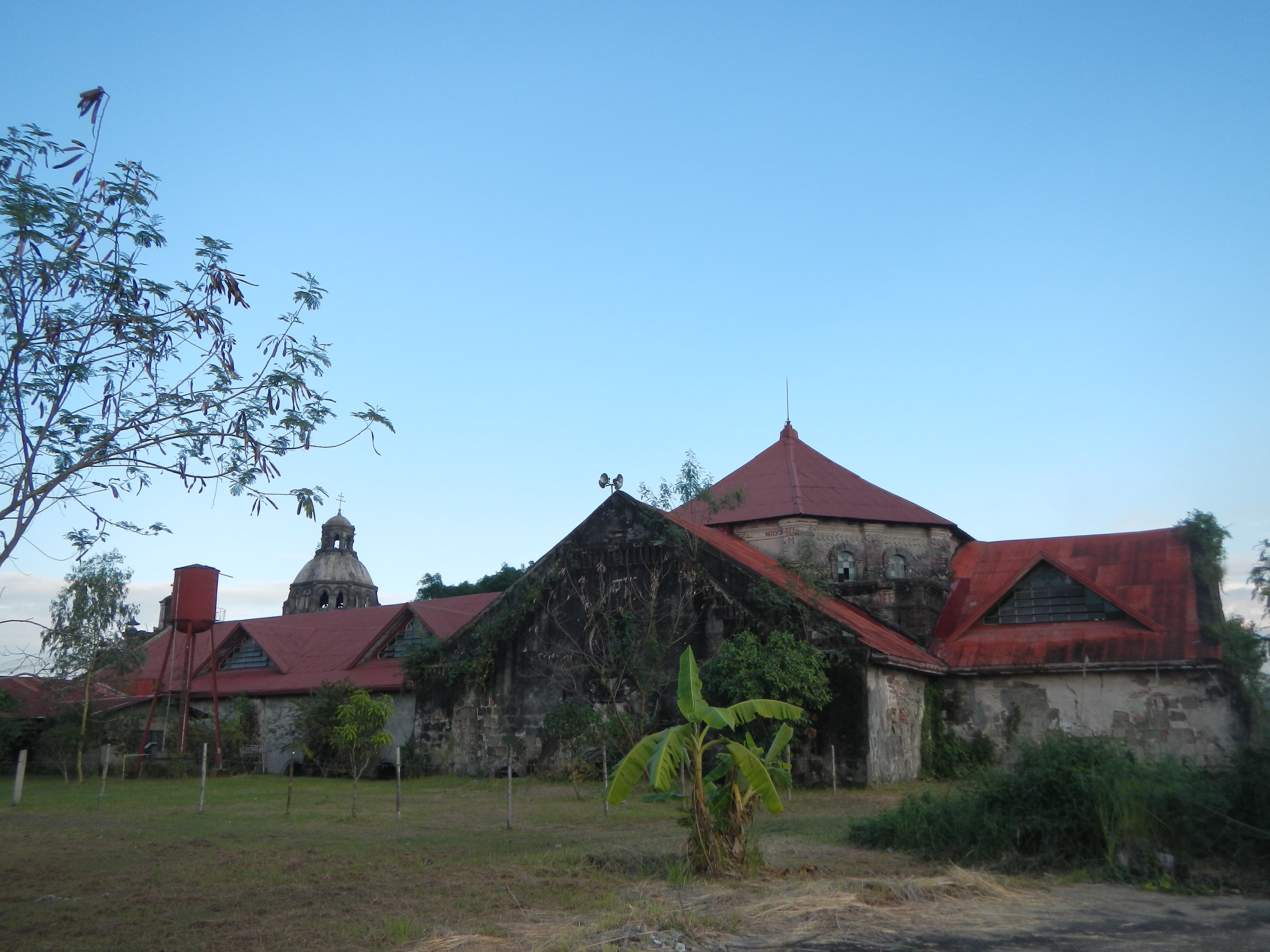
Rear view of the church

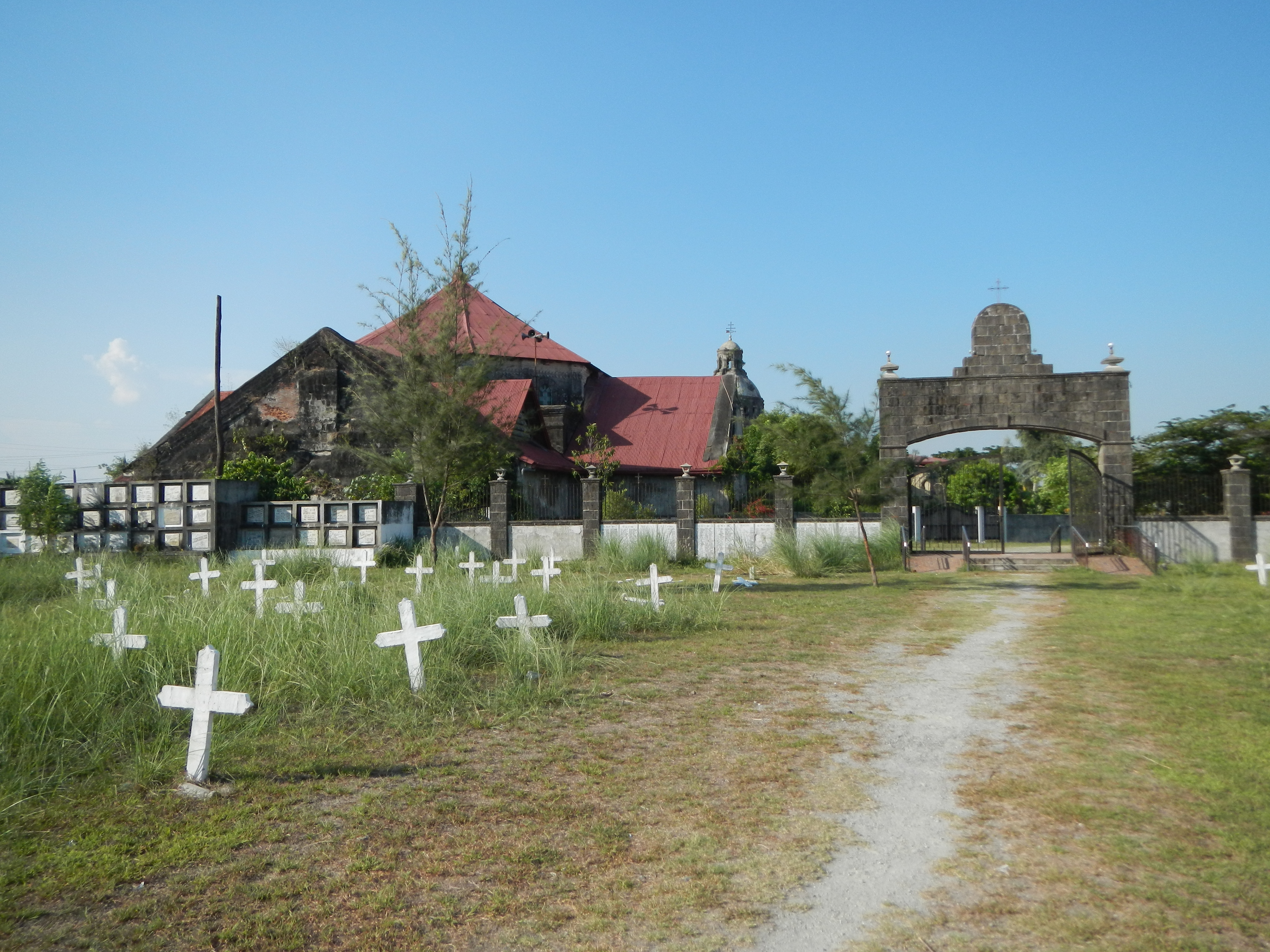
Catholic cemetery

La Naval de Bacolor
