= Bacolor =

Municipality in Pampanga, Philippines

- Municipality
- Municipality of Bacolor
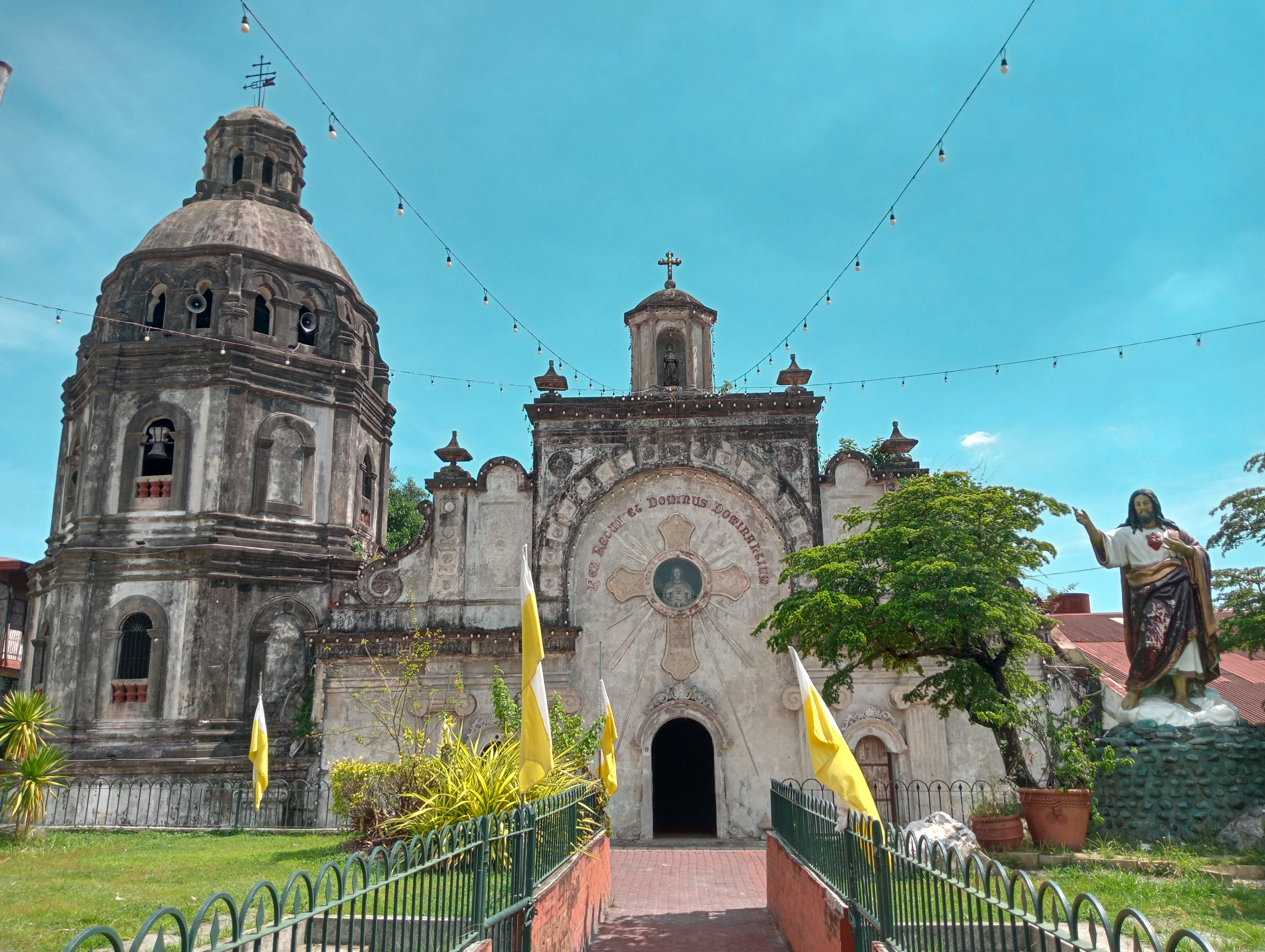
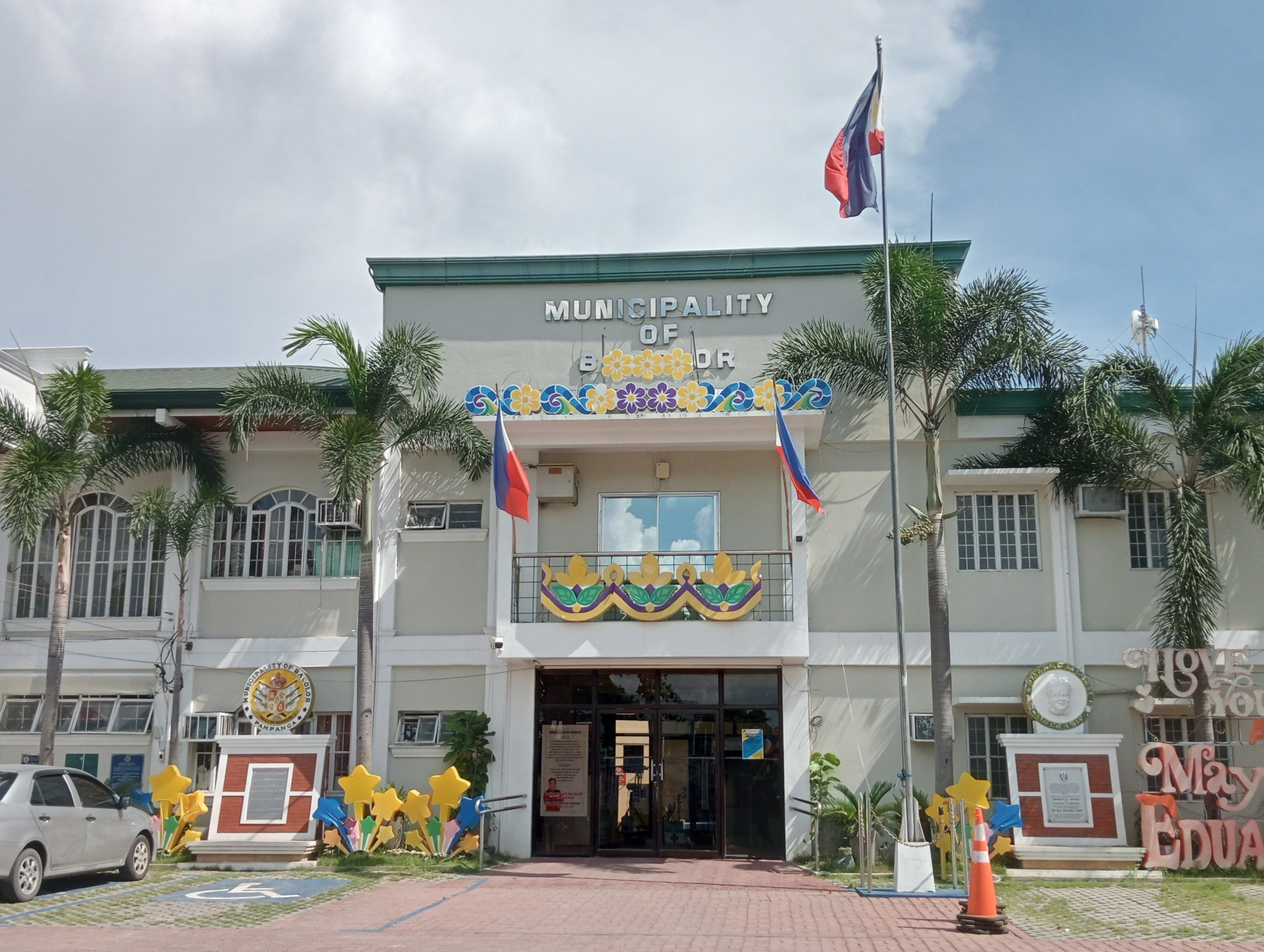
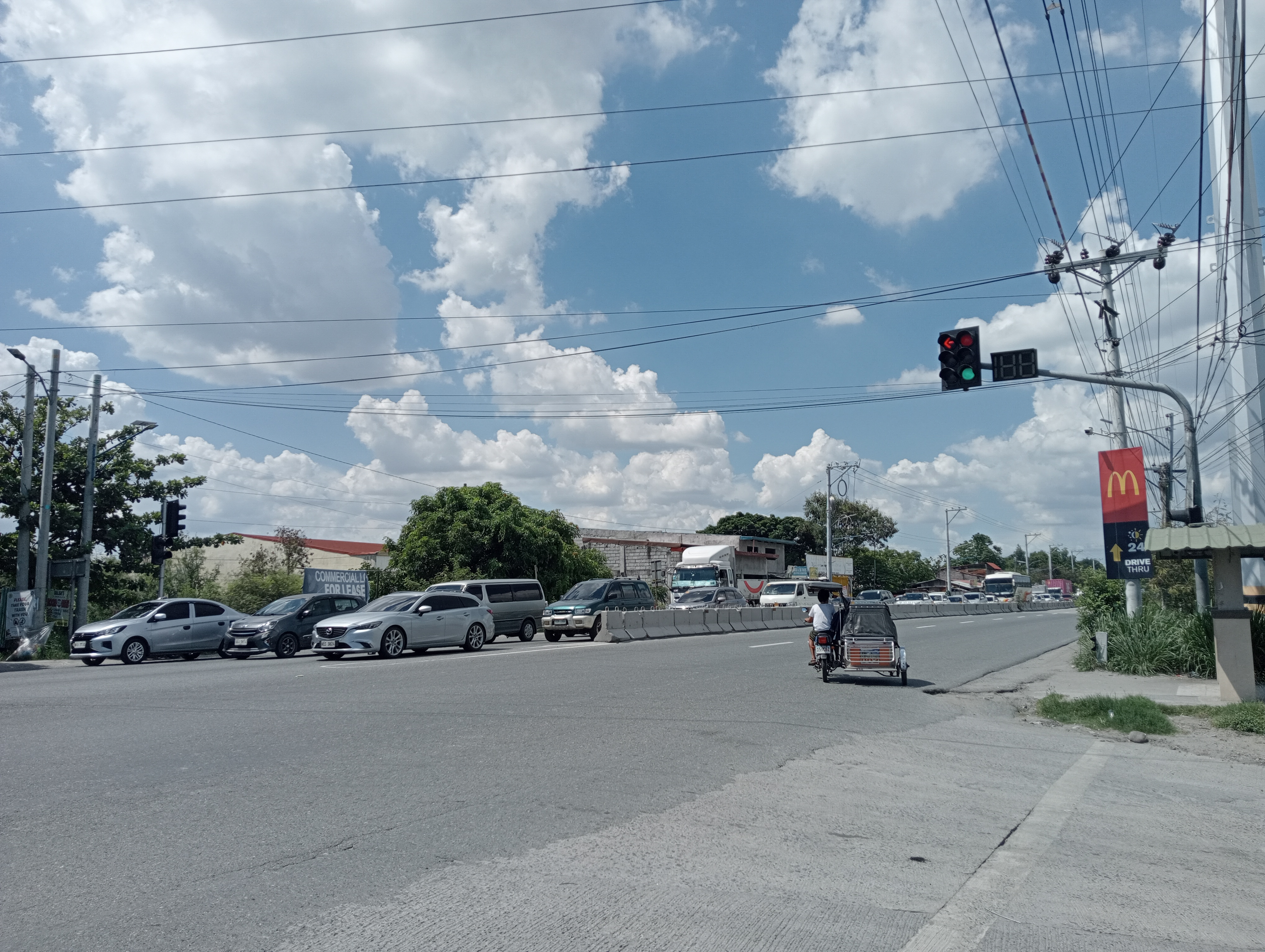
- San Guillermo Parish Church Bacolor Municipal Hall Jose Abad Santos Avenue in Bacolor

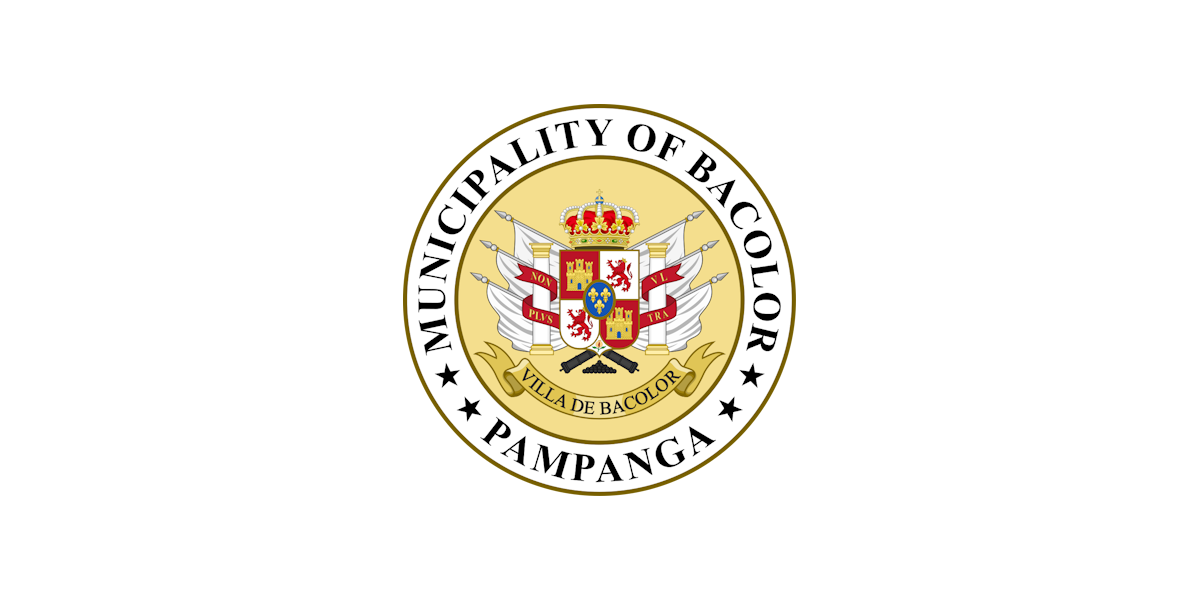
- Flag Seal
- Etymology: Level ground
- Nickname: Athens of Pampanga
- Motto: "Non Plus Ultra" (English: "No Further Beyond")
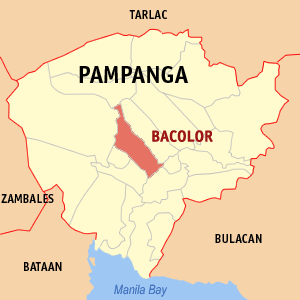
- Map of Pampanga with Bacolor highlighted
- Interactive map of Bacolor
- Location within the Philippines
- Coordinates: 14°59′54″N 120°39′10″E
- Country: Philippines
- Region: Central Luzon
- Province: Pampanga
- District: 3rd district
- Founded: October 8, 1762
- Barangays: 21 (see Barangays)

Government
  - Type: Sangguniang Bayan
  - Mayor: Eduardo "Diman" G. Datu
  - Vice Mayor: Ron Earvin E. Dungca
  - Representative: Alyssa Michaela M. Gonzales
  - Councilors: Members: Angelina C. Angeles; Jude Edward P. Datu; Jo Derek P. Hizon; Efren S. Blanco; Carlito T. Laxa; Renz Louie M. Canlas; Aiza Mae K. Cunanan; Emily M. Batac-Valerio
  - Electorate: 49,890 voters (2025)

Area
  - Total: 71.70 km^{2} (27.68 sq mi)
- Elevation: 11 m (36 ft)
- Highest elevation: 53 m (174 ft)
- Lowest elevation: −3 m (−9.8 ft)

Population (2024 census)
  - Total: 59,361
  - Density: 827.9/km^{2} (2,144/sq mi)
  - Households: 11,679

Economy
  - Income class: 1st municipal income class
  - Poverty incidence: 5.24% (2023)
  - Revenue: ₱ 346.2 million (2024)
  - Assets: ₱ 1,102 million (2024)
  - Expenditure: ₱ 277.1 million (2024)
  - Liabilities: ₱ 370 million (2024)

Service provider
  - Electricity: Pampanga 2 Electric Cooperative (PELCO 2)
- Time zone: UTC+8 (PST)
- ZIP code: 2001
- PSGC: 0305404000
- IDD : area code: +63 (0)45
- Native languages: Kapampangan; Tagalog
- Website: www.bacolorpampanga.gov.ph

Bacolor, officially the Municipality of Bacolor (Kapampangan: Balen ning Bakúlud; Tagalog: Bayan ng Bacolor), is a municipality in the province of Pampanga, Philippines. According to the 2024 census, it has a population of 59,361 people.

Bacolor is the birthplace of Father Anselmo Jorge de Fajardo, considered the "Father of Kapampangan literature" for writing the 1831 Kapampangan "kumidya" Don Gonzalo de Cordova.

== History ==
=== Spanish Colonial Era ===
Historical records show that Bacolor has been in existence as a proposed settlement as early as 1571, the same year Manila was founded by the Spanish. The original name of the settlement was Bakúlud, which became Hispanicized as "Bacolor" (cf. Bacolod and Bacoor). The original name is Kapampangan for "high level rocky place" or "plateau."

Bacolor officially became the capital of Pampanga in 1755. According to Spanish chronicler Fray Gaspar de San Agustín, before 1755, Mexico town “es la corte de Pampanga,” while Bacolor “es la capital” and Guagua “es igualmente.” Historian Dr. Luciano Santiago theorizes that before Bacolor was formally recognized as the provincial capital, it was already functioning as such, although other provincial administrative offices were elsewhere in Mexico and Guagua.

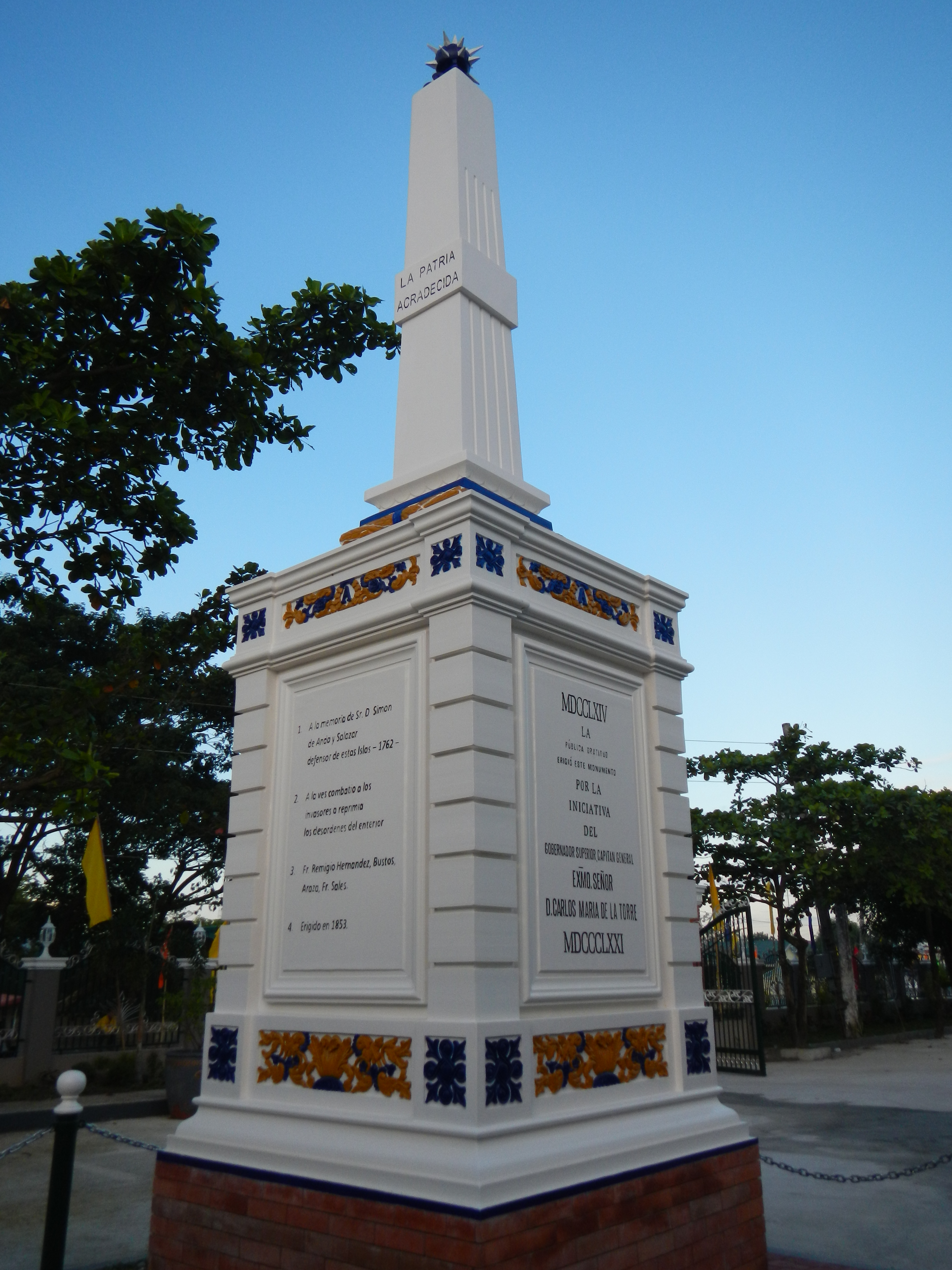
Monument to Simón de Anda y Salazar in Bacolor

During the British occupation of Manila, when Manila and the Port of Cavite fell to the Kingdom of Great Britain in the Seven Years’ War, Bacolor became the capital of the government-in-exile under Governor-General Simón de Anda y Salazar from October 6, 1762, to May 30, 1764. The provincial offices were temporarily moved to Factoría (now San Isidro, Nueva Ecija). Through a decree of King Charles III of Spain on November 9, 1765, Bacolor became Villa de Bacólor, one of the only three villas in the Philippines, and received a coat-of-arms. Simón de Anda organized an army of natives for the defense of Bacolor with the aim of recapturing British-held Manila.

=== American colonial era ===
Bacolor remained the capital of Pampanga until the provincial seat of government was transferred to neighboring San Fernando in 1904. Moves to transfer the provincial capital to San Fernando actually began as early as 1852 with an expediente from the alcalde mayor. Charles III granted the request in a real cédula dated September 11, 1881. Despite royal approval, the transfer was not formally enacted until August 15, 1904, by virtue of Act No. 1204.

The coming of the United States as a coloniser broke up the military form of government and instead political and economic reforms were introduced. A civil form of government was organized and was inaugurated on February 13, 1901, Commissioner William H. Taft at the old Escuela de Artes y Oficios de Bacólor, later known as the Pampanga School of Arts and Trade and now Pampanga State University, the first state university in Pampanga.

The first provincial Civil Governor was Don Ceferino Joven and the first Municipal President of Bacolor was Don Estanislao Santos.

=== Japanese occupation ===
When the Second World War broke out, Imperial Japanese fighter and bomber planes invaded Bacolor in December 1941 until the town was occupied by Imperial Japanese forces in 1942. Pampangan guerrillas and Hukbalahap Communist groups joined in an insurgency centered around the municipality, supported by local soldiers and military officers of the Philippine Commonwealth Army. Their attacks against the Japanese occupation continued until 1945, when Filipino and American forces liberated Bacolor.

=== Philippine independence ===
During the Hukbalahap Rebellion, the barrio of Maliwalu became the site of a massacre by pro-government paramilitaries in which 21 farmers were killed in retaliation for the killing of an anti-Huk commander on April 7, 1950. The resulting uproar led to the reelection defeat of Pampanga governor Jose B. Lingad, who received protection from the paramilitaries.

In 1956, the sitio of Mesalipit was converted into a barrio.

Due to the eruption of Mount Pinatubo on June 15, 1991, the municipality was struck by lahar flows from 1991 to 1995, burying the town by 20 feet (6.1 m), killing hundreds of people, and destroying livelihoods. Eighteen out of the 21 barangays of Bacolor were buried. The lahar from Mount Pinatubo raised the town to its current level of 20 m (66 ft) above sea level. Subsidence caused the constant reclaiming of parts of Pampanga by the sea.

=== Bacolor before Martial Law ===
The history of Bacolor, Pampanga, before the declaration of Martial Law in 1972 is a complex reflection of colonial governance, the evolution of religious institutions, and the health and social challenges experienced in the Philippines. While details concerning Ferdinand Blumentrit and Guillermo Manaba are part of local tradition and municipal records, an examination of historical literature sheds light on the broader context in which Bacolor emerged as a center of power and culture in Central Luzon. Bacolor served as the first capital of the province of Pampanga for nearly two centuries, a position that reinforced its role as the political and economic heart of the region before the capital was transferred to San Fernando (Hollnsteiner, 1961).

Bacolor, before the Martial Law, served as the provincial capital of Pampanga before it was transferred to the city of San Fernando (Municipality of Bacolor, 2016; Viray, 2023). Despite this, Bacolor still held its reputation as the cultural heart of Central Luzon, maintaining its rich heritage, literature, and artistry as celebrated and regarded by its residents (Gonzales, 2006). As a religious community, Bacolor's community life revolved around San Guillermo Parish Church, serving as a landmark and a pillar of the town where festivals, religious ceremonies, and traditions were held, and where the identity of the community was preserved (Municipality of Bacolor, 2016).

Upon the arrival of the American colonizers, the education and civic transformation of Bacolor occurred (Love for Life Foundation, 2022). This has allowed for the evolution of literacy, especially in the English language, and in the introduction of the democratic principles to the community. The foundation of which was built on the then Escuela de Artes y Oficios de Bacolor, which was later named Pampanga State University, serving as an important educational institution of the community (Love for Life Foundation, 2022; Municipality of Bacolor, 2016).

The establishment of Bacolor is deeply rooted in the history of Christianization and colonial administration in the Philippines. The reference to 1571 as the year when “Baculud” was discovered and its establishment in 1574 reflect the early period of Spanish colonization, when missionaries and government officials established village communities or pueblos to facilitate control and conversion (Brown, 1965). San Guillermo Church, built on the land of Guillermo Manaba, was not merely a religious structure but also a symbol of the sociocultural transition in which indigenous leaders became integral to the formation of a new social order (Méndez, 1970). During this period, the church served as a center of community life, where festivals and religious ceremonies became mechanisms for unity and the preservation of order under Spanish rule (Brown, 1970).

In terms of medicine and public health, life in Bacolor and Pampanga as a whole was long affected by inadequate modern sanitation and the spread of infectious diseases. However, by the middle of the 20th century, the country's public health conditions gradually began to change. The establishment of the World Health Organization (WHO) office in the Philippines in 1948 and the implementation of national programs to control infectious diseases contributed to this development. During the 1950s and 1960s, extensive vaccination campaigns were carried out, including BCG vaccination against tuberculosis and programs against polio. As a result, some diseases that had previously posed serious threats to communities were gradually brought under control and their spread reduced (World Health Organization, n.d.).

The economy of Bacolor before 1972 was traditionally based on agriculture, particularly rice and sugar cultivation, which sustained families and shaped the social structure. Farmers relied on their harvests to meet their daily needs, but they were often affected by changes in government policies and the global market (Friend, 1963). The transfer of the provincial capital from Bacolor to San Fernando marked a shift in economic and political dynamics, as San Fernando gradually became the more dominant center of commerce and administration. Nevertheless, Bacolor remained important as a cultural and historical center, where traditions and heritage from the colonial period continued to be celebrated and preserved by its residents.

In the fields of education and society, the arrival of the Americans at the beginning of the 20th century brought significant changes. The establishment of schools under the American system opened new opportunities for young people in Bacolor, allowing them to learn English and acquire skills applicable to modern society (Marquardt, 1945). This transition from the Spanish to the American educational system resulted in a hybrid culture, where indigenous customs were combined with ideas of democracy and modernity (Krieger, 1945). Students attending school and families participating in community life became part of this broader process of transformation, in which education became a key to development and an improved standard of living.

Challenges to security and social stability were also an important part of Bacolor's history. Central Luzon, including Pampanga, was known as a center of rebel movements such as the Hukbalahap during the mid-20th century, which caused unrest and instability in communities (Mitchell, 1969). Farmers and ordinary citizens in Bacolor often found themselves caught in conflicts between rebels and the government, resulting in fear and distrust toward public institutions (McColl, 1969). These experiences shaped people's perceptions of the government and their own ability to change their circumstances, forming part of the background to the events that eventually led to the declaration of Martial Law in 1972.

== Geography ==
Bacolor is 9 kilometres (5.6 mi) from San Fernando, 26 kilometres (16 mi) from Angeles, and 75 kilometres (47 mi) from Manila.

=== Barangays ===
Bacolor is politically subdivided into 21 barangays, as shown below. Each barangay consists of puroks and some have sitios.

- Balas
- Cabalantian
- Cabambangan (Poblacion)
- Cabetican
- Calibutbut
- Concepcion
- Dolores
- Duat
- Macabacle
- Magliman
- Maliwalu
- Mesalipit
- Parulog
- Potrero
- San Antonio
- San Isidro
- San Vicente
- Santa Barbara
- Santa Ines
- Talba
- Tinajero

=== Climate ===
Climate data for Bacolor, Pampanga
Month	Jan	Feb	Mar	Apr	May	Jun	Jul	Aug	Sep	Oct	Nov	Dec	Year
Mean daily maximum °C (°F)	30 (86)	31 (88)	33 (91)	34 (93)	33 (91)	31 (88)	29 (84)	29 (84)	29 (84)	30 (86)	31 (88)	30 (86)	31 (87)
Mean daily minimum °C (°F)	19 (66)	20 (68)	21 (70)	23 (73)	25 (77)	25 (77)	25 (77)	25 (77)	24 (75)	23 (73)	22 (72)	20 (68)	23 (73)
Average precipitation mm (inches)	8 (0.3)	9 (0.4)	15 (0.6)	34 (1.3)	138 (5.4)	203 (8.0)	242 (9.5)	233 (9.2)	201 (7.9)	126 (5.0)	50 (2.0)	21 (0.8)	1,280 (50.4)
Average rainy days	3.7	4.1	6.5	11.2	21.2	24.9	27.7	26.5	25.5	21.8	12.6	5.6	191.3
Source: Meteoblue

== Demographics ==
Population census of Bacolor

Year	Pop.	±% p.a.
1903	13,493	—
1918	15,302	+0.84%
1939	19,129	+1.07%
1948	22,920	+2.03%
1960	29,634	+2.16%
1970	40,212	+3.10%
1975	46,044	+2.75%
1980	50,942	+2.04%

Year	Pop.	±% p.a.
1990	67,259	+2.82%
1995	13,097	−26.40%
2000	16,147	+4.59%
2007	25,238	+6.35%
2010	31,508	+8.41%
2015	39,460	+4.38%
2020	48,066	+4.24%
2024	59,361	+5.20%

Source: Philippine Statistics Authority

In the 2024 census, the population of Bacolor was 59,361 people, with a density of 830 inhabitants per square kilometre or 2,100 inhabitants per square mile.

== Economy ==
Poverty incidence of Bacolor (%)

Source: Philippine Statistics Authority

== Government ==
=== Local government ===
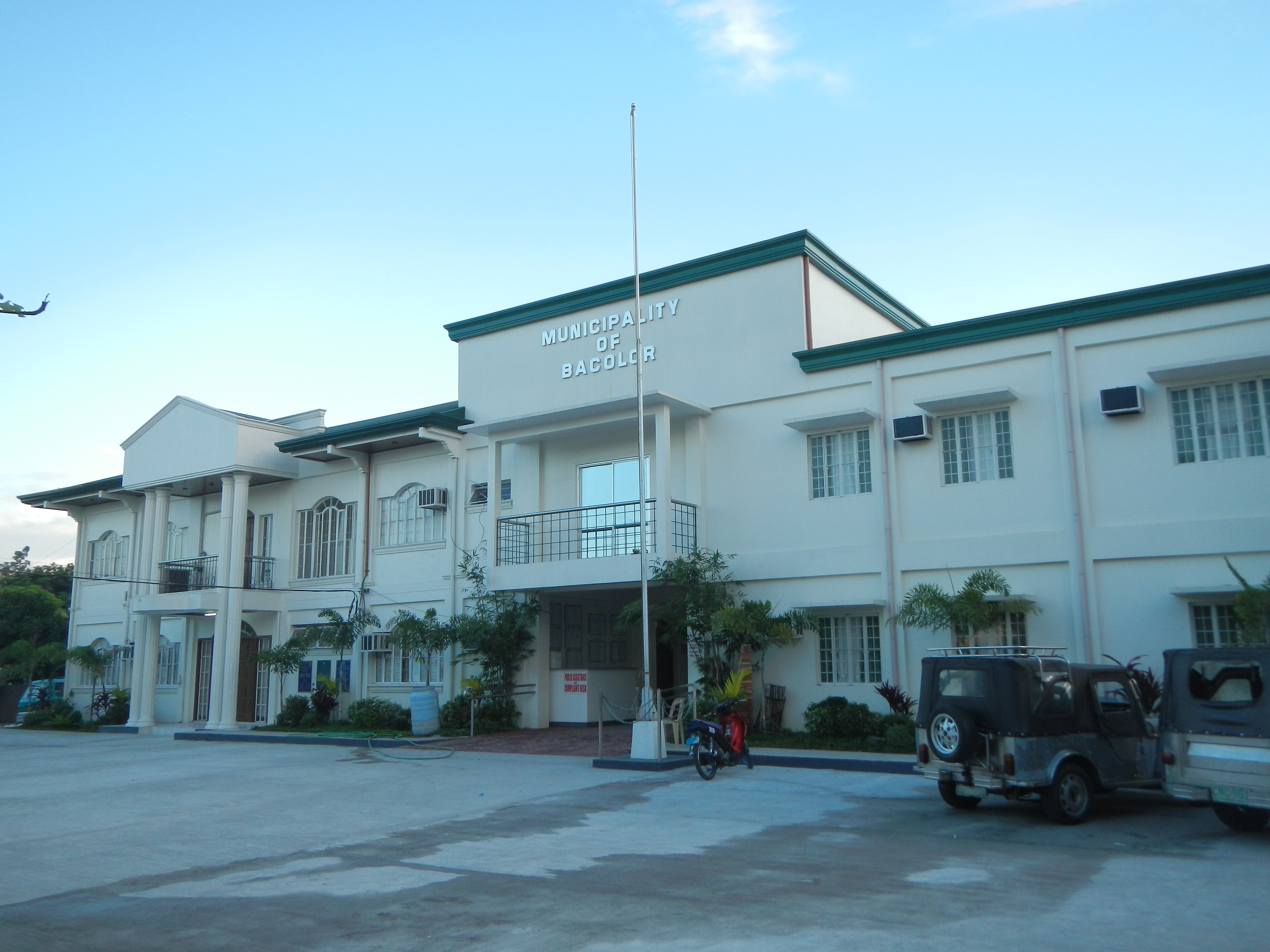
Façade of the town hall

Like other towns in the Philippines, Bacolor is governed by a mayor and vice mayor who are elected to three-year terms. The mayor is the executive head and leads the town's departments in executing the ordinances and improving public services. The vice mayor heads a legislative council (Sangguniang Bayan) consisting of councilors from the barangays or barrios.

=== Town hall ===
The municipal building is the former site of the Venturas house, one of Bacolor's most prominent families. On July 8, 1953, the new town hall was completed during the tenure of Mayor Manuel de Jesus. Its construction was a project of Senator Pablo Ángeles David, a native of Bacolor.

== Tourism ==
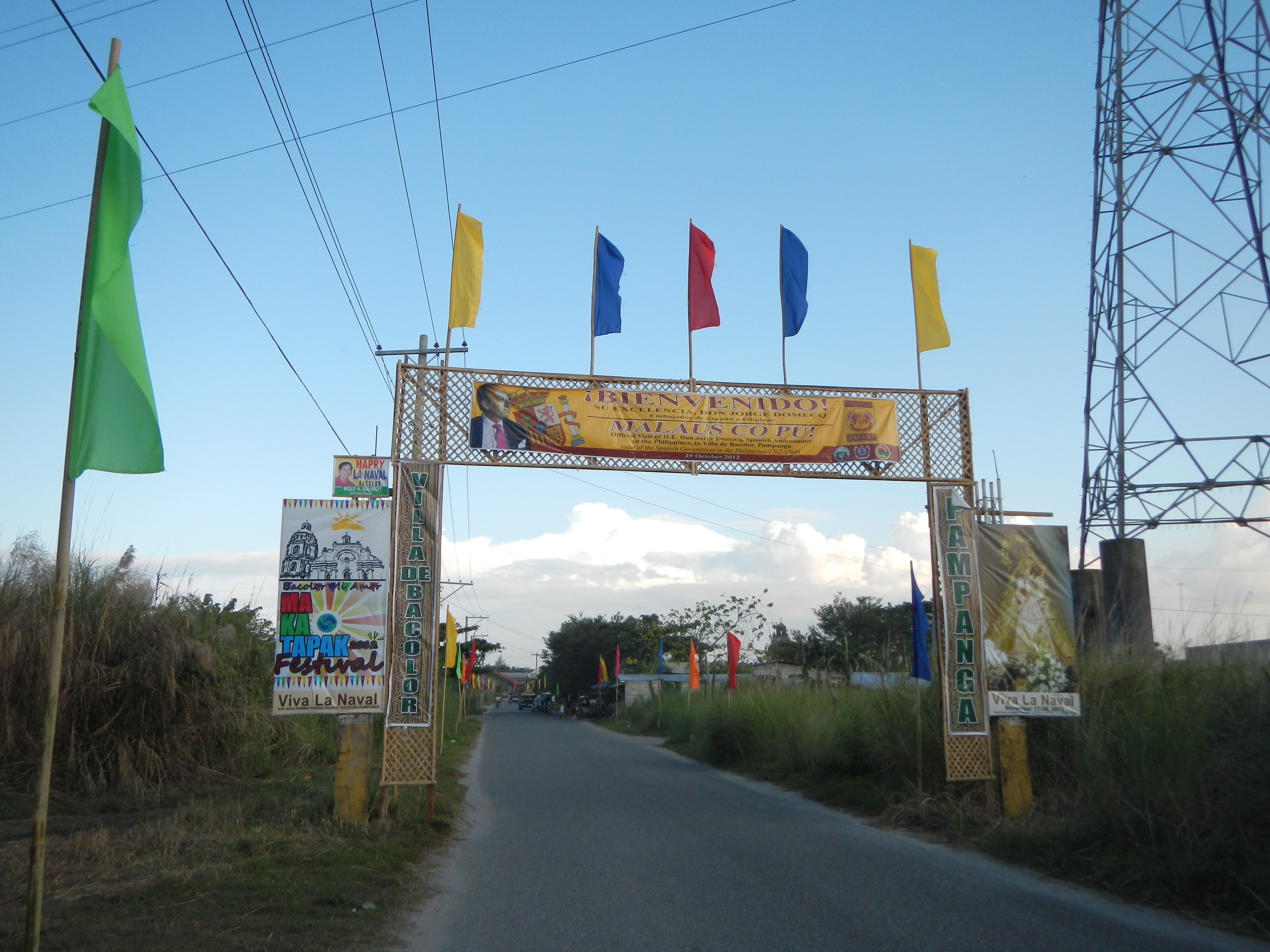
Welcome arch

The main landmark of the town is the San Guillermo Parish Church known as the 'sunken church', one of the structures that was half-buried by the lava flow from the eruption of Mount Pinatubo in 1991. The church has since been renovated and is currently operational and may be accessed through what were once the second floor windows, now converted into doorways. The sunken church and town of Bacolor served as the main production location of the 2009–2010 ABS-CBN religious-oriented television series May Bukas Pa from January 15, 2009 to February 5, 2010.

It also made appearances in various media before its prominent one on May Bukas Pa, such as the 1996 movie Istokwa, 2006 movie Summer Heat and 2008 movie Jay, and in the music video of the song Promise Me by J Brothers. The Shrine of Our Lady of Lourdes in Cabetican is also famous for its annual pilgrimage and barrio fiestas.

Other notable landmarks in Bacolor include Memorial Kilometer Posts of the Bataan Death March along the Old National Road, the oldest trade school in Far East, the Pampanga State University; the Simón de Anda y Salazar monument at the town hall; monument to the Kapampangan writer and revolutionary leader Juan Crisostomo Soto (1867–1918); and Monument to Felix Galura Y Napao.

Bacolor's festivals are the Feast of San Guillermo and Nuestra Senora del Santissimo Rosario (La Naval) which are celebrated every 10th day of February and 3rd Sunday of November, respectively.

=== The Sunken Shrine ===
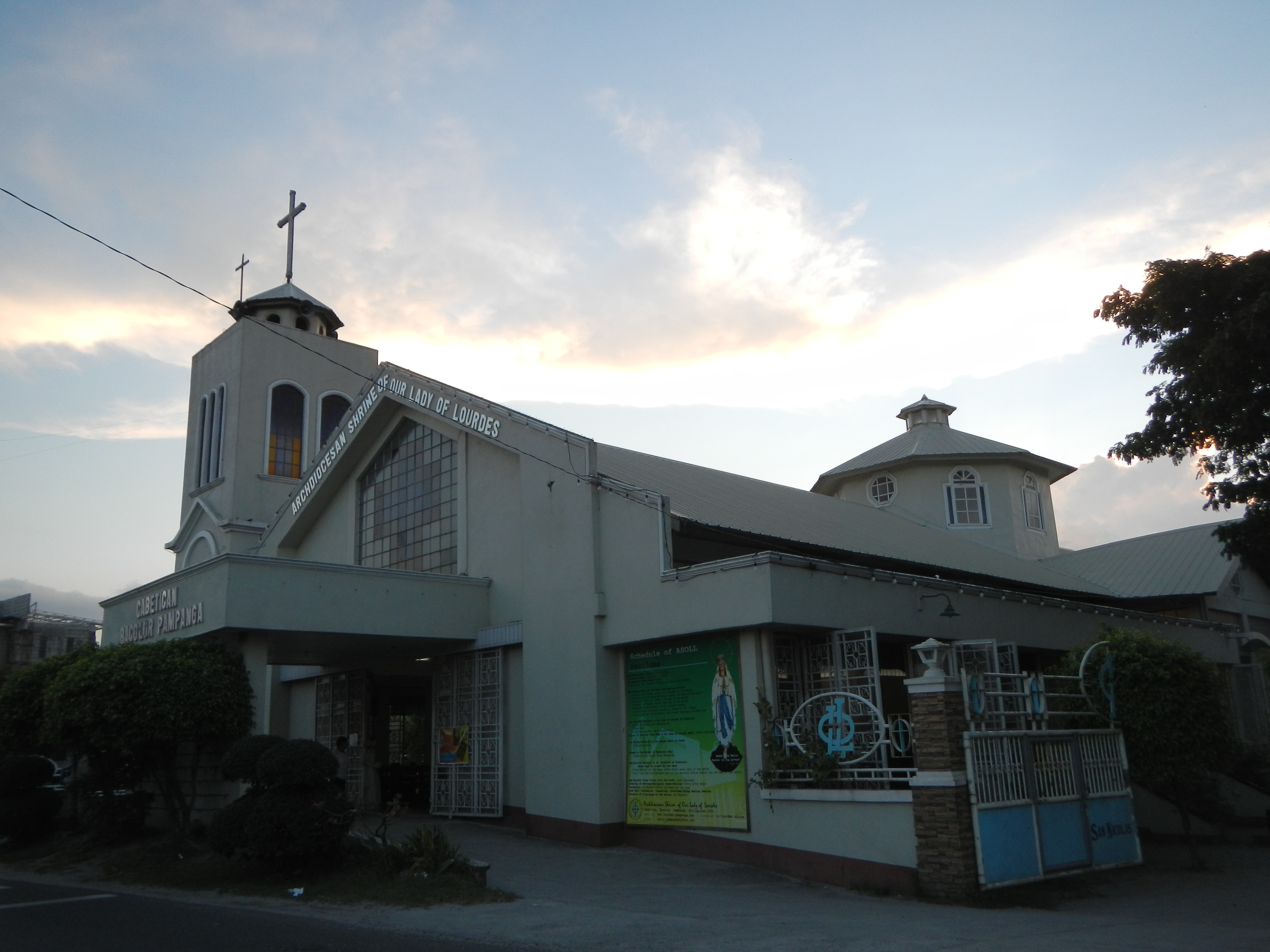
Original Archdiocesan Shrine of Our Lady of Lourdes (the Sunken Shrine is to the right, not in photo).

Buried by the devastating lahar flows of Mount Pinatubo eruption in June 1991, the Archdiocesan Shrine of Our Lady of Lourdes of Cabetican (abbreviated as "Maluca"), now more popularly known as the Sunken Shrine of Our Lady of Lourdes of Cabetican, remains at the center of the Marian Concordia Pilgrimages and Healing in Pampanga. Originally built as an annex to the older, smaller shrine, it is under the care of Fr. Ronnie Cao, Healing Priest and Rector of the Archdiocesan Shrine.

== Education ==
There are two schools district offices which govern all educational institutions within the municipality. They oversee the management and operations of all private and public, from primary to secondary schools. Theres are the Bacolor North Schools District Office, and Bacolor South Schools District Office.

=== Primary and elementary schools ===
- Bacolor Elementary School (Bulaon Resettlement)
- Bacolor Elementary School (Madapdap Resettlement)
- Bacolor Elementary School (Town Proper)
- Balas Elementary School
- Cabalantian Elementary School
- Cabalantian Elementary School (Town Proper)
- Cabetican Elementary School (Madapdap Resettlement)
- Cabetican Elementary School (Proper)
- Calibutbut Elementary School
- Concepcion Elementary School
- Dolores Elementary School
- Don Bosco Academy (Elementary)
- Duat Elementary School
- Eliseo Belen Elementary School
- Eliseo Belen Elementary School (Annex)
- Maliwalu Elementary School
- Maliwalu Proper Elementary School
- Mesalipit Primary School
- NASAH Montessori Center of Learning
- Parulug Elementary School
- Potrero Elementary School
- San Antonio Elementary School (Bulaon)
- San Antonio Elementary School (Proper)
- San Isidro Elementary School
- Sta. Barbara Elementary School (Bulaon)
- Sta. Barbara Elementary School (Proper)
- Talba Elementary School
- Tinajero Elementary School
- Tinajero Elementary School (Madapdap Resettlement)

=== Secondary schools ===
- Bacolor High School
- Don Antonio Lee Chi Uan Integrated School
- Don Bosco Academy
- Potrero National High School
- San Isidro National High School
- Schoolville Academy for Young Learners

=== Higher educational institution ===
- Pampanga State University

== Notable personalities ==
- Mamerto Natividad, military leader
- Pablo Ángeles David, magistrate and statesman. During his career, he became a judge, a member of the Philippine House of Representatives, Governor of Pampanga and a member of the Senate of the Philippines.
- Francisco Tongio Liongson, former Senator
- Francisco Alonso Liongson, the son of Francisco Tongio Liongson
- Pedro Tongio Liongson, lawyer and member of the Malolos Congress
- Práxedes Fajardo, revolutionary
- Jayson Castro, professional basketball player currently playing in the Philippine Basketball Association.
- Zoilo Galang, writer
- Jesús Balmori, Spanish language journalist, playwright, and poet.
- Rosa del Rosario, actress
- Estelito Mendoza, lawyer who served as Solicitor General of the Philippines from 1972 to 1986. He served as Governor of Pampanga.
- Jordan Clarkson, Filipino-American professional basketball player
- Asunción Ventura, founder of Asilo de San Vicente de Paul

Preceded by Manila	Capital of the Spanish East Indies; 1762–1764	Succeeded by Manila
