= List of May Bukas Pa characters =

May Bukas Pa (transl. There's Still Tomorrow) is a Philippine drama television series produced by Dreamscape Entertainment Television and directed by Jerome Chavez Pobocan, Jojo A. Saguin, and Erick C. Salud. The series features an ensemble cast consisting of Zaijian Jaranilla, Albert Martinez, Dina Bonnevie, Tonton Gutierrez, Maja Salvador, Rayver Cruz, Dominic Ochoa, Desiree del Valle, Precious Lara Quigaman, Lito Pimentel, and Jaime Fabregas.

It aired on ABS-CBN's Primetime Bida block from February 2, 2009, to February 5, 2010, replacing Eva Fonda and was replaced by Agua Bendita, and on its sister channel Jeepney TV from March 11 to December 5, 2013, underwent two original airing versions, the first to do so before the 2023–2024's Linlang in the 2020s. The series is the highest rated program on Philippine television since switching to Kantar in 2009, and holds the record on the network's primetime block for the period from its premiere on February 2, 2009, to February 3, 2011, when the 2010–2011 series Mara Clara became the block's highest-rating show from 2011 to 2012. It is inspired by the 1955 Spanish film, Marcelino pan y vino. The series is also a revival of the 2000-2001 series of the same name.

The entire series is on YouTube and iWant, while the series' recap is also on YouTube.

== Overview ==
The series revolves around Santino (Zaijian Jaranilla), a wide-eyed young boy orphaned as a baby and was adopted and raised well by Franciscans, whose life was completely different from other kids his age. He might have experienced playing with other children in the fictional town of Barangay Pag-asa, but what made him stand out was his ability to see and converse with Jesus Christ in the flesh, who he fondly called “Bro”, to heal sick people – a power bestowed to him by his Almighty Friend, and to help others with their problems.

Its story spanned for 38 chapters. There are five specials and one station ID related to the show were released.

Color key:

Main character/Appearances

No appearances

Character
Character	Chapters Other contents																																							
Character	2009																																		2010–2014					
Character	Episodes 1–237																																		Episodes 238–263 Pope John Paul II specials					
Character	1	2	3	4	5	6	7	8	9	10	11	12	13	14	15	16	17	18	19	20	21	22	23	24	25	26	27	28	29	30	31	32	33	34	34	35	36	37	PJPII	38
Character	=== Cast ===																																							
Santino Guillermo	Zaijian Jaranilla	Zaijian Jaranilla	Zaijian Jaranilla	Zaijian Jaranilla	Zaijian Jaranilla	Zaijian Jaranilla	Zaijian Jaranilla	Zaijian Jaranilla	Zaijian Jaranilla	Zaijian Jaranilla	Zaijian Jaranilla	Zaijian Jaranilla	Zaijian Jaranilla	Zaijian Jaranilla	Zaijian Jaranilla	Zaijian Jaranilla	Zaijian Jaranilla	Zaijian Jaranilla	Zaijian Jaranilla	Zaijian Jaranilla	Zaijian Jaranilla	Zaijian Jaranilla	Zaijian Jaranilla	Zaijian Jaranilla	Zaijian Jaranilla	Zaijian Jaranilla	Zaijian Jaranilla	Zaijian Jaranilla	Zaijian Jaranilla	Zaijian Jaranilla	Zaijian Jaranilla	Zaijian Jaranilla	Zaijian Jaranilla	Zaijian Jaranilla	Zaijian Jaranilla	Zaijian Jaranilla	Zaijian Jaranilla	Zaijian Jaranilla	Zaijian Jaranilla	Zaijian Jaranilla
Mayor Enrique D. Rodrigo/ Gonzalvo Policarpio	Albert Martinez	Albert Martinez	Albert Martinez	Albert Martinez	Albert Martinez	Albert Martinez	Albert Martinez	Albert Martinez	Albert Martinez	Albert Martinez	Albert Martinez	Albert Martinez	Albert Martinez	Albert Martinez	Albert Martinez	Albert Martinez	Albert Martinez	Albert Martinez	Albert Martinez	Albert Martinez	Albert Martinez	Albert Martinez	Albert Martinez	Albert Martinez	Albert Martinez	Albert Martinez	Albert Martinez	Albert Martinez	Albert Martinez	Albert Martinez	Albert Martinez	Albert Martinez	Albert Martinez	Albert Martinez	Albert Martinez	Albert Martinez				Albert Martinez
Malena Rodriguez-Rodrigo/Policarpio	Dina Bonnevie	Dina Bonnevie	Dina Bonnevie	Dina Bonnevie	Dina Bonnevie	Dina Bonnevie	Dina Bonnevie	Dina Bonnevie	Dina Bonnevie	Dina Bonnevie	Dina Bonnevie	Dina Bonnevie	Dina Bonnevie	Dina Bonnevie	Dina Bonnevie	Dina Bonnevie	Dina Bonnevie	Dina Bonnevie	Dina Bonnevie	Dina Bonnevie	Dina Bonnevie	Dina Bonnevie	Dina Bonnevie	Dina Bonnevie	Dina Bonnevie	Dina Bonnevie	Dina Bonnevie	Dina Bonnevie	Dina Bonnevie											
Criselda "Sélda" Rodriguez-Sta. Maria	Precious Lara Quigaman	Precious Lara Quigaman	Precious Lara Quigaman	Precious Lara Quigaman	Precious Lara Quigaman	Precious Lara Quigaman	Precious Lara Quigaman	Precious Lara Quigaman	Precious Lara Quigaman	Precious Lara Quigaman	Precious Lara Quigaman	Precious Lara Quigaman	Precious Lara Quigaman	Precious Lara Quigaman	Precious Lara Quigaman	Precious Lara Quigaman	Precious Lara Quigaman	Precious Lara Quigaman	Precious Lara Quigaman	Precious Lara Quigaman	Precious Lara Quigaman	Precious Lara Quigaman	Precious Lara Quigaman	Precious Lara Quigaman	Precious Lara Quigaman	Precious Lara Quigaman	Precious Lara Quigaman	Precious Lara Quigaman	Precious Lara Quigaman	Precious Lara Quigaman	Precious Lara Quigaman	Precious Lara Quigaman	Precious Lara Quigaman	Precious Lara Quigaman	Precious Lara Quigaman	Precious Lara Quigaman	Precious Lara Quigaman	Precious Lara Quigaman		Precious Lara Quigaman
Mario Sta. Maria	Tonton Gutierrez	Tonton Gutierrez	Tonton Gutierrez	Tonton Gutierrez	Tonton Gutierrez	Tonton Gutierrez	Tonton Gutierrez	Tonton Gutierrez	Tonton Gutierrez	Tonton Gutierrez	Tonton Gutierrez	Tonton Gutierrez	Tonton Gutierrez	Tonton Gutierrez	Tonton Gutierrez	Tonton Gutierrez	Tonton Gutierrez	Tonton Gutierrez	Tonton Gutierrez	Tonton Gutierrez	Tonton Gutierrez	Tonton Gutierrez	Tonton Gutierrez	Tonton Gutierrez	Tonton Gutierrez	Tonton Gutierrez	Tonton Gutierrez	Tonton Gutierrez	Tonton Gutierrez	Tonton Gutierrez	Tonton Gutierrez	Tonton Gutierrez	Tonton Gutierrez	Tonton Gutierrez	Tonton Gutierrez	Tonton Gutierrez	Tonton Gutierrez	Tonton Gutierrez		Tonton Gutierrez
Stella R. Sta. Maria	Maja Salvador	Maja Salvador	Maja Salvador	Maja Salvador	Maja Salvador	Maja Salvador	Maja Salvador	Maja Salvador	Maja Salvador	Maja Salvador	Maja Salvador	Maja Salvador	Maja Salvador	Maja Salvador	Maja Salvador	Maja Salvador	Maja Salvador	Maja Salvador	Maja Salvador	Maja Salvador	Maja Salvador	Maja Salvador	Maja Salvador	Maja Salvador	Maja Salvador	Maja Salvador	Maja Salvador	Maja Salvador	Maja Salvador	Maja Salvador	Maja Salvador	Maja Salvador	Maja Salvador	Maja Salvador	Maja Salvador	Maja Salvador	Maja Salvador	Maja Salvador		Maja Salvador
Francisco "Cocoy" Bautista	Rayver Cruz	Rayver Cruz	Rayver Cruz	Rayver Cruz	Rayver Cruz	Rayver Cruz	Rayver Cruz	Rayver Cruz	Rayver Cruz	Rayver Cruz	Rayver Cruz	Rayver Cruz	Rayver Cruz	Rayver Cruz	Rayver Cruz	Rayver Cruz	Rayver Cruz	Rayver Cruz	Rayver Cruz	Rayver Cruz	Rayver Cruz	Rayver Cruz	Rayver Cruz	Rayver Cruz	Rayver Cruz	Rayver Cruz	Rayver Cruz	Rayver Cruz	Rayver Cruz	Rayver Cruz	Rayver Cruz	Rayver Cruz	Rayver Cruz	Rayver Cruz	Rayver Cruz	Rayver Cruz	Rayver Cruz	Rayver Cruz		Rayver Cruz
Clautilde Katerina "Tilde" Magdayo-Rodrigo/Policarpio	Desiree del Valle	Desiree del Valle	Desiree del Valle	Desiree del Valle	Desiree del Valle	Desiree del Valle	Desiree del Valle	Desiree del Valle	Desiree del Valle	Desiree del Valle	Desiree del Valle	Desiree del Valle	Desiree del Valle	Desiree del Valle	Desiree del Valle	Desiree del Valle	Desiree del Valle	Desiree del Valle	Desiree del Valle	Desiree del Valle	Desiree del Valle	Desiree del Valle	Desiree del Valle	Desiree del Valle	Desiree del Valle	Desiree del Valle	Desiree del Valle	Desiree del Valle	Desiree del Valle	Desiree del Valle	Desiree del Valle	Desiree del Valle	Desiree del Valle	Desiree del Valle	Desiree del Valle	Desiree del Valle	Desiree del Valle	Desiree del Valle		Desiree del Valle
Fr. Anthony Ruiz	Jaime Fabregas	Jaime Fabregas	Jaime Fabregas	Jaime Fabregas	Jaime Fabregas	Jaime Fabregas	Jaime Fabregas	Jaime Fabregas	Jaime Fabregas	Jaime Fabregas	Jaime Fabregas	Jaime Fabregas	Jaime Fabregas	Jaime Fabregas	Jaime Fabregas	Jaime Fabregas	Jaime Fabregas	Jaime Fabregas	Jaime Fabregas	Jaime Fabregas	Jaime Fabregas	Jaime Fabregas	Jaime Fabregas	Jaime Fabregas	Jaime Fabregas	Jaime Fabregas	Jaime Fabregas	Jaime Fabregas	Jaime Fabregas	Jaime Fabregas	Jaime Fabregas	Jaime Fabregas	Jaime Fabregas	Jaime Fabregas	Jaime Fabregas	Jaime Fabregas	Jaime Fabregas	Jaime Fabregas	Jaime Fabregas	Jaime Fabregas
Fr. José dela Cruz	Dominic Ochoa	Dominic Ochoa	Dominic Ochoa	Dominic Ochoa	Dominic Ochoa	Dominic Ochoa	Dominic Ochoa	Dominic Ochoa	Dominic Ochoa	Dominic Ochoa	Dominic Ochoa	Dominic Ochoa	Dominic Ochoa	Dominic Ochoa	Dominic Ochoa	Dominic Ochoa	Dominic Ochoa	Dominic Ochoa	Dominic Ochoa	Dominic Ochoa	Dominic Ochoa	Dominic Ochoa	Dominic Ochoa	Dominic Ochoa	Dominic Ochoa	Dominic Ochoa	Dominic Ochoa	Dominic Ochoa	Dominic Ochoa	Dominic Ochoa	Dominic Ochoa	Dominic Ochoa	Dominic Ochoa	Dominic Ochoa	Dominic Ochoa	Dominic Ochoa	Dominic Ochoa	Dominic Ochoa		Dominic Ochoa
Fr. Gregorio "Ringo" Samonte	Lito Pimentel	Lito Pimentel	Lito Pimentel	Lito Pimentel	Lito Pimentel	Lito Pimentel	Lito Pimentel	Lito Pimentel	Lito Pimentel	Lito Pimentel	Lito Pimentel	Lito Pimentel	Lito Pimentel	Lito Pimentel	Lito Pimentel	Lito Pimentel	Lito Pimentel	Lito Pimentel	Lito Pimentel	Lito Pimentel	Lito Pimentel	Lito Pimentel	Lito Pimentel	Lito Pimentel	Lito Pimentel	Lito Pimentel	Lito Pimentel	Lito Pimentel	Lito Pimentel	Lito Pimentel	Lito Pimentel	Lito Pimentel	Lito Pimentel	Lito Pimentel	Lito Pimentel	Lito Pimentel	Lito Pimentel	Lito Pimentel		Lito Pimentel
Fr. Paul Makopa	Badjie Mortiz	Badjie Mortiz	Badjie Mortiz	Badjie Mortiz	Badjie Mortiz	Badjie Mortiz	Badjie Mortiz	Badjie Mortiz	Badjie Mortiz	Badjie Mortiz	Badjie Mortiz	Badjie Mortiz	Badjie Mortiz	Badjie Mortiz	Badjie Mortiz	Badjie Mortiz	Badjie Mortiz	Badjie Mortiz	Badjie Mortiz	Badjie Mortiz	Badjie Mortiz	Badjie Mortiz	Badjie Mortiz	Badjie Mortiz	Badjie Mortiz	Badjie Mortiz	Badjie Mortiz	Badjie Mortiz	Badjie Mortiz	Badjie Mortiz	Badjie Mortiz	Badjie Mortiz	Badjie Mortiz	Badjie Mortiz	Badjie Mortiz	Badjie Mortiz	Badjie Mortiz	Badjie Mortiz		Badjie Mortiz
Fr. George	Andre Tiangco	Andre Tiangco	Andre Tiangco	Andre Tiangco	Andre Tiangco	Andre Tiangco	Andre Tiangco	Andre Tiangco	Andre Tiangco	Andre Tiangco	Andre Tiangco	Andre Tiangco	Andre Tiangco	Andre Tiangco	Andre Tiangco	Andre Tiangco	Andre Tiangco	Andre Tiangco	Andre Tiangco	Andre Tiangco	Andre Tiangco	Andre Tiangco	Andre Tiangco	Andre Tiangco	Andre Tiangco	Andre Tiangco	Andre Tiangco	Andre Tiangco	Andre Tiangco	Andre Tiangco	Andre Tiangco	Andre Tiangco	Andre Tiangco	Andre Tiangco	Andre Tiangco	Andre Tiangco	Andre Tiangco	Andre Tiangco		Andre Tiangco
Fr. Patrick	Ruben Gonzaga	Ruben Gonzaga	Ruben Gonzaga	Ruben Gonzaga	Ruben Gonzaga	Ruben Gonzaga	Ruben Gonzaga	Ruben Gonzaga	Ruben Gonzaga	Ruben Gonzaga	Ruben Gonzaga	Ruben Gonzaga	Ruben Gonzaga	Ruben Gonzaga	Ruben Gonzaga	Ruben Gonzaga	Ruben Gonzaga	Ruben Gonzaga	Ruben Gonzaga	Ruben Gonzaga	Ruben Gonzaga	Ruben Gonzaga	Ruben Gonzaga	Ruben Gonzaga	Ruben Gonzaga	Ruben Gonzaga	Ruben Gonzaga	Ruben Gonzaga	Ruben Gonzaga	Ruben Gonzaga	Ruben Gonzaga	Ruben Gonzaga	Ruben Gonzaga	Ruben Gonzaga	Ruben Gonzaga	Ruben Gonzaga	Ruben Gonzaga	Ruben Gonzaga		Ruben Gonzaga
Fr. Jude	Edgar Sandalo	Edgar Sandalo	Edgar Sandalo	Edgar Sandalo	Edgar Sandalo	Edgar Sandalo	Edgar Sandalo	Edgar Sandalo	Edgar Sandalo	Edgar Sandalo	Edgar Sandalo	Edgar Sandalo	Edgar Sandalo	Edgar Sandalo	Edgar Sandalo	Edgar Sandalo	Edgar Sandalo	Edgar Sandalo	Edgar Sandalo	Edgar Sandalo	Edgar Sandalo	Edgar Sandalo	Edgar Sandalo	Edgar Sandalo	Edgar Sandalo	Edgar Sandalo	Edgar Sandalo	Edgar Sandalo	Edgar Sandalo	Edgar Sandalo	Edgar Sandalo	Edgar Sandalo	Edgar Sandalo	Edgar Sandalo	Edgar Sandalo	Edgar Sandalo	Edgar Sandalo	Edgar Sandalo		Edgar Sandalo
Renato "Atong" Arguelles	Ogie Diaz	Ogie Diaz	Ogie Diaz	Ogie Diaz	Ogie Diaz	Ogie Diaz	Ogie Diaz	Ogie Diaz	Ogie Diaz	Ogie Diaz	Ogie Diaz	Ogie Diaz	Ogie Diaz	Ogie Diaz	Ogie Diaz	Ogie Diaz	Ogie Diaz	Ogie Diaz	Ogie Diaz	Ogie Diaz	Ogie Diaz	Ogie Diaz	Ogie Diaz	Ogie Diaz	Ogie Diaz	Ogie Diaz	Ogie Diaz	Ogie Diaz	Ogie Diaz	Ogie Diaz	Ogie Diaz	Ogie Diaz	Ogie Diaz	Ogie Diaz	Ogie Diaz	Ogie Diaz	Ogie Diaz	Ogie Diaz		Ogie Diaz
Viviana "Baby" Arguelles	Arlene Muhlach	Arlene Muhlach	Arlene Muhlach	Arlene Muhlach	Arlene Muhlach	Arlene Muhlach	Arlene Muhlach	Arlene Muhlach	Arlene Muhlach	Arlene Muhlach	Arlene Muhlach	Arlene Muhlach	Arlene Muhlach	Arlene Muhlach	Arlene Muhlach	Arlene Muhlach	Arlene Muhlach	Arlene Muhlach	Arlene Muhlach	Arlene Muhlach	Arlene Muhlach	Arlene Muhlach	Arlene Muhlach	Arlene Muhlach	Arlene Muhlach	Arlene Muhlach	Arlene Muhlach	Arlene Muhlach	Arlene Muhlach	Arlene Muhlach	Arlene Muhlach	Arlene Muhlach	Arlene Muhlach	Arlene Muhlach	Arlene Muhlach	Arlene Muhlach	Arlene Muhlach	Arlene Muhlach		Arlene Muhlach
Rico R. Rodrigo/Policarpio	Timothy Chan	Timothy Chan	Timothy Chan	Timothy Chan	Timothy Chan	Timothy Chan	Timothy Chan	Timothy Chan	Timothy Chan	Timothy Chan	Timothy Chan	Timothy Chan	Timothy Chan	Timothy Chan	Timothy Chan	Timothy Chan	Timothy Chan	Timothy Chan	Timothy Chan	Timothy Chan	Timothy Chan	Timothy Chan	Timothy Chan	Timothy Chan	Timothy Chan	Timothy Chan	Timothy Chan	Timothy Chan	Timothy Chan	Timothy Chan	Timothy Chan	Timothy Chan	Timothy Chan	Timothy Chan	Timothy Chan	Timothy Chan	Timothy Chan	Timothy Chan		Timothy Chan
Joy R. Sta. Maria	Phoebe Khae Arbotante	Phoebe Khae Arbotante	Phoebe Khae Arbotante	Phoebe Khae Arbotante	Phoebe Khae Arbotante	Phoebe Khae Arbotante	Phoebe Khae Arbotante	Phoebe Khae Arbotante	Phoebe Khae Arbotante	Phoebe Khae Arbotante	Phoebe Khae Arbotante	Phoebe Khae Arbotante	Phoebe Khae Arbotante	Phoebe Khae Arbotante	Phoebe Khae Arbotante	Phoebe Khae Arbotante	Phoebe Khae Arbotante	Phoebe Khae Arbotante	Phoebe Khae Arbotante	Phoebe Khae Arbotante	Phoebe Khae Arbotante	Phoebe Khae Arbotante	Phoebe Khae Arbotante	Phoebe Khae Arbotante	Phoebe Khae Arbotante	Phoebe Khae Arbotante	Phoebe Khae Arbotante	Phoebe Khae Arbotante	Phoebe Khae Arbotante	Phoebe Khae Arbotante	Phoebe Khae Arbotante	Phoebe Khae Arbotante	Phoebe Khae Arbotante	Phoebe Khae Arbotante	Phoebe Khae Arbotante	Phoebe Khae Arbotante	Phoebe Khae Arbotante	Phoebe Khae Arbotante		Phoebe Khae Arbotante
Fr. John Delgado	Victor Basa	Victor Basa	Victor Basa	Victor Basa	Victor Basa	Victor Basa	Victor Basa	Victor Basa	Victor Basa	Victor Basa	Victor Basa	Victor Basa	Victor Basa	Victor Basa	Victor Basa	Victor Basa	Victor Basa	Victor Basa	Victor Basa	Victor Basa	Victor Basa	Victor Basa	Victor Basa	Victor Basa	Victor Basa	Victor Basa	Victor Basa	Victor Basa	Victor Basa	Victor Basa	Victor Basa	Victor Basa	Victor Basa	Victor Basa	Victor Basa	Victor Basa	Victor Basa	Victor Basa		Victor Basa
Paco	Francis Magundayao	Francis Magundayao	Francis Magundayao	Francis Magundayao	Francis Magundayao	Francis Magundayao	Francis Magundayao	Francis Magundayao	Francis Magundayao	Francis Magundayao	Francis Magundayao	Francis Magundayao	Francis Magundayao	Francis Magundayao	Francis Magundayao	Francis Magundayao	Francis Magundayao	Francis Magundayao	Francis Magundayao	Francis Magundayao	Francis Magundayao	Francis Magundayao	Francis Magundayao	Francis Magundayao	Francis Magundayao	Francis Magundayao	Francis Magundayao	Francis Magundayao	Francis Magundayao	Francis Magundayao										
Alfred						Miguelito de Guzman	Miguelito de Guzman	Miguelito de Guzman	Miguelito de Guzman	Miguelito de Guzman	Miguelito de Guzman	Miguelito de Guzman	Miguelito de Guzman	Miguelito de Guzman	Miguelito de Guzman	Miguelito de Guzman	Miguelito de Guzman	Miguelito de Guzman	Miguelito de Guzman	Miguelito de Guzman	Miguelito de Guzman	Miguelito de Guzman	Miguelito de Guzman	Miguelito de Guzman	Miguelito de Guzman	Miguelito de Guzman	Miguelito de Guzman	Miguelito de Guzman	Miguelito de Guzman	Miguelito de Guzman	Miguelito de Guzman	Miguelito de Guzman	Miguelito de Guzman	Miguelito de Guzman	Miguelito de Guzman	Miguelito de Guzman	Miguelito de Guzman	Miguelito de Guzman		Miguelito de Guzman
Doña Anita Rodriguez						Liza Lorena	Liza Lorena	Liza Lorena	Liza Lorena	Liza Lorena	Liza Lorena	Liza Lorena	Liza Lorena	Liza Lorena	Liza Lorena	Liza Lorena	Liza Lorena	Liza Lorena	Liza Lorena	Liza Lorena	Liza Lorena	Liza Lorena	Liza Lorena	Liza Lorena	Liza Lorena	Liza Lorena	Liza Lorena	Liza Lorena	Liza Lorena	Liza Lorena	Liza Lorena	Liza Lorena	Liza Lorena	Liza Lorena	Liza Lorena	Liza Lorena	Liza Lorena	Liza Lorena		Liza Lorena
Dante Maorcio																		Michael Conan	Michael Conan	Michael Conan	Michael Conan	Michael Conan	Michael Conan	Michael Conan	Michael Conan	Michael Conan	Michael Conan	Michael Conan	Michael Conan	Michael Conan	Michael Conan	Michael Conan	Michael Conan	Michael Conan	Michael Conan	Michael Conan	Michael Conan	Michael Conan		Michael Conan
Robert Sanchez/Gustavo Policarpio															Ron Morales	Ron Morales	Ron Morales	Ron Morales	Ron Morales	Ron Morales	Ron Morales	Ron Morales	Ron Morales	Ron Morales	Ron Morales	Ron Morales	Ron Morales	Ron Morales	Ron Morales	Ron Morales	Ron Morales	Ron Morales	Ron Morales	Ron Morales	Ron Morales					
Senior Superintendent (Police Colonel) Raul Guevarra											Jerry; O'Hara	Jerry; O'Hara	Jerry; O'Hara	Jerry; O'Hara	Jerry; O'Hara	Jerry; O'Hara	Jerry; O'Hara	Jerry; O'Hara	Jerry; O'Hara	Jerry; O'Hara	Jerry; O'Hara	Jerry; O'Hara	Jerry; O'Hara	Jerry; O'Hara	Jerry; O'Hara	Jerry; O'Hara	Jerry; O'Hara	Jerry; O'Hara	Jerry; O'Hara	Jerry; O'Hara	Jerry; O'Hara	Jerry; O'Hara	Jerry; O'Hara	Jerry; O'Hara	Jerry; O'Hara	Jerry; O'Hara	Jerry; O'Hara	Jerry; O'Hara		Jerry; O'Hara
Rosalie, Kimberly, and Jennifer	Fictitious versions of themselves	Fictitious versions of themselves	Fictitious versions of themselves	Fictitious versions of themselves	Fictitious versions of themselves	Fictitious versions of themselves	Fictitious versions of themselves	Fictitious versions of themselves	Fictitious versions of themselves	Fictitious versions of themselves	Fictitious versions of themselves	Fictitious versions of themselves	Fictitious versions of themselves	Fictitious versions of themselves	Fictitious versions of themselves	Fictitious versions of themselves	Fictitious versions of themselves	Fictitious versions of themselves	Fictitious versions of themselves	Fictitious versions of themselves	Fictitious versions of themselves	Fictitious versions of themselves	Fictitious versions of themselves	Fictitious versions of themselves	Fictitious versions of themselves	Fictitious versions of themselves	Fictitious versions of themselves	Fictitious versions of themselves	Fictitious versions of themselves	Fictitious versions of themselves	Fictitious versions of themselves	Fictitious versions of themselves	Fictitious versions of themselves	Fictitious versions of themselves	Fictitious versions of themselves	Fictitious versions of themselves	Fictitious versions of themselves	Fictitious versions of themselves		Fictitious versions of themselves
Grace																								Erin Panlilio	Erin Panlilio				Erin Panlilio	Erin Panlilio	Erin Panlilio	Erin Panlilio	Erin Panlilio	Erin Panlilio	Erin Panlilio	Erin Panlilio	Erin Panlilio	Erin Panlilio		Erin Panlilio
Pope John Paul II																																							Himself	

== Cast and characters ==
=== Main cast ===
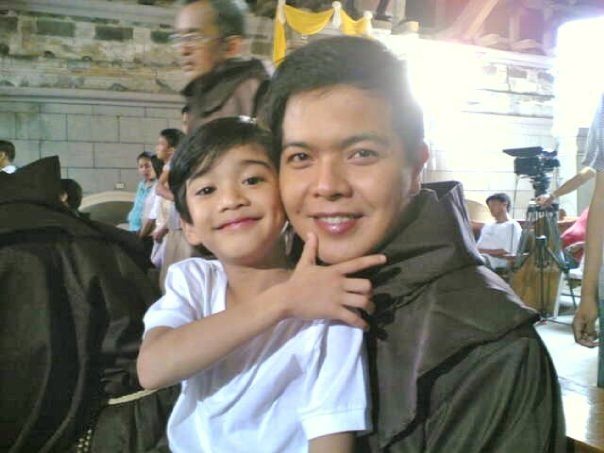
Zaijian Jaranilla (left) portrays Santino. Andre Tiangco (right) portrays Fr. George

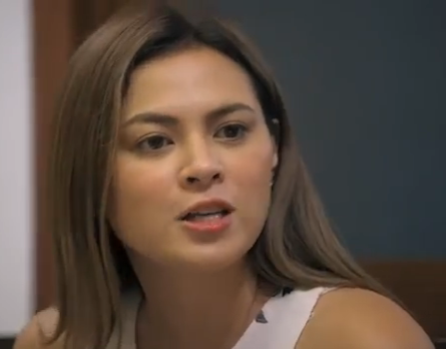
Precious Lara Quigaman portrays Criselda "Selda" Rodriguez-Sta. Maria

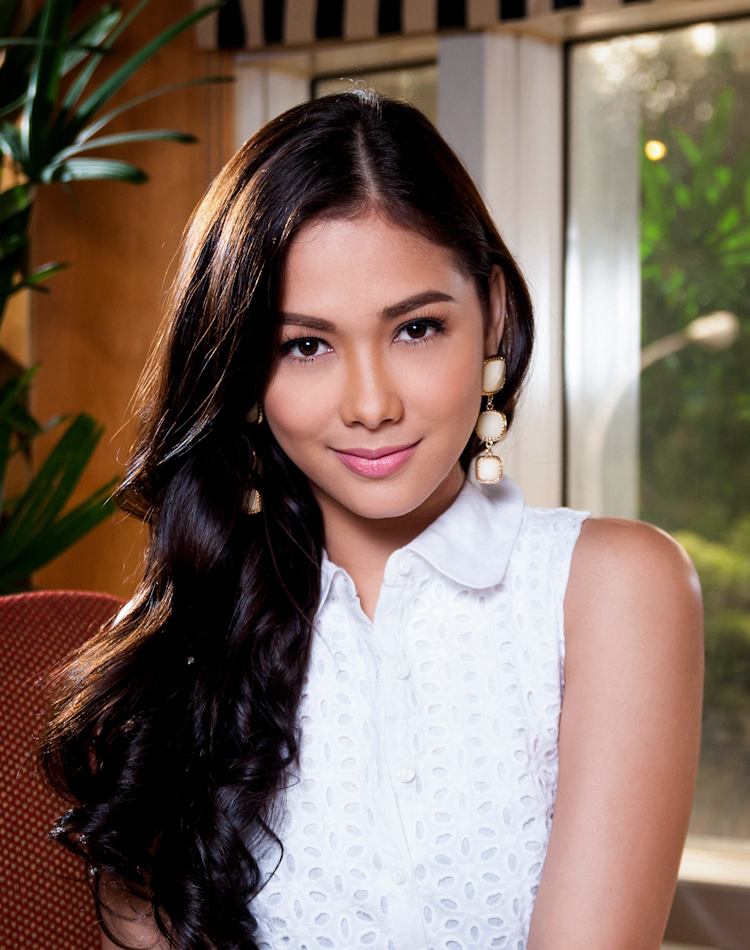
Maja Salvador portrays Stella R. Sta. Maria

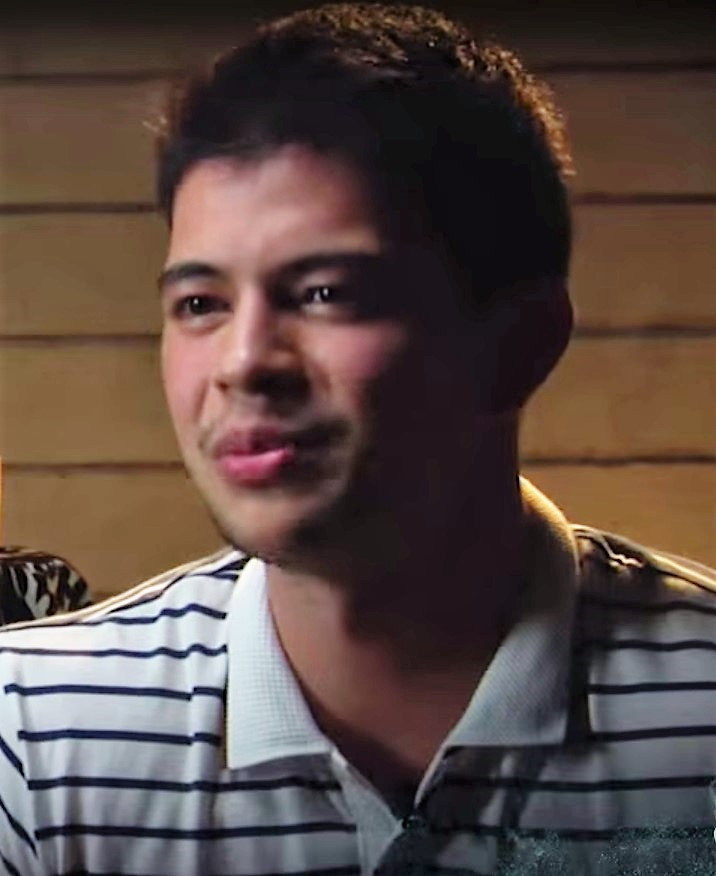
Rayver Cruz portrays Francisco "Cocoy" Bautista

Cast	Character	Summary
Zaijian Jaranilla	Santino Guillermo/Gabriel M. Policarpio/Rodrigo	The show's protagonist, he is a naïve and attentive young boy. Longing for the love of his real mother, he meets with Jesus Christ in the flesh and calls him "Bro". Bro gives him healing powers and assists him as he patches up the lives of the people in their town. He is Enrique and Teresa's biological son.
Albert Martinez and Jairus Aquino	Mayor Enrique D. Rodrigo/Gonzalvo Policarpio and Young Enrique Rodrigo/Gonzalvo Policarpio	The mayor of Bagong Pag-asa. He is a stereotypical Filipino politician whose lust for wealth and power will drive him to do illegal acts. He never treated Stella as his real daughter; it is later revealed that Enrique is not her biological father. He is unaware that he is Santino's biological father and develops a sense of compassion for the boy. Later on in the story he learns he is adopted, the son of the couple who was killed when Doña Anita was taking over the land they lived on. He finally married Tilde. He was killed by his younger brother Robert after saving Santino's life and backing out of the mayoralty race, but not before informing Santino of his parentage. He was revealed to be Santino's father in the afterlife scene.
Dina Bonnevie	Malena Rodriguez-Rodrigo/Policarpio	The wife of Enrique. She will do everything to prove her love for her husband. Coming from a wealthy family, Malena envied her sister Selda's intelligence and love for Mario, since she loved him too. This pushed her to commit wrong deeds. Underneath her beauty and glamor is a dark secret that continues to haunt her, she is the only one who knows Santino's biological mother. It was later revealed in a flashback that she accidentally killed Santino's mother. She is initially mistaken to be Santino's mother. She was the only one who can prove that Santino is indeed Enrique's son with Teresa until it was later revealed that Tilde also knows about Malena's hidden secret. She was involved in an accident along with Rico, Malena is forced to get help from Santino causing her to forget her anger against him and accepted him as a friend. Irony takes its place after she and Tilde come face to face at the place where she accidentally killed Teresa. After a fight, Tilde accidentally pushed and killed Malena similarly to the way Malena killed Teresa.
Precious Lara Quigaman	Criselda "Sélda" Rodriguez-Sta. Maria	The wife of Mario, the mother of Joy, and the younger sister of Malena. She's a policewoman. Santino looks up to her as a mother-figure. Along with her sister Malena, she also came from a rich family but she gave up her lifestyle in order to be with her lover Mario and nearly separated from him after learning that Stella is his real daughter.
Tonton Gutierrez	Mario Sta. Maria	A loyal policeman whose terminally-ill daughter Joy was miraculously healed by Santino. He is Sélda's husband, Malena's ex-lover and Stella's real father. He was dismissed from service for alleged insubordination and absence without leave, but resumed with the help of Santino and the townspeople. He nearly separated from Selda. According to several mentions from his superior, his father was also a loyal policeman who was shamefully dismissed for false charges against him, causing him to die as a broken man. Now, he wants to challenge Enrique by running against him in the upcoming mayoral elections.
Maja Salvador	Stella R. Sta. Maria	The obedient daughter of Enrique and Malena. She treats Santino as her younger brother. It is revealed that her biological father is Mario. She was once the girlfriend of Cocoy. She later leaves her parents for their differences, and moves in with Selda and Mario. Stella went to the US but came back with her grandmother. As she returns to Bagong Pag-asa, her anger towards Cocoy still emerged until she found out the truth and came got back with him. Later in the series, she was kidnapped by prostitute dealers after trying to visit her mother at a beach house. She tried to escape but accidentally lit a fire and caused an explosion. As the Bagong Pag-asa police witnessed, they claimed Stella's dead, 'til it was revealed that she did survive the explosion. Stella hasn't spent a lot of time with her mother returned to Bagong Pag-asa, where the household was currently having Malena's funeral.
Rayver Cruz	Francisco "Cocoy" Bautista	An orphaned young man who works as an assistant at the monastery. He was previously detained several times for petty crimes. He was in a relationship with Stella, but they both broke up when Stella asked to do so, and further distanced away when Stella was sent to the US. After explaining everything to her, they got back together, with Cocoy applying for a scholarship in a college to prove his worth to Stella. He is part of the college's basketball varsity team.
Desiree del Valle	Clautilde Katerina "Tilde" Magdayo-Rodrigo/Policarpio	The mayor's beautiful mistress and his second wife, she is a former prostitute. She helps to execute the mayor's orders in threatening Santino and the monks. It was later revealed that she was pregnant with Enrique's son. It was revealed that Tilde also knows that Malena killed her friend Teresa; she used this to threaten Malena so that the latter would separate with Enrique, which would ultimately result in Tilde finally having Enrique back in her hands. During a fight with Malena, she accidentally killed her after pushing her off a hill. Months after Malena's death, Enrique married Tilde, in the midst of an ongoing crisis in Bagong Pag-Asa. She was arrested after authorities solved the case of Malena's death, but escaped after pretending to go into labor. She kidnapped and accidentally killed Santino in an attempt to have him heal her colon cancer and save her baby.

=== Spiritual characters ===
Cast	Character	Summary
Love Thadani (uncredited)	Jesus Christ	Nicknamed as "Bro", Jesus Christ is Santino's mysterious supernatural friend, who is the supposed source of his healing powers. In scenes where He converses with Santino, His face is hidden and remains so throughout the series. Camera angles used to obscure His face are from behind Him, hair covering the sides of His face (for side shots), a view of His torso part with the head offscreen, Santino from His perspective and other forms. In the "afterlife" scenes in the finale, sunlight obscures His face when cameras are focused on Him and before the end of the afterlife scenes, He is seen in silhouette.
Uncredited voice actor	Satan	Unlike Bro who physically appears, Satan is only depicted as a reddish white light and speaks with a sinister, bone-chilling voice. He pretended to be Jesus and gave Rico psychic powers in order to prophesied misfortunes in Bagong Pag-Asa and he influenced Santino to leave Bagong Pag-asa, allowing Rico to do evil in that town.
Charo Santos-Concio	Mother Mary	A mysterious, kindly looking old woman who appears in the afterlife. Introduced by "Bro" as his Mother.

=== The Priests ===
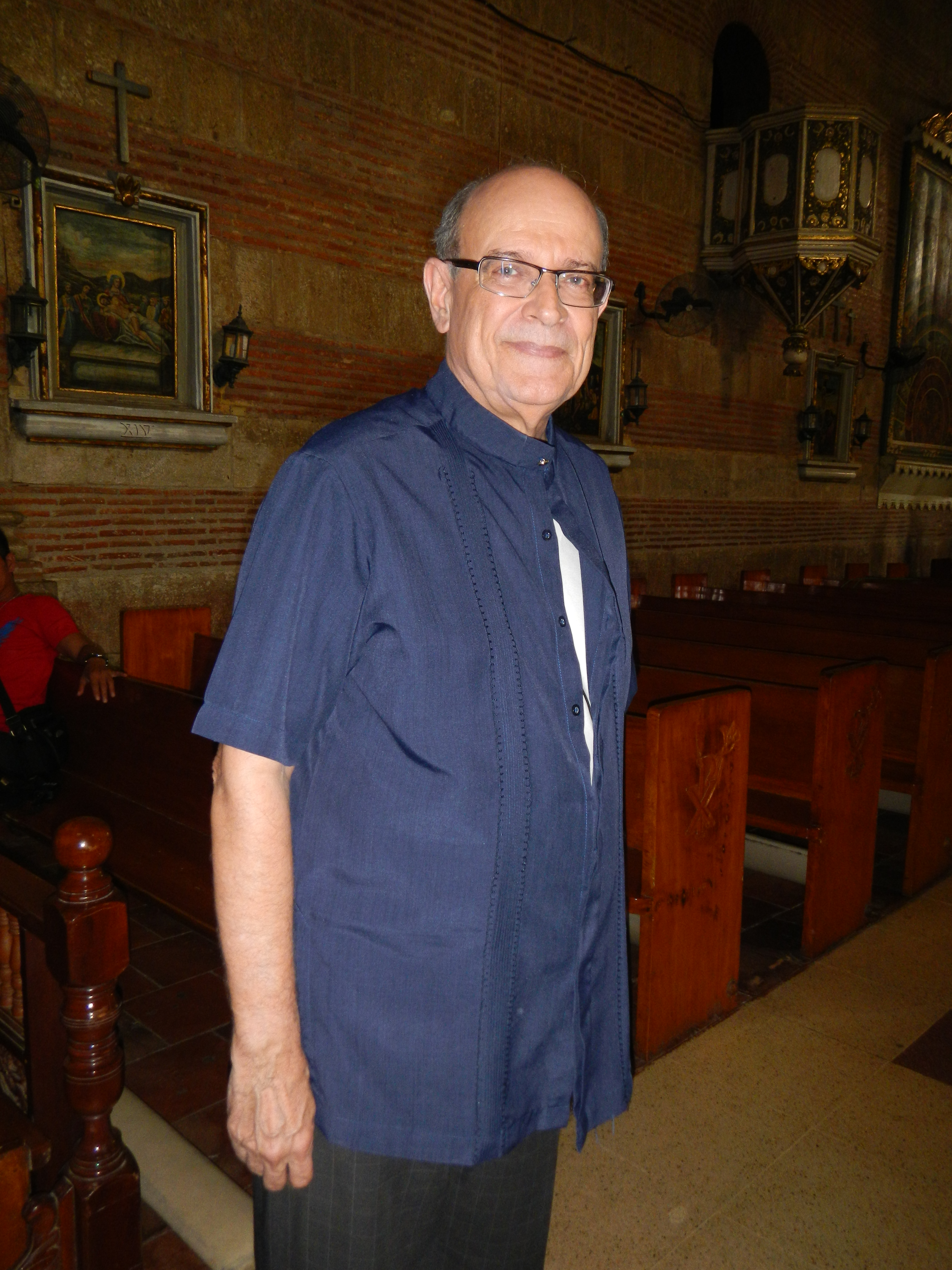
Jaime Fabregas portrays Fr. Anthony

Cast	Character	Summary
Jaime Fabregas	Fr. Anthony Ruiz	The rigid chief administrator of the monastery. Underneath his strict demeanor is his love and concern for Santino. An assassin sent by Robert killed Father Anthony and Santino tried to resurrect him but was too late. Santino then had a vision of Christ saying that he will rise again and Fr. Anthony woke up after the vision.
Dominic Ochoa	Fr. Jose Guillermo	Serving as the chef in the monastery, Santino considers him to be a father-figure. Father Jose formerly worked as a chef (where he later resigned) in a mansion, where Enrique and his brother are hiding their gambling place. Enrique revealed that Fr. José had a wife and a child who were killed in a car accident years back, and he was blamed for their deaths. Later in the series, after being ashamed in breaking the seal of confession to save Santino, he quits the priesthood. However, this gave him an opportunity to legally adopt Santino.
Lito Pimentel and Rodjun Cruz	Fr. Gregorio "Ringo" Samonte and young Gregorio "Ringo" Samonte	The monastery's bell-ringer which earned him his name. Fr. Ringo lived a life of partying and music prior to his priesthood. His true past was revealed when Enrique was uncovering the dirty secrets of the monastery's priests. Fr. Ringo was an ex-convict for theft, and his calling to religious life came when he served as a sacristan during his prison stint. He was brought to the monastery by Fr. Anthony to start a new life.
Badjie Mortiz	Fr. Paul Makopa	The monastery's gatekeeper. He was also shot by Tatay Ben's men, but was healed by Santino.
David Chua	Fr. Chino "Chi" Wang	The treasurer of the monastery; whose Chinese-Filipino and was supposed to become a businessman, but eventually chose the priesthood. His sister has sought comfort from him after running away from an arranged marriage with a man she did not love.
Andre Tiangco†	Fr. George	Father "Linis" (Clean), this obsessive-compulsive priest is always seen with a towel draped on one shoulder, and carrying brooms and mops. He leads the priests in keeping the monastery clean. He is also in charge of the monastery's first aid kit.
Ruben Gonzaga	Fr. Patrick	Takes care of the monastery's little farm and garden. His family engages in fishing; he discovered in a visit to his family that his younger brother, Jepoy, was involved in dynamite fishing.
Edgar Sandalo†	Fr. Jude	One of the 12 priests in the monastery, Father Jude is characterized as a grumpy man with a white mustache, beard and hair.
Victor Basa	Fr. John Delgado	The son of a wealthy haciendero and businessman, his father had a lot of dreams for him, but he entered the religious life, estranging him from his father. Later, John and his father reconciled, the latter accepting John's choice.
	Fr. Miguel	One of the older Priests that accompanies Fr. Anthony. He gives Santino his share of food whenever Santino gives his food to one of his friends. Saying he wants Santino to eat a proper meal because he loves the boy.
	Fr. Thomas	One of the older Priests that accompanies Fr. Anthony. Fr. Thomas is often seen walking alongside Fr. Miguel and Fr. Jude and he is also seen working at the Garden with Fr. Patrick. In the course of the series, Fr. Thomas is relocated to Sta. Philomena in recommendation to Fr. Anthony on another position at a parish. He stayed until the Music Festival.
	Fr. Chris	One of the younger Priests in the Monastery. Fr. Chris is in charge of the carpentry and crafts being done in the monastery. He checks the doors and windows for repairs in the monastery and at the church. He was also a foreman and volunteered to help in repairing the broken road in front of the Church, and he made all the decorative Parols outside the church for Santino after he was saved from being kidnapped.

=== Supporting cast ===
Cast	Character	Summary
Ogie Diaz	Renato "Atong" Arguelles	The flamboyantly gay husband of Baby who owns a store business.
Arlene Muhlach	Viviana "Baby" Arguelles	The "Queen Of Gossips", and Malena's best friend. When Baby discovered that Malena's earrings are the same with Santino's, she suspected Malena as being Santino's mother.
Timothy Chan	Rico R. Rodrigo/Policarpio	Enrique and Malena's son and half-brother to Stella. He started befriending Santino after seeing the boy's good nature. Rico is not privy to the secret of Santino being his paternal half-brother. After Enrique died, Rico was discovered to possess the power of foresight (mostly tragic events, including Santino's death). This must be the series' antagonist and later in the end, he reconciles Santino.
Phoebe Khae Arbotante	Joy R. Sta. Maria	Mario and Selda's daughter, and Stella's half-sister/cousin. When she was terminally ill, she was saved by Santino. As one of Santino's closest friends, she became a member of Santino's Angels.

=== Additional cast ===
Cast	Character	Summary
Francis Magundayao	Paco	One of Santino's closest friends. He used to beg with his grandmother but she got into an accident and was healed by Santino. He promised to God that he will never do those things again. He also became one of the scholars of the monastery and as Santino's friend became a member of Santino's Angels.
Miguelito de Guzman	Alfred	He became friends with Santino after running away from home after his parents are about to get a divorce. He's also a member of Santino's Angels.
Liza Lorena	Doña Anita Rodriguez	Malena and Selda's mother. After living in the US for several years, she returns to the Philippines to pay a visit to the family together with Stella and Robert, her personal assistant. Doña Anita was imprisoned after being formally charged and being proclaimed guilty after being accused for the murder that happened to Bagong Pag-asa 30 years ago. On the day of Malena's burial, she was acquitted on all charges due to lack of evidence.
Michael Conan	Dante Maoricio	A new Police Officer assigned to Bagong Pag-asa.
Ron Morales	Robert Sanchez/ Gustavo Policarpio	Doña Anita's personal assistant who practically takes care of all the files Doña Anita has. He has worked for Doña Anita since she lived in the US, he also took care of Doña Anita's case. It is later revealed that he is the younger brother of Mayor Enrique Rodrigo and also he's a biological uncle of Santino & Rico. He shot Enrique.
Jerry O'Hara	Senior Superintendent (Police Colonel) Raul Guevarra	the Chief of Police in Bagong Pag-asa.
Rosalie, Kimberly, and Jennifer	Fictitious versions of themselves	Atrio of idle ladies who are described as gossipers. The additional comic relief of the show, the three always rush into the Arguelles' store to gossip, only to end up being hilariously dismissed by Atong, who accompanies their expulsion with shouts of "Layas!" ("go away" or "get lost"). If they fail to obey Atong's orders, the latter would brandish a kitchen knife to threaten them with death.
Erin Panlilio	Grace	Moy & Jackie's daughter. Grace didn't want to live with her mom because she knows for the fact that Jackie had abandoned them due to her father's lack of money. As part of her wishes, she only wants to be with her father, her grandfather Pilo and their dog, Rocky. Now, she's going to the same school with Santino and his friends (Rico, Joy, Alfred and Paco).
