= List of May Bukas Pa episodes and chapters =

May Bukas Pa (transl. There's Still Tomorrow) is a Philippine religious-themed television series, inspired by the 1955 Spanish film Marcelino pan y vino and 1981 anime Superbook. Directed by Jerome Chavez Pobocan, Jojo A. Saguin, and Erick C. Salud, it is topbilled by Zaijian Jaranilla together with an ensemble cast. It is a revival of the 2000–2001 series of the same name produced by Viva Television (now Studio Viva). Guest casts and addition of characters to the show are shown on each chapter.

The original broadcast cut version of the series aired on ABS-CBN's Primetime Bida evening block from February 2, 2009 to February 5, 2010, replacing Precious Time. After a two-year hiatus, an extended clean feed version of the show with a deleted scene of its finale episode 263 was released from July 2012 to December 5, 2013 where some episodes on TFC website replaced the former and continued through airing on its sister channel Jeepney TV from March 11, 2013. Four specials and one station ID in reference to the series were aired.

== Overview ==
Decade and year	Chapter numbers (with episode numbers)	No. of chapters	No. of episodes	No. of episodes (overall)	No. of other contents (show-related station ID and specials)	First aired (by chapter)	Last aired (by chapter)	First aired (overall)	Last aired (overall)
2000s (2009)	1–12 (1–65)	34	65	237	4	February 2, 2009	May 5, 2009	February 2, 2009	December 31, 2009
2000s (2009)	12–22 (66–121)	34	56	237	4	May 6, 2009	July 22, 2009	February 2, 2009	December 31, 2009
2000s (2009)	22–27 (122–155)	34	34	237	4	July 23, 2009	September 8, 2009	February 2, 2009	December 31, 2009
2000s (2009)	28 (156–160)	34	5	237	4	September 9, 2009	September 15, 2009	February 2, 2009	December 31, 2009
2000s (2009)	28 (161–179)	34	19	237	4	September 16, 2009	October 12, 2009	February 2, 2009	December 31, 2009
2000s (2009)	29 (180–195)	34	16	237	4	October 13, 2009	November 3, 2009	February 2, 2009	December 31, 2009
2000s (2009)	29–30 (196–218)	34	23	237	4	November 4, 2009	December 4, 2009	February 2, 2009	December 31, 2009
2000s (2009)	31–34 (219–237)	34	19	237	4	December 7, 2009	December 31, 2009	February 2, 2009	December 31, 2009
2010s (2010–2013)	34 (238–240)	5	6	26	2	January 1, 2010	January 5, 2010	January 1, 2010	December 5, 2013
2010s (2010–2013)	34 (241–243)	5	7	26	2	January 6, 2010	January 8, 2010	January 1, 2010	December 5, 2013
2010s (2010–2013)	35 (244–247)	5	4	26	2	January 11, 2010	January 14, 2010	January 1, 2010	December 5, 2013
2010s (2010–2013)	35–36 (248–251)	5	7	26	2	January 15, 2010	January 20, 2010	January 1, 2010	December 5, 2013
2010s (2010–2013)	36–37 (252–254)	5	6	26	2	January 21, 2010	January 25, 2010	January 1, 2010	December 5, 2013
2010s (2010–2013)	37 (255–258), and Extended and Clean Feed Version (1–258)	5	5	26	2	January 26, 2010	December 4, 2013	January 1, 2010	December 5, 2013
2010s (2010–2013)	37–38 (259–263), Extended Last 5 Episodes, and Specials	5	5	26	2	February 1, 2010	December 5, 2013	January 1, 2010	December 5, 2013

== Synopsis ==
The story revolves around Santino (Zaijian Jaranilla), a wide-eyed young boy who was orphaned as a baby before being adopted and raised by Franciscans. Living in the fictional town of Barangay Bagong Pag-asa, he eventually discovers the ability to see and speak with Jesus Christ, whom he fondly called “Bro”. He also gains the ability to miraculously heal the sick. With these special abilities, Santino goes out to help other people with their problems and make a difference in their lives.

== Episodes ==
=== 2000s (2009) ===
==== Chapters 1–12 (Episodes 1–65) ====
The first 65 episodes of the series were re-aired during its two reruns, with the first 48 episodes of the series from April 9 to 11, 2009 during the Holy Triduum of that year, and the second being the first 65 (coinciding with the anniversary number that ABS-CBN celebrated from 2018 to 2019, with a video about Jaranilla returning to the church where the series was set made in June 2019) from March 16 to May 4, 2020 due to the network's shut down on May 5, 2020 as a result of the expiration of its broadcast franchise granted in 1995 the day prior, temporarily replacing FPJ's Ang Probinsyano because of the community quarantines caused by the COVID-19 pandemic in the Philippines which ABS-CBN temporarily suspended the tapings of their ongoing dramas.

Chapter number	Chapter name	Summary
1	Mystery	Found abandoned as an infant in a cemetery, Santino is adopted by a group of priests in a small town, who all pitch in to raise him as a little boy. Santino grows up happily in the church living with the priests, who raise him as their own.: Chin-Chin Gutierrez as Narrator (pilot episode)/Teresa Malimban† – Santino's biological mother and Enrique's former mistress before Malena. Accidentally killed by Malena. Father Anthony does not believe that she is Santino's true mother because the earring found with the infant Santino did not match Teresa's own pair.; Cris Daluz† as Emong – cemetery groundskeeper.; Tony Mabesa as Mayor Pio A. Ruiz† – former mayor of Bagong Pag-asa; Liza Lorena as Doña Anita Rodriguez – Malena and Selda's Mother.; Francis Magundayao as Paco – He used to beg with his grandmother.; Eva Darren as Lola Belen – Paco's grandmother.
2	Remorse	Santino was kidnapped by an unknown man in the middle of the night. It was later revealed that this man is Olegario Pineda, a criminal who Mario have imprisoned years ago. Mario suspects that Olegario kidnapped Santino to take revenge, however, this is not the real reason. As the two journeys to an unknown location, Olegario tells Santino that he needs him to heal his son who has a brain tumor allowing his son to only have a shorter life. Olegario and Santino successfully made it to town of Sta. Maria where Santino could finally heal Olegario's son. In these events, Olegario was taken over by the police as they arrive, he was numerously shot by another policeman even though Santino begs that he is a good person. Later, Santino grants his promise to Olegario that he would heal his son.: John Estrada as Olegario "Oleg" Pineda† – a prison escapee who kidnaps Santino in hopes for a miracle to heal his seriously illed son. He later befriends with Santino in their way to Olegario's home. He then later surrenders himself to the police, but is killed.; Kimberly Diaz as Olegario's wife. She went to Santino in wish to heal their son, however, the court has forbidden Santino to heal people, due to the suspicion of this being a scam.
3	Forgiveness	Meanwhile, after being held in an orphanage, Santino runs away after learning that a couple would want to take him just to make money on his healing abilities. As Santino runs away, he meets Lolo Berting, a puto vendor who helped him find his way home. As Santino lives with Lolo Berting, Santino slowly learns that Berting has mysteries of his own. His son, Jojo, has despised him for leaving him and his mother alone till his mother dies. Santino then makes Berting's son to realize that he has to forgive his father because everyone also needs to be forgiven.: Robert Arevalo as Berting – a puto vendor who helped Santino when he was lost after running away from the shelter. His son has forbidden him from his life as it caused his mother to die. He comes around his son's house secretly and gives puto to his granddaughter, Bea.; Richard Quan as Jojo – Berting's son, who has forgiven his father after Santino makes him realize that other people also needs to be forgiven. He also knows martial arts as he thought that after his father left him, he should learn how to protect himself. He helped Santino from being taken by Mayor's allies.; Xyriel Anne Manabat as Bea – Jojo's daughter and Berting's granddaughter.; Steven Christian Fermo as Young Jojo; Jeffrey Hidalgo as Young Berting; Jan Marini Alano as Fely Aragon – Berting's wife; Tess Antonio – one of the social workers who came to the monastery to take custody of Santino.
4	Memories	Julia suffers due to her mom's recent memory losses, causing her whole career, life and lovelife to be ruined. She feels depressed and tired about problems comes to her way. Her life then changes after meeting Santino.: Claudine Barretto as Julia – a woman who carries bitterness in her heart. Her life will change after she meets miracle boy Santino.; Boots Anson-Roa as Esmeralda – Julia's mother, an old woman suffering from Alzheimer's disease, causing her to quickly forget memories and sometimes being too childish as what most old people become.; Ryan Ramos as Winston – Julia's ex-boyfriend, he broke up with her because of her concentration on taking care of her mother.
5	History	Mayor spills all the malodorous secrets of the priest in the monastery revealing that Father Ringo was an ex-convict and Father Jose's family are all dead.: Rodjun Cruz as young Ringo – As a teenager, Ringo was imprisoned for robbing a shop so that he can get money to help cure his ailing mother.
6	Marriage	Alfred, one of the students in the Bagong Pag-Asa school, has a family problem because his parents are about to separate. As so Alfred moves to the monastery, causing his parents have a hard time looking for him. Thus, Santino helped the couple overcome their problem.: Kaye Abad as Minerva – Alfred's mother and Peter's wife. She and her husband have been having problems due to family crisis and have been planning to separate, causing their child to run away from home.; Joross Gamboa as Peter – Alfred's father and Minerva's husband. He and his wife have been having problems due to family crisis and have been planning to separate, causing their child to run away from home.; Miguelito de Guzman as Alfred – Peter and Minerva's son. He ran away from after discovering that his parents would separate. He ended up in the monastery where he met Santino.
7	Magic	Santino visits the circus and meets a magician named Ricardo. Ricardo and Santino later became friends revealing that Ricardo has a broken family he longs to see but due to some issues, meeting them is not easy.: Gabby Concepcion as Ricardo – a magician that Santino met in the circus. Santino later finds out that he is just a lonely man looking for the comforts of his broken family.; Jobelle Salvador as Kate – the wife of Ricardo who separated with him due to family crisis; Jacob Rica as Michael – Ricardo and Kate's 2nd child; Alexa Ilacad as Michelle† – daughter of Ricardo and Kate who died because of Leukemia; Archie Alemania as Tipoy – Ricardo's friend works on with him on a circus
8	Wealth	Santino and the priests visited Father John's hacienda, where they have met the latter's father, Don Miguel. However, Don Miguel does not welcome his son's priesthood and thinks that John's plans are just silliness. He believes that his son becoming a priest is not the way to happiness. He only believes that the only thing that will let his son gain happiness in life is money.: Dante Rivero as Don Miguel Delgado† – father of Brother John. He initially refused Brother John's plan of being a priest because he believed that being rich and wealthy is the best way to get happiness, but soon realizes after having a talk to Santino that it is not.; Nanding Josef as Manding – helper of Don Miguel whom Father John is more closer to, which caused Don Miguel to feel jealous because John treats Manding more as a father.; Peewee O'hara – as Manding's wife.
9	Search	Santino meets a runaway woman named Cheska. She later reveals to Santino that she was searching for her biological mother who from what she knows still lives in Bagong Pag-asa. Her mother was later revealed to be the owner of the strip club of the town, "Heaven's Gate", but is not excited to meet her daughter.: Cristine Reyes as Cheska – a runaway young woman who searches for real self. After finding out that she was an adopted child, she searched to find her whole life to meet her biological mother; Lotlot De Leon as Natty – Cheska's adoptive mother. A woman who never gets a chance to get pregnant. She bought Cheska from Ella just after they saved her from committing suicide. Nattie and her husband took care of Ella while she is pregnant and bought the kid after it was born.

Chapter number	Chapter name	Summary
9	Search	Santino meets a runaway woman named Cheska. She later reveals to Santino that she was searching for her biological mother who from what she knows still lives in Bagong Pag-asa. Her mother was later revealed to be the owner of the strip club of the town, "Heaven's Gate", but is not excited to meet her daughter.: Cristine Reyes as Cheska – a runaway young woman who searches for real self. After finding out that she was an adopted child, she searched to find her whole life to meet her biological mother; Lotlot De Leon as Natty – Cheska's adoptive mother. A woman who never gets a chance to get pregnant. She bought Cheska from Ella just after they saved her from committing suicide. Nattie and her husband took care of Ella while she is pregnant and bought the kid after it was born.; John Arcilla as Edwardo – Nattie's husband and Cheska's adoptive father. He, together with his wife, Nattie, saved Ella from committing suicide. The couple have been trying so hard to have a baby and got the idea of buying the baby from Ella.; Glenda Garcia as Margie/Ellen – Cheska's biological mother. She is the lead "prostitute" in Heaven's Gate at her young age, but after she got pregnant all of her riches have disappeared. After giving up with life, she decided to commit suicide by jumping off a bridge while pregnant. Natty and her husband then saved her from killing herself. They took care for her, and eventually Ellen sold her baby to them.; Andrea del Rosario as Janet – A woman who searched for her best friend in the town of Bagong Pag-asa. It was later revealed that her friend was Teresa Malimban, a woman connected to the lives of people of Bagong Pag-asa. She found out that her friend was dead more than 5 years ago and later decided to search for Teresa's son Gabriel (who is Santino).
10	Values	A lone teacher suffers through pain after discovering that her whole life of teaching children will later be ended due to her age. She feels alone and sad as she remembers all of her students, sacrificed her whole life for them and eventually became their second mother, yet, none of them seems to remember her works for them.: Susan Roces† as Ms. Nieves Antazo – A teacher in Bagong Pag-Asa Elementary school, who is being forced to retire because of some budget issues. She begs for the school to stay because she does not care about the money, all she cares about are her students. She has spent her lifetime taking care of her students, which caused of her losing most of her loved ones in life.; Roxanne Guinoo as young Ms. Nieves Antazo – as a young woman, Nieves has sacrificed her whole life for her students. Her life and lovelife has been destroyed due to her career.; Toby Alejar as Ms. Nieves Antazo's father; Mikan Ong as Butsoy – Ms. Antazo's ex-student/pupil in her class.; Zeppi Borommeo as Chris – Ms. Antazo's ex-student/pupil in her class.; Jacq Yu as Eliza – Ms. Antazo's ex-student/pupil in her class.; Chinggoy Alonzo as Mr. Manolo Sandoval – The school's principal. He was the one who told Ms. Antazo that she needs to retire from her work in the school.
11	Fame	Adela, a former bold star and G.R.O is abusing her son out of her hate and anger towards him. Adela was lucky to be given a starring role in a movie which ended due to her pregnancy for her son. Boy George, her son, suffers to a lot of assault his mother gives because of his below-average IQ, which is not enough for him to even enter a good college.: Rosanna Roces as Adela San Jose – Mario's half-sister and is a former pornography actress. After given a serious dramatic role for a movie, she got pregnant causing her whole career to shut down.; Ejay Falcon as Boy George – Adela's son, a battered teenager due to his mother's greed of him causing her whole career to be ruined. Also, he is Mario's nephew. Boy George returns Bagong Pag-asa to pay a visit. At the same time he met Abby and fell in love with her. Now, Boy George is having troubles on how to court Abby. He returns to Bagong Pag-Asa and later learns that Mario was sacked from the police force.; Janna Dominguez as young Adela San Jose – as a young woman, Adela stars on dramatic pornographic movies.; John James Uy; Jerry O'Hara as Senior Superintendent Raul Guevarra – the Chief of Police in Bagong Pag-asa. Seems to have known (and possibly have worked with) Mario's father, also witnessing his downfall.
12	Truth	Carla, the daughter of the Bagong Pag-Asa school principal, is born into a rich and well-educated family. She is the "good and obedient" daughter. She is obedient to her father. She does well in school receiving high grades and is on her way to a good career path or so it seems. Her sister, Judith, is the complete opposite. She is the rebellious daughter. However, Carla gets pregnant causing her dad to turn the wheel and treat her as a disgrace to the family.: Anne Curtis as Carla – a simple, good daughter who later discovered that she is pregnant.; Wendy Valdez as Judith – a rebel daughter who seems to be very emotional. She has been sent to rehab after being caught taking drugs, which she says she only did once. This makes his father become ashamed of her.; Evangeline Pascual as Myrna – mother of Carla and Juliet and wife to Manolo.; Returning characters: Chinggoy Alonzo as Mr. Manolo Sandoval – Carla's father. He likes Carla more than Judith. But then after finding out about Carla's pregnancy, he turned the wheels making Carla a disgrace.

{

No.	Title	Original release date
May Bukas Pa: Holy Week Special and 2020 Rerun (1–48)
Week 1 (1–5)
1	"The Birth of Santino"	February 2, 2009
2	"Santino Meets A New Friend"	February 3, 2009
3	"As Joy's Condition Worsens, Santino Turns to Bro to Help Her"	February 4, 2009
4	"With the Help of Bro, Santino Performs a Miracle of Healing"	February 5, 2009
5	"Mayor Enrique's Desire for Power Will Force Him to Order a Robbery Inside the Church"	February 6, 2009
Week 2 (6–10)
6	"Enrique Orders the Police to Arrest Cocoy"	February 9, 2009
7	"Word Starts to Spread Around Town That Santino Can Miraculously Heal Sick People"	February 10, 2009
8	"Santino Saves Fr. Patrick's Life"	February 11, 2009
9	"Malena Tries to Steal Santino's Necklace"	February 12, 2009
10	"Santino Loses His Necklace Which Is The Only Remembrance from His Mother"	February 13, 2009
Week 3 (11–15)
11	"Santino Becomes the Miracle Boy"	February 16, 2009
12	"Mayor Enrique Prepares Something Against Santino and the Priests"	February 17, 2009
13	"Social Welfare Comes to Take Santino Away from the Monastery"	February 18, 2009
14	"Mayor's Son Sets Up Santino"	February 19, 2009
15	"Enrique Finally Gets to Destroy Little Santino"	February 20, 2009
Week 4 (16–20)
16	"A Prison Runaway Kidnaps Santino"	February 23, 2009
17	"Santino Keeps a Promise for a Short-Lived Friendship"	February 24, 2009
18	"New Problems Arise as Santino Returns to the Monastery"	February 25, 2009
19	"Is It Really Goodbye Between Santino and the Priests?"	February 26, 2009
20	"Santino Is Taken from the Monastery"	February 27, 2009
Week 5 (21–25)
21	"Enrique Wants to See Father Anthony Behind Bars"	March 2, 2009
22	"Santino Runs Away from the Shelter"	March 3, 2009
23	"Mayor's Hired Men are After Santino"	March 4, 2009
24	"An Innocent Life Will Be in Danger in Order to Save Little Santino"	March 5, 2009
25	"Santino Returns in Friar's Custody"	March 6, 2009
Week 6 (26–30)
26	"Santino Meets Julia"	March 9, 2009
27	"Stella Finds Something in Her Mom's Possession"	March 10, 2009
28	"Stella Confronted Her Mother about the Earring"	March 11, 2009
29	"The People of Bagong Pag-asa Protested Against Mayor"	March 12, 2009
30	"Enrique Shames Father Ringo"	March 13, 2009
Week 7 (31–35)
31	"Enrique Exposes the Past Crime of Father Ringo"	March 16, 2009
32	"The Townspeople Protest Against the Priests"	March 17, 2009
33	"Everyone Wonders How Santino Softened Mayor's Heart"	March 18, 2009
34	"Malena Asks Cocoy to Stay Away from Stella"	March 19, 2009
35	"Santino Promises Alfred to Help His Parents Get Back Together"	March 20, 2009
Week 8 (36–40)
36	"Malena Suspects Enrique of Having a Mistress"	March 23, 2009
37	"Enrique Asks the Priests and Santino's Forgiveness"	March 24, 2009
38	"Ricky Looks Back to His Past"	March 25, 2009
39	"Malena Gets into a Car Accident"	March 26, 2009
40	"Santino Tries to Heal Malena from Sickness"	March 27, 2009
Week 9 (41–45)
41	"Santino Helps Ricardo Reconcile with His Family"	March 30, 2009
42	"Malena Is Desperate to Be Able to Walk Again"	March 31, 2009
43	"Mayor Uses Santino for Political Advantages"	April 1, 2009
44	"Brother John Tries to Convince His Father to Accept His Decision of Becoming a Priest"	April 2, 2009
45	"Brother John and His Father Finally Reconcile"	April 3, 2009
Week 10 (46–50)
46	"Don Miguel Donates a Large Amount of Money to the Monastery"	April 6, 2009
47	"The Ordination of Brother John"	April 7, 2009
48	"Chesca Begins Looking for Her Mother from an Indecent Place"	April 8, 2009
May Bukas Pa: 2020 Rerun (49–65)
49	"Chesca's Devastated Upon Knowing Her Real Mother"	April 13, 2009
50	"Margie Confesses to Santino That She Truly Loves Her Daughter, Chesca"	April 14, 2009
Week 11 (51–55)
51	"Cocoy and Stella Plan to Elope"	April 15, 2009
52	"Cocoy Is Released from Prison"	April 16, 2009
53	"Ms. Antazo Regrets Putting All Her Life Into Teaching"	April 17, 2009
54	"Enrique Exploits the Golden Sto. Niño"	April 20, 2009
55	"Tilde Gets An Unexpected Visitor"	April 21, 2009
Week 12 (56–60)
56	"Janet Finally Finds Teresa"	April 22, 2009
57	"Janet Meets Santino"	April 23, 2009
58	"Mario's Nephew Pays Him A Visit"	April 24, 2009
59	"Boy George Runs Away"	April 27, 2009
60	"Santino Extends His Hand to Adela"	April 28, 2009
Week 13 (61–65)
61	"Adela and Boy George Reconcile"	April 29, 2009
62	"Malena Outsmarts Enrique"	April 30, 2009
63	"Enrique Tries to Get Back at Malena"	May 1, 2009
64	"Enrique's Men Lose His Money"	May 4, 2009
65	"Carla's Little Secret Is Revealed"	May 5, 2009

==== Chapters 12–22 (Episodes 66–121) ====
Chapter number	Chapter name	Summary
12	Truth	Carla, the daughter of the Bagong Pag-Asa school principal, is born into a rich and well-educated family. She is the "good and obedient" daughter. She is obedient to her father. She does well in school receiving high grades and is on her way to a good career path or so it seems. Her sister, Judith, is the complete opposite. She is the rebellious daughter. However, Carla gets pregnant causing her dad to turn the wheel and treat her as a disgrace to the family.: Anne Curtis as Carla – a simple, good daughter who later discovered that she is pregnant.; Wendy Valdez as Judith – a rebel daughter who seems to be very emotional. She has been sent to rehab after being caught taking drugs, which she says she only did once. This makes his father become ashamed of her.; Evangeline Pascual as Myrna – mother of Carla and Juliet and wife to Manolo.; Returning characters: Chinggoy Alonzo as Mr. Manolo Sandoval – Carla's father. He likes Carla more than Judith. But then after finding out about Carla's pregnancy, he turned the wheels making Carla a disgrace.
13	Love	A woman and a man mysteriously appears in Bagong Pag-Asa and started searching for their son. Santino, as he knows that his real mother is probably alive have been mistakenly thought as the son of Miriam.: Lorna Tolentino as Miriam – A woman who searches for her long-lost son named Ogie in Bagong Pag-asa who they believe was kidnapped by their family driver.; Gardo Versoza as Gary – Miriam's husband. He always guides Miriam in all her searching for Ogie. However, he nearly loses hope that they will ever find Ogie again.
14	Inheritance	As Santino searches for his real mother, through the way of "lukso ng dugo" (a feeling), he meets a young woman named Abby, who helped him when he was lost. Santino thought that Abby is his mother as he felt a great connection between them, however, Abby is too young to be his mother, which Abby herself implies. Abby is the granddaughter of the owner of the best known Tocino branch in the Philippines, "Tocino King". Her grandfather wants her to inherit the business; however, Abby does not feel a great perseverance to accept the offer.: KC Concepcion as Abigail Lorraine "Abby" Cruz – A young woman who will meet Santino. She is the granddaughter of the owner of a food company known as "Tocino King". Abby then studies in America; however, his grandfather wants her to inherit the company. Abby is coming in great crisis either to accept the offer or not. Toward the end of the chapter, she accepts the offer. It is also implied that Boy George has a crush on her.; Charlie Davao† as Don Carlos – Abby's grandfather, some businessmen wanted to buy his company, yet he does not want to because he is willing to inherit it to his granddaughter Abby. However, Abby at first does not want to accept it.; Returning characters: Ejay Falcon as Boy George – Boy George returns Bagong Pag-asa to pay a visit. At the same time, he met Abby and fell in love with her. Now, Boy George is having troubles on how to court Abby.
15	Return	As Miriam and Gary are leaving Bagong Pag-asa, they meet Janet while having problems with their car. Miriam and Janet share their stories about the people they have been looking for. Miriam instantly realizes that Janet's story fits with Santino's life story. Meanwhile, Malena and Selda's mother Doña Anita returns to Bagong Pag-asa, where she started to connect with the characters' life. The recollection with Selda due to their conflict about Selda marrying a policeman, Anita meeting her granddaughter and the never-ending punishment of harsh words to Malena's husband, Enrique.: Ron Morales as Robert Sanchez/ Gustavo Policarpio – Doña Anita's personal assistant who practically takes care of every file Doña Anita got. He has worked for Doña Anita since she was in the United States, he previously took care of Doña Anita's case. It is later revealed that he is the younger brother of Enrique or Gonsalvo Policarpio.; Returning characters: Lorna Tolentino as Miriam – Miriam and her husband continue their search for their son. They then meet Janet who brings a great miracle in Santino's life.; Gardo Versoza as Gary – Miriam's husband who continues his search for his son. He, along with his wife, then meets Janet who brings a great miracle in Santino's life.; Andrea del Rosario as Janet – A woman who searched for her best friend in the town of Bagong Pag-asa. It was later revealed that her friend was Teresa Malimban, a woman connected to the lives of people of Bagong Pag-asa. She found out that her friend was dead more than 5 years ago and later decided to search for Teresa's son (who is Santino).; Liza Lorena as Doña Anita Rodriguez – Malena and Selda's mother. After living in the United States for several years, she returns to the Philippines to pay a visit to the family together with Stella and her personal assistant, Robert.
16	Hope	Santino and Paco are kidnapped by a gang who make little children beg in the streets. They also somehow sell children to couples who are unlikely to get pregnant. As Santino stays in the gang, he met Tatay Ben, a lonely old man who's the leader of the gang. In this whole new world of pain and suffering, Santino will derive to survive. Meanwhile, Father Paul was shot by one of Father Ben's allies and was taken in the hospital, where his family came to visit him. Santino then finally have returned home at the right time to heal Father Paul.: Johnny Delgado† as Tatay Ben – the leader of the gang who kidnaps children to beg in the streets.; Mark Bautista as Victorio – the father of Angelie (one of the kidnapped children). He soon reunites with his daughter after she escaped from Tatay Ben's household.; Matet de Leon – as Kim -Father Paul's sister. She visited Father Paul as he was admitted in the hospital after being shot by one of Santino's kidnappers.; Carl John Barrameda as Ryan – a kid who is a member of the gang who kidnaps children. He uses toys as baits to attract the kids. He admitted to Santino that his older brother was killed years before after drowning in the river. Afterwards, he went to Manila and met Tatay Ben. He told Santino that Tatay Ben is a very bad person, and plans to escape along with Santino and the other children.; Lloyd Zaragoza as Pedro – one of Tatay Ben's workers who is actually a good guy, as he helps the children when they are in trouble. He also has a crush on a public school teacher named Anna.; Marvin Yap as Juan – one of Tatay Ben's workers.; Archie Adamus as Andong – Tatay Ben's right-hand man when his gang entering Bagong Pag-Asa and tries to kidnapped Santino and Paco. He was shot by the police after attempting to kidnap another pair of children. He told Father Paul's sister that if he will live, tell him that he is asking for forgiveness.; Jacob Dionisio as Leopoldo/Leo – one of the children to beg in the streets, he has been having severe coughs lately.; Philip Nolasco as Sid/Sidney – one of the kidnapped children and is a child genius.; Chacha Cañete as Cutie – one of the kidnapped children.; Tom Olivar – Manila Police Chief who helps Mario and Father Jose to find Santino and Paco who were kidnapped by Tatay Ben's armed men when Angelie was escaped from Tatay Ben and returns to her father, Victorio.
17	Justice	Pedro and Juan helps the kids escape from Tatay Ben's household. Tatay Ben then gets arrested and Santino told Angelie that he will return to Bagong Pag-Asa when the former healed the latter's mother. Santino and Paco return to Bagong Pag-Asa as classes were to resume and they have a Father's Day program. Meanwhile, Mario is sacked from the police force by his boss due to alleged insubordination and AWOL. Mario later chokes the police chief in the neck for insulting the former's dead father, also a former policeman. This results in a huge blow to Mario, whose daughter would have praised him in their Father's Day program. Santino will then urge Enrique to do something for Mario. People will hold rallies for Mario, whom they regard as a hero. Don Miguel dies despite Fr. John's bringing of Santino to heal him, and as Doña Anita prepares to reconcile with Selda, Stella's parentage is revealed. Returning characters: Dante Rivero as Don Miguel Delgado† – father of Father John. He initially refused Brother John's plan of being a priest, but with Santino's help, he attended his son's ordination. At this time he was diagnosed with Stage 4 colon cancer. Though Father John wants Santino to save his life, he is ready to die.; Nanding Josef as Manding – as the helper of Don Miguel who gave the news to Father John about his father's condition. Later was entrusted the whole hacienda.; Peewee O'Hara – as Manding's wife
18	Runaway	Mario is forced to leave his family alone due to the gossips and the shame of the revealed fact that Stella is his daughter. As their family goes to crisis, Malena's whole family has persecuted her, from her mother to her husband. Selda is also suffering as she seeks for a sign from God, if she would ever need to forgive Mario for what he has done. Meanwhile, at the middle of the night a big surprise has startled the monastery as Brother Chi's sister seeks for help after being forced to marry a man she does not love. Selda forgives Mario and reconciles with her mom, while Alex' father tries to relocate his daughter's wedding in Bagong Pag-asa, despite opposition from the priests.: Toni Gonzaga as Alex Wang – Brother Chi's sister who runs away during her wedding dress fitting and seek help from her brother.; Ricardo Cepeda as Wilson Wang – Alex and Father Chi's rich father. He is a Chinese businessman who forces his daughter to get married just to save their family business; Mico Palanca as Bong – Alex's ex-boyfriend whom she broke up with after her father has made him leave her.; Chesca Inigo as Raquel Wang – Alex and Father Chi's mother.; Kontin Roque as Philip Chua – the man who Alex's father is being forced to her to get married with.; Michael Conan as Dante Maoricio – a new Police officer assigned his mission to Bagong Pag Asa
19	Past	Meanwhile, Santino meets a street vagrant after being bullied by children. Santino, along with his friends, helped the poor woman and took her to Selda's house, where Selda has cleaned her up. However, the vagrant is unable to speak due to trauma or whatever has happened to her in the past. Santino takes the vagrant for a stroll in the cemetery where he introduced her to the priests and to "Bro". Santino healed the woman and later finally remembers her name, Ina. Ina after a long time in trauma, somehow, could not remember anything from her past except for her name. She then dreams about a guy named Andrew, whom she believes is her best friend.: Maricar Reyes – as Ate Ina – a "taong grasa" or a street vagrant whom Santino helped after being bullied by the public people.; Jason Abalos – as Andrew† – Ina's best friend since high school who took care of her after her parents have died. He's an aspiring pilot, which signifies the "airplane toy" that Ina always brings with her. He died after trying to protect Ina from a group of bad guys.
20	Revenge	Doña Anita is having difficulties about the case she is involved with. Because of the matter becoming serious, she swallows her pride and asked Enrique for help. Meanwhile, Doña Anita is accused and imprisoned for murders that happened when her men were evicting people from her land; however, Enrique refuses to help her but instead seeks revenge for the past sins his mother-in-law did to him. Anita suffers a heart attack and is hospitalized. It was later revealed that the couple that was murdered in Sitio Hulo was the parents of Enrique. It's also revealed that Enrique was the one behind the recent accusations to Doña Anita because he wants revenge.: Jairus Aquino – as Young Enrique/ Gonzalvo Policarpio – as a young kid, Enrique lost both of his parents after Doña Anita's men accidentally killed them.; Bert Martinez as Enrique's father – Albert Martinez's (real-life) father made an appearance on the show.; Liza Lorena as Doña Anita Rodriguez – Doña Anita was captured and imprisoned after being accused for the murder that happened to Bagong Pag-asa 30 years ago.; Ron Morales as Robert Sanchez/Gustavo Policarpio – He has worked for Doña Anita since she was in the States, he also now takes care of Doña Anita's case. It is later revealed that he is the younger brother of Enrique or Gonzalvo Policarpio.; William Lorenzo as Enrique and Robert's father.
21	Sacrifice	Father Patrick receives a letter regarding his younger brother Jepoy. He finds out that Jepoy have given up his studies to work as a fisherman to earn money for the family. Hence, Father Patrick quickly asks for Father Anthony's permission to leave and go back home. Santino with Father Jose and Father Paul joined Father Patrick in his way back to their province which turned out to be a seaside. As they arrive they saw Jepoy about to leave with one of the fishermen in the middle of the night. After learning that the person Jepoy is working with uses dynamite when fishing, Father Patrick stops him as he think this is way too dangerous for a child to handle. Jepoy gets mad at Father Patrick and later starts to explain to him why he needs to earn money.: Makisig Morales as Jepoy – Father Patrick's younger brother who, unknown from Father Patrick, had given up his studies to start working. He has completely abandoned his childhood unlike other children who always plays, he spends his time working as a fisherman to earn money.; Jeffrey Santos – as Anton – one of the fishermen who Jepoy works with. Father Patrick learns that he uses dynamite when fishing – which is illegal.
22	Rivalry	A surprise visit shocks Baby after her sister, Delilah, drops by for a visit. Apparently, she did not just comeby for a visit, she came of help with her problem, money-wise. Delilah has lost most of her money, and went for Baby in need of help. It turns out that Baby hates her so much, because their father had always liked Delilah over her. As she stays in Baby's place, she did not feel welcomed by her sister. She was very nice and very joyful when meeting people including Santino. Baby got jealous and started a rumour that she is a witch, which the public easily believed after an unknown illness has struck the people. She was boycotted by the townspeople where she was forced to run to the monastery to seek help.: Ai-Ai Delas Alas as Delilah – Baby's half-sister. Between the siblings, she is the most favorite one of their parents. She used to be rich, but because of some problems, she lost all her money. She pays a visit to Baby to find some comfort, who is not enthused to see her. She was then mistaken by the townspeople as a witch after Baby had started the rumor that she is one.

No.	Title	Original release date
Week 14 (66–70)
66	"Carla Runs Away with Judith and Their Mother"	May 6, 2009
67	"Manolo Is Finally Enlightened"	May 7, 2009
68	"The Lonely Couple Is Persistent to Find Their Long Lost Child"	May 8, 2009
69	"Father Jose Gets Emotional"	May 11, 2009
70	"Santino Goes Home with Gary and Miriam"	May 12, 2009
Week 15 (71–75)
71	"Gary and Miriam Discover That Santino Is Not Their Son"	May 13, 2009
72	"Miriam Breaks the Painful News to Santino"	May 14, 2009
73	"Abby Bumps Into Santino"	May 15, 2009
74	"Abby Turns Down Her Grandfather's Offer"	May 18, 2009
75	"Carlos Decides to Give Up His Business"	May 19, 2009
Week 16 (76–80)
76	"Abby Decides to Take Over the Company"	May 20, 2009
77	"Santino Finds Out That Teresa Could Be His Real Mother"	May 21, 2009
78	"Teresa's Body Is Missing"	May 22, 2009
79	"Enrique Develops a Sense of Compassion"	May 25, 2009
80	"Stella Is Back in Town with Grandmother, Doña Anita"	May 26, 2009
Week 17 (81–85)
81	"Santino Gets Abducted"	May 27, 2009
82	"Santino Treads the Busy Streets of Manila"	May 28, 2009
83	"Santino Gains Tatay Ben's Praises"	May 29, 2009
84	"Angelie Successfully Escapes Tatay Ben's Household"	June 1, 2009
85	"Angelie Reunites with Her Father"	June 2, 2009
Week 18 (86–90)
86	"Doña Anita Learns That Joy Is Her Granddaughter"	June 3, 2009
87	"Ryan Become Friends with Santino"	June 4, 2009
88	"Father Paul's Life Is in Danger"	June 5, 2009
89	"Santino and Paco Return to Bagong Pag-asa"	June 8, 2009
90	"Mario Gets Dismissed from Service"	June 9, 2009
Week 19 (91–95)
91	"The Whole Town Protests Against Mario's Dismissal"	June 10, 2009
92	"Enrique Grants Santino's Request"	June 11, 2009
93	"Lolo Miguel's Life Is in Critical Condition"	June 12, 2009
94	"Father John Lets His Father Go"	June 15, 2009
95	"Santino Learns Anita's Weakness"	June 16, 2009
Week 20 (96–100)
96	"Mario Learns That He Is Stella's Real Father"	June 17, 2009
97	"Malena's Secret Is Finally Made Public"	June 18, 2009
98	"Mario Leaves Home"	June 19, 2009
99	"Santino Tries to Help Joy with Her Family Problem"	June 22, 2009
100	"Anita Talks to Selda about Her Conflict with Mario"	June 23, 2009
Week 21 (101–105)
101	"Father Chino Receives a Surprising Visitor"	June 24, 2009
102	"Alex's Wedding Is Moved to Bagong Pag-asa"	June 25, 2009
103	"Father Anthony Refuses to Lead Alex's Wedding"	June 26, 2009
104	"Alex Finally Submits to Her Father's Desire"	June 29, 2009
105	"Bong Comes to Alex's Rescue"	June 30, 2009
Week 22 (106–110)
106	"Alex Finds Out about Her Father's Scheme"	July 1, 2009
107	"Anita Swallows Her Pride and Asks for Enrique's Help"	July 2, 2009
108	"Donya Anita's Secret Is Revealed"	July 3, 2009
109	"Donya Anita Is Prosecuted"	July 6, 2009
110	"Anita Goes to Jail"	July 7, 2009
Week 23 (111–115)
111	"Malena Tricks Her Own Mother"	July 8, 2009
112	"Ina Finally Regains Her Lost Memories"	July 9, 2009
113	"Ina Learns That Andrew Is in Love with Her"	July 10, 2009
114	"Enrique Turns Out to Be the Sought After Gonzalgo Policarpio"	July 13, 2009
115	"Father Patrick Learns about His Family's Dilemma"	July 14, 2009
Week 24 (116–120)
116	"The Orphanage Gets Burnt Down"	July 15, 2009
117	"Everybody in Town Works Hand in Hand to Search for Father Patrick"	July 16, 2009
118	"Donya Anita Pleads Not Guilty"	July 17, 2009
119	"The Nun from the Orphanage Recognizes Enrique"	July 20, 2009
120	"Mario Discovers Enrique's True Identity"	July 21, 2009
Week 25 (121)
121	"Delilah Gets Chased by Enraged Townsmen"	July 22, 2009

==== Chapters 22–27 (Episodes 122–155) ====
Chapter number	Chapter name	Summary
22	Rivalry	A surprise visit shocks Baby after her sister, Delilah, drops by for a visit. Apparently, she did not just comeby for a visit, she came of help with her problem, money-wise. Delilah has lost most of her money, and went for Baby in need of help. It turns out that Baby hates her so much, because their father had always liked Delilah over her. As she stays in Baby's place, she did not feel welcomed by her sister. She was very nice and very joyful when meeting people including Santino. Baby got jealous and started a rumour that she is a witch, which the public easily believed after an unknown illness has struck the people. She was boycotted by the townspeople where she was forced to run to the monastery to seek help.: Ai-Ai Delas Alas as Delilah – Baby's half-sister. Between the siblings, she is the most favorite one of their parents. She used to be rich, but because of some problems, she lost all her money. She pays a visit to Baby to find some comfort, who is not enthused to see her. She was then mistaken by the townspeople as a witch after Baby had started the rumor that she is one.
23	Epidemic	Since the hospital is starting to overflow with patients infected with the West Nile virus, the doctor facilitating the health center decides to close their doors to other incoming patients. The event further enrages everybody in town, thus causing Mayor Enrique to take immediate action. In order to cure everybody in town, Enrique finally seeks the help of a doctor with expertise on infectious diseases, Dr. Marcelito Azarcon. It turns out that Dr. Marcelito is a previous resident of Bagong Pag-Asa where he met his first love Patricia, however, chose his career path over her. As he returns to Bagon Pag-Asa, he met Santino in the church where they had a little talk. Lito told Santino that he does not believe in God, he thinks that its only one way to let other people feel calm during problem and science is always the one finding that solution. As he help stop the disease, he discovered that Patricia has leukemia after being badly infected by the West Nile virus. Lito seeks help to Santino to heal Patricia, which Santino granted.: Christopher de Leon as Dr. Marcelito "Lito" Azarcon – a doctor who have helped Bagong Pag-asa after a mild illness has struck in the midst of the people. He does not have faith to God because he believes that only science and the people's freewill can make their wanted things to happen. It was also later revealed that he had a relationship with Nurse Patricia but broke up because he chose his career over her.; Ana Capri as Patricia – a nurse in the hospital in Bagong Pag-asa. It was later revealed that she had a relationship with Dr. Azarcon, but apparently broke up because Marcelito chose his job over her. It was also revealed that she has leukemia.; John Wayne Sace as Arnel – a guy who was trapped in Bagong Pag-asa during the epidemic. He was supposed to come to his mother's funeral.; Joseph Bitangcol as Bryan – Pam's boyfriend, who is trying to get into Bagong Pag-asa to tend to his pregnant girlfriend, he is with Cocoy. Before he could not handle the fact that he was going to be a father and ran away. Now he is ready and is trying to get to Pam.; Dianne Medina as Pam – Bryan's pregnant girlfriend, who is trapped in Bagong Pag-asa and stayed in the monastery. Pam dreams of getting married at the church in Bagong Pag-asa because her parents got married there; Benjie Felipe as Arturo† – a man that Malena paid to destroy Mayor from the public.
24	Pestilence	After surpassing the town epidemic, it seems that Bagong Pag-asa is about to face another dilemma. To everybody's surprise, a threatening swarm of locusts suddenly attacks the whole town giving problems to the farmers, an alarming number of cockroaches destroying the town's livestock and a group of wild animals such as rats and snakes scaring the townspeople. It was later discovered that whats causing the animals to move and wonder about is the activities being done by an active volcano nearby, which apparently disturbs them. However, the townspeople does not seem to believe this and through Malena's plans, they rather believe that Mayor Enrique is a pest in town spreading bad luck around the people. Meanwhile, Santino is helped by a taho vendor named Moy. Santino learns more about his new friend Moy through the latter's daughter Grace. The little girl reveals that her father currently has 4 jobs in order to get them though each and every day. Aside from that, she also shares to Santino that her mother had left them before due to her father's lack of wealth. To Grace's surprise, her mother unexpectedly returns. Upon his wife's sudden comeback, Moy is in fact glad; but he just could not help but fear the thought that she might take their child away from him sooner or later.: Vhong Navarro as Moy – A taho vendor who was struck in the midst of the locust invasion. Since his wife left him, he ended up as a single father who does everything just to take care of his only child, Grace. They have a dog named Rocky.; Mylene Dizon as Jackie – Moy's wife. She went abroad to find work without even saying goodbye to Moy. Now she came back richer than before and tries to take Grace away from Moy.; Erin Panlilio as Grace – Moy and Jackie's daughter. Grace did not want to live with her mom because she knows for the fact that Jackie have abandoned them due to lack of money. As part of her wishes, she only wants to be with her father, her grampa Pilo and their dog, Rocky.; Rocky – a German Shepherd dog owned by Moy and Grace. He has been with the family for quite a long time and have apparently been a special part of them.
25	Home	Moy is disappointed upon granting the 5 wishes of his daughter Grace. Specially the first one in which she wishes that both of them will always be together for Moy has finally decided to give Grace to Jackie; thinking that the latter could take better care of their child. Another of Grace's wishes is to be with his grandfather, Pilo, who is in the home for the aged. Pilo was left by his son in the center due to lack of money. After being given to Jackie, Grace thought that she was just kidnapped by her mother without her father knowing, so she ran away back to the monastery to come back for Moy. Moy then later explained to Grace everything which she could not really understand. After being returned to Jackie again, Grace runs away for the second time, but this time she went to her grandfather in Manila. Riding on a banana delivery truck, Grace invites Santino to join her. Santino, in worries for Grace came along. The whole monastery and Grace's parent have panicked due to the children's disappearance. After looking for them, they figured out that the two maybe in Manila with Pilo. They went to the home for the aged and asked Pilo, but denies that Grace and Santino are with him. It was later revealed that they actually are, and Pilo was just hiding them in his room. Pilo worries about Grace being taken away, so he ran away from the Home and took the kids in an old house to hide. However, a tricycle driver mistook Pilo as a pedophile and reported him to the police, where Jackie figured out that the girl being reported is Grace. In the middle of the night, the three were surrounded by the police. Although being surrounded, no one knew that the guy being mistaken as a criminal was Pilo. It was later revealed that it was actually Pilo when Moy and the others arrive at the old house. Pilo refuses to give Grace up to the police even though three snipers have been targeted on him. Jackie decided that she would not take Grace anymore, as long as Pilo would give her up. Pilo gave up the children and although Jackie promised, she still tried to take Grace away, but after a talk to Santino, she decided to leave Grace with Moy, however, to give her a better life, she would help pay for Grace's needs. The family then rejoices as they are finally back together again.: Dolphy as Pilo – Moy's father whom he never have spoken to in ages. He's in a home for the aged.; Lou Veloso as Paeng – one of the old people in the home for the aged. He helped Pilo to run away from the home.; Ramil Rodriguez as Pedring – one of the old people in the home for the aged. He offered his old house as a hiding place for Pilo and the children.; Nina Dolino – Paeng's daughter.; Martin del Rosario – Pedring's grandson.
26	Care	Santino and the priests in the monastery meet a girl named Sara, who is then accompanying a special child named Val. The young lady introduces the child as her own son. According to her, she and the boy escaped from his spiteful husband with completely nothing at hand. The next day, Santino and his friends drop by their household in order to befriend them. To Sara's surprise, Val seems to be completely receptive of Santino's intention to extend a friendly hand. Meanwhile, the town is planning to have a celebration from all the pestilence that have happened. A surprising event happened on a rehearsal, where Val shows a talent of playing the piano. Upon seeing the child's skills, he was considered as a gifted child by the townspeople where everybody had talks about him. As Val's fame rises, his father have discovered where Sara and the child is hiding. The father surprises everyone on one of the practice session of the celebration where he revealed that Sara is not the child's real mother. She was only a caregiver who took the kid and tells everyone that he is her own son. On Sara's side, she explain that the kid in not being given good care by his father, he was always being scold for and sometimes being hid from the public by imprisoning him in a room. The father, Carlo, explains that he hates Val because when his wife was giving to him, an unexpected problem happened which caused her death. Carlo later slowly realizes that it is his own fault why the child was driven away from him. As he hears his son play, he remembers his wife who is also a pianist, and through his son's music, he realizes that Val is a remembrance from his wife. After the celebration, he promised that he will never be ashamed about his son again and will be proud of him no matter what. He also dropped that charges for Sara.: Bea Alonzo as Sara – A woman who was taking care of Val, a special child. She presumes that she was Val's mother and she is trying to hide from their husband because she is being abused. It was later revealed that she was not really the kid's mother, but the family's caregiver. She kidnapped the kid because his father does not take care him. She loves Val too much because she also had an autistic older sister who died after being hit by a jeep.; Nash Aguas as Joey/Val – The child who was with Sara, which everyone assumed as his mother. He's autistic which makes it hard for him to communicate with other people, especially kids his own age. On a church celebration, he was revealed to be a gifted child on playing the piano. His mother died after giving birth to him.; Vice Ganda as Maxie – Sara's gay best friend. He is a Vilmanian and a joyful person. He went with Sara to help them hide from her husband.; Ryan Eigenmann as Carlo – Joey/Val's father. He went in Bagong Pag-asa upon knowing that this is where the caregiver he hired took his kid. He hates Val because his wife died after giving birth to him.
27	Lost	Malena identifies Tilde to be Enrique's secret girlfriend. Upon realizing this, Malena relentlessly drags the young lady out of the monastery to confront her regarding the matter. Tilde fails to deny the allegation, thus causing Malena to make a big scene in front of everybody. The said revelation further heightens up her hatred against her husband; and on her personal enumeration of all the troubles Enrique caused her, truth has been told that Enrique is in fact Santino's real father. Meanwhile, fed up with his parents' constant warring, Rico suddenly decides to run away. Upon learning this, Santino together with three of his other friends decide to chase him and convince him to come back home. Enrique, the priests and the children's families mistakenly believe the kids were kidnapped. The children then succeed on convincing the boy but they faced trouble on their way back to their town. Aside from being lost in the middle of nowhere without food and water, Rico ends up being caught in quicksand. On Santino's way to help the poor boy out, he too falls in the trap. Their other friends rescued them, but they have not returned yet to Bagong Pag-asa. It is also revealed that the place they are in is the hideout of insurgents and criminals. The kids then seek help from someone living in the forests, but it turns out that he is a member of the gang, "Batang Iwahid" (Iwahid Kid). Batang Iwahid is a group of young teenager boys based in the town of San Isidro who either rob people, kidnap them for ransom. However, they never kill citizens, they are only getting blamed for what the other gangs do. They shoot Enrique while he and the policemen were finding Santino and the other kids; Enrique survives as Santino prays over him while he was under the kidnappers, and the search for the children goes on. Some of the other children were able to be rescued, but Santino was still being held captive. It seems that the rebel group's leader, Froilan, has a special income-generating plan for the child. Upon learning this, Enrique hassles the authorities' search and rescue operation, in order to save their town's hailed child, and promote his political agenda as well. On the other hand, Malena runs out of town with her son Rico to get Enrique, and her growing love for him, out of her mind once and for all, which immediately infuriates the latter. Santino, however, was then rescued by the police, with Froilan and his men going to jail.: Bing Pementel as Lilia – mother of Heide, whom Santino healed first in the town where the gang have brought to make money over his abilities.; Ronnie Lazaro as Artemio – a man in which the gang seems to know. He's a resident in the place where the gang have brought Santino. He has a plan to save Santino from the gang.; Pamela Mae F. Juan as Heide – daughter of Lilia.; Igi Boy Flores as Randy – a member of the Batang Iwahid gang.; Renzo Cruz as Froilan – leader of another gang together with the Batang Iwahid. He's the brother of the leader of Batang Iwahid.; EJ Jallorina as Abner – the leader of the Batang Iwahid gang.; Returning characters: Chin-Chin Gutierrez as Teresa Malimban† – Malena remembers the day she met Teresa Malimban.; Kaye Abad as Minerva – After the children's disappearance, Minerva came searching for her son, Alfred.; Eva Darren as Lola Belen – Noticing that Paco is lost, his grandmother came searching for her grandson.

No.	Title	Original release date
Week 25 (122–125)
122	"Malena Is Desperate to Be Able to Walk Again"	July 23, 2009
123	"Anita Decides to Plead Guilty"	July 24, 2009
124	"Bagong Pag-asa Is on Quarantine"	July 27, 2009
125	"Enrique Seeks the Help of an Expert"	July 28, 2009
Week 26 (126–130)
126	"Dr. Marcelito Azarcon Arrives in Bagong Pag-asa"	July 29, 2009
127	"Dr. Lito Discovers That His Wife Has Leukemia"	July 30, 2009
128	"Santino Cures Everyone in Bagong Pag-asa"	July 31, 2009
129	"Another Plague Strikes Bagong Pag-asa"	August 3, 2009
130	"Moy's Wife Returns"	August 4, 2009
Week 27 (131–135)
131	"Bagong Pag-asa Sees Enrique as Their Town's Bad Luck"	August 5, 2009
132	"Jackie Tells Moy That She Is Already Married"	August 6, 2009
133	"Grace Gets Bitten by a Rat"	August 7, 2009
134	"Moy Hands Grace Over to Jackie"	August 10, 2009
135	"Grace Runs Away"	August 11, 2009
Week 28 (136–140)
136	"Grace and Santino Go to Manila"	August 12, 2009
137	"Pilo Hides Grace and Santino"	August 13, 2009
138	"Moy Is Reunited with Grace Once Again"	August 14, 2009
139	"The Monastery Starts Helping Sarah and Her Special Son, Val"	August 17, 2009
140	"Sarah Gets a Little Jumpy"	August 18, 2009
Week 29 (141–145)
141	"Sarah Gets Arrested"	August 19, 2009
142	"Carlo Learns to Appreciate Val"	August 20, 2009
143	"Malena Discovers That Tilde is Enrique's Mistress"	August 21, 2009
144	"Rico Runs Away"	August 24, 2009
145	"Santino and His Friends Remain at Lost in the Forest"	August 25, 2009
Week 30 (146–150)
146	"Town's Chief-of-Police Assumes That the Kids Are Abducted by Terrorists"	August 26, 2009
147	"Enrique Gets Shot"	August 27, 2009
148	"Santino's Prayers Miraculously Help Enrique's Speedy Recovery"	August 28, 2009
149	"The Rebels Hold Santino Hostage"	August 31, 2009
150	"Santino Drops Unconscious"	September 1, 2009
Week 31 (151–155)
151	"Santino Is Saved"	September 2, 2009
152	"Santino Is Back in Bagong Pag-asa"	September 3, 2009
153	"A Cold War Between Enrique and the P Takes Place Once More"	September 4, 2009
154	"Enrique Discloses a Secret to Santino"	September 7, 2009
155	"Enrique Learns about Rico's Capture"	September 8, 2009

==== Chapter 28 (Episodes 156–160) ====
Chapter number	Chapter name	Summary
28	Choices	After saving Rico, Malena runs away with the kid after knowing that she still loves Enrique. In Malena's disappearance, Enrique launched his secret plan to build a town casino. The town was divided by the choices of Yes or No on the plan. A kidnapper then called Enrique if he wants his son back. Enrique gave a 1 million ransom money in exchange of his son. Havok is in the midst, when the farmers refuses to leave their land because of the building being planned to be made. Stampede accidentally happened after one of the farmers was shot. Santino was the most affected by the stampede, where he had a near death experience in the hospital and where he met his mother in Heaven telling him that it is not his time yet because he still needs to find his father.: Jennifer Illustre as Lorena – the wife of the farmer who was fatally shot but survived in a riot over the land where the casino will be built.; Returning characters: Chin-Chin Gutierrez as Teresa Malimban† – On a near death experience after being seriously hurt in a stampede, Santino meets his mother in heaven. However, Santino had not any physical contact with her. She said that "his father" (Enrqiue) still needs help.

No.	Title	Original release date
Week 32 (156–158)
156	"Enrique Recovers Rico"	September 9, 2009
157	"Enrique Learns That Stella and Malena Are Missing"	September 10, 2009
158	"A Stampede Puts Santino's Life in Danger"	September 11, 2009
159	"Santino Falls in a Coma"	September 14, 2009
160	"Santino Finally Wakes Up"	September 15, 2009

==== Chapter 28 (Episodes 161–179) ====
Chapter number	Chapter name	Summary
28	Choices	After surviving the stampede, the social workers showed up saying that they need to take Santino away due to the accident. Upon this, Enrique planned to take temporary custody of Santino so that he would not need to leave the town. Surprisingly, Malena finds her way back home after she accidentally fell asleep in a delivery truck bound to Atong and Baby's store; she is very weak so she has to be sent immediately to the hospital. During Enrique's visit with Rico and Santino, Malena grows inevitably furious. Enraged in anger, she persistently exclaims that Enrique is the one responsible for all her mishaps. Malena sneaks out of the hospital to purposely barge in Enrique's house; and there she shamelessly blames her husband and his newly adopted son, Santino, for all her mishaps. The next day, Malena unexpectedly bumps into Santino and Rico in the monastery. Immediately, she excitedly approaches her son, but refuses to even come near her; and after she accidentally hurts Santino on the incident, she finally realizes how attached his son has grown towards his undisclosed half-brother. Malena then pays Arturo to kidnap Santino; the latter agrees to do so in order to prevent he and his wife to have their child adopted. However, the wife of Arturo confessed to Father Jose about the situation. Whilst Father Jose told Mario about what could happen, Father Jose broke the seal of confession in exchange for Santino's safety.: Gerard Pizarras – The kidnapper who took Rico and Malena. He turns out to be working for Robert.; Jennifer Illustre as Lorena – the wife of the farmer who was fatally shot but survived in a riot over the land where the casino will be built.; Dindo Arroyo as Gregor Mendez – one of Robert's right hand men.; Returning characters: Chin-Chin Gutierrez as Teresa Malimban† – On a near death experience after being seriously hurt in a stampede, Santino meets his mother in heaven. However, Santino had not any physical contact with her. She said that "his father" (Enrqiue) still needs help.; Jairus Aquino – as Young Enrique/ Gonzalvo Policarpio – as a young kid, Enrique remembers the day his parents were killed. And now he starts comparing his childhood from another farmer's life.; Tess Antonio – the social worker who took Santino from the priests before. She again comes back to take Santino away because of the accident that occurred which nearly caused Santino's death.; William Lorenzo as Enrique and Robert's father.; Benjie Felipe as Arturo† – a man that Malena paid to kidnap Santino. It was later revealed that Malena just takes his family as her bait to make him do what she wants. His wife was about to take their kid for adoption, but with Malena's dirty money, he is able to keep his daughter. After a botched attempt to kidnap Santino and the ensuing chase by Mario, Arturo was killed when he was hit by a truck.; Erin Panlilio as Grace – Moy and Jackie's daughter and also Pilo's granddaughter. She is now going to the same school with Santino.

No.	Title	Original release date
Week 33 (161–165)
161	"Enrique Decides to Adopt Santino"	September 16, 2009
162	"Enrique Gets Santino's Temporary Custody"	September 17, 2009
163	"Malena Finds Her Way Back to Bagong Pag-asa"	September 18, 2009
164	"Malena Blames Enrique"	September 21, 2009
165	"Enrique Confronts Malena"	September 22, 2009
Week 34 (166–170)
166	"Malena Bribes a Town Councilor"	September 23, 2009
167	"A Controversial Video of Enrique Spread All Over Town"	September 24, 2009
168	"Enrique Asks for Malena's Help"	September 25, 2009
169	"Mayor's Name Gets Cleared"	September 28, 2009
170	"Stella Calls for Help"	September 29, 2009
Week 33 (171–175)
171	"Malena Identifies Stella's Necklace"	September 30, 2009
172	"Stella Is Still Alive"	October 1, 2009
173	"Malena Tries Extending Her Help to Enrique"	October 2, 2009
174	"Father Jose Unravels Lita's Confession"	October 5, 2009
175	"People in Bagong Pag-asa Start Losing Their Faith"	October 6, 2009
Week 36 (176–180)
176	"Rico Faces Trouble in School"	October 7, 2009
177	"Enrique Will Not Be Adopting Santino"	October 8, 2009
178	"Santino Returns to the Monastery"	October 9, 2009
179	"Someone Is Threatening Malena"	October 12, 2009

==== Chapter 29 (Episodes 180–195) ====
Chapter number	Chapter name	Summary
29	Foster	'Malena and Enrique started a reconcile. Rico and his family went back together again. Santino also started to reunite with the priests already. Meanwhile, the DSWD came to the monastery and needed to take Santino away from the priests because another couple saw the records of all the kids in the DSWD. They also saw the records of Santino so they planned to take Santino. The couple adopted Santino, but the wife tried to "re-live" her dead son in the person of Santino. This caused the couple problems, and it was decided that he be returned to the DSWD. Meanwhile, Rico's accident finally makes Malena a changed woman. Aside from paying Santino the proper apologies for all her misdeeds, Malena also drops by Baby and Ato's store to say sorry for all her shortcomings. Later, after having a fight with Tilde, Malena's fall off a cliff put her in a rather critical condition, which eventually led to her untimely death. Santino tries reviving her, just as Rico requested, but even his miraculous hands could not change Malena's fate. On the other hand, Tilde's previous threats to Malena instantly backfire. Incidentally, someone witnessed what she had done to Malena. Father Jose applies for a job in a nearby resort, but it was discovered that his workplace is actually a casino. Santino sees Enrique in the place; the latter asked him to remain silent about that, but the former refused. Jueteng is prevalent in Bagong Pag-Asa, and Mario and the other policemen begin to hunt down the perpetrators. It is revealed that Enrique himself is involved in jueteng.: Mickey Ferriols as Vicky/ Momskie – one of the parents who adopted Santino.; Bernard Palanca as Manny/ Dadskie – Vicky's husband.; Zymic Jaranilla as Junjun – Zaijian Jaranilla's sibling in real life.

No.	Title	Original release date
Weeks 36–37 (180–185)
180	"Santino Meets His New Parents"	October 13, 2009
181	"Santino Bids Bagong Pag-asa Goodbye"	October 14, 2009
182	"Santino Lives by Jun-jun's Shadow"	October 15, 2009
183	"Santino Joins an Ice Skating Competition"	October 16, 2009
184	"Dadskie Gets Fed Up"	October 19, 2009
185	"Momskie Finally Accepts Jun-jun's Death"	October 20, 2009
Week 38 (186–190)
186	"Malena Begs for Santino's Help"	October 21, 2009
187	"Malena Says Sorry to Santino"	October 22, 2009
188	"Santino Goes Out for a Trip"	October 23, 2009
189	"Malena Discovers That Tilde Is Her Stalker"	October 26, 2009
190	"Malena Falls Off a Cliff"	October 27, 2009
Week 39 (191–195)
191	"Malena Dies"	October 28, 2009
192	"Robert Reveals That He Is the Sole Witness of Tilde's Crime"	October 29, 2009
193	"Enrique Returns to His Old Self"	October 30, 2009
194	"Enrique Moves Out"	November 2, 2009
195	"Santino Gets a Shocking Discovery"	November 3, 2009

==== Chapters 29–30 (Episodes 196–218) ====
Chapter number	Chapter name	Summary
29	Foster	Jueteng is prevalent in Bagong Pag-Asa, and Mario and the other policemen begin to hunt down the perpetrators. It is revealed that Enrique himself is involved in jueteng.
30	Greed	Santino meets the infamous Aling Soledad, a grumpy old lady who happens to be everyone's enemy due to her remorseless greed. Pretty much aware of the scarcity of water in Bagong Pag-asa, she ends up selling her remaining supply for a pretty unreasonable price. Despite the old lady's bad reputation, Santino and his friends end up defending her from enraged neighbors; but instead of showing gratitude to the said kids, she ends up driving them away. On the other hand, the heat wave phenomenon in Bagong Pag-asa finally takes its toll on its residents; but despite the said fact, Enrique remains unmoved regarding the matter. Enrique then verbally harasses Mario, whom he accused of being Bagong Pag-asa's jueteng lord. A fire in Bagong Pag-asa destroyed Atong and Baby's livelihood; a newly wed [to Tilde] Enrique helped them, but in return they would have to blame Cocoy for the fire, even if the fire was just an accident. This causes the disappearance of both Cocoy and Santino from Bagong Pag-asa.: Ms. Gloria Romero† as Aling Soledad – a grumpy old lady who seems to be angry to anyone she meets. She has a water supply business.; Aldred Gatchalian as Young Romulo – Aling Soledad's husband; Jessie Mendiola as Young Soledad; Jojit Lorenzo as Agusto – a gambler who kidnapped Santino after losing a cockfight. He said that his solution for his money problems is to make money through Santino's abilities.; Returning characters: Dindo Arroyo as Gregor Mendez – one of Robert's right hand men as illegal gambling lord inside his residence from Bagong-Asa while Jose works with him as a chef. When Father Jose quit his work as a chef to Gregor. Robert and Enrique's orders and tries to plot to kill Father Anthony's life then Father Anthony was resurrected when Robert got angry to him.

No.	Title	Original release date
Week 40 (196–200)
SID	"Star ng Pasko"	November 4, 2009– December 31, 2009
196	"Enrique Seeks for Santino's Help"	November 4, 2009
197	"Enrique Despises Santino"	November 5, 2009
198	"Enrique Plans His Vengeance"	November 6, 2009
199	"Jueteng Invades Bagong Pag-asa"	November 9, 2009
200	"Paco Engages in Gambling"	November 10, 2009
Week 41 (201–205)
201	"Enrique Tries Killing Mario"	November 11, 2009
202	"Enrique Makes His Move"	November 12, 2009
203	"Mario Fails on His Mission"	November 13, 2009
204	"Bro Finally Shows His Rage"	November 16, 2009
205	"Santino Meets Aling Soledad"	November 17, 2009
Week 42 (206–210)
206	"Santino Saves Lola Soledad's Life"	November 18, 2009
207	"Mario Gets Frame Up"	November 19, 2009
208	"Enrique Swears That Mario Would Rot in Jail"	November 20, 2009
209	"Enrique Finally Puts Tilde Out in the Open"	November 23, 2009
210	"Santino Heads a Signature Campaign"	November 24, 2009
Week 43 (211–215)
211	"Enrique and Tilde's Wedding Pushes Through"	November 25, 2009
212	"Father Anthony Gets Stabbed"	November 26, 2009
213	"Bro Brings Father Anthony Back to Life"	November 27, 2009
214	"Mario Decides to Run for Mayor"	November 30, 2009
215	"Enrique Resorts to a Yet Another Dirty Tactic"	December 1, 2009
Week 44 (216–218)
216	"Baby and Ato's House Get Burnt Into Ashes"	December 2, 2009
217	"Baby and Ato File an Arson Case Against Cocoy"	December 3, 2009
218	"Santino Is Missing"	December 4, 2009

==== Chapters 31–34 (Episodes 219–237) ====
Chapter number	Chapter name	Summary
31	Family	The authorities found a way to track down Cocoy; and in order to save Santino from the forthcoming pursuit, Cocoy then decides to leave his little brother alone in a safe place as he tries misleading his hunters. After the incident, Cocoy discovers that Santino has actually gone astray. And given the said situation, he is left with no other choice but to remain at large up until he finds the missing miracle kid. Incidentally, after obliviously walking around the streets of Manila to look for his big brother Cocoy, Santino finds himself spending sometime with Santa Claus. Santa Claus pursues his calling of giving out gifts from one house to another, and surprisingly, he ends up finding himself in his very own house. Immediately, his son Ramon recognizes him; but instead of greeting him with a hearty welcome, the lad instantly shoves him away. Ramon tries warning his younger sister Lea. Surprisingly, in contrast to her brother's display of disgust, Lea is somehow looking forward to see her biological father; so she makes it a plan to look for him before her time finally runs out. In order to fulfill his promise to Totoy, Santino drops by the hospital to lay his miraculous hand on Lea; and after successfully doing so, they rush to the precinct in order to check on Totoy's condition. Incidentally, Totoy had decided to donate his own heart in order to save his daughter's life but Santino heals Lea. Lea and Ramon reunion their estranged father named Totoy.: Pen Medina as Totoy -a man who disguises himself as Santa Claus after breaking out of jail. His only wish is to see and meet his youngest child who he has never met since birth to give her a toy he has dearly been kept. After being taken to jail, his wife died and both their children were sent to a home where they were both separated.; Shaina Magdayao as Lea – Totoy's long lost younger daughter. It was revealed that she is terminally ill due to heart disease and her last wishes is to finally meet her real father before she passes away, although she was healed by Santino.; Ping Medina as Ramon – Totoy's elder son.

Chapter number	Chapter name	Summary
32	Trust	In the midst of Santino and Jose's pursuit, Mia tries giving them a lift; and upon learning that they have no place to go, she gladly offers her house to be their temporary refuge. Incidentally, all these good deeds she has to offer have corresponding prices. Apparently, she is a self-professed material girl, and anything that could bring her cash is basically worth her while. During one of their conversations, Santino tells Mia about the 1-million-peso reward Enrique is giving out in exchange of him (wherein a lot of people are already searching for Santino out of this reward); and upon learning about this, the young lady could not help but feel the urge of getting her hand on the said bundle of cash. Upon getting her chance, Mia tricks Santino to come with her, alone. On the last minute, Mia changes her mind about bringing Santino back in Bagong Pag-asa. Surprisingly, she somehow grows guilt-stricken upon realizing how the kid actually trusts her with his dear life. Mia gets mad at her family, saying she has worked hard for them and yet they do not appreciate her for what she has been sacrificing for them; while she was driving a taxi, she was stabbed by robbers, and Santino healed her. Meanwhile, Gregor has been arrested and evidence soon implicates Robert in the illegal gambling in Bagong Pag-asa. Anita gets mad at Robert, whom she treated as her son.: Krista Ranillo as Mia – a tomboyish young woman who does every work that she just to give support for her family. She basically does everything she can, taxi driver or even becoming a circus entertainer.; Susan Africa as Isay – Mia's mother. She takes money from Mia that she says she needs for a very important use. It turns out she lied and used the money for her own selfish shenanigans. But in the end, she saved some of it for her daughter's user.; Empress Schuck as Danica – Mia's youngest sister; Charles Christianson as Julius – Mia's younger brother; Returning characters: Dindo Arroyo as Gregor Mendez – one of Robert's right hand men. He was arrested by Mario.
33	Joy	Father Jose's way to search for employment, he tries his luck in a job opening at Boss Jeff's house. Surprisingly, he instantly gets the job after the said employer brusquely fires the newly hired for the particular position. Incidentally, Boss Jeff is pretty notorious among his employees. Apparently, he is vastly cruel to them, most especially to those who work in his toy store.: Sam Milby as Jeff – commonly being called as "Boss Jeff", a crippled owner of a well-known toy store. Jeff was said to have been abused as a child causing him to lose his ability to walk this cause him to be mean to his workers.; Spanky Manikan as Mino – Buboy's father. Jeff's personal driver and housekeeper.; Ketchup Eusebio as Buboy – Jeff's assistant manager for the toystore.; Pokwang as Amy – a woman who gave some ice cream in a church choir. She claims that Santino healed a friend of hers before.
34	Alone	Santino escapes his pursuers with the help of a happy-go-lucky traveling sales lady named Libay.: Judy Ann Santos as Libay – a basket merchant who Santino met after running away from the kidnappers. It was later revealed that she is actually running away from her family, who is rich and wealthy. She said the reason she ran away is because she cannot carry on seeing her dad suffer.

No.	Title	Original release date
Weeks 44–45 (219–223) – May Bukas Pa: Christmas Special
219	"Santino and Cocoy Reach Manila"	December 7, 2009
220	"Cocoy Loses Santino"	December 8, 2009
221	"Mario and Enrique Engage in a Fistfight"	December 9, 2009
222	"The Man Hunt for Cocoy Finally Begins"	December 10, 2009
223	"Totoy Gets Arrested"	December 11, 2009
S1	"Bro, Ikaw ang Star ng Pasko: The 2009 ABS-CBN Christmas Special Part 1"	December 13, 2009
Weeks 45–46 (224–230) – May Bukas Pa: Krista Ranillo
224	"Santino Heals Lea"	December 14, 2009
225	"Santino Meets Mia"	December 15, 2009
226	"Mia Sells Out Santino"	December 16, 2009
227	"Ato Confesses Everything to Father Anthony"	December 17, 2009
228	"Cocoy Is Finally Set Free"	December 18, 2009
S2	"Bro, Ikaw ang Star ng Pasko: The 2009 ABS-CBN Christmas Special Part 2"	December 20, 2009
229	"Mario Arrests Bagong Pag-asa's Jueteng Lord"	December 21, 2009
230	"Tilde Learns about Enrique and Robert's Secret"	December 22, 2009
Weeks 47–48 (231–237) – May Bukas Pa: Sam Milby and Judy Ann Santos
231	"Santino Meets Boss Jeff"	December 23, 2009
232	"Santino Cures Boss Jeff"	December 24, 2009
233	"Mayor Enrique Asks for Apology to the People of Bagong Pag-asa"	December 25, 2009
S3	"Shoutout 2009: Wagi o Sawi? The ABS-CBN Yearend Special"	December 27, 2009
In this special, Santino narrates about New Year, with Pokwang inside a cannon launcher.
234	"Mario Searches Enrique's House"	December 28, 2009
235	"Mario Files His Certificate of Candidacy"	December 29, 2009
236	"Boss Jeff's Toy Store Gets Nabbed"	December 30, 2009
237	"Robert Leaves Bagong Pag-asa"	December 31, 2009

=== 2010s (2010–2013) ===
==== Chapter 34 (Episodes 238–240) ====
Chapter number	Chapter name	Summary
34	Alone	Upon learning that the poor kid is actually lost, the young lady gladly offers to help him go back home. In order to return the said favor, Santino then volunteers to help Libay with her sales; and together they go from town to town asking around for directions towards the small town of Bagong Pag-asa. She was then discovered by her brother, and asked to come home so that she could be with her father. It was revealed that Libay left her family because she could not carry on seeing her father suffering from Stage 4 cancer. Santino healed Libay's father.: Judy Ann Santos as Libay – a basket merchant who Santino met after running away from the kidnappers. It was later revealed that she is actually running away from her family, who is rich and wealthy. She said the reason she ran away is because she cannot carry on seeing her dad suffer.; Juan Rodrigo – Libay's father who has a stage 4-cancer.; Neil Ryan Sese as Rupert – Libay's brother.; Adriana Agcaoili as Leling – Libay's older sister.; Allan Paule as Onin – a man who was paid by Tilde to create a scene which she believes would make Enrique look like a "hero". He tried act as if he would drive off the school bus used by Santino and his class on their field trip.; Returning characters: Pokwang as Amy – she celebrated the New Year with Santino.

No.	Title	Original release date
Week 48 (238–240) – May Bukas Pa: Judy Ann Santos
238	"Santino Meets Libay"	January 1, 2010
SID	"Star ng Pasko"	January 1, 2010
239	"The Priests Perform a Vigil for Santino's Safety"	January 4, 2010
240	"Libay Finally Returns Home"	January 5, 2010

==== Chapter 34 (Episodes 241–243) ====
Chapter number	Chapter name	Summary
34	Alone	Allan Paule as Onin – a man who was paid by Tilde to create a scene which she believes would make Enrique look like a "hero". He tried act as if he would drive off the school bus used by Santino and his class on their field trip.

No.	Title	Original release date
Week 49 (241–243) – May Bukas Pa: Judy Ann Santos, Allan Paule, and Jay Manalo
241	"Santino Safely Returns to Bagong Pag-asa"	January 6, 2010
242	"Enrique Lifts the Cash Reward He Previously Offered"	January 7, 2010
243	"Tilde's Perfect Plan Goes Offhand"	January 8, 2010

==== Chapter 35 (Episodes 244–247) ====
Chapter number	Chapter name	Summary
35	Father	A strange man named Franco de Jesus roams around Bagong Pag-asa to search for Teresa Malimban; but instead of finding his former girlfriend, he ends up finding her son Santino instead. Upon learning about this said information, Franco instantly claims custody of the said kid; and in order to successfully do so, he tries seeking Mayor Enrique's help. Without hesitation, Enrique gives his full support to Franco's case. He instantly suggests a DNA test; and once the DNA test results prove that Franco is in fact Santino's biological father, the DSWD will then be awarding Santino's custody to him. After Enrique finds out that Franco is not the real father, Enrique decided to have a DNA test. It is thus proven that Enrique is Santino's real father, and the DNA sample Franco gave was actually Enrique's. Enrique then decided to back out of the mayoral race in order to spend more time with his children, and gets ready to face corruption charges that may be filed against him after leaving office.: Jay Manalo as Franco de Jesus – a man who claims that he is Santino's real father. He and Teresa had a previous relationship, but he and Tilde are just engaging in fraud.; Returning characters: Andrea del Rosario as Janet – A woman who searched for her best friend in the town of Bagong Pag-asa. It was later revealed that her friend was Teresa Malimban, a woman connected to the lives of people of Bagong Pag-asa. She found out that her friend was dead more than 5 years ago and later decided to search for Teresa's son Gabriel (who is Santino).

No.	Title	Original release date
Weeks 49–50 (244–247) – May Bukas Pa: Jay Manalo
244	"Franco Claims Custody of Santino"	January 11, 2010
245	"Franco Is a Fraud"	January 12, 2010
246	"Enrique Finally Learns about His Paternal Link to Santino"	January 13, 2010
247	"Robert Kidnaps Santino and Rico"	January 14, 2010

==== Chapters 35–36 (Episodes 248–251) ====
Chapter number	Chapter name	Summary
35	Father	Meanwhile, a fugitive Robert greets Enrique during his birthday, with Rico and Santino abducted by Robert. Mario and Enrique then pursue a chase against Robert, which leads to the death of Enrique and injuries to Rico during the rescue process.
36	Temptation	After Enrique's death, Tilde was arrested for being involved in the death of Malena. However, she was able to escape by pretending that she had gone into labor; while being driven, she got the gun of Dante, the policeman driving the vehicle. Rico was resentful of Santino because of their father's death. Santino then felt sad as he believes he was a bad luck due to the death of Enrique and the anger of Rico; Father Jose told him that he was not the Santino who was trying to be happy despite the hardships and trials. Meanwhile, Santino was being told by a voice (possibly Satan's) that he should come to it and he was cursed by Bro. He ends up being helped by angels on his way and ends up at a home for the homeless, run by Lola Milgaros, a blind grandmother.: Gloria Sevilla† as Lola Milagros – A blind old woman who is the owner of a home open to those who have no roof over their heads. Apparently, a rich businessman named Mr. Chan is trying to take the property where the home stands.

No.	Title	Original release date
Week 50 (248)
248	"Enrique Passes Away"	January 15, 2010
Weeks 50–51 (249–251) – May Bukas Pa: Gloria Sevilla
249	"Santino Starts Losing Faith in Bro"	January 18, 2010
250	"Santino Meets Lola Milagros"	January 19, 2010
251	"Rico Predicts the Future"	January 20, 2010

==== Chapters 36–37 (Episodes 252–254) ====
Chapter number	Chapter name	Summary
36	Temptation	After Enrique's death, Tilde was arrested for being involved in the death of Malena. However, she was able to escape by pretending that she had gone into labor; while being driven, she got the gun of Dante, the policeman driving the vehicle. Rico was resentful of Santino because of their father's death. Santino then felt sad as he believes he was a bad luck due to the death of Enrique and the anger of Rico; Father Jose told him that he was not the Santino who was trying to be happy despite the hardships and trials. Meanwhile, Santino was being told by a voice (possibly Satan's) that he should come to it and he was cursed by Bro. He ends up being helped by angels on his way and ends up at a home for the homeless, run by Lola Milgaros, a blind grandmother.: Gloria Sevilla† as Lola Milagros – A blind old woman who is the owner of a home open to those who have no roof over their heads. Apparently, a rich businessman named Mr. Chan is trying to take the property where the home stands.; Ryan Agoncillo as Paulo Peñaflor – A journalist and CBN News Reporter who went to Bagong Pag-asa after hearing about the news of Rico's encounter with "Bro". He was a former missionary but he abandoned that vocation when the chapel that he and his co-missionaries had built was bombed, resulting in the death of his colleagues and the people. He managed to save a crying baby but it also died even after he thought Jesus would help the baby. In his despair, he threw his cloak and went away with the dead baby. It was this event that triggered his loss of faith in Christ.
37	Believe	A journalist named Paulo Peñaflor arrives Bagong Pag-asa to search for a news feature regarding the miracles within the small town. And to his delight, he alone gets his hands on the most sensational news there is Rico's exclusive encounters with his so-called Bro (actually Satan). Though a non-believer of such events, Paulo pursues this rather controversial issue for his show's sake. Santino has now returned to Bagong Pag-asa, but his former petty argument with Rico turns out to be a completely heated dispute. Apparently, Santino tries relaying Bro's real message to Rico, which instantly infuriates the latter.: Ryan Agoncillo as Paulo Peñaflor – A journalist and CBN News reporter who went to Bagong Pag-asa after hearing about the news of Rico's encounter with "Bro". He was a former missionary but he abandoned that vocation when the chapel that he and his co-missionaries had built was bombed, resulting in the death of his colleagues and the people. He managed to save a crying baby but it also died even after he thought Jesus would help the baby. In his despair, he threw his cloak and went away with the dead baby. It was this event that triggered his loss of faith in Christ.

No.	Title	Original release date
Week 51 (252–254) – May Bukas Pa: Gloria Sevilla and Ryan Agoncillo
252	"Mr. Chan Tries Killing Lola Milagros"	January 21, 2010
253	"Santino Regains His Faith in Bro"	January 22, 2010
254	"Paulo Gets His Scoop"	January 25, 2010

==== Chapter 37 (Episodes 255–258), and Extended and Clean Feed Version (Episodes 1–258) ====
Chapter number	Chapter name	Summary
37	Believe	A journalist named Paulo Peñaflor arrives Bagong Pag-asa to search for a news feature regarding the miracles within the small town. And to his delight, he alone gets his hands on the most sensational news there is Rico's exclusive encounters with his so-called Bro (actually Satan). Though a non-believer of such events, Paulo pursues this rather controversial issue for his show's sake. Santino has now returned to Bagong Pag-asa, but his former petty argument with Rico turns out to be a completely heated dispute. Apparently, Santino tries relaying Bro's real message to Rico, which instantly infuriates the latter.: Ryan Agoncillo as Paulo Peñaflor – A journalist and CBN News reporter who went to Bagong Pag-asa after hearing about the news of Rico's encounter with "Bro". He was a former missionary but he abandoned that vocation when the chapel that he and his co-missionaries had built was bombed, resulting in the death of his colleagues and the people. He managed to save a crying baby but it also died even after he thought Jesus would help the baby. In his despair, he threw his cloak and went away with the dead baby. It was this event that triggered his loss of faith in Christ.

No.	Title	Original release date
Weeks 51–52 (255–258) – May Bukas Pa: Ryan Agoncillo
255	"A Heated Dispute Goes in Between Santino and Rico"	January 26, 2010
256	"Rico Witnesses a Rather Disturbing Premonition"	January 27, 2010
257	"Santino Performs Another Miracle"	January 28, 2010
258	"Paulo Takes Care of Santino"	January 29, 2010
May Bukas Pa: Extended and Clean Feed Version (Online and Jeepney TV)
1–258	"Same as before"	July 2012– December 4, 2013
After the show's two-year hiatus, an extended and clean feed version began to be uploaded online in July 2012 where some episodes on TFC replaced the show's original 2009–2010 ABS-CBN broadcast cut version with those without the network logo and MTRCB rating, and continued to be released through airing on its sister channel Jeepney TV, announced on February 28, 2013, from March 11, 2013.

==== Chapters 37–38 and Extended Last 5 Episodes (Episodes 259–263), and Specials ====
No.	Title	Original release date
Weeks 52–53 (259–263) – Chapters 37–38: Believe and Amen; Extended Last 5 Episodes
259–263	"See episodes titles below"	December 4, 2013– December 5, 2013
May Bukas Pa: Ang Huling Linggo (The Last Week/The Last 5 Nights)
259	"Santino Learns about Paulo's Past"	February 1, 2010
Paulo abandoned that vocation when the chapel that he and his co-missionaries had built was bombed, resulting in the death of his colleagues and the people. He managed to save a crying baby but it also died even after he thought Jesus would help the baby. In his despair, he threw his cloak and went away with the dead baby. It was this event that triggered his loss of faith in Christ.
Episodes 260–261: Joy's Kidnapping and Rescue, and Santino's Suffering
260	"Tilde Kidnaps Joy"	February 2, 2010
Santino has now returned to Bagong Pag-asa. Tilde deviously abducts Mario's daughter Joy, and requested that Santino be brought to her in exchange for Joy's release.
261	"Santino Falls in Tilde's Devious Grasp"	February 3, 2010
Santino then told Mario that he would respond to Tilde's request, Mario agreeing unconditionally out of his desperate situation. Although Mario would not be giving Santino to Tilde, the young boy was abducted by Tilde, who asked the former to cure her colon cancer. Tilde was enraged and locked him up in a closet when he refused to heal her since he has no more power to cure illnesses. He slams the closet door with his hands to let him out, but fails when Tilde tells to stay on it overnight, and continues until giving up. After Santino gives up, he tells Bro to help or hopes to get him out of the closet and Tilde while crying from a failed attempt.
Episodes 262–263: Santino's Suffering, Hospitalization for Chances of Survival, Death, Resurrection and Return to Normal Life, and 2011 Pope John Paul II Beatification Special
262 263 S4 S5	"Rico's Premonition about Santino Comes to Life" "Santino Surprises Everyone (May Bukas Pa: Ang Pagtatapos (The Finale))" "Sunday's Best: Banal"	February 4, 2010– December 5, 2013
Tilde insistently commands him to lay his miraculous hands on her. She continues to trap Santino inside the closet after an interrogation, telling her to go out by slamming and knocking its door with his hands and fist, respectively, but again failed where Tilde's anger and punishment towards him still persist. While being trapped, Santino tells a wish to Bro to reunite with his parents upon death. She released him from the closet after getting angry from not healing her due to the symptoms of a cancer now manifest by bleeding, causing an argument leading her to pushing Santino off a flight of stairs, causing Santino's head to hit pretty hard on the floor, thus, losing his consciousness—just as Rico once predicted. Santino was then hospitalized as a result. When his chances of survival were declining, the priests then decided to bring his dying body to the monastery. Santino dies in the monastery, and his wish to reunite with his parents was thus finally granted, though it caused deep grief to everyone. People then flocked to Bagong Pag-asa in order to pay the necessary respects to his remains. While funeral preparations were underway, Santino wakes up alive after he was told by his parents in the afterlife that the time for him to be reunited with him has not yet come, and he still needs to continue his mission on Earth, and this miracle was witnessed by Paolo, who saw the young boy standing alongside Bro. People of Bagong Pag-asa rejoiced upon seeing Santino alive once more. Paolo gives a narration on what hope for him is and how Santino changed his life. The resurrection brought back Paolo's faith in God. The deleted scene of an episode, originally aired on Jeepney TV on December 5, 2013, has priests meet with Paolo who is now also wearing a brown alb while Cocoy, Santino, and Fr. Jose Guillermo marching towards the priests. Fr. Anthony hugs Paolo and then Santino meets the latter where he performs a high five towards the boy as a sign of appreciation for helping him. Paolo puts his hand on Santino's head, and they turn away towards the church's altar. It was not shown on the original 2009–2010 ABS-CBN cut three years earlier on February 5, 2010 because of time constraints as it has commercial breaks when originally aired at the latter which made the show have a longer airtime than usual. The scene was only released and aired online and further releases of the episode, such as ABS-CBN Entertainment YouTube channel uploaded on November 16, 2015 and iWant, as well as on re-airings after the original airing of the said version. After the resurrection event, Santino prays to Bro for a final time asking for his parents in the afterlife. He bids goodbye to Bro and Santino lives a normal life thereafter by playing with his friends at the end of an episode and show's storyline. On the other hand, ABS-CBN aired 2 specials about Pope John Paul II leading to sainthood, with the first being Sunday's Best: Banál (Tagalog for "holy") to commemorate the beatification of Pope John Paul II (May 22, 2011). Zaijian Jaranilla and Jaime Fabregas reprised their roles as Santino and Father Anthony to present the life of the pope and his significance for Filipinos. This cumulated to his canonization three years later on April 27, 2014, with the special named John Paul II and John XXIII Mga Bagong Santo: The ABS-CBN News Special Coverage, with it covered on TV Patrol Weekend that followed.: Ryan Agoncillo as Paulo Peñaflor – A journalist and CBN News Reporter who went to Bagong Pag-asa after hearing about the news of Rico's encounter with "Bro".; Charo Santos-Concio as Virgin Mary, mother of Jesus; Pope John Paul II as himself, the 264th Pope of the Catholic Church that was beatified and canonized in 2011 and 2014, respectively.; The ASAP XV Singers/Choir during Santino's funeral (order of appearance): Kyle Balili, Erik Santos, Toni Gonzaga, Sam Milby, Aiza Seguerra, Nikki Gil, Vina Morales, Christian Bautista, Rachelle Ann Go, Duncan Ramos, Mark Bautista, Piolo Pascual, Martin Nievera, Zsa Zsa Padilla, Charice Pempengco, Jed Madela, Arnel Pineda; Returning characters: Chin-Chin Gutierrez (Teresa Malimban), Susan Roces† (Ms. Nieves Antazo), Ejay Falcon (Boy George), Rosanna Roces (Adela San Jose), Anne Curtis (Carla), Wendy Valdez (Judith), Evangeline Pascual (Myrna), Chinggoy Alonzo† (Mr. Manolo Sandoval), Toni Gonzaga (Alex), Sam Milby (Jeff), Mark Bautista (Victorio), KC Concepcion (Abby Cruz), Bernard Palanca (Manny/Dadskie), Mickey Ferriols (Vicky/Momskie), Bea Alonzo (Sara), Nash Aguas (Joey/Val), Shaina Magdayao (Lea), Christopher de Leon (Dr. Marcelito "Lito" Azarcon), Maricar Reyes (Ate Ina), Krista Ranillo (Mia), Vhong Navarro (Moy), Gabby Concepcion (Ricardo), Claudine Barretto (Julia), Gloria Romero† (Aling Soledad), Lorna Tolentino (Miriam), Gardo Versoza (Gary), Ai-Ai Delas Alas (Delilah), Judy Ann Santos (Libay), Dolphy† (Pilo); Actors died during production credited on finale episode: Johnny Delgado (Ben)† (died November 19, 2009 and funeral November 24, 2009)
