= List of Colegio de San Juan de Letran alumni =

This is a list of notable students and alumni of the Colegio de San Juan de Letran in Manila. The list includes people who have studied at various levels in the college, from elementary up to postgraduate education.

Note: The Bachiller en Artes (Bachelor of Arts or A.B.) degree during the Spanish colonial period is equivalent to today's high school diploma.

== Religion ==
=== Saints ===
Name	Year/degree	Notability	Reference
Saint Vicente Liem de la Paz, O.P.	trivium & quadrivium 1747–1750, Humanit.	Letran's foremost alumnus saint. He was born Phạm Hiếu Liêm in Tonkin to noble Christian parents. Martyred on November 7, 1773. One of the Vietnamese Martyrs canonized by Pope John Paul II in 1988.	
Saint Vicente Do Yen de San Pedro, O.P.	(no year indicated)	Martyred on June 8, 1838. One of the Vietnamese martyrs canonized by Pope John Paul II in 1988.	
Saint Pedro Duong de Santa Maria, O.P.	(no year indicated)	Martyred on December 18, 1838. One of the Vietnamese martyrs canonized by Pope John Paul II in 1988.	
Saint Domingo Tuoc, O.P.	(no year indicated)	Martyred on April 2, 1839. One of the Vietnamese martyrs canonized by Pope John Paul II in 1988.	
Saint Vicente Shiwozuka Dela Cruz, O.P.	(no year indicated)	One of the 16 Martyrs of Japan. Companion of Saint Lorenzo Ruiz.	
Saint Tomas Hioji Rokuzayemon Nishi de San Jacinto, O.P.	(no year indicated)	A Kirishitan. One of the 16 Martyrs of Japan.	
Saint Jacobo Kyushei Tomonaga de Santa Maria, O.P.	(no year indicated)	Born of a noble Christian family of Kyudetsu, in Kyushu, Japan in 1582. Expelled in Japan in 1614. Studied at Letran then entered the Dominican Order in 1624.	
Saint Francisco Shoyemon, O.P.	(no year indicated)	One of the 16 Martyrs of Japan.	

==== Servants of God ====
Name	Year/degree	Notability	Reference
José María de Manila, O.F.M.Cap.	A.B. 1892-1894	Born Eugenio Saz-Orozco in Manila to Spanish parents. One of the martyrs of the Spanish Civil War. Beatified by Pope Francis.	
Juan Bautista Fung de Santa Maria, O.P.	(no year indicated)	Chinese Dominican friar. Entered Letran in 1736. Martyred in 1755.	
Alfredo Versoza	A.B.	First Filipino bishop of Lipa, Batangas. Co-founded the Congregation of the Missionary Catechists of the Sacred Heart (MCSH). Declared Servant of God by Pope Benedict XVI.	

==== Men of Cloth ====
Name	Year/degree	Notability	Reference
Teodoro Bacani	H.S. 1956	Bishop Emeritus of Novaliches	
Artemio Casas	H.S. 1930	Rector of Manila Cathedral (1956–1962), Archbishop of Jaro, Iloilo (1974–1985)	
Oscar Cruz	G.S. 1943	Archbishop-Emeritus of Lingayen–Dagupan	
Clarence Victor Marquez	H.S. 1985	81st rector and president of Colegio de San Juan de Letran Manila (2015–2023)	
Sonny Ramirez	H.S. 1963, B.S.Psych. 1967	known for his sermons in “Siete Palabras,” the traditional Good Friday live broadcast reflection on the Seven Last Words of Jesus Christ; one of the founders of Oasis of Love Charismatic Community	
Jose Salazar	H.S. 1958	Auxiliary Bishop of Batanes	
Rufino Sescon Jr.	G.S. 1984, H.S. 1988	Bishop of Balanga, Bataan	
Socrates Villegas	H.S. 1977	Archbishop of Lingayen–Dagupan	

== National Heroes ==
=== Heroes of the Philippine Revolution ===
Name	Year/degree	Notability	Reference
Pedro Abad Santos	A.B.	Physician and lawyer, founder of Socialist Party of the Philippines, anti-Japanese guerrilla in World War II.	
Gregorio Aglipay	A.B. 1879 (transferred to University of Santo Tomas)	Military Vicar General of the Revolutionary Government of the Philippines, Lieutenant general during the Philippine–American War, and First Supreme Bishop (Obispo Maximo) of the Iglesia Filipina Independiente.	
Crispulo Aguinaldo	A.B.	Lieutenant general in the Katipunan. Older brother of Emilio Aguinaldo. Killed in the Battle of Pasong Santol.	
Santiago Alvarez	A.B.	Revolutionary general in the Katipunan from Imus, Cavite. Son of Mariano Alvarez.	
Servillano Aquino	A.B., land surveying	Revolutionary general in the Katipunan and the Philippine–American War. Grandfather of Benigno “Ninoy” Aquino Jr.	
Vito Belarmino	A.B. (did not finished)	Revolutionary general in the Katipunan and the Philippine–American War.	
Higinio Benitez	A.B.	Filipino lawyer and judge who represented the province of Laguna in the Malolos Congress. Father of Conrado Benitez, one of the drafters of the 1935 Constitution of the Philippines.	
José Burgos	A.B., Phil. 1855	One of the Gomburza martyrs who were falsely accused of mutiny in Cavite by the Spanish colonial authorities	
Graciano Cordero	(no year indicated)	Filipino physician who represented the province of Laguna in the Malolos Congress.	
Gregorio Crisostomo	A.B.	Filipino priest who is a member of the Katipunan. Represented the province of Bulacan at the Malolos Congress. Nephew of Marcelo H. Del Pilar.	
Mariano Crisostomo	A.B.	Filipino lawyer who is a member of the Katipunan. Younger brother of Gregorio Crisostomo. Represented the province of Bulacan at the Malolos Congress. Nephew of Marcelo H. Del Pilar.	
Marcelo H. Del Pilar	A.B.	Journalist, satirist, and one of the leading Ilustrado propagandist and revolutionary leader of the Philippine Revolution.	
Ladislao Diwa	A.B.	Founding member of the Katipunan.	
Edilberto Evangelista	A.B.	Engineer and Katipunan lieutenant general	
Leandro L. Fullon	A.B. (did not finish)	Revolutionary general in the Katipunan from Hamtic, Antique. First Filipino governor of Antique (1901–1904).	
Máximo Gregorio	(no year indicated)	Drafted into the Spanish colonial army while studying at Letran. Joined the Katipunan in 1892. One of the Thirteen Martyrs of Cavite.	
Emilio Jacinto	A.B.	One of the highest-ranking military officers in the Philippine Revolution and known as the "brains of the Katipunan." Author of the Kartilya ng Katipunan.	
Pedro Tongio Liongson	A.B. 1886	Member of the Malolos Congress from Bohol 1898–1899, First Director of Military Justice in the Republic's army during the Philippine–American War	
Mariano Llanera	A.B. (did not finish)	Revolutionary general in the Katipunan from Cabiao, Nueva Ecija. One of the instigators of Cry of Nueva Ecija.	
Honorio Lopez	A.B.	Filipino playwright and lieutenant colonel in the Katipunan. Wrote the book "Dimasalang Kalendariong Tagalog."	
Victoriano Luciano	A.B.	Filipino pharmacist, freemason, and member of the Katipunan. One of the Thirteen Martyrs of Cavite.	
Vicente Lukbán	LL.B.	Revolutionary general in the Katipunan from Lucban, Tayabas. Governor of Tayabas province (1912–1916).	
Apolinario Mabini	A.B. 1887 (granted the title "Profesor de Latín")	Filipino revolutionary leader, educator, lawyer, and statesman who served first as a legal and constitutional adviser to the Revolutionary Government, and then as the first prime minister of the Philippines upon the establishment of the First Philippine Republic.	
Mamerto Natividad	A.B. (did not finish)	Filipino haciendero and revolutionary general who established the army headquarters of the revolution at Biak-na-Bato.	
Pedro Pelaez	A.B. 1829	Father of Secularization Movement in the Philippines	
Artemio Ricarte	A.B.	Filipino general during the Philippine Revolution and the Philippine–American War. The first Chief of Staff of the Armed Forces of the Philippines.	
Pablo Tecson	A.B.	Revolutionary officer serving under Gen. Gregorio del Pilar. Governor of Bulacan, 1902–1906	
Pio Valenzuela	A.B.	Filipino physician and one of the high-ranked officers of the Katipunan.	
Isidoro Torres	A.B.	Filipino general during the Philippine Revolution and the Philippine–American War. Known as "Matanglawin" (Hawk-eyed) of the Katipunan.	
Flaviano Yengko	A.B.	Filipino general during the Philippine Revolution. Died at the Battle of Pasong Santol.	
Jacinto Zamora	A.B.	One of the Gomburza martyrs who were falsely accused of mutiny in Cavite by the Spanish colonial authorities.	

== Government ==
=== Presidents of the Philippines ===
Name	Year/degree	Notability	Reference
Emilio Aguinaldo	A.B. 1880-1882 (did not finish)	Philippine revolutionary leader. President of the First Philippine Republic (1899–1901)	
Jose P. Laurel	A.B. 1903-1904 (transferred to Manila High School)	Third president of the Philippines, president of the Second Republic (1943–1945)	
Sergio Osmeña	A.B. 1894	Second president of the Commonwealth of the Philippines, and fourth president of the Philippines (1944–1946)	
Manuel L. Quezon	A.B. 1894	First president of the Commonwealth of the Philippines, and second president of the Philippines (1935–1944)	

=== Vice Presidents of the Philippines ===
Name	Year/degree	Notability	Reference
Mariano Trias	A.B.	First de facto Philippine Vice President of the revolutionary government established at the Tejeros Convention	
Fernando Lopez	H.S. 1921	Third and seventh vice president of the Philippines	

=== Chief Justices ===
Name	Year/degree	Notability	Reference
Manuel Araullo	B.Phil.	Chief Justice of the Supreme Court of the Philippines, 1921–1924	
Cayetano Arellano	A.B.	Chief Justice of the Supreme Court of the Philippines, 1901–1920	
Ramón Avanceña	A.B.	Chief Justice of the Supreme Court of the Philippines, 1925–1941	
Victorino Mapa	A.B.	Chief Justice of the Supreme Court of the Philippines, 1920–1921	
Andres Narvasa	G.S. 1938	Chief Justice of the Supreme Court of the Philippines, 1991–1998	
Diosdado Peralta	B.S. Econ. 1974	Chief Justice of the Supreme Court of the Philippines, 2019–2021	

=== Senators of the Philippines ===
Name	Year/degree	Notability	Reference
Nicolas Capistrano	A.B., S.T.B. (transferred to University of Santo Tomas)	Senator of the Philippines from the 11th District (1916–1919)	
Francis Afan Delgado	A.B.	Senator of the Philippines 1951–1957	
Isabelo de los Reyes	A.B.	Senator of the Philippines from the 1st district (1922–1928), founder/proclaimer of the Iglesia Filipina Independiente, labor activist	
Pedro Guevara	A.B. 1896	Senator of the Philippines from the 4th district (1916–1923)	
Richard Gordon	G.S. 1955	Senator of the Philippines 2004–2010, 2016–2022; Philippine Red Cross chairman 2004-present	
Francisco Tongio Liongson	A.B. 1887	Senator of the Philippines from the 3rd district (1916–1919)	
Vicente Madrigal	A.B. 1894	Senator of the Philippines 1945–1953, grandfather of Senator Jamby Madrigal	
Enrique Magalona	A.B. 1907, LL.B. 1911	Senator of the Philippines 1946–1955, grandfather of Francis Magalona	
Eugolio Rodriguez	A.B. 1896	Seventh and tenth Senate President of the Philippines 1954–1963	
Quintin Paredes	A.B.	Fifth Senate President of the Philippines, 1952	
Esteban Singson	A.B. 1903	Senator of the Philippines from the 9th District 1916–1922	
Vicente Y. Sotto	A.B.	Senator of the Philippines 1946–1950	
Tito Sotto	G.S., H.S. 1965, A.B. English 1970	Twenty-ninth and Thirty-second Senate President of the Philippines (2018–22, 2025-2026), TV host, actor; bronze medalist (bowling), 1978 Asian Games.	
Freddie Webb	A.B. English	Senator of the Philippines 1992–1998, TV host, actor, radio personality, basketball head coach; member, Philippines' national basketball team in the 1972 Summer Olympics; member, 1960 NCAA Philippines championship team	

=== Congressmen of the Philippines ===
Name	Year/degree	Notability	Reference
Benigno Aquino Sr.	A.B. 1907	Speaker of the National Assembly of the Second Philippine Republic. Father of Senator Ninoy Aquino. Grandfather of President Noynoy Aquino	
Sergio Apostol	Associate in Arts 1954	Member of the Philippine House of Representatives from Leyte's 2nd congressional district 1992–2001, 2010–2016	
Teodoro Kalaw	G.S.	Filipino scholar, legislator, and historian in Spanish language. Member of the Philippine Assembly from Batangas's 3rd district 1909–1912	
Gus Tambunting	G.S. 1976, H.S. 1980, B.S.B.A. in Mktg. Mgmt. 1984	Member of the Philippine House of Representatives from Parañaque's 2nd District 2013–2019, 2022–2025	

=== Other government officials ===
Name	Year/degree	Notability	Reference
Felipe Agoncillo	A.B. 1875	First Filipino diplomat who represented the First Philippine Republic in the United States and Europe	
Herminio Astorga	H.S. 1951	Seventeenth Vice Mayor of Manila 1962–1967; member, 1950 NCAA Philippines men's basketball championship team	
Jaime Bautista	B.S.Comm.1977	Secretary of Department of Transportation, 2022–2025; Philippine Airlines president, 2004–2012	
Greco Belgica	H.S. 1965	Manila city councilor 2004–2007; Chairman of the Presidential Anti-Corruption Commission, 2021	
Jaime C. de Veyra	A.B. 1892	Resident Commissioner to the U.S. House of Representatives from the Philippine Islands, 1917–1923; former Director of the Institute of National Language, 1937–1944	
Rafael del Pan	A.B. 1880	Solicitor General of the Philippine Islands 1891–1893; first Filipino criminologist; translated Jose Rizal's poem "Mi último adiós" into English	
Tobias Enverga	A.B.Econ. 1976	Senator for Ontario, Canada 2012–2017	
Leon Guinto Sr.	A.B.	Twelfth Mayor of Manila 1942–1944	
Salvador Medialdea	B.S.Comm. 1972	Executive Secretary of the Philippines, 2016–2022	
Pablo Ocampo	A.B.	Resident Commissioner to the U.S. House of Representatives from the Philippine Islands, 1907–1909; Fourth Vice Mayor of Manila, 1915–1920	
Bernardo Pardo	H.S. 1950	Commission on Elections chairman 1995–1998	
Gregorio Perfecto	A.B.	Associate Justice of the Supreme Court of the Philippines 1945–1949	
Strike Revilla	B.S.Comm. Mgmt. 1991, M.B.A.	Mayor of Bacoor, 2022-present; member of the Philippine House of Representatives from Cavite's 2nd district, 2016–2022; brother of Senator Bong Revilla Jr.	
Chavit Singson	B.S.Comm. 1961	Governor of Ilocos Sur (1972–1986, 1992–2001, 2004–2007, 2010–2013); founder and chairman, LCS Group of Companies	
Honorio Ventura	Pre-law	Secretary of the Interior, 1925–1933	

== Educators ==
Name	Year/degree	Notability	Reference
Virgilio Enriquez	H.S. 1957	Filipino psychologist. Considered as the Father of Filipino psychology. Founded the Pambansang Samahan sa Sikolohiyang Pilipino (National Association for Filipino Psychology). University of the Philippines Department of Psychology chairman, 1977-1982.	
Bienvenido Gonzalez	H.S.	Sixth President of the University of the Philippines	
Bonifacio Mencias	(no year indicated)	Filipino physician, epidemiologist, guerrilla sympathizer, dean of the University of Santo Tomas Faculty of Medicine 1936–1944	
Jose Maria Sison	H.S. 1956	Founding chairman, Communist Party of the Philippines; writer, University of the Philippines professor	
Ignacio Villamor	A.B. 1885, M.A. 1885	Second President of the University of the Philippines, father of decorated war veteran Jesús A. Villamor	

== Business ==
Name	Year/degree	Notability	Reference
Luis Abiva	G.S. 1954, H.S. 1958, B.S.Comm. 1963	Chairman, Abiva Publishing House Inc.	
Geronimo de los Reyes Jr.	B.S.Comm. Fin. and Mgmt.	Chairman Emeritus, Gateway Property Holdings, Inc.	
Panfilo Domingo	M.B.A. 2007	President, Philippine National Bank; chairman, University of the East	
Francisco Eizmendi Jr.	H.S. 1952	President, San Miguel Corporation	
Henry Lim Bon Liong	H.S. 1967	Chief executive officer, Sterling Paper Group of Companies	
Francisco B. Ortigas	A.B. 1889	Lawyer, Businessman. Patriarch of the Ortigas clan.	
Enrique Zóbel de Ayala	A.B. (transferred to Real Colegio Alfonso XII, Spain)	Managing partner of Ayala y Compañía (1901–1913, 1920–1943); patriarch of the Zóbel de Ayala family	

== Literature ==
Name	Year/degree	Notability	Reference
Francisco Balagtas	(no year indicated)	poet and writer best known for his magnum opus, Florante at Laura	
Jesús Balmori	A.B. 1900	renowned Filipino Poet in Spanish, Premio Zobel awardee (1926)	
Francisco Alonso Liongson	A.B. 1911	Playwright in the Golden Age of Philippine literature in Spanish, son of Senator Francisco Tongio Liongson	
Bienvenido Lumbera	H.S. 1950	National Artist of the Philippines; Recipient of the Ramon Magsaysay Award for Journalism, Literature and Creative communication; Carlos Palanca Memorial Awardee	
Antonio Molina	A.B. 1909	composer, conductor, pedagogue, historian, and music administrator, Premio Zobel awardee (1985)	
Jesus Peralta	H.S. 1951, Assoc. in Arts 1953	painter, photographer, poet, anthropologist, archaeologist, essayist; Hall of Famer Carlos Palanca Memorial Awards in Literature	
José María Panganiban	A.B. 1883, agriculture 1885	Filipino propagandist, linguist, and essayist. One of the main writers and contributors for La Solidaridad, writing under the pen names "Jomapa" and "J.M.P."	
Mariano Ponce	A.B. 1885	One of the founders of La Solidaridad and Asociación Hispano-Filipino in Spain.	
Severino Reyes	A.B.	Writer, dramatist, and playwright. Author of "Walang Sugat" and "Mga Kwento ni Lola Basyang."	
Guillermo Gómez Rivera	A.B. 1967	Writer, Premio Zobel awardee (1975)	
Rolando Tinio	H.S. 1950, Assoc. in Arts 1952	National Artist of the Philippines for Theater and Literature	

== Media ==
Name	Year/degree	Notability	Reference
Dante Arevalo Ang	M.B.A. 2003	Journalist, Chairman Emeritus of The Manila Times.	
Mark Averilla	A.B.Com. Arts 2013	Television host, actor, educator, content creator known as Macoy Dubs and Auntie Julie	
Joynilou Babor	A.B.Com. Arts 2013	Radio host professionally known as DJ Lyka Barista	
Lloyd Cadena	B.S.B.A. Fin. Mgmt. 2014	YouTuber, vlogger, radio host, and author, content creator known as Kween LC	
Johnny Delgado	H.S. 1965	Actor, writer, comedian	
Maryo J. Delos Reyes	G.S. 1962	Film director	
Lourd De Veyra	H.S.	Poet, journalist, activist, television host; musician best known as the lead vocalist of Radioactive Sago Project band	
Laurenti Dyogi	H.S. 1983	Television executive, director, and producer; best known as the head executive of ABS-CBN's Star Magic and executive producer of Pinoy Big Brother	
Ted Failon	A.B. Econ. (did not finish)	Broadcast journalist, radio host, politician	
Eddie Gutierrez	B.S.Comm.	Actor	
Juancho Gutierrez		Actor	
Raymond Lauchengco	G.S. 1978, H.S. 1982	Actor, singer	
Rebecca Lusterio	A.B.Com. Arts 2010	Actress known for her roles in Muro-Ami and Panaghoy sa Suba. FAMAS and Metro Manila Film Festival awardee	
German Moreno	H.S. 1949 (did not finish)	Widely known as Kuya Germs and The Master Showman. Actor, host, comedian, and talent manager.	
Wendell Ramos	H.S. (transferred to St. Mary's Academy Quezon City)	Actor	
JP Soriano	A.B.Com. Arts 2003	Reporter and producer, best known for his works on GMA Integrated News	
Val Sotto	H.S. 1968	Actor, singer, composer, comedian. One of the lead vocalists of Filipino disco band VST & Company. Brother of Senator Tito Sotto.	
Vic Sotto	Pre., G.S. 1967, H.S. 1971	Actor, singer, composer, comedian; television host, best known for his works on Eat Bulaga. One of the lead vocalists of Filipino disco band VST & Company. Brother of Senator Tito Sotto.	
Emil Sumangil	A.B.Com. Arts 1999	Broadcast journalist and news anchor for GMA Integrated News, best known for hosting investigative reports such as 24 Oras and Resibo: Walang Lusot ang May Atraso	
Ramon Tulfo	G.S. 1960	Radio broadcaster, television host, newspaper journalist	
Ariel Villasanta	B.S.B.A.	Television host and comedian, one-half of the comedy duo Ariel and Maverick with Maverick Relova	

== Sportspeople ==
=== Basketball ===
Name	Year/degree	Notability	Reference
Kevin Alas	H.S. 2009, B.S.I.T. 2016	Philippine men's national basketball team multi-medalist (2013, 2014, 2022); PBA champion (2015); NCAA Philippines Mythical 5 member (2011, 2012)	
Aldin Ayo		NCAA Philippines champion (as a player - 1998,1999; as head coach - 2015); UAAP champion (as head coach - 2016)	
Mark Andaya		NCAA Philippines champion (2005); ABL champion (2010); actor	
Raymond Almazan		member, Philippine men's national basketball team (2017, 2019); 2017 SEABA gold medalist; PBA champion (2016, 2024); NCAA Philippines MVP (2013); NCAA Philippines Mythical 5 member (2011, 2013)	
Chris Calaguio		2001 SEA Games men's basketball gold medalist; PBA champion (2009); MBA champion (2000); NCAA Philippines MVP (1998); NCAA Philippines champion (1998)	
Alfrancis Chua	H.S. 1985	PBA head coach; team manager and executive, Barangay Ginebra San Miguel	
Felicisimo Fajardo	B.S.Comm. (transferred to University of Santo Tomas)	1948 Olympian; ABC Championship mutli-medalist (1963, 1965)	
Andy Gemao	H.S. 2022-2023 (transferred to Veritas Academy National Prep, USA)	NCAA Philippines juniors basketball champion, Finals MVP (2023); NBTC high school basketball rank #4 (2023); currently committed to play for Penn State Nittany Lions	
Yeng Guiao	G.S.	Philippine men's national basketball team head coach, PBA head coach, politician	
Rudy Hines		MICAA MVP (1975); member, Philippine men's national basketball team (1975); PBA referee; NCAA champion (as a player - 1970; as head coach - 1992)	
RJ Jazul	H.S., B.S.I.T. 2010	PBA champion (2013); NCAA Philippines champion (2005)	
Samboy Lim		Philippine men's national basketball team multi-medalist (SEA Games - 1983, 1985; Asian Games - 1986, 1990; Asia Club - 1984; ABC Championship - 1985); 50 Greatest Players in PBA History selection, PBA Hall of Fame Class of 2009, 9× PBA champion, NCAA Philippines champion (1982, 1983, 1984), NCAA Philippines MVP (1984)	
Julian Malonso	H.S.	Philippine Olympic Committee president	
Willie Miller		50 Greatest Players in PBA History selection, 4× PBA Champion, PBA MVP (2002, 2007); NCAA Philippines Rookie of the Year (1995)	
Lauro Mumar		Philippine men's national basketball team multi-medalist (ABC Championship - 1969; Asian Games - 1951, 1954; FIBA World Championship - 1954); MICAA champion (1950); NCAA Philippines champion (1950)	
Rey Nambatac	H.S. 2013, B.S.B.A. Mktg.Mgmt. 2018	SEABA Under-18 gold medalist (2012); PBA champion (2024, 2025); PBA Finals MVP (2024); NCAA Philippines champion (2015)	
Tonichi Pujante		Vietnam Basketball Association commissioner; NCAA Philippines champion (1982, 1983, 1984); NCAA Philippines commissioner; UAAP commissioner	
Kerby Raymundo		50 Greatest Players in PBA History selection, 1999 SEA Games gold medalist; 4x PBA champion; NCAA Philippines MVP (1999); NCAA Philippines champion (1998, 1999)	
Terry Saldaña	H.S.	6× PBA champion; PBA Most Improved Player (1983); NCAA Philippines juniors champion (1979)	
Nemie Villegas		PBA head coach; NCAA Philippines champion (as a player - 1966; as head coach - 1979)	
Fran Yu		SEABA Under-18 gold medalist (2016); NCAA Philippines champion (2019, 2021, 2022); NCAA Philippines Finals MVP (2019)	

=== Other Sports ===
Name	Year/degree	Notability	Reference
Ramil Abratique		member, Philippine taekwondo team; 1990 Asian Games bronze medalist, 1991 10th World Taekwondo Championships silver medalist, 1991 SEA Games gold medalist, 1993 SEA Games bronze medalist	
Archand Christian Bagsit		multi-medalist athlete in SEA Games track and field	
Sambiao Basanung		Two-time Olympic swimmer (1948, 1952); 1938 Letran Knights swimming team captain	
Enrique Beech		Two-time Olympic trap shooter (1956, 1960); football player	
Mayeth Carolino		member, 2006 Philippines women's national volleyball team, NCAA Philippines women's volleyball champion (as a player - 1998–1999; as head coach - 2026), sister of Michelle Carolino	
Michelle Carolino		member, 2006 Philippines women's national volleyball team, NCAA Philippines women's volleyball champion (1998-1999), sister of Mayeth Carolino	
Tony Chua	H.S. 1971, B.S.B.A. 1975	vice-president, Philippine Football Federation; team manager, Red Bull Barako	
Oliver Ongtawco		gold medalist, FIQ WTBA World Tenpin Bowling Championships (1979)	
Carlos Padilla Sr.	H.S.	One-time Olympic boxer (1932); father of boxing referee Sonny Padilla and grandfather of actress Zsa Zsa Padilla	
Jose Padilla Jr.	H.S.	Two-time Olympic boxer (1932, 1936); actor; brother of Carlos Padilla Sr.	
Fausto Preysler	H.S.	Two-time Olympic racing sailor (1960, 1964)	
