= Liang (surname) =

Liáng (梁)
- The Chinese character for Liang
- Pronunciation: Liáng (Mandarin Pinyin); Loeng4 (Cantonese Jyutping)

Origin
- Meaning: From the State of Liang, Liang dynasty, beam, bridge, ridge

Other names
- Variant forms: Leung, Leong, Lyang, Lio, Leon

Transliteration	Regions
Liang	China, Indonesia, Malaysia, Taiwan
Leung	Hong Kong
Leong	Hong Kong, Macau, Malaysia, Singapore
Liong	Indonesia, Fuzhou
Neo/Lio/Lyo/Leo	Hokkien, Teochew, Hainan
Yang (양) / Ryang (량)	Korea
Lương	Vietnam
Leang	Cambodia
Diang/Diam/Leong/Liong/Niu	Philippines
Leon	Guatemala, Nicaragua

Liang (Chinese: 梁) is an East Asian surname of Chinese origin. The surname is often transliterated as Leung (in Hong Kong) or Leong (in Macau, Hong Kong, Malaysia, Singapore, and the Philippines) according to its Cantonese and Hakka pronunciation, Neo / Lio / Niu (Hokkien, Teochew, Hainan), or Liong (Fuzhou). In Indonesia, it is known as Liong or Nio. It is also common in Korea, where it is written Yang (양) or Ryang (량). In Vietnam, it is pronounced as Lương.

It is listed 128th in the classic text Hundred Family Surnames. In 2019 it was the 22nd most common surname in mainland China. In comparison, it is the 7th most common surname in Hong Kong, where it is usually written Leung or Leong.

== History ==
During the reign of the Zhou dynasty King Xuan of Zhou (827–782 BC), Qin Zhong set out on an expedition to subdue the peoples to the west in Central Asia. After Qin Zhong died, the King divided the area of Shang among them, the second son of Qin Zhong received the area around Liangshan County, from which his descendants developed the surname Liang.

== Notable people with the surname Liang ==
=== Liang ===
- Awonder Liang (born 2003), American chess Grandmaster
- Liang Chen, Chinese professional tennis player
- Liang Cheng, Qing dynasty ambassador to the United States
- Christine Liang, Taiwanese-born president and founder of ASI Corp., Fremont, California
- Edwaard Liang, Taiwanese-born American choreographer, ballet dancer
- Liang Guanglie, Minister of National Defense in the People's Republic of China and serves as a general in the People's Liberation Army of China
- Liang Heng, Chinese ex-pat writer and scholar
- Jingjing Liang, Chinese forest ecologist and academic
- Lawrence Liang, Indian legal researcher and lawyer
- Lei Liang, Chinese-born American composer
- Matt Liang, Canadian politician
- Matthew H. Liang, American physician scientist
- Liang May Seen, first Chinese woman to live in Minnesota, community leader in Minneapolis
- Liang Qichao, Chinese scholar, philosopher, journalist and reformist
- Ronnie Liang, Filipino singer
- Roseanne Liang, Chinese-New Zealand film director
- Sandy Liang, American fashion designer
- Liang Shih-Chiu (1903–1987), Chinese educator, writer, translator, literary theorist and lexicographer
- Liang Weicong, Chinese para-cyclist
- Liang Wenbo, snooker player
- Liang Wenfeng, founder of Deepseek
- Liang Wengen, founder and main shareholder of Sany Group, one of the wealthiest men in China
- Liang Xiaosheng, Chinese novelist and screenwriter
- Liang Xueming, Chinese footballer
- Liang Xueqing, Chinese painter, magazine editor
- Liang Yongqi (born 1997), Chinese actor

=== Leung ===
- Katie Leung, British film, television and stage actress
- Ken Leung, American film and television actor
- Martin Leung, American pianist
- Toby Leung, Hong Kong television actress
- Tony Leung (Leung Chiu Wai), Hong Kong actor and singer
- Tony Leung Ka-fai, Hong Kong actor
- Stephen Leung, Chinese-Canadian bishop of the Anglican Network in Canada
- Lawrence Leung, Australian comedian, writer and director
- Jade Leung (engineer), researcher and engineer working in the United Kingdom
- Leung Jan, Wing Chun practitioner and Chinese herbal doctor from Foshan
- Leung Kwok-hung, Hong Kong activist, politician and Member of the Legislative Council of Hong Kong
- Steve Leung, architect, interior and product designer, and restaurateur born in Hong Kong
- Elsie Leung, solicitor and former Secretary for Justice of Hong Kong
- Gigi Leung, Hong Kong Cantopop singer and actress
- CY Leung, third Chief Executive of the Hong Kong Special Administrative Region
- Edmond Leung (梁漢文), Hong Kong singer, actor, a quarter of Big Four and a finalist of the 8th annual New Talent Singing Awards
- Andrew Leung, President of the Legislative Council of Hong Kong
- Antony Leung, banker and former Financial Secretary of Hong Kong
- Bryan Leung, Hong Kong martial arts actor and director

=== Leong ===
- Elyn Leong, Malaysian social media influencer and member of multi-national girl group Gen1es
- Fish Leong, Malaysian-born Mandopop singer
- Kerson Leong, Canadian violinist
- Alan Leong (梁家傑), Senior Counsel and former member of the Legislative Council of Hong Kong
- Edwin Leong, Hong Kong billionaire businessman
- Isabella Leong, Hong Kong–based Macanese actress and former singer
- Leong Mun Wai (梁文辉), Singaporean company director and politician

=== Neo/Nio ===
- Jack Neo (梁智強), film director
- Lily Neo (full name Lily Tirtasana Neo), former Singapore doctor and politician
- Neo Ao Tiew, businessman, philanthropist and sheriff
- Neo Beng Siang, professional basketball coach from Singapore
- Nio Joe Lan, Indonesian historian
- Muhammad Syafii Antonio (Nio Gwan Chung), Indonesian professor and Islamic economist
- David Neo (梁振伟), Singaporean army chief and politician
- Zermatt Neo, Singaporean competitive eater

=== Lương ===
- Lương Thế Vinh, Vietnamese scholar and mathematician
- Lương Kim Định (1914–1997), Vietnamese catholic priest, scholar and philosopher
- Lương Bích Hữu, Vietnamese singer

=== Liongson ===
- Francisco Tongio Liongson, Early Filipino politician
- Pedro Tongio Liongson, Early Filipino politician
- Francisco Alonso Liongson, Filipino playwright

== See also ==
- Yang (Korean surname), notable Korean people with the last name Yang.
