= Liongson =

Liongson is a Filipino surname that may refer to the following notable people:

- Francisco Alonso Liongson (1896–1965), Filipino writer, son of Francisco Tongio
- Francisco Tongio Liongson (1869–1919), Filipino doctor and politician
- Pedro Tongio Liongson (1865–1932), Filipino lawyer and politician
