= Yang (Korean surname) =

- Hangul: 양
- Hanja: 楊, 梁, 樑, 襄
- RR: Yang
- MR: Yang

Yang (Korean: 양) is a Korean surname. According to the 2000 South Korean Census, 486,645 people in South Korea had the surname Yang.

== Overview ==
The family name Yang can be written with four different hanja, indicating different lineages. The 2000 South Korean Census found a total of 486,645 people in 151,315 households with these family names.

=== Hanja meaning "bridge" (梁 or 樑) ===
Deulbo Yang (들보 양, 梁), meaning "bridge", is by far the most common of the four surname hanja read Yang, used by 389,152 people in 120,534 households. This made it the 25th-most common surname among the 288 surnames distinguished by the 2000 Census. Additionally, another 3,254 people in 960 households used the variant form (樑, with a "tree" radical added on the left); that variant alone was the 144th-most common surname. They identified with 32 different bon-gwan (hometown of a clan lineage, not necessarily the actual residence of clan members):

- Namwon, North Jeolla: 218,546 people in 67,691 households. They claim descent from Yang U-ryang (梁友諒), a descendant of the Jeju Yang clan's ancestor Yang Eul-na who came to Namwon during the reign of Gyeongdeok of Silla.
- Jeju: 133,355 people in 41,169 households. They claim descent from Yang Eul-na (梁乙那) of the Tamna kingdom in modern-day Jeju, whose surname was originally another character (良). Yang Sun (梁洵), a descendant of Yang Eul-na, then came to Silla in the mainland of Korea during the reign of King Sinmun, and the Namwon and Cheongju clans later branched off from the Jeju clan.
- Namyang (today Hwaseong, Gyeonggi): 7,280 people in 2,173 households. Additionally, this was the bon-gwan reported by nearly all (3,211 people in 957 households) of the people who used the variant form 樑; two others reported a different bon-gwan, while the other 41 did not report a bon-gwan at all.
- Cheongju, North Chungcheong: 8,499 people in 2,649 households.
- Gyeongju, North Gyeongsang: 6,274 people in 1,990 households.
- Other or unreported bon-gwan: 15,171 people in 4,862 households.

=== Hanja meaning "willow" (楊) ===
Beodeul Yang (버들 양, 楊), meaning "willow", is the second-most common of the four surname hanja read Yang, used by 93,416 people in 29,558 households. This made it the 55th-most common surname in the 2000 Census.

=== Hanja meaning "assist" (襄) ===
Doul Yang (도울 양, 襄), meaning "assist", is the least common of the four surname hanja read Yang, used by 823 people in 263 households. This made it the 182nd-most common surname in the 2000 Census. The census did not report the bon-gwan for this surname.

== Notable people with the surname ==
=== Academic ===
- Yang Ji-won (engineer) (born 1949), South Korean professor of chemical and bio-molecular engineering at KAIST

=== Entertainment/film ===
- Yang Byung-yeol (born 1993), South Korean actor
- Yang Dong-geun (born 1979), South Korean actor, rapper, singer-songwriter, record producer and breakdancer
- Yang Hee-kyung (born 1954), South Korean actress
- Yang Hye-ji (born 1996), South Korean actress
- Yang Ik-june (born 1975), South Korean actor and director
- Yang Jin-sung (born 1988), South Korean actress
- Yang Jung-a (born 1971), South Korean actress
- Yang Mi-kyung (born 1961), South Korean actress
- Shin Min-a (born Yang Min-a, 1984), South Korean actress and model
- Yang Se-jong (born 1992), South Korean model and actor
- Yang Seung-pil (born 1992), South Korean actor
- Yang Soobin (born 1994), South Korean mukbang entertainer
- Yang Yong-hi (born 1964), Japanese-born Korean film director
- Yang Yun-ho (born 1966), South Korean film director and screenwriter
- Yang Se-hyung (born 1985), South Korean comedian and entertainer
- Yang Se-chan (born 1986), South Korean comedian
- Eugene Lee Yang (born 1986), South Korean American actor, producer, author, director, activist and internet celebrity

=== Literature ===
- Yang Gui-ja (born 1955), South Korean writer

=== Military ===
- Yang Chil-seong (1919–1949), Indonesian freedom fighter of Korean descent known as Komarudin
- Yang Kyu, 11th century Goryeo general who fought the Khitans
- Yang Kyoungjong (1920–1992), Korean soldier who fought for the Imperial Japanese Army, the Red Army, and the German Wehrmacht during World War II
- Yang Sung-sook, South Korean general

=== Music ===
- Yang Bang-ean (born 1960), Tokyo-born Korean composer, arranger, record producer, and pianist
- Yang Da-il (born 1992), South Korean singer
- Yang Hee-eun (born 1952), South Korean singer and songwriter
- Yang Hong-seok (born 1994), South Korean singer, member of boy group Pentagon
- Yang Hyun-suk (born 1970), South Korean music executive, founder and CEO of YG Entertainment
- Yang Ji-won (born 1988), South Korean singer and actress, former member of girl groups Spica and Uni.T
- Yang Joon-il (born 1969), Korean-American singer-songwriter
- Jungwon (born Yang Jungwon, 2004), South Korean singer, member of boy band ENHYPEN
- Yang Jung-yoon (stage name Jiyul, born 1991), South Korean singer and actress, member of girl group Dal Shabet
- Yang Seung-ho (born 1987), South Korean singer, leader of boy group MBLAQ
- Sung-Won Yang, South Korean cellist, professor of cello at the Yonsei University School of Music
- Yang Yeon-je (born 1999), South Korean singer, former member of girl group Alice
- Yang Yo-seob (born 1990), South Korean singer, member of boy group Highlight
- Yang Jeong-in (stage name I.N, born 2001), South Korean singer, member of boy group Stray Kids

=== Politics ===
- Yang Gi-tak (1871–1938), Korean independence activist, 9th president of the Provisional Government of the Republic of Korea
- Yang Sung-chul (born 1939), South Korean diplomat who served as Seoul's ambassador to the U.S. from 2000 to 2003

=== Sports ===
- Yang Dong-geun (born 1981), South Korean retired basketball player
- Yang Dongi (born 1984), South Korean mixed martial artist
- Yang Hak-seon (born 1992), South Korean gymnast, country's first Olympic gold medalist in gymnastics
- Yang Hee-jong (born 1984), South Korean basketball player, national team member
- Yang Hong-seok (born 1997), South Korean basketball player, national team member
- Yang Hui-tae (born 1968), South Korean wheelchair curler
- Yang Joon-hyuk (born 1969), South Korean retired baseball outfielder
- Yang Hyeon-jong (born 1988), South Korean professional baseball pitcher
- Yang Jung-mo (born 1953), South Korean retired freestyle wrestler and the country's first Olympic gold medalist
- Yang Min-hyeok (born 2006), South Korean footballer
- Yang Shin-young (born 1990), South Korean short-track and long-track speed skater
- Yang Tae-hwa (born 1982), South Korean retired ice dancer, national champion from 1999 to 2002
- Yang Tae-young (born 1980), South Korean 2004 Olympic bronze medalist in the individual all-around event in artistic gymnastics
- Yang Yong-eun (born 1972), South Korean professional golfer and winner of 2009 PGA Championship
- Yang Young-ja (born 1964), South Korean professional table tennis player who won gold at the 1988 Olympics

=== Visual arts/fashion ===
- Niki Yang (born 1985), South Korean animator, writer, storyboard artist, and voice actress

== Fictional characters ==
- Cristina Yang: fictional character on Grey's Anatomy played by Sandra Oh
- Suzanne "Z" Yang: American Girl character

== See also ==
- Jeju Province
- Liang (surname)
- List of Korean Americans
- List of Korean family names
- Yang (surname)
