= Genoveva Matute =

Filipino author

Genoveva Edroza-Matute
- Born: Genoveva Dizon Edroza; January 3, 1915; Santa Cruz, Manila, Philippines
- Died: March 21, 2009 (aged 94); Cubao, Philippines
- Other name: Aling Bebang
- Occupation: Writer
- Spouse: Epifanio Matute
- Writing career
- Genre: Short story

Genoveva Dizon Edroza-Matute (January 3, 1915 – March 21, 2009) was a Filipino author. In 1951, she was the recipient of the first ever Palanca Award for Short Story in Filipino, for "Kuwento ni Mabuti", which has been cited as the most anthologized Tagalog language short story.

== Early life ==
She was born in Santa Cruz, Manila on January 3, 1915, to Anastacio Edroza and Maria Magdalena Dizon. Matute is the creator of the popular radio program and television series, "The Story of the Boys", in the 50s.

== Educational life ==
She studied at Manila North High School (now Arellano High School), Philippine Normal School, (now Philippine Normal University), and the University of Santo Tomas (where she obtained her PhD in 1964). She taught for 46 years at Cecilio Apostol Elementary School and Arellano High School, and served as chair of the Philippine Department of then-Philippine Normal College.

== Career ==
Some of her short stories are "Leave-taking" and "Land of the Bitter", published in the Manila Post Sunday Magazine and in the monthly Manila Post. But she was most intrigued by her ideas examining the psychology and experiences in teaching, such as "Eight Years," "Noche Buena," "The Story of the Good", or Ang Kuwento ni Mabuti and "Sailing the Heart of a Child”. Her anthology published short stories and essays in "I Am a Voice" in 1952. Some of the following collections are in Selected Short Stories 1939–1992; In the Shadow of EDSA and Other Stories, and the Voice of Feelings. She also published with her husband in the Philippine Values in the Books: Stories, Essays, Games in 1992.

== Awards ==
Her writing and dedication to teaching were recognized in the Don Carlos Palanca Memorial Awards 1950s – 1960s; Outstanding PNS-PNC Alumna Award in 1966; Manila Arts and Culture Award in 1967; Balagtas National Student Award of the Philippine Writers' Union in 1988; and the CCP Award for the Arts in 1992.

== Death ==
She died at the age of 94 on March 21, 2009, while asleep. She was buried in Manila North Cemetery.

== Tribute ==
On January 3, 2020, Google celebrated her 105th birthday with a Google Doodle.
