= 1951 Palanca Awards =

Philippine literary award

1st Palanca Memorial Awards
- Date: September 1, 1951
- Location: Philippine Columbian Clubhouse, Paco, Manila, Philippines

The 1st Carlos Palanca Memorial Awards for Literature was held on September 1, 1951, at the Philippine Columbian Clubhouse in Paco, Manila, to commemorate the memory of Carlos T. Palanca Sr. through an endeavor that would promote education and culture in the country.

== English Division ==
=== Short Story ===
- First Prize: Juan T. Gatbonton, "Clay"
- Second Prize: Francisco Arcellana, "The Flowers of May"
- Third Prize: Edith L. Tiempo, "The Black Monkey"

== Filipino Division ==
=== Maikling Kwento ===
- First Prize: Genoveva Edroza Matute, "Kuwento ni Mabuti"
- Second Prize: Pedro S. Dandan, "Mabangis na Kamay, Maamong Kamay"
- Third Prize: Elpidio P. Kapulong, "Planeta, Buwan at mga Bituin"

== Sources ==
- "The Don Carlos Palanca Memorial Awards for Literature | Winners 1951". Archived from the original on 2009-10-22.
