= SL Agritech Corporation =

SL Agritech
- Type: Subsidiary
- Founded: 1998; 28 years ago
- Key people: Henry Lim Bon Liong (Chairman & CEO)
- Brands: Doña Maria Premium Quality Rice; Willy Farms Rice
- Parent: Sterling Paper Group of Companies
- Website: sl-agritech.com

SL Agritech Corporation (SLAC) is a research development and production of hybrid rice company in the Philippines.

== Background ==
It is a subsidiary company of Sterling Paper Group of Companies which was founded by Henry Lim Bon Liong in 1998.

From its former land provided by the government of Laguna, it is in the 40-hectare land in Barangay Oogong, Santa Cruz, Laguna, serving as its research and breeding complex. In April 2000, its first hybrid rice seeds were harvested (Mestizo A line and F1 Mestizo hybrid rice seeds). Its production led to an agreement between SLAC and the Department of Agriculture through the representation of PHILRICE. SLAC then established its first major seed production base at Banaybanay, Davao Oriental.

In August 2018, the International Rice Research Institute (IRRI) entered into a six-year Limited-Exclusive Commercial License Agreement with SL Agritech Corporation to scale up the production and distribution of two elite hybrid rice varieties (Mestiso 61 and Mestiso 68) in the Philippines. Under the agreement, royalties from seed sales are shared between IRRI, the Philippine Rice Research Institute (PhilRice), and the United Nations Food and Agriculture Organization's benefit-sharing fund.

== Affiliates ==
- SL Agrifoods Corporation
- SL Biotech Corporation
- Doña Maria Rice Surprise

== See also ==
- Henry Lim Bon Liong
