= Yang Ji-won (engineer) =

- Hangul: 양지원
- Hanja: 楊枝原
- RR: Yang Jiwon
- MR: Yang Chiwŏn

Yang Ji-won (born 1949) is a professor in Department of Chemical & Biomolecular Engineering at KAIST (Korea Advanced Institute of Science and Technology) and CEO of ABC (Advanced Biomass R&D Center), which is a key research institutes for biofuel and bio-refinery in South Korea.

He received B.S. from Seoul National University, and Ph.D. from Northwestern University. He joined KAIST as a faculty member in 1986 and his research area has covered a wide range of topics in environmental biotechnology. Dr. Yang has more than 200 publications and supervised 50 post-graduate students.

Recently, he served as a Vice-President for External Affairs of KAIST for 4 years. Since 2010, he serves as a CEO of ABC. ABC is currently striving for being a global leader in the biofuel and bio-refinery technology. Approximately 200 million US dollars will be funded by MEST(Ministry of Education, Science and Technology) for 9 years. More than 200 experts in a wide variety of research fields including biochemical engineering and molecular biology are employed or participated in ABC.

He is a recipient of various awards for significant contribution to the research innovations in environmental or microalgal biotechnology from the South Korean government or many academic societies. In addition, Dr. Yang showed various activities across many fields of academia, civil society, and government. Dr. Yang had served as the President of Korean Society of Biotechnology and Bioengineering, and the editor-in-chief for the Korean Journal of Soil and Groundwater. He also served as a judge of national R&D projects for South Korean government and an active member in environmental NGOs, appointed as a co-chairman of the Green Consumer Network and the chairman of the Daejeon Green Growth Forum. With these experiences, he is working to build an international ecocity coalition committed to the sustainable development.
