= Sterling Paper Group of Companies =

Manufacturer in the Philippines

Sterling Paper
- Company type: Private
- Founder: Lim Seh Leng
- Key people: Henry Lim Bon Liong (Chairman & CEO)
- Products: School supplies, office supplies, rice
- Subsidiaries: SL Agritech Corporation
- Website: www.sterlingpaper.com

Sterling Paper Products Enterprises also simply known as Sterling or "Orions", is a Philippine school and office supplies and food packaging manufacturing company founded by Lim Seh Leng, father of Henry Lim Bon Liong. It is known as a smooth and high quality paper in a reasonable price.

Sterling started out as Sterling Bookbinding in Quiapo, Manila in 1949, with family photo albums as its main product. It grew and, in 1960, additional products were introduced including lettersets, stamp albums, autograph books; it later expanded as Sterling Paper Products Enterprises in 1961, becoming a school and office supplies shop.

When Lim Seh Leng died, his family took over the business. His oldest son, Henry, assumed the reins of the company, which soon flourished. Sterling now has a plant in 02 Barrio Tabing Ilog, Marilao, Bulacan and a warehouse and distribution center in Meycauayan, Bulacan, manufacturing notebooks, bags, puzzles, boardgames, wall charts, papercups, paperbowls and its pioneer products.

Sterling diversified in the 1980s when it engaged in retailing. In 1984 its first retail outlet in Carriedo, Santa Cruz, Manila was established and later opened branches in Quezon City and Makati. Sterling is now known as Expressions, with outlets in various malls nationwide.

From its former land provided by the government of Laguna, it is now headquartered in a 40-hectare land in Santa Cruz, Laguna, which also serves as the research and breeding complex for its subsidiary, SL Agritech Corporation.

== Brands ==
- Sterling
- Orions
- Pentel (for Philippine distribution)
