= Yang Sung-sook =

South Korea Army officer

- Military career
- Allegiance: South Korea
- Branch: Republic of Korea Army
- Rank: Brigadier-General

Brigadier-General Yang Sung-sook was a South Korean army officer.

Yang was born in 1949/50 and attended Chonnam National University from which she graduated with a bachelor's degree in nursing science. She joined the Republic of Korea Army in 1973 as a second lieutenant. By 2001 Yang had reached the rank of colonel. That year she was promoted to brigadier-general upon assuming command of the Military Nursing Academy. Yang was the first woman in South Korea to become a general officer. Yang was quoted at the time as saying: "As the nation's first female general, I will do my best for the military and the country. I hope this promotion will encourage other female officers"

The press coverage around Yang's appointment has been used as an example of gendered news reporting: South Korean press reports complimented Yang on her skill at making kimchi soup and in applying her make-up, rather than any military expertise. Yang retired from the military in 2004.
