= Daejeon Green Growth Forum =

Environmentalist think tank

The Daejeon Green Growth Forum is a think tank established for open exchange concerning environmental policy involving members of academia, research institutes, business, central and local government, NGOs, religious groups and the media from around Korea, but particularly the city of Daejeon where it was founded. It is closely tied to the national Green Growth Forum that was established in Seoul on Sept. 9, 2008, under the aegis of the Korean Ministry of the Environment.

The Daejeon Green Growth Forum works with the mayor of Daejeon Metropolitan City to take a leadership position on environmental issues by tapping into Daejeon's research capability to rejuvenate the city and serve as a model for other developing cities.
