= Henry Lim Bon Liong =

Filipino businessman (died 2024)

- 林育慶
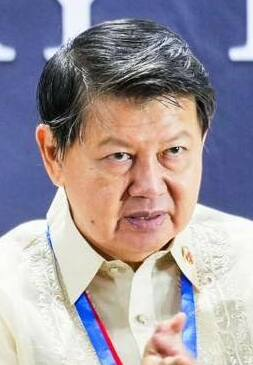
- Liong in 2023
- Born: Henry Lim Bon Liong (林育慶); 1951 or 1952
- Died: August 2, 2024 (aged 72)
- Education: University of the Philippines Diliman

Henry Lim Bon Liong (林育慶; 1951 or 1952 – August 2, 2024) was a Filipino businessman who was the chief executive officer of Sterling Paper Group of Companies, S.P. Properties, Inc., SL Agritech Corporation and was a member of the governing council of the Philippine Council for Agriculture, Forestry, and Natural Resources Research and Development (PCARRD) from 2005 to 2007.

== Early life ==
Born to Maria Co Chiao Ti Lim and Lim Seh Leng, Henry grew up in a Chinese Filipino family in the Philippines. When he was young, they lived in a one-room apartment without a toilet and his parents mostly spoke Hokkien. Through his father's determination, they attained Filipino citizenship. Henry studied at St. Jude Catholic School. His father founded Sterling Bookbinding with Sterling Family Photo Album as its main product. This bookbinding business flourished into Sterling Paper Products Enterprises in 1961, with school and office supplies aside from photo albums as products. In 1976, Lim Seh Leng died and Henry as the eldest, took over the business.

== As a businessman ==
Through Henry's management, the business expanded. More products were introduced and retail outlets were established.

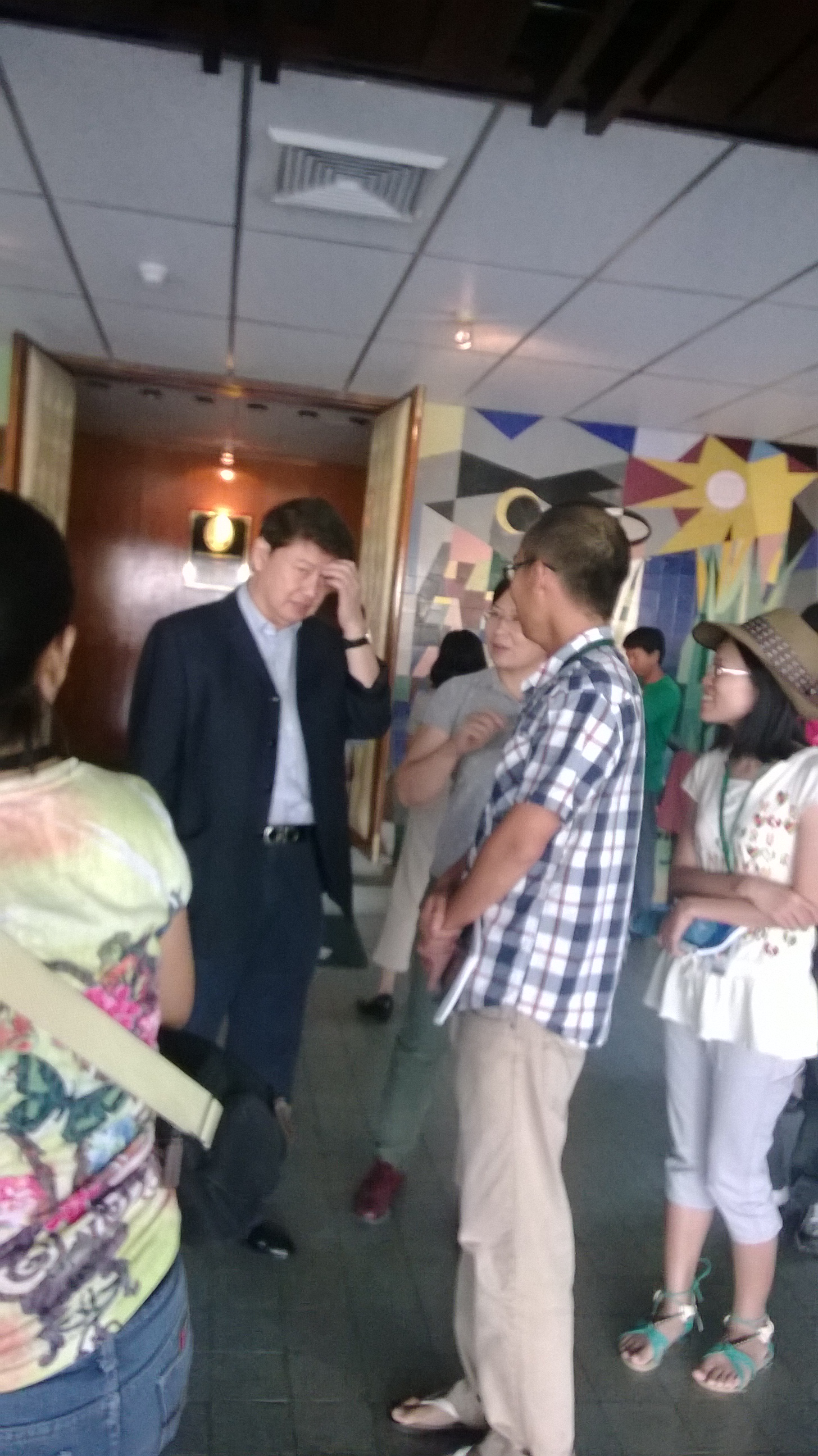
Dr. Henry Lim Bon Liong speaking to Chinese scientists, after a speaking engagement at the Riceworld Museum of the International Rice Research Institute on 24 October 2013 regarding hybrid rice. Free samples of his SL Agritech Corporation's products were handed out in the event.

Lim also ventured into real estate business, creating S.P. Properties, Inc. and the latest of which is the production of hybrid rice, through the establishment of SL Agritech Corporation (SLAC) in September 2006. (SLAC) aims to solve the insufficiency of rice supply in the Philippines. It is now the number one distributor of hybrid seeds throughout the Philippines and has now expanded to exporting rice to a number of countries including but not limited to Malaysia, Singapore, Indonesia, and Madagascar. SL takes on from the initials of his father's name.

He was the Federation of Filipino Chinese Chambers of Commerce and Industry Inc. (FFCCCII) president from 2019 to 2021.

== Personal life and death ==
Lim was married to Rita Ong and had five children. He died on August 2, 2024, at the age of 72.
