= Epifanio Matute =

Filipino playwright

Epifanio G. Matute was a Filipino playwright.

== Biography ==
Epifanio G. Matute was a reporter for Mabuhay under MSCD (Debate, Monday Mall, Herald, Mabuhay). He was an editor for Sampaguita, Mabuhay and Pagsilang. He also contributed to Liwayway and Malaya. His play, Kuwentong Kutsero, is his most famous work, and he became a leading Philippines' playwright under Narciso Pimentel Jr.'s direction.
