= Francisco Tongio Liongson =

Filipino medical doctor and politician

The Honorable Francisco Tongio Liongson
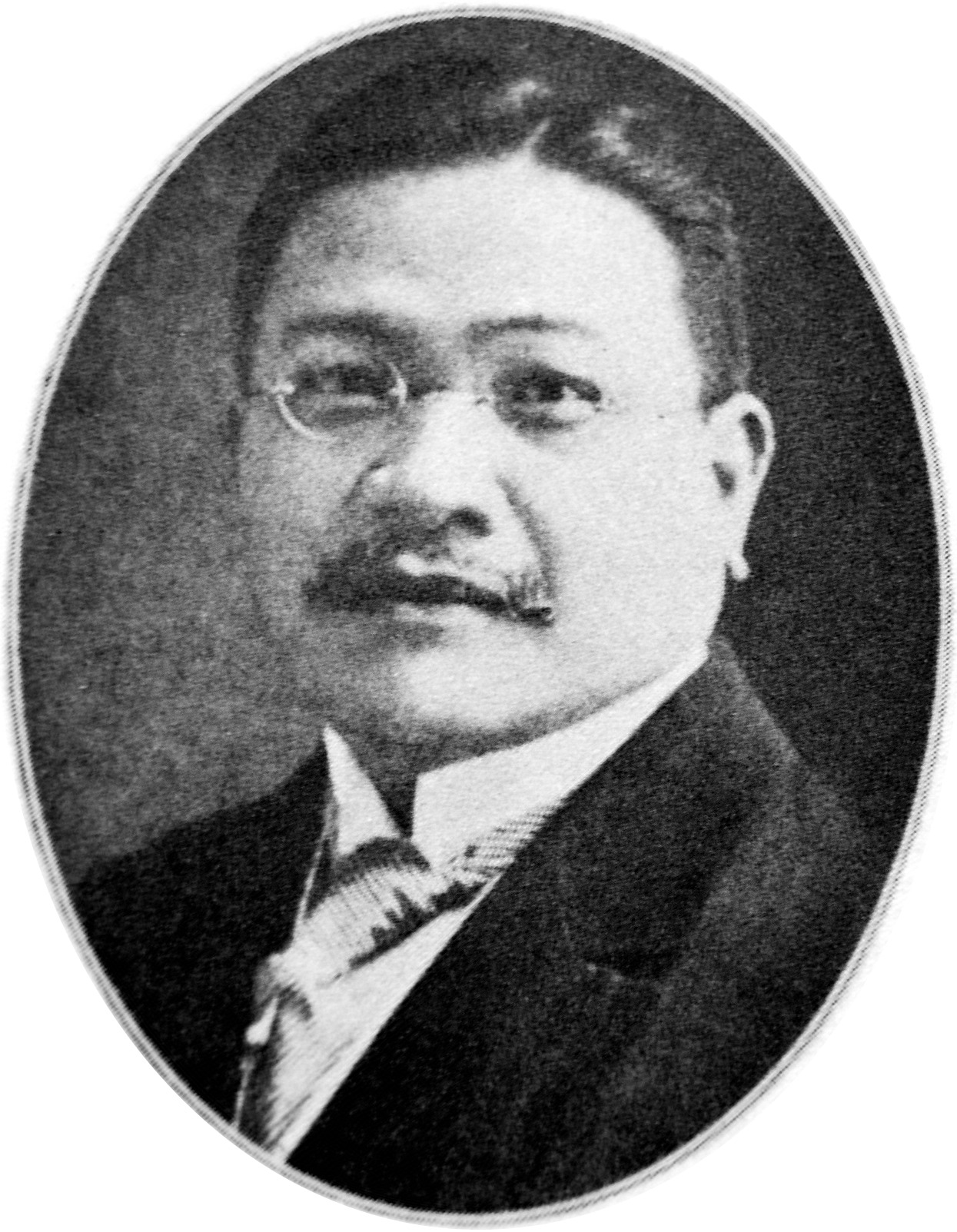

Senator of the Philippines from the 3rd district
- In office October 16, 1916 – February 20, 1919 Serving with Isauro Gabaldon
- Preceded by: Post created
- Succeeded by: Ceferino de Leon

8th Governor of Pampanga
- In office 1912–1916
- Preceded by: Mariano Lim
- Succeeded by: Honorio Tizon Ventura

Personal details
- Born: Francisco Liongson y Tongio; December 3, 1869 Bacolor, Pampanga, Captaincy General of the Philippines
- Died: February 20, 1919 (aged 49) Manila, Philippine Islands
- Party: Nacionalista
- Spouse: María Dolores Alonso
- Children: Francisco Alonso Liongson
- Relatives: Pedro Tongio Liongson (brother)
- Education: Doctor of Medicine and Surgery, Bachelor of Arts
- Known for: The first Pampango Senator

Francisco Tongio Liongson (December 3, 1869 – February 20, 1919) was a Filipino medical doctor and politician.

Motivated by the injustices prevalent in the Philippines, small colonies of native expatriate students in Europe involved themselves in the Propaganda Movement with the purpose of exposing these abuses and in the process began to assume a consciousness articulating reforms of a national interest that was consequently distinct from Spain. Liongson was one of these Filipino students in Madrid.

== Early years ==
Born into a family of sugar planters, Liongson was born in Pampanga's former capital, Villa de Bacolor, to Emigdio Liongson and Eulalia Tongio.

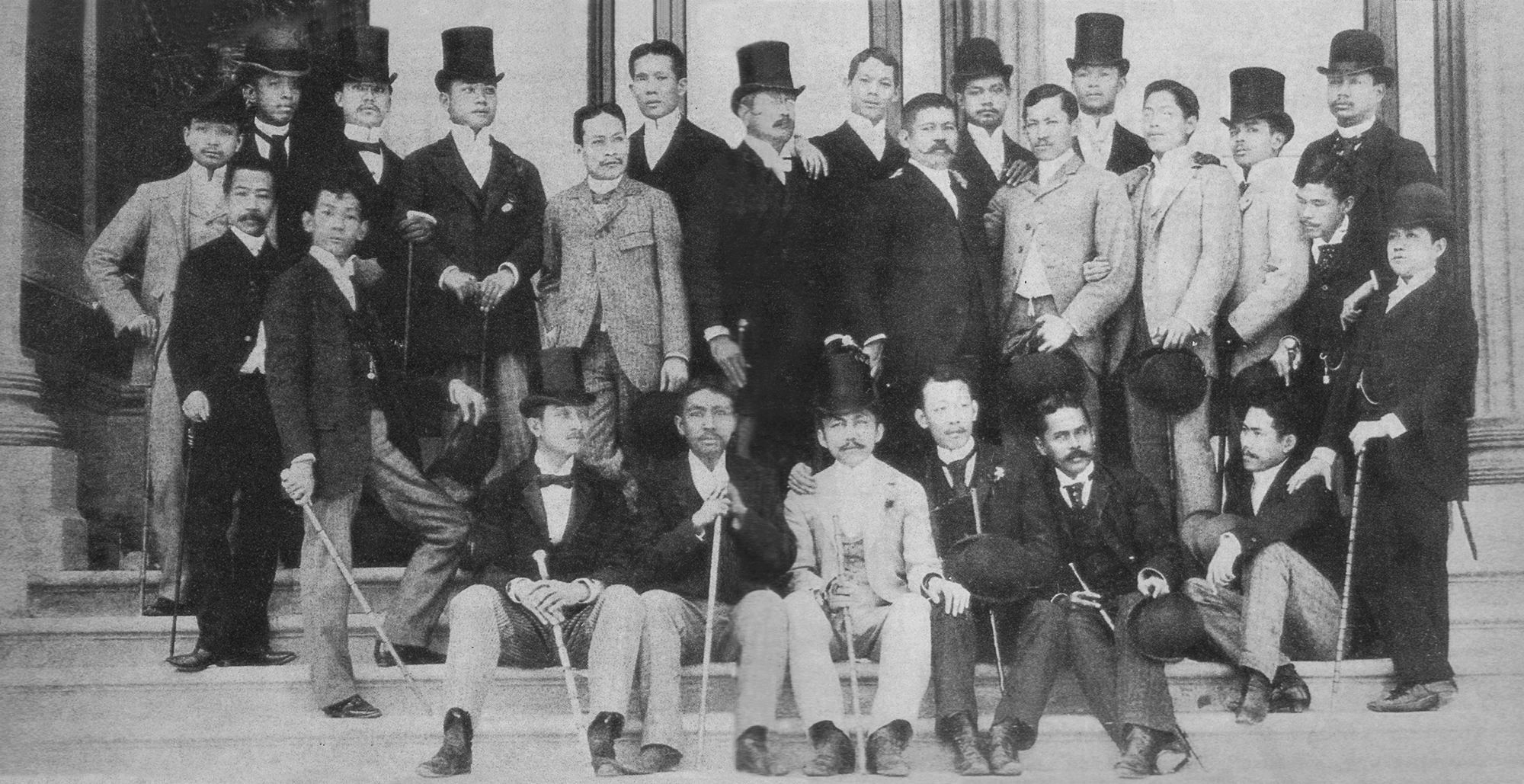
Ilustrados in Madrid (Circa 1890): Francisco Tongio Liongson, standing sixth from left

After completing his primary education in Bacolor, Liongson studied at the Colegio de San Juan de Letran in Manila and earned his diplomas in Bachiller en Artes (1887), Titulo de Profesor en Segundo Enseñasa (1888) and Titulo de Agrimensor y Perito Tasador de Tierras (1889). He arrived in Spain on August 24, 1889, on board the mail steamer Santo Domingo to study medicine at the Universidad Central de Madrid where he obtained his Licenciado en Medicina y Cirujia in June 1894 and his Doctorado en Medicina y Cirujia on October 19, 1895. To broaden his medical knowledge further, he trained in different hospitals in Paris while studying at the Institut Pasteur.

During his sojourn in Spain, Liongson was actively involved with the Filipino colony in Madrid, interacting with fellow paisanos including Jose Rizal. The death of La Solidaridad's Jose Maria Panganiban affected him deeply. In a eulogy to the propagandist, he wrote, "From this tombstone, which safely guards your remains, will spring happy memories for a page in our history." His love interest in the Spanish capital was centered on Maria Dolores Alonso y Castro, a native of Badajos whom he married in the Madrid parish of San Martin on August 28, 1895.

== The Philippine Revolution ==
He returned to the Philippines with his bride in November 1895. Ten months later, the Philippine Revolution broke out. Spanish Governor General Ramon Blanco y Erenas declared 8 Philippine provinces to be under a state of war, and Pampanga was one among them. Liongson joined the Katipunan and offered his medical services to the Philippine Revolutionary Army. He was commissioned Capitan del Cuerpo Sanidad. His Spanish wife died shortly after, leaving a son, Francisco Alonso Liongson. The return of Emilio Aguinaldo from his exile in Hong Kong marked a new phase of the revolution, as did Liongson's marriage to the daughter of Balbino Ventura, Nunilon Ventura y Tison, on May 1, 1898. During the Philippine–American War, he was promoted to Comandante and attached to the brigade of Gen. Tomas Mascardo. He intervened in a dispute between his superior, Mascardo, and his acquaintance from the Filipino colony in Spain, General Antonio Luna, helping to avert an anticipated armed confrontation between them. While in active duty, Liongson also served on the faculty of medicine and surgery of the Universidad Literaria de Filipinas, the precursor of the University of the Philippines, established by President of the First Philippine Republic, Emilio Aguinaldo, on October 19, 1898.

The surrender of Gen. Mascardo on May 15, 1901, officially ended hostilities in the province. Liongson's work, however, was not over. Pampanga was the scene of many armed conflicts, and the province suffered severe physical and economic hardships. The proliferation of diseases in epidemic proportions became a major concern of the United States military health board. His background as a European-trained Filipino physician was cited as an asset to their efforts to combat disease. Liongson was subsequently appointed presidente of Pampanga's Provincial Health Board once the transition to civil control was effected. Under his leadership, much of the resistance to modern sanitary, quarantine and health practices, attributed largely to superstition and lack of information, was reduced. Pampanga went on to control the cholera epidemic of 1902, to eliminate the incidence of smallpox in the province by 1906, and to eliminate cases of Hansen's disease in the province by 1909.

== Aftermath of the Philippine-American War ==
By 1903, Liongson's parents, Capitan Midiong and Apung Laly, had died, leaving behind agricultural landholdings affected by the war. Faced with the tasks of managing the remnants of his inheritance and supporting the inquilino families under his care, he took on the role of farmer and entrepreneur, and came to view the young nation's economy as in need of restructuring. On August 8, 1905, at a public hearing on the reduction of tariffs on sugar and tobacco, Liongson submitted a paper proposing the establishment of an agricultural mortgage bank and tariff reduction. He argued that the insular government should relieve planters from the depressed condition of agriculture at the time. This was the beginning of his role as one of the sugar industry's spokespersons. Subsequently, the U.S. Congress enacted the Agricultural Bank Act (Public Act No. 243) in 1906, providing for the establishment of the Agricultural Bank of the Philippine Government, the precursor of the Philippine National Bank, which was created to replace the former institution in 1916. Tariffs were gradually phased out beginning with the Payne-Aldrich Act of 1909 until their complete removal in 1913 with the Underwood Tariff Act. This was followed by economic growth, including expansion of sugar crop production and milling capacities.

In January 1918, a group of large-scale sugar planters gathered in San Fernando, Pampanga to organize a central sugar mill financed from native capital. The group included Jose de Leon, Augusto Gonzalez, Francisco Liongson, Honorio Ventura, Tomas Lazatin, Tomas Consunji, Francisco Hizon, Jose P. Henson, and Manuel Urquico. At that time, foreign capital financed the construction of new centrals, and the Pampanga planters considered it risky to mortgage their lands to the Philippine National Bank to finance the mill. Despite the risk, the Pampanga Sugar Development Company (PASUDECO) was incorporated in April 1918 and began its first full milling operations in 1922. According to one source, "on the first milling season in 1920 the planters paid up not only their crop loan but their original debt to the Bank."

== Early political career ==
Since 1902, the Partido Federalista, a party supported by the American insular government, had dominated provincial and local elections. However, with the lifting of the ban on pro-independence parties in preparation for the 1907 Philippine Assembly elections, the provincial elections of 1906 resulted in victories for nationalist candidates espousing independence. The pro-independence nationalist front was split into several factions holding various positions on independence – from the most urgent, Urgentistas, to the most immediate, Inmediatista. Even the Federalistas changed their name to Partido Nacional Progresista, the Progresistas, to reflect a more nationalistic position. The pro-independence nationalist front sought to unite ahead of the coming First Philippine Assembly elections in 1907. By 1906, the various groups were reduced to two main proponents: the Partido Union Nacionalista of Rafael Palma and Felipe Agoncillo and the Partido Independista Inmediatista of Manuel Quezon and Sergio Osmeña.

Liongson was a member of the Inmediatista negotiating team, and his acquaintance from the Filipino Colony days in Spain, Galicano Apacible, was a member of the other party's team. After lengthy negotiations, the two parties merged on March 12, 1906, to pursue "immediate, absolute and complete independence." The various pro-independence parties united to form the Partido Nacionalista on April 29, 1907, to contest the seats in the First Philippine Assembly, with Liongson among the founding members. Historian Onofre Corpuz suggested that unification was aided by ties formed among members of the group in Madrid. The newly organized Nacionalistas won 31 seats (plus one seat as Manuel Quezon chose to run as an independent), the Independientes, 20; the Progresistas, 16; Inmediatistas, 7; and other minor political parties, 5, out of 80 seats in the elections held in July 1907.

== As governor ==
The Nacionalistas dominated Philippine politics thereafter. In Pampanga, the Progresistas held the gubernatorial post until 1912, when Gov. Macario Arnedo lost to the Nacionalista candidate, Francisco Liongson. Four years earlier, Liongson had won the election, but the result was later overturned in a legal dispute due to a technicality involving a series of conflicting court decisions. Manuel Quezon described Liongson's 1912 victory as "a vindication and that he was the real governor all along in spite of what the courts have decreed."

Liongson's gubernatorial term from 1912 to 1916 was later described as a period of change and relative stability for Pampanga. It was the period when the first automobile and the first silent movie houses appeared in the province. It was also the period when Francis Burton Harrison became the American Governor General, overseeing the departure of American colonial officials and increased Filipinization of the government. Politically, Pampanga gained more autonomy but became more dependent on the central government for economic and educational infrastructure. Governor Liongson spent a significant amount of time seeking legislative and bureaucratic action favorable to Pampanga's interests. Economically, Pampanga benefited from improved market conditions and the growth of commercial agriculture. The length of roads grew significantly, and the railroad began operating from San Fernando East via Santa Ana and Arayat. Except for a threatened revival of the Santa Iglesia cult, which the governor resolved without incident, the Liongson years were later described as a relatively peaceful and stable period in Pampanga's history.

== Panama–Pacific International Exposition ==
In 1914, the United States invited the Philippines to participate in the Panama–Pacific International Exposition in San Francisco and the Panama–California Exposition in San Diego, to be held in the same year. These events were viewed as part of the broader debate between retentionist and pro-independence factions in Philippine politics.

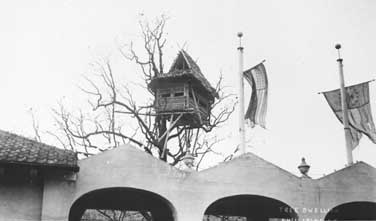
Philippine Tribal Tree House exhibit at the 1904 Louisiana Purchase Exposition.

The debate over Philippine independence had supporters and opponents in the United States. Historically, the Democratic Party supported independence while the Republican Party opposed it and favored retention. Republicans tended to characterize the Philippines as unprepared for self-rule, while Democrats argued otherwise and supported measures for a transition to self-rule and independence. Public perception of the Philippines in the United States was considered significant to this debate. The Louisiana Purchase Exposition of 1904 in St. Louis, Missouri, featured a display of Philippine minority tribes. The Philippine exhibit was well attended, but it has been said to have left a misleading impression that the country's population consisted largely of the tribal groups shown, an impression that persisted for years afterward.

The task of addressing the Philippines' public image was assigned to the country's organizing board for the Panama–Pacific and Panama–California events. This board was composed of Leon Maria Guerrero, president; William W. Barclay, director general; and Francisco Liongson. Both Guerrero and Barclay had been involved in the earlier St. Louis event, while Liongson contributed to the new undertaking. Afterward, Governor-General of the Philippines F. B. Harrison reported, "The result of their efforts was a complete success and has been gratifying to the people of the Philippines and their friends. For the first time the Philippine Islands were presented to the outside world by an exhibition of the education and accomplishments of the 8,000,000 civilized inhabitants of the islands, instead of an exhibit of the 1,000,000 or less partly civilized inhabitants of the mountains and more remote regions, as has been the case in exhibitions, pictures, and lectures upon so many occasions in the recent past." The Philippine exhibit was reported as a financial success and received a Grand Prize at the international expositions.

== Senate (1916–1919) ==
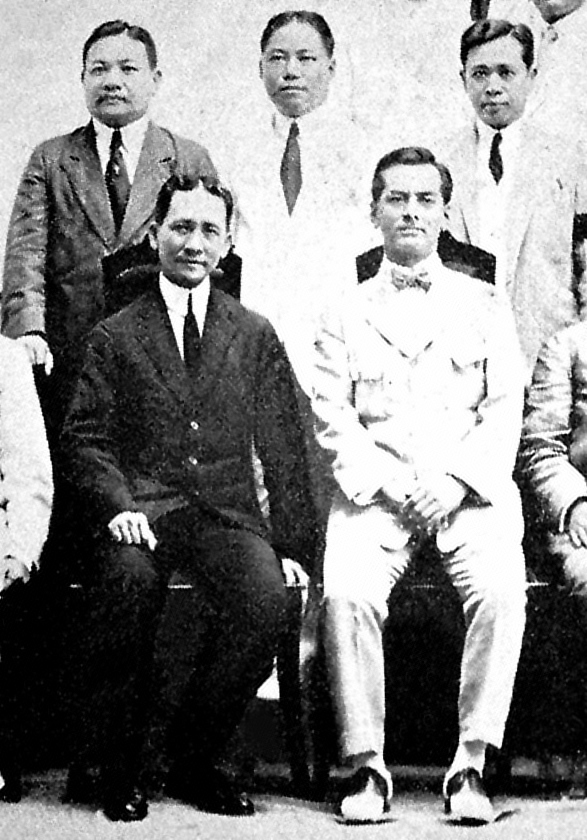
Liongson (far left) with Sergio Osmeña, Manuel Quezon and Claro M. Recto.

Returning to the Philippines, Liongson had about twenty days to campaign for the elections of the newly created Senate of the Philippines, held on October 3, 1916. Voters in Bulacan, Nueva Ecija, Pampanga, and Tarlac elected him to office. He became Pampanga's first senator of the Third Senatorial District for the 4th Philippine Legislature in 1916, with a term of six years, alongside Isauro Gabaldon of Nueva Ecija, who served a term of three years. Their election was contested by opposing candidate Mariano Lim, who alleged fraud and cheating. The Senate dismissed the case for lack of supporting evidence. Lim was later tried, convicted, and sentenced to jail for estafa in 1917.

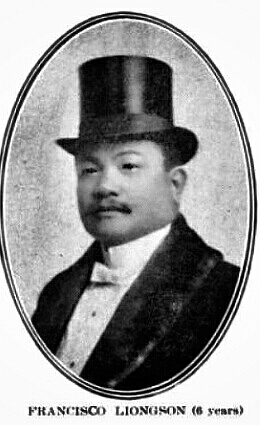
Portrait of Liongson as a senator, Philippine Education, published in 1917

Liongson chaired five committees and devoted much of his time to the Comite de Sanidad. As a medical doctor, he focused on public health issues, which he viewed as important to national development. He was active and well regarded within the committee. The number of bills he presented to the Senate reflected his engagement with this work. As a member of 16 other committees, he was involved in matters concerning agriculture, commerce and industry. He supported farmers' interests and backed funding for the prevention of rinderpest, as well as credit programs intended to support agriculture. He was noted for his opposition to fully removing tariffs on rice imports, citing potential negative effects on domestic producers. Agricultural policy remained a recurring focus of his legislative work.

Though not a lawyer, he took part in debates involving legal matters, such as the Bill on Partnership and the Bill on Conditional Liberty for Prisoners. In these debates, Liongson showed familiarity with both medical and legal matters. He was sometimes able to influence how members of the Senate voted based on the arguments he presented. He did not, however, align with his party on the Divorce Bill. Citing his own views and those of his constituents, Liongson opposed his majority party's bill and drew public attention when he stated that he would prefer death to the passage of a law he believed would undermine the Filipino family.

The Philippine Independence Mission was formed with Liongson among its members on November 8, 1918. Headed by Manuel L. Quezon, the Senate contingent included Senators Jose Altavas, Jose Clarin, Vicente Singson Encarnacion, Espiridion Guanco, Leoncio Imperial, Rafael Palma, Esteban Singson, Pedro Ma. Sison and Filemon Sotto.

Prior to the mission's departure to the United States, however, he became ill with anthrax, prompting his replacement. He died on February 20, 1919, leaving his spouse, a son, and two daughters.

== Tributes ==
I wish to take advantage of this opportunity to express to you one more time the pain that was caused by the loss of your distinguished spouse whom, as you know, I loved so much in life. The services he had rendered to the nation were tremendous and will always be a satisfaction for me to be able to demonstrate with works that we have not forgotten the debt of gratitude that we all owe to the departed.

– Manuel L. Quezon, Senate President

Once more the Grim Reaper has claimed a worthy son of the Philippines in the person of Senator Francisco Liongson. A tactful legislator and businessman, he has done more for his people than many a magnate of his day. The Senator succumbed just as his powerful will was about to land him to another field of service. Had not his participation in the work of the Filipino mission been rudely interrupted by the call of death, we have not the least doubt that he would have accomplished his task worthily and creditably. But time has stifled the beatings of his heart forever, and in the condolence of resignation, we can only remember the passing of a staunch servant of the people.

– Rep. Gregorio Nieva, 2nd Dist. Tayabas

– Sen. Isauro Gabaldon, 3rd District

''Senator Isaura Gabaldon of the third district commended Dr.Francisco Liongson's dedication to national interest and public service, highlighting his contribution to the development of sciences beneficial to the Philippines.''

When I think of the Senator of the Third District during the time he was occupying his seat – now veiled with crepes of mourning – in this august Senate, he seated beside me and was the most committed supporter of certain issues I sucitated in the parliamentary debates. I, like the whole Archipelago, cannot help but lament at his loss. His death assumes the total sorrowful meaning of a national loss. And I say national loss, because his dynamism, his vigor and his patriotism channeled to serve the country in these historical moments will be of great and undisputed value; will be positive contributions in the task of nation building whose completion we anxiously hope for.

– Sen. Pedro Guevara. 4th District

The sadness that afflicts us in this occasion fills our eyes with tears and the tongue fails to express with certainty the bitterness and soulful sentiments for the eternal separation of one so endeared as a father, so beloved as a spouse and so admired as a statesman and citizen. Rest in peace our mourned compatriot; and be assured that, while the Senate of the Philippines exists, in a special place within it, your memory will remain enshrined as an example for the future generations and an inspiration for those who still continue struggling in this world.

– Sen. Francisco Villanueva, 7th District

He has died with the satisfaction of having done his share in bringing about his country's progress.

– Dr. Gervasio Ocampo, President – Philippine Medico-Pharmaceutical Association

His death was the loss, not of a particular province, not of any particular group or association, but of the whole country. The doctors who have participated in politics are beginning to dwindle in number, which made Dr. Liongson's early demise a source of deep regret.

– Dr. Sixto de los Angeles, Philippine Medico-Pharmaceutical Association

Dr. Liongson's services to his country should be given tribute, and that they should inspire the youth of the Islands to follow his example.

– Gov. Honorio Ventura, Pampanga

== See also ==
- List of Philippine legislators who died in office

== Cited sources ==
- Larkin, John A. (1993). The Pampangans, Colonial Society in a Philippine Priovince. Quezon City, Philippines: New Day Publishers. ISBN 978-9711005108.
