= Pedro Tongio Liongson =

Filipino politician and military officer

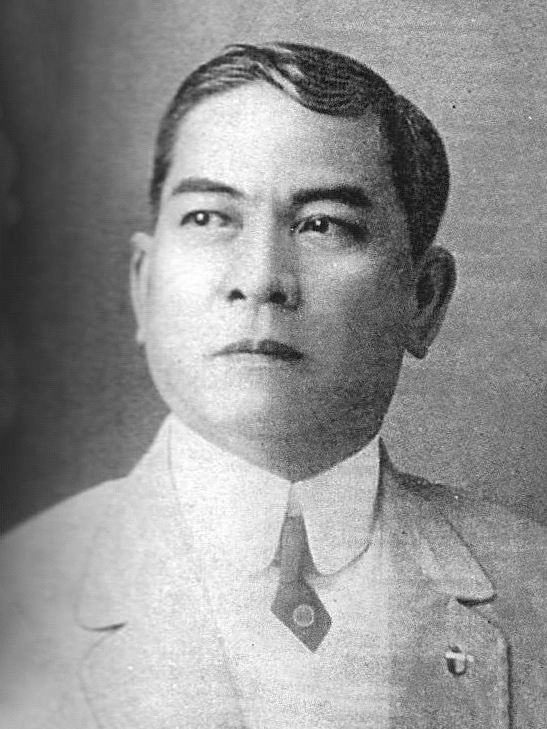

Member of the Malolos Congress from Bohol
- In office September 15, 1898 – November 13, 1899 Serving with Tranquilino Arroyo and Anastasio Pinson

Personal details
- Born: Pedro Liongson y Tongio; January 31, 1865 Bacolor, Pampanga, Captaincy General of the Philippines
- Died: October 7, 1932 (aged 67) Manila, Philippine Islands
- Education: Colegio de San Juan de Letran; University of Santo Tomas
- Known for: Member of the Malolos Congress and First Director of Military Justice, Army of the First Philippine Republic

Pedro Tongio Liongson (January 1, 1865 – October 7, 1932) was a member of the Malolos Congress which wrote the constitution of the First Philippine Republic in 1899 and served as First Director of Military Justice in the Republic's army during the Philippine–American War of 1899–1901. A trained lawyer and judge, Col. Liongson figured in and left his mark on a number of historic events in the Philippines.

== Early years ==
He was born to Emigdio Liongson and Eulalia Tongio on the feast day of Saint Peter Nolasco in Pampanga’s ancient capital Villa de Bacolor. He was the eldest son and second among eight siblings. His family belonged to the town’s principalía.

Pedro completed his primary education in Bacolor. His parents sent him and his younger brother, Francisco Tongio Liongson, to Colegio de San Juan de Letran as interns to complete their studies. Pedro completed his Bachiller en Artes at Letran in 1886 and continued his studies in law and jurisprudence at the University of Santo Tomas where he completed Licentiates in Law and in Jurisprudence in 1892.

Having completed his university education, Pedro was appointed to the position of Bacolor’s Justice of the Peace. The municipal court was among the reforms instituted by the Maura Law to make the justice system more readily available to the grassroots. Pedro also served as interim judge of the provincial Court of First Instance in Pampanga’s capital. By 1899, Pedro Tongio Liongson was one of 259 lawyers in a country of 8 million people.

The discovery of the Katipunan on August 19, 1896, triggered the Philippine Revolution soon after. Pedro Liongson met with Pampango liberals Aurelio Tolentino, Andres Serrano, Modesto Joaquin, and Felix Galura in the abode of Tiburcio Hilario which became a center of revolutionary activity.

== Pampanga joins the revolution ==
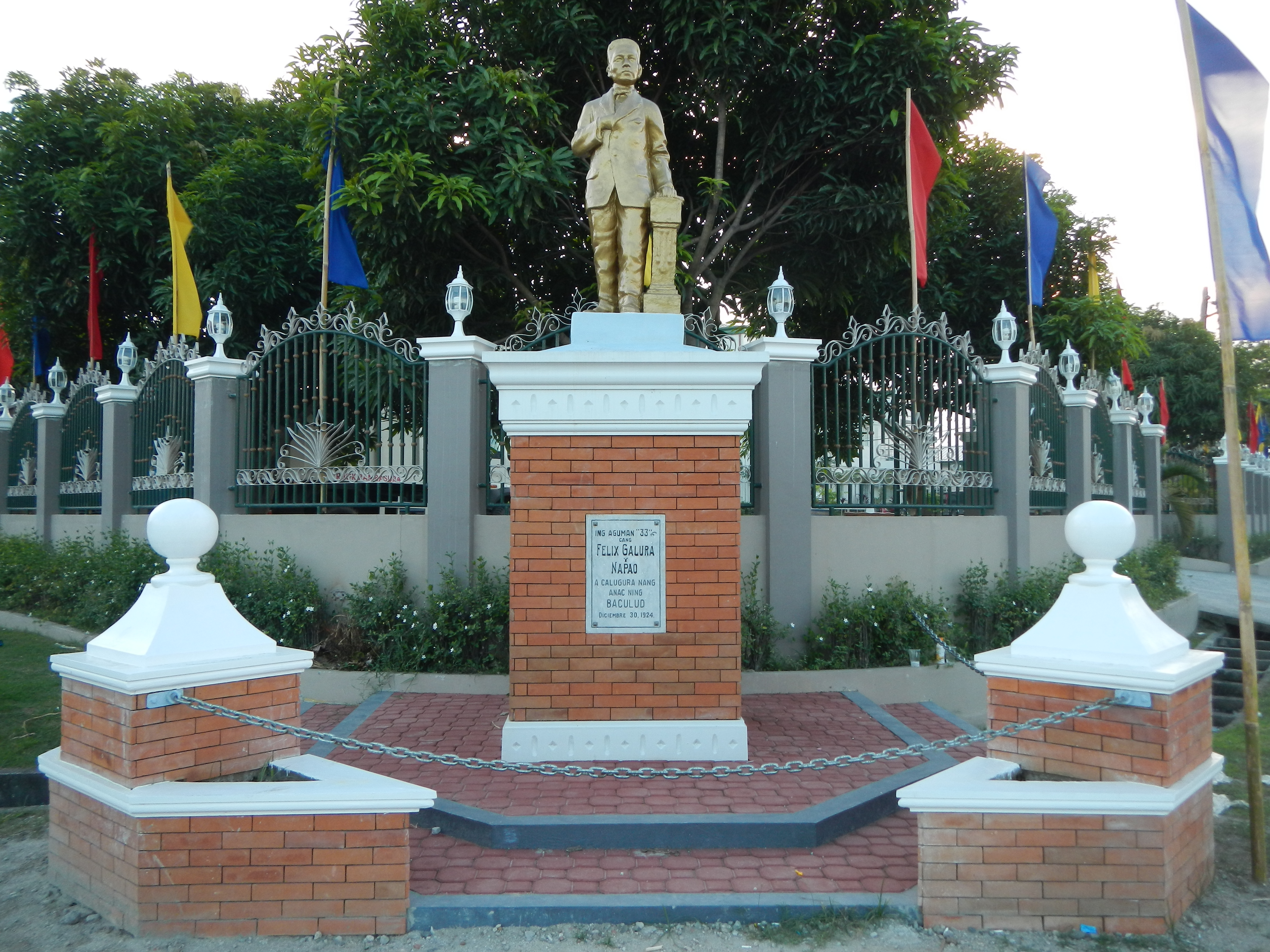
Felix Galura Y Napao (December 30, 1924) Monument, Bacolor, Pampanga; born February 21, 1866; died July 21, 1919; a Pampango writer, revolutionary leader, and known as the "Father of Pampango Grammar".

By August 1897, the Spanish military forces under Governor-General of the Philippines Fernando Primo de Rivera drove General Emilio Aguinaldo’s revolutionaries to the hills of Biak-na-Bato, Bulacan. Pressured by the need to divert military resources to the Cuban War of Independence because of a threatened intervention by the United States, Primo de Rivera resorted to peaceful negotiations and the mobilization of a non-Tagalog people local militia, Voluntarios Locales, in the event the negotiations failed. The enthusiastic response to the formation of the Voluntarios Locales de Bacolor on November 17, 1897, foreshadowed the signing of the Pact of Biak-na-Bato on December 14, 1897.

Commissioned a first lieutenant, Pedro Liongson together with Felix Galura joined the Voluntarios Locales. The Battle of Manila Bay on May 1, 1898, witnessed the destruction of the Spanish fleet by the United States naval forces headed by Admiral George Dewey and signaled the return of General Emilio Aguinaldo from his exile in Hongkong on May 19. Four days later, a battalion of Pampango volunteers sent to confront Aguinaldo abandoned their post and crossed over to join him.

Lieutenant Liongson was arrested by the Spanish authorities. On June 4, 1898, the Voluntarios Locales de Bacolor headed by Felix Galura, Paulino Lirag and Alvero Panopio led the town's uprising. Pedro Liongson was consequently released from captivity. On June 12, 1898, the Philippine Declaration of Independence was proclaimed in Kawit, Cavite with Pampanga duly represented .

The militia was absorbed into the Philippine Army of Liberation. With the Spanish capitulation to the American and Philippine military forces in the Battle of Manila on August 13, 1898, Pedro Liongson now a lieutenant colonel, was assigned to give legal advice to commanders of troops encircling the fortified city of Manila. In September 1898, Lt. Col. Liongson was stationed in Caloocan resolving disputes on the exact line of demarcation between the American and Philippine forces and individual frictions between opposing soldiers in the city. He was later in General Emilio Aguinaldo's entourage departing for Malolos, Bulacan on September 10, 1898.

== Malolos Congress ==
General Emilio Aguinaldo and his retinue arrived at Malolos and inaugurated the official transfer of the revolutionary capital from Bacoor, Cavite to Malolos. Five days later, the Malolos Congress commenced its task to draft the First Republic's constitution at the Barasoain Church. Pedro Paterno, the Congress President, acknowledged 193 representatives throughout the land. Of them, "forty were lawyers, sixteen physicians, five pharmacists, two engineers and one priest. The rest were merchants and farmers. Many of the representatives were graduates of European universities." Lt. Col. Liongson represented the province of Bohol.

While the Congress was in session, Spain and the United States signed the Treaty of Paris (1898) ceding the Philippines to the latter for $20 million on December 10, 1898. The treaty was yet to be ratified by the US Congress and therefore did not impede the assembly from completing its task. The Constitution of the First Philippine Republic, otherwise known as the Malolos Constitution, was completed and approved on January 20, 1899. Among the more contested provisions of the charter was the separation of church and state. The provision's passage by a margin of one vote was largely attributed to the vigilance of the freemasons.

On January 23, 1899, The First Philippine Republic was proclaimed and its president, Emilio Aguinaldo, took the oath of office. On the same day, the president and the Council of Government (Cabinet of the Philippines) headed by Apolinario Mabini as Presidente (Prime Minister of the Philippines) signed a decree covering the release of all Spanish prisoners not pertaining to the regular army, the disposition of Spanish-owned properties, and the expulsion of the Spanish clergy. On January 26, Mabini issued a memorandum appointing the members of the Commission on Prisoners of War to implement the decree. The commission included Florentino Torres as president, Isidro Torres, Joaquin Gonzalez, and Pedro Liongson as members and Pablo Tecson as secretary with voting powers. The commission's directives to be implemented by Lt. Col. Liongson were overtaken by subsequent events. On February 4, 1899, the Philippine–American War began and the US Congress ratified the Treaty of Paris two days later.

== Philippine–American War ==
Pedro Liongson, by then a full colonel, was commissioned Judge Advocate General in the Army of the First Philippine Republic. President Aguinaldo decreed on March 1, 1899, the creation of an Army General Staff. Military Justice was one of the departments in the General Staff with Col. Liongson as head.

Col. Liongson was assigned to General Antonio Luna's command in view of mounting cases of insubordination, desertion and opportunism. After the fall of Malolos on March 31, 1899, Liongson, the Judge Advocate, wrote to the Secretary of War on April 6 from Calumpit sending a list of the men and officers ordered arrested by Luna and punished for misdemeanors he thought were violative of military discipline. Another letter followed on April 14 containing additional list of prisoners. Unable to contain the northward advance of General Arthur MacArthur, Jr., Luna moved his headquarters to Bayambang, Pangasinan in May 1899 where the court martial of Col. Manuel Arguelles for treason was conducted.

The May 26, 1899, issue of La Independencia announced that "a Council of War was convened by General Isidro Torres and presided by General Jose Alejandrino with the assistance of Lieutenant Colonels Ramon Soriano and Sinforoso Bintang, Major Romualdo Leysan, and Captains Santiago Quinson, Lucas Ricafort, and Severo Ibañez. Director of Military Justice Pedro Liongson acted as judge advocate, Col. Jose Leyba as prosecuting fiscal and Col. Francisco Roman as counsel for defense. The death sentence was invoked, but at the petition of the defence was ultimately accorded a sentence of twelve years imprisonment with demotion."

On June 5, 1899, Gen. Antonio Luna and his aide, Col. Francisco Roman were killed by members of the Kawit Battalion whom Luna disarmed and arrested during the Battle of Caloocan. On the same day, Aguinaldo assumed overall command of the Central Luzon forces. Col. Liongson was recalled to the General Headquarters in the town of Tarlac, Tarlac by then the seat of a government on the move.

== Retreat and surrender ==
Conventional warfare proved to be unsustainable for the Philippine army. Endangered by encircling American forces in his last seat of government at Bayambang, Pangasinan, Aguinaldo issued directives disbanding the regular forces and commencing guerrilla warfare on November 12, 1899.

By November 12, 1899, General Arthur MacArthur, Jr.'s forces seized Tarlac when guerrillas began to harass, sabotage and ambush Americans by raids on supply trains, patrols and small detachments. Subjected to these harassments in Tarlac was the 9th Infantry Regiment (United States). Tipped by an informer, a detachment including US Medal of Honor recipient Lt. Edgar F. Koehler attacked the village of Tinuba six miles north of Tarlac on March 4, 1900. 150–160 villagers were rounded up and 29 suspected insurrectos, including Col. Pedro Nolasco Liongson of the Corps of Military Justice, put under guard. Ordered to surrender their firearms by Col. Liongson, the captives led the Americans to different locations outside the village. In one of these search and destroy sorties, Koehler was ambushed and killed. 24 of the 29 insurrectos held captive were killed for attempting to escape, and Col. Liongson and the rest were brought to Tarlac.

Availing of amnesty, Liongson returned to his hometown. In January 1901, Pedro Liongson became municipal councilor of Bacolor in the first nationwide municipal elections and witnessed Pampanga become the first provincial government restored to native governance under the American occupation on February 13, 1901. Liongson spent the remaining years of his life practicing law and reuniting with other members of the Asociacion de los Veteranos de la Revolucion.

== Cited sources ==
- Guevara, Sulpicio, ed. (1972) [1898]. The Laws of the first Philippine Republic (the Laws of Malolos) 1898–1899. Manila: National Historical Commission.
